= Sunday morning talk show =

Type of television program

A Sunday morning talk show is a television program with a news/talk/public affairs–hybrid format that is broadcast on Sunday mornings. This type of program originated in the United States, and has since been used in other countries.

== Sunday morning talk shows by country ==
=== United States ===
==== English ====
Program	Host	Network	Debut	Air Time	Replays
Meet the Press**	Kristen Welker	NBC	1947	9 a.m. ET*	MSNBC, NBC News NOW, SiriusXM POTUS, Westwood One, C-SPAN Radio, Bloomberg Radio
Face the Nation**	Margaret Brennan	CBS	1954	10:30 a.m. ET*	CBS Radio Network, CBS News, C-SPAN Radio, Bloomberg Radio
This Week**	George Stephanopoulos/Martha Raddatz/Jonathan Karl (rotation)	ABC	1981	9 a.m. ET*	ABC News Radio, ABC News Live, C-SPAN Radio, Bloomberg Radio
Fox News Sunday**	Shannon Bream	Fox	1996	9 a.m.*	Fox News Channel, Fox News Radio, C-SPAN Radio, Bloomberg Radio
State of the Union**	Jake Tapper/Dana Bash (alternating weeks)	CNN	2009 (Note: Replaced Late Edition with Wolf Blitzer, which aired from 1993 to 2009 before cancellation.)	9 a.m. ET	C-SPAN Radio, Bloomberg Radio
The Hill	Chris Stirewalt	NewsNation	2024	10 a.m. ET	The CW, Nexstar local stations

(*) - time listed is the time scheduled by the network, local affiliates may delay the show to later slots to accommodate local news or other programming

(**) - considered the traditional "big five" Sunday shows

==== Spanish ====
Program	Host	Network	Debut
Al Punto	Jorge Ramos	Univision	2007
Enfoque con José Díaz-Balart	José Díaz-Balart	Telemundo	2010

Other English language examples include NBC's syndicated The Chris Matthews Show, Bloomberg Television's Political Capital with Al Hunt, the PBS roundtables (often broadcast other days than Sunday) This is America with Dennis Wholey, Washington Week, and Inside Washington, and the originally PBS, later commercially syndicated The McLaughlin Group. FishbowlDC includes all the shows listed in Daniel W. Reilly's definition for Politico's "Sunday Morning Tip Sheet," plus CN8's Roll Call TV with Robert Traynham and other programs, including CNN's Reliable Sources, Fareed Zakaria GPS, Beyond the Politics with William Bennett and POTUS08's Post Politics Program used to be listed in this category but are no longer considered so. C-SPAN's Newsmakers, TV One's Washington Watch, Hearst Television's Matter of Fact with Soledad O'Brien, Gray Television's Full Court Press with Greta Van Susteren, Fox News' Sunday Morning Futures, and (until Tim Russert's 2008 death) MSNBC's Tim Russert Show among several others.

C-SPAN Radio provides a commercial-free rebroadcast of all five shows in rapid succession, beginning at 12 noon Eastern. Other radio stations rebroadcast some of the shows with commercials on Sunday afternoons.

Many local television stations (both commercial and non-commercial) also produce their own programs that air in this time frame, generally focusing on local or state politics rather than national issues, and may play off the title of the network shows, such as Hartford, Connecticut's WFSB-TV, a CBS affiliate which titles their weekly program dealing with state and local issues Face the State, a title also seen on KTVN in Reno/Carson City, Nevada and WHP-TV in Harrisburg, Pennsylvania, all of which serve state capital cities. Station groups may also syndicate programming to air on affiliates within a state, such as Inside California Politics for Nexstar-owned stations in California, Inside Texas Politics for Tegna-owned stations in Texas, and WISN-TV's Upfront in Milwaukee, which is syndicated to a network of Wisconsin's ABC affiliates by WISN owner Hearst Television. The member stations of PBS also often produce their state/local political affairs programming to air on Friday nights as a lead-out of Washington Week.

==== Characteristics of guests ====
The prominent guests appearing on these programs include U.S. Senators, U.S. Representatives, state governors, candidates for President and Vice president, cabinet secretaries, White House officials, and directors of federal agencies. U.S. military leaders, ambassadors, and religious leaders as well as prominent journalists and commentators. Members of prominent think tanks such as Brookings, Center for American Progress, AEI, Cato, Hoover, and Heritage also are often invited to appear on the Sunday morning talk shows.

Various studies have criticized the shows for inviting predominantly white male guests. A study of the three shows on ABC, CBS and NBC from 1997 to 2005 found that the balance between Republicans and Democrats was fairly equal (52% Republicans), 61% of the journalists on the shows were conservative during the Clinton administration and that rose to 69% when George W. Bush's was president. In 2010, a study found that a relatively small number of senior senators, all of whom were white males, accounted for the majority of all Congressional guests on the five most popular shows. In 2021, the Women's Media Center published a study that showed overall 70% of the guests were male.

=== Australia ===
Currently, only two Sunday morning political programs exist in Australia - Insiders on the ABC and Sunday Agenda on Sky News Australia. Former shows include Network Ten's Meet the Press (1992–2013), Nine Network's Sunday (1981–2008), The Bolt Report (2011–2015) and Speers on Sunday on Sky News Australia (2018–2019). The Bolt Report became a nightly primetime show in 2016. The three free-to-air commercial broadcasters air general morning news programs Weekend Sunrise (Seven), Weekend Today (Nine) and Studio 10 (Ten) which include some political coverage.

Program	Network	Airs	Host(s)	Debut	Ending
Insiders	ABC; ABC News 24	9 am – 10 am (AEST/AEDT)	David Speers	15 July 2001	still airing
Sunday Agenda	Sky News Australia	8am AEST/AEDT	Kieran Gilbert and Andrew Clennell	2016 -	still airing
Sunday	Nine Network	7:30 am	Jim Waley (1981–2002); Jana Wendt (2003–2006); Ellen Fanning and Ross Greenwood (2006–2007); Ellen Fanning and Ray Martin (2007–2008); Ellen Fanning (2008)	15 November 1981	3 August 2008
Meet the Press	Network Ten	8 am (1992-2011); 10:30 am (2011-2013)	David Johnston (1992–1996); Paul Bongiorno (1996–2012); Deborah Knight (2000–2009); Hugh Riminton (2010–2012); Kathryn Robinson (2013)	October 1992	November 2013
Sunday Agenda	Sky News Live	8:30 am – 9:30 am (AEST/AEDT)	David Speers (2010); Peter van Onselen (2011-2017); Kristina Keneally (2017)	4 July 2010	24 December 2017
The Bolt Report	Network Ten	10 am	Andrew Bolt	8 May 2011	29 November 2015 (Note: Became a weeknight primetime program in 2016, moving to Sky News Live.)

=== Canada ===
Program	Network	Airs	Hosts	Debut	Ending
Les Coulisses du pouvoir	Ici Radio-Canada Télé; Ici RDI	11 am	Daniel Lessard (-2011); Emmanuelle Latraverse (2012–2017); Daniel Thibeault (2017–present)		
Global Sunday	Global		Charles Adler (2001–02); Danielle Smith (2003–05)	2001	2005
Question Period	CTV	11 am (Eastern Canada); 4 pm (Western Canada)	Bruce Phillips (1968–1985); Pamela Wallin (1985–1992); Craig Oliver (1992–2012); Edward Greenspon (2001–2002); John Ibbitson (2002–2004); Mike Duffy (2004–2005); Jane Taber (2005–2011); Kevin Newman (2011–2013); Robert Fife (2013–2016); Evan Solomon (2016–2022); Vassy Kapelos (2022–present)	1967	
Rosemary Barton Live	CBC Television; CBC News Network	10 am	Rosemary Barton	2020	
Sunday Edition	BBS → CTV		Mike Duffy	1988	1999
The Sunday Scrum	CBC News Network		Nancy Wilson; Ben Chin; Carole MacNeil; Reshmi Nair; Asha Tomlinson; John Northcott	2000s	2020
The Weekly with Wendy Mesley	CBC Television; CBC News Network		Wendy Mesley	2018	2020
The West Block	Global	10 am (Alberta, British Columbia); 11 am (Ontario, Manitoba, Saskatchewan, Quebec); 12 noon (Atlantic Canada)	Tom Clark (2011–2016); Vassy Kapelos (2017–2018); Mercedes Stephenson (2018–2025); Ben Mulroney (2025-2026); Jeff Semple (2026-present)	2011	

Similar programming to Sunday morning talk shows are aired on other days in Canada, including:

- CBC Radio One airs a Saturday morning political talk show, The House, currently hosted by Catherine Cullen.
- CBC News Network airs the weekday daily political talk show Power & Politics, currently hosted by David Cochrane.
- CTV News Channel airs the weekday daily political talk show Power Play, currently hosted by Vassy Kapelos.

=== New Zealand ===
Currently, only two Sunday morning political programs exist in New Zealand - Q+A and Marae on TVNZ 1. Former shows include Three's Newshub Nation and TVNZ's Agenda.

Programme	Hosts	Network	Airs	Debut	Ending
Q+A	Jack Tame	TVNZ 1	9 am – 10 am	2009	still airing
Marae	Miriama Kamo, Scotty Morrison	TVNZ 1	10.30 am – 11 am	1992	still airing
Agenda	Rawdon Christie	TVNZ 1	10 am – 11 am	1999	2009
Newshub Nation	Simon Shepherd, Rebecca Wright	Three	10 am – 11 am	2010	2023

=== United Kingdom ===
Similar practice occurs in the UK, in the form of shows such as The Andrew Marr Show on the BBC and Sunday Live with Adam Boulton on Sky News. However, these shows have a somewhat-broader range, often interviewing figures from the arts, popular entertainment, and sports in addition to political leaders, similar in format to CBS News Sunday Morning in the United States. The first such Sunday show in Britain was Weekend World, which was produced by London Weekend Television for the ITV network from 1972 to 1988.

Programme	Host	Network	Ending	Notes
The Andrew Marr Show	Andrew Marr	BBC One	19 December 2021	
Sunday Politics	Sarah Smith and regional presenters	BBC One	24 July 2018	
Sunday Morning	Rotating guest presenters	BBC One	October 2022	
Politics England	regional presenters	BBC One		The working title of 13 English regions who produce their own programmes on air styled as for example Politics South West
Politics Wales	regional presenters	BBC One Wales		
Politics Northern Ireland	regional presenters	BBC One Northern Ireland & BBC One Ireland		
Styled as Politics Region
BBC News	Various	BBC News (UK feed); BBC News (international feed) & BBC One (In August & Christmas)		
Sunday with Laura Kuenssberg	Laura Kuenssberg	BBC One; BBC News (UK feed); BBC News (international feed) (Occasionally)		
Sunday Morning Live	Sean Fletcher & Holly Hamilton	BBC One		religious and current affairs discussion programme.
The Sunday Show	Fiona Stalker and Martin Geissler	BBC One Scotland; BBC Radio Scotland		
Peston on Sunday	Robert Peston	ITV	27 May 2018	
Sophy Ridge on Sunday	Sophy Ridge	Sky News		
The Camilla Tominey Show	Camilla Tominey	GB News		

=== Japan ===
There are several political Sunday morning talk shows in Japan, most are often broadcast live from studios in Tokyo (Nichiyō Tōron: Kioichō, Shin Hōdō 2001: Daiba, Sunday Frontline: Roppongi), Jiji Hōdan is usually prerecorded on Friday evening.

Nichiyō Tōron by public broadcaster NHK often features one politician from every party represented in the National Diet, in many cases the parties' Diet Affairs Council Chairmen. The latter was generally the case with Kokkai Tōronkai ("Diet forum"), one of several alternating NHK talk shows about political and economic issues sharing the same Sunday morning programming slot before they were replaced by Nichiyō Tōron in 1994. It had initially been a NHK radio talk show and was simultaneously broadcast on television starting in the 1950s.

Program	Network	Airs	Hosts	Debut	Website
Nichiyō Tōron ("Sunday debate")	NHK	9 am – 10 am	Toshio Shimada, Yasuhiro Kashina	1947 (as Kokkai Tōronkai, radio)/1957 (on television)/1994 (unified a range of several similar shows)	
Jiji Hōdan ("Current affairs talk")	TBS	6 am – 6:45 am	Takashi Mikuriya, Kanae Takeuchi	1957–1992/2004	
Sunday Frontline	TV Asahi/ANN	10 am – 11:45 am	Etsuko Komiya	1987 (as Sunday Morning)/1989 (as Sunday Project)/2010	
Shin Hōdō 2001 ("New 'Hōdō 2001'")	Fuji TV	7:30 am – 8:55 am	Tetsuo Suda, Kei Yoshida	1992 (as Hōdō 2001, "Report 2001")/2008	
