= John Ivison =

Canadian journalist

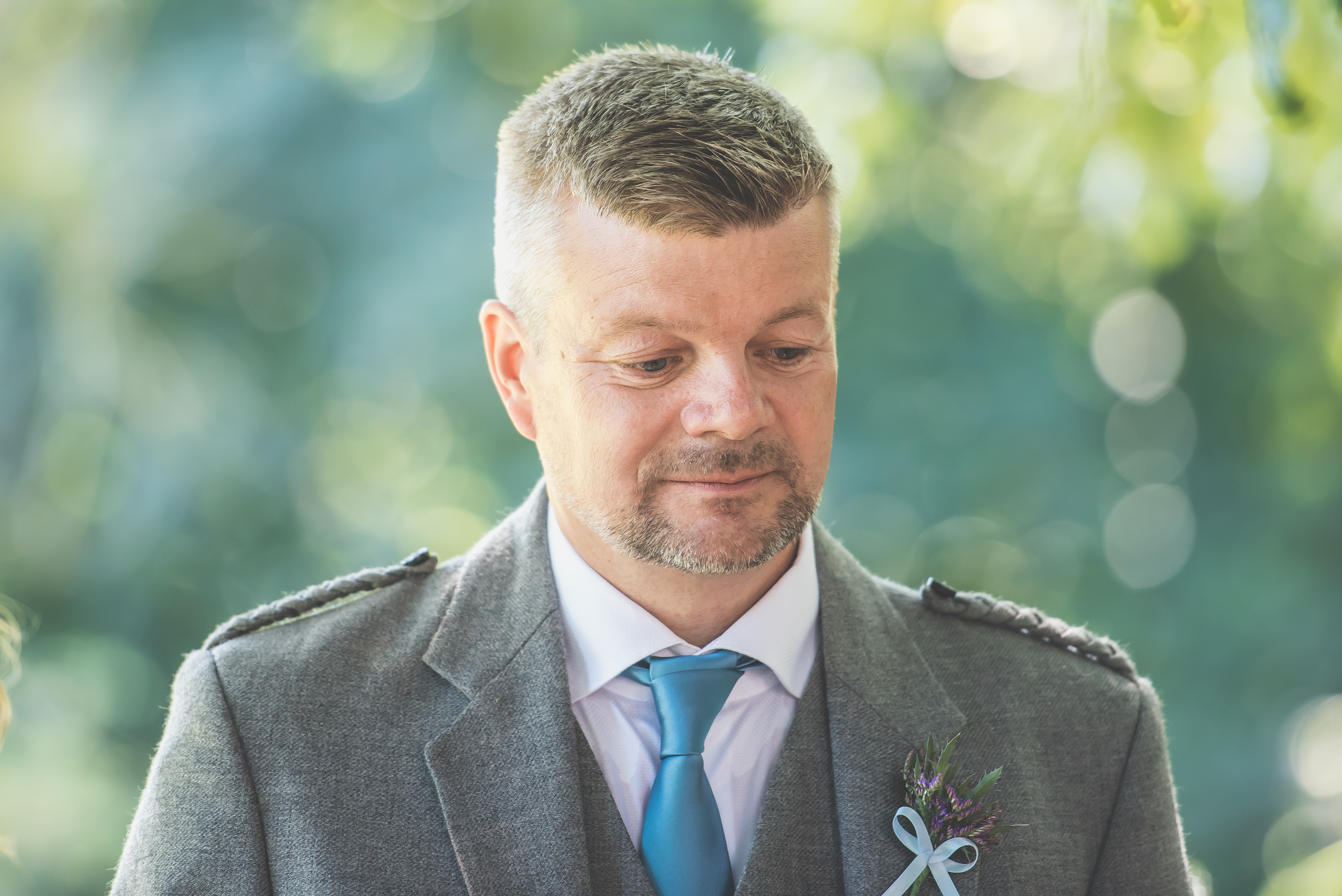
- Born: Bradford-on-Avon, Wiltshire, England
- Education: University of Glasgow; McMaster University; University of Western Ontario
- Occupations: Columnist, commentator, journalist, author
- Employer: Postmedia
- Television: Power & Politics; Question Period

John Ivison is a Scottish Canadian journalist and author. He is an Ottawa-based political columnist for the National Post and Ottawa Bureau Chief.

Raised in Dumfries, Scotland, he worked as a reporter for The Scotsman newspaper in Edinburgh and as deputy business editor of Scotland on Sunday. He was educated at the University of Glasgow, McMaster University and the University of Western Ontario, where he earned a Masters of Arts in journalism.

He moved to Canada in 1998, as part of the team that launched the National Post. After five years at the Financial Post, Ivison moved to the news section of the National Post, where he has covered provincial politics in Ontario and federal politics in Ottawa since 2003.

Ivison has appeared as a panelist on various Canadian public affairs programs, including the CBC News Network's Power & Politics and Cross-Country Check-Up, CTV's Power Play with Don Martin and Question Period with Evan Solomon and CPAC's Prime Time Politics with Peter Van Dusen. Ivison is the author of Trudeau: The Education of a Prime Minister (2019), a biography of Prime Minister Justin Trudeau into the last year of his government's first mandate. He is also the author of a fictional novel, The Riotous Passions of Robbie Burns. Ivison has written for diverse publications including the National Enquirer and in 2020 covered Canada for The Economist. In April 2022, he was officially sanctioned by the Russian Federation for articles opposing the invasion of Ukraine.

Ivison was the co-founder, together with Senator Doug Finley, and first executive director of the Scottish Society of Ottawa (2012 - 2017), a Scottish cultural not-for-profit organization, and hosts of Hogman-eh!, Ottawa's Scottish style New Year's Eve celebration.

== Bibliography ==
- Trudeau: The Education of a Prime Minister. Signal. 2019. ISBN 978-0771048951.
- The Riotous Passions of Robbie Burns. Ottawa Press and Publishing. 2020.
