= Global Sunday =

Canadian television news program

- Global Sunday set
- Starring: Charles Adler; Troy Reeb; Danielle Smith; Stephen LeDrew; Ezra Levant
- Country of origin: Canada
- Original language: English
- No. of episodes: N/A

Production
- Running time: 30 mins.

Original release
- Network: Global
- Release: 2001 – 2005

Global Sunday was a Canadian news magazine television program which aired Sunday evenings on the Global Television Network. The program was launched in September 2001, with Charles Adler as host. Run separately from the rest of Global's news division, the program often reflected the political views of Global's founder, Israel Asper and the Asper family, and was designed to showcase a Western Canadian perspective on Canadian political affairs.

The program ran a mix of features reporting and interviews, effectively acting as a cross between a newsmagazine and an American-style Sunday talk show, and aired reportage and panel discussions featuring journalists from both Global News and the network's co-owned CanWest News Service network of newspapers.

The program's launch also spurred both of Global's major rival networks, CTV and CBC, to relaunch Sunday public affairs shows. CTV, which had not produced such a program since the cancellation of Mike Duffy's Sunday Edition in 1999, relaunched its earlier show Question Period, while CBC launched CBC News: Sunday.

== Hosts and features ==
As a right-wing voice in Canadian television, the show developed a loyal audience, and was broadcast weekly from studios in Calgary, the cultural hotbed of Canadian conservatism. Adler was simultaneously host of a weekday radio talk show on CJOB in Winnipeg, and commuted to Calgary on weekends to host Global Sunday.

On February 24, 2002, the show staged and broadcast the candidate debates in the inaugural leadership convention of the then-new Canadian Alliance political party, with Adler as moderator.

Adler, who described his hosting style on the program as "a mix of Larry King, Ted Koppel and Vince McMahon", also recorded a weekly series of news commentaries for the network's weekday Global National newscasts concurrently with his stint as host of the program. However, not wishing to continue his schedule of weekly flights to Calgary, Adler resigned after a year. The program was then hosted for the next number of months by a rotating roster of guest hosts, both Global News personalities and outside figures.

In early 2003, Global named a permanent host in Danielle Smith, who at the time was an editorial writer for the Calgary Herald. In 2004, the program introduced "The Final Round", a weekly debate segment featuring Stephen LeDrew and Ezra Levant.

== Cancellation ==
With the launch of Global National's weekend edition in February 2005, the program lost its coveted early-evening timeslot. Ratings and resources both dwindled, and the decision was made in August 2005 to cancel Global Sunday. The network replaced it with Global Currents, which aired documentary reports, and merged some other features, including "The Final Round", into the Sunday edition of Global National.

In 2011, Global resumed airing a weekly national public affairs show with The West Block.
