= Kapelos =

Surname list

Kapelos is a surname. Notable people with the surname include:

- John Kapelos (born 1956), Canadian actor
- Vassy Kapelos (born 1981), Canadian political journalist
