= Robert Fife =

Canadian political journalist and author

- Born: 1954 (age 71–72); Chapleau, Ontario, Canada
- Occupations: Journalist, author

Robert Fife (born 1954) is a Canadian political journalist and author who served as Ottawa bureau chief for The Globe and Mail.

Fife was also Ottawa bureau chief for CanWest News Service, the National Post, and the Sun Media chain. He was the Ottawa bureau chief for CTV News from February 2005. At CTV, he was the host of its Question Period show, a political panel discussion; after Fife's move to The Globe and Mail was announced, it was also stated that the show would be rebranded CTV's Question Period with The Globe and Mail's Robert Fife.

Fife published multiple stories incorrectly portraying Maher Arar as definitively associated with Al-Qaeda. He broke the news of the Canadian Senate expenses scandal with his reporting on Mike Duffy and Nigel Wright. Fife disclosed the Canadian government's C$10.5 million settlement with Omar Khadr. He also was part of a team of three (together with Steven Chase and Sean Fine), who first broke the story of the SNC-Lavalin Affair and (with Chase) on the assassination of Hardeep Singh Nijjar.

== Biography ==
Fife is a native of Chapleau, Ontario. He has been covering national politics since 1978, when he began his career in the parliamentary bureau of News Radio. He moved to United Press International of Canada in 1983.

=== Journalism career ===
Fife worked as a senior political correspondent for The Canadian Press from 1984 to 1987. He spent a decade as the Ottawa bureau chief for Sun Media where he also wrote a regular column. In 1998, Fife joined the National Post as its Ottawa bureau Chief. In 2002, he became the bureau chief for both the National Post and CanWest News Services.

In 2002, while at CanWest, Fife published multiple stories incorrectly portraying Maher Arar as definitively associated with Al-Qaeda based on leaked information from unnamed national security sources. In September 2006, the Commission of Inquiry into the Actions of Canadian Officials in Relation to Maher Arar, led by Justice Dennis O'Connor found that Arar was innocent, that the Royal Canadian Mounted Police intelligence had been worthless, and that the RCMP had coordinated a smear campaign by leaking false information to the press to keep Arar imprisoned and avoid a public inquiry into its actions.

On May 14, 2013, he broke the news that Nigel Wright, then chief of staff to Prime Minister Stephen Harper had written a $90,000 cheque to cover the questionable Senate expenses of Mike Duffy. In 2019, He also was part of a team of three (together with Steven Chase and Sean Fine), who first broke the story of the SNC-Lavalin Affair In September 2023, Fife and Chase planned to publish a report that Canadian security agencies believed the killing of Hardeep Singh Nijjar was linked to agents associated with the Indian government. This prompted Prime Minister Justin Trudeau to make the allegations public through the House of Commons.

=== Media and punditry career ===
In 2005, Fife became Ottawa bureau chief for CTV News. Fife served as the executive producer of CTV News Channel's daily political show Power Play with Don Martin.

On November 19, 2015, it was announced that starting January 1, 2016, Fife was moving on from his role as Ottawa bureau chief for CTV News to serve the same role for The Globe and Mail. Fife is currently the host of CTV's political panel show Question Period, which will be renamed CTV's Question Period with The Globe and Mail's Robert Fife in 2016. In June 2016, Evan Soloman was named as the new host of the show.

In 2018, Fife claimed on CPAC panel that systematic racism was a trivial issue in Canada because social integration of "high schools and universities kids of different backgrounds."

In 2025 and 2026, Fife was a recurring panellist on the CBC News program, Power and Politics. Fife appeared in many "Reporter Roundtable" segments of the show along with fellow reporters, Mia Rabson and Joël-Denis Bellavance.

== Awards ==
- National Newspaper Citation of Merit, Political Reporting 2004
- National Newspaper Citation of Merit, Breaking News 2002
- Edward Dunlop Award for Spot News, 1997

== Books ==
- Kim Campbell: The Making of a Politician (1993)
- A Capital Scandal: Politics, Patronage and Payoff — Why Parliament Must Be Reformed (with John Warren, 1991)
