= Troy Reeb =

Canadian media executive and journalist

Troy Douglas Reeb
- Born: 1969 (age 56–57); Toronto, Ontario
- Education: Lethbridge College
- Occupation: Media Executive
- Board member of: Journalists for Human Rights; Radioplayer Canada; CAB Radio CEO Council

Troy Douglas Reeb (born November 6, 1969) is a Canadian media executive and former journalist who served as co-CEO of Corus Entertainment. He previously served as executive vice president of properties at Corus, including the Global Television Network. Reeb was born in Toronto, Ontario and raised in Westlock, Alberta.

== Career ==
As the head of broadcast networks, Reeb was responsible for all Corus TV, radio and digital properties, including Global TV and 37 specialty channels including W Network, HGTV Canada, Showcase, Food Network Canada and History Television. Additionally, he oversaw all radio content and audio products for Corus. He was promoted in February 2019 from his former role as senior vice president of news, radio and station operations. In this role, his roster spanned the network's flagship newscast Global National, local operations from 15 television stations, 39 Corus Radio stations and a dozen Global News bureaus across Canada - with additional satellite bureaus in Washington and London.

Reeb was promoted to the Global Television Network's top news job in June 2008, after returning to the Toronto head office in September 2006. Previously, he served as an on-air correspondent, most notably as the Global News bureau chief in Washington, D.C. and as a political reporter in the network's Ottawa bureau.

Prior to joining the national news, Reeb was a political reporter and commentator for Global Ontario CIII-TV, where among other responsibilities he hosted Focus Ontario. Previous to that, he worked 10 years in radio, with approximately half that time spent in smaller cities such as Saskatoon and Yellowknife, and the other half covering national and international events for Broadcast News, the radio service of The Canadian Press.

In addition to serving as a backup anchor on Global National, other network programs Reeb hosted for Global included Global Sunday, and the short-lived Ottawa Inside-Out. In his executive role, Reeb in 2008 championed the launch of a new current affairs program on Global entitled "16x9 - The Bigger Picture."

Following Shaw's purchase of Global and other broadcast assets of the former Canwest in 2010, Reeb announced Shaw would be undertaking an aggressive expansion of Global News both on television and online, with the addition of local morning newscasts in six markets across Canada. He later announced the addition of a national morning show, a national political talk show, The West Block and Shaw's first regional all-news channel Global News: BC 1. On April 1, 2016, Shaw received approval to sell its media assets to Corus.

During his tenure as head of news and radio for Corus, Reeb has pioneered Global News' award-winning Multi-Market Content (MMC) broadcast model, led a digital strategy that has built Globalnews.ca into the largest, private-sector online news provider in Canada, oversaw the relaunch of eight Corus news-talk radio stations under the Global News Radio moniker, and successfully reformatted FM stations including 92.5 The 'Chuck Edmonton and Peggy @ 99.1 Winnipeg.

The son of a United Church of Canada minister, Reeb spent his early childhood in Ontario, before the family settled in Westlock, Alberta when Reeb was 13. He got his start in broadcast journalism at age 16 at CFOK (AM), a Westlock radio station. He graduated from Lethbridge College in 1988 and helps fund an annual scholarship in his name at the institution where he was named Distinguished Alumni of the Year in 2003. He is a recipient of the Alberta Centennial Medal and the Provincial Awards Celebrating Excellence.

Reeb serves on numerous boards of directors, including with Radioplayer Canada, the CAB Radio CEO Council and Journalists for Human Rights.
