= Ben Mulroney =

Canadian broadcaster (born 1976)

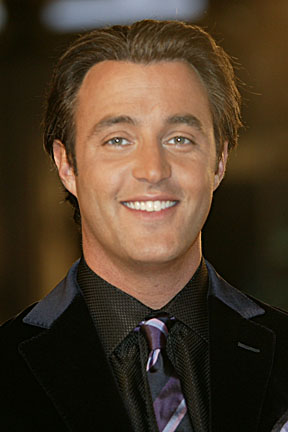
- Mulroney at the 2007 Toronto International Film Festival eTalk Star Schmooze
- Born: Benedict Martin Paul Mulroney; March 9, 1976 (age 50); Montreal, Quebec, Canada
- Education: Duke University; Université Laval
- Occupation: Broadcaster
- Years active: 2002–present
- Notable credits: etalk (2002–2020); Canadian Idol (2003–2008); Your Morning (2016–2021); The West Block (2025–present)
- Spouse: Jessica Brownstein (m. 2008; sep. 2025)
- Children: 3
- Parents: Brian Mulroney; Mila Pivnički
- Relatives: Caroline Mulroney (sister)

Benedict Martin Paul Mulroney (born March 9, 1976) is a Canadian radio and television host. He is the eldest son of Brian Mulroney, the 18th Prime Minister of Canada.

Best known for his 20-year broadcasting career with the Canadian network CTV, Mulroney began as an entertainment reporter on CTV's former morning show Canada AM in 2001, and co-hosted the entertainment news program etalk from 2002 to 2020, Canadian Idol from 2003 to 2008, and CTV's national morning show Your Morning from 2016 to 2021. Mulroney departed etalk in June 2020. A year later, on September 29, 2021, Mulroney departed both Your Morning and CTV.

Mulroney currently hosts The Ben Mulroney Show mornings on 640 Toronto, syndicated nationally on Corus Entertainment's talk radio stations. He returned to television in 2025, hosting the 15th season of The West Block on Global Television Network, during Mercedes Stephenson's parental leave.

== Early life and education ==
Mulroney was born in Montreal, Quebec, and grew up in Ottawa, Ontario. He is the second of four children born to former Canadian Prime Minister Brian Mulroney and Mila Pivnički Mulroney, who is of Serbian descent. Mulroney is one of several children of former Prime Ministers who became Canadian media personalities between 1998 and 2001. He is fluent in both French and English.

His older sister, Caroline, is a former provincial Cabinet minister, and had been an unsuccessful candidate for the 2018 Ontario Progressive Conservative leadership election. Maclean's later revealed that he helped her rehearse scripts during the leadership campaign.

Mulroney attended Lycée Claudel d'Ottawa and the Hotchkiss School, and earned a Bachelor of Arts degree, with a major in history, from Duke University. He subsequently earned a Bachelor of Laws degree from Université Laval. During the Oliphant hearings, it was revealed that all the Mulroney children's university educations were paid from the cash that their father received from Karlheinz Schreiber.

== Career ==
In the late 1990s, Mulroney wrote a regular column for the Toronto Sun. At the time, his father, Brian Mulroney, was on the board of directors of Quebecor which owned the Sun chain.

=== CTV ===
He began his career as an entertainment reporter as the Quebec City correspondent for The Chatroom in 2000 on CTV-owned digital channel Talktv and became one of five co-hosts of the show in July 2001. From 2001 to 2002, he was entertainment reporter on Canada AM. He hosted Canadian Idol from 2003 to 2008.

==== etalk ====
Mulroney hosted the entertainment news program etalk from 2002 to 2020, where he covered major events in entertainment, including the Oscars, the Golden Globes, and the Juno Awards. In April 2009, Mulroney also became host of the CHUM Radio show, etalk 20. The two-hour radio program was broadcast on 11 radio stations across Canada and counted down the top 20 chart-topping hits and includes celebrity interviews.

In February 2010, Mulroney and other staff from etalk covered the Vancouver 2010 Olympic Winter Games for CTV.

On June 22, 2020, Mulroney announced his resignation as host of etalk saying, "More than ever, we need more Black voices, more Indigenous voices, more people of colour in the media as well as every other profession – and that is why I have decided to immediately step away from my role at etalk to create space for a new perspective and a new voice." His resignation came in the wake of a controversy in which his wife was accused of harassing Sasha Exeter, a black influencer.

==== Your Morning ====
In June 2016, he was announced as the co-host, with Anne-Marie Mediwake, of CTV's new morning show Your Morning, which replaced the venerable Canada AM. He left the program, effective October 1, 2021, saying it was to "pursue a career as a producer, developing unique projects for both Canadian and global audiences".

=== American career ===
Mulroney joined ABC News in June 2012 as a contributor to Good Morning America. Former ABC News President Ben Sherwood announced that Mulroney would be temporarily substituting for Dan Harris during the weekends, while serving as contributor to Good Morning America. This followed Mulroney's previous stints as temporary co-host with Kelly Ripa on Live with Kelly.

=== Corus ===
==== Return to broadcasting ====
Mulroney joined 640 Toronto in October 2023 to become host of Toronto This Weekend. He also appeared regularly on the station's morning show, Toronto Today, as well as filling in for regular hosts such as Greg Brady and John Oakley when they were away.

==== The Ben Mulroney Show ====
In November 2024, Mulroney became host of The Ben Mulroney Show, a mid-morning program on the station that is carried nationally on other Corus news/talk stations across Canada. The first hour focuses on issues local to the Greater Toronto Area and Ontario and is carried only on 640 Toronto and 980 CFPL in London, while the final two hours of the three-hour program are nationally syndicated on Corus Radio's talk stations. As well as airing live in Ontario, the show is carried in the afternoon or evening on 770 CHQR Calgary, 880 CHED Edmonton, 680 CJOB Winnipeg, and 730 CKNW Vancouver.

==== The West Block ====
In September 2025, Corus tapped Mulroney to be the temporary host of its weekly political panel show, The West Block on Global Television Network, during Mercedes Stephenson's parental leave. The assignment was criticized due to the Mulroney family's ties to the Conservative Party of Canada. Stuart Benson of The Hill Times questioned "whether Mulroney will be able to sufficiently separate himself from his and his family's close connections to the Conservative Party and leader Pierre Poilievre in order to be seen as a neutral host of a major Sunday politics show." Mulroney responded to Benson, saying that "My bias is there for all to see, judge and take into consideration," but that he "knows how to conduct an interview fairly and with respect". Media personality and former Global journalist Rachel Gilmore also questioned Mulroney's impartiality, highlighting his donations to the Conservative Party, which were close to the contribution limit. Mulroney responded by saying "I have never donated to any political party other than the Conservative Party of Canada. I have been clear about this for years. I am proud to support the party that aligns with my values." Mulroney hosted the show until 2026, when Jeff Semple was announced as the new permanent host of The West Block.

== Personal life ==
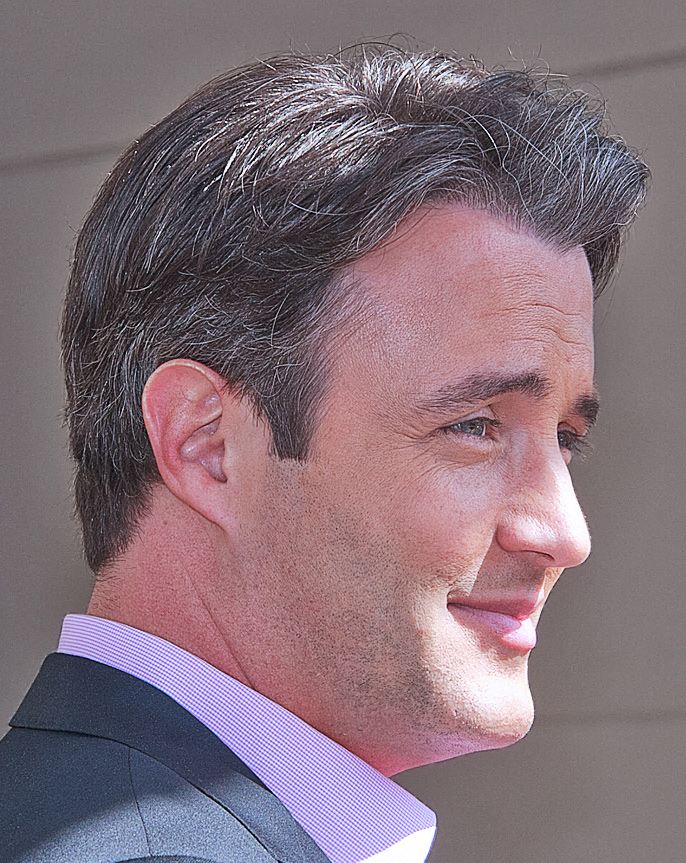
Mulroney at the 2010 Toronto International Film Festival

Mulroney became engaged to his girlfriend of one year, fashion designer and stylist Jessica Brownstein, on December 28, 2007, in Montreal. They were married on October 30, 2008, in a private ceremony at St. Patrick's Basilica, Montreal. Mulroney first met Brownstein when they were both teenagers through his younger brother Mark, who was a student at the all-boys Selwyn House School during the same time she was a student at sister school Miss Edgar's and Miss Cramp's School. They have three children: two sons, who are fraternal twins, and a daughter. In July 2025, it was reported that the couple had separated.

Ben and Jessica Mulroney attended the 2018 wedding of Prince Harry and Meghan Markle, and their three children participated as page boys and bridesmaid.

In 2006, Mulroney was appointed as the National Ambassador for UNICEF Canada.
