= Broadcast journalism =

Field of news and journals which are broadcast

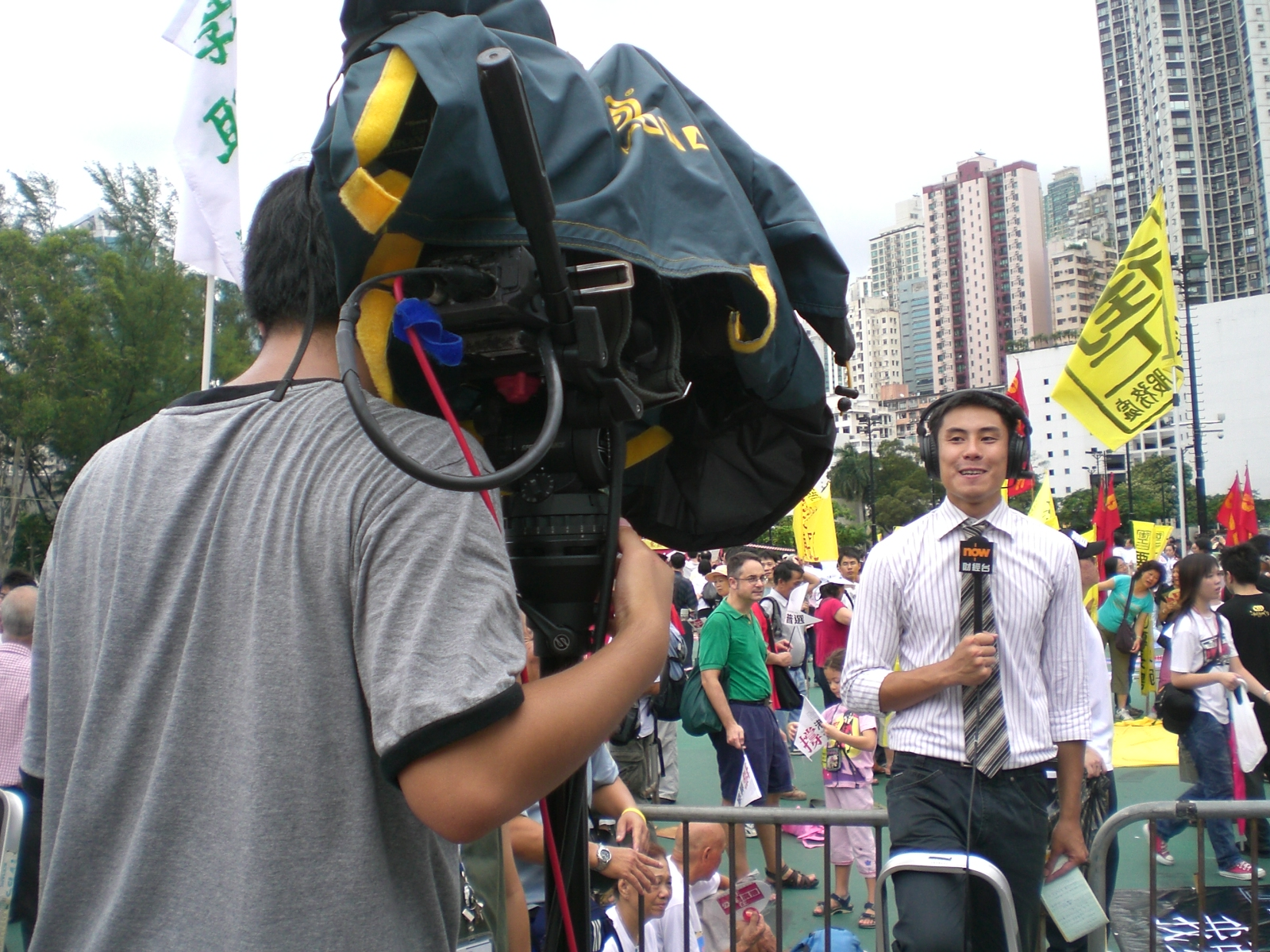
TV news reporter in Hong Kong (2007).

Broadcast journalism is the field of news and journals which are broadcast by electronic methods instead of the older methods, such as printed newspapers and posters. It works on radio (via air, cable, and Internet), television (via air, cable, and Internet) and the World Wide Web. Such media disperse pictures (static and moving), visual text and sounds.

== History ==
=== Pre-1945 ===
Silent news films were shown in cinemas from the late 19th century. Pathé started producing weekly newsreels in Europe in 1909, and in the US in 1911.

News broadcasts in the United States were initially transmitted over the radio. When radio first became popular, it was not used as a source of information; rather, people listened to the radio solely for entertainment purposes. NBC (National Broadcasting Company) began broadcasts in November 1926, with CBS (Columbia Broadcasting System) entering production on September 25, 1927. Both initially discussed similar topics, such as election results, presidential inaugurations, and other matters of concern to the general public. However, NBC soon emerged as the dominant force for entertainment talent. In response, CBS President William S Paley focused on giving CBS Radio an upscale reputation with better news as well as commentary programs with well-regarded hosts such as Lowell Thomas. Both broadcasters faced stiff competition from the newspapers.

The outbreak of World War II led to a great increase in the quantity of news programming, consuming as much as 20% of the schedules of the major networks. Chief among these reporters was Edward R. Murrow, whose reports from London kept the American public focused on a war far from home. He stayed in London throughout the war and was the first to report on events such as bombings in London and updated the people on Hitler's reign. Murrow gained his fame mainly after reporting on Hitler's German army annexing Austria. Many Americans relied on his broadcasts to gain information about the war.

People found out about the attack on Pearl Harbor through President Roosevelt's broadcast interrupting their daily programming. It set Americans on edge, and people began to rely more heavily on the radio for major announcements throughout World War II.

In 1945 The FCC forced NBC to sell NBC Blue because of antitrust concerns, and the new independent network was renamed ABC (American Broadcasting Company); thus the networks that would later become known as the "Big Three" were in place.

=== 1945–2000 ===
Throughout the 1940s and 1950s television news sources grew, but radio still dominated. It wasn't until John F. Kennedy's assassination in 1963 that television newscasting took off. Radio could only capture the sound of the event, but television showed people the true horror of the assassination. This was one of the first major events in which news companies competed with each other to get the news out to the public first. CBS News was the first to report that Kennedy had been shot and was killed. News crews spent the next several days covering everything happening in Washington, including Kennedy's funeral. This set the standard for news stations to have to cover major events quicker and get them out to the public as they were happening. The JFK assassination helped to transform television journalism to how it is today, with instantaneous coverage and live coverages at major events. Television offered faster coverage than radio and allowed viewers to feel more as if they were experiencing the event because they could visualize exactly what was going on.

Women had a hard time immersing themselves into radio news seeing as most of the radio broadcasts were men. There was a small number of women who hosted programs that were for homemakers and were on entertainment broadcast. After World War II, the doors for women in broadcasting opened up. This was also due to the shortage of men that were home during the war, so news outlets looked to women to fill those gaps of times. In the 1960s and 1970s larger numbers of women began to enter into broadcast news field.

A general shift over time happened in the style of the evening newscasts in most countries. In the 1950s, television was novel enough that it was considered entertainment. In the 1960s and 70s, television newscasts tended to be unusually "serious" by later standards, featuring more "hard news" and less light entertainment mixed in. The CBS Evening News with Walter Cronkite is one famous example, although similar styles took place on the BBC in the United Kingdom, on shows in the Eastern Bloc, and so on, with high viewership concentrated in just a few prestige newscasts. This was something of an artifact of both technology and media culture: few channels were available, and those that did tended to take news casting seriously, even if lighter news could potentially have gotten more viewers.

Government regulation also affected the news landscape: in the United States, the Federal Communications Commission forced networks to abide by strict public-interest requirements that required broadcasting news, while television in the Soviet Union was strictly regulated by the government which looked on frivolous topics with disfavor. In the 1980s and 90s, this tended to fall away as a consequence of cable and satellite technology allowing a more fragmented market and government reluctance to interfere as closely. Increased choice in channels led to viewers declining to watch overly serious newscasts; successful network news shows tended to be ones that either focused on entertainment or at least mixed it in, such as morning talk shows or news magazines such as Today and 60 Minutes. Audiences that prefer more serious news have migrated to news-focused stations such as CNN, Fox News, and MSNBC for American examples.

These changes have been criticized as having effects on larger society. An example from television in Italy is a study of Mediaset's rollout in Italy in the 1980s found that Mediaset's programming was slanted against news and educational content than its competitor RAI (Radiotelevisione italiana). A study in 2019 found that individuals in regions with an earlier rollout of Mediaset were more susceptible to populist appeals and less interested in "sophisticated" political arguments. The study said the effect included populist parties in general that offered simple slogans and easy cure-alls, including non-Berlusconi populist parties such as the Five Star Movement.

=== 21st century ===
From 2000 to 2010, overall viewership of television broadcast news continued to decline. Some news-adjacent cable programs gained fame and success in this era (such as the comedy-focused The Daily Show With Jon Stewart and the commentary-focused The O'Reilly Factor). However, their gains did not offset the continuing steep decline in viewership of mainline network news. This era saw diversification and fragmentation proceed even further as new niche networks gained prominence such as the business-focused CNBC, Bloomberg Television, and Fox Business. Instead, people used the Internet for news rather than television broadcasts, both in mainline sites such as ones runs by newspapers as well as independent blogs and message boards with other Internet-users sharing opinions and news Internet news, while a competitor, tended not to use live broadcast as a style, except when streaming existing television programs. Another change in news broadcasts in the 2000s, at least in the United States, was a rediscovered interest in health news and consumer news – areas of special interest to women that had traditionally been written off as too minor for the evening newscasts, but proved to be steady sources of viewer curiosity and ratings.

Both radio and television are major sources for broadcast journalism today, even with rapidly expanding technology. Television still focuses on covering major events, but radio broadcasts focus more on analyzing stories rather than reporting breaking news. Although the history of broadcast journalism has its origins in the early days of radio transmission, it is television with its attractive visuals and rapid dissemination that has empowered broadcast journalism to emerge as the most influential form of journalism until the rise of the Internet and the new forms of journalism associated with digital technologies. The internet often beats out broadcast journalism in terms of reporting breaking news, and the field of broadcast journalism is constantly having to adapt to the changing technology of today.

== Broadcast journalism by nation ==
=== Canada ===
==== Terrestrial television ====
Unlike in the United States, most Canadian television stations have license requirements (enforced by the Canadian Radio-Television and Telecommunications Commission) to offer locally produced newscasts (or any local programming, for that matter) in some form. Educational television stations are exempt from these requirements as are multicultural television stations, however some stations licensed as multicultural outlets do produce local newscasts in varied languages (such as the Omni Television station group). Canadian television stations normally broadcast newscasts between two and four times a day: usually at noon, 5:00, 5:30, and 6:00, and 11:00 p.m. (there are some variations to this: stations affiliated with CTV usually air their late evening newscasts at 11:30 pm, due to the scheduling of the network's national evening news program CTV National News at 11:00 p.m. in all time zones; most CBC Television-owned stations formerly carried a 10-minute newscast at 10:55 pm, following The National, these were expanded to a half-hour and moved to 11:00 p.m. during the fall of 2012).

Some stations carry morning newscasts (usually starting at 5:30 or 6:00 am, and ending at 9:00 am). Unlike in the United States, primetime newscasts in the 10:00 p.m. timeslot are relatively uncommon (three Global owned-and-operated stations in Manitoba and Saskatchewan – CKND-DT, CFSK-DT, and CFRE-DT – and Victoria, British Columbia independent station CHEK-DT are the only television stations in the country carrying a primetime newscast); conversely, pre-5:00 a.m. local newscasts do not exist in Canada.

Like with U.S. television, many stations use varied titles for their newscasts; this is particularly true with owned-and-operated stations of Global and City (Global's stations use titles based on daypart such as News Hour for the noon and early evening newscasts and News Final for 11:00 p.m. newscasts, while all six City-owned broadcast stations produce morning news/talk programs under the umbrella title Breakfast Television and its flagship station CITY-DT/Toronto's evening newscasts are titled CityNews). Overall umbrella titles for news programming use the titling schemes "(Network or system name) News" for network-owned stations or "(Callsign) News" for affiliates not directly owned by a network or television system (although the latter title scheme was used on some network-owned stations prior to the early 2000s).

CBC Television, Global, and CTV each produce national evening newscasts (The National, Global National and CTV National News, respectively), which unlike the American network newscasts do not compete with one another in a common timeslot; while Global National airs at the same early evening time slot as the American evening network newscasts, The National's 10:00 p.m. Eastern Time slot competes against primetime entertainment programming on the private broadcast networks, while CTV National News airs against locally produced 11:00 p.m. newscasts on other stations. The National, which has aired on CBC Television since 1954, is the longest-running national network newscast in Canada. All three networks also produce weekly newsmagazines: CBC's The Fifth Estate (aired since 1975), Global's 16x9 (aired since 2008), and CTV's W5 (aired since 1966 and currently the longest-running network newsmagazine in Canada).

CTV's Your Morning is the sole national morning news program on broadcast television in Canada, and replaced Canada AM, which aired since 1975. Most CTV owned-and-operated stations west of the Ontario-Manitoba border dropped the program during the summer and fall of 2011 in favor of locally produced morning newscasts. The Sunday morning talk show is relatively uncommon on Canadian television; for many years, the closest program having similarities to the format was CTV's news and interview series Question Period; Global would eventually debut the political affairs show The West Block in November 2011.

==== Specialty television ====
Canada is host to several 24-hour news channels on specialty television, including CBC News Network and CTV News Channel in English, and Ici RDI and Le Canal Nouvelles (LCN) in French. BNN Bloomberg operates as a financial news channel, while Sun News Network briefly operated from 2011 to 2015 as a conservative-leaning competitor to the other national news channels. There are also a handful of regional news channels, such as CP24 (which covers the Greater Toronto Area), and Global News: BC 1, which covers Vancouver. CityNews Channel formerly operated as a competitor to CP24, although that channel shut down after a year and a half of operation in May 2013

The U.S. CNN, Fox News, HLN, and MSNBC, as well as a number of other international news channels (such as, most commonly, Al Jazeera English and BBC World News) are authorized for distribution by Canadian television providers by the CRTC.

=== United States ===
==== Broadcast television ====
For most of the American public, local news and national TV newscasts are the primary news sources. Not only the numbers of audience viewers, but the effect on each viewer is considered more persuasive ("The medium is the message"). Television is dominated by attractive visuals (including beauty, action, and shock), with short soundbites and fast "cuts" (changes of camera angle). Television viewing numbers have become fragmented, with the introduction of cable news channels, such as Cable News Network (CNN), Fox News Channel and MSNBC.

===== Local newscasts =====
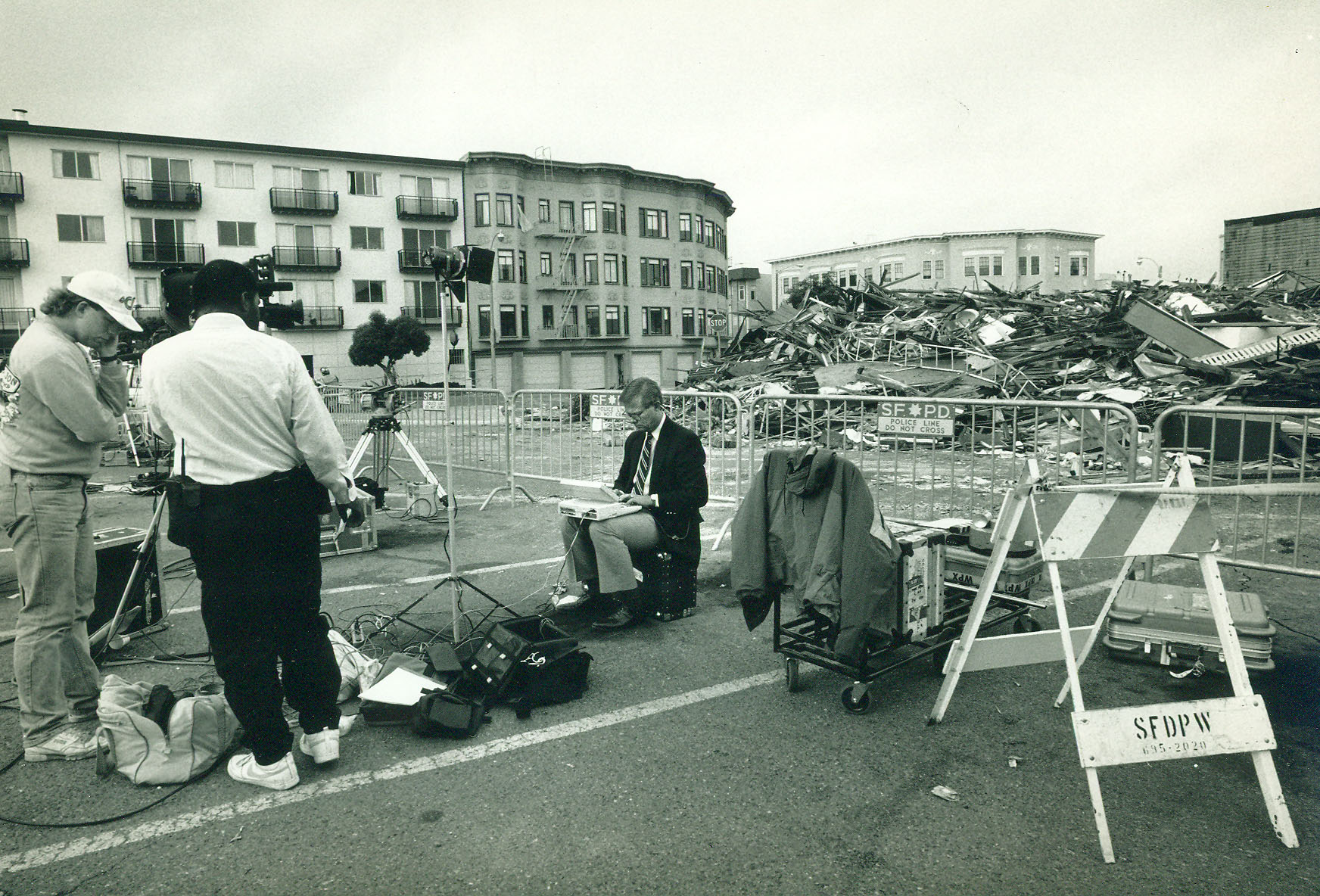
A journalist works on location at the Loma Prieta Earthquake in San Francisco's Marina District October 1989.

Local TV stations in the United States normally broadcast local news three to four times a day on average: commonly airing at 4:30, 5:00, 5:30, or 6:00 a.m.; noon; 5:00 and 6:00 p.m. in the early evening; and 10:00 or 11:00 p.m. Some stations carry morning newscasts at 4:00, 7:00, 8:00, or 9:00 a.m., midday newscasts at 11:00 or 11:30 a.m., late afternoon newscasts at 4:00 or 4:30 p.m., or early evening newscasts at 5:00 or 6:00 p.m. Many Fox affiliates, affiliates of minor networks (such as The CW and MyNetworkTV), and independent stations air newscasts in the final hour of primetime (i.e., 10:00 p.m. in the Eastern and Pacific time zones or 9:00 p.m. in the Mountain and Central time zones in the U.S.). Stations that produce local newscasts typically broadcast as little as one to as much over twelve hours of local news on weekdays and as little as one hour to as much as seven hours on weekends; news programming on weekends are typically limited to morning and evening newscasts as the variable scheduling of network sports programming (if a station is affiliated with a network with a sports division) usually prevents most stations from carrying midday newscasts (however a few stations located in the Eastern and Pacific time zones do produce weekend midday newscasts).

From the 1940s to the 1960s, broadcast television stations typically provided local news programs only one to two times each evening for 15 minutes (the normal length for many locally produced programs at the time); usually these programs aired as supplements to network-supplied evening news programs or leadouts for primetime programming. Reports featured on local and national television newscasts during this time were generally provided via film or still photography; eventually, videotape began to be used to provide live coverage of news events. The 1950s also saw the first use of airborne newsgathering; most notably, in 1958, Los Angeles television station KTLA began operating the "Telecopter", a helicopter equipped for newsgathering use that was the most advanced airborne television broadcast device of its time.

The modern-day coverage of major breaking news events came to fruition following the assassination of John F. Kennedy on November 22, 1963; the news of Kennedy's death was first announced by Eddie Barker, the news director at KRLD-TV (now KDFW) in Dallas, who passed along word from an official at Parkland Hospital; Barker's scoop appeared live simultaneously on CBS and ABC as a result of a local press pool arrangement. Many local and national news organizations such as Dallas station WFAA-TV and CBS News provided continuous coverage of the events and aftermath for five days. The November 24, 1963, assassination of Kennedy's accused killer Lee Harvey Oswald by Jack Ruby was fed to NBC by a remote unit on loan to its Dallas affiliate WBAP-TV (now KXAS-TV) from competitor KTVT, and was the first murder to have been witnessed live on U.S. network television. The coverage provided by the local stations eventually led to further investments and technological developments to provide real-time news; newsgathering vehicles equipped with satellites began to be used on the local and national levels beginning in the 1970s. During the 1960s and 1970s, many stations began to provide additional news programming, beginning with midday news programs; in the late 1970s, the first local morning news programs debuted.

Additional changes in local news content came during the 1980s and 1990s; in January 1989, WSVN in Miami became the first to adopt a news-intensive programming format; rather than fill its schedule with syndicated content as other Fox stations did at the time it joined that network, Ed Ansin (owner of WSVN parent Sunbeam Television) chose instead to heavily invest in the station's news department, and replace national newscasts and late-prime time network programs vacated as a result of losing its NBC affiliation (the byproduct of an affiliation switch caused by CBS and WSVN's former network partner NBC buying other stations in the market) with additional newscasts. This model was eventually replicated by many other stations affiliated with the post-1986 television networks as well as some news-producing independent stations (beginning with Fox's 1994 deals with New World Communications and SF Broadcasting that saw several major network stations change their affiliations), and also resulted in even NBC, CBS, and ABC affiliates adopting similar scheduling formats (tweaked to account for the larger amount of network programming that those networks carry). In 1990, WEWS-TV in Cleveland conceived a concept known as the "24-Hour News Source" (which has its origins in a news format used by short-lived Boston independent station WXPO-TV when it signed on in 1969), in which supplementary 30-second long news updates were produced at or near the top of each hour outside regular long-form newscasts during local commercial break inserts shown within network and syndicated programming. The format spread to other U.S. television stations (most notably, WISH-TV in Indianapolis, one of the few remaining users of the concept), most of which eventually disposed of the hourly update format by the early 2000s.

Since the early 1990s, independent stations and stations affiliated with a non-Big Three network have entered into "news share agreements", in which news production is outsourced to a major network station (usually an affiliate of ABC, NBC, or CBS), often to avoid shouldering the cost of starting a news department from scratch or because of a lack of studio space. These commonly involve Fox, CW, and MyNetworkTV affiliates (and previously affiliate stations of the now-defunct predecessors of the latter two networks, The WB and UPN) and in some cases, independent stations; however such agreements exist in certain markets between two co-owned/co-managed Big Three affiliates. News share agreements are most common with stations co-owned with a larger network affiliate or whose operations are jointly managed through a shared service or local marketing agreement. In cases where a station with an existing news department enters into a news share agreement, it will result either the two departments merging or the outright conversion of newscast production from in-house to outsourced production. Minor network affiliates involved in news share agreements will often carry far fewer hours of local newscasts than would be conceivable with an in-house news department to avoid competition with the outsourcing partner's own newscasts, as a result, minor network affiliates involved in these NSAs often will carry a morning newscast from 7:00 to 9:00 a.m. (in competition with the national network newscasts instead of airing competing with the Big Three affiliates' newscasts) or a primetime newscast at 10:00 pm. Eastern and Pacific or 9:00 pm. Central and Mountain Time, with limited to no newscasts in other traditional news time periods (midday, late afternoon, or early evening).

Because of the increased presence of duopolies and outsourcing agreements since the early 2000s, the number of minor network affiliates and independent stations that produce their own newscasts has markedly decreased compared to when duopolies were barred under Federal Communications Commission rules prior to 2000 (as of 2013, there are at least 15 minor network affiliates or independent stations that produce their own local newscasts, most are located within the 20 largest U.S. media markets). Duopolies and outsourcing agreements have also affected Fox stations in a similar manner; although Fox is considered to be a major network on the same level as NBC, ABC, and CBS and has urged its affiliates since the early 1990s to broadcast local news, about half of its stations broadcast local news programming through news share agreements with many of the remainder operating their own news departments. Several stations affiliated with Spanish-language networks (such as Univision, Telemundo, and UniMás) or also broadcast their own newscasts, these stations often produce a substantially lower weekly newscast output compared to its English-language counterparts (usually limited to half-hour broadcasts in the evening, and often airing only on weeknights).

Unlike international broadcast stations which tend to brand under uniform newscast titles based solely on network affiliation, U.S. television stations tend to use varying umbrella titles for their newscasts; some title their newscasts using the station's on-air branding (such as combining the network affiliation and channel number with the word "News"), others use franchised brand names (like Eyewitness News, Action News and NewsChannel) for their news programming. Conversely, the naming conventions for a station's newscast are sometimes used as a universal on-air branding for the station itself, and may be used for general promotional purposes, even used in promoting syndicated and network programming (such as KFOR-TV in Oklahoma City, Oklahoma, which uses the uniform news and general branding NewsChannel 4). Many stations title their newscasts with catchy names like Daybreak, Good Morning (city or region name), First at Four, Live at Five, Eleven @ 11:00, or Nightcast. These names are intended to set one station apart from the rest, especially for viewers who are chosen for audience measurement surveys. If the respondent was unable to provide a channel number or call letters, the newscast title is often enough for the appropriate station to receive Nielsen ratings credit.

===== Network world news programs =====
The Big Three broadcast television networks produce morning and evening national newscasts. These newscasts are focused on world news, national news, and sometimes local news items that have some national significance. (Good Morning America First Look, Good Morning America, and ABC World News are broadcast by ABC, CBS broadcasts the CBS News Mornings, CBS Mornings, and the CBS Evening News, and NBC produces Early Today, Today, and NBC Nightly News) as well as weekly newsmagazine series (NBC's Dateline; ABC's 20/20 and Nightline; and CBS's CBS News Sunday Morning, 48 Hours, and 60 Minutes).

Network morning newscasts usually air at 7:00 a.m. (English-language network morning shows air live in the Eastern Time Zone and tape delayed for the remaining time zones, while the Spanish-language morning shows air live in the Eastern, Central, and Mountain time zones and are tape delayed in the Pacific Time Zone); network evening newscasts usually are broadcast live twice, at 6:30 p.m. Eastern time/5:30 p.m. Central time for the East Coast before another "Western Edition" live broadcast at 6:30 p.m. Pacific time/7:30 p.m. Mountain time. Today was the first morning news program to be broadcast on American television and in the world, when it debuted on January 14, 1952; the earliest national evening news program was The Walter Compton News, a short-lived 15-minute newscast that aired on the DuMont Television Network from 1947 to 1948.

All four major English networks and the two largest Spanish networks also carry political talk programs on Sunday mornings (NBC's Meet the Press, ABC's This Week, CBS' Face the Nation, Fox's sole news program Fox News Sunday, Univision's Al Punto, and Telemundo's Enfoque); of these programs, Meet the Press holds the distinction of being the longest-running American television program as it has aired since November 6, 1947. The U.S. is one of the few countries in which broadcast networks provide overnight or early morning national news programs, in addition to those airing in the morning and early evening. CBS and ABC are currently the only networks that produce overnight news programs on weeknights in the form of Up to the Minute and World News Now, respectively; NBC previously produced overnight newscasts at different times, both of which have since been cancelled: NBC News Overnight from 1982 to 1983, and NBC Nightside from 1991 to 1998 (NBC currently does not offer a late night newscast, although the network currently airs rebroadcasts of the fourth hour of Today, and sister network CNBC's Mad Money on weeknights).

Spanish-language news programs are provided by Univision, which produces early and late evening editions of its flagship evening news program Noticiero Univision seven nights a week (and was the only nightly newscast on the major Spanish networks until Telemundo resumed its weekend newscasts in October 2014), along with weekday afternoon newsmagazine Primer Impacto and weekday morning program Despierta America; Telemundo, which has a daily flagship evening newscast Noticias Telemundo, along with weekday morning program Hoy Día (which replaced Un Nuevo Día in 2021) and weekday afternoon newsmagazine Al Rojo Vivo; Estrella TV, which produces the weekday-only flagship news program Noticiero Estrella TV and the primetime newscast Cierre de Edición; and Azteca América, which produces morning, early and late evening newscasts on weekdays under the umbrella title Hechos. In the cases of Univision and Telemundo, both of their evening news programs compete with national evening news programs on their English-language competitors.

Fox, The CW, and MyNetworkTV do not produce national morning and evening news programs (although Fox made a brief attempt at a morning program from 1996 to 1997 with Fox After Breakfast; many CW and MyNetworkTV affiliates and independent stations air the syndicated news program The Daily Buzz, while some Tribune Broadcasting-owned CW and MyNetworkTV stations air a similar program called EyeOpener).

==== Cable television ====
24-hour news channels are devoted to current events around the clock. They are often referred to as cable news channels. The format was originated by the cable television channel CNN (Cable News Network), which was established in 1980. Many other television channels have since been established, including what has become known as the Big Three; CNN, Fox News, and MSNBC.

Conversely, several cable news channels exist that carry news reports specifically geared toward a particular metropolitan area, region, or state such as New York City's NY1 (which focuses on the entire New York metropolitan area) and News 12 Networks (which serves portions of the area outside Manhattan), Orlando's News 13 (which is also carried in areas surrounding Greater Orlando), Tampa, Florida's Bay News 9, and Washington, D.C.'s NewsChannel 8. These channels are usually owned by a local cable operator and are distributed solely through cable television and IPTV system operators. Some broadcast television stations also operate cable channels (some of which are repeated through digital multicasting) that air the station's local newscasts in the form of live simulcasts from the television station, with rebroadcasts of the newscasts airing in time periods between the live broadcasts.

A term which has entered common parlance to differentiate cable news from traditional news broadcasts is network news, in reference to the traditional television networks on which such broadcasts air. A classic example is the cable news channel MSNBC, which overlaps with (and, in the case of very significant breaking news events, pre-empts) its network counterpart NBC News; in some cases, viewers may have trouble differentiating between the cable channel and either a counterpart network news organization or a local news operation, such as is the case with Fox News Channel and the Fox network's owned-and-operated stations and affiliates (most of which use the Fox (channel #) News brand for their newscasts), due to the network's controversially perceived conservative-leaning political content that differs from the Fox broadcast stations' independent and generally nonpartisan reporting. Most U.S. cable news networks do not air news programming 24 hours a day, often filling late afternoon, primetime, and late night hours with news-based talk programs, documentaries, and other specialty programming.

==== Radio ====
More often, AM radio stations will air a 6½-minute newscast at the top of the hour, which can be either a local report, a national report from a radio network such as CBS Radio, CNN Radio, NPR, Fox News Radio, or ABC News Radio, or a mix of both local and national content, including weather and traffic reports. Some stations also air a two-minute report at the bottom of the hour.

FM stations, unless they feature a talk radio format, usually only air an abbreviated weather forecast. Some also air minute-long news capsules featuring a quick review of events, and usually only in drive time periods or in critical emergencies, since FM stations usually focus more on playing music. Traffic reports also air on FM stations, depending on the market.

=== Israel ===
==== Radio ====
In some countries, radio news content may be syndicated by a website or company to many stations in a particular region or even the entire country. A notable example is Israel, where there are groups of radio stations that broadcast the same hourly news capsule by an Israeli news website and television station. There are currently two groups of local Israeli stations: one broadcasts news from YNET, the other broadcasts them from Channel 10. Israeli Army Radio general public stations broadcast the same news capsule every hour, and IBA's Kol Israel stations broadcast theirs.

== Education ==
Many young journalists start out by learning about broadcast journalism through high school courses. They learn how to navigate the newsroom and equipment, and they learn the ethics and standards of journalism. Although learning the responsibilities of a journalist is important, education is required to work in broadcast journalism. A bachelor's degree in journalism, broadcast journalism or interactive media can lead to a career in broadcast production. However, a large amount of the education they receive is via hands-on activity through internships and working for on-campus broadcasting stations. This real world view of the field combined with classes that teach students the ins and outs of writing, capturing video, interviewing and editing creates a developed and prepared journalist. Finding a job in the broadcasting field can be tough due to the decreased viewing and limited number of stations in each location; however, thanks to the online media presence, it was predicted that employment would grow by 6% from 2020 to 2030.

== News jobs ==
News anchors (formerly "anchormen") serve as masters-of-ceremonies and are usually shown facing a professional video camera in a television studio while reading unseen teleprompters. The anchors are often in pairs (co-anchors), who sit side by side and often alternate their reading. Meteorologists stand in front of chroma key backgrounds to describe weather forecasting and show maps and pictures. Reporters research and write the stories and sometimes use video editing to prepare the story for air into a "package". Reporters are usually engaged in electronic field production (EFP) and are accompanied by a videographer at the scenes of the news; the latter holds the camera. The [ videographer] or assistants manage the audio and lighting; they are in charge of setting up live television shots and might edit using a non-linear editing system (NLE). Segment producers choose, research and write stories, as well as deciding the timing and arrangement of the newscast. Associate producer, if any, specialize in other elements of the show such as graphics.

=== Production jobs ===
A newscast director is in charge of television show preparation, including assigning camera and talent (cast) positions on the set, as well as selecting the camera shots and other elements for either recorded or live television video production. The technical director (TD) operates the video switcher, which controls and mixes all the elements of the show. At smaller stations, the Director and Technical Director are the same person.

A graphics operator operates a character generator (CG) that produces the lower third on-screen titles and full-page digital on-screen graphics. The audio technician operates the audio mixing console. The technician is in charge of the microphones, music and audio tape. Often, production assistants operate the teleprompters and professional video cameras and serve as lighting and rigging technicians (grips).

=== Business changes ===
Broadcast journalism is changing rapidly, causing issues within the business as well. Many people can no longer find jobs in broadcast journalism because much more is online and does not even need to be broadcast by a person. Others are being laid off to invest more money into new technologies. Other changes include innovations allowing TV stations to better alert viewers in emergencies and have higher quality services.

== Online convergence ==
Convergence is the sharing and cross-promoting of content from a variety of media, all of which, in theory, converge and become one medium. In broadcast news, the internet is a key to convergence. Frequently, broadcast journalists also write text stories for the Web, usually accompanied by the graphics and sound of the original story. Websites offer the audience an interactive form where they can learn more about a story, can be referred to related articles, can offer comments for publication and can print stories at home. Technological convergence also lets newsrooms collaborate with other media, broadcast outlets sometimes have partnerships with their print counterparts.

== Social media ==
Citizen broadcast journalism is a new form of technology that has allowed regular civilians to post stories they see through outlets such as Snapchat, Facebook, and Twitter. It has become a new trend that some allegedly fear will take over broadcast journalism as it is known. News companies, like Fox News, are employing citizen journalists, which is a new phenomenon in journalism.

== Fake news ==
The terms "fake news" and "yellow journalism" have taken over broadcast journalism throughout the years. Its impact on broadcast journalism played a role in how news about the election was spread. Fake news defines how viewers see news that may be misleading or false. The main aim of yellow journalism is to gather the attention of people in the society.

== See also ==
- 24-hour news cycle
- Broadcasting
- Broadcasting of sports events
- CNN effect
- Correspondent
- Digital journalism
- Media event
- Sports commentator
