= Rosedale Gang =

The Rosedale Gang is the name used to refer to the group of individuals that advise Liberal Party of Canada leader Michael Ignatieff. The term pokes fun at the fact that many from this group were either born or have worked in Toronto prior to joining Ignatieff's Ottawa team. Rosedale is a wealthy, old money neighbourhood in Toronto.

The term 'Rosedale Gang' first appeared in a Toronto Star story which credited the term to an anonymous source within the Liberal party. This group has also been referred to as the 'Bloc Torontois'.

== Senior members ==
- Ian Davey - former Chief of Staff to Leader of the Opposition Michael Ignatieff and son of Senator Keith Davey. Credited as one of the Liberals who ventured to Harvard and convinced Ignatieff to return to Canada. Prior to his political work, Davey has worked as an independent television producer in Toronto.
- Dan Brock - Principal Secretary to the Opposition Leader, prior to joining Ignatieff's office, Brock worked as a lawyer in a large Toronto firm.
- Alfred Apps - President of the Liberal Party of Canada and the only member of the group who lives in Rosedale, described by Globe and Mail political affairs columnist Jane Taber as, "a well-connected Bay Street lawyer and one of the Liberals responsible for plucking Michael Ignatieff from Harvard and bringing him back to Canada."
- Jill Fairbrother - Communications Advisor to the Opposition Leader, has been with Ignatieff since his leadership and has frequently been quoted in the media as his spokesperson.
- Rocco Rossi - National Director of the Liberal Party, Rossi is the former CEO of the Heart and Stroke Foundation and has been recruited by Ignatieff to turn around the Liberals' fundraising efforts. Resigned in December 2009 to run for Mayor of Toronto.

== Controversy ==
On September 28, 2009, Denis Coderre, the Liberal Member of Parliament for Bourassa, announced that he was resigning from his post as the Liberals' Quebec Lieutenant. His resignation arose from a dispute between Ignatieff's Toronto advisors and Coderre over the selection of former Cabinet Minister Martin Cauchon as a Liberal Candidate in an upcoming election.
