= WCSP-FM =

C-SPAN public affairs radio station in Washington, D.C.

- Washington, D.C.; United States
- Broadcast area: Washington metropolitan area
- Frequency: 90.1 MHz (HD Radio)
- RDS: WCSP
- Branding: C-SPAN Radio

Programming
- Language: English
- Format: Public affairs
- Subchannels: HD2: C-SPAN1 simulcast (House and other); HD3: C-SPAN2 simulcast (Senate and Book TV)
- Network: C-SPAN
- Affiliations: Associated Press

Ownership
- Owner: Cable-Satellite Public Affairs Network; (National Cable Satellite Corporation)

History
- First air date: October 28, 1960
- Former call signs: WGTB-FM (1960–1980); WDCU (1980–1997)
- Call sign meaning: First three letters of C-SPAN, the Cable-Satellite Public Affairs Network

Technical information
- Licensing authority: FCC
- Facility ID: 68950
- Class: B
- ERP: 24,000 watts
- HAAT: 216 meters (709 ft)
- Transmitter coordinates: 38°57′1″N 77°4′46″W

Links
- Public license information: Public file; LMS
- Webcast: Listen live (via TuneIn)
- Website: www.c-span.org/c-span-radio/

WCSP-FM (90.1 FM, "C-SPAN Radio") is a radio station owned by the Cable-Satellite Public Affairs Network (C-SPAN) in Washington, D.C. The station is licensed to C-SPAN's corporate owner, the National Cable Satellite Corporation, and broadcasts 24 hours a day. Its studios are located near Capitol Hill in C-SPAN’s headquarters. In addition to WCSP-FM, C-SPAN Radio programming is also available online at c-span.org and via satellite radio on SiriusXM channel 455. WCSP-FM broadcasts in the HD (digital) format.

Prior to C-SPAN's acquisition of the 90.1 frequency in 1997, the station operated as WGTB-FM, the student radio station of Georgetown University, from 1960 to 1979. Increasingly contentious relations between students and university administration led Georgetown to sell the license to the University of the District of Columbia, which operated a jazz-format station as WDCU from 1982 to 1997.

== History ==
=== WGTB at Georgetown University ===
On May 25, 1960, Georgetown University received a construction permit to build a new noncommercial radio station which would operate with 771 watts on 90.1 MHz, a move five years in the planning. WGTB had operated since 1946, as a carrier current station, but new buildings on the Georgetown campus were not being equipped to radiate the station. At the time of WGTB's debut on FM, programming included discussions on issues, taped programs from other colleges, Georgetown sports, and "every kind of music with the exception of rock and roll". Like many campus stations of its day, WGTB only broadcast during the school year. Carrier current broadcasts were discontinued in 1963, citing poor performance and high costs. Few people outside the campus listened; a 1968 survey showed that WGTB had the second-lowest FM listenership in Washington, only ahead of WAMU at American University.

Concentration will be on selecting people who are interested in a particular area of music and providing them with complete freedom to express this interest.

— Peter Barry Chowka, WGTB-FM program director in 1970, on the station's move to a full freeform format

As the 1960s became the 1970s, WGTB-FM transformed from a small educational outlet into a much more powerful station with a defined format. The station went to 24-hour broadcasting by February 1970; that June, the Federal Communications Commission approved a major power increase for the station, to 14,720 watts. Both changes in format and technical parameters brought growing pains, however. The station's new progressive rock format, eliminating all block programming, made it a bastion of liberalism on a rather conservative campus. In late 1970, Rev. Francis Heyden, former WGTB faculty moderator, leveled charges at the station that it had failed to conform to its approved format, played "indecent and anti-Semitic" records, and had purchased inferior equipment. Student board members, with the aid of an FCC official, investigated the charges and found them "entirely unfounded". After a brief suspension, WGTB-FM was allowed to return to the air by administration after an arbitration panel was convened to resolve the dispute.

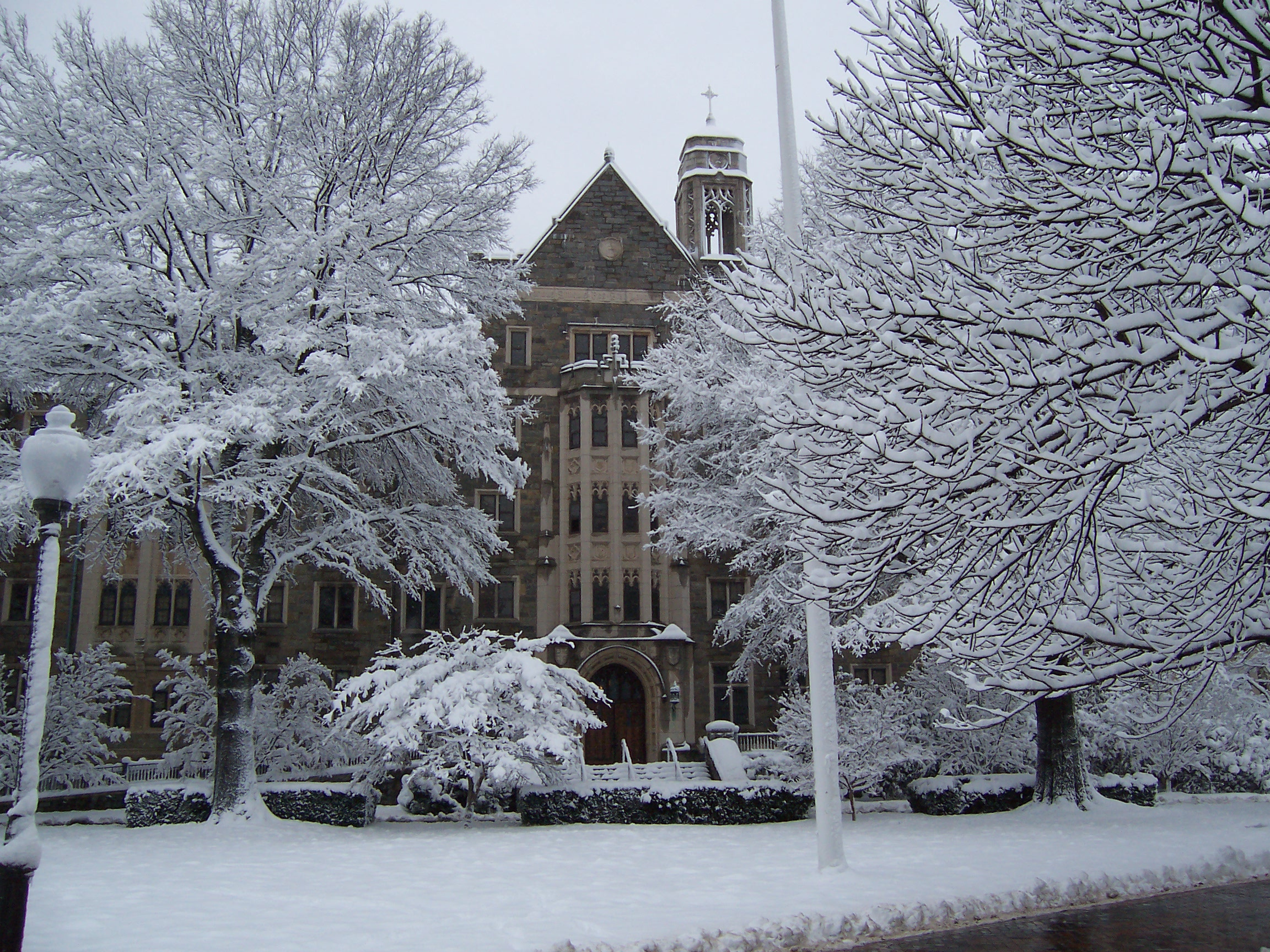
The WGTB-FM tower was mounted on Copley Hall for the station's first decade on air

Even then, however, the station faced two new technical setbacks in the span of a month. In February 1971, administration ordered the station to go off air or revert to its former 771-watt status, claiming that the transmitter was disrupting equipment in a science building. A compromise was reached to keep the station off the air during daytime hours so as not to affect the equipment, used in laser research funded by the United States Air Force. While a solution was sought to the interference issue, weather intervened as gusty winds toppled the new tower mounted atop Copley Hall, destroying the antenna.

While WGTB-FM was off the air, administration acted. Led by president Robert J. Henle, a study was conducted in the summer of 1971 which recommended the station be returned to air as soon as possible, that a professional be appointed to manage it, and a move back to a more block format and away from the rock-heavy sound that WGTB had adopted in 1970. Broadcasting resumed at reduced power that fall using a portion of the fallen tower. The ultimate solution to the interference problem was to move the transmitter off the campus: it was relocated to the American University campus in 1973.

The station's rock format also attracted renewed attention over its service to the community versus its responsiveness to the needs of students. Critics inside and outside student government pushed for changes to the format, such as basketball game broadcasts, and noted that just 30 percent of students listened to the station, though this was still a higher share than WMAL, then the city's leading commercial station with 18 percent of the market. President Henle ordered a new reorganization in 1975, which put the station under the control of a six-member review board; in doing so, he warned, "if the station cannot be made to contribute to the educational and religious mission of this University, then after another year, I will recommend to the Board of Directors that we sell the license and close the station".

Even as university administration tried to steer its station in a new direction, new controversies arose over its broadcast of public service announcements for the Washington Free Clinic, which distributed information about abortions and birth control, resulting in the firing of general manager Ken Sleeman. The review board seized operational and editorial control of WGTB from the station board, removing records with sensitive language from airplay and leading to a full special edition of student newspaper The Hoya. Georgetown leadership began to examine its options for the station; while students overwhelmingly sought its continued operation, one administrator fretted that the money needed to make the station "productive to the University" could turn it into a financial liability, and others warned that if GU exited broadcasting by selling WGTB-FM, it would be very difficult to return.

In February 1976, new obscenity complaints emerged, this time about a poetry reading aired at 8 a.m. that had been approved for an 11 p.m. slot. On March 16, 1976, the university ordered the station off air in order to reorganize again and hire a new general manager. With the station in the middle of a license renewal, potential interest from other groups emerged; one of these, the Committee to Save Alternative Radio (headed by former manager Sleeman), filed a petition to deny against the renewal in April 1976. Another group, the Catholic University of America, examined entering the fray but opted against it. CSAR members blasted the new WGTB, which returned to the air in June, as "a sterile college radio station" and even picked up former station host and district councilman John A. Wilson as an ally.

=== From Georgetown to UDC ===
WGTB returned to the air, and its license was renewed in November 1977, but the damage had been done. In April 1978, Georgetown president Timothy S. Healy, describing WGTB as "a great animal in the wrong zoo", announced that the university planned to shutter the station and sell the facility. After approaching Duke Ellington School of the Arts, which said it was not ready to handle operations, Georgetown opted to transfer the station to the University of the District of Columbia (UDC) for $1; the University of Maryland was also interested, but Georgetown wanted the new owners to be based in D.C. If the UDC had turned down the bid, the Roman Catholic Archdiocese of Washington would have purchased WGTB-FM to operate as a Spanish-language station; Spanish-language WFAN (1340 AM) closed that same month after a series of indiscretions by ownership led to the revocation of its license. Station volunteer staff blamed recent troubles facing WGTB-FM on the station manager that been brought on board following the 1976 shutdown.

Despite the formation of an Alliance to Preserve Radio at Georgetown that opposed the UDC sale, WGTB-FM went off the air at 12:34 p.m. on January 31, 1979, as a crowd of 400 people protested in Healy Circle, with most of them marching to FCC headquarters. Together with protests about United States involvement in Iran, the WGTB rally marked the most protest activity on the campus since 1971.

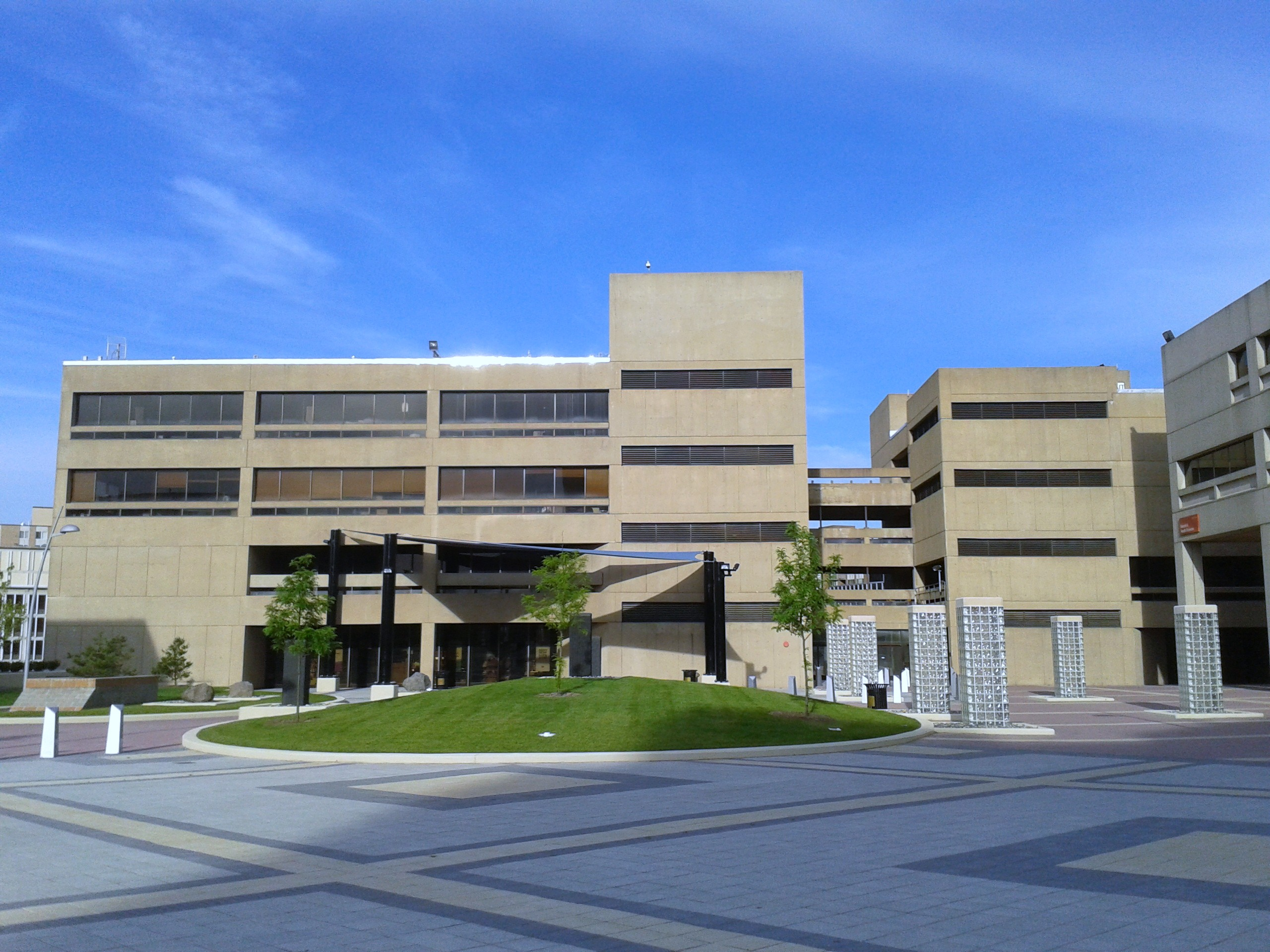
WDCU was housed in Building 38 at UDC's Van Ness campus

On March 12, 1980, the FCC approved the sale of WGTB-FM to UDC; the call letters were changed to WDCU on June 6. However, the 90.1 frequency remained silent for another two years following FCC approval, with the university seeking a move of the studios and transmitter. It was not until March 1982 that the station unveiled its plans for a jazz music station with weekend classical music programming and six hours a week in Spanish, with the station finally signing on May 1.

The University of the District of Columbia constantly struggled to bring in money for the station, which had just three full-time employees and never raised more than $200,000 in any year since its launch. However, the station did win a major power boost in 1994, after ending a six-year fight with television station WFTY, which broadcast from the Hughes Memorial Tower next to the site where WDCU was already broadcasting; the increase to 50,000 watts also filled in reception issues in parts of the District and added some 900,000 people to the station's coverage area.

When the District's financial situation worsened and prompted the creation by Congress of a District of Columbia Financial Control Board with the authority to close its financial shortfalls, combined with a $16 million budget deficit at UDC, it became obvious that WDCU was going to be sold. After months of speculation and rumors of interest by George Washington University, WETA and others, WDCU was put up for sale in May 1997, when the board retained a station brokerage.

In late June 1997, UDC trustees voted to sell WDCU to Community Resource Educational Association, a nonprofit affiliate of Christian religious broadcaster Salem Communications, for $13 million; the university retained the station's recording library. This came after a joint bid by WAMU and WETA to preserve the station as a jazz outlet was priced out by religious bidders. One loud voice protesting the sale made its appeal directly to the Control Board: the Corporation for Public Broadcasting, which demanded to be reimbursed for $1 million in federal grants awarded to WDCU since 1991. Other public radio entities announced plans to challenge the sale at the FCC, including formal petitions by NPR and the Media Access Project.

The opposition prompted Salem to ask C-SPAN, which had previously bid $10.5 million, if it was willing to increase its bid to $13 million and buy out Salem's portion of the contract; the move alleviated some of the pressure on the university, though it still displaced all of WDCU's jazz and specialty shows.

Once the station was purchased, broadcasting of C-SPAN Radio on WCSP-FM began on October 9, 1997.

=== As WCSP-FM ===
There are people all over this country who are addicted to C-SPAN, and especially in this town. Now they can listen during all those hours they spend in the car.

— Leo Hindery, president of the board of C-SPAN, on the launch of C-SPAN Radio in 1997

C-SPAN Radio expanded its coverage by signing programming agreements in 1998 with the two subscription-only satellite radio systems: CD Radio (later renamed Sirius Satellite Radio) and General Motors' XM Satellite Radio, bringing the station to a nationwide audience in 2001. Temporarily for a year during the SiriusXM merger in 2007 and 2008, it was not heard on Sirius, and it is not currently available on radios only compatible with the older Sirius system. The station was added to XM Radio Canada on April 1, 2007. The FM range of the radio station extends as far north as Hanover, Pennsylvania, south around 15 miles beyond Fredericksburg, Virginia, west to 5 miles east of Front Royal, Virginia, and east to Cambridge, Maryland. C-SPAN offers three channels of programming for listeners within the FM signal radius with HD radios, using digital technology to multicast all three channels at 90.1 FM. The three channels offer different programming: WCSP-FM's usual programming is broadcast on 90.1 HD1; 90.1 HD2 simulcasts C-SPAN, broadcasting coverage of the House of Representatives plus other C-SPAN programming; 90.1 HD3 simulcasts C-SPAN2, broadcasting coverage of the Senate and audio of Book TV.

== Programming ==
C-SPAN Radio broadcasts public-affairs programming, including some audio simulcasts of C-SPAN's flagship television programs like Washington Journal and some radio-only programming such as the famous tape-recorded Oval Office conversations from the Johnson and Nixon administrations, oral histories, and some committee meetings and press conferences not shown on television due to programming commitments. The radio station does not try to duplicate C-SPAN television coverage, and takes a more selective approach to its broadcast content. Regular programs broadcast on the radio station include Today in Washington and Prime Minister's Question Time. The station also broadcasts full gavel-to-gavel coverage of political conventions in election years.

In the early period of C-SPAN Radio's existence, programming also included coverage of local events and government hearings affecting only the Washington region. A unique part of WCSP's programming is its rebroadcast of five Sunday morning talk shows, without commercials, in rapid succession. All programs on C-SPAN Radio are broadcast commercial-free.

WCSP-FM is the first radio station to broadcast audiotape of historical U.S. Supreme Court oral arguments, with announcers explaining the court decision at the end of the recording. The broadcasts of the Supreme Court arguments have provided listeners in the U.S. and Canada with the opportunity to hear spoken words during oral arguments for several of the Court's most influential cases, including the Texas v. Johnson argument over flag-burning in 1989, and the Miranda v. Arizona argument in 1966. In September 2010 the Supreme Court began releasing audio recordings of the week's oral arguments each Friday, thereby allowing C-SPAN Radio to broadcast a selection of current arguments. Prior to this arrangement, recordings of oral arguments were occasionally made available on a same-day basis, which C-SPAN would request in cases of high public interest. When the court began live telephonic oral arguments during the COVID-19 pandemic, C-SPAN Radio began carrying those.
