= The Ben Mulroney Show =

Canadian radio talk show

- Genre: Talk radio
- Running time: 3 hours
- Country of origin: Canada
- Language: English
- Home station: 640 Toronto
- Syndicates: Corus Talk Radio Network
- Hosted by: Ben Mulroney
- Original release: November 25, 2024 – present

The Ben Mulroney Show is a Canadian syndicated talk radio program hosted by Ben Mulroney and produced by Corus Entertainment. It debuted on November 25, 2024, on 640 Toronto and is carried by Corus talk radio stations in several Canadian cities.

== History ==
Corus Entertainment announced the program in November 2024. Mulroney had previously hosted weekend mornings on 640 Toronto and worked at Bell Media, leaving the CTV Television Network in 2021.

The program airs weekdays from 9:00 a.m. to noon on 640 Toronto. Its first hour covers news and issues affecting Toronto, Hamilton and Ontario. The remaining two hours cover national affairs and are syndicated to Corus stations in London, Calgary, Edmonton, Winnipeg and Vancouver. The program includes commentary, interviews and listener calls.

In June 2025, Corus introduced a video version of the program on YouTube. At the time, the company reported nearly 1.3 million podcast downloads.

== Broadcast ==
The program originates from 640 Toronto and is carried on the following stations:

- 640 Toronto
- AM 980 (London)
- QR 770 Calgary (Calgary)
- 880 CHED (Edmonton)
- 680 CJOB (Winnipeg)
- 980 CKNW (Vancouver)

The Ontario stations carry all three hours, while the western stations carry the final two hours.

== See also ==
- 640 Toronto
- Corus Entertainment
- Ben Mulroney
