= George Radwanski =

Canadian journalist and public servant

4th Privacy Commissioner of Canada
- In office 2000–2003
- Preceded by: Bruce Phillips
- Succeeded by: Robert Marleau

Personal details
- Born: February 28, 1947 Baden-Baden, West Germany
- Died: September 18, 2014 (aged 67) Toronto, Ontario, Canada

George Radwanski (February 28, 1947 – September 18, 2014) was a Canadian public servant, policy adviser, journalist and author. He was the editor of The Toronto Star in the early 1980s. After he stepped away from journalism, he authored an influential report on Ontario's secondary education system in 1988 that recommended "destreaming" high schools. He subsequently authored an influential report on Canada Post that recommended not to privatize it in 1996. He was appointed by Prime Minister Jean Chretien to be the Privacy Commissioner of Canada at the turn of the 21st century. He resigned in 2003 after a scandal about how he managed spending in his office. He was charged with fraud for his office spending, but was exonerated in 2009 of all charges. He died in 2014.

== Journalism ==
In 1965 he began working as a reporter for the Montreal Gazette subsequently becoming a columnist, associate editor and national affairs columnist for the paper. He then moved to the Financial Times of Canada where he worked as the national affairs columnist and Ottawa editor. In the late 1970s he went to the Toronto Star where he served as editorial page editor and then editor-in-chief.

In his journalism career, Radwanski won two National Newspaper Awards for editorial writing. In 1971, Simon & Schuster published his and Kendal Windeyer's paperback book No Mandate But Terror, an account of the October Crisis. Macmillan of Canada published his best-selling non-fiction book,Trudeau, in 1978. It was a political biography of then-Prime Minister Pierre Elliot Trudeau.

== Post-journalism career ==
=== Radwanski Report ===
Radwanski resigned from the Star in June 1985. In 1987 he accepted an appointment by Ontario Premier David Peterson to head up an inquiry for the Ministry of Education into Ontario's secondary school drop-out problem. Radwanski's findings were published on February 15, 1988, as the Ontario Study of the Relevance of Education, and the Issue of Dropouts commonly known as the Radwanski Report. Radwanski concluded that the education system had become irrelevant due to the economy's shift from the manufacturing sector to services sector. He found that students were uninterested in what they were being taught and did not gain the skills and knowledge necessary to succeed in a modern economy. He issued a series of recommendations including the implementation of early childhood education, standardized testing, "destreaming" of high schools, an "outcome-based" education and the replacement of the credit system with a common core curriculum.

Several of his recommendations were taken up by subsequent governments including destreaming in grade nine (though not later), an outcomes-based curriculum in grades 1 to 9 and standardized testing at various levels.

=== Consultant years ===
Following his study, Radwanski became a public policy and communications consultant in both the public and private sectors. In 1996 he was appointed by the federal government to conduct a review of Canada Post Corporation's mandate and suggested that it should not be privatized, get out of delivering junk mail, and stop closing rural post offices, amongst many other recommendations. Radwanski also served as a speech writer to Prime Minister Jean Chrétien, who later appointed him Privacy Commissioner.

== Privacy Commissioner ==
As Privacy Commissioner, Radwanski was outspoken in his criticism of increased surveillance by the state in the wake of the 9-11 attacks early in his tenure and the subsequent "war on terror". In his annual report in the months following 9-11, he asserted:

"The fundamental human right of privacy in Canada is under assault as never before. Unless the Government of Canada is quickly dissuaded from its present course by Parliamentary action and public insistence, we are on a path that may well lead to the permanent loss not only of privacy rights but also important elements of freedom as we now know it..."

"The Government is, quite simply, using September 11 as an excuse for new [surveillance databases] that cannot be justified by the requirements of anti-terrorism and that, indeed, have no place in a free and democratic society..."

Radwanski successfully campaigned against and brought an end to major federal government intrusions on privacy rights, including provisions of Bill C-36 that would have undermined the Privacy Act; the opening of letter mail by Customs agents; and the creation of a comprehensive, all-purpose six-year Canada Customs and Revenue Agency data base on the foreign travel activities of all Canadians. He initiated a Charter challenge, later aborted by his successor, against RCMP video surveillance of public streets as a municipal police force in Kelowna, B.C., and gave 93 speeches in less than three years across Canada and abroad, along with hundreds of media interviews, to raise public awareness about privacy issues in the post-9/11 environment. He also oversaw the smooth implementation of the new federal private sector privacy law, the Personal Information Protection and Electronic Documents Act, that came into effect beginning in 2001.

=== Expense claims and trial ===
Radwanski resigned in June 2003, less than half way into his seven-year term, while under attack by a parliamentary committee for lavish spending. An investigation by the parliamentary committee charged that he racked up $500,000 in travel and hospitality expenses and misled the House of Commons of Canada over lax spending practices in his office. The committee also accused Radwanski of falsifying a document sent to it. On November 6, 2003, Radwanski apologized to Parliament "without reservation" for showing lack of respect, and expressed remorse for "errors in judgment with regard to administrative and financial matters" during his tenure. MPs later voted unanimously to find him in contempt of Parliament for providing misleading information about his spending.

On March 15, 2006 Radwanski was charged with fraud and breach of trust following a 26-month-long Royal Canadian Mounted Police investigation into his expense claims while a public servant that was prompted by the Auditor General's report. He was acquitted on all counts on February 13, 2009, with the judge criticizing Radwanski's "negligent and cavalier approach to accounting for expenses" but concluding that the "prosecution was not able to prove that what he was doing was out of line with other bureaucrats at the time". However, his former chief of staff Art Lamarche was convicted for breach of trust by an Ontario Court judge.

Radwanski's friend and Ottawa lawyer Michael Crystal described the charges as “quite unfair”, saying “Here was someone who had been exonerated, who had been a very good privacy commissioner, had been given the cold shoulder by political Ottawa, and was left to fend for himself with a black cloud over his head.”

== Personal ==
He was born in 1947 in Baden-Baden, West Germany. Radwanski attended Loyola High School before earning degrees in political science and law from McGill University.

His son, Adam Radwanski, was a political affairs columnist for The Globe and Mail until 2026, when he joined the Toronto Star. George Radwanski died of a heart attack on September 18, 2014.
