= Lethbridge Polytechnic =

Canadian polytechnic institute (est. 1957)

- Blackfoot: Ohkotoki’aahkkoiyiiniimaan, Stone Pipe
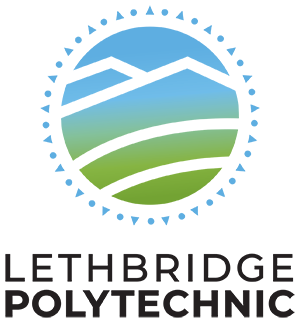
- Former names: Lethbridge Junior College (1957-1969); Lethbridge Community College (1969-2007); Lethbridge College (2007-2024)
- Motto: Latin: Ex Disciplina Docti
- Motto in English: Learned from training
- Type: Public
- Established: 1957; 69 years ago
- Academic affiliations: CICan, AACTI, CBIE
- President: Dr. Brad Donaldson
- Faculty: 300+
- Students: 4,759 (2023-24 fulltime equivalent)
- Location: 3000 College Drive S Lethbridge, Alberta, Canada; T1K 1L6; 49.6620°N 112.8092°W
- Campus: Urban 37 ha (370,000 m^{2})
- Colours: Blue and Green
- Nickname: Kodiaks
- Sporting affiliations: ACAC, CCAA
- Mascot: Kodi the Kodiak
- Website: www.lethpolytech.ca

Lethbridge Polytechnic (also known as LethPolytech), formerly Lethbridge College, is a public polytechnic institute located in Lethbridge, Alberta, Canada, with regional campuses in Claresholm, Vulcan, Pincher Creek, and the Crowsnest Pass.

Lethbridge Polytechnic is ranked as one of the top 50 research colleges in Canada and has over 6,900 students enrolled in more than 65 certificate, diploma, applied degree, bachelor's degree, pre-employment, and apprenticeship programs. Lethbridge Polytechnic is a member of the Rural Development Network.

== History ==
Lethbridge Junior College was established in 1957 as the first publicly funded college in Canada. In 1969, in response to the opening of the University of Lethbridge, the college refined its mission and motivations, and changed its name to "Lethbridge Community College". On 14 February 2007, to mark its 50th anniversary, the college's Board of Governors voted to once again change its name, this time to "Lethbridge College".

On 25 June 2024, the Alberta government announced the college would become the province's newest polytechnic institute - Lethbridge Polytechnic, to reflect the institution's growth and ability to expand its programming.

== Academics ==
Lethbridge Polytechnic offers preparatory studies, vocational training, and university transfer programs in 50 career fields, leading to one-year certificates, two-year diplomas, apprenticeships, and bachelor's degrees. Lethbridge Polytechnic provides applied bachelor's degrees and has transfer agreements with the University of Alberta, Athabasca University, University of Calgary, and University of Lethbridge for students who wish to transfer and/or further their studies with a bachelor's degree.

Lethbridge Polytechnic contains four academic centres which deliver its educational programs:

- Applied Arts & Sciences
- Health & Wellness
- Justice & Human Services
- Trades and Technologies

== Locations ==
Lethbridge Polytechnic's main campus is in Lethbridge, with regional campuses in Claresholm, Vulcan, Pincher Creek, and the Crowsnest Pass.

== Athletics ==
Lethbridge Polytechnic competes in the Alberta Colleges Athletic Conference. The college fields men's and women's teams in basketball, soccer, volleyball, golf and cross country running. The teams are known as the Kodiaks.

The men's cross country team won the 2006 ACAC Championship, and the National Championship. The women's team also won National titles in 2003 and 2004. The women's basketball team won their second ACAC gold medal in 4 years, defeating defending champion Mount Royal College 67–59. They won the bronze medal at the 2006 Canadian Colleges Athletic Association National Championships in Cornwall, Ontario, where they defeated the Okanagan Lakers 79–77.

== Media ==
Lethbridge Polytechnic has an on-campus media organization called Lethbridge Campus Media, operated by the second-year students in the Digital Communications and Media program as a part of their curriculum. Within the organization, students curate the online presence; Endeavour newspaper, published four times during the academic year; CRLC The Kodiak, an online radio station; and eNews, a news program broadcast through their website and locally through Shaw TV in the Winter semester. The students also create Expressions Magazine in the winter semester.

Wider Horizons is Lethbridge Polytechnic's community magazine and celebrates the successes and accomplishments of Lethbridge Polytechnic's students, staff, alumni and community partners by promoting them throughout the community and around the world. The publication aims to educate its readers, engage polytechnic stakeholders and recognize donors through compelling stories and images that relate to, and resonate with, its readers. It was launched in 2007 as part of the college's 50th anniversary celebrations.

The magazine has won multiple awards during the last four years, including gold awards in the CASE Circle of Excellence awards program for community college magazines and won a gold award for feature writing in the most recent CASE VIII competition.

== Student Association ==
Lethbridge Polytechnic Students' Association (LPSA) is the voice of students on campus and strives to support students during their academic journey. LPSA consists of a student council and LPSA staff. The LPSA student council is made up of six student representatives and three executives whose responsibility is to make decisions in the best interest of Lethbridge Polytechnic students and provide input on their behalf at Lethbridge Polytechnic board meetings. LPSA staff facilitate social events, recreation programs, awareness activities, foodbank services, and much more.

The LPSA operates a social space on campus called The Cave, which features lounge-style seating, large windows with natural light, TVs, and a variety of games.

== Leadership ==
Presidents
Name	Term start	Term end
W. J. ‘‘Jim’’ Cousins	1957	1963
Carl B. Johnson	1963	1967
Dr. Charles D. Stewart	1967	1975
Donald W. Anderson	1976	1979
Les Talbot	1979	1990
Dr. Donna J. Allan	1990	2005
Dr. Tracy L. Edwards	2005	2012
Dr. Paula Burns	2013	2022
Dr. Brad Donaldson	2022	

== Notable alumni ==
- Hal Anderson, journalist
- Wayne Balcaen, politician
- Shane Dawson, athlete
- Brent Fikowski, athlete
- Blaine Hyggen, politician
- Dustin Molleken, athlete
- Troy Reeb, broadcasting executive
- Kyle Yamada, athlete
