= Global Currents =

Canadian news television series

Original release
- Release: September 23, 2006 – May 31, 2008

Global Currents is a Canadian news television series, which aired weekly on Global Television Network. Hosted by Kevin Newman, the series airs one documentary film each week.

The series originally launched in 2005, replacing the newsmagazine series Global Sunday. Initially, there was no umbrella title for the series, with each week's documentary promoted under its own individual title. The title Global Currents began to be used in 2007.

The series was shown Saturday evenings at 7 p.m., save for the autumn of 2007 when it was shown at 10 p.m.

== Episode list ==
=== 2006 ===
No.	Title	Original release date
1	"GREENPEACE: Making a Stand"	23 September 2006
2	"Health Care 911: The Plight of Immigrant Medical Doctors"	30 September 2006
3	"Breaking Ranks"	7 October 2006
4	"Dads Who Fought Back"	14 October 2006
5	"Polygamy’s Lost Boys"	21 October 2006
6	"The Stamp Fishery: Loss of a Dream"	28 October 2006
7	"Somba K’e – The Money Place"	4 November 2006
A journey to the arctic and into mine from whence came the uranium that was used to bomb Hiroshima and Nagasaki.
8	"DecAIDS: Anything is Possible"	11 November 2006
9	"100 Days of Freedom"	25 November 2006
After many years in prison three ex-cons try to make their lives better than what they were that lead to their incarceration.
10	"Damage Done: The Drug War Odyssey"	9 December 2006
11	"Rich Nation"	16 December 2006

=== 2007 ===
No.	Title	Directed by	Original release date
12	"Homefront"	Unknown	10 March 2007
Five military families and the sacrifices they make while their loved ones are at war in Afghanistan.
13	"Thin Ice"	Unknown	17 March 2007
14	"Shattered Dreams"	Unknown	31 March 2007
15	"Corporations in the Classroom"	Unknown	7 April 2007
16	"Big Business, Big Union, Small Town"	Unknown	5 May 2007
17	"Death In The Forest"	Gordon McLennan	13 October 2007
British Columbia's logging industry is viewed from the perspective of 'tree fallers'. While it is one of the most profitable industries the relaxed safety standards, cutbacks, and deregulation have left it quite deadly.
18	"Stolen Sisters"	Antonio Hrynchuk	20 October 2007
The disappearance and murder of Aboriginal women in Canada has been increasing with as many as 500 women in the past two decades being victims. The difficulties and the hope that the families of the missing women experience in attempting to find their sisters, daughters, mothers, and cousins.
19	"The Bully’s Mark"	Helen Slinger	27 October 2007
The long-term psychological effects of youthful bullying and how it is spreading into the digital world with advent of social networking websites.
20	"Sabrina’s Law"	Barry Lank	3 November 2007
Sabrina Shannon died from anaphylactic shock at a young age and now her mother is raising awareness.
21	"Time Bombs"	Guylaine Maroist and Eric Ruel	10 November 2007
Canadian war veterans who are fighting the government for compensation and recognition after being intentionally exposed to radiation as human test subjects during the Cold War in the 1950s.
22	"Fatherhood Dreams"	Julia Ivanova	17 November 2007
Profiles several gay men who, in the wake of Halpern v. Canada and the Civil Marriage Act of 2005, are pursuing their long-abandoned dream of becoming fathers through adoption, surrogacy or co-parenting, profiling both their efforts and the ways in which society can make it harder for the children of homosexual couples. The film was released internationally on DVD; in 2019, Ivanova released the theatrical documentary My Dads, My Moms and Me, which revisited the families she had profiled in the original film.

=== 2008 ===
No.	Title	Original release date
23	"Hijacked Future"	22 March 2008
24	"Branded: Saving Our Town"	29 March 2008
25	"Debt Trap"	5 April 2008
26	"The Cure For Love"	12 April 2008
27	"Arctic Hip Hop"	19 April 2008
28	"Real Fight Club"	17 May 2008
29	"Warrior Boyz"	31 May 2008
