= Sunday Edition (Canadian TV program) =

- Presented by: Mike Duffy
- Country of origin: Canada

Original release
- Network: Syndicated to CTV affiliates (1989–1994); BBS (1994–1998); CTV (1998–99)
- Release: 1988 – 1999

Sunday Edition is a Canadian public affairs television program which aired from 1988 to 1999. The program was hosted by Mike Duffy and originated at CJOH-TV in Ottawa, Ontario. Over the course of its run, it aired in several different time slots from late Sunday morning to early Sunday afternoons. Its format was similar to that of American Sunday morning talk shows.

The program was at first co-operatively produced by several CTV affiliates, but at that point was not officially a CTV network program. Sunday Edition later became part of the Baton Broadcast System schedule and only officially became a CTV program in early 1998, shortly after Baton Broadcasting's acquisition of the network. At the same time, production moved to CTV's flagship studios at CFTO-TV in the Toronto suburb of Scarborough.

The show was cancelled in 1999, and Duffy moved to a role as host of a prime time talk and interview series on CTV Newsnet.

The CTV News-produced Question Period, which had been cancelled in the mid-1990s apparently due to the success of Sunday Edition, was revived in 2001 and now fills a similar role.
