= Jane Taber =

Canadian journalist (born 1957)

Jane Taber (born 1957) is a Canadian public servant, former political journalist and television host of public affairs programming. Taber was appointed Director of Communications under former Premier of Nova Scotia, Iain Rankin of the Nova Scotia Liberal Party in February 2021.

== Career ==
=== Political journalism ===
Taber reported on Parliament Hill news beginning 1986, working as a parliamentary reporter and columnist for the Ottawa Citizen, the National Post, and The Globe and Mail. For three seasons, from 1995 to 1997, she was the host of a 30-minute-long political affairs show on WTN called Jane Taber's Ottawa. She also co-produced an hour-long documentary on the struggles of women in politics broadcast during the 1997 Canadian federal election.

Working under Bell Media's umbrella of companies, Taber was co-host of CTV Television Network's Question Period with Craig Oliver from 2005 to 2011, while also a senior parliamentary writer at The Globe and Mail's Ottawa bureau from 2003 to 2012. She relocated to the newspaper's Halifax office in 2012, becoming the Atlantic Bureau Chief.

On June 26, 2011, Taber relinquished her role as co-host of Question Period to Kevin Newman. However, she continued to take part in the program as a regular guest journalist, and acted as a stand-in host for Don Martin on CTV News Channel's Power Play.

=== Public relations ===
Leaving journalism in 2016, Taber entered the public relations field as vice president of public affairs at National Public Relations (Res Publica Consulting Group) in Halifax.

Following the resignation of Nova Scotia Premier Stephen McNeil, Taber moderated the Nova Scotia Liberal Party's candidate forum for its 2021 Nova Scotia Liberal Party leadership election on December 10, 2020. While still Vice President at National Public Relations at that time, Taber was later appointed Director of Communications for the winner of the leadership race, Premier of Nova Scotia Iain Rankin, in February 2021. After Rankin's dramatic loss for the Liberals in the 2021 Nova Scotia general election on August 17, 2021, Taber rejoined National Public Relations as vice president, Public Affairs.

== Personal life ==
Educated at Carleton University, Taber was elected to its board of directors for a term of three years on July 1, 2019.

Taber is married to editor David F. Guy of allNovaScotia, a subscription-based online newspaper. They have two children.
