= The West Block =

Canadian television series

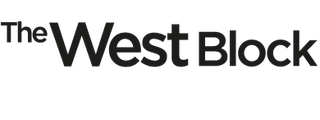
- Presented by: Tom Clark (2011–2016); Vassy Kapelos (2017–2018); Mercedes Stephenson (2018–2025); Ben Mulroney (2025–2026); Jeff Semple (2026–present)
- Country of origin: Canada

Original release
- Network: Global
- Release: October 16, 2011 – present

The West Block is a Canadian news and political affairs television series that debuted on November 6, 2011 on the Global Television Network. The name of the program is taken from the West Block of Parliament Hill.

The series follows a Sunday morning talk show format. The series was hosted by Tom Clark from 2011 until his retirement from journalism in 2016, and then by Vassy Kapelos in 2017 and 2018 until she left the network to become host of CBC News Network's Power & Politics. On June 25, 2018, Mercedes Stephenson, previously the host of Power Play on CTV News Channel, was named Global's Ottawa bureau chief and host of The West Block.

Ben Mulroney hosted the show in the 2025–26 season while Stephenson was on parental leave, followed by Jeff Semple becoming permanent host in the 2026–27 season concurrently with Stephenson's departure from the network to join The Globe and Mail.

Global Sunday, a previous Sunday public affairs show from Global, aired from 2001 to 2005.
