= Bruce Phillips (journalist) =

Canadian journalist (1930–2014)

James Bruce Ross Phillips OC (June 6, 1930 – December 6, 2014), known professionally as Bruce Phillips, was a Canadian television journalist and civil servant. He was best known as the Parliament Hill bureau chief of CTV News, and host of the political talk show Question Period, from 1968 to 1985. As host of Question Period, he was particularly noted for his year-end interviews with Prime Ministers.

Born in Fort William, Ontario, in 1930, he had his first job out of high school as a reporter for the Port Arthur News-Chronicle; his father, Alexander Phillips, was at the time the editor of the competing Fort William Times-Journal. He later worked for the Portage la Prairie Press, the Calgary Herald, Canadian Press and Southam News. He won the Bowater Award for Business and Economics Journalism in 1960, and a National Newspaper Award in 1961. Colleague Charles Lynch described Phillips as the best writer ever to grace the Parliamentary Press Gallery, stating that he was "capable of prose that came close to poetry". He was Southam News' Washington, DC correspondent in the 1960s before joining CTV in 1968.

As the Southam correspondent in Washington during the Kennedy and Johnson administrations, his coverage of American involvement in the Vietnam War so irritated administration officials that the U.S. State Department reportedly pressured Southam to recall him early, which precipitated a shift to CTV as Ottawa bureau chief.

He left CTV in 1985 to become press officer for the Embassy of Canada to the United States, and was succeeded in his parliamentary bureau role with CTV by Pamela Wallin. After two years in Washington, in 1987 he became Director of Communications in the office of Prime Minister Brian Mulroney. In 1990 he was named as Privacy Commissioner of Canada; although the Liberal caucus in both the House of Commons and the Senate tried to hold up the appointment on the grounds that Phillips was too close to Mulroney to credibly serve in a non-partisan watchdog role, he was ultimately approved in 1991. He held the position until his retirement in 2000, having received a two-year extension to his term by Prime Minister Jean Chretien, approved unanimously by the House of Commons and the Senate. During this time he succeeded in persuading Parliament to pass the Personal Information Protection and Electronic Documents Act (PIPEDA), which extended Canadians' privacy rights to the private sector. He was succeeded as privacy commissioner by George Radwanski.

He was named an Officer of the Order of Canada in 2009.
