= Vassy Kapelos =

Canadian political journalist (born 1981)

- Kapelos in 2023
- Born: Vassiliki Kapelos; May 6, 1981 (age 45); Toronto, Ontario, Canada
- Education: University of Western Ontario (BA); Dalhousie University (MA)
- Spouse: Frank Boldt (m. 2019)
- Children: 1
- Presenting career
- Show: Power Play, Question Period
- Network: CTV
- Country: Canada
- Previous shows: The West Block, Power & Politics

Vassiliki "Vassy" Kapelos (/ˈvæʃi kəˈpɛloʊs/; born May 6, 1981) is a Canadian political journalist, currently serving as the chief political correspondent for CTV News. She formerly was the host of Power & Politics on CBC News Network from 2018 to 2022. She formerly worked as the Ottawa bureau chief for Global News and the host of that network's Sunday morning political affairs show, The West Block.

In November 2022, she moved to CTV News to become the host of Power Play and Question Period.

== Early life and education ==
Kapelos graduated from the University of Western Ontario with a Bachelor of Arts degree in 2004. She then graduated from Dalhousie University with a Master of Arts degree in 2006. Kapelos is of Mainland Greek and German ethnic origin.

== Career ==
Kapelos first began reporting in Swift Current and worked for the Global Television Network's stations in Saskatoon and Edmonton, including as the Edmonton station's provincial political affairs reporter. In that role, she became best known for breaking the story about the large severance package paid out to Premier Alison Redford's outgoing chief of staff in 2013, which ultimately forced Redford to introduce a new sunshine list for public employees. In that same year, she was part of the reporting team for the series "Code Red", an investigative series on the ambulance industry in Alberta, which drew on revealing interviews with paramedics and other sources and an in-studio interview with Alberta Minister of Health Fred Horne to reveal an under-resourced industry that was endangering Alberta residents.

Kapelos transferred to the Ottawa bureau in 2013, becoming bureau chief in 2016 and host of The West Block in 2017 following the retirement of Tom Clark. In February 2018, she left Global to join CBC News Network as the new host of Power & Politics.

On November 8, 2022, CTV announced that Kapelos would become its chief political correspondent and host of two political shows, Power Play and Question Period. She replaced Evan Solomon who joined online political media outlet Gzero. She will also host The Vassy Kapelos Show on iHeartRadio.
