= Question Period (TV program) =

Canadian television news magazine

- Presented by: Vassy Kapelos
- Country of origin: Canada
- No. of seasons: 40

Original release
- Network: CTV
- Release: 1967 – present

Question Period (sometimes abbreviated QP) is a Canadian television newsmagazine which airs weekly, currently excluding the summer months, on CTV Sundays at 11:00 AM ET/8:00 AM PT. It also airs on the CTV News Channel at 5:00 PM ET. The program, which takes its name from the parliamentary process of Question Period, is an interview and panel discussion program on Canadian politics, similar to an American Sunday morning talk show.

== History ==
Debuting in 1967, Question Period is CTV's third oldest television program that is still in production behind W5 and CTV National News. However, the program was suspended from 1996 to 2001 in favour of the similar Sunday Edition with Mike Duffy, a BBS production which aired on most CTV stations and which was ultimately taken over by the network, but was then itself cancelled in 1999. Question Period would be revived in fall 2001, the announcement of which came shortly after rival network Global announced a similar public affairs program, Global Sunday, which also debuted in fall 2001 and ran for four seasons.

Craig Oliver, CTV's chief political correspondent and previously the network's Ottawa bureau chief, was co-host of Question Period throughout its current run until 2012, and previously served as a host during the final years of the program's initial run. In July 2011, CTV announced that former Global National anchor Kevin Newman had been hired to co-host the program with Oliver, with his position starting on August 22, 2011 (his first show aired September 11, 2011). Newman became the program's sole host in September 2012; Oliver remains with the network and now serves as a regular roundtable panelist on QP. For the 2013-2014 season CTV announced the Kevin Newman would be stepping down as host with Robert Fife taking his place. Newman left to focus on his new program Kevin Newman Live for CTV News Channel. Oliver remains on the show as a correspondent and as a panelist.

In June 2016, CTV announced that Evan Solomon, formerly of CBC News Network, would take over as host of the program in September. Solomon remained as host until October 2022, when he left his post (as well as his weekday hosting position at Power Play) for a publishing role in New York City.

In November 2022, Vassy Kapelos was announced as the program's new host.

== Hosts ==
- Bruce Phillips: 1968–1985
- Pamela Wallin: 1985–1992
- Craig Oliver: 1992–1996
- Craig Oliver & Edward Greenspon: 2001–2002
- Craig Oliver & John Ibbitson: 2002–2004
- Craig Oliver & Mike Duffy: 2004–2005
- Craig Oliver & Jane Taber: 2005–2011
- Craig Oliver & Kevin Newman: 2011–2012
- Kevin Newman: 2012–2013
- Robert Fife: 2013–2016
- Evan Solomon: 2016–2022
- Vassy Kapelos: 2023–Present
