= Power & Politics =

Canadian national television news program

- Title card since 2016
- Genre: News; politics
- Directed by: Gerry Buffett
- Presented by: David Cochrane
- Country of origin: Canada
- Original language: English

Production
- Production locations: CBC Ottawa Production Centre, Ottawa
- Camera setup: Multi-camera
- Running time: 120 minutes
- Production company: Canadian Broadcasting Corporation

Original release
- Network: CBC News Network
- Release: October 26, 2009 – present

Power & Politics is a Canadian television news program focused on national politics, which airs live daily on CBC News Network from 5 p.m. to 7 p.m. Eastern Time weekdays and as a syndicated podcast. The program is produced from the CBC Ottawa Production Centre in Ottawa.

== History ==
The program launched on October 26, 2009, as a replacement for the long-running CBC News: Politics, which had ended its run the preceding May with the retirement of host Don Newman. The new program was initially hosted by CBC journalist Evan Solomon. In September 2011, Rosemary Barton was added as host of the program's Friday edition after Solomon was also named host of CBC Radio One's The House. Barton also served as substitute host on other days if Solomon was unavailable, and other CBC political journalists occasionally filled in as well.

After Solomon's dismissal from the CBC on June 9, 2015, Barton served as the interim host of the show, with Terry Milewski as a back-up. On January 5, 2016, the CBC officially named Barton as the permanent host of the show. Following Barton's departure from the show in September 2017 upon being named one of the new anchors of The National, the show was hosted by various interim hosts including David Cochrane, Catherine Cullen and Terry Milewski. In March 2018, Vassy Kapelos was named the new permanent host of the show.

Kapelos left the program in November 2022 to join CTV News as host of Power Play and Question Period. After being hosted on a rotating basis by David Cochrane and Catherine Cullen, Cochrane was named as the permanent host on February 16, 2023.

Logo of Power & Politics in use from 2009 to 2016

== See also ==
- Political podcast
