= David Cochrane (journalist) =

Canadian television journalist (born 1973)

- Born: David William Cochrane; May 4, 1973 (age 53); Mount Pearl, Newfoundland and Labrador, Canada
- Occupation: Journalist
- Years active: 1997-present
- Employer: Canadian Broadcasting Corporation
- Television: Power & Politics
- Awards: Canadian Screen Award for Best Local News Reportage (2014); King Charles III Coronation Medal (2025)

David William Cochrane is a Canadian television journalist who has been the host of CBC News Network's daily show Power & Politics since February 2023.

Previously a reporter for network affiliate CBNT-DT in St. John's, Newfoundland and Labrador, he won a Canadian Screen Award for Best Local News Reportage at the 2nd Canadian Screen Awards in 2014 for his report on a major police drug smuggling investigation in the province. He joined the network's national parliamentary bureau in Ottawa as a reporter in 2016, and was sometimes seen as a fill-in host of Power & Politics prior to being named the show's permanent host in 2023. Since assuming host duties, he has covered various federal and provincial elections.

== Honours ==

Ribbon	Description	Notes
	King Charles III Coronation Medal for Canada	January 24th, 2025: The medal was presented to Cochrane for service to media by the Lieutenant Governor of Newfoundland and Labrador
