= Mercedes Stephenson =

Canadian journalist and military analyst (born c. 1981)

- Born: c. 1981
- Education: University of Calgary; Georgetown University; MIT Center for International Studies
- Occupation: Journalist
- Employer: The Globe and Mail
- Spouse: Dan Mader (2015–2021)
- Children: 1

Mercedes Stephenson (born c. 1981) is a Canadian journalist and military analyst, currently serving as the Ottawa bureau chief for The Globe and Mail.

She was born and raised in Calgary. She received a BA in political science from the University of Calgary. She did post-graduate studies at the University of Calgary Centre for Military and Strategic Studies. She studied economics and media ethics at Georgetown University. She also worked as an intern at The Pentagon and was a visiting research student at the MIT Center for International Studies.

Stephenson moved to Toronto to become host of a weekly public affairs television program. She later moved to Ottawa where she became parliamentary reporter for CTV News Channel and host of the political affairs program Power Play in 2011. In 2018, she joined Global News as Ottawa bureau chief and served in that role, including as host of the network's Sunday political talk show The West Block, until 2025, when she went on maternity leave. She would ultimately leave Global News altogether in 2026.

From 2001 to 2004, she was president of the Society for Military and Strategic Studies. She was the youngest North American military analyst covering the Iraq War. She reported from Afghanistan during the Canadian Forces mission there.

In 2004, she was named one of the 25 Best and Brightest University Stars by Maclean's magazine.

Stephenson was chosen as host of a national news program for the Sun News Network but quit shortly before the network launch in April 2011.
