= Jeff Semple =

Canadian television journalist

Jeff Semple is a Canadian television journalist, currently a senior correspondent for Global National.

Originally from Almonte, Ontario, he is a 2008 graduate of the journalism program at Ryerson University. He worked for CBC News from 2008 until 2015, when he joined Global News.

He won the Canadian Screen Award for Best National Reporter at the 13th Canadian Screen Awards in 2025. He was previously nominated in the same category at the 9th Canadian Screen Awards in 2021, and at the 11th Canadian Screen Awards in 2023.

In August 2026 he was announced as the new host of The West Block, the network's Sunday political talk show.
