= Tom Clark (journalist) =

Canadian journalist

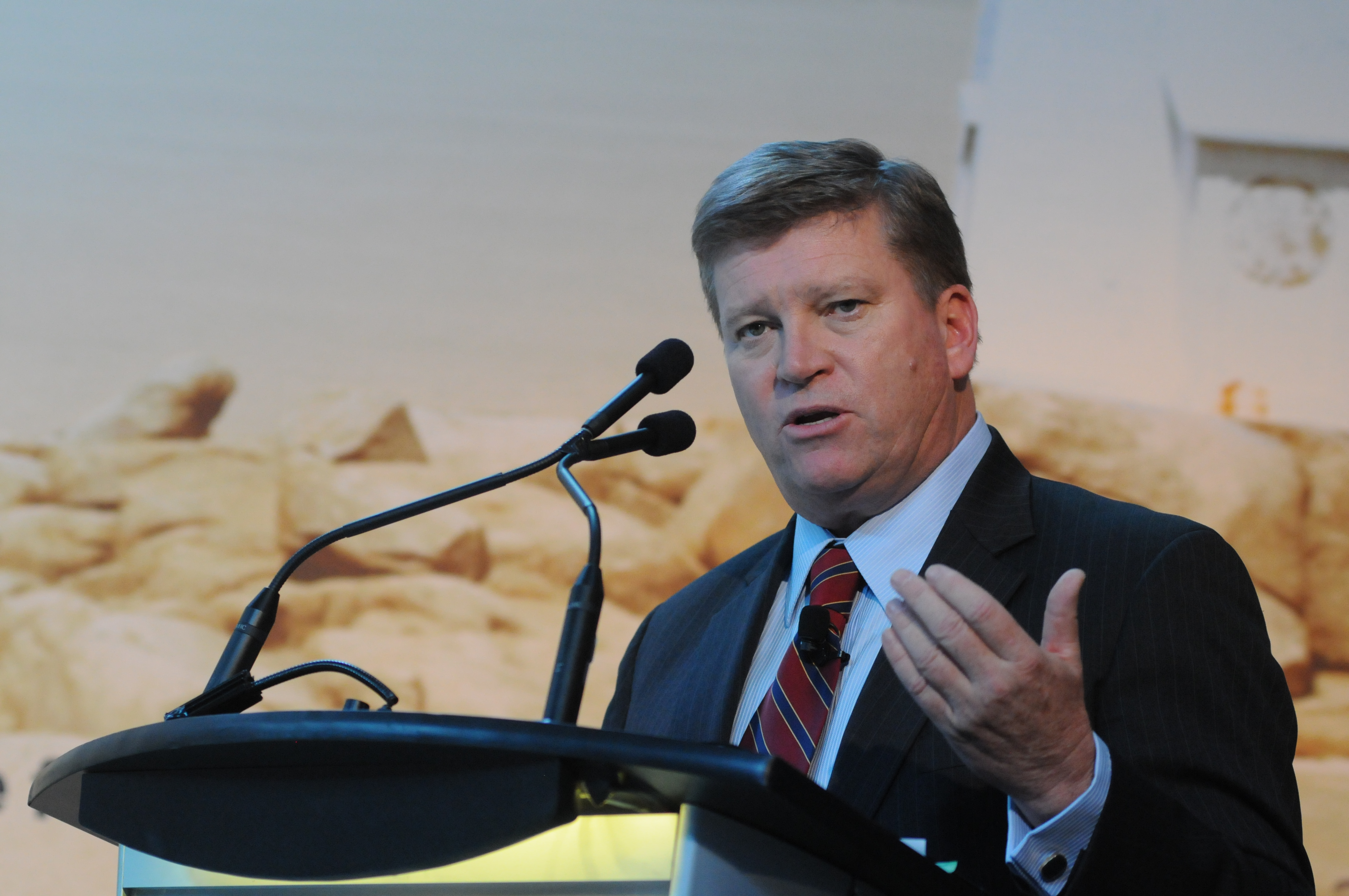
- Clark at the Halifax International Security Forum 2012
- Born: Toronto, Ontario, Canada
- Education: Upper Canada College
- Occupation: Journalist
- Known for: Power Play, The West Block

Tom Clark (born 1952/1953) is a Canadian former television journalist. A longtime reporter and anchor for CTV National News and CTV News Channel, he moved to Global News in 2011 before retiring from journalism in 2016. He also served as Canada's Consul General in New York.

== Personal ==
Clark was born in the early 1950s (1952 or 1953) to Joseph Adair Porter Clark and Patricia Grant, and raised in Toronto. He graduated from Upper Canada College in 1971. He is fluent in both English and French. Clark attended Carleton University to study journalism, but left for a news job in Montreal.

Clark comes from a family of journalists:

- great-grandfather Joseph Thomas Clark was managing editor of the Toronto Star and Saturday Night
- grandfather Joseph William Greig Clark (1896–1956) RAF aviator and reporter for the Toronto Star
- father Joseph Adair Porter Clark (1921–2013) was the founder, CEO and President of Canada NewsWire
- great-uncle Gregory Clark (1892–1977) was a writer and journalist with both the Toronto Star and the Toronto Telegram
- uncle James Murray Clark (son of Greg) was also a reporter with the Star (d. 1944)

Besides journalism, Clark is a licensed pilot and flies a floatplane.

== Career ==
Clark served as CTV's China Bureau Chief in the early 1980s. He was among the first to cover the Ethiopian famine in 1984, was in Berlin in 1989 to witness the fall of the wall, and was the only Canadian reporter in Yugoslavia when NATO launched aerial war against Serbia in 1999. In all, Clark has covered six theatres of war. He was the first Canadian journalist to ever interview U.S. President George W. Bush one on one on television. He also hosted, and served as senior correspondent on CTV's W-FIVE for eight years, and hosted the political news show Power Play on CTV News Channel.

On September 7, 2010, CTV announced Clark was leaving the network to pursue other opportunities. He had been considered one of the frontrunners to succeed Lloyd Robertson as CTV National News anchor; with his departure coming shortly after Lisa LaFlamme was named Robertson's successor, it was widely speculated that Clark's departure was tied to having been passed over. However, Clark later said that he was "neither angry nor bitter" about the choice of LaFlamme, and that CTV decided to buy out his contract.

On September 1, 2011, Clark was appointed chief political correspondent for Global Television Network. In this role he was the inaugural host of the network's Sunday morning political talk show The West Block.

Global News announced Clark would retire as of January 1, 2017, ending his 40-plus year career in journalism.

On January 9, 2017 Clark joined Global Public Affairs, Canada's largest privately owned public affairs firm, as its Chair of Public Affairs and Communications.

== Sources ==
- GlobalNews.ca biography
