= Don Martin (journalist) =

Canadian journalist

- Born: September 12, 1956 (age 69); Rochester, New York
- Occupations: journalist, TV host, writer
- Known for: Calgary Herald columnist, CTV News Channel
- Notable work: King Ralph: The Life and Political Success of Ralph Klein

Don Martin (born September 12, 1956) is a retired Canadian right-wing journalist, best known as a former Calgary Herald columnist, television pundit and television show host on CTV News Channel.

== Newspaper career ==
In 1978, Martin was hired by the Calgary Herald newspaper where he began a 22-year career as city hall bureau chief, 1988 Winter Olympics bureau chief and civic affairs columnist. In 1993, he was transferred to Edmonton as the newspaper’s provincial affairs columnist. In 2000, he relocated to Ottawa as the Calgary Herald’s national affairs columnist, syndicated opinion writer for the Southam newspaper chain and regular on-air contributor to CBC, CTV and CPAC political shows.

In 2008, Martin published a column criticizing the campaign of former journalist Arthur Kent for a seat in the Legislative Assembly of Alberta in the 2008 Alberta general election. The case spent eight years in the courts before the judge found in favour of Kent, awarding him $200,000 in damages, in 2016. Kent was awarded a further $200,000 in damages in 2018, after filing an appeal on the grounds that the initial award was not sufficient to compensate for the damage to his reputation.

== Television career ==
In 2010, CTV hired Martin to host the news channel’s flagship politics show Power Play. In 2012 he received the Public Policy Forum’s Peter Lougheed Award for Public Service in Western Canada. He retired as host of Power Play in December 2019, but continues to write a weekly blog for CTVNews.ca.

== Writing ==
Martin has written two biographies. His first, King Ralph: The Life and Political Success of Ralph Klein, was published in 2002 and became a national bestseller. His second book, Belinda: The Political and Private Life of Belinda Stronach, was published in 2006.
