= Public affairs (broadcasting) =

Element of public broadcasting

In broadcasting, public affairs radio or television programs focus on matters of politics and public policy. In the United States, among commercial broadcasters, such programs are often only to satisfy Federal Communications Commission (FCC) regulatory expectations and are not scheduled in prime time. Public affairs television programs are often broadcast at times when few listeners or viewers are tuned in (or even awake) in time slots known as graveyard slots; such programs can be frequently encountered at times such as 5-6 a.m. on a Sunday. Sunday morning talk shows are a notable exception to this obscure scheduling.

Harvard University claims that the public affairs genre has been losing popularity since the beginning of the digital era.

Broadcasters like National Public Radio (NPR) and Public Broadcasting Service (PBS) in the United States, the United Kingdom's British Broadcasting Corporation (BBC), and Canada's Canadian Broadcasting Corporation (CBC) often dedicate a majority of their programming to government policies and global events.

== See also ==
- Community journalism
- Local news
- News broadcasting
- Public broadcasting
- Public service announcement (PSA)
- Sunday morning talk show
