= Mike Duffy =

Canadian senator and journalist (born 1946)

The Honourable Mike Duffy
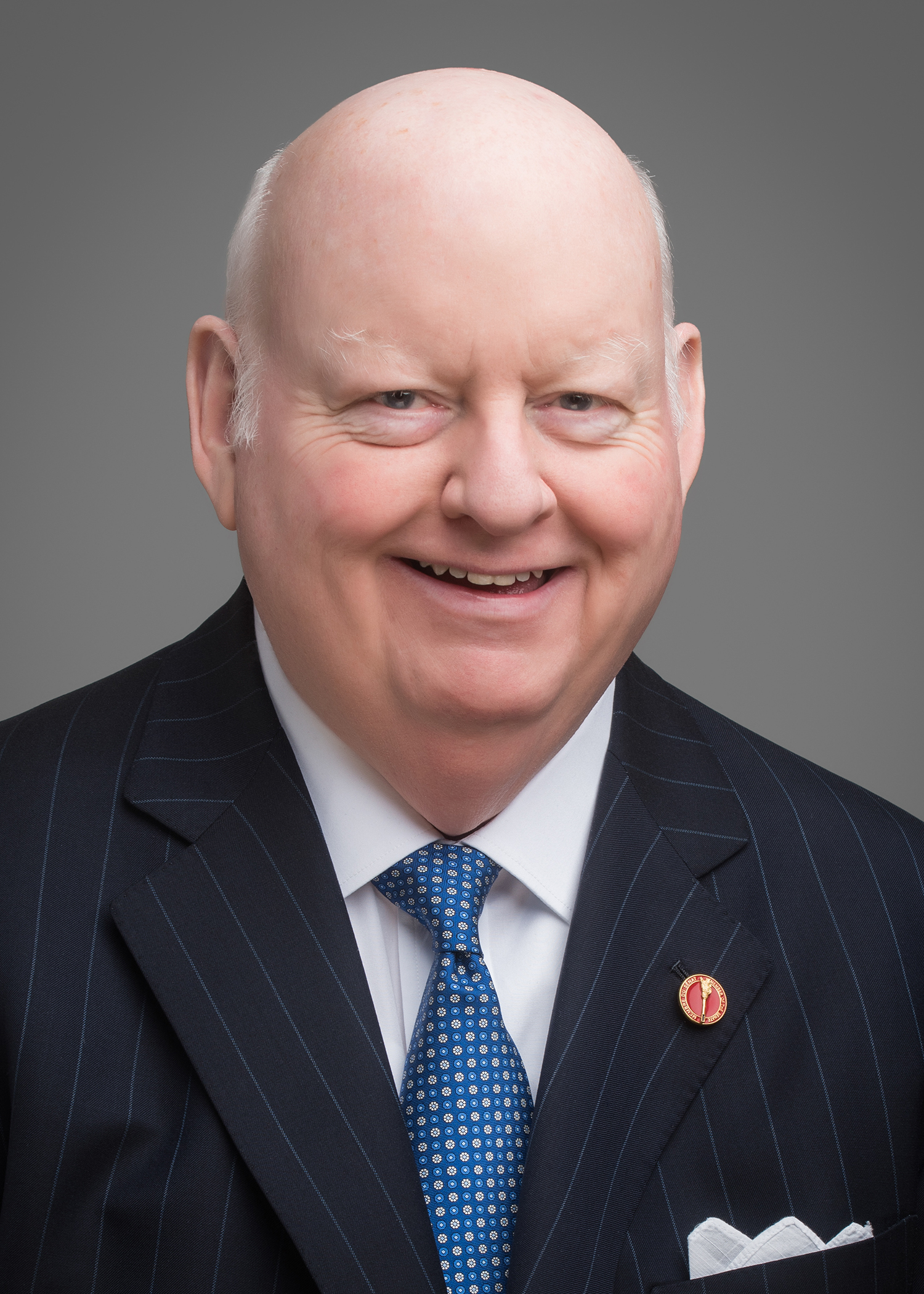

Canadian Senator from Prince Edward Island
- In office January 2, 2009 – May 27, 2021
- Nominated by: Stephen Harper
- Appointed by: Michaëlle Jean
- Succeeded by: Jane MacAdam

Personal details
- Born: Michael Dennis Duffy; May 27, 1946 (age 80) Charlottetown, Prince Edward Island, Canada
- Party: Independent Senators Group
- Other political affiliations: Non-affiliated (2013–2016); Conservative (2009–2013)
- Spouse(s): Nancy Duffy (divorced) Heather Duffy (m. 1992)
- Profession: Television journalist

Michael Dennis Duffy (born May 27, 1946) is a former Canadian senator and Canadian television journalist. Prior to his appointment to the upper house in 2008, he was the Ottawa editor for CTV News Channel. Upon turning 75 on May 27, 2021, Duffy retired from the Senate due to mandatory retirement rules.

== Early life ==
Mike Duffy was born May 27, 1946, in Charlottetown, Prince Edward Island to Lillian and Wilfrid Duffy. He is a grandson of Charles Gavan Duffy, a PEI Liberal MLA and Speaker of the Legislative Assembly of Prince Edward Island.

Duffy studied humanities at St. Dunstan's College.

== Journalism career ==
Duffy became a ham radio operator at the age of 16 and began his career as a teen disc jockey at CFCY-TV. He moved to print journalism by working with The Guardian in Charlottetown. In 1965, he served as news director at CKDH-FM in Amherst, Nova Scotia before heading to CFCF in Montreal as a lineup and assignment editor in 1969. In 1971, he joined CFRA radio in Ottawa as a political reporter.

Duffy joined CBC Radio's Parliament Hill bureau in 1974, and became a reporter for the flagship television newscast The National in 1977. He became the lead CBC television reporter on Parliament Hill and covered the elections and most of the important federal stories of the Trudeau, Clark and Mulroney governments. Primarily known for his work as an Ottawa journalist, he was considered a foreign correspondent. He covered the fall of South Vietnam in April 1975 and was one of the last journalists to leave before the arrival of North Vietnamese troops and Viet Cong insurgents.

In 1988, Duffy joined Baton Broadcasting as the first host of its Sunday morning news program Sunday Edition based in Ottawa. When that series ended in 1999, Duffy moved to his role as a show host and interviewer with CTV Newsnet (now the CTV News Channel). Long known as an "Ottawa insider", he was able to get many elected officials to appear on his programs. Duffy hosted two programs on CTV Newsnet, Countdown with Mike Duffy and Mike Duffy Live, which was broadcast in the supper hour news slot. Duffy was also a popular speaker at conferences, annual meetings and other events across Canada and, writer Stevie Cameron noted in her 1990 book Ottawa Inside Out, was probably the most recognized journalist on Parliament Hill.

On May 27, 2009, the Canadian Broadcast Standards Council ruled Duffy violated Canadian broadcasting codes during the 2008 Canadian federal election. It concluded that Duffy's decision to re-broadcast an earlier ATV Halifax broadcast of 'false starts' of an interview with then-Liberal leader Stephane Dion "was not fair, balanced, or even handed." The Panel also concluded that, during the same broadcast, Duffy "significantly misrepresented the view of one of the three members of his Panel...Liberal MP Geoff Regan." The panel thus concluded "that the consistent misrepresentation by host Mike Duffy of the MP's point of view constituted an unfair and improper presentation of opinion or comment contrary to clause 6 of the CAB Code of Ethics."

=== Awards and honours ===
In 1986, he won an ACTRA Award for live television reporting, for his coverage of the 1985 Turkish embassy attack in Ottawa by the Armenian Revolutionary Army. In 1994, Duffy was inducted into the Canadian Association of Broadcasters Hall of Fame.

Duffy has received honorary degrees from the University of Prince Edward Island, as well as from Wilfrid Laurier University and Niagara University in Niagara Falls, New York. He has been a visiting fellow at Duke University, in Durham, North Carolina, and has been twice nominated for the "best in the business" award by the Washington Journalism Review.

In 2002, he was awarded the Golden Jubilee Medal by the Governor General of Canada on behalf of Queen Elizabeth II.

== Political career ==
On December 22, 2008, Duffy was named a Prince Edward Island representative to the Senate on the advice of Prime Minister Stephen Harper, sitting as a Conservative. He subsequently retired as a TV journalist at the end of 2008. He was introduced to the Senate on January 26, 2009 immediately prior to the Speech from the Throne.

=== Expenses controversy ===
In 2012, Duffy was accused by the media and Senate of improperly claiming primary residency outside of Ottawa in order to claim living expenses for time working in Ottawa. Three other senators, with different fact cases, were also accused of filing false expenses. On February 28, 2013, the Senate Committee on the Internal Economy announced that Duffy, Pamela Wallin, Mac Harb, and Patrick Brazeau would be subject to a forensic audit to determine appropriateness of their expense claims. After several weeks of negative publicity, Duffy, despite believing he was entitled to claim the PEI residence, volunteered to pay back the expenses he had claimed for his Ottawa residence. Prime Minister Harper's Chief of Staff, Nigel Wright wrote a personal cheque to Duffy for $90,172 to cover past residency expenses claimed as part of an agreement Duffy made with the Prime Minister's Office. Duffy then repaid the Government of Canada $90,172 in March 2013. Duffy resigned from the Conservative caucus on May 16, 2013, and became an independent senator. On November 5, 2013, the Senate voted to suspend Duffy and two other senators. However, in his trial decision exonerating Duffy in 2016, Ontario Superior Court Judge Charles Vaillancourt said Duffy had not falsely claimed living expenses. The judge said Duffy had no choice in the matter, as he had been appointed to represent Prince Edward Island in the Senate.

==== Acquittal on criminal charges ====
On July 17, 2014, Duffy was charged by the Royal Canadian Mounted Police with 31 fraud-related offences. Duffy was acquitted of all charges on April 21, 2016. Ontario Superior Court Justice Charles Vaillancourt ruled: "Mr. Neubauer (the Crown prosecutor) stated that Senator Duffy's actions were driven by deceit, manipulations, and carried out in a clandestine manner representing a serious and marked standard expected of a person in Senator Duffy's position of trust. I find that if one were to substitute the PMO, Nigel Wright and others for Senator Duffy in the aforementioned sentence that you would have a more accurate statement." The judge ruled Duffy had no choice but to list his Prince Edward Island home as his principal residence, as he had been appointed a senator from that province and was constitutionally required to be resident there. Duffy's "free will" had been "overwhelmed" and he had "capitulated" as a result of the PMO's -- Prime Minister Stephen Harper's office, that is, -- "threatening efforts," the judge said. The Superior Court judge said Duffy had been pressured by senior members of the Prime Minister's staff to admit to improper expense accounts when they were, in fact, legitimate, adding "the real deceit came from Harper's office." Robert Fife, now the Globe and Mail's Ottawa bureau chief, won an award for his reporting on the so-called "Senate scandal." On the day Sen. Duffy was acquitted, Fife claimed he had been repeatedly misled by the Harper PMO. He went on to declare the scandal was a "manipulative hoax" by Nigel Wright foisted on the Canadian public. "From the beginning when I broke that story on the $90,000. The Prime Minister's Office every step of the way lied to me, they lied to Canadians. And inch by inch we were able to scale back and find out one lie after another, one lie after another. And then in the summertime when Nigel Wright and the other key lieutenants in the Prime Minister's Office were put on the stand, we saw just how this manipulative hoax was put on the Canadian public." Duffy immediately resumed his seat in the Senate and sat as an independent until his retirement.

==== Civil lawsuit ====
On August 24, 2017, Duffy filed a lawsuit against the Senate and the Royal Canadian Mounted Police seeking damages of CA$8 million. Duffy alleged the RCMP was liable for negligent investigation. He accused the Senate of abuse of process and breaching its duty to provide him with a fair hearing before suspending him. Duffy accused the Senate of acting under media pressure and adding to stress that took a heavy toll on his health.

In December 2018, the Ontario Superior Court dismissed Duffy's lawsuit against the Senate. The decision by Justice Sally Gomery included this statement: "Allowing a court to revisit the Senate's decisions at issue here would interfere with the Senate's ability to function as an independent legislative body, equal to other branches of government". Duffy's suit against the RCMP, based on alleged negligence in their investigation, was not affected by this decision.

In January 2019, Duffy filed an appeal to the Ontario Court of Appeal. His appeal was ultimately unsuccessful. In October 2020, Duffy filed an appeal to the Supreme Court of Canada, which was dismissed in February 2021.
