= Power Play (2009 TV program) =

Canadian television show

- Presented by: Vassy Kapelos (M-Th); Mike Le Couteur (F)
- Country of origin: Canada

Production
- Production locations: Ottawa, Ontario
- Running time: 60 minutes

Original release
- Network: CTV News Channel
- Release: February 2, 2009 – present

Power Play is a Canadian public affairs television program which airs weekdays on CTV News Channel. Interviews are conducted with important Canadian political figures as well as political journalists and strategists. The program broadcasts from Parliament Hill, and debuted on February 2, 2009.

Its original host was Tom Clark; upon his departure from the network in September 2010, it was hosted on a week-by-week basis by various Bell Media journalists, including Jane Taber and Roger Smith, until CTV announced that Don Martin, a newspaper columnist, would become the new host of Power Play starting in mid-December 2010. His retirement from the program was announced in November 2019, with the program to be taken over by Evan Solomon Mondays to Thursdays and Joyce Napier on Fridays. Solomon left the show in October 2022 for a publishing role in New York City; in November 2022, Vassy Kapelos was announced as his successor. Napier departed the program in June 2023 after she was announced as a casualty of a round of cuts to Bell Media news personnel; her successor as the Friday host was announced to be Todd van der Heyden. Van der Heyden would be replaced by Mike Le Couteur as Friday host.

Power Play is the permanent successor to Mike Duffy Live, which aired until December 2008 when Mike Duffy, the host, was appointed to the Senate of Canada. Following the departure of Duffy, a program called On the Hill, hosted by Graham Richardson, ran for one month until Power Play premiered.
