= Chief of Staff to the Prime Minister (Canada) =

Most senior political aide to the Canadian Prime Minister

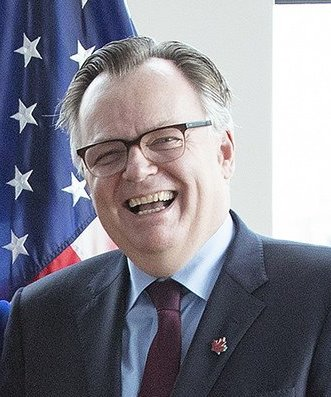
- Incumbent; Marc-André Blanchard since July 7, 2025
- Office of the Prime Minister
- Style: Chief of Staff to the Prime Minister of Canada
- Type: Political Advisor
- Reports to: Prime Minister
- Seat: Langevin Block
- Appointer: Prime Minister
- Formation: March 13, 1987
- First holder: Derek Burney
- Website: Prime Minister's Office

The chief of staff to the prime minister, sometimes referred to as the PMO Chief of Staff, is the most senior political advisor to the prime minister of Canada, the formal executive head of the political appointees employed in the Prime Minister's Office (PMO), and the leader of the broader group of politically appointed ministerial aide across the ministry in power (the exempted staff in federal government jargon). Marc-André Blanchard has been the Chief of Staff since July 2025.

The current title was formally instituted and conferred to the inaugural holder Derek Burney in March 1987, and has been in continual use since. In the two decades preceding 1987, the ranking political aide to the prime minister held the title principal secretary to the prime minister. The title remained in use as has been conferred from time to time to the second ranking advisor.

Principal Secretary to the Prime Minister of Canada
- Incumbent; Scott Gilmore since July 13, 2026
- Office of the Prime Minister
- Type: Political advisor
- Reports to: Prime Minister
- Seat: Langevin Block
- Appointer: Prime Minister
- Formation: July 1, 1867
- First holder: Hewitt Bernard
- Website: Prime Minister's Office

== Functions and authorities ==
The chief of staff is the executive head of the approximately 100 partisan appointees, or exempt staff employed by the PMO to support the Prime Minister in discharging their many overlapping roles and functions.

The chief of staff position is classified for salary and benefit purposes at the most senior executive level, with rate of pay comparable to deputy ministers. While PMO's remuneration and operational costs are incurred as part of the estimates of the Privy Council Office (PCO) and the two offices are functionally interdependent of each other, PMO is an autonomous unit distinct from the PCO. The chief of staff is accountable to the prime minister and is not subject to the management authority of PCO's departmental executive leader, the Clerk of the Privy Council, who is also the head of the entire federal civil service workforce.

The chief of staff exercises authority over not only PMO staff, but over all politically appointed ministerial staff across the federal government. These exempt staff, similar to SpAds in the United Kingdom, are not considered civil services. Their continual employment is subject to their political principals remaining in office and having confidence in them. PMO staff members and the ministerial chiefs of staff are accountable to the PMO chief of staff, who in turn is accountable directly to the prime minister.

As a trusted advisor with regular access to the prime minister, the informal authority and influence wielded by the chief of staff is exponentially larger than authority the formal function leading the few hundreds aides would confer. In recent decades with both Liberal and Conservative ministries, it is generally accepted (and a grievance by many parliamentarians) that the chief of staff's and their senior deputies' influence over public policy are comparable to those of the most senior members of cabinet.

== Broader use of the titles ==
The ranking political advisors who head the offices of cabinet ministers, of the Leader of the Official Opposition (OLO) and of most provincial premiers are also known as chief of staff. Some of those offices also confer their second ranking advisor the title of principal secretary. The specific roles of the chief of staff and the principal secretary, and their division of responsibilities and authorities vary and are heavily influenced by such persons' relationships with their political principals and the working styles of the political principals. This has sometimes led to ambiguity in defining the distinction between the roles of principal secretary and chief of staff to the general public.

== History of role ==
The development of the role of PMO chief of staff, and more generally of ministerial staff in Canada, was influenced by the political practice of two countries it shared the most political heritage, the United Kingdom and the United States. Political leaders have placed loyal supporters and partisans allies on public payroll to serve crucial gatekeeping functions probably for as long as there were governments. Identifying the cadre of partisan appointees as a special category and formally distinguishing them from career civil servants however are more recent phenomenon. The growing size of the political staff in Canada reflects a gradual shift from Whitehall practice in the United Kingdom (where private offices of ministers consist of mainly seconded career civil servants as private secretaries, along with a few temporary partisan appointees titled special advisors selected by 10 Downing Street; the rank of special advisor was not formally instituted until 1997, and remain fewer than 150 in number as of 2025) toward the political practice in the United States (where political appointees fill a wide range of roles at all level of seniority in government).

The development of the current role of PMO chief of staff can be broken into three eras.

=== As private secretaries, before 1960s ===
From confederation to the 1950s, there were no formal, fixed position for or title conferred to the most senior political aide to the prime minister. There were also little formal separation of partisan loyalist hired by a prime minister from career civil servants once they were employed inside the government, and many individuals traversed the two spheres, remained employed even after their principals were ousted. The lack of formal structure however did not prevent certain aide from being identified or broadly recognized as the primary partisan political aides or most trusted staff advisors to the prime minister.

Following British practices, such aides were usually titled private secretary, principle private secretary, or simply secretary to the prime minister, and were part of the civil service at a middle management rank. Their authority was relatively limited. Private secretaries' key functions in those days were around handling correspondence for their principal, maintaining the principal's diary, gatekeeping, to being the personal aide/body man. The role as political and strategic advisor were more incidental.

In both the UK and in Canada, as the civil service became more professionalized, a greater emphasis is placed on its member to be non-partisan. This naturally creates tension for private secretaries serving senior political leaders. The degree of "politicalness" of the senior private secretaries vacillated fairly widely for much of the first half of the 20th century. From the late 1910s to the 1930s, Arthur Merriam was a constant presence as a private secretary whenever the Conservatives were in power, serving three prime ministers in four different ministries over two decades. However, their rival Liberal Mackenzie King, a civil servant who reached senior ranks at a young page before entering politics, much preferred to be serviced by those with his background, top performing younger civil servants, with storied public servants like Arnold Heeney and Walter Turnbull having served as his principal private secretary before taking top rank civil service roles. Tension exists even within the same office. Jack Pickersgill, who started his career as an external affairs civil servant and went on to become Clerk of the Privy Council and then cabinet minister, grumbled about feeling constricted by the non-partisan emphasis when he was a junior private secretary under Heeney and Turnbull, and asked PM King to steer all matters deemed too partisan by other private secretaries to his direction.

=== Principal secretaries, 1968–1987 ===
From 1968 to 1987, the title principal secretary was formally and consistently used to denote an individual who was the prime minister's principal political advisor and formal head of the PMO staff.

Marc Lalonde, an associate of Pierre Trudeau in the early 1950s, was recruited to be Lester Pearson's policy advisor in 1967. He was credited for a significant roles in orchestrating Trudeau's bid for leadership, and was formally conferred the title Principal Secretary following Trudeau's victory at the 1968 leadership convention. A distinct staff of partisan aides was formalized during the early years of Trudeau's premiership, and PMO staff grew from a handful of aides to dozens of political operatives.

The rapid development of this staff was partially due to the unique circumstances brought by October Crisis, requiring Lalonde to build a larger team within PMO to handle operations that may not be tenable to have assigned to civil servants. Lalonde's role representing the prime minister to Quebec premier Robert Bourassa and Montreal mayor Jean Drapeau during the crisis also significantly solidified the chief aide's formal authority in speaking on behalf of the prime minister. At Trudeau's urging, Lalonde ran for and won a seat in the election following the crisis and immediately entered cabinet. The succession by Martin O'Connell, a cabinet minister defeated at the same election (who went on to regain his seat in parliament in 1974 and in cabinet 1978), as principal secretary further solidified the role's formal authority.

The title Chief of Staff emerged as the title of the prime minister's top aide when Joe Clark's top advisor Bill Neville, who had been using the title in the opposition leader's office, carried it over to PMO. The appearance was cut short due to the brief tenure of the Clark ministry.

=== Chiefs of Staff, since 1987 ===
The title chief of staff was formally instituted and supplanted principal secretary as the top ranking post in PMO in 1987 during Bernard Roy's tenure as Brian Mulroney's principal secretary. Roy, a personal confidant of Mulroney who had held the title since Mulroney's election in 1984, was seen as an ineffective administrator lacking strong political instinct, and was blamed for the precipitous drops of progressive conservative's Quebec polling numbers (from 50% in the 1984 election to 17% in 1987), a province Roy was responsible for. His background as one of Mulroney's closest friends was also inconvenient fodder when the opposition focused their attack on cronyism and sleaze. Mulroney, who famously extoled personal loyalty as a cherished virtue announced in March 1987 that Derek Burney, a career diplomat who was at the time an assistant under-secretary of state at the Department of External Affairs (comparable to a modern-day assistant deputy minister in Global Affairs Canada), would be seconded to PMO to be the Prime Minister's chief of staff, and Roy would retain his title but would relinquish administrative leadership of PMO to focus on or more political matters.

The appointment of a career civil servant with no personal ties to the prime minister also served to signal a renewed focus on professionalism. It drew parallels to US president Ronald Reagan's appointment of former senator Howard Baker as his chief of staff just a few weeks prior with the explicate mandate to address chaos that took hold of the White House during the Iran-Contra scandal.

== List of the Prime Minister's chief aides ==
No.	Name	Tenure		PM (Ministry)	Notes, elected/senior civil service posts held
Private secretaries
	Charles Drinkwater	1867	1873	Macdonald (1^{st})	Was private secretary to Macdonald as early as 1864 (Note: Attended the Charlottetown Conference as private secretary to the Attorney General of Canada West, the role held by Macdonald at the time.) and remained private secretary at the end of his first premiership (Note: Some sources suggested Hewitt Bernard, Macdonald's brother-in-law, was his private secretary during the first Macdonald minister (1867-73). That is likely a conflation of Bernard's earlier service as his private secretary (1858-64) while he was Premier of the Province of Canada and his role at this time as deputy minister to Macdonald in his role as justice minister (1867-76).)
	William Buckingham	1873	1878	Mackenzie (2^{nd})	(Note: Identified as such while in office) (Note: Identified himself as such as PM Mackenzie's co-biographer with George William Ross)
	Fred White	1878	1882	Macdonald (3^{rd})	Later: Commissioner of the Northwest Territories (1905-18)
	Sir Joseph Pope (Note: Entitlement to honorific/title attained later, after service as PM's aide)	1882	1891	Macdonald (3^{rd})	Concurrent: assistant Clerk of the Privy Council 1889-96; Later: Under-Secretary of State for Canada 1896-1909; for external affairs 1909-25; knighted 1912 (KCMG)
	Unknown			Abbott (4^{th})	
	Douglas Stewart	1892	1894	Thompson (5^{th})	As secretary
	Unknown			Bowell (6^{th})	
	Austin Ernest Blount	1896	1896	Tupper (7^{th})	Continually 1896 to 1917 as private secretary to Conservative leaders Tupper (Note: Initially as private secretary to Tupper as Secretary of State for Canada) and then Borden inclusive of time in opposition.
	Ernest Joseph Lemaire	1904	1912	Laurier (8^{th})	
	Austin Ernest Blount (2nd)	1911	1917	Borden (9^{th} & 10^{th})	Later: Clerk of the Senate & of the Parliaments 1917-38; CMG 1918
	Unknown			Borden (9^{th} & 10^{th})	
	Arthur Merriam	1920	1921	Meighan (11^{th})	
	Laurent Beaudry & Fred A. McGregor	1921	1922	King (12^{th})	respectively as Private Secretary and Secretary
	Leslie Clare Moyer	1923	1926	King (12^{th})	
	Hon. Ralph Campney	1925	1926	King (12^{th})	as political secretary Later: MP for Vancouver Centre 1949-57; Solicitor General 1952-54, defence minister 1954-57
	Arthur Merriam (2nd)	1926	1926	Meighan (13^{th})	
	Howard Measures	1925	1930	King (14^{th})	as Personal Secretary
	Leslie Clare Moyer	1926	1927	King (14^{th})	
	Harry Baldwin	1929	1930	King (14^{th})	as Principal Private Secretary
	Arthur Merriam (3rd)	1930	1935	Bennett (15^{th})	referred to as chief secretary in some instances
	Howard R. L. Henry	1935	1935	King (16^{th})	
	Unknown			King (16^{th})	
	Arnold Heeney	1938	1940	King (16^{th})	as Principal Private Secretary; Later: Clerk of the Privy Council 1940-49; Under Secretary for External Affairs 1949-52; Ambassador to NATO 1952-53, United States 1953-57, 59-62; CC 1968
	Walter J. Turnbull	1940	1945	King (16^{th})	as Principal Private Secretary; Later: Deputy Postmaster General 1945-57
	Rt. Hon. Jack Pickersgill	1945	1952	King (16^{th})	as Special Assistant to the Prime Minister (Note: Gideon Matte, campaign manager for King's Prince Albert constituency, was delegated the clerical duties and held the title private secretary.); Promoted from: assistant private secretary Later: Clerk of the Privy Council 1952-53; MP for Bonavista—Twillingate 1953-67; cabinet minister (Sec of State for Canada 1953-54, 63-64; immigration 1954-57; gov't house leader 1963; transport 1964-67); CC 1970
	Rt. Hon. Jack Pickersgill	1945	1952	St-Laurent (17^{th})	as Special Assistant to the Prime Minister; Promoted from: assistant private secretary Later: Clerk of the Privy Council 1952-53; MP for Bonavista—Twillingate 1953-67; cabinet minister (Sec of State for Canada 1953-54, 63-64; immigration 1954-57; gov't house leader 1963; transport 1964-67); CC 1970
	Dale C. Thomson	1952	1953	St-Laurent (17^{th})	as Principal Secretary
	Pierre Asselin	1952	1957	St-Laurent (17^{th})	
	Derek Bedson	1957	1958	Diefenbaker (18^{th})	
	Gowan T. Guest	1958	1960	Diefenbaker (18^{th})	Initially as private secretary, from October 1959 as Executive Assistant (Note: From 1957 to late 1959, top official in Diefenbaker's PMO was the private secretary. In October 1959, incumbent P.S. Guest initiated an reorganization of the PMO, during which he delegated secretarial functions to Michael J. Deacey, who assumed the title private secretary. Guest remained the senior aide and assumed the title executive assistant.)
	Neil S. Crawford	1961	1963	Diefenbaker (18^{th})	as Executive Assistant
	John (Jack) Syner Hodgson	1966	1967	Pearson (19^{th})	as Principal Private Secretary
	Hon. Marc Lalonde	1967	1968	Pearson (19^{th})	as policy secretary
Principal secretaries
1	Hon. Marc Lalonde	1968	1972	Trudeau (20^{th})	Promoted from: policy advisor to PM Pearson; Later: MP for Outremont 1972-84; cabinet minister 1972-79, 80-84 (included finance, justice, health, energy); OC 1989
2	Hon. Martin O'Connell	1973	1974	Trudeau (20^{th})	Prior & later: MP for Scarborough East 1968-72, 74-79 and labour minister 1971-72, 78-79
3	Hon. Jack Austin	1974	1975	Trudeau (20^{th})	Later: Senator for Vancouver South, BC 1975-2007, minister of state 1981-84; Government Leader in Senate 2003-06
4	Jim Coutts	1975	1979	Trudeau (20^{th})	Continued: remained principal secretary through period of Trudeau as opposition leader
5	Bill Neville	1979	1980	Clark (21^{st})	Continued: same role as Chief of Staff to Clark as opposition leader (1976-79, 80-81) both in government and in opposition; E.A. (Note: Chiefs of staff to ministers were titled Executive Assistants until 1990s.) to Liberal Ministers Judy LaMarsh and Edgar Benson (1965-69)
(4)	Jim Coutts (2nd)	1980	1981	Trudeau (22^{nd})	Left office to seek parliamentary seat in byelection (unsuccessful)
6	Tom Axworthy	1981	1984	Trudeau (22^{nd})	
7	John Swift	1984	1984	Turner (23^{rd})	Prior & continued: E.A. to Turner while finance minister, continued in role while Turner was opposition leader
8	Bernard A. Roy	1984	1987	Mulroney (24^{th})	Continued: remain principal secretary until 1988
Chiefs of staff
9	Derek Burney	1987	1989	Mulroney (24^{th})	Prior: Ambassador to Korea 1978-80; Later: Ambassador to the United States 1989-93
10	Stanley Hartt	1989	1990	Mulroney (24^{th})	Prior: Deputy Minister of Finance 1985-88; Later: OC 1994
11	Norman Spector	1990	1992	Mulroney (24^{th})	Prior: deputy minister to BC Premier Bill Bennett 1982-86 (SoCred), secretary to the cabinet for Federal-Provincial Relations 1986-90; Later: Ambassador to Israel 1992-95, Rep to Palestinian Authority 1992-94; President of the Atlantic Canada Opportunities Agency 1995-96
12	Hon. Hugh Segal	1992	1993	Mulroney (24^{th})	Prior: Chief of staff to Ontario premier Bill Davis; Later: 1998 PC leadership contestant; Senator for Kingston—Frontenac—Leeds, Ontario 2005-14
13	David McLaughlin	1993	1993	Mulroney (24^{th})	Later: Chief of staff to NB Premier Bernard Lord 1999-2003
14	Jodi White	1993	1993	Campbell (25^{th})	First female office holder
15	Jean Pelletier	1993	2001	Chrétien (26^{th})	Continued: same role while Chrétien was opposition leader (1991-93); Prior: Mayor of Quebec City 1977-89
16	Hon. Percy Downe	2001	2003	Chrétien (26^{th})	Promoted from: public appointments director 1998-2001; Later: Senator for PEI 2003-present
17	Eddie Goldenberg	2003	2003	Chrétien (26^{th})	Promoted from: chief policy advisor 1993-2003
18	Tim Murphy	2003	2006	Martin (27^{th})	Prior: same role while Martin was finance minister 2001-02, Ontario MPP for St. George—St. David 1993-95
19	Ian Brodie	2006	2008	Harper (28^{th})	Continued: same role while Harper was opposition leader 2003-04, 05-06
20	Guy Giorno	2008	2010	Harper (28^{th})	Prior: Chief of staff to Ontario Premier Mike Harris 2000-02
21	Nigel S. Wright	2010	2013	Harper (28^{th})	
22	Ray Novak	2013	2015	Harper (28^{th})	Promoted from: principal secretary (2008-13)
23	Katie Telford	2015	2025	J. Trudeau (29^{th})	Longest tenure chief aide in Canadian history
24	Hon. Marco Mendicino	2025	2025	M. Carney (30^{th})	Interim, assumed role while MP; Prior: MP for Eglinton—Lawrence 2015-25, cabinet minister (immigration 2019-21, public safety 2021-23)
25	Marc-André Blanchard	2025	Incumbent	M. Carney (30^{th})	Prior: Ambassador to the United Nations 2016-20

== Principal secretaries ==
Since 1987, the principal secretary title remained in use intermittently, and usually by a trusted personal confidant of the sitting prime minister with seniority comparable to or just below the chief of staff's. Prime Minister Jean Chretien did not name a principal secretary during his decade-long premiership. Prime ministers Stephen Harper appointed close associate Ray Novak (who famously lived rent-free above the garage at Stornoway when Harper was leader of the opposition) to the role, and left the role vacant after Novak was promoted to the top job. Similarly, Justin Trudeau named no replacement in the six years following the departure of principal secretary Gerald Butts, a close confidant since their university days. Prime minister Mark Carney reestablished the role, and created the position of chief operating officer of the PMO.

Depending on the personal approach and preferences of the prime minister, the duties of managing, administrating and co-ordinating the activities of the PMO may belong to the principal secretary, the chief of staff, or another key advisor. The Government of Canada does not maintain official public records of those who held leadership positions in the PMO. The Parliament's official website has a non-exhaustive list of "Leadership of the Prime Minister's Office", with likely no defined criteria for inclusion (as evident by the inclusion of a large numbers of "senior advisors" in Justin Trudeau's PMO while omitting the two deputy chief of staff who ranked above them).

=== List of principal secretaries and other aides ===
Name	Title	Tenure		PM (Ministry)	Notes, elected/senior civil service posts held
Bernard A. Roy	Principal Secretary	1984	1988	Mulroney (24th)	Prior: Head of PMO staff prior to 1987, continued in role after but relinquished the formal leadership of PMO staff
Lee Richardson	Deputy Chief of Staff	1984	1988	Mulroney (24th)	Prior: chief of staff to Alberta Premier Peter Lougheed; Later: MP for Calgary Southeast 1988-93 & Calgary Centre 2004-12; principal secretary to Alberta Premier Alison Redford 2012-14
Camille Guilbault	Deputy Chief of Staff			Mulroney (24th)	
Peter G. White	Principal Secretary	1988	1989	Mulroney (24th)	
Luc Lavoie	Deputy Chief of Staff	1988	1991	Mulroney (24th)	
Hon. Marjory LeBreton (Note: Entitlement to honorific attained later, after service as PM's aide)	Deputy Chief of Staff	1988	1993	Mulroney (24th)	Later: Senator for Ontario 1993-2015, Government Senate Leader 2006-13
Jean Riou	Principal Secretary	1993	1993	Campbell (25th)	
no designated deputy (Note: Eddie Goldenberg (chief policy advisor 1993-2002, chief of staff 2003) generally viewed as most influential aide even before formally made chief of staff due to working history.)				Chrétien (26th)	
Hon. Francis Fox	Principal Secretary	2003	2004	Martin (27th)	Prior: Former MP for Blainville—Deux-Montagnes 1972–84 and cabinet minister 1976–78, 80–84; Later: Senator for Victoria, Quebec 2005-11
Michele Cadario	Deputy Chief of Staff	2003	2006	Martin (27th)	
Mario Laguë	Deputy Chief of Staff	2003	2004	Martin (27th)	
Hon. Hélène Scherrer	Principal Secretary	2004	2006	Martin (27th)	Prior: MP Louis-Hébert 2000–04; heritage minister 2003-04
Karl Littler	Deputy Chief of Staff	2004	2006	Martin (27th)	
Peter Nicholson	Deputy Chief of Staff	2004	2006	Martin (27th)	
Keith Beardsley	Deputy Chief of Staff	2006	2008	Harper (28th)	
Ray Novak	Principal Secretary	2008	2013	Harper (28th)	Later: Promoted to Chief of Staff in 2013
Darrel Reid	Deputy Chief of Staff	2009	2010	Harper (28th)	
Derek Vanstone	Deputy Chief of Staff	2010	2012	Harper (28th)	
Joanne McNamara	Deputy Chief of Staff	2012	2014	Harper (28th)	
Jenni Byrne	Deputy Chief of Staff	2013	2015	Harper (28th)	
Howard Anglin	Deputy Chief of Staff	2014	2015	Harper (28th)	
Gerald Butts	Principal Secretary	2015	2019	J. Trudeau (29th)	
Jeremy Broadhurst	Deputy Chief of Staff	2015	2017	J. Trudeau (29th)	
Brian Clow	Deputy Chief of Staff	2021	2025	J. Trudeau (29th)	
Hon. Majorie Michel	Deputy Chief of Staff	2021	2025	J. Trudeau (29th)	Later: MP for Papineau since 2025; health minister since 2025
Hon. David Lametti	Principal Secretary	2025	2025	Carney (30th)	Prior: MP for LaSalle—Émard—Verdun 2015–24; justice minister 2019–23; Later: Ambassador to the United Nations since 2025
Hon. Tom Pitfield	Principal Secretary	2025	2026	Carney (30th)	Son of former Clerk of the Privy Council and Senator Michael Pitfield; spouse of MP/secretary of state Anna Gainey (Note: Initially an interim appointment, he has remained in the role during and after Lametti's tenure.); Later: left role upon appointment to Senate in 2026
Braeden Caley	Deputy Chief of Staff	2025	2026	Carney (30th)	later: Elected MP for North Vancouver—Capilano in 2026
Andrée-Lyne Hallé	Deputy Chief of Staff	2025	incumbent	Carney (30th)	
Tim Krupa	Deputy Chief of Staff	2026	incumbent	Carney (30th)	
Jennifer McIntyre	Deputy Chief of Staff	2026	incumbent	Carney (30th)	
Scott Gilmore	Principal Secretary	2026	incumbent	Carney (30th)	Former spouse of Trudeau Jr. ministry minister Catherine McKenna
Maia Johnson	Chief Operating Officer	2026	incumbent	Carney (30th)	

== See also ==
- Canadian Secretary to the King
- Secretary to the Governor General of Canada
