= Jenni Byrne =

Canadian political consultant

Principal Secretary to the Premier of Ontario
- In office June 2018 – January 2019
- Premier: Doug Ford
- Succeeded by: Amin Massoudi

Co–Deputy Chief of Staff, Prime Minister's Office
- In office August 2013 – November 4, 2015 Serving with Joanne McNamara
- Prime Minister: Stephen Harper
- Preceded by: Ray Novak
- Succeeded by: Katie Telford

Director of Political Operations, Conservative Party of Canada
- In office 2009 – August 2013
- Prime Minister: Stephen Harper
- Preceded by: Doug Finley
- Succeeded by: Fred DeLorey

Personal details
- Born: 1977 (age 48–49) Fenelon Falls, Ontario, Canada
- Party: Conservative (federal)
- Other political affiliations: Progressive Conservative (provincial)
- Profession: Political advisor

Jenni Byrne (born 1977) is a political advisor, political commentator, and lobbyist. She is currently advisor to federal Conservative leader Pierre Poilievre and operates her own consulting firm, Jenni Byrne + Associates. A member of the Conservative Party of Canada and the Progressive Conservative Party of Ontario, she is a former advisor to Prime Minister Stephen Harper and former Principal Secretary to Doug Ford.

== Early life ==
Byrne was born to Jerry and Julie Byrne in 1976 in Fenelon Falls, Ontario. Her mother was a teacher, who died in 2010 at the age of 58. Her father is a carpenter who joined the Reform Party in the 1990s to protest the long-gun registry enacted as part of the Firearms Act, introduced by the Liberal government of Prime Minister Jean Chrétien.

Byrne was a nursing student at Georgian College but did not graduate. She later attended the University of Ottawa, where she organized campus clubs for the Reform Party of Canada and did not graduate.

== Political career ==
Byrne became involved in politics at age 16 when she joined the Reform Party. Byrne's father, Jerry, had joined the same party to protest the Liberals' long-gun registry. She eventually became the President of the student Reform Party Club at the University of Ottawa. In a media interview, Byrne cited her concerns over debt reduction and tax cuts and how they were more important to her generation than to her parents' generation: "It's great for them to say don't cut here or there, but they won't be the ones affected by (the debt). They're in their late 40s and they will probably still benefit from government programs. But Canada looks like a bleak place for me by the time I'm their age."

Once referred to as "the most powerful woman in Ottawa," Byrne has been called Prime Minister Harper's "single best political organizer", a dedicated Harper loyalist who believed in the party during its darkest days. She is also known for her tenacity and possesses "a single-minded unwillingness to put up with people screwing around."

=== Stephen Harper's Conservative Party ===
In 2009, she became the Director of Political Operations for the Conservative Party of Canada following the appointment of Doug Finley to the Senate of Canada.

Byrne was the deputy national campaign manager in the 2006, 2008, and 2011 federal elections, serving under Doug Finley. Between elections, Byrne served in several roles in the Prime Minister's Office, including advisor to Chief of Staff Ian Brodie and Director of Issues Management, and at the headquarters of the Conservative Party of Canada.

In the 2011 campaign she was promoted to national campaign manager due to the ill health of Doug Finley. She served as campaign manager of the machine designed and largely still run by Finley, taking the pressure off him to allow his pursuit of cancer treatment. Byrne's responsibilities were overseeing the day-to-day operations of Finley's campaign, what The Hill Times called "one [of] the most efficient, richest, and iron-disciplined campaign machines in Canadian political history."

In August 2013, Byrne left her job as the Conservative Director of Political Operations and returned to the Prime Minister's Office as co-Deputy Chief of Staff.

==== Campaign manager for 2015 election ====
In October 2014 the Conservative Party announced that Byrne would lead the campaign in the 2015 Canadian federal election. Shortly before the election, Byrne was reported to have left the Conservative Party's campaign office in Ottawa and returned to Calgary. The Conservative government lost power to the Liberals, who won a majority of the seats. After the election, a number of Conservatives blamed Byrne for her role in the party's defeat and criticized her management style. Byrne's contract expired after the election. After the election, she joined Bayfield Strategy as vice-president of strategic communications.

=== Doug Ford's Progressive Conservative Party ===
Following Doug Ford's election as leader of the Ontario PC Party in March 2018, Byrne took over as Director of Field Operations for the 2018 provincial election. After the election, Byrne was selected to be Ford's first Principal Secretary. In January 2019 she left the Premier's office to accept an appointment to the Ontario Energy Board. In February 2020 she launched Jenni Byrne + Associates, a government relations firm based in Toronto.

=== Pierre Poilievre's Conservative Party ===
As Pierre Poilievre took leadership of the Conservative Party of Canada in the 2022 Conservative Party of Canada leadership election, Byrne returned to the CPC to work for Poilievre. While her specific role in the CPC is simply that of an advisor, political commentators generally describe Byrne as Poilievre's right hand and chief strategist.

Her role in Poilievre's campaign has created controversy because her consulting firm "Jenni Byrne + Associates" has multiple lobbyists registered on behalf of Loblaws. Loblaw Companies Limited has been central in discussions about the inflation surge in Canada, including testifying in the Parliament of Canada on the matter.

Byrne served as the CPC's campaign manager for the 2025 Canadian federal election; the party was defeated by the Liberal Party of Canada. Following criticism of her role in the campaign, Byrne announced that she would not serve in that role in the next election but would continue as an advisor to Poilievre. Prominent conservatives Doug Ford, Tim Houston, and Kory Teneycke, have been particularly critical of the campaign.

== Media ==
Byrne is a frequent political commentator. She was a regular member of David Herle's podcast, The Herle Burly and when the show was split into two separate programs she moved to Herle's commentary-only podcast Curse of Politics. She is currently on hiatus from her role on the show in order to focus on her role supporting Pierre Poilievre at the Conservative Party of Canada.

== Personal life ==
Byrne is not married and does not have children. She was previously involved in a romantic relationship with Conservative MP Pierre Poilievre, whose campaign for leader of the Conservative Party of Canada she helped manage. Her sister, Jerra Kosick (nee Byrne), is also involved with the Conservative Party of Canada, most recently serving as the chief of staff to Michelle Rempel. She is personal friends with Kory Teneycke and Ray Novak, all of whom were close advisors to Prime Minister Stephen Harper. The three met while working for the Reform Party of Canada during the 1997 Canadian federal election.
