= Canadian Senate expenses scandal =

Political scandal related to expenses of Canadian senators starting in late 2012

The Canadian Senate expenses scandal, also known as Duffygate, was a political scandal concerning the expense claims of certain Canadian senators which began in late 2012. Senators Patrick Brazeau, Mike Duffy, Mac Harb, and Pamela Wallin claimed travel and living allowance expenses from the Senate for which they were allegedly not eligible. Deloitte LLP was retained to provide the Senate with an independent examination of the expense claims. Duffy, Harb, and Wallin repaid ineligible amounts. Harb retired a few months into the scandal, and in November 2013, Brazeau, Duffy, and Wallin were suspended from the Senate without pay. Brazeau, Duffy, and Harb were criminally charged. On April 21, 2016, Duffy was acquitted on all charges. Charges against Harb were withdrawn and no charges were to be laid against Wallin. The scandal attracted much public attention, with as many as 73% of Canadians following it closely. Many said that the scandal impacted the 2015 Canadian general election.

Another result of the scandal was that the Auditor General of Canada examined the expense claims made by all the other 116 senators and former senators over a two-year period. In a June 2015 report, the Auditor General identified thirty senators whose claims were inappropriate, and of these, recommended that nine cases be referred for police investigation. Fourteen of these senators opted for binding arbitration by former Supreme Court of Canada Justice Ian Binnie, and his report was issued on March 21, 2016.

== Overview ==
The investigation of senator expenses began in November 2012 with the living expense claims of Patrick Brazeau and the travel expense claims of Pamela Wallin. By December 6, 2012, the Senate investigation was expanded to include the living expenses of Mac Harb. On January 3, 2013, the Senate formally retained Deloitte LLP to review the claims of Brazeau, Harb and Wallin. In February 2013, the Deloitte retainer was expanded to include Mike Duffy's living expense claims.

In March 2013, and before the Deloitte audit was complete, Duffy repaid $90,172 for the living expenses he had claimed. It was later learned in May 2013 through the media that the source of this money was a personal cheque provided by Nigel Wright, who was then Chief of Staff in the Prime Minister's Office.

On May 9, 2013, the Senate released reports about the expenses of Brazeau, Duffy and Harb, along with Deloitte's reports. It acknowledged Deloitte's finding that the criteria for determining a senator's primary residence were lacking. However, the intent and purpose of Senate policies for reimbursement of living expenses were "amply clear" and so Brazeau and Harb were ordered to repay living expenses. On August 13, 2013, the Senate released Deloitte's report on the expenses of Wallin and she was ordered to repay travel expenses. As of July 25, 2013, Harb still maintained his innocence.

It emerged that the Conservative-dominated Senate committee had drafted the May 9 report on Duffy's living expenses to reflect less poorly on Duffy, who was at that time a member of the Conservative caucus. After two weeks of controversy, and amid concerns that Duffy was claiming travel expenses from both the Senate and the Conservative Party, the Senate reopened Duffy's audit. On May 29, 2013, the Senate issued a report amending the May 9 one, and recommending that Duffy's case be referred to "the proper authorities."

In the months following, many of Canada's political parties reiterated their positions that the Senate should be reformed or abolished. On February 1, 2013, the Harper government sought clarification from the Supreme Court of Canada on the federal government's legislative power to reform or abolish the Senate. On April 25, 2014, the court ruled that this could not be done through federal legislation, but rather required constitutional amendment. To reform the Senate, the consent of at least seven provinces, which collectively have half of Canada's population, is required. Abolishment requires the consent of all ten provinces. The provinces' premiers, however, do not consider either a high priority. The Quebec Court of Appeal has re-iterated the role of the provinces in any decision.

A June 2013 poll revealed that in the wake of the controversy, 49% of Canadians wanted to reform the Senate, 41% wanted to see it abolished, 6% wanted to keep it as it was, and 4% were unsure.

On May 12, 2013, the Royal Canadian Mounted Police announced they were reviewing the expense claims. The RCMP had started their investigation in March 2013 when media reports were published regarding Deloitte's external review of the expenses of Brazeau, Duffy and Harb.

On August 14, 2013, it was announced that the Auditor General of Canada would be reviewing the expense claims of all senators.

In June 2015, the report was released by Auditor General Michael Ferguson. The Auditor General recommended that the cases of nine senators, including incumbent senators Pierre-Hughes Boisvenu and Colin Kenny, be referred for RCMP investigation, while 21 other senators were flagged for filing inappropriate expense claims including Senate Speaker Leo Housakos, Senate Government Leader Claude Carignan and Opposition Leader James Cowan. The Report indicated that nearly $1 million worth of inappropriate expenses were filed by the 30 senators.

The senators identified in the Auditor General's report had the option to submit to binding arbitration by former Supreme Court of Canada Justice Binnie. Fourteen of the 30 senators opted for arbitration, and the arbitrator's report was issued on March 21, 2016. Of the total amount referred to arbitration, Binnie ruled that about 55% was owing to the Senate. In his report, he said that "I impute no bad motives to any of the senators."

== Patrick Brazeau ==
=== Senate investigation ===
The Senate's investigation into the accuracy of Brazeau's declaration that his primary residence was in Maniwaki, Quebec began as a result of media reports.

On November 20, 2012, a CTV reporter interviewed residents of Maniwaki, who said that Brazeau did not live there. The next day, the Senate Government Leader announced that a subcommittee would investigate whether Brazeau was in compliance with Senate rules. The review period was April 2011, when Brazeau began to claim living expenses, to September 30, 2012, the last date for which full records were available.

The subcommittee's investigation "raised a number of questions", and so on December 11, 2012, it met with Brazeau and his lawyer. After this meeting, Deloitte was retained for external review.

Deloitte was not able to assess the status of Brazeau's declaration that his primary residence was in Maniwaki because the Senate regulations and guidelines did not contain a definition of primary residence. Deloitte was, however, able to confirm Brazeau's location for almost the entire review period. He was in Maniwaki about 10%, and in Ottawa about 81% of the time. He met all four "indicators" of primary residency (driver's licence, provincial health card, provincial tax return and voting location).

=== Repayment ===
Based on the finding that only 10% of Brazeau's time was in Maniwaki, the Senate ruled that his "level of presence" did not support his primary residence declaration. Brazeau was ordered to repay a total of $48,745.

On July 3, 2013, the Senate announced it would reduce Brazeau's salary by 20% to obtain repayment. It would have taken about 21 months to recoup all that was owing; however, this was interrupted by the suspension without pay in November 2013. With the parliamentary session ending when the federal election was called, it is expected that Brazeau will begin receiving his salary again, so further amounts may be recovered through the 20% reduction.

=== Expulsion from caucus ===
Brazeau was expelled from the Conservative caucus on February 7, 2013, over sexual assault allegations.

=== Criminal charges ===
On February 4, 2014, the RCMP announced that Brazeau was charged in relation to his living expenses with one count of fraud under s. 380 of the Criminal Code and one of breach of trust by a public officer under s. 122. The trial will be scheduled for 2017.

On July 13, 2016, Crown Prosecutors withdrew the criminal charges against Brazeau, citing "no reasonable prospect of conviction".

== Mac Harb ==
=== Senate investigation ===
Due to media reports regarding Harb's living expenses, the Senate began its investigation on December 6, 2012. The period of review was April 2011 to September 30, 2012, in keeping with the concurrent review of Brazeau's expenses, which had been underway since November 22, 2012. The Senate chose not to conduct an internal review of Harb's expenses due to "experience in conducting one claims review internally", and so Deloitte was retained on January 3, 2013.

Harb's declarations of primary residence were Cobden and later Westmeath, Ontario. Deloitte was not able to assess the status of these declarations because the Senate regulations and guidelines did not contain criteria for determining primary residence. Deloitte was able to confirm that Harb spent about 62% of his time in Ottawa and about 21% at the primary residence location. He did not meet three of the four "indicators" of primary residence (driver's licence, provincial health card and provincial tax return) and did not provide sufficient information as to voting location.

=== Repayment ===
Based on the finding that only 21% of Harb's time was spent at Westmeath, his "level of presence" did not support his primary residence declaration, and the Senate ordered that he repay expenses from April 2011 to date of $51,482, and that an internal investigation take place for the period prior to April 2011. Harb repaid this amount under protest and commenced action for judicial review of the Senate order. On August 26, 2013, he announced that he had repaid a further amount of $180,166 and was dropping the judicial review application. The total repaid inclusive of interest was $231,649 for living expenses dating back to 2005.

=== Retirement from Senate ===
Along with the announcement of repayment back to 2005, Harb announced his retirement from the Senate. Because he had been an MP for Ottawa for 15 years prior to his Senate appointment, he was eligible for a fully indexed parliamentary pension of $122,989 per year.

=== Criminal charges ===
On February 4, 2014, the RCMP announced that Harb was charged in relation to his living expenses with one count of fraud under s. 380 of the Criminal Code and one count of breach of trust by a public officer under s. 122.

Harb was scheduled go to court on August 10, 2015 His trial was postponed into 2016 because the Duffy trial was taking longer than expected. A month after Duffy was found not guilty, the charges against Harb were dropped because the Crown did not see a reasonable prospect of conviction.

== Mike Duffy ==
=== Senate investigation ===
Senate Administration was asked to provide a report of Duffy's travel patterns between PEI and Ottawa. Because this travel summary "raised concerns", on February 14, 2013, the Senate expanded Deloitte's review of expense claims to include Duffy's living expenses.

Deloitte was not able to assess the status of Duffy's declaration of primary residence in Cavendish, PEI because the Senate regulations and guidelines did not include criteria for determining a senator's primary residence. Deloitte was, however, able to confirm that Duffy spent about 54% of his time in Ottawa and about 30% in PEI. Of the four "indicators" of primary residence, he met one (driver's licence), did not meet two (provincial health card and provincial tax return), and did not provide sufficient information as to voting location.

On March 26, 2013, Deloitte received a letter from Duffy's counsel stating that, as Duffy had repaid the living expenses under review, there was no further need for Duffy's participation in the Deloitte audit. The audit was completed without further documentation or meeting with Duffy.

=== Repayment using funds from Nigel Wright ===
On February 22, 2013, Duffy wrote to the Chair of the Senate Standing Committee saying that he "may have been mistaken" when filling out the Senate forms, that he wanted to "repay the housing allowance" and requesting the amount of this. On February 27, 2013, Duffy was advised that the amount owing inclusive of interest was $90,172. Repayment was made by cheque dated March 25, 2013, drawn on Duffy's account. On April 19, 2013, Duffy and the Senate separately announced that Duffy had repaid.

The source of the $90,172 was a personal cheque from Nigel Wright, who was then Chief of Staff in the PMO. The payment was made by bank draft to Duffy's lawyer dated March 25, 2013. This did not become public until May 14, 2013.

On May 15, 2013, the Prime Minister's Office confirmed that Wright had provided Duffy with a personal cheque. The federal Ethics Commissioner announced that he would review the case.

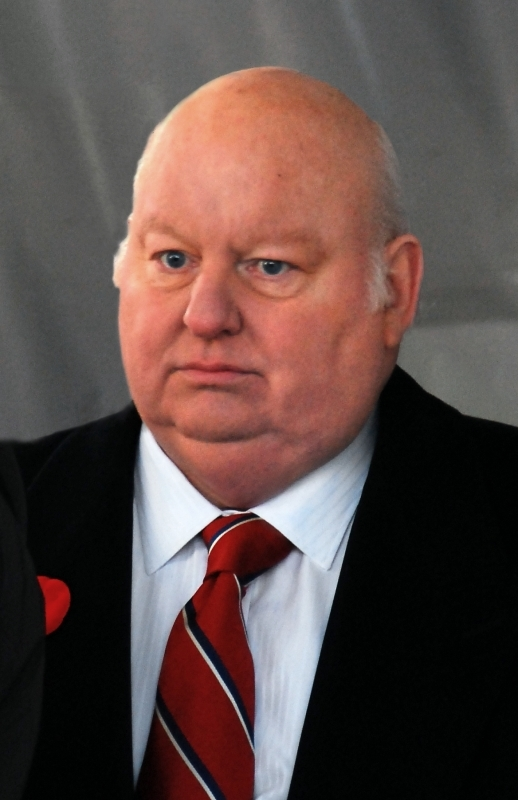
Mike Duffy

The next day, Duffy resigned from the Conservative caucus; he now sits as an independent senator.

On May 19, 2013, Wright announced that he had resigned from the PMO. On May 22, 2013, Harper denied knowledge of the cheque. Harper's legal adviser also denied knowledge of the cheque.

On May 29, 2013, the Senate amended its May 9 report on Duffy's expenses, noting that Duffy's "continued presence at his Ottawa residence over the years" did not support his declaration of Cavendish, PEI as his primary residence. The Senate would refer the matter to the authorities.

According to unnamed sources, in February 2013 the Prime Minister's legal advisor, Benjamin Perrin, drafted a letter of understanding between Nigel Wright, the Prime Minister's Chief of Staff, and Duffy. The sources suggest that the letter stated Wright's intention to transfer $90,172 to cover Duffy's invalid expense claims. Perrin claims that the story is false. On July 30, 2014, the Law Society of British Columbia announced that it closed its file related to Perrin's alleged role in the affair because the complaint was not valid. On October 25, 2014, the Law Society of Upper Canada also reported that after fully investigating, it had no concerns whatsoever with Perrin's conduct as a lawyer.

=== Public statements ===
On June 5, 2013, Harper said in Parliament that: "it was Mr. Wright who made the decision to take his personal funds and give those to Mr. Duffy so that Mr. Duffy could reimburse the taxpayers. Those were his decisions. They were not communicated to me or to members of my office."

On October 21, 2013, Duffy's lawyer claimed that the Prime Minister's Office "pushed" Duffy into accepting the cheque, contrary to the Prime Minister's statements that no one in his office other than Wright knew of the deal. The next day, Duffy told the Senate that Harper personally told Duffy to repay the money, quoting him as saying, "It's not about what you did. It's about the perception of what you did that's been created in the media. The rules are inexplicable to our base."

On October 28, 2013, Harper stated in an interview that Wright had been "dismissed," contradicting his previous statements, made in the spring, that Wright had made his own decision to resign.

Also on October 28, Duffy announced that the Conservative Party – via their chief lawyer, Arthur Hamilton – paid all of his legal fees relating to the scandal, tabling a cheque stub and corresponding memo as proof. Duffy also tabled documents supporting the legality of his residency claims. Duffy also tabled an email sent to him from Nigel Wright's account at the Prime Minister's Office; the PMO had previously claimed that none existed in response to an Access to Information Act request.

=== RCMP investigation ===
The RCMP started its investigation in March 2013 after media reported that the Senate had retained Deloitte in relation to the expenses of Brazeau, Duffy and Harb.

On June 6, 2013, the Royal Canadian Mounted Police (RCMP) filed documents with the courts, revealing that three senior members of the Prime Minister's Office and another Conservative senator, Irving Gerstein, knew about the transfer of Wright's funds. According to the documents, the Conservative Party of Canada initially intended to pay $30,000 for Duffy to repay his expenses before they learned the full amount, and that Duffy was being investigated over three separate allegations of fraud.

On June 13, 2013, the RCMP confirmed they were beginning an Official investigation into Nigel Wright. On June 24, 2013, the lead investigator, Cpl. Greg Horton, put to the courts an affidavit reporting a June 19 meeting with Nigel Wright's lawyers. Later, one of the lawyers told the RCMP that Wright remembers that he told his executive assistant David van Hemmen, Harper's legal adviser Benjamin Perrin, and PMO Director of Issues Management Chris Woodcock about his intention to give Duffy the money.

On April 15, 2014, the RCMP announced that they had found "no ground for criminal charges" against Wright and dropped their investigation into the matter, returning it to the federal Ethics Commissioner. An anonymous source stated, "It was decided that it was best for him to act as a witness." Harper would not be interviewed by the RCMP. Sources said the RCMP decided not to charge Wright following an interview with him as there was a lack of evidence he had criminal intent. The RCMP obtained information from Wright through his lawyer in June 2013, and interviewed Wright on July 18, 2013.

=== Criminal charges ===
On July 17, 2014, the RCMP announced that it had laid 31 criminal charges against Duffy, including fraud under s. 380 of the Criminal Code, breach of trust by a public officer under s. 122, bribery of a judicial officer under s. 119(1)(a), and frauds on the government under s. 121(1)(c). Two charges related to the living expense claims, 18 to claiming expenses unrelated to Senate business, 8 to awarding of consulting contracts, and 3 to Wright's payment of $90,000.

=== Duffy's trial ===
Duffy's trial began on April 7, 2015, at the Ontario Court of Justice in Ottawa. He pleaded not guilty to all 31 charges. Charles Vaillancourt, who was the presiding judge in the case, found Duffy not guilty on all 31 charges. The Crown decided not to appeal, saying that Crown's right of appeal is limited to errors of law.

== Pamela Wallin ==
=== Senate investigation ===
Wallin's travel expense claims came under investigation in November 2012 because she had an "unusual travel pattern". When travelling between her declared primary residence in Saskatchewan and Ottawa, Wallin often stopped over in Toronto and claimed the Toronto leg as part of her expenses. A senator may claim travel expenses only if parliamentary business is being conducted at the travel destination.

Preliminary findings indicated "a pattern of claiming Senate expenses on personal or other business unrelated to the Senate, including boards she sits on." Wallin earned approximately $1 million in stock options and fees while on corporate boards since her appointment as senator. A Postmedia News analysis indicated Wallin was ranked second highest in overall spending at $369,593 behind recently retired Conservative Senator Gerry St. Germain, who spent $378,292 during the same period.

Deloitte determined that travel claims totalling $390,182 were appropriate under Senate practice, $121,348 were not appropriate and should be reimbursed, and $20,978 were questionable and subject to interpretation by the Senate Steering Committee.

Although Wallin did not meet two of the four "indicators" of primary residence (provincial health card and tax return), and had not provided sufficient information as to voting location, Deloitte concluded that her primary residence, as declared, was in Saskatchewan. This was based on travel patterns, no privately owned property in Ottawa for a significant period of time, and time in Ottawa being almost exclusively for Senate business.

=== Repayment ===
Wallin reimbursed the Senate $38,369 following her own review, and an additional $114,538 inclusive of interest in September 2013.

Senator Wallin delivered a speech in the Senate, where she condemned the body for ignoring the rule of law:

"Why is the Senate acting as accuser, judge, jury, and executioner before I have had a day in court? That's exactly why this whole process [is] flawed. If this chamber can take this extreme action with regard to a sitting senator, imagine what it can do to an ordinary citizen who crosses the government of the day. ... The issue is no longer about expenses, or audits, or transparency, or accountability, or even the reputation of this chamber — it's about an abuse of power. ... They were targeted leaks, many of them incorrect, designed to cast my conduct in the worst possible light. They were personal and vindictive, and they violated the rules of this place. ... The government [put] the sentencing before the trial..."

=== Resignation from caucus ===
In May 2013, Wallin resigned from the Senate Conservative caucus pending the results of the external audit of her expenses.

=== RCMP investigation ===
The results of the Deloitte audit were referred to the RCMP for criminal investigation.

By March 2015, the RCMP had identified 150 "suspicious" claims, with 21 of these involving her role on boards of Bell Media and BMO Harris Private Banking, and as chancellor for the University of Guelph. In August 2015 the RCMP referred its file to Crown prosecutors for decision whether criminal charges would be laid. A month after Duffy was found not guilty, the RCMP announced that it was no longer pursuing charges against Wallin.

== Suspension of Duffy, Wallin and Brazeau ==
After two weeks of debate, on November 5, 2013, the Senate voted to suspend Mike Duffy, Pamela Wallin and Patrick Brazeau without pay and most benefits. The Senators kept their health and dental benefits as well as their life insurance. The Senators were expected to be automatically and fully reinstated with the dissolution of Parliament prior to the 42nd Canadian general election, but due to pending charges against Duffy and Brazeau, certain Senate resources remain unavailable to them.

Following Duffy's acquittal on all charges, he returned to the Senate in full standing.

== Expenses eligible for reimbursement ==
=== Constitutional context ===
Each province or territory is allocated a set number of Senate seats, so that Canada's regions have a voice in the legislative process, even if their population is comparatively small.

Senators must own property in the region for which they are appointed, and they "shall be resident" in that region. There is no definition of "resident".

=== Primary residence ===
Senators are expected to remain members of the region which they represent and to continue public duties there, as well as attending to Senate business in Ottawa. Senators whose primary residence is more than 100 kilometres from Ottawa are entitled to claim living expenses (accommodation and per diems) while in Ottawa on Senate business, and travel costs to commute between Ottawa and their primary residence. The Ottawa location must be the senator's secondary residence for this entitlement to arise. Senators must make an annual declaration of primary and secondary residence, and keep it updated.

Deloitte LLP was the audit firm hired by the Senate to investigate the expense claims of Brazeau, Duffy, Harb, and Wallin. The review periods of the Deloitte audits were: April 1, 2011 to September 30, 2012, for Brazeau, Duffy, and Harb, and for Wallin, the review period was January 1, 2009 to September 30, 2012.

During the Deloitte review periods, the Senate regulations and guidelines did not contain criteria for determining which location was a senator's primary residence. Terms used without being clearly defined were: primary residence, secondary residence, NCR residence, and provincial residence.

The maximum living expenses claimable were $20,000, which increased to $22,000 under the Senate's June 5, 2012 Travel Policy.

The only definition of primary residence in the documents reviewed by Deloitte was in the Senator's Travel Policy that was effective June 5, 2012. That policy defined primary residence as "the residence identified by the senator as his/her main residence and is situated in the province or territory represented by the senator."

On December 6, 2012, the Senate Steering Committee asked Senate Administration to assess whether the declarations of primary residence of all senators were sufficiently supported by documentation. Senators were asked to provide: 1. driver's license, 2. provincial health card, 3. provincial income tax return; and 4. signed statement of voting location. Deloitte referred to these as "indicators" of primary residence.

On February 28, 2013, the committee reported that it was satisfied with the documentation provided and no further senators were to be referred for external review.

The Senator's Travel Policy was reviewed to "comply with primary residence declarations" and a report was made on May 9, 2013. Among the recommendations was that the following be deleted from the Senate Rules: "Senators act on their personal honour and Senators are presumed to have acted honourably in carrying out their administrative functions unless and until the Senate or the Internal Economy Committee determines otherwise." The definitions of National Capital accommodation and provincial residence were changed, but no reference was made to changing the definition of primary residence.

=== Travel for parliamentary business ===
Senators may claim travel expenses, under a 64-point travel system, when the purpose of the trip is for parliamentary business.

The Senator's Resource Guide that was in effect during the Deloitte review periods stipulated that travel expenses would be paid when senators were carrying out "their parliamentary functions within their region, to and from Ottawa, and elsewhere in Canada ..." The June 5, 2012 Travel Policy was to the same effect, and included an elaboration that funding under the 64-point system is intended for "travel incurred in the carrying out of Senators' parliamentary functions or that is otherwise incurred for the service of the Senate." Travel for personal concerns, private business interests, or related to the election of an MP during a federal election was specifically excluded. An appendix provided examples of travel purposes that would or would not be funded.

Deloitte and the Auditor General noted that the June 5, 2012 Travel Policy did not make substantive changes to the Senate's previous travel policies. Some senators agreed with this interpretation, while other senators were of the view that this policy "changed the requirements that applied to them."

When claiming their travel expenses, senators indicated on their claim form that the purpose of the trip was for parliamentary or Senate business. They were required to retain details of the nature of the business for seven years. However, the Auditor General noted that in "many cases", senators did not keep these records.

== The Auditor General's Report ==
=== Background ===
In June 2012, after doing a performance audit of Senate Administration, the Auditor General reported that "improvements were needed so that documentation would be sufficient to demonstrate that the transactions [authorized] were for parliamentary business." In late 2012 and early 2013, "questions arose" as to the living expenses of Brazeau, Duffy, and Harb, and the travel expenses of Wallin. On June 6, 2013, the Senate asked the Auditor General to "conduct a comprehensive audit of Senate expenses, including Senators' expenses."

The audit encompassed all expenses of 116 senators and former senators over a two-year period between April 1, 2011, and March 31, 2013. In determining whether expenses were incurred for parliamentary business, the "fundamental principle" of the audit was that "public funds should not be used to pay for personal or private activities."

=== Overview of results ===
The Auditor General reported that "the oversight, accountability, and transparency of Senators' expenses was quite simply not adequate." A "transformational change" was needed in all areas of senators' expenses: how these are "claimed, managed, controlled, and reviewed."

=== Recommendations ===
Independent oversight of senators' expenses needs to be established. The Standing Senate Committee on Internal Economy, Budgets and Administration (the "Internal Economy Committee") has the statutory authority over all financial and administrative matters. This includes budget authorization, setting and clarifying policies for senators' entitlement to claim expenses, and deciding in individual cases whether an expense claim is appropriate. Because this Senate committee is composed of individual senators, there is a conflict of interest which "may give rise to a perceived lack of objectivity." An oversight body whose membership is independent of the Senate should be established, along with mandating the Auditor General as the external auditor.

Senators should "collectively determine a core set of principles that weigh the cost to taxpayers against the expenditures necessary to conduct parliamentary business." This recommendation arose because the Auditor General "found many occasions where Senators' choices could have been less costly, particularly in relation to travel, per diems, and telecommunications."

Senators need to maintain detailed records of the nature of the parliamentary business for which an expense is incurred, and submit these details to Senate Administration when making expense claims.

Establish greater transparency. Senators should disclose "any close personal or business relationships, or outside interests" relating to claims and expenditures. In some cases, this disclosure would be made to Senate Administration and in other cases, made public on the Senate website.

Ensure that the "financial management practices" of the Office of the Speaker of the Senate are consistent with those that govern all senator expenses.

=== Findings on individual senators ===
Thirty senators or former senators were found to have made inappropriate or ineligible expense claims. Of the 30, the Auditor General recommended that nine cases (detailed in Appendix A) be referred for police investigation. The other 21 cases (detailed in Appendix B) were recommended for review by the Senate's Internal Economy Committee to make a determination whether the expenses were for parliamentary business.

The Senate referred all 30 cases to the RCMP. As at March 16, 2016, the RCMP found no evidence to warrant criminal charges against 24 of the 30 senators, including Pierre-Hughes Boisvenu, Sharon Carstairs, William Rompkey and Rod Zimmer. The RCMP is still investigating six senators, including Marie-P. Charette-Poulin, Colin Kenny, Rose-Marie Losier-Cool, Donald Oliver and Gerry St. Germain.

A dispute resolution process through binding arbitration was established for senators who disagreed with the Auditor General's findings. Ian Binnie, retired Supreme Court of Canada Justice, led the arbitration.

==== The nine cases ====
In each of the nine cases recommended for police investigation, the Auditor General found one or both of the following:

"The Senator or former Senator had made ineligible claims for living expenses incurred while in the National Capital Region and other travel expenses when we determined that the Senator or former Senator had not established a substantive presence at his or her declared primary residence....

"There was such a pervasive lack of evidence, or significant contradictory evidence, that we were prevented from reaching an audit opinion about whether the expenses had been incurred for parliamentary business."

The nine senators are:

(i) Pierre-Hughes Boisvenu: both primary residence and parliamentary business issues

(ii) Sharon Carstairs (resigned): primary residence issue

(iii) Marie-P. Charette-Poulin (resigned): parliamentary business issue

(iv) Colin Kenny: parliamentary business issue

(v) Rose-Marie Losier-Cool (retired): both primary residence and parliamentary business issues

(vi) Donald Oliver (retired): parliamentary business issue

(vii) William Rompkey (retired): primary residence issue

(viii) Gerry St. Germain (retired): parliamentary business issue

(ix) Rod Zimmer (resigned): both primary residence and parliamentary business issues

The repayment status of the nine senators and the results of arbitration of the two who opted for arbitration as at May 31, 2016 are:

(i) Pierre-Hughes Boisvenu: repaid $908 out of $61,076; arbitrator ruled $20,467 still owing and this was repaid

(ii) Sharon Carstairs: repaid none of $7,527 and amount is outstanding

(iii) Marie-P. Charette-Poulin: repaid $5,606 out of $131,434 and $125,828 is outstanding

(iv) Colin Kenny: repaid $3,921 out of $35,549; arbitrator ruled $27,458 still owing and this was repaid

(v) Rose-Marie Losier-Cool: repaid none of $110,051 and amount is outstanding

(vi) Donald Oliver: repaid $23,395 out of $48,088 and $24,738 is outstanding

(vii) Bill Rompkey: repaid none of $17,292 and amount is outstanding

(viii) Gerry St. Germain: repaid $468 out of $67,588 and $67,105 is outstanding

(ix) Rod Zimmer: repaid none of $176,012 and amount is outstanding

==== The twenty-one cases ====
The Auditor General recommended that the Senate's Internal Economy Committee review 21 cases and make a determination as to eligibility to claim the expenses because:

"we could not accept the Senators' expenses as having been incurred for parliamentary business, because of the nature or significance of the transactions, or because there was insufficient information to support them, or

"we determined the expenses were not in accordance with the applicable Senate rules, policies, or guidelines."

The repayment status of the 21 senators and results of arbitration of the 12 senators who opted for arbitration, as at May 31, 2016 are:

(i) Claude Carignan: repaid all of $3,516

(ii) James Cowan: repaid all of $10,397

(iii) Jean-Guy Dagenais: repaid none of $3,538; arbitrator ruled $2,267 still owing and this was repaid

(iv) Joseph Day: repaid $2,850 out of $19,634; arbitrator ruled $3,050 still owing and this was repaid

(v) Nicole Eaton: repaid all of $3,489

(vi) Leo Housakos: repaid all of $8,319

(vii) Janis Johnson: repaid all of $22,706

(viii) Noel Kinsella (resigned): repaid all of $9,386

(ix) Sandra Lovelace Nicholas: repaid none of $75,227; arbitrator ruled $38,023 still owing and this was repaid

(x) Elaine McCoy: repaid all of $10,298

(xi) Terry Mercer: repaid none of $29,338; arbitrator ruled $10,536 still owing and this was repaid

(xii) Pana Merchant: repaid $511 out of $5,500; arbitrator ruled $463 still owing and this was repaid

(xiii) Lowell Murray (retired): repaid $976 out of $16,300; arbitrator ruled $15,324 still owing and this was repaid

(xiv) Dennis Glen Patterson: repaid $9,223 out of $22,985; arbitrator ruled $13,762 still owing and this was repaid

(xv) Robert Peterson (retired): repaid none of $11,493; arbitrator ruled all still owing and this was repaid

(xvi) Donald Neil Plett: repaid $2,975 out of $4,095; arbitrator ruled $404 still owing and this was repaid

(xvii) Vivienne Poy (resigned): repaid all of $15,317

(xviii) Nancy Greene Raine: repaid all of $2,800

(ixx) Nick Sibbeston: repaid none of $50,102; arbitrator ruled $26,924 still owing and this was repaid

(xx) Terry Stratton (retired): repaid none of $5,466; arbitrator ruled all still owing and this was repaid

(xxi) David Tkachuk: repaid $3,920 out of $7,391; arbitrator ruled $1,813 still owing and this was repaid

== Aftermath ==
In the news release accompanying the March 21, 2016 release of former Justice Binnie's arbitration report, the Senate said that the report would assist in its efforts to "bring clarity" to Senate expense claim rules.

As part of its modernization, the Senate has "made several significant changes including tightening expense provisions for travel, hospitality and procurement; requiring proof of residency; implementing a new Ethics and Conflict of Interest Code that ranks among the toughest in the Commonwealth; and the establishment of an independent Office of the Senate Ethics Officer." The Senate will also introduce "a more detailed model of proactive disclosure and more independent oversight measures."

== See also ==
- List of political scandals in Canada
- United Kingdom parliamentary expenses scandal
