= Ray Novak =

Chief of Staff of the Canadian Prime Minister

Ray Novak LVO

14th Chief of Staff to the Prime Minister
- In office May 19, 2013 – November 4, 2015
- Prime Minister: Stephen Harper
- Deputy: Jenni Byrne; Joanne McNamara
- Preceded by: Nigel Wright
- Succeeded by: Katie Telford

Principal Secretary to the Prime Minister
- In office 2008–2013
- Prime Minister: Stephen Harper
- Preceded by: Francis Fox
- Succeeded by: Gerald Butts

Personal details
- Born: March 30, 1977 (age 49)
- Party: Conservative
- Other political affiliations: Canadian Alliance, Reform Party
- Education: University of Western Ontario; University of Calgary

Raymond Novak (born March 30, 1977) is a Canadian political strategist, who was appointed as Stephen Harper's fourth Chief of Staff on May 19, 2013, following the dismissal of Nigel Wright. He was the 14th person to serve as Chief of Staff since the creation of the position. He served in the role until November 4, 2015 following the defeat of the Harper government.

Educated in political science at the University of Western Ontario and the University of Calgary, Novak first entered politics as an intern in the offices of Preston Manning and Rob Anders. He was later a researcher for the National Citizens Coalition while Stephen Harper was leading the organization. When Harper moved into Stornoway, Novak lived rent-free in an apartment above the official residence's garage.

Ray Novak was employed in the Prime Minister's Office since Harper's entry in 2006, undertaking several roles.

He is personal friends with Kory Teneycke and Jenni Byrne, all of whom were close advisors to Prime Minister Stephen Harper. The three met while working for the Reform Party of Canada during the 1997 Canadian federal election.
