= Guy Giorno =

Canadian lawyer (born 1965)

12th Chief of Staff to the Prime Minister
- In office July 1, 2008 – January 1, 2011
- Prime Minister: Stephen Harper
- Preceded by: Ian Brodie
- Succeeded by: Nigel Wright

Chief of Staff to the Premier of Ontario
- In office 2000–2002
- Premier: Mike Harris
- Succeeded by: Steve Pengelly

Personal details
- Born: 1965 (age 60–61) Toronto, Ontario
- Party: Conservative
- Education: University of Toronto
- Profession: Lawyer

Guy Giorno (born 1965) is a Canadian lawyer and conservative political activist. He has served in the administration of Ontario Premier Mike Harris and Canadian prime minister Stephen Harper. He is described to come from the Mike Harris school of politics.

== Career ==
Giorno graduating from the University of Toronto’s law school in 1989, he wrote speeches for Mike Harris in his 1990 Ontario Tory leadership run. Giorno served an adviser and Chief of Staff to then Premier of Ontario Mike Harris in 2000. A devout and conservative Roman Catholic, Giorno took credit for changes to the school board property tax system in Ontario, taking away the ability of school boards to set local tax rates, which had the effect of equalizing per-student funding between public and Catholic schools. Giorno along with Mike Harris were seen as the only two insiders within the Ontario Progressive Party sympathetic to the Reform Party. During the 2008 federal election, Paul Wells questioned if Giorno improved the fortune of the OPC after he became chief of staff to Mike Harris.

In 2002 he joined the Toronto office of the Fasken Martineau DuMoulin law firm. On July 1, 2008, Giorno succeeded Ian Brodie as chief of staff in the Prime Minister's Office of Canadian prime minister Stephen Harper. During his time, ministers who worked with him during the Harris government underneath his tenure as chief of staff such as Finance Minister Jim Flaherty, Industry Minister Tony Clement, and, particularly, Transport Minister John Baird rose in prominence. He was blamed for several strategic missteps by the Harper government, including a 2008 measure to strip political parties of their public funding that nearly led the government to fall, and an unpopular move to prorogue Parliament in January, 2010; he was also assumed to have pushed for the government's outlawing of Canadian foreign aid funding going to organizations overseas that were involved with abortion. During the 2017 Conservative race, Brad Trost demanded that he should pay back moving expense, Giorno made eight years ago.

He returned to Fasken Martineau effective January 1, 2011, and was replaced as chief of staff by Nigel S. Wright. He is a fellow at the University of Toronto School of Public Policy & Governance.

In January 2011 he was appointed national campaign chair of the Conservative Party's re-election effort. He also served as national campaign chair in 2015. He was investigated and cleared by the party due to his role in the sexual assault cases against former MP Rick Dykstra. Macleans's noted that Giorno advocated for the removal of Dykstra.

In February 2017, Giorno was named chief integrity officer and lobbyist registrar for the city of Brampton, Ontario, effective April 1 of that year. He later left in 2019 due to his relationship with Patrick Brown, who elected as Mayor of Brampton in 2018. He later became an anti-bribery lawyer for the Toronto law firm Fasken.

Giorno currently serves as integrity commissioner for North Bay, Ontario—a position he has held since 2019.
