= Katie Telford =

Canadian political aide

15th Chief of Staff to the Prime Minister
- In office November 4, 2015 – March 14, 2025
- Prime Minister: Justin Trudeau
- Preceded by: Ray Novak
- Succeeded by: Marco Mendicino

Personal details
- Born: 1978 (age 47–48)
- Party: Liberal Party of Canada; Ontario Liberal Party
- Spouse: Rob Silver
- Education: University of Ottawa

Katie Telford (born 1978) is a former Canadian government official and political strategist who served as the 15th Chief of Staff to the Prime Minister from 2015 to 2025 under Prime Minister Justin Trudeau. She served as Trudeau's chief campaign advisor during his successful campaign in the 2015 federal election. Following the resignation of Gerald Butts, Telford was widely regarded as the most senior official in Trudeau's Prime Minister's Office and has held critical leadership roles in the 2019 and 2021 Liberal election campaigns. She is the longest-serving chief of staff to a Canadian prime minister, serving the entirety of Trudeau's 9-year term.

== Early life and education ==
Telford was raised in Toronto. Her parents were public servants; her father was Australian and her mother was from Hamilton, Ontario.

When Telford was 12, she worked as a page for several weeks in the Ontario legislature. She studied political science at the University of Ottawa, where she joined the debate club and ultimately became the club's president. The team was a two-time national semi-finalist and finished high at the world championship event in Glasgow, Scotland.

== Career ==
=== Advisor to Ontario Education Minister Gerrard Kennedy ===
After graduating from university, Telford joined the staff of Ontario Liberal MPP Gerrard Kennedy as his legislative assistant, starting working coincidentally on the day of the September 11 attacks. Kennedy's office was sensitive terrain at the time for a number of reasons. In the preceding leadership contest, Kennedy was the charismatic frontrunner who led through the first four ballots before being defeated by fourth place contender Dalton McGuinty. Despite being the incumbent MPP for York South, Kennedy was pressured to yield the new York South—Weston seat, consisting of 81% of his former constituency, to neighbouring MPP Joseph Cordiano, the leadership rival who delivered the final blow to his leadership bid, and was re-elected with an impressive 10000 votes margin in Parkdale—High Park, encompassed only 19% of his former territory, against another leadership rival who defected to the governing Progressive Conservatives. With the Ontario Liberals having lost the provincial election in June 1999 after leading in polls for much of the final months of the previous legislature, McGuinty handed Kennedy the high-profile education portfolio in shadow cabinet.

Kennedy was named education minister when the Liberals formed government in 2003. In August 2004 just days before turning 26, Telford was promoted to be chief of staff to Kennedy, a notable appointment and an early sign of her calling as senior political aide. She was the youngest ministerial chief of staff at Queen's Park at the time, a rare exception in a new government with many eager veteran aides after over a decade in opposition. Her minister, had a well earned reputation as a demanding high-performer, and was given charge of the education ministry after a decade of labour unrest in the sector under the Progressive Conservatives. During Telford's tenure as Kennedy's chief aide, the McGuinty Liberals delivered their 2005 "education budget" designed to tackle the structural deficits in the education system. Kennedy established that same year a province-wide negotiating framework with the province's teachers' unions with the result that most school boards settled their contracts without lost teaching time, and announced that 90–95% of Ontario students between junior kindergarten and Grade Three would be in classes of twenty students or fewer by 2007. Telford later credited Kennedy for her widely known data-driven approach to political campaign and her "obsession" with data. During her time at Queen's Park, Telford also developed a close working relationship with Gerald Butts, policy secretary and then principal secretary in McGuinty's office, with whom she would share the top rank in the Trudeau's Prime Minister's Office a decade later.

==== Kennedy's federal Liberal leadership bid ====
In April 2006, Kennedy resigned as education minister and declared his candidacy for the leadership of the Liberal Party of Canada. Telford left his position in Queen's Park to manage Kennedy's bid, which was not initially viewed as a primary contender due to his inability to speak French fluently. In the early months the contest was generally viewed as between Michael Ignatieff and Bob Rae, each drawing significant caucus and establishment support. Telford steered the campaign to focus on signing up youth members, as a fixed number of delegates spots in each district were reserved for them. His momentum grew significantly after the Toronto Star reported that the Kennedy appeared to have signed up the biggest share of new members, and his stronger than expected membership recruitment made is a wide-open race. Despite not being a sitting caucus member at the time, Kennedy secured the backing of a significant share of the sitting, including many prominent younger MPs, three of them would serve in cabinet a decade later during Telford's tenure at the Prime Minister's office .

Kennedy secured 17.3% of the elected delegates for a third place entry into the convention. He however performed poorly in Quebec, and further alienated Quebec delegates by becoming the first leadership candidate to state his opposition to recognize Québécois "a nation within a united Canada". In a dramatic twist that would prove fateful for Telford, shortly before the convention, Butts arranged a meeting between to have his university friend Justin Trudeau meet with Telford at a coffee shop in downtown Toronto to offered his support to the Kennedy campaign. Trudeau's support for Kennedy and barely-veiled criticism of frontrunner Michael Ignatieff over Quebec nationalism marks the beginning of his formal active involvement in the federal party. Trudeau joined Kennedy's campaign so late that it was no longer possible for him to obtain regular credentials to be present at the convention, requiring Telford to seek guest access for him so he can introduce Kennedy during the candidates' final speeches.

Kennedy secured a disappointing 4th place, 2 votes less than ultimate winner, Stéphane Dion, and the gap increased to 90 votes in second ballot. Kennedy with 884 voters opted to drop out despite being more than 600 votes ahead of last place finisher Ken Dryden, and honoured his pre-convention pack with Dion. His early exit caught the Ignatieff and Rae camps off guard while they were busy fighting each other for the roughly 200 delegates freed up by Dryden's elimination, leaving Kennedy's team to deliver his delegates en masse to Dion with little interference and minimal leakage. Dion gained 800 votes and leapfrogged the two front running on the third ballot, securing the leadership on the fourth. Kennedy was widely credited as Dion's kingmaker.

Telford joined Dion's staff as policy secretary and director of policy and stakeholder relations after the leadership convention, and was promoted as deputy chief of staff in 2008. Given the disastrous end to Dion's leadership, Telford acknowledged her time in the Leader of the Official Opposition office was unpleasant, noting that "It was a pretty ugly time in the party". She returned to Toronto between her positions with Dion and Trudeau, working as a consultant for StrategyCorp in Toronto, a firm then led by David MacNaughton, who Telford met while he was McGuinty's principal secretary, and would later recruit to chair the Ontario campaign that delivered just shy of half of the seats for Trudeau only majority mandate in 2015.

=== Trudeau's campaign chief & Chief of Staff to the Prime Minister ===
Telford remained in contact with Trudeau after the 2006 convention, and advised him the sidelines during his first electoral bid. A few months after Trudeau's election as MP for Papineau in 2008, he asked Telford to help him plan for a future leadership bid. After Dion's resignation as Liberal leader in 2008, Trudeau's name was mentioned as a potential candidate but did not enter the race. Trudeau was one of only 34 Liberal MPs who survived the 2011 election. Despite indicating that he would not be a candidate in October 2011, after interim leader Bob Rae announced he would not be entering the race in June 2012, Trudeau stated that he would reconsider his earlier decision to not seek the leadership and would announce his final decision at the end of the summer.

After resigning as a senior consultant at StrategyCorp, Telford led Trudeau's bid in the 2013 federal liberal leadership contest, which he won with an overwhelming 80% of the points available, and winning the most points in all but five electoral district. She also led the national liberal campaign that saw the Liberal moving from the third party in the commons to form majority government, the first time in Canadian history to win a majority of seats without having been either the governing party or the Official Opposition in the previous parliament. Upon forming government, Trudeau named Telford the Chief of Staff to the Prime Minister, a role she served for the entirety of his premiership.

On September 21, 2016, The Globe and Mail reported that Telford had charged moving expenses to Canadian taxpayers in the amount of $80,382.55 to relocate her residence from Toronto to Ottawa. These expenses included a personalized cash payout of $23,373.71. After it was revealed publicly, Telford agreed to repay a portion of the $80,382.55.

Telford's political influence and authority over the government and the liberal party were further elevated following the February 2019 resignation of the Principal Secretary to the Prime Minister Gerald Butts, a personal friend of Prime Minister Trudeau since university days and Telford's close ally and former colleague in the Ontario McGuinty ministry. Prior to the departure, it was generally accepted that Telford and Butt were of equal stature as the highest-ranking aide to the prime minister and were co-leader of PMO. No other principal secretary was appointed for the remainder of the Trudeau years. Instead, Telford named two deputies, Brian Clow and future Health Minister Marjorie Michel, and remained the sole occupant of the PMO's highest rank until Trudeau's resignation in 2025.

In 2020 and 2021, then Conservative finance critic Pierre Poilievre on multiple occasions alleged that Telford's husband Rob Silver engaged in unlawful unregistered lobbying activities on behalf of his new employer MCAP, a non bank-owned mortgage finance company. It was alleged that Silver participated in meetings and discussions with officials in the Prime Minister's Office, Department of Finance and federal crown agency CMHC that lead to CMHC's decision to outsource the administration of the federal government's COVID-19 emergency rent assistance for small businesses and awarding the contract, worth up to $84 million, to MCAP. In response the Prime Minister's Office noted that Telford proactively reached out to the Conflict of Interest and Ethics Commissioner and the Lobbying Commissioner for direction and set up a voluntary ethics screen before MCAP was awarded the contract. This allegations against Silver was investigated by the Lobbying Commissioner, who cleared him of any wrongdoing.

Telford testified to a House of Commons committee regarding sexual assault allegations in the Canadian Armed Forces and the WE Charity scandal.

Telford has also been called by members of the media and opposition parties to testify about alleged Chinese interference in the 2019 and 2021 federal elections, as of March 2023.

Telford was also influential in Canada's response to the COVID-19 pandemic, and the negotiations of the Liberal-NDP supply and confidence agreement.

=== Post-political career ===
At the 2026 Toronto International Film Festival, Telford and Trudeau announced the launch of Hope & Hard Work, a film and television production company whose initial projects include adaptations of novels by Perry Chafe and Uzma Jalaluddin.

== Personal life ==
Telford is married to Rob Silver, a consultant for a public affairs agency. They have one son.
