= Marco Mendicino =

Canadian politician (born 1973)

The Honourable Marco Mendicino PC
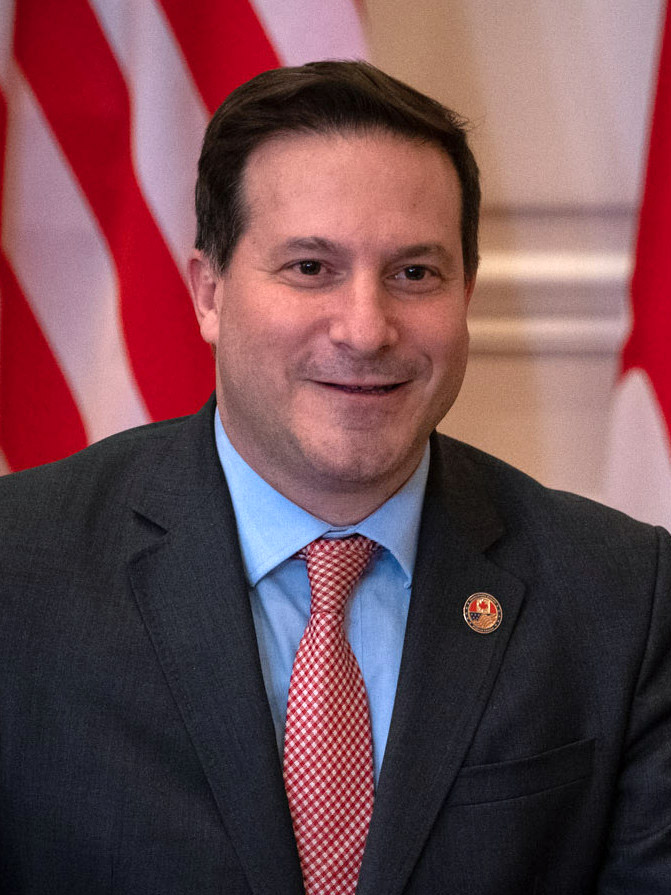
- Mendicino in April 2023

16th Chief of Staff to the Prime Minister
- In office March 14, 2025 – July 7, 2025
- Prime Minister: Mark Carney
- Preceded by: Katie Telford
- Succeeded by: Marc-André Blanchard

Minister of Public Safety
- In office October 26, 2021 – July 26, 2023
- Prime Minister: Justin Trudeau
- Preceded by: Bill Blair
- Succeeded by: Dominic LeBlanc

Minister of Immigration, Refugees and Citizenship
- In office November 20, 2019 – October 26, 2021
- Prime Minister: Justin Trudeau
- Preceded by: Ahmed Hussen
- Succeeded by: Sean Fraser

Parliamentary Secretary to the Minister of Infrastructure and Communities
- In office August 31, 2018 – November 20, 2019
- Minister: François-Philippe Champagne
- Preceded by: Marc Miller

Parliamentary Secretary to the Minister of Justice and Attorney General of Canada
- In office January 30, 2017 – August 30, 2018
- Minister: Jody Wilson-Raybould
- Preceded by: Bill Blair
- Succeeded by: Arif Virani

Member of Parliament for Eglinton—Lawrence
- In office October 19, 2015 – March 14, 2025
- Preceded by: Joe Oliver
- Succeeded by: Vince Gasparro

Personal details
- Born: July 28, 1973 (age 53) Toronto, Ontario, Canada
- Party: Liberal
- Education: Carleton University; University of Windsor; York University
- Profession: Politician; lawyer

Marco Mendicino (Italian: [ˈmarko mendiˈtʃiːno]; born July 28, 1973) is a Canadian lawyer and former politician who served as the 16th chief of staff to the prime minister in 2025. A member of the Liberal Party, he served as the member of Parliament (MP) for Eglinton—Lawrence from 2015 to 2025. He previously served as the minister of immigration, refugees and citizenship from 2019 to 2021 and the minister of public safety from 2021 to 2023.

In a statement issued on January 2, 2025, Mendicino said he would not be running again in the upcoming 2025 federal election, criticizing the Trudeau government for not taking a more pro-Israel stance (such as on the genocide case against Israel). On March 10, 2025, newly elected Prime Minister Mark Carney chose Mendicino as his interim chief of staff; he was succeeded by Marc-André Blanchard in July 2025.

== Early life ==
Mendicino was born in the City of Toronto to Italian immigrant parents. His family's names are on two of the tribute plaques on Villa Charities Italian Canadian Immigrant Tribute. He attended St. Michael's Choir School and graduated high school from Michael Power St. Joseph's. Following high school, he received a BA (Honours) in political science at Carleton University and a Juris Doctor (JD) from the University of Windsor Law School. Later in his career he also studied human resources management at York University's Schulich School of Business.

== As Crown counsel ==
Mendicino worked as a federal prosecutor for ten years, during which time he was involved in the handling of the Toronto 18 terrorism case.

He also worked for the Law Society of Upper Canada, served as the president of the Association of Justice Counsel, and taught as an adjunct professor at Osgoode Hall Law School.

== Political career ==
Mendicino was occasional member of the Eglinton—Lawrence Liberal riding executive, and served as legal counsel to provincial Liberal candidate Mike Colle's campaign in 2014.

=== 2015–2019 ===
Mendicino stood for the federal nomination for the 2015 general election. He faced a major battle for the nomination after Conservative MP Eve Adams crossed the floor to join the Liberal Party. With the support of party leader Justin Trudeau, sought the Liberal nomination in Eglinton—Lawrence. Mendicino secured the support of former interim Liberal leader Bob Rae and nearby incumbent MP Judy Sgro. He defeated Adams at the July 26, 2015, nomination meeting by 1,936 to 1,100 votes.

In the general election, Mendicino faced the incumbent Conservative MP Joe Oliver, who was Minister of Finance, as well as a surprise New Democratic Party nominee in former Saskatchewan finance minister Andrew Thomson. Mendicino attacked Thomson as a parachute candidate. Ultimately, Mendicino won the election.

On January 30, 2017, Mendicino was appointed as Parliamentary Secretary to the Minister of Justice and Attorney General of Canada serving under Jody Wilson-Raybould.

On August 31, 2018, he became Parliamentary Secretary to the Minister of Infrastructure and Communities serving under François-Philippe Champagne.

=== Minister of Immigration, Refugees and Citizenship (2019–2021) ===
Mendicino was re-elected in the 2019 federal election and subsequently named Minister of Immigration, Refugees and Citizenship.

As Minister of Immigration Regulations and Citizenship, Minister Mendicino revamped and modernized immigration policy to protect the Canadian supply chain and support economic recovery through immigration.

During Mendicino's tenure, immigration levels reached their lowest levels since 1998 given global travel restrictions. Mendicino also advanced immigration pilot programs to encourage newcomers to settle in areas outside of major metropolitan cities.

In 2020, Chancellor Angela Merkel of Germany invited him to discuss Canada's Practices on immigration and integration at the 11th German summit on integration.

In December 2020, Minister Mendicino tabled Bill C-8, which received royal assent on June 21, 2021. Bill C-8 amended the Oath or Affirmation of Citizenship Act to include the affirmation and recognition of "Aboriginal and treaty rights of first nationals, Inuit and Métis peoples." He was also responsible for implementing the College of Immigration and Citizenship Consultants Act, which regulated Canadian Immigration consultants.

=== Minister of Public Safety (2021–2023) ===
Mendicino was re-elected in the 2021 federal election, and was appointed Minister of Public Safety on October 26. Minister Mendicino's tenure as Public Safety Minister was marked by participation in Domestic and International efforts to combat foreign interference, counter the rise of ideologically inspired violent extremism, and ensure the security of democratic institutions.

International engagements

Minister Mendicino frequently worked alongside his Five Eyes and G7 Ministerial colleagues. In 2023, he chaired the Five Eyes ministerial conference meeting in Wellington, New Zealand. With his counterparts from Australia, New Zealand, the United Kingdom, and the United States, they agreed to strengthen collaboration on combating foreign inference, tackling child sexual exploitation and abuse online, countering violent extremism and terrorism, strengthening democratic institutions management frameworks for disaster management, addressing irregular migration, and sharing best practice and produces in identifying security threats.

During Germany's presidency of the G7 in 2022, Minister Medicino met with his G7 colleagues, where they discussed support for Ukraine, deterring Russian foreign interference, terrorism, and cybercrime.

In 2021 and 2023, Minister Mendicino accompanied Prime Minister of Canada Justin Trudeau, Deputy Prime Minister and Minister of Finance Chrystia Freeland, the Minister of Foreign Affairs Mélanie Joly, and the Minister of International Trade, Export Promotion, Small Business and Economic Development, Mary Ng to the North American Leaders' summit.

Domestic

In his mandate letter, Prime Minister Justin Trudeau tasked Minister Mendicino with the implementation of legislation to combat gun violence, Enhancing oversight for decisions made by the Royal Canadian Mounted Police (RCMP) and Canada Border Services Agency (CBSA), safeguarding Canadian intellectual property (IP), advancing cyber security, combat electoral interference and counter the rise of ideologically inspired violent extremism, combating systemic racism and discrimination in the justice system, strengthening and working on the implementation of a National Action Plan on Combatting Hate, and strengthening Canada's borders.

Minister Mendicino tabled, Bill c-20, and Bill c-21. Bill c-20 created the Public Complaints and Review Commission (PCRC) an enhanced independent review body for the RCMP and CBSA, allowing those who felt mistreated by the bodies above to launch a formal complaint process.

Bill C-21, is considered Canada's most substantial gun control bill. The Bill acted as a national handgun freeze, restricting handguns' sale, purchase, transfer, or importation. The Bill codified the national handgun freeze restricting the sale, purchase, transfer or importation of handguns, classified any "unlawfully manufactured firearm," including ghost guns, as a "prohibited firearm," as well as any firearm that is not a handgun, discharges center-fire ammunition in a semi-automatic manner, and was originally designed with a detachable cartridge magazine with a capacity of six cartridges or more. Bill C-21 also included efforts to strengthen border security and law enforcement. It increased the maximum penalty for offences such as firearms trafficking, smuggling and the illegal manufacture of firearms from 10 to 14 years imprisonment. Permitted sharing firearm license information with law enforcement across Canada. Expanded the number of firearm offences eligible for wiretapping, added offences for posing or distributing computer data to create firearms using a 3D printer, and allowed Canada Border Service officers to ban the entrance of foreign nationals who have committed previous firearm offences, such as smuggling.

In June 2023, Minister Mendicino added the Severe Hate-Motivated Incident Support (SHMIS) Stream to the Security Infrastructure program. This stream allows synagogues, Jewish day schools, and community centers to secure funding to cover up to 50% of expenditures, up to a maximum of $100,000, for security enhancement projects.

==== Emergencies Act ====
Minister Mendicino oversaw the first ever invocation of the Emergencies Act in response to the 2022 Freedom Convoy protests in February 2022. Scrutiny from media and opposition followed regarding whether the use of the Act was necessary.

Media questioned whether law enforcement asked for the Act's use. This question stems from testimony on 26 April before the DEDC committee, in which Mendicino noted in response to a question from Bloc Quebecois MP Rheal Fortin that the government "invoked the act because it was the advice of non-partisan professional law enforcement that the existing authorities were ineffective at the time to restore public safety." In response to questions from Liberal MP Rachel Bendayan he said:

We invoked the act because it was the advice of non-partisan professional law enforcement that existing authorities were ineffective at the time to restore public safety at all of the ports of entry you mentioned.

Mendicino then addressed the media's questions surrounding cabinet confidence, and whether this provision would be lifted for the purposes of the public inquiry that is written into the Emergencies Act, called the Rouleau inquiry.

On April 27, Prime Minister Justin Trudeau told the House of Commons that "police were clear that they needed tools not held by any federal, provincial or territorial law."

On 19 May 2022 Shadow Minister of Emergency Preparedness Dane Lloyd asked Mendicino about the need for the invocation of the Emergencies Act and elicited the comment that the latter "stands by previous statements that the federal government invoked the Emergencies Act on the recommendation of law enforcement officials."

On 11 May 2022 RCMP Commissioner Brenda Lucki stated under oath to the DEDC committee that "while her agency was consulted, it never requested nor recommended the [Emergency Act]'s use". On 17 May the interim Ottawa police chief Steve Bell testified at PROC committee that he did not request the invocation of the Emergencies Act from the government. Another police service that was involved in the Freedom Convoy protests was the Ontario Provincial Police, and testimony on 24 March before the SECU committee from its commissioner Thomas Carrique led many to believe that Carrique made the request, Mendicino clarified in testimony given to the SECU committee on 17 May when he prevaricated.

Mendicino's Deputy Minister answered questions before the DEDC committee on 8 June, in which he testified that the minister "was misunderstood", and on 14 June the Official Opposition called for Mendicino to resign.

On 15 June before the DEDC committee, Minister of Emergency Preparedness Bill Blair and Minister of Finance Chrystia Freeland spoke to questions about recommendations from law enforcement to invoke the Emergencies Act. Minister Blair notes, "I’m not aware of any recommendation of law enforcement. Quite frankly, this is a decision of government." Deputy Prime Minister Freeland said "I would like to take the personal responsibility for that decision [to invoke the Emergencies Act], it was my opinion it was the correct decision," and "a last resort". DEDC committee co-chair Fortin was unable to get a direct answer to his questions about what steps the federal government tried taking before invoking the last resort. MP and committee co-chair Matthew Green repeatedly asked whether Freeland "took notes at high-level meetings she had with bank officials about the economic measures in the emergency declaration," and after getting no response during his allotted time for questions, a frustrated Green said "that is unreal."

==== Chinese government interference in Canadian federal elections ====
On February 19, 2023, while speaking to Mercedes Stephenson of Global News' The West Block, Mendicino did not answer whether the panel appointed to review the integrity of recent federal elections ever saw the CSIS intelligence reports that warned of attempts by China at election interference. In the interview, Mendicino stated: “We’ve always been up front with the fact that there is foreign interference, that we need to be eyes wide open and vigilant about it”.

On March 10, 2023, Mendicino held a press conference to announce that the Liberal Government would begin consultations on foreign influence registry to combat Chinese interference. He took questions from the media surrounding the lack of timeline for the project, and why Canada is not acting faster, when other commonwealth nations have had established registries for foreign influence for years.

==== Paul Bernardo transfer ====
In May 2023, after spending a decade at Millhaven Institution, serial rapist and serial killer Paul Bernardo was transferred to La Macaza Institution, a medium-security facility in Quebec. The transfer caused controversy and the reason for the transfer was not provided to the public. On June 15, Mendicino said that there was a "breakdown in information flow" in his office and did not explain why he was unaware of preparations to transfer Bernardo. Mendicino's office first learned of Bernardo's potential transfer on March 2. The transfer occurred on May 29, but Mendicino was not informed of the transfer until the day after, despite his office being informed by the Correctional Service of Canada on May 25.

On July 20, 2023, Minister Mendicino issued a Ministerial Direction to the Correctional Service of Canada (CSC) in response to their handling of Bernardo's optional transfer, emphasizing that they must commit to ensuring victims' rights are considered by Correctional Services of Canada (CSC). His directive called for the CSC to gather and consider information from victims as soon as a voluntary transfer request is being considered by the CSC, notify victims when they begin considering transfer applications and collect input from them in advance, and require all CSC staff to consider the proximity of victims to the insition the application for transfer lists.

Anne Kelly, commissioner of Correctional Service Canada, presented a review of Bernardo's transfer and concluded that “the decisions to reclassify Paul Bernardo to medium and transfer him to La Macaza were sound, and followed all applicable laws and policies.” he review also stated that prior to the transfer on the morning of May 29, the victims and their families received “heads up” notifications. These calls were not a requirement of any policy but were done due to the extreme sensitivity to the case.

Mendocino was dropped from cabinet and replaced as Public Safety Minister by Dominic LeBlanc during a cabinet shuffle on July 26, 2023, with the media attributing his demotion to the controversy around the Bernardo transfer.

=== Israeli–Palestinian conflict ===
On January 16, 2024, Canadian officials said they would abide by whatever the International Court of Justice rules in South Africa's genocide case against Israel. On January 19, Marco Mendicino wrote that Canada should have unequivocally rejected South Africa's claim. Mendicino said it was a "perversion of justice" to accuse Israel of genocide, given that Jews suffered during the Holocaust.

On March 19, 2024, Marco Mendicino voted against a Parliamentary motion "calling on the international community to work toward a two-state solution to resolve the conflict between Israel and the Palestinians". The motion was supported by the NDP and most Liberals, but opposed by the Conservatives.

=== Engagement with Jewish Community ===
Mendicino was heavily engaged with the Jewish community both prior and after leaving cabinet. His riding, Eglinton-Lawrence is the Federal Electoral District with the third-largest percentage of Jewish inhabitants. As Member of Parliament, he advocated for significant funding toward Jewish community infrastructure, including securing funds for Yeshiva Yesodei HaTorah in 2018 and the Reena Foundation's community building in 2023.

As Minister of Public Safety, MP Marco Mendicino expanded the Security Infrastructure Program (SIP), allowing places of worship, including synagogues, to apply for security upgrades. Under his leadership, millions of dollars were allocated to SIP and other programs aimed at supporting the Jewish community amid a rise in hate-motivated crimes. He represented the Canadian government at the opening of the Toronto Holocaust Museum, delivering a speech on the importance of Holocaust remembrance. Former justice minister Irwin Cotler, stated that Mendicino has “been at the forefront of standing up to antisemitism and all forms of hate in a principled way.”

=== Interim Chief of Staff to Mark Carney ===
Mendicino endorsed Mark Carney in the 2025 Liberal Party of Canada leadership election and served as Carney's Chief of Staff during the 2025 federal election. Following Carney's victory, Mendicino remained as his Chief of Staff, but on an interim basis. According to the Toronto Star, Mendicino was chosen because he knew the Liberal caucus well and he had already undergone the security clearance process. The National Council of Canadian Muslims criticized this appointment, saying that Mendicino had shared online posts from Meir Weinstein, the former national director of the Jewish Defense League in Canada. Mendicino resigned from his seat in the House of Commons upon assuming office. He was succeeded by Marc-André Blanchard, who was selected on June 1, 2025.

== Electoral record ==
2021 Canadian federal election: Eglinton—Lawrence
Party	Candidate	Votes	%	±%	Expenditures
Liberal	Marco Mendicino	24,051	48.5	-4.8	$95,507.96
Conservative	Geoff Pollock	18,082	36.4	+3.3	$100,748.76
New Democratic	Caleb Senneker	4,543	9.2	+0.7	$9,675.61
Green	Eric Frydman	1,490	3.0	-1.1	$1,195.38
People's	Timothy Gleeson	1,445	2.9	+1.9	$3,802.06
Total valid votes/expense limit		49,611	99.0	–	$111,049.10
Total rejected ballots		479	1.0		
Turnout		50,090	61.8		
Eligible voters		81,060			
Liberal hold		Swing		-4.1	
Source: Elections Canada

2019 Canadian federal election: Eglinton—Lawrence
Party	Candidate	Votes	%	±%	Expenditures
Liberal	Marco Mendicino	29,850	53.3	+4.41	$86,046.25
Conservative	Chani Aryeh-Bain	18,549	33.1	-10.14	$71,631.04
New Democratic	Alexandra Nash	4,741	8.5	+2.12	$10,049.32
Green	Reuben DeBoer	2,278	4.1	+3.27	$3,248.70
People's	Michael Staffieri	586	1.0	-	$5,424.02
Total valid votes/expense limit		56,004	100.0		
Total rejected ballots		394			
Turnout		56,398			
Eligible voters		82,811			
Liberal hold		Swing		+4.41	
Source: Elections Canada

2015 Canadian federal election: Eglinton—Lawrence
Party	Candidate	Votes	%	±%	Expenditures
Liberal	Marco Mendicino	27,278	48.89	+10.47	$155,849.60
Conservative	Joe Oliver	23,788	42.64	-4.18	$183,256.52
New Democratic	Andrew Thomson	3,505	6.28	-5.32	$114,205.95
Green	Matthew Chisholm	799	1.43	-1.74	$217.60
Libertarian	Ethan Buchman	308	0.55	–	–
Animal Alliance	Rudy Brunell Solomonvici	114	0.20	–	$5,129.72
Total valid votes/expense limit		55,792	100.00		$210,250.86
Total rejected ballots		328	0.58		
Turnout		56,120	72.45		
Eligible voters		77,463			
Liberal gain from Conservative		Swing		+7.32	
Source: Elections Canada
