= Nigel S. Wright =

Canadian executive and political staffer (1963–2025)

13th Chief of Staff to the Prime Minister
- In office January 1, 2011 – May 19, 2013
- Prime Minister: Stephen Harper
- Preceded by: Guy Giorno
- Succeeded by: Ray Novak

Personal details
- Born: Nigel Stewart Wright; May 18, 1963 Hamilton, Ontario, Canada
- Died: September 30, 2025 (aged 62) London, England
- Party: Conservative
- Other political affiliations: Canadian Alliance; Progressive Conservative
- Education: University of Toronto (BA, LLB); Harvard University (LLM)
- Occupation: Lawyer, business executive

Nigel Stewart Wright (May 18, 1963 – September 30, 2025) was a Canadian businessman, lawyer, and political aide. He served as the thirteenth chief of staff to the Prime Minister of Canada, from September 2010 to May 2013, and was a senior managing director in the London office of Onex Corporation. Wright left the prime minister's office after it was reported that he had used his own money to permit senator Mike Duffy to repay the government for housing expenses that were the subject of media and political controversy.

== Early life ==
Nigel Stewart Wright was born in Hamilton, Ontario, on May 18, 1963. He was adopted, and raised by parents to work hard since they were not wealthy. Wright was the son of an engineering technician, raised in Burlington, and spent some time growing up in England. He graduated from the University of Toronto's Trinity College, where his classmates included Jim Balsillie, Malcolm Gladwell, Tony Clement, Andrew Coyne, and author and political strategist John Duffy. At college, Wright was a campus activist for Brian Mulroney and co-founded The University of Toronto Magazine; as editor, he emerged as an admirer of Margaret Thatcher. Wright went on to earn an LLB with honours at the University of Toronto Law School in 1988 and an LLM at Harvard Law School.

Described by peers as a reclusive yet diligent, he ran half-marathons every morning for decades. John Duffy commented, "back in the day, the question was 'Will Nigel be on the Supreme Court or be prime minister?' He worked harder than anybody and he was pretty much the smartest guy in the room". Robert Prichard, chair of Torys LLP and former head of University of Toronto's law school, called Wright "among the very best and brightest of his generation."

== Personal faith ==
As a young man, Wright contemplated joining the Anglican priesthood. According to journalist Geoff Stevens, people who knew Wright from his work at St. Thomas's Anglican Church say he was "a straight arrow, honourable and committed to public service".

Wright served as sub-deacon and warden of the Anglican Church of Canada, and was a proponent of the Anglo-Catholic movement, which asserts the Catholic roots of Anglicanism. During his time as a subdeacon at St. Thomas's Anglican Church, he was granted semi-private audiences with Pope Benedict XVI, and his predecessor, John Paul II. He accompanied a group led by Father Raymond J. de Souza, Roman Catholic chaplain at Queen's University, on a tour of holy sites in Israel.

== Early years in politics ==
In 1984, Wright was asked by prime minister Brian Mulroney to go on hiatus from the University of Toronto Faculty of Law and work for Charley McMillan, his senior policy adviser. Wright took the job, and after returning to graduate from Toronto Law and then earning a Master of Laws from Harvard Law School, he returned to work as policy coordinator for Mulroney before Kim Campbell became prime minister.

== Charitable work ==
Wright committed his time to three major charities: LOFT Community Services, which provides housing for people in need; Out of the Cold, a multi-denominational program for the homeless; and Campfire Circle (formerly Camp Oochigeas), a Muskoka facility that supports children with cancer. As board chair, Wright spearheaded a major fundraising campaign. He sat on an advisory committee, and volunteered a week of his summer vacation every year to work with children on the site. He also sat on the board of the Mastercard Foundation, which funnels millions of dollars into micro-financing ventures in the developing world.

During his work in the prime minister's office, Wright pulled back from active participation but was known to have asked staff members who travel to collect shampoo bottles provided by hotels for use in a women's shelter.

== Career ==
=== Law ===
Wright worked at Davies Ward Phillips & Vineberg for several years, attaining the status of non-equity partner with the firm.

=== Business ===
While Wright was working on an acquisition deal for Onex Corporation he impressed chief executive officer Gerry Schwartz who took him under his wing. At Onex, Canada's largest private-sector employer, Wright received several promotions, finally becoming a managing director. At Onex he served on several subsidiary boards:

- a director of Indigo Books & Music from 2001 to April 1, 2006.
- vice president of Spirit Holdings from December 2004 to November 2006 and its Secretary and Treasurer from December 2004 to June 2006.
- a director of Spirit Holdings in February 2005.
- a director of Res-Care from June 2004 to November 7, 2006.
- an executive officer of Magnatrax Corporation.
- a director of Hawker Beechcraft, the direct parent company of Hawker Beechcraft Acquisition Company LLC from March 2007 to October 22, 2010.
- a vice president of Spirit AeroSystems and named a director in February 2005.

Wright rejoined Onex in July 2014 as a managing director in the buyout firm's offices in London, England.

== Politics ==
Involved in conservative politics from his days in college, Wright gravitated between the Progressive Conservative and Reform parties for years, trying to draft Stephen Harper to unite the then-divided right-wing forces. He was eventually successful and became a founding director of the Conservative Fund Canada, the party's financial arm, and a director of Preston Manning's think tank, the Manning Centre in Calgary. In 2010, Wright was drafted by Stephen Harper to replace Guy Giorno as his chief of staff. In accepting the position, Wright left behind a seven-figure salary for a job described by Derek Burney as "exhilarating but more strenuous than anything else I did in the public or private sector". The appointment attracted pointed criticism and questions about his ties to Bay Street; many in the opposition feared that he was too close to the private sector. During his appointment hearing, New Democratic Party MP Pat Martin told him that "every move you make, every breath you take puts you in a conflict of interest." Before starting the job, he had to negotiate with the ethics commissioner an "ethical wall" designed to insulate him from his holdings and other interests.

=== Chief of staff ===
As prime minister Harper's chief of staff, Wright became one of the most powerful players in Ottawa. He led many of Harper's priorities, from the negotiation of skills training arrangement with the provinces to drafting the policy that limits foreign investment by state-owned enterprises in the oil sands. He took over the trans-Pacific trade file from minister Ed Fast.

Wright disclosed in writing to investigators that during his time in the prime minister's office, he did not file a single expense claim, paying all his flights, hotels, meals and other costs from his own pocket. Investigators were told that it cost him tens of thousands of dollars but, thanks to his corporate career, he could afford it and that Wright held the belief that taxpayers should not bear the cost of his position if he was able legitimately to fund it himself.

In the Hill Times annual ranking of the top 100 Most Influential People in Government and Politics, Wright placed sixth in 2012. In Maclean's 25 Most important People in Ottawa, he placed fifth in 2012.

=== Senate expense scandal ===
Wright wrote a personal cheque of $90,172 to senator Mike Duffy, so that he could repay the cost of residency expenses. At the time, Duffy was under intense media pressure over these expenses. A Conservative Party spokesperson confirmed the money was a gift from Wright, with no expectation of repayment. The ethics commissioner confirmed that the office was investigating Wright for his repayment of these expenses. Wright then left government service. On October 28, 2013, Harper stated in an interview that Wright did not resign, but was in fact dismissed.

On April 15, 2014, the RCMP dropped its nearly year-long investigation into Wright, saying "the evidence gathered does not support criminal charges against Mr. Wright." The RCMP would later lay 31 charges on Duffy on July 17, 2014.; Duffy was exonerated of all 31 charges on April 21, 2016, and Wright's actions were condemned by justice Charles Vaillancourt as "mindboggling and shocking [...] in the context of a democratic society".

== Death ==
Wright died of heart failure at home in London, England, on September 30, 2025, at age 62.
