= Peggy Butts =

Canadian politician

The Honourable Peggy Butts

Senator for Nova Scotia
- In office September 22, 1997 – August 15, 1999
- Nominated by: Jean Chretien
- Appointed by: Roméo LeBlanc

Personal details
- Born: August 15, 1924
- Died: March 6, 2004 (aged 79)
- Party: Liberal Party of Canada
- Relations: Gerald Butts (nephew)
- Education: University of Ottawa (MA); University of Toronto (PhD)
- Profession: Social activist, educator, nun

Mary Alice "Peggy" Butts (August 15, 1924 – March 6, 2004) was a Canadian politician who represented Nova Scotia in the Senate from 1997 to 1999.

== Early life and education ==
Born in Glace Bay, Nova Scotia, on the Feast of the Assumption, Peggy was a Roman Catholic religious sister in the Sisters of Notre Dame congregation. She obtained several degrees, including two bachelor's degrees in philosophy and education, a master's degree in political philosophy from the University of Ottawa, and a PhD in political philosophy from the University of Toronto. Through her life she served as a schoolteacher and high school principal. Later she was a professor at St. Francis Xavier University and the University College of Cape Breton (now Cape Breton University).

== Political career ==
At the age of 73, Peggy was appointed to the Senate. However, qualification laws for senators caused problems with her appointment. All Canadian senators are required to possess land worth at least $4,000 in the province for which he or she is appointed, as well as own real and personal property worth at least $4,000, above his or her debts and liabilities. Having taken a vow of poverty upon becoming a nun, Butts was able to officially be sworn in only after her order formally transferred a small parcel of land to her name. Butts resigned at the age of 75 as required by law, and for her two years of service donated her entire salary to charity.

== Personal life ==
She had a strong influence on her nephew Gerald Butts, principal secretary to both Ontario Premier Dalton McGuinty and Canadian prime minister Justin Trudeau.

Peggy Butts died in Sydney, Nova Scotia at age 79 in 2004.

== Awards ==
Butts received the Weiler Award in 1995 in recognition of her contributions to community and social development in Canada, and was awarded an honorary degree from St. Francis Xavier University in 1996.

She received the Queen Elizabeth II Golden Jubilee Medal in 2002.
