= Arnold Heeney =

Canadian politician

Arnold Heeney CC QC
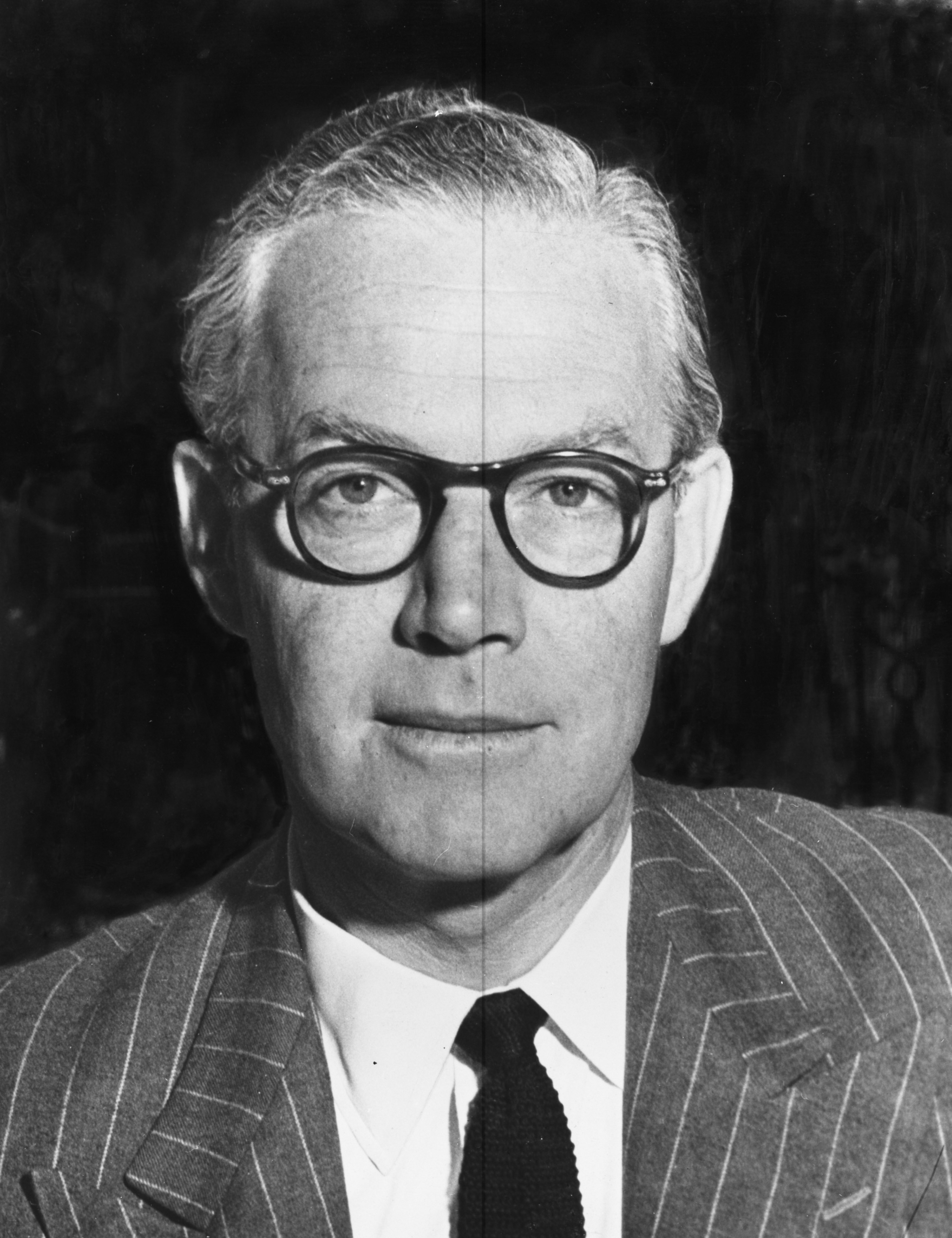

Personal details
- Born: Arnold Danford Patrick Heeney; April 5, 1902 Montreal, Quebec, Canada
- Died: December 20, 1970 (aged 68) Ottawa, Ontario, Canada
- Education: University of Manitoba; St John's College, Oxford; McGill University
- Occupation: Civil servant; diplomat

Arnold Danford Patrick Heeney CC QC (April 5, 1902 – December 20, 1970) was a Canadian lawyer, diplomat and civil servant.

He was born in Montreal, Quebec. He was educated at St. John's College, Winnipeg and received a Bachelor of Arts degree in 1921 and a Master of Arts degree in 1923 both from the University of Manitoba. As the Manitoba Rhodes Scholar he went on to St. John's College, Oxford before returning to Canada, earning a Bachelor of Civil Law degree at McGill University.

Specializing in Maritime law, in 1929 he joined the Montreal law firm of Meredith, Holden, Heward & Holden. In one of his last cases with the firm, he successfully represented F. R. Scott against the City of Westmount.

In 1938, he took the position of Principal Secretary to Prime Minister William Lyon Mackenzie King. From 1940 to 1949, he was Clerk of the Privy Council and Secretary to the Cabinet. He was perhaps the most important civil servant during World War II.

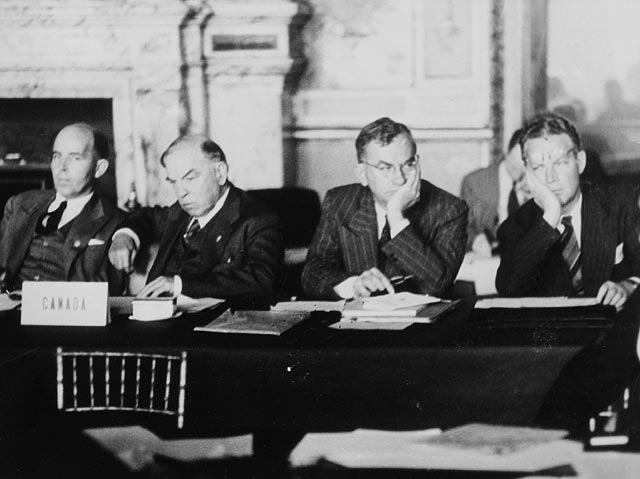
Arnold Heeney and colleagues at the Paris Peace Conference, Palais du Luxembourg. (L.-r.:) Norman Robertson, Rt. Hon. W.L. Mackenzie King, Hon. Brooke Claxton, Arnold Heeney

In 1949, he became Under Secretary of State for External Affairs, then Ambassador to the North Atlantic Treaty Organization. He was Canada's Ambassador to the United States from 1953 to 1957 and 1959 to 1962.

In 1968, he was made a Companion of the Order of Canada. He died in Ottawa in 1970.
