= Derek Burney =

Canadian diplomat

Derek Burney OC
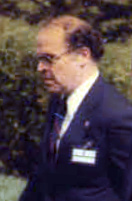
- Derek Burney pictured in 1981

Canadian Ambassador to the United States
- In office 1989–1993
- Prime Minister: Brian Mulroney
- Preceded by: Allan Gotlieb
- Succeeded by: John de Chastelain

1st Chief of Staff to the Prime Minister
- In office 1987–1989
- Prime Minister: Brian Mulroney
- Preceded by: Office established
- Succeeded by: Stanley Hartt

Personal details
- Born: 1 November 1939 (age 87) Fort William, Ontario
- Party: Progressive Conservative
- Spouse: Twila Joan Peden (m. 1962)
- Relatives: Derek Jr. (son)
- Education: Queen's University (BA, 1962; MA, 1964)

Derek Hudson Burney (born 1 November 1939) is a former career diplomat who served as Canadian ambassador to the US from 1989 to 1993. He was a political strategist for both the government of Brian Mulroney and of Stephen Harper. After exiting public service, Burney served in various executive roles in private industry. He was Chancellor of Lakehead University from 2013 to 2017.

== Early life ==
Burney was born in Fort William, Ontario (now known as Thunder Bay) to George William Burney (1886–1951) of Westville, Nova Scotia, and Annie Mary MacKay (1906–1995), who was born in Durban, South Africa but grew up on the Isle of Lewis in the Scottish Hebrides.

Burney attended Fort William Collegiate Institute. He then went on to study at Queen's University, where he received his B.A. degree in 1962, followed by his M.A. degree in 1964.

== Career ==
=== In the civil service ===
Upon graduation, Burney entered the federal public service and the Canadian diplomatic corps, subsequently serving in Japan and, as Ambassador, in Korea. From 1987 to 1989 he served as Chief of Staff to Prime Minister Brian Mulroney.

After leaving the post of Chief of Staff in 1989, Burney became Canada's Ambassador to the United States. He would serve in this position until 1993.

=== In private industry ===
Burney was then hired by Bell Canada and worked as Chairman and CEO of Bell Canada International Inc. from 1993 to 1999. He then moved to CAE Inc., serving as President and CEO until 2004. The boards of directors on which Burney has sat or now sits include CanWest Global Communications (which went bankrupt), Quebecor World Inc., Shell Canada and TransCanada Corp. He is currently the president of the board of New Brunswick Power and serves on the advisory board of Paradigm Capital.

On January 24, 2006, newly elected Prime Minister Stephen Harper announced that Burney would play a key role in the transfer of power from Paul Martin's Liberals to Harper's Conservatives.

=== As an academic ===
Burney taught at the Norman Paterson School of International Affairs at Carleton University.

On January 24, 2013, Lakehead University announced that Burney would become its 8th Chancellor. Burney served as chancellor of Lakehead University until 2017.

=== Later life ===
In later life, Burney began contributing his opinions in the national media. On 6 May 2020, he asked for a "full post-mortem" and specifically asked about the state of readiness of Canada before the pandemic began. He wanted to know whether the Chinese government concealed evidence of the outbreak in late 2019, and suggested an investigation of whether the WHO was complicit. He worried about the insolvency that waits next to the subsidy, and said there were "more people riding in the wagon than pulling it". On 14 May, he castigated the Trudeau government over its conduct of relations with China: "The litany of apologies and obsequiousness by Canada is one that only a lickspittle would salute."

== Family ==
Burney's son Derek Burney Jr. was the president of Corel Corporation for several years and later worked for Microsoft before retiring in 2021. Another son, Ian Burney, is a Canadian diplomat, serving as Ambassador to Japan from 2016 to 2021.

== Honours ==
Burney was named an Officer of the Order of Canada in 1993, and has been conferred honorary Doctor of Laws degrees from Lakehead University, Queen's University, Carleton University, and Wilfrid Laurier University.

Burney has a street named after him in his home town of Thunder Bay. Derek Burney Drive is home to the Confederation College Aviation Centre of Excellence, Ornge hangar and Levaero Aviation.

== Notes ==
Political offices
Preceded by None (see Principal Secretary of the PMO)	Chief of Staff of the Prime Minister's Office; 1987-1989	Succeeded by Stanley Hartt
