= Ian Brodie =

Canadian political aide and political scientist (born 1967)

11th Chief of Staff to the Prime Minister
- In office February 6, 2006 – July 1, 2008
- Prime Minister: Stephen Harper
- Preceded by: Tim Murphy
- Succeeded by: Guy Giorno

Chief of Staff to the Leader of the Official Opposition
- In office August 2005 – February 2006
- Leader: Stephen Harper

Executive Director of the Conservative Party of Canada
- In office 2004–2005

Personal details
- Born: Ian Ross Brodie; July 25, 1967 (age 59) Toronto, Ontario, Canada
- Party: Conservative
- Education: McGill University; University of Calgary
- Profession: Political scientist

Ian Ross Brodie (born July 25, 1967) is a Canadian political scientist and was Chief of Staff in Stephen Harper's Prime Minister's Office from Harper's ascension to the position of prime minister until July 1, 2008. The news that he was leaving the post came days before the release of a report on the Clinton/Obama NAFTA leak controversy. He is currently a professor in the Department of Political Science at the University of Calgary.

== Early life and education ==
Brodie attended high school at the University of Toronto Schools. He earned a BA in political science from McGill University in Montreal, and an MA and a PhD from the University of Calgary.

In 1997, he became assistant professor of political science at the University of Western Ontario in London; promotion to tenured associate professor came in 2002. At Western, he specialized in Canadian politics, particularly Canadian conservative politics and law and politics.

His book Friends of the Court: The Privileging of Interest Group Litigants in Canada (State University of New York Press, 2002), a revision of his doctoral dissertation, discussed the treatment of interest groups seeking leave to intervene before the Supreme Court of Canada. Friends posited that the court had come to favor a preferred set of interest groups, and explored the legal theory by which this had come about.

== Political career ==
In 2003, he took leave from Western to become assistant to the chief of staff in the office of the federal leader of the opposition, first under Harper when he led the Canadian Alliance, then under Grant Hill's interim parliamentary leadership in 2004.

When Harper became leader of the successor Conservative Party of Canada, he appointed Brodie its executive director. In August 2005 he appointed Brodie his chief of staff. When Harper became prime minister after the 2006 election, Brodie became PMO chief of staff.

His book At the Centre of Government (McGill-Queen's University Press, 2018) is based in part on his experiences with Harper.
