= Office of the Prime Minister and Privy Council =

Office building in Ottawa

Coordinates: 45°25′25.23″N 75°41′49.42″W

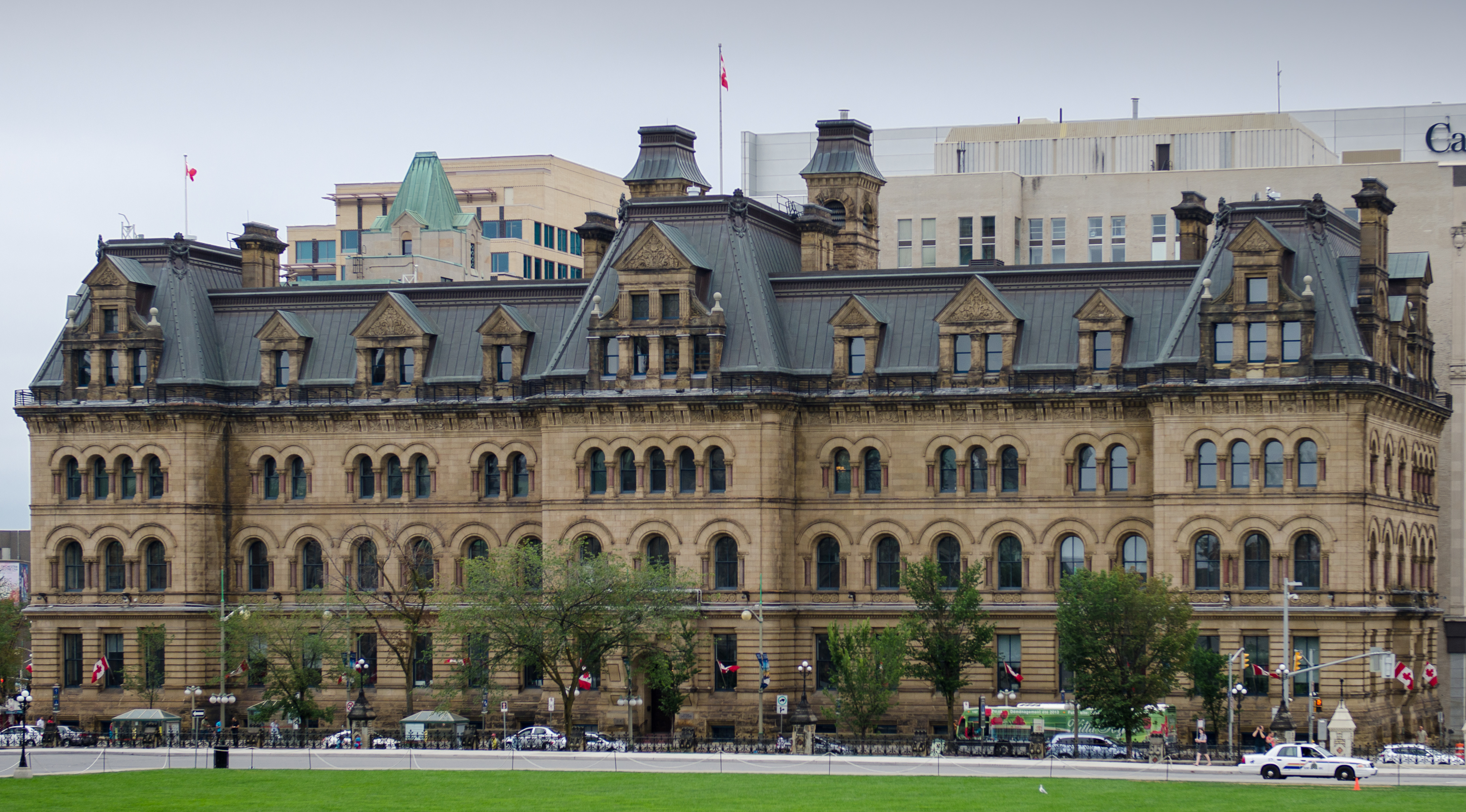
- The building seen from Wellington Street in 2010
- Interactive map of the Office of the Prime Minister and Privy Council area
- Former names: Southwest Departmental Building, Langevin Block

General information
- Type: Office building
- Architectural style: Second Empire
- Location: 80 Wellington Street, Ottawa, Ontario, Canada
- Current tenants: Office of the Prime Minister; Privy Council Office
- Construction started: 1883
- Completed: 1889
- Owner: The King in Right of Canada
- Landlord: National Capital Commission

Design and construction
- Architect: Thomas Fuller
- Designations: Classified Federal Heritage Building

National Historic Site of Canada
- Official name: Langevin Block National Historic Site of Canada
- Part of: Confederation Square National Historic Site of Canada

The Office of the Prime Minister and Privy Council (French: Bureau du Premier ministre et du Conseil privé) building, formerly known as the Langevin Block (French: Édifice Langevin, IPA: [lɑ̃ʒvɛ̃]), is an office building facing Parliament Hill in Ottawa, Ontario, Canada. As the home of the Privy Council Office and Office of the Prime Minister, it is the working headquarters of the executive branch of the Canadian government.

The term Langevin Block was previously used as a metonym for the Prime Minister's Office and the Privy Council Office. The building was named after Father of Confederation and cabinet minister Hector-Louis Langevin. Recognizing Langevin's role in establishing the residential school system, associated with the abuse of Indigenous children and attempts to forcibly assimilate them, Prime Minister Justin Trudeau announced the renaming of the building on June 21, 2017.

The building is a National Historic Site of Canada.

== Description ==
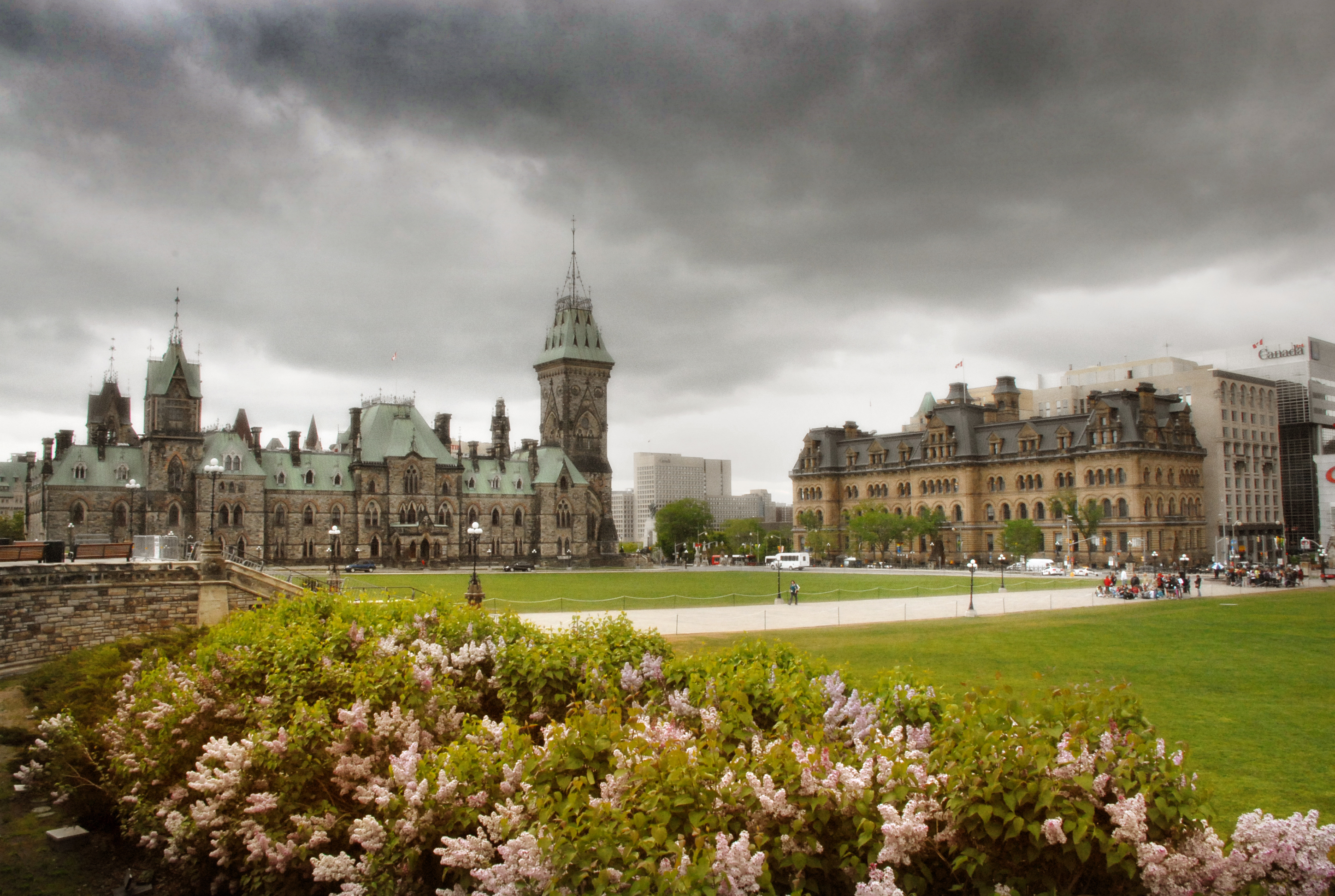
The East Block and the PMO Office building as seen from the grounds of Parliament Hill

It is built of sandstone obtained from a New Brunswick quarry owned by Charles Elijah Fish. It occupies a prominent place on Ottawa's Wellington Street, adjacent to the National War Memorial, Chateau Laurier, Government Conference Centre, Rideau Canal, National Arts Centre, High Commission of the United Kingdom in Ottawa, and the Sparks Street Mall.

The structure is distinctive in Ottawa for its Second Empire Style design because most government buildings from the period were built in the Gothic Revival style. It was designed by the Chief Dominion Architect Thomas Fuller, who also designed the original Parliament Buildings. In 2000, it was named by the Royal Architectural Institute of Canada as one of the top 500 buildings produced in Canada during the last millennium. The building is connected by a bridge to an office building at 13 Metcalfe Street.

While the offices of senior Privy Council Office officials remain in the building, its use is now largely limited to the Prime Minister's Office, in addition to his or her office in the Centre Block of the Parliament Buildings. The Prime Minister of Canada has two office rooms.

== History ==
Started in 1883 and completed in 1889, the building was the first federal government office building constructed outside the Parliament Hill precinct. Originally named the Southwest Departmental Building during construction, its name from completion until 2017 came from Sir Hector-Louis Langevin, the Minister of Public Works in the Cabinet of Sir John A. Macdonald.

The building was first used by the departments of Agriculture, Interior, Indian Affairs and the Post Office. It was used by the Department of Indian Affairs until 1965. The building was renovated between 1975 and 1977 and has been used since by the Prime Minister's Office and the Privy Council.

In 1977, it was designated a National Historic Site. This was to recognize Fuller's work, its example as a Department of Public Works architecture, and its Second Empire style.

In 2017, the Assembly of First Nations called for the building to be renamed, largely based on Langevin's role in the creation of Canada's controversial Indian residential schools system. On June 21, 2017, the building was renamed the Office of the Prime Minister and Privy Council.

== See also ==
- List of designated heritage properties in Ottawa

== Additional reading ==
- Kalman, Harold; Roaf, John (1983). Exploring Ottawa: an architectural guide to the nation's capital. Toronto: University of Toronto Press. p. 8. ISBN 978-0-8020-6395-3.
- Ottawa: a guide to heritage structures. City of Ottawa, Local Architectural Conservation Advisory Committee. 2001. ISBN 978-0-9686-5071-4.
