= Gerald Butts =

Canadian political consultant (born 1971)

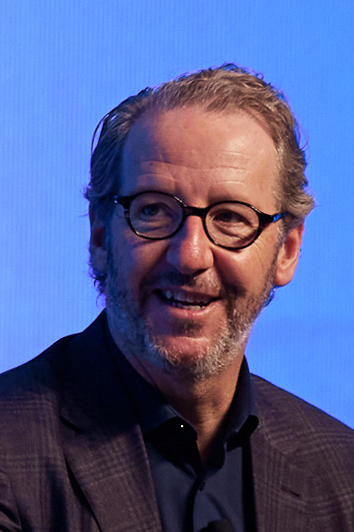
- Butts in 2023

Principal Secretary to the Prime Minister of Canada
- In office November 4, 2015 – February 18, 2019
- Prime Minister: Justin Trudeau
- Preceded by: Ray Novak
- Succeeded by: Tom Pitfield (2025)

President and Chief Executive Officer of the World Wildlife Fund Canada
- In office September 1, 2008 – October 31, 2012
- Preceded by: Michael Russill
- Succeeded by: David Miller

Principal Secretary to the Premier of Ontario
- In office 2003 – August 30, 2008
- Premier: Dalton McGuinty

Personal details
- Born: Gerald Michael Butts; July 8, 1971 (age 55) Glace Bay, Nova Scotia, Canada
- Spouse: Jodi (Heimpel) Butts
- Children: 2
- Education: McGill University (BA, MA); York University
- Occupation: Activist, consultant

Gerald Michael Butts (born July 8, 1971) is a Canadian executive and policy advisor to governments and political leaders. He is vice chairman and senior advisor at Eurasia Group and a Board Member of the World Wildlife Fund. He served as the Principal Secretary to Prime Minister Justin Trudeau from November 4, 2015 until his resignation on February 18, 2019. From 2008 to 2012, he was president and CEO of the World Wildlife Fund Canada, part of a global conservation organization. In 2014, Maclean's magazine declared Butts to be the fourteenth most powerful Canadian. As the former Principal Secretary to Prime Minister Justin Trudeau, Butts was praised as the architect behind the Liberal Party of Canada platform that led to its victory in October 2015 and was one of the most senior staffers in the Office of the Prime Minister.

Born in Glace Bay, Nova Scotia, with three older brothers and one older sister, he is the son of Charles William "Charlie" Butts, a coal miner who was 56 years old when Butts was born and retired when Butts was 6 years old, and Rita Monica (Yorke) Butts, a nurse and a first-generation Canadian daughter of a Ukrainian father and a Polish mother. He attended Bridgeport School (now closed) and then St. Michael's High School (now closed).

He received a B.A. and M.A. in English literature from McGill University in Montreal, Quebec. It was at McGill that he was introduced to Justin Trudeau by a mutual friend. There, he was also elected president of the Canadian University Society for Intercollegiate Debate and won the national debating championships two years in a row. He briefly attended York University to pursue a Ph.D.

== Career ==
Upon graduating from McGill University, his first job was working as a research assistant in the Senate office of Allan MacEachen. There, he helped organize MacEachen's past correspondence for the purposes of his intended memoirs (which in the event were never written).

In 1999, Butts became a policy director within the Government of Ontario. He was the policy secretary, and later the principal secretary, in the office of the then premier of Ontario, Dalton McGuinty, in Toronto. Prior to the 2007 election, Butts was a McGuinty insider. After the election, he became McGuinty's principal adviser. As one of his biographical notes describes it, Butts "was intimately involved in all of the government’s significant environmental initiatives, from the Greenbelt and Boreal Conservation plan to the coal phase-out and toxic reduction strategy".

Butts had previously worked with Senator Allan MacEachen and with George Smitherman.

Butts advised the campaigns that led to the Ontario Liberal Party's election victories in 2003 and 2007.

On June 25, 2008, Butts was announced as the president and CEO of the World Wildlife Fund Canada. He officially took up the position on September 2, 2008, succeeding Mike Russill.

On October 16, 2012, Butts left WWF Canada to become the political advisor to Justin Trudeau. His position at WWF Canada was filled by David Miller, a former mayor of Toronto.

On December 13, 2012, Butts was interviewed by Steve Paikin for The Agenda on the topic of "The Best Way to Clean Up the Environment". Butts has published articles in the Boston Book Review, the Literary Review of Canada, and Gravitas. He has also appeared on television programs such as W5 and TSN's Off the Record.

=== 2015 Canadian election and premiership of Justin Trudeau ===
If the Liberals were to win the 2015 election, Gerald Butts could become one of the most powerful people in Canada.

— Lee Berthiaume

... it's hard to picture Trudeau running for prime minister without [Gerald Butts].

— A fellow political aide

In 2012, stemming from a two-decade-long friendship, Butts became the senior political adviser to Justin Trudeau and one of the few people with whom Trudeau consulted regularly. During Trudeau's initial time as Liberal Party leader. He also assisted on the vast majority of policies on which Trudeau campaigned. He was appointed Principal Secretary to the Prime Minister on November 4, 2015.

On September 21, 2016, The Globe and Mail reported that Butts had charged moving expenses to Canadian taxpayers in the amount of $126,669.56 to relocate his residence from Toronto to Ottawa. These expenses included a personalized cash payout of $20,799.10. After it was revealed publicly, Butts agreed to repay $41,618.62.

On February 18, 2019, Butts stepped down as Trudeau's principal secretary and stated that it was to defend himself from allegations made against him in relation to the SNC-Lavalin affair and to avoid drawing attention away from the prime minister's work. In a statement released on Twitter, Butts denied influencing the Attorney General and noted that he specifically recruited Jody Wilson-Raybould to join the Liberal Party of Canada and was an avid supporter during both her candidacy and her tenure as a minister. Butts reiterated these claims in testimony to the House Judiciary Committee on March 6, 2019. At the time of Butts' resignation, Trudeau had responded by thanking him for his service, while acknowledging the integrity, guidance, and devotion that Butts had provided him. In July 2019, Prime Minister Trudeau hired Butts back to play a key role in the Liberal 2019 election campaign.

Between January 2017 and February 2024, Butts' Eurasia Group received over $1.5 million in contracts from the Government of Canada for consulting and geopolitical research.

Since 2025, Butts has served as an informal advisor to Prime Minister Mark Carney.

== Personal life ==
Butts is the nephew of the former Canadian senator Mary Alice "Peggy" Butts, whom he cites as a major influence on him.

He is married to Jodi (Heimpel) Butts, a lawyer, and they have two children, Aidan Ignatius (born May 6, 2006) and Ava Augusta (born December 1, 2007). They resided in Toronto for 13 years until the family relocated in the summer of 2016 to Ottawa. Butts currently resides at Champlain Park area of Westboro, Ottawa.
