= Marc-André Blanchard =

Canadian lawyer and diplomat

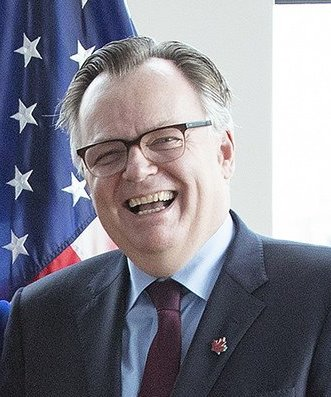

17th Chief of Staff to the Prime Minister
- Incumbent
- Assumed office July 7, 2025
- Prime Minister: Mark Carney
- Deputy: Braeden Caley; Andrée-Lyne Hallé; Tim Krupa; Jennifer McIntyre
- Preceded by: Marco Mendicino

24th Canadian Ambassador to the United Nations
- In office April 1, 2016 – July 31, 2020
- Monarch: Elizabeth II
- Prime Minister: Justin Trudeau
- Preceded by: Guillermo Rishchynski
- Succeeded by: Bob Rae

President of the Quebec Liberal Party
- In office 2000–2008
- Leader: Jean Charest

Personal details
- Born: November 10, 1965 (age 60)
- Party: Quebec Liberal; Liberal
- Occupation: Diplomat
- Profession: Lawyer

Marc-André Blanchard CM (born November 10, 1965) is a Canadian executive, lawyer and former diplomat. He served as Permanent Representative of Canada to the United Nations, from April 1, 2016 until July 31, 2020. In June 2025, Prime Minister Mark Carney announced Blanchard as his new Chief of Staff starting in July.

== Early life and education ==
Blanchard is a graduate of Collège Jean-de-Brébeuf, the Université de Montréal, the London School of Economics and Columbia University.

== Career ==
Prior to his appointment to the United Nations, Blanchard was chairman and CEO of McCarthy Tétrault, one of Canada's largest law firms, and was president of the Quebec Liberal Party from 2000 to 2008. He served on Justin Trudeau's transition team following the 2015 election.

In 2013, Blanchard was named among the 25 most influential lawyers in Canada by Canadian Lawyer Magazine, and Catalyst Canada awarded him the CEO Recognition Award for his leadership in gender diversity.

In 2016, Blanchard was nominated to represent Trudeau's foreign policy at the United Nations as Permanent Representative of Canada. That same year, Blanchard was awarded Advocatus Emeritus by the Quebec Bar Association.

In 2017, he was named as a member of Canada's North American Free Trade Agreement (NAFTA) Council. On May 3, 2018 he was named as Canada's Representative to the Ismaili Imamat, an announcement coinciding with the Canadian Diamond Jubilee visit of the Aga Khan. Blanchard retired from his diplomatic postings on July 31, 2020, shortly after Canada lost the 2020 United Nations Security Council election.

Effective September 8, 2020, he is an executive vice-president of pension fund manager Caisse de dépôt et placement du Québec in charge of its CDPQ Global division, with responsibility for the United States/Latin America, Europe and Asia/Pacific.

=== Chief of Staff to the Prime Minister ===
On June 1, 2025, Prime Minister Mark Carney selected Blanchard as his Chief of Staff. Along with Dominic LeBlanc and Janice Charette, Blanchard was part of the Canadian negotiating team in the August 2026 collapsed trade talks between the US and Canada.
