= Estimates =

Outline of government spending

In the Westminster system of government, the Estimates are an outline of government spending for the following fiscal year presented by the cabinet to parliament. The Estimates are drawn up by bureaucrats in the finance ministry in collaboration with cabinet ministers. They consist of detailed reports on how each department or ministry will spend its money. The estimates are normally introduced in the responsible chamber (the lower house in bicameral parliaments) just prior to the main Budget Day, which gives them time to be analyzed by House committees. Unlike the budget, the estimates contain no references to fiscal policy, long-term goals, or funding. After each section is reviewed by the relevant committee the entire Estimates are voted on as one bill. Defeat on the vote is treated as loss of supply and tantamount to loss of confidence. Unlike tax proposals in the budget, the Estimates are rarely controversial, with most issues being dealt with in committee.

Most of the countries also mandate an update or series of updates to the Estimates to account for changes in the economy or in government policy. In Canada, for instance, this update must be passed in December each year.
