= Jean Carle =

Canadian civil servant

Jean Carle CVO (born July 16, 1962) is a Canadian former civil servant, business executive and Liberal Party operative noted for his close relationship with former Prime Minister Jean Chrétien. Carle was described by Maclean's in 1998 as being so close to Chrétien as to be almost a member of the Chrétien family.

== Biography ==
Carle was born in Montreal, Quebec, the son of Robert and Gervaise (née Loignon) and was educated successively at Collège Jean-de-Brébeuf, Collège André-Grasset and the Université de Montréal. He served one of the vice-presidents of the Liberal Party in 1983–84, as president of the Quebec wing of the Young Liberals in 1984–85 and as an aide to Chrétien between 1984 and 1986. In 1984, Carle had supported John Turner against Chrétien, but when Chrétien asked him at a meeting why he had supported an Anglo against a fellow Québécois, leading a guilt-stricken Carle to defect over to the Chrétien camp. Chrétien soon grew fond of Carle, and hired him on as an assistant. On February 27, 1986, Carle attended the meeting between Chrétien and John Turner when Chrétien resigned, leading Carle to break down in tears.

Starting in 1986, Carle worked as a public affairs consultant with MediaProfile, and served as the public affairs director for BCP Advertising between 1987 and 1989. When he was short of money in the 1980s, Chrétien allowed him to live rent-free in his basement at his Ottawa house. On 7 October 1989, he married Marie Elizabeth Thorne and has two children. Starting in 1990, Carle resumed his career as Chrétien's special executive assistant following his patron's return to politics when he became leader of the Liberal Party. Carle was so close to Chrétien that he was widely seen within the Liberal Party as Chrétien's "surrogate son". When Chrétien became prime minister, he appointed Carle to be his director of operations at the Prime Minister's Office, a post that Carle held until he retired from the PMO in February 1998.

As the director of operations at the PMO Carle was described as very efficient to the point that one Liberal complained that Carle gave the impression that he was working in a dictatorship rather than a democracy. In 1997, Carle was named Commander of the Victorian Order by Elizabeth II. During his time at the PMO, Carle was responsible for organizing the security for the November 1997 APEC summit in Vancouver that saw the RCMP crush demonstrators protesting against human rights abuses in China and Indonesia. On 7 August 2001, a report was issued by Judge Ted Hughes, which cleared Chrétien of wrongdoing at the APEC summit, but stated that Carle had improperly pressured the RCMP to attack the protesters. Judge Hughes accused Carle of "throwing his weight around" and attempting to interfere with security arrangements. Hughes concluded that the RCMP had used excessive force that was in violation of the Charter of Rights and Freedoms as the purpose of the RCMP actions were to silence the protesters, thereby violating the freedom of speech guaranteed by the Charter.

After leaving the PMO in 1998, Carle took up a post as vice-president responsible for corporate affairs at the Business Development Bank of Canada (BDBC). Patrick Lavelle, the chairman of the Business Development Bank, tried to block his appointment on the grounds that he was unsuitable for the post, but after a meeting with Carle's patron Chrétien, felt he had "no choice", but to accept Carle. Carle played a role in the Sponsorship scandal. Carle admitted to the Gomery Commission in 2005 that he had created a $125,000 phoney paper trail to hide a sponsorship deal while at the BDBC. Carle transferred money from the Public Works Department through the BDBC to a Montreal TV producer so that the public would not learn the federal government had spent $125,000 on the TV series Le Canada Millennaire. When Justice John Gomery asked Carle that "If this were a drug deal, it would be called money-laundering", to which Carle replied "You're not wrong". Carle argued that his actions were justified because: "I felt it was a benefit for the bank to get an extra $125,000 in advertising without having to pay its own money, I did not do this in bad faith. We were kind of a transmission belt." In September 2001, Carle became chief of operations at the Just for Laughs comedy festival in Montreal, which received a doubling of federal sponsorship money by the Public Works ministry headed by Alfonso Gagliano, and then what the journalist Lawrence Martin called a highly unusual retroactive grant of $100,000. In April 2002, Carle left his post at the Just for Laughs festival for "personal reasons".

Besides attracting controversy for his role in the sponsorship scandal, Carle was also involved in the Grand-Mère Affair. Carle was involved in the firing of François Beaudoin, president of the BDBC, in 1999 after he attempted to call in the loan to the Grand-Mère Inn. Beaudoin sued for wrongful dismissal following his sacking. In February 2004, Beaudoin won his wrongful dismissal suit against the Business Development Bank of Canada. Justice Andre Denis ruled in favor of Beaudoin's claim that he was fired for political reasons in 1999 for trying to call in the loan on the Grand-Mère Inn, ruled that Carle was guilty of making false criminal and civil charges of wrongdoing against Beaudoin to discredit him for suing the bank, accused Carle of committing perjury during the trial and declared given the "unspeakable injustice" Beaudoin had suffered, told the government not to appeal his ruling because they would be wasting taxpayers' money if they did. In March 2004, Carle was named as someone involved in the sponsorship scandal. Charles Guité claimed in 2004 that he regularly met with Carle when the latter was chief of operations at the PMO together with Jean Pelletier, Chrétien's chief of staff, to discuss what events to spend sponsorship money on, and how much. During the Gomery commission hearings in 2005, Lucienne Robillard testified that she was very surprised that Carle had been put in charge of Treasury Board policies on communication, public opinion polls and advertising, saying such a job was not normally performed by "political staff" from the PMO such as Carle. In his report on responsibility for the sponsorship scandal, Justice Gomery ruled that Guité's claim that he received his instructions from Pelletier and Carle was indeed the truth, and Carle in 1995 had helped Jean Brault of Groupaction advertising firm get in touch with Guité.
