= Timeline of the 2006 Canadian federal election =

This article provides the timeline of the 2006 Canadian federal election, which was called on November 29, 2005 when the Governor General dissolved parliament following the government's defeat in a motion of no confidence. The election was held on January 23, 2006.

== 2004 ==
- November 18, 2004 - Outspoken Liberal Party Member of Parliament (MP) Carolyn Parrish is dismissed from the Liberal caucus by Prime Minister Paul Martin for making statements critical of the Liberal Party and the prime minister. She then sat as an independent.
- December 16, 2004 - Liberal MP Lawrence D. O'Brien died of cancer. A by-election in his riding, Labrador, was called for May 24.

== 2005 ==
=== Pre-campaign ===
- February 23 - Finance Minister Ralph Goodale presented the 2005 federal budget to the House of Commons of Canada. When the Bloc Québécois and the New Democratic Party (NDP) opposed the budget, the Conservative Party caucus abstained on the vote, which was held on March 9, allowing the government to maintain confidence.
- March 31 - Testimony by Jean Brault, former president of Groupaction at the Gomery Commission was considered so damaging to the Liberals that many speculated that an election could be held soon. The details of the testimony were not publicly revealed due to a publication ban imposed by Mr. Justice Gomery.
- April 7 - Justice Gomery lifted the publication ban on much of the testimony just minutes before question period. Opposition parties launched a full assault on the government with the new evidence.
- April 11 - *An EKOS/Toronto Star poll showed the Conservatives leading the Liberals 36% to 25%. This was the first time since before the 1993 election that a party led the Liberals by more than the margin of error.
- April 13 - David Kilgour, MP, left the Liberal caucus to sit as an independent. Kilgour who was originally elected as a Progressive Conservative in the 1979 election said that he would not run as a Conservative in the next election.
- April 21 - Prime Minister Paul Martin addressed the nation at 19:02 eastern time and promised to call an election within 30 days of the final report of the Gomery Commission, due on December 15, should his government survive to that date, while outlining the steps his administration had taken to address the sponsorship scandal. Each of the three opposition party leaders responded live following Martin's taped address. The NDP's Jack Layton offered to support the government, which, with the close numbers in the House of Commons would make the survival of the government possible but not certain, if Martin agreed to remove corporate tax cuts from the budget. Opposition Leader Stephen Harper suggested an election was likely but not certain while Bloc Québécois leader Gilles Duceppe unequivocally supported an immediate election.
- April 26 - An agreement in principle between the Liberals and the NDP was reached under which tax cuts for large corporations would be deferred but those for Small and Medium-sized Enterprises (SMEs) would remain. The deferred tax cuts were to be introduced later in a separate bill, while budget surpluses would be used to fund mutual Liberal and NDP priorities such as training, post-secondary education, foreign aid, affordable housing and the environment. Under the agreement, the NDP would support the government on any confidence motions until the budget received Royal Assent.
- May 10 - The House of Commons passed, by a margin of 153 to 150, a Conservative motion that called upon the House Public Accounts committee to "recommend that the government resign because of its failure to address the deficiencies in governance of the public service". Conservative and Bloc Québécois MPs voted in favor of the motion against the Liberals, the NDP and two independent MPs. Liberal House Leader Tony Valeri maintained that the vote was not a matter of confidence while all opposition parties, including the NDP though it sided with the government on the vote, said that it was. The government lost four more similar votes over the next two days.
- May 11 - Prime Minister Martin called for a vote on the budget implementation bill on May 19, he suggested that this would be the time that the House would determine whether or not it had confidence in his government. Some constitutional experts had suggested such a move should be taken as the confidence issue was uncertain.

- May 17 - Prime Minister Martin and prominent Conservative MP and former leadership contender Belinda Stronach announced that Stronach would join the Liberal Party and become Minister of Human Resources and Skills Development. This move gave the Liberals a stronger but not certain chance of winning the confidence vote scheduled for May 19. It brought the total number of MPs committed to supporting the government on the vote to 152, with 152 opposed with two undecided.
- May 18 - British Columbia Conservative MP Gurmant Grewal alleged that he has a taped conversation with Paul Martin's Chief of Staff Tim Murphy. On the tape, Grewal and his wife Nina, also a Conservative MP, were supposedly offered patronage appointments if they abstained on "certain" votes.
- May 19 - The budget implementation bills, both matters of confidence, passed the House of Commons. The first bill, on the original budget, passed without opposition by the Conservative Party as a gesture of support for the Atlantic Accord. The second bill, which implemented the April 26 deal between the Liberal Party and the NDP, resulted in a tie vote which was broken in favor of the government by the Speaker of the House. Independent MP David Kilgour voted against the bill, and Independent MP Chuck Cadman voted in favour. This was the first time in Canadian history that the Speaker of the House broke a tie on a matter of confidence.
- May 24 - Liberal Todd Russell won a by-election held in Labrador, winning with a reduced majority. Surprisingly for a by-election, turnout was significantly increased over the 2004 general election. Although there was now one more Liberal in the House, the government still needed the support of the NDP and two of the three independents in order to survive future confidence votes. Under such circumstances, the Liberals would no longer require the Speaker to break a tie in their favour, something that the Speaker would not do on all matters of confidence, such a third reading on a budget bill.
- June 4 - Former Premier of Quebec Bernard Landry announced his surprise resignation as leader of the Parti Québécois after receiving 76% support from a leadership review at the party's convention. Speculation immediately mounted that Bloc leader Gilles Duceppe would resign from federal politics and run to replace him.
- June 6 - Ontario MP Pat O'Brien left the Liberal Party to sit as an independent, citing his disappointment with Paul Martin not keeping his promise to hold cross country hearings on same-sex marriage. Mr. O'Brien promised to do everything in his power to defeat Bill C-38 (presumably including a vote of no-confidence with the government).
- June 9 - The Supreme Court of Canada struck down a law in Quebec banning private health care.
- June 10 - An audio engineer hired by the Conservative Party stated that he could find no alterations in the final released version of the Gurmant Grewal tapes. This audio engineer was the only one to have actually examined the original tapes. There had been earlier evidence that Grewal may have altered the tapes, but this analysis was done on excerpts of the tapes, not the complete product.
- June 13 - Gilles Duceppe announced he would not run in the PQ leadership race but would instead lead the Bloc through the next federal election.
- June 23

- The House of Commons passed a motion to extend the sitting of Parliament indefinitely until such time as Bill C-38 (same-sex marriage) and Bill C-48 (Budget companion bill to implement agreement with the NDP) are passed.
- In the late evening, shortly after third reading debate began on Bill C-48, the Liberals introduced a closure motion supported by all parties but the Conservatives leading to a vote on C-48. It passed by a margin of 152-147. This was seen as a reaction to the plan by Conservatives to bring down the government over C-48 the following week. As a result, the extended session of parliament would only have to deal with C-38.

- July 9 - Chuck Cadman succumbed to cancer at age 57.
- August 12 - The Royal Canadian Mounted Police (RCMP) announced that they would not launch a criminal investigation after reviewing audio recordings made by Conservative MP Gurmant Grewal.
- August 15 - The United States said it would disregard a North American Free Trade Agreement decision ruling their tariffs on softwood lumber illegal and continue their activities, prompting Finance Minister Ralph Goodale to say that International Trade Minister Jim Peterson is considering Canada's options, which could include litigation or trade sanctions.

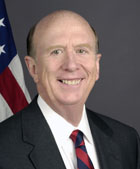
David Wilkins

- August 26 - In remarks published in The Ottawa Citizen, U.S. Ambassador to Canada David Wilkins said that Canadian leaders should stop their "emotional tirades" and get back to negotiating on trade issues. The comment immediately drew the ire of both the Liberal Government and Opposition Leader Stephen Harper.
- August 28 - Industry Minister David Emerson blasted David Wilkins over his earlier comments: "I find it a little hypocritical to hear the ambassador telling us we should be negotiating... we've been negotiating for years, The Ambassador has to realize that Canada is not going to sit back and knuckle under... Canadians have had enough."
- August 30 - The World Trade Organization ruled that the U.S. did comply with international law when it imposed duties on Canadian softwood. Jim Peterson said that the U.S. victory in the softwood lumber trade dispute was disappointing but not a crippling blow and wouldn't dramatically change Canada's position in the long-running dispute.
- September 26:
  - The House of Commons resumed business following its summer break.
  - Paul Martin announced that Revenue minister John McCallum would assume the responsibilities of Natural Resources minister John Efford, although the latter would nominally retain the title and place in cabinet. Efford, who was suffering from diabetes, planned to take time off to tend to his health. He indicated that he hoped to become well enough to resume his position in cabinet and run for re-election.
- September 27 - Michaëlle Jean was formally installed as Canada's 27th Governor General, largely without incident despite earlier questions of her husband's ties to the Quebec sovereignty movement.
- September 29 - Nova Scotia premier John Hamm announced he would retire. Speculation put Conservative Party Deputy Leader Peter MacKay as a possible candidate for the leadership of the Nova Scotia Progressive Conservative Party.
- October 6 - Paul DeVillers resigned from his post as Parliamentary Secretary to the Prime Minister. It is later revealed that this was due to Prime Minister Martin refusing to create a consolidated cabinet-level department out of Sport Canada as proposed by DeVillers in his role as parliamentary secretary. DeVillers said he would not run in the next election as a result.
- October 17 - Bev Desjarlais lost the NDP nomination in Churchill, and subsequently left the party to sit as an independent.
- October 19 - Opposition Leader Stephen Harper threatened to disrupt the House of Commons if they can enlist the New Democrats in a plan to take down the Liberal minority government. NDP Leader Jack Layton rejected the tactic, stating that he was focusing on trying to get some things done.
- October 21 - Former NDP MP Svend Robinson announced he would make an attempt at a political comeback by running against Liberal MP Hedy Fry in the riding of Vancouver Centre. Robinson did not contest the 2004 election, in his then riding of Burnaby—Douglas, after having been arrested for shoplifting.
- October 25 - NDP Leader Jack Layton met for 45 minutes with Prime Minister Paul Martin at 24 Sussex, asking for actions in some areas in exchange for continued support of the Liberal minority government. The NDP list focussed on ending the expansion of for-profit health care but also included pension protection, smog prevention, ethics and democratic reform.
- October 26 - Prime Minister Paul Martin rejected the NDP's call for a new law against private health care, but the two parties agreed to a further meeting between Health Minister Ujjal Dosanjh and NDP health critic Jean Crowder.
- October 31 - On the eve of the release of Justice John Gomery first report on the Sponsorship scandal, Health Minister Ujjal Dosanjh agreed to study the private health care restrictions demanded by the New Democrats.
- November 1 - Justice John Gomery released the first report of the Gomery Commission into the sponsorship scandal. He found several Liberal party organizers and Quebec advertising executives to be at fault for defrauding the program, but found no evidence of elected officials being aware of or directing the fraud. Gomery concluded that former Prime Minister Jean Chrétien held ultimate responsibility for the program, as it occurred under his watch, but exonerated then-finance minister Martin. Martin announced that he accepted the findings unconditionally, and referred the report to the RCMP for possible further investigation. In a news conference later that day, Chrétien vowed to challenge the report's findings through the courts, alleging bias on Gomery's part.
- November 3 - The first poll was released following Gomery's findings, showing Liberal support dropping about 10%. Speculation mounted that such numbers could motivate the opposition to move to prompt an election sooner rather than later.
- November 4 - NDP Leader Jack Layton announced he would study the Liberal government's response on private health care, even though he qualified the proposals as disappointing. The government's response was made through a four pages letter from Health Minister Ujjal Dosanjh to NDP health critic Jean Crowder.
- November 7 - NDP Leader Jack Layton rejected the Liberal proposals for health-care reform in a speech at the Toronto's Empire Club, stating: "There's no basis for our party to express confidence in this government."
- November 9:
  - Layton announced that, in order to avoid an election of the Christmas holidays and to avoid the cancellation of the First Ministers' Meeting on Aboriginal issues, he would use his opposition day motion on November 24 to propose that an election be called in early January with a vote in mid-February. Such a motion would not be binding on the government and could not guarantee the election timing contained in its language.
  - Bloc MP Stéphane Bergeron (Verchères—Les Patriotes, QC) resigned from the house to run as a Parti Québécois candidate in a coming provincial by-election.
- November 13 - Harper, Duceppe and Layton met after Martin says he would not honour Layton's motion calling for an election campaign beginning in January. They proposed that they move forward with the NDP motion but, unless the Prime Minister committed to honouring it, they would vote no confidence in the government, forcing an election call sometime in November.
- November 14 - Finance Minister Goodale tabled his fiscal update, which included a major tax cut package. The opposition denounced it as an attempt to buy votes.
- November 21 - The NDP's motion to order Martin to call an election passed with a vote of 167-129.
- November 24 - Stephen Harper introduced a motion of no confidence, seconded by Jack Layton. Harper tell the House of Commons: "This government has lost the confidence of the House of Commons and needs to be removed." The vote was deferred until November 28.
- November 28 - The motion of no confidence passed 171-133, defeating the government of the 38th Parliament, and forcing the 39th general election.

=== Campaign ===
==== November ====
- November 29 - Prime Minister Paul Martin asked Governor General Michaëlle Jean to dissolve parliament - the election date was set for January 23, 2006.
  - Conservative Leader Stephen Harper says that a Conservative Government would put forward a motion in the House of Commons on marriage that would ask MPs whether they favor the traditional definition of marriage, if there are enough votes to pass Harper says he would proceed.
- Where the leaders were:
  - Paul Martin: Rideau Hall in Ottawa and a campaign event in Ottawa
  - Stephen Harper: Ottawa, then Quebec City
  - Jack Layton: Ottawa, then Toronto
  - Gilles Duceppe: Montreal
- November 30 - Conservative MP Jason Kenney held a news conference in which he complained that Martin speechwriter Scott Feschuk had insulted ethnic minorities. Feschuk had written a note on the Liberal Party website referring to "socially awkward Omni subscribers". Kenney thought Feschuk was talking about viewers of Omni TV, a multicultural channel based in Toronto. In fact, he was actually referring to now-defunct Omni magazine, a science and technology publication long cherished by nerds.
  - A Quebec Superior Court judge lifted all restrictions imposed on Karla Homolka, saying there was not enough evidence to justify them.
- Where the leaders were:
  - Paul Martin: Montreal
  - Stephen Harper: Quebec City then Halifax
  - Jack Layton: Toronto and Hamilton, Ontario
  - Gilles Duceppe: Montreal

==== December ====
- December 1 - Conservative leader Stephen Harper announced the gradual reduction of the Goods and Services Tax to 5% if he were elected. The governing Liberals rejected the plan, saying on their website that they "believe that this approach to tax relief is the wrong one for Canadians."^{1}
- Where the leaders were:
  - Paul Martin: Cornwall, ON and Montreal, QC
  - Stephen Harper: Mississauga, ON
  - Jack Layton: Oshawa, ON
  - Gilles Duceppe: Montreal, QC
- December 2:
  - Canadian Auto Workers president Buzz Hargrove, a member of the NDP, officially endorsed Paul Martin and the Liberals.
  - Harper announced his health care platform, saying that while no private clinics would be closed, he would work with provinces to cut down wait times as public hospitals.
- December 3 - Harper promised $5 billion increase in military spending over the next five years.
- December 4 - Jim Harris, leader of the Green Party, demanded that television networks stop excluding him from the upcoming televised election debates.
- December 5:
  - Layton announced that he would neither raise nor cut taxes if elected.
  - Harper promoted his child care plan, which would give parents $1200 per child under six years of age per year.
- December 6 - Martin promised $6 billion for his proposed federal child care program.
- December 7:
  - Martin blasted the United States foreign policy, saying they do not have a "global conscience".
  - Harper announced a promise of a 1% cut in the small business income tax rate.
- December 8:
  - Martin reacted to a wave of violence in Canadian cities by proposing a total ban on handguns.
  - Conservative finance critic Monte Solberg demanded the resignation of finance minister Ralph Goodale over allegations of insider trading.
- December 9:
  - Martin met with former United States President Bill Clinton in Montreal to discuss climate change.
  - Harper announced his policy on senior citizens, including increasing the amount of pension money that is sheltered from income tax and putting a national seniors' council into place.
- December 10:
  - Harper proposed to spend $250 million on cancer research.
  - Liberal strategist Scott Reid blasted Harper's child care proposal in a television interview by saying "Don't give people 25 bucks a week to blow on beer and popcorn." He later apologised. This was considered to be the first major gaffe of the campaign.
- December 12:
  - Harper continued his plan to announce one policy initiative per day by saying that parents would receive tax breaks for children involved in amateur sports.
  - The Washington Times published a letter from Stephen Harper explaining his differences between him and George W. Bush.
- December 13:
  - Harper announced $1.8 billion more in defence spending.
  - David Wilkins, U.S. ambassador to Canada, scolded Paul Martin for his anti-U.S. stance, saying that it would threaten the relationship between the two countries.
- December 14:
  - Liberal officials released a 1997 speech by Harper that referred to Canada as "a Northern European welfare state in the worst sense of the term." Conservative officials said that most of the comments were in jest.
  - Martin refused to listen to the advice of David Wilkins on using U.S. issues in the campaign, saying he "will not be dictated to".
- December 15 - The leaders of the four major political parties gathered in Vancouver for the first of four televised debates. The leaders debated in French.
- December 16 - The four party leaders participated in the English televised debate in Vancouver.
- December 17 - A Conservative rally in Edmonton was disrupted by a grieving mother whose daughter was murdered and who wanted protection for unborn children if pregnant women die.
- December 19:
  - Martin promised to raise the capital gains tax exemption for small business owners to $750,000.
  - Harper, in a bid for soft Quebec separatist votes, proposed to give Quebec more autonomy in international issues.
- December 20:
  - Harper announced his plan to combat youth crime, while confidently predicting seat gains in Ontario.
  - Martin released his platform on agriculture, including a plan to mandate the use of renewable fuels in gasoline and diesel fuel.
- December 21:
  - Paul Martin refused a plan by the French language television network TQS to debate Gilles Duceppe over the Quebec separation issue. Stephen Harper considered taking Martin's place.
  - Harper accused Martin of wanting a Parti Québécois victory in the next Quebec provincial election so that Liberals can "stand up for federalism".
- December 22:
  - Harper promised to increase Canadian military presence in the Arctic, in response to claims by Denmark over Hans Island.
- December 23:
  - The Royal Canadian Mounted Police, at the request of NDP MP Judy Wasylycia-Leis, began an investigation into Finance Minister Ralph Goodale's handling of his November announcement of changes to the taxation of dividend income and no changes to the taxation of income trusts, over possible insider trading.
  - A picture of Harper and Duceppe talking to each other at a Holocaust memorial service, used by the Liberals to suggest the two leaders are collaborating with each other, was called "beyond tasteless" by Harper, who suggested that it may foreshadow a dirty negative campaign by the Liberals.
- All leaders stopped campaigning over the Christmas weekend.
- December 26:
  - The Liberal campaign committed another gaffe when Mike Klander, the party's Ontario vice-president, resigned after comparing Toronto NDP candidate Olivia Chow to a dog on his blog. The comment was considered offensive to the Chinese-Canadian community.
  - The murder of a young girl who was Boxing Day shopping in Toronto brought the issue of gun violence into the campaign. Harper proposed extra enforcement of existing laws, Martin re-iterated his plan to ban handguns, and Layton issued a statement condemning the shootings.
- December 27:
  - Harper announced a plan to install military bases in cities, making it easier to deploy the units during local emergencies. The Liberals later demonized this plan in controversial 2006 Harper Attack ads.
  - Layton promised to introduce a proportional representation voting system in Canada if elected.
- December 28:
  - Finance Minister Ralph Goodale refused to resign over the income trust investigation.
  - Harper proposed a veterans' bill of rights to combat perceived neglect by the Liberal government.
- December 29:
  - Harper announced that a Conservative government would give commuters tax breaks on public transit passes.
- December 31:
  - Martin said there is "no evidence of wrongdoing" in Ralph Goodale's income trust announcement.
- All leaders stopped campaigning over New Year's weekend.

== 2006 ==
=== January ===
- January 2:
  - Harper released the top 5 priorities of a possible Conservative government at a rally in Ottawa.
  - The Conservatives released the first attack ad of the campaign, with quotes from the Gomery Commission contrasted against footage of Paul Martin and former cabinet minister David Dingwall.
- January 3:
  - Finance minister Ralph Goodale met with the RCMP to discuss the income trust scandal.
  - Harper campaigned in Quebec, using a suitcase filled with $132,000 as a prop to symbolize Liberal overspending. The event was credited by some for improving the party's poll standing in Quebec.
- January 4:
  - Layton proposed a $1-billion national prescription drug plan.
  - Harper promised to decrease the landing fee for immigrants from $975 to $100.
  - Former MPs Elsie Wayne and Pat O'Brien announced the formation of "Vote Marriage Canada", a group designed to promote candidates opposed to same-sex marriage in Canada.
- January 5:
  - Harper announced a plan to "completely overhaul" Canada's justice system if elected, including increased prison sentences and beefed up police and border security.
  - Martin announced his plan for post-secondary education, including tuition fee reductions and increased study grants.
  - Layton promised to spend $200 million per year on training health care professionals.
  - An article in The Globe and Mail alleged that the Liberals granted $4 million to a small federalist group called Option Canada, that disappeared from the federal government's books.
- January 6:
  - The U.S. Securities and Exchange Commission told NDP MP Judy Wasylycia-Leis that an investigation into the federal government over the income trust scandal was under consideration.
  - The first polls showing the Conservatives ahead of the Liberals in popular support were released.
- January 7:
  - Harper said that he would repeal tax cuts passed by the Liberals just before the election, and implement a more wide-ranging tax cut instead.
  - As part of his environmental platform, Martin promised to spend $1 billion to clean up waterways, specifically the St. Lawrence Seaway.
- January 9:
  - The four party leaders took part in the second English debate, in Montreal.
  - During the debate, Martin promised to remove the ability of the federal government to invoke the Notwithstanding Clause in the Charter of Rights and Freedoms.
- January 10:
  - The second French-language debate tool place in Montreal.
  - The Liberal Party released twelve television attack ads targeting Harper, but was forced to withdraw one of them from the airwaves because it was deemed offensive to the Canadian military. Some political observers have compared the military ad to the 1993 Progressive Conservative commercial making fun of Jean Chrétien over his facial paralysis.
- January 11:
  - Martin said that he had personally approved the controversial military attack ad.
  - The Liberal platform was leaked on the website of the conservative Western Standard magazine.
- January 12:
  - Harper announced that Conservative candidate Derek Zeisman, running in the British Columbia riding of Southern Interior, would not be allowed to join the party caucus if elected. Zeisman had failed to disclose outstanding federal customs charges.
  - Harper also announced that Canada would back out of the Kyoto Accord if his party were elected.
- January 13:
  - Liberal candidate David Oliver, running in Abbotsford, British Columbia, was accused of bribing NDP candidate Jeffrey Hansen-Carlson with a job in Ottawa or with a city council seat in exchange for his abandoning his campaign and endorsing the Liberals. Martin later announced that Oliver would not be allowed to join caucus if elected.
  - Martin announced a "heroes fund" for families of police officers and firefighters killed in the line of duty.
  - The Conservatives released their full platform, covering all promises made during the campaign and including new ones such as limits on the capital gains tax, fixed election dates and preserving social programs.
- January 14:
  - Layton started actively campaigning for votes from disenchanted Liberals, all but predicting a Conservative victory.
- January 15:
  - Paul Darby, an economist that the Conservatives said approved their tax plan, said that he did not see the same version of the platform that the party made public.
- January 16:
  - The Conservatives released an attack ad in British Columbia targeted at Jack Layton that superimposed his mustache on voters mocking his policies.
  - Advance polls reported a higher-than-expected turnout.
- January 17:
  - The NDP and Liberals both released commercials appealing to each other's supporters to vote for their party in order to stop the Conservatives from winning a majority.
  - Shane Doan of the National Hockey League's Phoenix Coyotes filed a lawsuit with Quebec Liberal cabinet minister Denis Coderre over claims that Doan made racist remarks against a referee during a game.
- January 18:
  - Canadian Auto Workers president Buzz Hargrove, campaigning for the Liberals, accused Harper of holding separatist views based on his belief in provincial autonomy.
  - Harper campaigned in Toronto, signalling his expectation to win seats in the Liberal-dominated city.
- January 23: Federal Election!
  - Conservatives (124)
  - Liberals (103)
  - Bloc Québécois (51)
  - New Democrats (29)
  - Independent (1)
