= Timeline of the 2004 Canadian federal election =

The following is a timeline of the Canadian federal election, 2004. More on the election in general is available in the article 2004 Canadian federal election.

== 2002 ==
- May 13 - In seven by-elections across the country, the Liberal Party of Canada is re-elected in two ridings in Quebec, one in Newfoundland and Labrador, and one in Manitoba while losing one to the New Democratic Party (NDP) in Windsor West, where Brian Masse was elected, and one to the Progressive Conservative Party of Canada, when Rex Barnes was elected. The leader of the Canadian Alliance, Stephen Harper wins easily in Calgary Southwest, replacing out-going former Reform Party of Canada leader Preston Manning.
- June 2 - Paul Martin resigns as Minister of Finance. John Manley is named to replace him.
- August 21 - Prime Minister Jean Chrétien tells Canadians he will step down in February 2004.
- December 9 - The Bloc Québécois is able to hold on to two seats in by-elections electing Roger Gaudet in Berthier—Montcalm, replacing Michel Bellehumeur, and electing Sébastien Gagnon in Lac-Saint-Jean—Saguenay, replacing Stéphan Tremblay. Despite winning both elections, these elections were very close, especially since in the 2000 election these seats were won by 15 000 and 14 000 votes respectively.

== 2003 ==
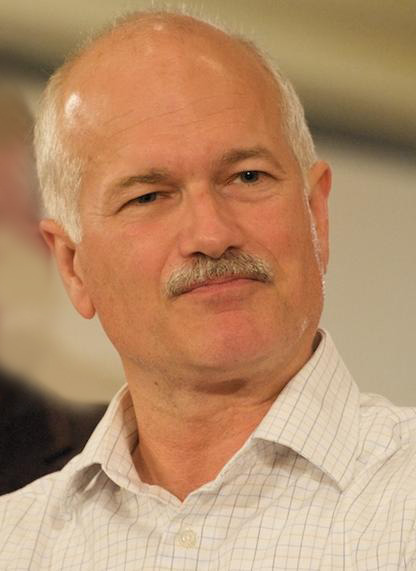
Jack Layton

- January 25 - Jack Layton is elected leader of the NDP at the party's convention in Toronto. Layton wins on the first ballot, with 53.5% of the vote.
- February 5 - Pierrette Venne is suspended from the caucus of the Bloc Québécois, and on February 6 sits as an Independent member of the Bloc.
- February 14 - Jim Harris is elected as the new leader of the Green Party of Canada.
- May 12 - The Liberal Party loses another seat through by-elections, this time to the Progressive Conservative Party as Gary Schellenberger replaces John Alexander Richardson in the riding of Perth—Middlesex.
- May 31 - Peter MacKay wins the Progressive Conservative leadership after forming a deal with leadership candidate David Orchard. MacKay promised a review of the North American Free Trade Agreement, and also promised that no deal on electoral cooperation would be made with the Canadian Alliance, a promise he would later break.
- June 16 - The Bloc Québécois lose two more seats, this time in by-elections as the Liberal Party of Canada's Christian Jobin replaces the out-going BQ Antoine Dubé in Lévis—Chutes-de-la-Chaudière, and the Liberals' Gilbert Barrette replaces the out-going BQ Pierre Brien in Témiscamingue.
- September 9 - Ottawa Centre MP Mac Harb is appointed to the Senate of Canada, leaving the seat vacant until the 2004 election. Ottawa lawyer Richard Mahoney will be the Liberals' representative for the riding in the upcoming election.
- October 15 - The Canadian Alliance and the Progressive Conservative Party announce plans to unite to form a new party called the Conservative Party of Canada.
- November 14 - Paul Martin officially becomes leader of the Liberal Party of Canada winning 3,242 of 3,455 votes against Sheila Copps.
- November 27 - Canadian Alliance Party leader Stephen Harper fires Alliance Member of Parliament Larry Spencer as Family Values Critic after his anti-gay remarks.
- November 28 - Liberal Party of Canada member John Manley announces his retirement from politics.
- December 3 - Member of Parliament Robert Lanctôt announces his departure from the Bloc Québécois to join the Liberal Party of Canada, saying to the press: "After dreaming about sovereignty for 40 years, I said to myself that dreaming is fine, but at a certain point you have to wake up." Also on December 3, Natural Resources Minister Herb Dhaliwal states that he will not seek re-election.
- December 5 - The Canadian Alliance votes with a 96% majority in favour of merging with the Progressive Conservative Party.
- December 6 - The Progressive Conservative Party votes with a 90% majority in favour of merging with the Canadian Alliance.
- December 8 - The Conservative Party of Canada is officially registered with Elections Canada. The party's first interim leader is Senator John Lynch-Staunton, with a formal leadership race scheduled for March 2004. Three Progressive Conservative MPs (Joe Clark, John Herron and André Bachand) announce that they will not sit as members of the new party, but will serve out their terms as Independent Progressive Conservatives.

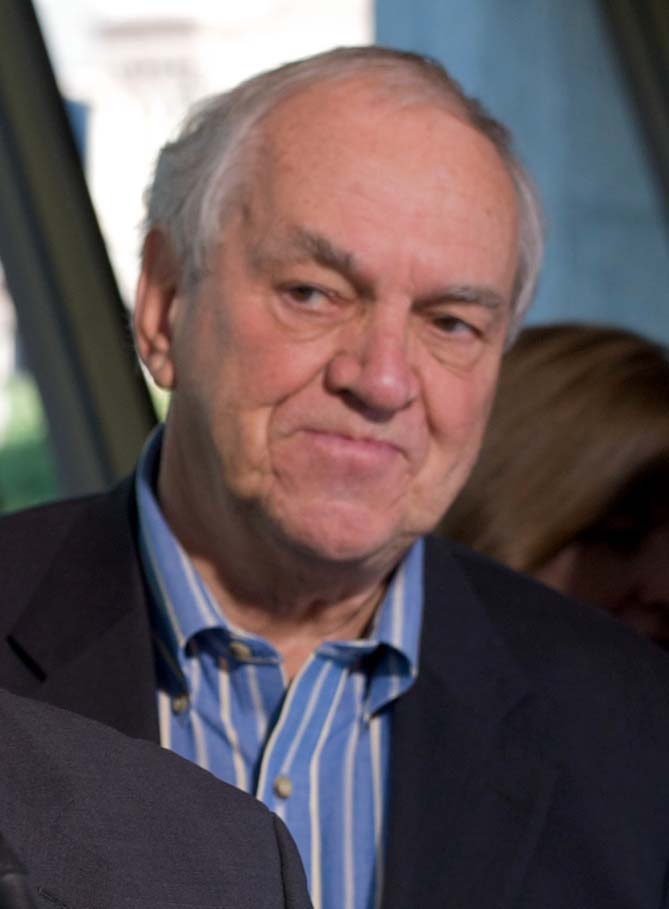
Ed Broadbent

- December 9 - Senators Lowell Murray, Norman Atkins and William Doody are the first senators to decide not join the new Conservative Party, choosing to remain in the Progressive Conservative Party if the Speaker will let them. Also on December 9, Liberal leadership runner-up Sheila Copps refuses Prime Minister-designate Paul Martin's patronage appointment proposal for Copps. She will have to fight to retain her riding, as Canada's ridings have been redrawn, and she now shares it with MP Tony Valeri.
- December 10 - Scott Brison, Progressive Conservative MP, crosses the floor, and sits with the Liberal Party of Canada. Brison is the fourth PC MP, out of an original caucus of 15, to decide not to sit with the new Conservative Party.
- December 11 - Former Agriculture Minister Lyle Vanclief announces he will not run in the 2004 election.
- December 12 - Paul Martin is sworn in as Canada's 21st Prime Minister, along with his cabinet. Notable ministers include Deputy Prime Minister Anne McLellan in Domestic Security, Ralph Goodale in Finance, Pierre Pettigrew in Health and Intergovernmental Affairs, Lucienne Robillard in Industry, Irwin Cotler in Justice, Bill Graham in Foreign Affairs and David Pratt in Defence. Jean Chrétien, on his last day as Prime Minister of Canada, resigns his seat in the House of Commons.
- December 18 - Former NDP leader Ed Broadbent announces he will be running in the riding of Ottawa Centre in the upcoming election.

== 2004 ==
=== Lead up to the election call ===
- January 9 - The new Conservative Party of Canada announces its new caucus officers, dividing the positions equally between members of the former Canadian Alliance and Progressive Conservative caucuses. Grant Hill is the new interim Leader of the Opposition in the House of Commons until the party's leadership race in March.
- January 14 - Vancouver Island MP Dr. Keith Martin resigns from the Conservative Party to sit as an Independent and announces he will seek the Liberal nomination for his riding of Equimalt—Juan de Fuca. Former Deputy Prime Minister Sheila Copps indicates that she may consider running for the NDP if she does not win the Liberal nomination battle in her riding.
- Quebec MP André Bachand, elected as a Progressive Conservative, confirms he will sit as an Independent and not run again.
- January 20 - Belinda Stronach announces that she will be running to become the leader of the new Conservative Party of Canada.
- January 20 - Ed Broadbent wins the NDP nomination for the riding of Ottawa Centre. He will run against Paul Martin loyalist Richard Mahoney.
- January 23 - The Natural Law Party of Canada de-registers with Elections Canada.
- February 2 - The first session of Parliament with Paul Martin as Prime Minister opens with the speech from the throne delivered by Governor General Adrienne Clarkson.
- February 5 - Former cabinet ministers Martin Cauchon and Bob Nault indicate they will not run again.
- February 6 - New Brunswick MP John Herron, currently sitting as an Independent Progressive Conservative, announces he will seek the Liberal nomination for his riding of Fundy in the 2004 election; Bloc co-founder Jean Lapierre announces he will seek the Liberal nomination in Cauchon's former riding of Outremont.
- February 10 - The Auditor General releases her report, launching the sponsorship scandal; Paul Martin calls for a public inquiry.
- February 13 - Former cabinet minister Jane Stewart announces she will not run again.
- February 16 - Saint John Conservative MP Elsie Wayne announces she will not run again.
- February 17 - John Bryden, MP for Ancaster-Dundas-Flamborough-Aldershot, announces that he is leaving the Liberals to sit as an independent. He will later join the Conservative Party of Canada.
- February 20 - Former Ontario Progressive Conservative Party member and Speaker of the Legislative Assembly of Ontario Gary Carr announces his intention to seek the Liberal nomination in Halton riding.
- March 6 - Tony Valeri defeats Sheila Copps in a battle for the Liberal nomination in Hamilton East—Stoney Creek. This battle, brought on by the 2004 redistribution of Canadian ridings, had been seen by some people as an attempt by forces loyal to Prime Minister Paul Martin to push Copps out of politics. Copps considers running as an independent. The brother of Ontario Premier Dalton McGuinty, David McGuinty is chosen over Ottawa city councillor Diane Deans to become the Liberal candidate in the riding of Ottawa South.
- March 7 - Carolyn Parrish, MP defeats fellow MP and former cabinet minister Steve Mahoney for the redistributed riding Mississauga—Erindale.
- March 8 - Former New Brunswick Premier Frank McKenna announces he is prepared to run if a suitable riding becomes available; Connie Fogal is acclaimed as the new leader of the Canadian Action Party.
- March 9 - Conservative leadership hopeful Belinda Stronach wins her party's nomination in Newmarket—Aurora, Ontario.
- March 10 - Sheila Copps accuses the PMO and Tony Valeri's campaign team of using fraudulent tactics to prevent her supporters from voting and to cause their ballots to be ignored. Monia Mazigh announces her intention to seek the NDP nomination in Ottawa South; the NDP had championed the cause of her husband Maher Arar after the US deported him to Syria despite his Canadian citizenship.
- March 20 - Stephen Harper is elected leader of the Conservative Party of Canada, with 55.5% of the vote on the first ballot.
- March 23 - Finance Minister Ralph Goodale tables what is generally seen as a pre-election budget in the House of Commons.
- March 29 - Progressive Canadian Party registers with Elections Canada
- March 30 - Published press reports indicate that Paul Martin will directly nominate BC's former NDP Premier Ujjal Dosanjh, Canfor chair David Emerson, IWA leader Dave Haggard, LPC(BC) President Bill Cunningham and subsidized housing manager Shirley Chan to run in BC ridings.
- March 31 - Liberal Party launches four television adds featuring Prime Minister Paul Martin talking about key election issues

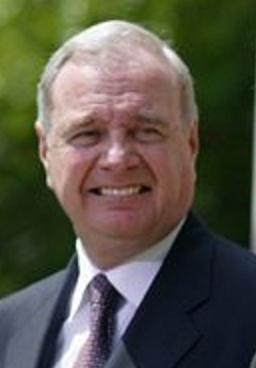
Paul Martin

- April 1 - Prime Minister Martin announces Ujjal Dosanjh, David Emerson and Shirley Chan as "star candidates" in Vancouver, British Columbia
- April 3 - Conservative leader Stephen Harper tours Atlantic Canada. The move is widely seen as the kickoff to his election campaign.
- April 14 - Monia Mazigh wins the NDP nomination in Ottawa South.
- April 15 - Admitting to shoplifting a diamond ring, Burnaby-Douglas NDP MP Svend Robinson announces he will not run again.
- April 25 - Independent MP Joe Clark, a former Prime Minister and leader of the Progressive Conservative Party endorses Liberal Prime Minister Paul Martin over Conservative leader Stephen Harper in the upcoming election.
- April 26 - Paul Martin and his cabinet discuss whether or not to call a June election at a dinner meeting at 24 Sussex Drive. CTV News reports that Martin will make a decision on a spring election in one week's time but that if an election is to go ahead the writs will be dropped on May 9 with a vote on June 14.
- April 27 - Health Minister Pierre Pettigrew holds a press conference to announce that he's in favour of public delivery of health care claiming that he misspoke the day before when he implied in an interview that private health care delivery was an option. This retraction is seen as a move by Pettigrew to prevent his earlier statement from being used by the opposition in the election campaign.
- April 29 & 30 - Paul Martin visits George W. Bush in Washington, D.C. Some predict an election will be called soon after Martin returns.
- May 5 - The contents of the Conservative Party's policy booklet are revealed. More right wing Alliance policies have been abandoned. Also, Canadian Press reports that Liberal insiders say the election will be held on June 28.
- May 6 - Press reports indicate that Winnipeg Mayor Glen Murray will run for the Liberals in the riding of Charleswood—St. James, ending months of speculation. Incumbent Liberal MP John Harvard will reportedly be named Lieutenant Governor of Manitoba. Olivia Chow, Toronto city councillor and wife of NDP leader Jack Layton announced she will run in Trinity—Spadina.
- May 7 - Former Saskatchewan premier Grant Devine announces he will run as an independent in the riding of Souris—Moose Mountain.
- May 10 - Arrests are made in connection with the sponsorship scandal: Jean Brault, president of Groupaction, and Charles Guité arrested by the Royal Canadian Mounted Police for fraud.
- May 13 - York Centre Liberal MP Art Eggleton announces he will not run again. Former Montreal Canadiens goaltender Ken Dryden is expected to run in his place.
- May 14 - Parliament's last day of sitting before a summer break. Sheila Copps ends speculation she might run as an Independent in Hamilton East—Stoney Creek by announcing she is leaving politics.
- May 17 - Ken Dryden, former star goaltender for the Montreal Canadiens and current President of Maple Leaf Sports and Entertainment confirms he will run in York Centre.
- May 22 - The Prime Minister's Office announces that Paul Martin will meet with Governor General Adrienne Clarkson on May 23.
- May 23 - Paul Martin visits Clarkson at 13:00 (17:00 UTC) to ask that Parliament be dissolved for a June 28 election.

=== After the election call ===
==== May ====
- May 24
  - Liberals: Paul Martin in New Brunswick, tells Canadians "This election will define the kind of country Canadians want."
  - Conservatives: The Conservatives unveil their television ads
  - NDP: Leader Jack Layton launches his eight campaign promises to Canadians in Vancouver.
  - BQ: The Bloc announce they will be running 17 candidates who are less than 25 years of age in order to gain the youth vote.
- May 25
  - Liberals: Paul Martin, speaking in Cobourg, Ontario, announces a $9-billion initiative to improve health care which would include money for home care, increased funding for health care, the reduction of hospital waiting lists and the introduction of a pharmacare plan for seniors.
  - Conservatives: Harper speaks in Fredericton where he gets the endorsement of New Brunswick premier Bernard Lord.
  - NDP: Layton, in Saskatoon, also denounces Martin's health care plan, pointing to his cutting of health care funding while finance minister.
  - BQ: Duceppe, in Drummondville, complains that Martin's plan does not involve enough money for the provinces.
  - Marxist–Leninist: Party announces it has 76 registered candidates.
- May 26
  - Conservatives: Former Mulroney cabinet minister John Crosbie announces he is "seriously considering" running in the Avalon riding in Newfoundland.
  - NDP: The NDP introduces its election platform, including $29 billion for health care, an inheritance tax, and a repeal of terrorism laws.
  - BQ: Gilles Duceppe angrily rejects allegations raised by Health Minister Pierre Pettigrew that the Bloc "likes to take pleasure in its homogeneity" and does not represent multicultural Quebec.
- May 27
  - Liberals: Finance Minister Ralph Goodale indicates that the Liberals will soon announce plans to for "significant" increases in spending on both Defence and Foreign Aid.
  - Conservatives: Bilingualism critic Scott Reid resigns from his post after he made comments that his party would overhaul the nation's policy on bilingualism.
  - NDP: Jack Layton makes controversial comments on homelessness, blaming Paul Martin for the deaths of homeless people in Toronto.
  - Greens: Following an announcement from The Broadcaster's Consortium (composed of CBC, Radio-Canada, CTV, Global and TVA) that only the four major parties would participate in the national televised leader's debates, Green Party leader Jim Harris announces he is considering legal action against the consortium.

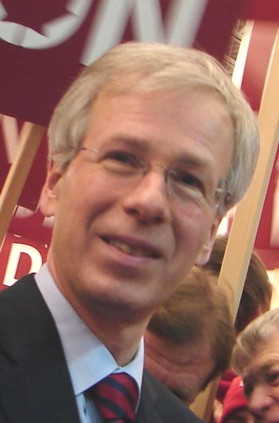
Stéphane Dion

- May 28
  - Liberals: Martin promises a new deal for Canadian cities. If elected, cities will receive $2 billion annually from the federal gas tax.
  - Conservatives: Harper says he would give the Auditor General further power to monitor government spending if elected.
  - NDP: Jack Layton announces that he would repeal the Clarity Act if elected. Most of the party's caucus had voted in favour of the legislation when it was enacted. Former Liberal Intergovernmental Affairs minister Stéphane Dion publicly blasts the NDP for the reversal and their nomination of separatist candidates, a noteworthy move as the Chrétien loyalist had previously been widely considered frozen out of the Martin election strategy.
  - CHP: Elections Canada re-registers the Christian Heritage Party of Canada after a four-year hiatus.
- May 29
  - Liberals: Martin campaigns in Harper's hometown of Calgary, visiting the dressing room of the Stanley Cup finalist Calgary Flames.
  - Conservatives: Harper says Martin cannot distance himself from Dalton McGuinty's unpopular provincial Liberal government in Ontario, which he says is closely tied to the federal party.
  - NDP: Layton abandons a long-standing NDP policy, saying that he would not pull Canada out of the North Atlantic Treaty Organization if elected.
  - PC: Elections Canada registers the Progressive Canadian Party.
  - CHP: Ron Gray starts his campaign tour.
- May 30
  - Liberals: In a CTV interview, former Newfoundland and Labrador premier Brian Tobin makes the first admission by a top Liberal that the party is expecting to win a minority government. Martin takes his first day off from the campaign. Toronto-Danforth MP Dennis Mills, running against NDP leader Jack Layton, engages in a shouting match with Layton's wife Olivia Chow, herself an NDP candidate.
  - Conservatives: Harper also takes the day off.
  - NDP: In a speech to his supporters in Winnipeg, NDP parliamentary leader Bill Blaikie speaks out in opposition to Jack Layton's proposal to repeal the Clarity Bill. He states in a later interview that "there continues to be differences of opinion, not just between me and [Mr. Layton] on this, but within the party itself."
  - Green: Jim Harris is interviewed on Global Sunday.
- May 31
  - Conservatives: Harper unveils his platform on defence, promising to increase spending on the military, buying several pieces of new equipment. John Crosbie announces he will not return to politics, ending speculation he would stand for the new Conservative party in Avalon, NL.
  - NDP: Layton attacks Harper's defence policy, saying it is an attempt to appease the United States. He also compares Harper's tax strategy to those of Gordon Campbell and Ralph Klein.
  - CHP: Gray is a guest on the Miracle Channel public affairs program hosted by Paul Arthur.

==== June ====
- June 1
  - Liberals: Cabinet ministers Judy Sgro and John McCallum heckle Conservative leader Stephen Harper at a speech in Markham, Ontario.
  - Conservatives: Health critic Rob Merrifield says women seeking abortions should get private third-party counselling. Harper says this does not mean the Conservative party will work to end abortions.
  - Marijuana Party: Launch of the national party headquarters, 2004 campaign platform and promotions.
- June 2
  - Liberals: Paul Martin was in Winnipeg, Manitoba to tour a research facility.
  - Conservatives: Stephen Harper addresses the Toronto board of Trade. He also announces, if elected the Conservatives may use the notwithstanding clause in the Canadian Constitution to ban same-sex marriage. The Conservatives continue to be pestered on social issues such as abortion by the Liberals, and the media.
  - NDP: The NDP respond to the Liberal platform stating it is "An empty health package; a broken promise; a small but good start; and a misplaced priority."
  - Bloc Québécois: The BQ makes a proposal on disciplining the petroleum industry.
  - Green: Party leader Jim Harris calls a press conference regarding his lawsuit against the broadcasters who plan on excluding him from the national televised debates. A survey by Oracle Research says that 76% of voters say they support his inclusion in the debates. Harris appears on CTV News Channel program Countdown with Mike Duffy, live from the Carrot Common in Toronto-Danforth.
  - Communist: The Montreal Gazette reports "the Communist Party of Canada will legislate a 32-hour work week (with no loss in take-home pay) and a minimum wage of $12", if elected.
  - Libertarians: Elections Canada re-registers the Libertarian Party of Canada after a seven-year hiatus.
- June 3
  - Liberals: Paul Martin unveils his election platform, entitled "Moving Canada Forward." The platform promises approximately $28 billion in spending. One of the new highlights is a national child-care program like the one currently used in Quebec. Both Layton and Harper say the Liberals proposed the same program in 1993, but failed to deliver.
  - Conservatives: Harper proposes a middle-class tax cut. A same-sex marriage activist grilling Stephen Harper on the issue at a campaign stop in Guelph, Ontario is beaten by Conservative supporters before being escorted out by security.
- June 5
  - Former U.S. president Ronald Reagan dies. All major party heads take the day off after hearing of his death as a sign of respect for the former president. Harper and Layton said that the major party heads took the day off after hearing of Reagan's death because he was "such a significant figure in world history" and "it's always sad to lose someone who has led a nation and we want to express our best wishes and sincere condolences."
  - Conservatives: Harper introduces his platform, "Demand Better." It includes $58 billion in spending and tax cuts, and increasing funding for the military and health care. After hearing of Reagan's death, he takes the rest of the day off "to express profound sympathy to the family of Ronald Reagan, and to the American people, on the passing of such a significant figure in world history" who was "the Churchill of his era."
- June 6
  - Sixtieth anniversary of D-Day. All major party heads take the day off to mark the anniversary. Paul Martin attends D-Day ceremonies in Normandy. Stephen Harper and Jack Layton attend a D-Day memorial service in Ottawa at the National War Memorial.
- June 7
  - Liberals: The Liberals run French ads in Quebec attacking the Conservatives.
  - Conservatives: Harper holds a rally in Quebec in an attempt to blunt the impact of the attack. For the first time polls show the Conservatives in first place across Canada.
  - NDP: The NDP switches strategy and begins to attack Stephen Harper and the Conservatives.
- June 8
  - Senator Anne C. Cools announced that she is no longer a supporter of the Liberal Party and would henceforth be a Conservative.
  - Liberals: Paul Martin attacks Stephen Harper and the Conservative Party for their position on abortion and for Harper's support of using the notwithstanding clause of the Canadian Constitution to exempt some legislation from being affected by the Canadian Charter of Rights and Freedoms.
- June 10
  - Canada's Chief Electoral Officer, Jean-Pierre Kingsley, announces that radio and television stations, as well as websites, will no longer be prohibited from transmitting election results in areas of the country where polls are still open on election night.
- June 14
  - The leaders of the four major political parties in this election participate in the French-language broadcast debate held at the National Arts Centre in Ottawa. General media consensus is that, while Martin and Harper were attacked on their records and platforms, no leader was able to provide a serious boost to their own position.
- June 15
  - The leaders participate in the English-language broadcast debate, again held at the National Arts Centre in Ottawa.
- June 18
  - The Conservatives release press statements stating that the Liberals (and later, the NDP) are in favour of child pornography. The Liberal statement is retracted, but neither is apologized for.
- June 21
  - The NDP announce that they no longer support their previous platform promise of having an inheritance tax, possibly to increase support in wealthy upper-class neighbourhoods such as those in the Toronto riding of Beaches—East York.
- June 23
  - Alberta Health Minister Gary Mar announced that his governments intentions will not violate the Canada Health Act, and will be announced after the election. Pundits believe this is because they do not want to effect the Conservatives' chances in the election.
- June 24
  - Layton, Duceppe, and Martin are all in Quebec for Saint Jean Baptiste Day.
- June 25
  - In an open letter, Ralph Nader warns against voting for the Conservative Party.
  - Conservative Randy White told filmmakers "To heck with the courts, eh" in protest to recent court decisions in Canada, angering many.
  - Liberals: Martin tells voters not to vote for the NDP, because a vote for the NDP is a vote for Harper.
  - Bloc Québécois: Duceppe tells Canadians that they should not fear the Bloc, because separatism is not on their agenda.
  - NDP: Layton spends 18 hours in Ontario. Former supporters of Sheila Copps endorse the NDP.
- June 26
  - Liberals: Martin visits British Columbia.
  - Conservatives: Harper is in Kelowna and is greeted by protesters. He generates laughs among his supporters by attacking all the other major parties at once: "A Liberal-NDP coalition backed by the Bloc: corruption, taxation, and separation - all in one administration!"
  - Bloc Québécois: Duceppe, comfortable with his lead in Quebec visits traditionally Liberal ridings.
  - NDP: Ralph Nader announces his endorsement of Jack Layton.
- June 28
  - Liberals: Martin re-elected, Liberals win a minority government with 135 of 308 seats.

=== After the election ===
- October 4
  - The new parliament opens with the formalities, which included the speaker, Peter Milliken, being re-elected.
- October 5
  - Governor General Adrienne Clarkson opens a new parliament with the speech from the throne.
