= Vancouver Sun (Re) =

Supreme Court of Canada case

- Supreme Court of Canada

Hearing: 2003: December 10; Judgment: 2004: June 23.
- Full case name: The Vancouver Sun v Attorney General of Canada, Attorney General of British Columbia, “The Named Person”, Ajaib Singh Bagri and Ripudaman Singh Malik
- Citations: [2004] 2 S.C.R. 332, 2004 SCC 43
- Docket No.: 29878
- Prior history: APPEAL from the Supreme Court of British Columbia
- Ruling: Appeal allowed in part

Court membership
- Chief Justice: Beverley McLachlin; Puisne Justices: Frank Iacobucci, John C. Major, Michel Bastarache, Ian Binnie, Louise Arbour, Louis LeBel, Marie Deschamps, Morris Fish

Reasons given
- Majority: Iacobucci and Arbour JJ., joined by McLachlin C.J. and Major, Binnie and Fish JJ
- Concur/dissent: Bastarache and Deschamps JJ.

Re Vancouver Sun is a leading Supreme Court of Canada case regarding the open court principle, freedom of the press and publication bans. The open court principle is the "right of public access to the courts".

== Facts ==
=== Section 83.28 Orders and Investigative Hearings ===
Section 83.28 of the Criminal Code operates with respect to investigations of terrorism offences. The section allows police to apply for a court order to compel a potential witness to:

- attend an investigative hearing;
- submit to questioning by police at the hearing;
- to bring all documents and other materials in their possession to the hearing

The questioning of the witness occurs before a judge.

Section 83.28 also allows for the exclusion of the public and media from the hearing.

=== Investigation of Air India Bombing ===
In 1985, two acts of terrorism caused the deaths of two baggage handlers in Japan and the 329 passengers and crew of Air India Flight 182. The Air India bombing was the largest mass murder in Canadian history.

In 2004, two accused were on trial for conspiracy to murder and other offences relating to those events.

As part of the investigation, the Crown obtained a court order requiring a potential Crown witness, a "Named Person", to attend a judicial investigative hearing for examination. The order was made pursuant to section 83.28 of the Criminal Code.

The investigative hearing was to be held in camera, meaning that the hearing would not be open to the public or press.

== Legal Challenge ==
A reporter from the Vancouver Sun newspaper became aware of the investigative hearing when she recognized lawyers from the Air India terrorist attack and attempted to follow them as they entered a closed courtroom. The reporter was barred from the courtroom and in response the newspaper filed a legal challenge for (1) access to material filed in the court proceedings and (2) a declaration that no court proceedings should be held in private.

The application was opposed on the basis that the confidentiality was necessary to preserve the integrity of the investigation and to prevent mischief in the Sikh community against the witness.

== Lower Court Decision ==
The Supreme Court of British Columbia published a Synopsis of Reasons for Judgment which described the general nature and the outcome of the proceedings. The court ruled that the synopsis was sufficient public disclosure.

The appeal of the BC Supreme Court decision was made directly to the Supreme Court of Canada. The British Columbia Court of Appeal did not hear the appeal.

== Decision ==
The Supreme Court of Canada ordered that:

#The appeal be allowed in part and that the order made by the investigative judge, Justice Holmes, be varied.

1. That the name of the Named Person be made public.
2. That the proposed judicial investigative hearing be held in public, subject to any order of the presiding judge that the public be excluded and/or that a publication ban be put in place regarding aspects of the anticipated evidence to be given by the Named Person.

The Court, citing paragraph 83.28(5)(e), also ordered the investigative judge to "review the continuing need for any secrecy at the end of the investigative hearing and release publicly any part of the information gathered at the hearing that can be made public without unduly jeopardizing the interests of the Named Person, of third parties, or of the investigation".

=== Reasoning ===
The majority of the Court, represented by Iacobucci and Arbour JJ. felt strongly that

The open court principle has long been recognized as a cornerstone of the common law... The right of public access to the courts is “one of principle . . . turning, not on convenience, but on necessity”... “Justice is not a cloistered virtue”... “Publicity is the very soul of justice. It is the keenest spur to exertion, and the surest of all guards against improbity... Public access to the courts guarantees the integrity of judicial processes by demonstrating “that justice is administered in a non-arbitrary manner, according to the rule of law”... Openness is necessary to maintain the independence and impartiality of courts. It is integral to public confidence in the justice system and the public’s understanding of the administration of justice. Moreover, openness is a principal component of the legitimacy of the judicial process and why the parties and the public at large abide by the decisions of courts. The open court principle is inextricably linked to the freedom of expression protected by s. 2(b) of the Charter and advances the core values therein... The freedom of the press to report on judicial proceedings is a core value. Equally, the right of the public to receive information is also protected by the constitutional guarantee of freedom of expression... The press plays a vital role in being the conduit through which the public receives that information regarding the operation of public institutions... Consequently, the open court principle, to put it mildly, is not to be lightly interfered with.

The court noted "[e]ven in cases where the very existence of an investigative hearing would have been the subject of a sealing order, the investigative judge should put in place, at the end of the hearing, a mechanism whereby its existence, and as much as possible of its content, should be publicly released."

=== Dissent ===
In their reasons for dissent, Justices Bastarache and Deschamps noted that public access to investigative hearings would normally defeat the purpose of the proceedings by rendering them ineffective as an investigative tool.

== See also ==
- Open court principle
