= Publication ban =

Ban on publicizing details of court proceedings

A publication ban is a court order which prohibits the public or media from disseminating certain details of an otherwise public judicial proceeding. In Canada, publication bans are most commonly issued when the safety or reputation of a victim or witness may be hindered by having their identity openly broadcast in the press. They are also commonly issued when the crime involves minors or is sexual in nature.

In countries where press freedom is the norm, an actual ban on publication is used mostly for ongoing court cases where publicity may affect the case, although in Canada the balance has tilted away from disclosure since the passage in 1985 of the Freedom of Information and Protection of Privacy Act (Ontario).

== In Canada ==
There are several types of publication ban permitted under the Canadian criminal code:

- An order restricting the publication of information identifying complainants of sexual offences [ s.486.4 ]
- An order restricting publication of information identifying victims and witnesses [ s.486.5(1) ]
- An order restricting publication of information identifying a justice system participant [ s.486.5(2) ]

Under s. 486.6, anyone who violates any of these orders (s. 486.4(1), (2) or (3) or 486.5(1) or (2)) can be liable for a summary conviction offence.

=== General publication ban (s. 486(1),(2)) ===
Section 486.5(1) provides the court with the authority to make an order "directing that any information that could identify the victim or witness shall not be published in any document or broadcast or transmitted in any way if the judge or justice is satisfied that the order is necessary for the proper administration of justice."

Section 486.5(2) provides the authority to make an order to not reveal "information that could identify the justice system participant".

This can be applied for by a prosecutor, a victim or a witness, a judge or justice. (s. 486.5(1))

Under s.486.5(4), the application must be made in writing and notice must be given to the prosecutor, accused, or any other person affected by the order that the judge specifies. The application itself as well as the contents of a hearing on the application cannot be published.(s. 486.5(6), (9))

The order shall only be made where the applicant establishes that the order is "necessary for the proper administration of justice". (s. 486(1), (2), (5))

The factors that must be considered to decide whether to proceed are set out in s. 486.5(7):

(a) the right to a fair and public hearing;
(b) whether there is a real and substantial risk that the victim, witness or justice system participant would suffer significant harm if their identity were disclosed;
(c) whether the victim, witness or justice system participant needs the order for their security or to protect them from intimidation or retaliation;
(d) society’s interest in encouraging the reporting of offences and the participation of victims, witnesses and justice system participants in the criminal justice process;
(e) whether effective alternatives are available to protect the identity of the victim, witness or justice system participant;
(f) the salutary and deleterious effects of the proposed order;
(g) the impact of the proposed order on the freedom of expression of those affected by it; and
(h) any other factor that the judge or justice considers relevant.

=== Sexual offence publication ban ===
Under s. 486.4 (1), the court may make an order "directing that any information that could identify the complainant or a witness" not be published, broadcast or transmitted for any sexual offences (as listed in s. 486.4(1)(a)).

Any complainant or witness under the age of 18 years must be notified of their right to make an application for an order, and if requested by the complainant, prosecutor or witness under 18 years of age, the judge must made the order. (s. 486.4(2))

Similarly, under 486.4(3), for charges under 163.1, the court must make an order in relation to any person who comprises the subject of child pornographic materials.

=== Jury identification ban ===
Under 631(6), the court or crown may order a publication ban on any information that may tend to identify jury members where it "is necessary for the proper administration of justice".

=== Prominent cases ===
In Canada, the role of publication bans came under intense scrutiny in April, 2005 when Justice Gomery issued a publication ban on the testimony of three key witnesses at the Gomery Inquiry in the sponsorship scandal. The ban was granted at the request of the lawyers for Jean Brault, Paul Coffin and Chuck Guité, who argued that intense media coverage would bias potential jurors for their upcoming criminal trials. Shortly after the ban was imposed, however, an edited summary of Brault's testimony was posted on an American blogger's website, where it was immediately accessible and became well-known to Canadians interested in the story. Also, the inquiry remained public, so the opposition parties were aware of what was being revealed even while their respective leaders were kept intentionally unaware to prevent them from accidentally violating the ban at a press conference. Justice Gomery later lifted the ban on most of the testimony.

In January 2005, author Stephen Williams was sentenced for violating the publication ban by including forbidden details in his two books on Paul Bernardo and Karla Homolka, making him only the second person sentenced for violating the publication ban—the first being one of the "Electronic ban breakers". Stephen Williams reached a plea agreement with the Canadian authorities in which he agreed that he would no longer use "any materials belonging to the Crown" as part of his writings.

In December 2010, a publication ban was imposed in the case of the murder of Victoria Stafford because the victim was a minor.

The Court also imposed a publication ban in the case of Nicole Wagler, a 17-year-old from Milverton, Ontario, who was brutally murdered December 2012.

== In the United Kingdom ==
Where a judge considers that the reporting of an ongoing case may prejudice a trial, what are termed "reporting restrictions" are likely to be imposed while the case is in progress. For example, an order prohibiting publication under Section 11 of the Contempt of Court Act 1981 was issued forbidding any United Kingdom newspaper from publishing certain information regarding a memo alleged to be an official transcript of a conversation between U.S. President George W. Bush and UK Prime Minister Tony Blair, which, in the context of the planning for the 2003 invasion of Iraq, regarded an alleged plan to bomb selected offices of the Arabic-language television news station Al Jazeera.

The United Kingdom has a tradition of open justice, and the courts are bound to respect it by both domestic law (the various procedure rules and Human Rights Act 1998) and international law (Article 6 and Article 10 of the European Convention on Human Rights). In most cases, a permanent bar on reporting a case would not be consistent with these principles, or meet the requirements for such restrictions under Article 10, in particular that they be "necessary in a democratic society" or for "maintaining the authority and impartiality of the judiciary". As such, restrictions are normally lifted once any possibility of further appeal has been exhausted.

There is a blanket prohibition on reporting the identities of alleged or confirmed victims of sexual offences in England and Wales, under the Sexual Offences (Amendment) Act 1992. Proceedings of youth courts and family courts are also held in private, and reporting restrictions apply automatically, but can be lifted in certain circumstances.

== In the United States ==
Brian Cathcart of The Independent has stated that the First Amendment to the U.S. Constitution "ensures that the media enjoy great latitude in the coverage of criminal investigations and trials."

A notable legal dispute over a government attempt to censor newspapers arose in the context of the Watergate scandal during the early 1970s. Richard Nixon's administration attempted to block The New York Times and the Washington Post from publishing information contained in the Pentagon Papers. The matter was resolved after a two-week delay by the United States Supreme Court in New York Times Co. v. United States, in which the Court ruled that the publication ban was a violation of the First Amendment guarantee of freedom of speech and of the press.

=== Publication of name of sexual assault victim ===
The US Supreme Court ruled the imposition of damages for truthfully publishing public information violates the First Amendment.

== See also ==
- Censorship
- Prior restraint
- Karla Homolka case publication ban
- Post-assault treatment of sexual assault victims
- Sponsorship scandal, Jean Brault
- Dave Hilton, Jr.
- D-Notice
