= Myriam Bédard =

Canadian biathlete

Myriam Bédard MSC
Personal information
- Born: December 22, 1969 (age 56) Loretteville, Quebec
- Height: 161 cm (5 ft 3 in)
- Weight: 54 kg (119 lb)

Sport
- Sport: Biathlon
- Club: Courcelette Quebec
Medal record
Women's biathlon
Representing Canada
Olympic Games
Gold medal – first place	1994 Lillehammer	15 km individual
Gold medal – first place	1994 Lillehammer	7.5 km sprint
Bronze medal – third place	1992 Albertville	15 km individual
World Championships
Gold medal – first place	1993 Borovets	7.5 km sprint
Silver medal – second place	1993 Borovets	15 km individual

Myriam Bédard (born December 22, 1969) is a Canadian retired biathlete. She represented Canada at two Winter Olympics winning gold medals, and a bronze medal. As of 2022, Bédard is the only Canadian biathlete, male or female, ever to win an Olympic medal, and the only North American biathlete ever to win Olympic gold.

== Olympic career ==
Myriam Bédard was born in 1969. Born in Loretteville, Quebec, Bédard learned marksmanship as a member of the Royal Canadian Army Cadets' 2772 cadet corps, which she joined at the age of 15, and participated in her first biathlon event at age 15. She became Canadian junior champion in the sport in 1987.

In 1991, Bédard was the second Canadian to win a biathlon World Cup event, and she formed part of the Canadian team at the 1992 Winter Olympics, in Albertville, France – the first time women competed in biathlon at the Olympics – and Bédard won a bronze medal in the 15 km. The following year she won her first major title, as she won the 7.5 km event at the World Championships, also placing second in the 15 km race.

At the 1994 Winter Olympics in Lillehammer, Norway, she improved this performance and won both individual events, then served as Canada's flag bearer in the closing ceremony. She was also awarded the Lou Marsh Trophy in 1994 for the year's top performance by a Canadian athlete, as well as the Velma Springstead Trophy for best Canadian female athlete.

In March 1994, she was awarded the Meritorious Service Cross.

She is an honorary member of the Royal Military College of Canada, student # S120....

== Post-Olympic career ==
She briefly retired from the sport to give birth to her daughter (the father was another biathlete, and soldier, Jean Paquet). Her comeback was not very successful, being hampered by injuries. After the 1998 Winter Olympics, Bédard retired from biathlon. She later announced an attempt to make the Canadian Olympic team as a speed skater, but did not pursue this goal for long. In 2004, Bédard was one of eight persons in the International Biathlon Union's (IBU) executive board, where she served as the IBU's vice-president responsible for special issues.

On February 27, 2004, in the context of the sponsorship scandal that came to light soon after Prime Minister Jean Chrétien left office, Bédard asserted that she had been forced to resign from her marketing department job at Via Rail in 2002 shortly after raising concerns about the company's dealings with advertiser Groupaction. Responses to her allegations led to the firings a few days later of Via Rail chair Jean Pelletier and president Marc LeFrançois.

However, in testimony before the Standing Committee on Public Accounts in late March 2004, Bédard made further allegations that were met with widespread skepticism: she claimed that she had been told that Groupaction was involved in drug trafficking, that her partner Nima Mazhari had personally convinced Prime Minister Chrétien to keep Canada out of the war in Iraq, and that Québécois race car legend Jacques Villeneuve had been paid $12 million to wear a Canadian flag on his uniform. Villeneuve strongly denied the latter allegation, calling it "ludicrous."

According to CBC News, an arbitrator's report later concluded that Bédard had voluntarily left Via Rail.

On December 8, 2006, a Canada-wide arrest warrant was issued for Bédard for the abduction of her daughter. Bédard was in Washington, D.C. Bédard was arrested by the United States Marshals Service in Columbia, Maryland. She was detained in Columbia, Maryland until her extradition to Canada. She appeared in court in Baltimore, Maryland on December 26, 2006. Her daughter was under the care of the United States Marshals Service prior to being returned to her father December 23. Bédard returned to Canada on January 4, 2007. On September 20, 2007, a jury at a Quebec City found Bédard guilty of child abduction for violating a child custody agreement. On October 9, 2007, she was sentenced to a conditional discharge and two years probation. Bédard was also charged with contempt of court later on and sentenced to 45 days of community service.

== See also ==
- Beckie Scott
- Lise Meloche
