= Paul Coffin =

Canadian businessman (1942–2021)

- Born: 1942
- Died: March 19, 2021 (aged 78–79)
- Conviction: Fraud
- Penalty: Conditional sentence of two-years-less-a-day

Paul R. Coffin (1942 – March 19, 2021) was a Canadian businessman who pleaded guilty to 15 counts of fraud in connection with the sponsorship scandal involving the Liberal Party of Canada in May 2005. As head of Communication Coffin, an advertising agency based in Montreal, Quebec, Coffin was contracted by Public Works Canada to handle sponsorship deals on their behalf. The RCMP charged him with 18 counts of fraud for submitting fake invoices in relation to this work, which Coffin later admitted to during the Gomery Commission. As part of his plea bargain, Coffin admitted to defrauding the federal government of $1,556,625, of which more than $1 million was eventually repaid to the federal government. He initially received a conditional sentence of two years less a day to be served in the community, although the Quebec Court of Appeal overturned this, and sentenced him to 18 months in jail.

According to Elections Canada, between 1999 and 2001 Coffin donated a total of $24,000 to the Liberal Party of Canada, the governing party of Canada at the time.

Along with Jean Brault and Charles Guité, Coffin is one of only a few people who were ultimately charged in connection with the sponsorship scandal. He died on March 19, 2021.
