= CBC v New Brunswick AG =

Canadian Broadcasting Corp. v. New Brunswick (Attorney General)
- Supreme Court of Canada

Hearing: 3 March 1989 Judgment: 21 December 1989
- Citations: [1996] 3 SCR 480
- Docket No.: 24305
- Prior history: Appeal from the Court of Appeal for New Brunswick
- Ruling: Appeal allowed

Court membership
- Chief Justice: Brian Dickson; Puisne Justices: William McIntyre, Antonio Lamer, Bertha Wilson, Gérard La Forest, Claire L'Heureux-Dubé, John Sopinka, Charles Gonthier, Peter Cory

Reasons given
- Unanimous reasons by: Yes
- Majority: La Forest J.

Canadian Broadcasting Corp. v. New Brunswick (Attorney General) [1996] 3 SCR 480 was a decision by the Supreme Court of Canada concerning the open court principle.

== Background ==
At a sentencing hearing for sexual assault, the trial judge excluded the public and the media from the courtroom for parts of the sentencing through an exclusion order made under Section 486(1) of the Criminal Code, which permits a judge to do this.

Because of the exclusion, the Canadian Broadcasting Corporation challenged the constitutionality of Section 486(1) as an infringement on the freedom of the press under section 2(b) of the Canadian Charter of Rights and Freedoms, arguing that freedom of the press required that they not be excluded from hearings.

The Court of Queen's Bench of New Brunswick found that Section 2(b), which protects freedom of expression in Canada, had been infringed, but that the infringement was justifiable under Section 1, the reasonable limits clause, of the Charter.

== Decision ==
On appeal, the Supreme Court unanimously upheld the constitutionality of Section 486(1) but quashed the exclusion order. Judge La Forest J. found that the trial judge erred in issuing the order. He found that though in general, deference should be given to the judge's exercise of his discretion, in this case the order was not necessary to further the proper administration of justice.
