= Jacques Corriveau =

Jacques Corriveau (c. 1933 – 23 June 2018) was a Quebec businessperson, owner of the graphic design firm Pluri Design Canada Inc, a long-time Liberal Party of Canada organizer, and convicted criminal. His close ties to the Liberal Party of Canada and his firm's sponsorship program put him and it at the center of the sponsorship scandal, and ultimately resulted in criminal charges.

Corriveau was known for having a very close relationship with once Prime Minister of Canada Jean Chrétien. He first met Chrétien in 1976 and was a participant in Chrétien's failed 1984 bid for Liberal Party leadership. On Chrétien's second bid in 1990, Corriveau was campaign organizer.

Through Pluri Design, Corriveau was the designer of several pavilions at the 1967 Montreal Expo as well as the athletes' village for the 1976 Summer Olympics. The firm also obtained several major printing contracts for Liberal elections posters for the 1993, 1997, and 2000 federal elections.

The Gomery inquiry has found that Pluri Design made a little less than $9 million from sponsorship related contracts. As well, he personally earned roughly $0.5 million as a subcontractor for Groupaction.

In December 2013, Corriveau was charged under the Criminal Code with fraud against the government, forgery, and laundering proceeds of crime. He was subsequently convicted and sentenced to a four-year prison term. He died on June 23, 2018, while his sentence was being appealed.
