= David McLaughlin (political figure) =

5th Chief of Staff to the Prime Minister
- In office 1993
- Prime Minister: Brian Mulroney
- Preceded by: Hugh Segal
- Succeeded by: Jodi White

Personal details
- Children: 2

David McLaughlin is a Canadian political figure. He was Chief of Staff to Prime Minister Brian Mulroney in 1993.

== Career ==
A native of New Brunswick, he served as deputy minister and then chief of staff to Premier Bernard Lord from his victory in the 1999 election until just after the 2003 election. From 2003 to 2005 he was deputy minister for the Commission on Legislative Democracy, a royal commission charged with re-evaluating the political system in New Brunswick.

McLaughlin was involved in many major decisions in the Lord government.

Following the completion of the commission in 2005, McLaughlin was made a deputy minister in the Executive Council Office with no particular policy role but was instead given to the Council of the Federation on loan to oversee their study of the fiscal imbalance. In 2006, he was named chief of staff to federal Minister of Finance Jim Flaherty in the new Conservative Party of Canada government.

Travel Expenses report

In 2017 in Manitoba, McLaughlin acted as "temporary director of communications and stakeholder relations" as well as "climate change advisor" for the office of Conservative Premier Brian Pallister. Controversy arose after it became public that along with his annual salary of $133,375, McLaughlin had claimed nearly $60,000 in travel expenses, mainly for hotels in Winnipeg and for flights to and from Ottawa.

Although McLaughlin listed the expenses as being for "climate change project/meetings," or "communications and stakeholder relations," Premier Pallister, while describing McLaughlin as "a respected international expert on climate change [and] sustainable development," said the expenses were paid "to help [McLaughlin] maintain touch with his two children and his wife."

Political offices
Preceded by Hugh Segal	Chief of Staff of the Prime Minister's Office; 1993	Succeeded by Jodi White
