= Jodi White =

Canadian political operative (1946–2024)

Jodi White CM

6th Chief of Staff to the Prime Minister
- In office June 25, 1993 – November 4, 1993
- Prime Minister: Kim Campbell
- Preceded by: David McLaughlin
- Succeeded by: Jean Pelletier

Personal details
- Born: Joanne White; December 27, 1946 Toronto, Ontario, Canada
- Died: February 10, 2024 (aged 77) Ottawa, Ontario, Canada
- Party: Progressive Conservative
- Education: Carleton University; University of Toronto

Joanne White CM (December 27, 1946 – February 10, 2024) was a Canadian philanthropist and political operative who served as chief of staff to the prime minister under Kim Campbell in 1993.

== Early life and education ==
White was born on December 27, 1946, in Toronto, Ontario. She studied political science at the University of Toronto's Victoria College in the mid-1960s, followed by a degree in journalism from Carleton University in Ottawa, Ontario. While at the University of Toronto, she joined the sorority Alpha Phi.

== Career ==
White's career began as a television news reporter and radio producer. She once held the post of president of the Public Policy Forum, an independent, national, non-profit organization with a mandate to promote better public policy and better public management through dialogue among leaders from the public, private, labour and voluntary sectors. She was the Vice President of corporate affairs at Imasco Ltd, the founder of Sydney House and co-founder of Neville Group.

Following the 1984 election, White was named as Joe Clark's chief of staff, who was Canada's minister of foreign affairs. In 1993, she worked on Jean Charest's campaign in the Progressive Conservative leadership race. Following Kim Campbell's election as Progressive Conservative leader and becoming prime minister, White became Campbell's chief of staff.

White was the first woman in Canadian history to lead a national election campaign. She directed the 1997 national election campaign of then Progressive Conservative Party of Canada leader Jean Charest. White also sat on the board of directors for the Canadian International Council.

White was awarded the Queen Elizabeth II Diamond Jubilee Medal in 2012. On December 13, 2013, White was invested as a Member of the Order of Canada for her role in "promoting civic dialogue in Canada [and]... social and environmental philanthropy".

White was on the board of Tides Canada, the National Theatre School, the Canadian Institute of International Affairs, the Southern Africa Education Trust Fund, Bishop's University, and Ottawa General Hospital.

== Death ==
White died from breast cancer in Toronto on February 10, 2024, at the age of 77.
