= Jean Pelletier =

Canadian politician (1935–2009)

Jean Pelletier OC, OQ

37th Mayor of Quebec City
- In office December 1, 1977 – November 5, 1989
- Preceded by: Gilles Lamontagne
- Succeeded by: Jean-Paul L'Allier

7th Chief of Staff to the Prime Minister
- In office 1993–2001
- Prime Minister: Jean Chrétien
- Preceded by: Jodi White
- Succeeded by: Percy Downe

Personal details
- Born: February 21, 1935 Chicoutimi, Quebec, Canada
- Died: January 10, 2009 (aged 73) Quebec City
- Party: Liberal
- Spouse: Hélène Bherer (m. 1961)
- Children: 2
- Education: Laval University
- Profession: Politician

Jean Pelletier, OC, OQ (French pronunciation: [ʒɑ̃ pɛltje]; February 21, 1935 – January 10, 2009) was a Canadian politician who served as the 37th mayor of Quebec City, Chief of Staff in the Prime Minister's Office, and chairman of Via Rail. He was a leading organizer of the Liberal Party of Canada.

== Early career ==
Born in Chicoutimi, Quebec, the son of Burroughs and Marie (Desautels) Pelletier, Pelletier was educated at the college des Jesuits in Quebec City and the Séminaire de Trois-Rivières. He studied social sciences at Laval University before working as a journalist with CFCM-TV in Quebec City in 1957. From 1958 to 1958, he was a correspondent with Télévision de Radio-Canada. In 1959, he was the press secretary for the Premier of Quebec, Paul Sauvé.

From 1960 to 1962, he was the executive secretary for the Commission des Monuments Historiques de la Province de Québec, a society for the listing and preserving all buildings of historical interest in the province of Quebec. From 1963 to 1964, he was a Technical Advisor to the Secretary of the Province of Quebec. Moving into the private sector, he was a broker for Levesque & Beaubien from 1964 to 1970. From 1970 to 1973, he was a vice president for Dumont Express. From 1973 to 1977, he was vice-president of Action Sociale Ltée.

== Political career ==
Pelletier began his political career with the Union Nationale, a conservative and nationalist party identifying with Quebec autonomism.

He won a seat as a municipal councillor in Quebec City in December 1976. He was elected mayor in 1977, serving for twelve years and two more elections. During his tenure as mayor, from 1977 to 1989, he improved rail service into the city, was instrumental in reviving the Lower Town and in having it designated a UNESCO World Heritage Site.

While mayor, Pelletier also became friends with Paris mayor Jacques Chirac. The two worked closely together as part of the Association of Francophone Mayors (1979–89), where Pelletier served as vice president. He successfully persuaded Chirac to keep quiet during the 1980 Quebec referendum, though Chirac personally supported an independent Quebec like General Charles de Gaulle.

With the demise of the Union Nationale, he joined the Liberal Party of Canada.

== Chief of Staff to Jean Chrétien ==
Pelletier was a longtime close ally and friend of Jean Chrétien. They knew each other for years, having first met at boarding school while still youths. They attended law school at Laval University together and earned similar reputations as being aggressive.

When Chrétien won the leadership in 1990, he was largely unpopular in Quebec, rocked by caucus defects, and indecisive in responding to the Oka standoff. The federal Liberals were disorganized, near bankruptcy, and dropped in the polls from 50 to 32 per cent. In order to reinvigorate his leadership and reorganized his chaotic office, Chrétien hired Pelletier as his chief of staff, while Eddie Goldenberg continued as senior political adviser.

Pelletier ran unsuccessfully in the Quebec City riding during the 1993 election, which saw the party capture few seats in the province of Quebec outside of their federalist stronghold of Montreal. That campaign saw Chrétien become Prime Minister, and Pelletier became his Chief of Staff, making him head of the Prime Minister's Office.

Chrétien praised Pelletier as Chief of Staff, saying "He ran a very tight–and tight-lipped–ship.... As a result, we didn't suffer from the public feuding, backbiting gossip, and anonymous leaks that had plagued other PMOs. Even those columnists and academics who were no fans of the Liberal Party had to concede that Pelletier's operation was among the most efficient and harmonious in memory, despite having been reduced from 120 to 80 employees as a cost-saving measure." Jeffrey Simpson, a columnist for The Globe and Mail, noted that "Pelletier stayed away from the media. He seldom met with journalists, and when he did, he gave almost nothing away. He was courteous, refined, sometimes witty and usually non-informative."

Pelletier persuaded two designates for Governor General, Roméo LeBlanc and Adrienne Clarkson, to marry their long-time partners, so they could be appointed as Canada's head of state.

Pelletier remained close friends with Jacques Chirac, who became President of France in 1994. Pelletier played an instrumental role in Chrétien and Chirac becoming close friends despite their initial disagreements. Chrétien had initially dismissed Chirac as a "right-wing Gaullist" and had been publicly furious when Chirac announced on Larry King Live that France would be one of the first countries to recognize an independent Quebec. Years later, when Paul Martin became prime minister and dismissed Pelletier (see below), Chirac criticized Martin for his treatment of Pelletier.

== Sponsorship Scandal and Via Rail Controversy ==
On May 4, 2001, Chrétien appointed Pelletier chairman of Via Rail, a Crown corporation. Soon after, Chrétien promised an extra C$700 million to improve Via's service.

On March 1, 2004, Pelletier and Via President Marc LeFrançois were fired by Prime Minister Paul Martin and Transport Minister Tony Valeri. Their dismissals were shortly after the Liberal Party became embroiled in the sponsorship scandal. Pelletier was one of four Chrétien loyalists sacked from jobs at Crown corporations by Martin's government during the sponsorship scandal. Via was accused of skipping mandated procedures in order to hand out contracts to Liberal-friendly firms and individuals. Pelletier, however, was not at Via for most of these occurrences, and the Martin government was accused of using an incident as an excuse to remove one of Chrétien's allies. Eddie Goldenberg said that Pelletier "was very hurt about being fired for saying something about Myriam Bédard without being asked for his side. The whole purpose [of firing him] had nothing to do with Ms. Bédard and everything to do with the fact that Mr. Martin didn't like him because he had worked for Mr. Chrétien".

Paul Martin maintained that Pelletier was fired for remarks that he made to Montreal's La Presse newspaper attacking Olympic athlete Myriam Bédard. Talking about Bédard, who had held a marketing position at Via and had gone to the media with stories of corruption, Pelletier said "I don't want to be mean, but this is a poor girl who deserves pity, who doesn't have a spouse, as far as I know." He later reiterated that "She is struggling as a single mother with economic responsibilities. Deep down, I think she is pitiful." This caused an immediate media fracas and the remarks were widely condemned as sexist and out-of-touch by women's groups, sports groups and others.

On March 30, 2004, Pelletier sued Via and the federal government for C$3 million, for defamation and illegal dismissal. A federal court ruled that dismissal did not follow due process and ordered him reinstated in November 2005. Although he was reinstated, the government appealed the court ruling and kept him off the payroll. On December 22, 2005, he was fired a second time, this time after the government ensured that due process was followed. Pelletier filed suit in Quebec Superior Court alleging wrongful dismissal; Transport Minister Jean Lapierre issued a written statement noting that the second dismissal was effective immediately and that Pelletier would not receive compensation due to his suit against the government.

After the 2006 federal election, Reg Alcock, the outgoing President of the Treasury Board, did approve $40,000 to assist Pelletier with legal fees in a court challenge against the Gomery Commission. Representatives of other parties criticized this payment, saying that the government should only cover legal costs for working civil servants. Pelletier's lawyer argued that it followed a long-standing government policy for high-ranking functionaries in judicial proceedings.

A Federal Court justice ruled in March 2007 that the Martin government acted improperly in 2005 when it fired Pelletier a second time, immediately after a court overturned his first dismissal as head of Via Rail. Justice Francois Lemieux ruled that then-Transport Minister Jean Lapierre, who fired Pelletier the second time, was biased and failed to follow proper procedures. On November 22, 2007, Judge Hélène Langlois of Quebec Superior Court ruled that government of Prime Minister Paul Martin had acted in a "cavalier and precipitous" fashion when it fired Pelletier. Langloise stated, "that behaviour doesn't meet the standard of diligence expected from a contractor when a contractual relationship is ended. It shows a total lack of consideration". Langlois also mentioned that people refused to walk on the same side of the street as Pelletier while others called him names in public. Pelletier was awarded $235,000 in lost income, and a further $100,000 for damaging his reputation. He had sued for $689,000 in financial losses and $3.3 million for moral damages.

On June 26, 2008, federal judge Max Teitelbaum criticized John Gomery for having a preoccupation with the media spotlight that led him to give interviews he should have eschewed, making comments that indicated he judged issues before all evidence was heard, exhibited bias against Mr. Chrétien, and trivialized the inquiry proceedings. For instance, Teitelbaum pointed out that Gomery's remark halfway through the hearings that "juicy stuff" was yet to come made it appear that evidence of wrongdoing was expected before it was heard. The court threw out the Gomery inquiry's conclusions that Chrétien and Pelletier bore responsibility for the sponsorship scandal.

== Death ==
Pelletier died in Quebec City on January 10, 2009, from complications of colon cancer, aged 73. He was survived by his wife, Hélène, and two children.

== Honours ==
In 1985, Pelletier was made a Member of the Order of Canada in recognition of having "played a pivotal role in many social, cultural and philanthropic organizations in the Old Capital". He was promoted to Officer in 2003 in recognition of having "dedicated his life to public service". In 1990, he was made an Officer of the National Order of Quebec.

Political offices
Preceded by Jodi White	Chief of Staff of the Prime Minister's Office; 1993–2001	Succeeded by Percy Downe
Preceded by Gilles Lamontagne	Mayor of Quebec City; 1977–1989	Succeeded by Jean-Paul L'Allier
