= Open justice =

Principle of holding legal hearings in public

Open justice is a legal principle that requires that judicial proceedings be conducted in a transparent manner and with the oversight of the people, so as to safeguard the rights of those subject to the power of the court and to allow for the scrutiny of the public in general. The term has particular emphasis in legal systems based on British law, such as in the United Kingdom, South Africa, Canada, Australia, and the United States. The term has several closely related meanings: it is seen as a fundamental right guaranteeing liberty; it describes guidelines for how courts can be more transparent; and it sometimes identifies an ideal situation. In a courtroom, it means steps to promote transparency such as letting the public see and hear trials as they happen in real time, televising trials as they happen, videotaping proceedings for later viewing, publishing the content and documents of court files, providing transcripts of statements, making past decisions available for review in an easy-to-access format, publishing decisions, and giving reporters full access to files and participants so they can report what happens. The principle includes efforts to try to make what happens in the court understandable to the public and the press.

In Canada, open justice is referred to as the open court principle.

== Background ==
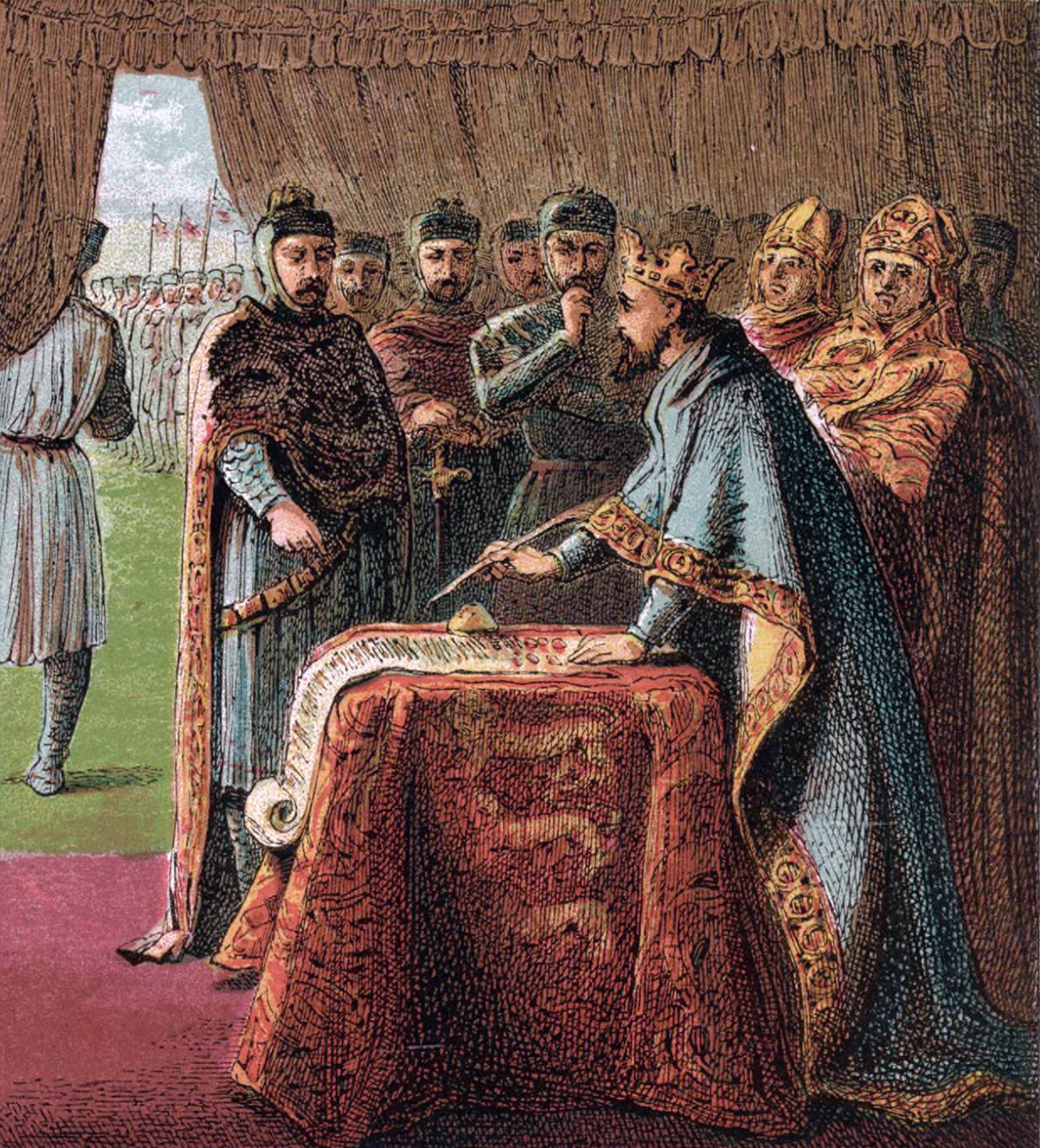
The principle of open justice has been traced to decisions made before Magna Carta.

The principle is viewed as an underlying or core principle in British law. It has a long history dating back hundreds of years, and it has been traced to decisions made before the signing of Magna Carta in 1215. Today the concept is so widely accepted that there is a general presumption that there should be judicial openness, such that openness is the rule, with secret or obscured proceedings being considered as exceptions needing to be justified. The rise of social media websites such as Facebook has opened new ways for court cases to be made public; for example, in Australia, courts have considered having websites with live videos as well as blogs by retired judges to "preserve the concepts of open justice" in the digital age. In recent years, when governments try to cope with thorny problems such as terrorism, there are concerns that the principle of open justice can be undermined relatively easily by national security concerns. There are concerns that if new secrecy guidelines harden into precedents, that it might be hard to restore the "centuries old system of open justice".

== Practical considerations ==
=== Benefits ===
Proponents of open justice assert numerous benefits. An overarching benefit is that it keeps courts behaving properly. Openness acts as a safeguard for the proper administration of justice. According to philosopher Jeremy Bentham, open justice is the "keenest spur to exertion and the surest of all guards against improbity." Knowledge that court trials are regularly public encourages further attendance by the public. Further, openness can mean more accurate decisions during a trial; for example, the proceedings can spur a witness to come forth, or encourage others to submit new evidence or dispute publicized statements. Openness reduces the chance that the judgment is a mistake or that a case might have to be re-tried because of a subsequent sanction of contempt. Proponents argue that open justice benefits democracy in a general sense because citizens can see how particular laws affect particular people, and therefore citizens are in a better position to advise lawmakers about such laws. It helps ensure public confidence in legal decision-making, according to proponents. Proponents of open justice have argued that public scrutiny permits those interested to "tap into the collective wisdom of what passes for fairness in similar cases". It facilitates a comparison of cases.

A British judge commented:

This is the reason it is so important not to forget why proceedings are required to be subjected to the full glare of a public hearing. It is necessary because the public nature of proceedings deters inappropriate behaviour on the part of the court. It also maintains the public's confidence in the administration of justice. It enables the public to know that justice is being administered impartially. It can result in evidence becoming available which would not become available if the proceedings were conducted behind closed doors or with one or more of the parties' or witnesses' identity concealed. It makes uninformed and inaccurate comment about the proceedings less likely. If secrecy is restricted to those situations where justice would be frustrated if the cloak of anonymity is not provided, this reduces the risk of the sanction of contempt having to be invoked, with the expense and the interference with the administration of justice which this can involve.

— Judge Woolf in R v Legal Aid

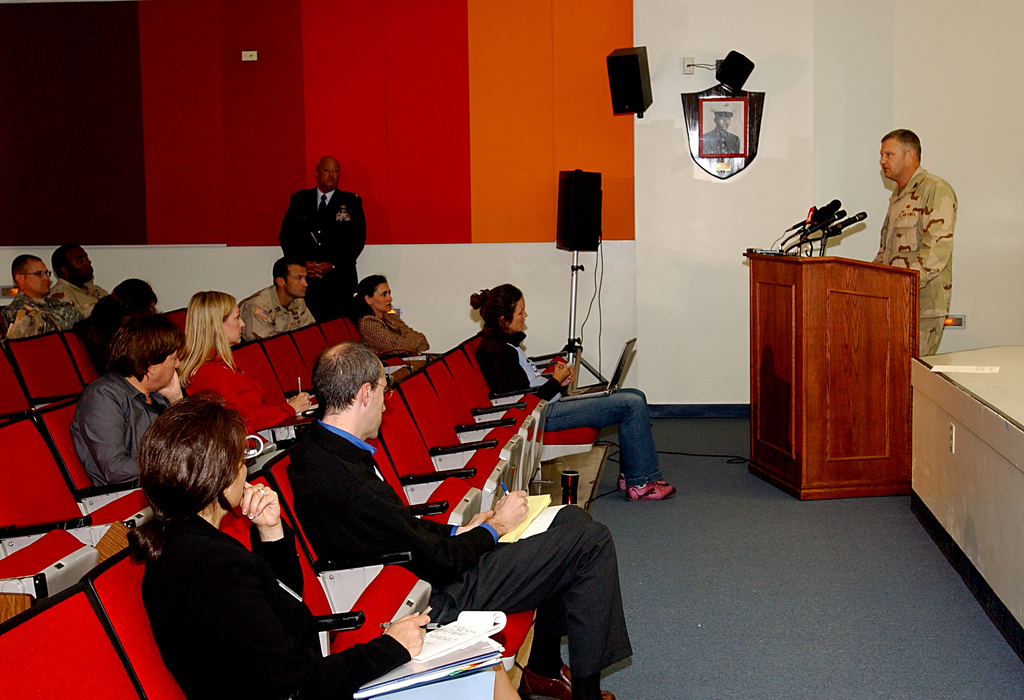
Governments trying to cope with terrorism have often sought to limit information in trials involving suspected terrorists. Photo: press conference for the Guantanamo Bay military commissions.

Still, practical considerations often mean that the ideal of open justice must be weighed against other values such as privacy and cost and national security.

=== National security concerns ===
There are some cases in which publicity in a courtroom proceeding can be detrimental. In some cases, courts have opted to keep trials secret in proceedings against persons charged with terrorism, to protect its intelligence gathering methods and contacts from exposure. In a case in Britain, in which a soldier was on trial for murdering an Afghan insurgent, there was an effort to keep the trial secret to protect him from possible future retribution, but there were calls for the identity of the soldier to be publicized based on the principle of open justice. In situations when aspects of trials are kept secret, critics favoring open justice have argued that the secrecy is not needed for national security but is "nothing more than a useful drape to cover the inconvenient or the merely embarrassing." Lawyers have often referred to the principle of open justice when disagreeing with a decision that was made, or calling for a retrial. In the United Kingdom, courts have tried to find the right balance between openness and secrecy, particularly in sensitive cases. In the United States, there have been concerns that the principle of open justice has not been applied to cases of immigrants "wrongly ensnared in the post-9/11 law enforcement dragnet" who were denied access to lawyers and relatives and sometimes deported after secret removal proceedings.

=== Privacy concerns ===
There are other factors which sometimes must be balanced against the need for open justice. For example, there are situations in which the release of confidential information such as private financial records might harm the reputation of one of the parties. In other situations, it may be necessary to protect the privacy of a minor. A further case in which openness is seen as unnecessary are when legal matters involve uncontentious information unrelated to public issues, such as the financial division of an estate after a death. Another factor sometimes working against the ideal of open justice is complexity; according to one view, court proceedings over time "have evolved into a complex system that is hard for outsiders to understand."

In the aftermath of the Bridgegate scandal in New Jersey, an appellate judge ruled against releasing the identities of some persons involved in the scandal, on the grounds of being "sensitive to the privacy and reputation interests of uncharged third parties"; that is, releasing names to the media might unfairly tarnish reputations without a trial.

Another judge commented on tradeoffs which sometimes work against openness:

A hearing, or any part of it, may be in private if publicity would defeat the object of the hearing; it involves matters relating to national security; it involves confidential information (including information relating to personal financial matters) and publicity would damage that confidentiality; a private hearing is necessary to protect the interests of any child or protected party; it is a hearing of an application made without notice and it would be unjust to any respondent for there to be a public hearing; it involves uncontentious matters arising in the administration of trusts or in the administration of a deceased person’s estate; or the court considers this to be necessary, in the interests of justice.

— Justice Tugendhat in a legal opinion.

There is an Open Justice Initiative within the legal community to make justice more transparent.

== See also ==
- Open court principle
