= Open court principle =

The open court principle requires that court proceedings presumptively be open and accessible to the public and to the media.

In contrast, in camera describes court proceedings where the public and press are not allowed to observe the procedure or process.

== Canada ==
=== Purpose ===
The virtues of openness were discussed by the Supreme Court of Canada in A.G. Nova Scotia v. MacIntyre which quoted eighteenth-century philosopher Jeremy Bentham:

In the darkness of secrecy, sinister interest and evil in every shape have full swing. Only in proportion as publicity has place can any of the checks applicable to judicial injustice operate. Where there is no publicity there is no justice. Publicity is the very soul of justice. It is the keenest spur to exertion and the surest of all guards against improbity. It keeps the judge himself while trying under trial.

According to the Supreme Court of Canada in Vancouver Sun (Re), the open court principle enhances the public's confidence in the justice system:

Public access to the courts guarantees the integrity of judicial processes by demonstrating "that justice is administered in a non-arbitrary manner, according to the rule of law". Openness is necessary to maintain the independence and impartiality of courts. It is integral to public confidence in the justice system and the public's understanding of the administration of justice. Moreover, openness is a principal component of the legitimacy of the judicial process and why the parties and the public at large abide by the decisions of courts.

The open court principle is linked to the freedom of expression and freedom of the press which include the right of the public to receive information. The press plays a vital role as the conduit through which the public receives information regarding the operation of public institutions.

=== Canadian legislation ===
Section 135(1) of the Courts of Justice Act (Ontario) states the general principle that "all court hearings shall be open to the public".

Subsection 486(1) of the Criminal Code states: "Any proceedings against an accused shall be held in open court, but where the presiding judge, provincial court judge or justice, as the case may be, is of the opinion that it is in the interest of public morals, the maintenance of order or the proper administration of justice to exclude all or any members of the public from the court room for all or part of the proceedings, he may so order."

=== Canadian jurisprudence ===
==== CBC v New Brunswick AG ====
In 1996, the Supreme Court of Canada ruled that Subsection 486(1) of the Criminal Code, allowing judges to exclude the public and press from the courtroom, was constitutional per the reasonable limits clause of the Charter of Rights and Freedoms. It also ruled that the Canadian Broadcasting Corporation should not have been excluded from the courtroom for parts of the sentencing in a sexual assault trial when the accused's acts were discussed; the court ruled that the judge failed to prove that the exclusion was necessary and that allowing the CBC to be present during that time would not result in undue hardship.

==== Vancouver Sun (Re) ====
In 2004, the Vancouver Sun newspaper successfully argued that certain court proceedings in relation to the Air India terrorist attack should be open to the public. Section 83.28 of the Criminal Code allows the exclusion of the public and media from certain court proceedings in relation to terrorism offences.

==== Sherman Estate v Donovan ====
In 2021, the Supreme Court of Canada ruled against the estate of Barry and Honey Sherman finding the risk to the important public interest in privacy, on the facts of the case was not serious. Showing that privacy concerns, including dignity, may necessitate an exception to the open court principle.

=== Limits on the open court principle in Canada ===
The Supreme Court of Canada has made clear that a trial should only have a closed court in cases where closing the court is in the public interest. These proven cases include matters of maintaining personal dignity, terrorism offences, and protecting the privacy of minors.

== United Kingdom ==
The open court principle has long been recognized as a cornerstone of the common law. In its 1913 decision in Scott v Scott, the House of Lords noted the right of public access to the courts is “one of principle ... turning, not on convenience, but on necessity". Viscount Haldane L.C., noted that “Justice is not a cloistered virtue”.

In the 1936 decision of Ambard v Attorney-General for Trinidad and Tobago, Lord Atkin noted “Publicity is the very soul of justice. It is the keenest spur to exertion, and the surest of all guards against improbity.”

== Ukraine ==
Since 2014, Ukraine has allowed videotaping of court sessions without obtaining the specific permission of the judge, within the limitations established by law. In 2015 the Open Court Project launched with the aim of videotaping court proceedings in civil, commercial, administrative cases. The Open Court Project has videotaped over 7000 court cases in courts at different levels. The videos are stored, indexed and published in the public domain.

In 2017 NGO Open Ukraine has launched the VR Court Project aimed at videotaping court sessions with 3D 360 degree portable video cameras to create VR video records of court sessions.

== See also ==
- Freedom of speech
- Freedom of the press
- In camera
- Judicial independence
- Open justice
- Public trial
- Publication bans
- Secret trial
- Hoax
