= Marc LeFrançois =

Canadian business executive (born 1939)

Marc LeFrançois (born 1939) is a Canadian business executive. He was the president of Via Rail until March 5, 2004, when he was fired in connection with the sponsorship scandal. He was a board member from 1997 to 2002, and replaced Rod Morrison as CEO of Via Rail in November 2000.
