= Max M. Teitelbaum =

Max Mortimer Teitelbaum

Deputy Judge of the Federal Court of Canada

Personal details
- Born: January 27, 1932 (age 94) Montreal, Quebec
- Education: McGill University

Max M. Teitelbaum (born January 27, 1932) is a former judge of the Federal Court of Canada. He was appointed in 1985 and retired in 2007. He was the first Jewish judge of the Federal Court of Canada. He is a graduate of the McGill University Faculty of Law, where he served as the Comment Editor for the McGill Law Journal.
