= Sponsorship scandal =

2000s Canadian government scandal

The sponsorship scandal, AdScam or Sponsorgate, was a scandal in Canada that came as a result of a federal government "sponsorship program" in the province of Quebec involving the Liberal Party of Canada, which was in power from 1993 to 2006.

The program was originally established as an effort to raise awareness of the Government of Canada's (then led by Prime Minister Jean Chrétien) contributions to Quebec industries and other activities in order to counter the actions of the Parti Québécois government of the province that worked to promote Quebec independence. The program ran from 1996 until 2004, when broad corruption was discovered in its operations and it was discontinued.. Illicit and even illegal activities within the administration of the program were revealed, involving misuse and misdirection of public funds intended for government advertising in Quebec. Such misdirections included sponsorship money awarded to Liberal Party-linked ad firms in return for little or no work, in which firms maintained Liberal organizers or fundraisers on their payrolls or donated back part of the money to the Liberal Party. The resulting investigations and scandal affected the Liberal Party and the then-government of Prime Minister Paul Martin.

Though an ongoing affair for years, it rose to national prominence in early 2004 after the program was examined by Auditor General Sheila Fraser, who found significant concerns. Her revelations led to the Martin government establishing the Gomery Commission, formally the Commission of Inquiry into the Sponsorship Program and Advertising Activities, headed by Justice John Gomery for the purpose of conducting a public inquiry and filing a report on the matter. The Commission concluded that $2 million was awarded in contracts without a proper bidding system, $250,000 was added to one contract price for no additional work, and $1.5 million was awarded for work that was never done, of which $1.14 million was repaid. The Commission found that a number of rules in the Financial Administration Act were broken. The overall operating cost of the commission was $14 million.

In the national spotlight, the scandal became a significant factor in the lead-up to the 2006 federal election when, after more than 12 years in power, the Liberals were defeated by the Conservatives, who formed a minority government that was sworn in February 2006.

== Notable people involved ==
- Jean Chrétien — Prime Minister of Canada (1993-2003) at the time that the Sponsorship Program was established and operated. The Gomery Commission's First Phase Report, which assigned blame for the Sponsorship scandal, cast most of the indemnity for misspent public funds and fraud on Chrétien and the Prime Minister's Office (PMO) staff, though it cleared Chrétien himself of direct wrongdoing. On 26 June 2008, the Federal Court quashed the Gomery Inquiry's conclusions that Chrétien and Pelletier bore responsibility for the sponsorship scandal. This decision was later upheld by the Federal Court of Appeal.
- Chuck Guité — bureaucrat in charge of the sponsorship program, who was arrested for fraud by the RCMP and convicted on five counts on 6 June 2006.
- Jean Pelletier — Chrétien's Chief of Staff (1990-2001; 1993-2001 for the PMO) and chairman of Via Rail (2001-2004). Guité testified that he regularly received instructions from Pelletier during his time at the PMO about what programs to spend sponsorship money on and how much, a claim that Justice Gomery found to be truthful. Via Rail was accused of mishandling sponsorship deals, though mostly not under Pelletier's tenure.
- Alfonso Gagliano — Minister of Public Works (1997-2002) who was in charge of the program. He was also the Quebec lieutenant between 1999 and 2002, making him in charge of Liberal Party operations in Quebec.
- André Ouellet — member of Prime Minister Chrétien's Cabinet, longtime Liberal politician and later head of Canada Post, who was also accused of violating sponsorship rules.
- Jean Carle — long-time close associate of Chrétien's, going back to the 1980s, and generally viewed as Chrétien's "surrogate son." Carle served as the chief of operations at the PMO between 1993-1998 and as a senior executive at the Crown-owned Business Development Bank of Canada (BDC) between 1998 and 2001. Guité testified that besides for Pelletier that he sometimes also received his orders from Carle during his time at the PMO. During his time at the BDC, Carle testified at the Gomery commission that he created a $125,000 phony paper trail to hide a sponsorship deal, a tactic that Gomery compared to money laundering.
- Jean Brault — head of Groupaction Marketing, one of the companies to which deals were directed. He was arrested for fraud by the RCMP, pleading guilty to five counts of fraud and on May 5, 2006, was sentenced to 30 months in prison.
- Jacques Corriveau — Liberal organizer and head of Pluridesign to which millions in sponsorship dollars were directed.
- Paul Martin — Minister of Finance and Senior Minister from Quebec during most of the years the program occurred. Martin later became Prime Minister of Canada (2003-2006); when he became Prime Minister in December 2003, he claimed that he put a halt to it. He also set up the Gomery Commission which later cleared him of formal responsibility in the "First Phase Report". The Gomery findings found that Martin, as finance minister, established a "fiscal framework" but he did not have oversight as to the dispersal of the funds once they were apportioned to Chrétien's PMO. A report on the issue by the Auditor General's Office of Sheila Fraser came to the same conclusion. Nonetheless, Martin was accused of tying Gomery's hands and using the sponsorship scandal as an excuse to purge the Liberals of members who supported Chrétien. The scandal played a factor in the federal election of 2006 and the fall of the Liberal Government. Shortly thereafter, Martin resigned from the liberal party leadership.
- Joe Morselli — Liberal Party fundraiser. Jean Brault testified that the money exchanges were with Morselli.
- Jean Lafleur — former CEO of Lafleur Communication Marketing Inc. One of the advertising executives that accepted money from the federal government. Pleaded guilty to 28 counts of fraud.
- Allan Cutler — former civil servant and whistleblower who reported anomalies in the Canadian sponsorship program, triggering the scandal.

== Timeline of events ==
=== Prior to AG report ===
Year	Event
1996	Ernst & Young conducts an audit of contracting and tendering practices. The initial draft, which identified recurring problems and the risk of legal action, was altered in the final report. Ernst & Young representative Deanne Monaghan later indicated that she did not recall why the report had been changed to remove those references.
2000	February – An internal audit reveals that none of the recommendations of the 1996 Ernst & Young audit have been implemented. September – Minister Alfonso Gagliano receives the 2000 audit and suspends the Sponsorship Program. Later that year, the Office of the Auditor General of Canada begins investigating the program.
2002	March – The Globe and Mail reports that the government had paid CA$550,000 to Groupaction Marketing Inc. for a report that no one could find. The government responds by asking Auditor General Sheila Fraser to look into its dealings with Groupaction. May 8 – Fraser issues a report accusing "senior public servants" of having broken "just about every rule in the book" in awarding contracts worth $1.6 million to the Groupaction ad firm. Fraser promises a follow-up report on the sponsorship program due in early 2004.
2003	December – Paul Martin becomes Prime Minister of Canada. He sets out to distance himself from the scandal: he cancels the sponsorship program, establishes new controls on government spending, and decides that the government will sue various individuals and corporations that had over-billed the government.

=== AG report (2004–2007) ===
Date	Event
2004
February 10	Auditor General Sheila Fraser's report is tabled, revealing up to $100 million of the $250 million sponsorship program was awarded to Liberal-friendly advertising firms and Crown corporations for little or no work.
February 11	Prime Minister Paul Martin orders a Commission of Inquiry into the Sponsorship Program and Advertising Activities. The Commission of Inquiry will be headed by Justice John H. Gomery. Martin fires Alfonso Gagliano, Minister of Public Works and the minister responsible for the program, from his post as ambassador to Denmark. Martin asserts that he had no knowledge of the scandal prior to the Auditor General's report.
February 13	The National Post newspaper publishes a 2002 letter leaked to it by an unidentified third party, between the Liberal Party's then National Policy Chairman and Paul Martin, urging Martin to stop partisan financial abuses in the Sponsorship Program, thereby casting doubt on Martin's defence of personal ignorance.
February 24	Martin suspends Business Development Bank of Canada president Michel Vennat, Via Rail president Marc LeFrançois and Canada Post president André Ouellet giving each an ultimatum to defend themselves or face further disciplinary action.
February 27	Former Olympic gold medallist Myriam Bédard reveals she was pushed from her job at Via Rail for questioning billing practices. Via Rail chairman Jean Pelletier publicly belittles Bédard and calls her pitiful.
March 1	Pelletier is fired.
March 3	Jean Carle, a close confidant of Chrétien and his former director of operations, surfaces in close connection to the sponsorship initiative.
March 5	LeFrançois is fired.
March 11	Allan Cutler, former public works accountant, testifies before the Commission of Inquiry. He places responsibility for the program and its irregularities with Chuck Guité.
March 12	Vennat is fired.
March 13	An unidentified whistle-blower reveals that high-ranking government officials, including Jean Pelletier, Alfonso Gagliano, Don Boudria, Denis Coderre, and Marc LeFrançois, had frequent confidential conversations with Pierre Tremblay, head of the Communications Coordination Services Branch of Public Works from 1999 until 2001. The claim is the first direct link between the scandal and the Prime Minister's Office. Coderre and LeFrançois denied the allegation.
March 18	Gagliano testifies in front of the Public Accounts Committee, a committee of the House of Commons chaired by a member from the Official Opposition. Gagliano denies any involvement by himself or any other politician; he points blame at bureaucrat Chuck Guité.
March 24	Myriam Bédard testifies at the Public Accounts Committee. In addition to repeating her earlier assertions, she also claims that Formula One driver Jacques Villeneuve was given a secret $12 million payoff to wear a Canadian flag logo on his racing suit (however, Villeneuve sharply denies this allegation, calling it "ludicrous"). Bédard also testifies that she once heard that Groupaction was involved in drug trafficking.
April 2	Previously confidential testimony from a 2002 inquiry into suspicious Groupaction contracts is made public. In it, Guité admits to having bent the rules in his handling of the advertising contracts but defends his actions as excusable given the circumstances, saying, "We were basically at war trying to save the country... When you're at war, you drop the book and the rules and you don't give your plan to the opposition."
April 22	Guité testifies, claiming Auditor-General Fraser is misguided in delivering the report, as it distorts what actually went on; he claims the office of then-Finance Minister Paul Martin lobbied for input in the choice of firms given contracts; and he denies that any political interference occurred, because his bureaucratic office made all final decisions. Opposition MPs decry his comments as "nonsense" and claim he is covering up for the government. The French language press gives a very different account of Guité's testimony; a La Presse headline states that Guité is involving the Cabinet office of Paul Martin.
May 6	An official announces the inquiry deadline is set for December 2005.
May 10	Jean Brault, president of Groupaction, and Charles Guité are arrested by the RCMP for fraud in connection with the sponsorship scandal.
May 23	Paul Martin requests that the Governor General dissolve Parliament and call a federal election.
May 28	Alfonso Gagliano launches a lawsuit for $4.5 million against Prime Minister Paul Martin and the federal government for defamation and wrongful dismissal claiming that he has been unfairly made to pay for the sponsorship scandal.
June 28	The Liberals win 135 of 308 seats in the 2004 election, forming the first minority government in almost 25 years.
September 7	First public hearings of the Gomery Commission begin in Ottawa. They will move to Montreal in February 2005 and are planned to conclude in the Spring.
December	In a year-end media interview, Justice John Gomery refers to Chrétien's distribution of autographed golf balls as "small-town cheap," which later prompts an indignant response from the former prime minister.
2005
March 29	A publication ban is imposed by the Gomery commission on Jean Brault's testimony.
April 2	American blogger Ed Morrissey of Captain's Quarters discloses information about Brault's testimony, countervening the Canadian publication ban. Until the revocation of the ban five days later, the publication itself was a news event in Canada, with Canadian news media struggling to report on the disclosure without putting themselves at risk of legal action.
April 7	The publication ban on Jean Brault's testimony is lifted by the Gomery commission. Brault's testimony triggers a rapid shift in the public opinion of the Liberal Party. Whether or not the government is defeated in the imminent confidence vote, most political pundits predict an election call this year—many predicting by this summer.
April 20	The official opposition party, the Conservatives, puts forward a non-confidence motion in the government. Due to procedural rules, this vote, which was to be held May 3, was postponed. If a non-confidence motion passes, the government will be dissolved and a new election will be held.
April 21	In an effort to prevent the defeat of his government, Prime Minister Paul Martin appears on national television to discuss the scandal. (This was highly unusual in Canadian politics.) The Prime Minister announces that a general election will be called within 30 days of Gomery's final report. He also emphasizes that he was trying to clean up the scandal and had not been involved. In the following rebuttal speeches, Jack Layton of the New Democratic Party offered to keep the parliament alive, provided the Liberal Party makes some major concessions in the budget in their favor. However, the other Opposition parties were still ready to bring down the government and force an election before the summer.
May 10	The Conservatives and Bloc Québécois win a vote, by 153–150, in the House of Commons on what they argue is equivalent to a no-confidence motion; three MPs are absent for health reasons. The motion ordered a committee of the House of Commons to declare that the government should resign rather than being a direct motion on the House's confidence in the government. The opposition parties and several constitutional experts claim that the motion is binding and that the government must resign or immediately seek the confidence of the House; the government and several opposing constitutional experts suggest that this motion was merely procedural and therefore cannot be considered a matter of confidence. Ultimately, only the Governor General has the power to force an election, it is not clear what actions tradition would require her to take in such a case.
May 11	The government tells the House that it will consider a vote to be held on May 19 on the budget, including the concessions which the Liberal party ceded to the NDP in turn for their support on it, to be a matter of confidence. The government refuses to directly seek the confidence of the House and blocks the Opposition from putting any vote to the House; in consequence the Opposition continues a policy of non-cooperation and disruption of the other business of the House.
May 17	Conservative MP Belinda Stronach crosses the floor to the Liberals and is simultaneously given the Cabinet position of Minister of Human Resources and Skills Development as well as made Minister responsible for Democratic Renewal. Prime Minister Paul Martin states that Stronach will be responsible for implementing the recommendations of the Gomery commission, a statement that Opposition critics claim casts doubt on the sincerity of the Prime Minister's promise for an election within 30 days of the tabling of Justice Gomery's report. For some time afterwards, media attention is focused away from Gomery testimony onto Stronach's move and its implications on the budget vote.
May 19	The government passes the first of two budget bills easily after the Conservatives promise support, but the second bill with the NDP concessions ends as a cliffhanger. Speaker Peter Milliken breaks a 152–152 tie in favour of the bill, keeping the government alive.
June 17	The Gomery Commission holds its final public hearings
November 1	Gomery's preliminary report into the scandal is released. The report criticizes Chrétien and his office for setting up the sponsorship program in a way as to invite abuse, and Gagliano as the Minister of Public Works for his behaviour. Prime Minister Paul Martin is formally cleared of any responsibility or wrongdoing in the matter as Gomery found his role as Finance Minister was to set up a 'fiscal framework' at the instruction of then Prime Minister Chrétien, but did not have oversight on the spending of the funds after they were passed to Chrétien's Prime Minister's Office. Conservative leader Stephen Harper and Bloc Québécois leader Gilles Duceppe announce their intention to try to force a pre-Christmas election; however, New Democrat leader Jack Layton says that he will try to have the Liberals implement some New Democrat policies, particularly with regard to a ban on private healthcare as the price for his support in keeping the government up.
November 28	The Liberals refuse to agree to the New Democrats' terms and the latter withdraws their support. The Liberals also turn down a motion sponsored by the three opposition parties which would have scheduled a February election in return for passing several key pieces of legislation. As a result, the Liberal government loses a confidence vote in the House by 171 to 133, resulting in the fall of the minority government and triggering a mid-January election after a long holiday election campaign.
2006
January 23	After twelve consecutive years in power, the ruling Liberals are defeated in the general election. The Conservatives have enough seats to form a minority government. Paul Martin immediately announces that he will not contest the next federal election as party leader, and Bill Graham is appointed interim parliamentary leader.
February 1	Justice John Gomery delivers his final report consisting mostly of recommendations for changes to the civil service and its relation to government.
February 6	The new Conservative government, led by Stephen Harper, are sworn in as the new government in Canada. Stephen Harper becomes Canada's 22nd Prime Minister.
March 18	Paul Martin resigns the leadership of the Liberal party, handing the post to Bill Graham for the interim.
May 5	after pleading guilty to five counts of fraud, Jean Brault was sentenced to 30 months in prison.
May 11	the Conservative government is reportedly preparing to file a lawsuit against the Liberal party.
June 6	Chuck Guité was convicted on five counts of defrauding the Government of Canada; on June 19, he was sentenced to 42 months in prison.
2007
April 27	Jean Lafleur, after returning from two years in Belize, pleaded guilty to 28 counts of fraud. He was sentenced to 42 months in prison, and was ordered to repay $1.6 million to the federal government.
2008
June 26	The Federal Court rules that Gomery had displayed bias in several comments made before the hearings had closed and that his remarks showed that he had prejudged the issues. According to the court, Gomery had insulted Chrétien when he described the distribution of golf balls bearing the prime minister's signature as "small-town cheap." The court voided those sections of Gomery's report dealing with Chrétien and Pelletier.

== The Gomery Commission ==
The Gomery Commission, formally the Commission of Inquiry into the Sponsorship Program and Advertising Activities, was a federal commission of inquiry, with Justice John Gomery as the sole commissioner, established for the purpose of investigating the sponsorship scandal, which involved allegations of corruption within the Canadian government.

The commission was called by then-Prime Minister Paul Martin in February 2004 soon after a report by the Auditor General of Canada found unexplainable irregularities in the government's Sponsorship Program. The Commission held public hearings from 7 September 2004 to 17 June 2005, hearing from 172 witnesses.

Gomery released his Phase I Report on the scandal on 1 November 2005 and Phase II Report on 1 February 2006.

In 2008, Federal Court of Canada Judge Max M. Teitelbaum set aside Gomery's conclusion that Jean Chrétien and Jean Pelletier shared blame for the mismanagement of the program to boost the federal government's profile in Quebec. Teitelbaum's decision was appealed to the Federal Court of Appeal where it was upheld.

=== Mandate ===
The commission had a broader mandate, more power and greater resources than the Auditor General, and most importantly could look beyond government to the advertising agencies that had received the Sponsorship dollars. The terms of reference allowed the commissioner to question witnesses, hire experts and adopt any procedures or methods that he considers expedient for the proper conduct of the inquiry. The purpose given was to "investigate and report on questions raised, directly or indirectly" by the Auditor General's report. However, as is typically the case in commissions of inquiry, he was specifically directed not to make any conclusions or recommendations on criminal charges or civil liability.

Commissioner Gomery was given a two part mandate with power issued to him under the Inquiries Act. The first part of the mandate was investigate and report on questions and concerns addressed in the "2003 Report of the Auditor General of Canada" relating to the sponsorship program and advertising activities of the Government of Canada. These concerns included the program's creation, the selection of agencies, the program's management and activities, the receiving and use of funds and disbursement of commissions, and anything else that Gomery feels relevant.

The second part of the mandate was for Gomery to make any recommendations that he considers advisable, based on his findings. Specifically requested of Gomery were the following: to prevent mismanagement of sponsorship or advertising programs in the future, taking into account legislation to protect "whistleblowers"; to recommend changes to legislation to change the governance of Crown corporations to ensure that audit committees are strengthened, that public access to information is increased, that there is a consistent application of the provisions for each organization, that compliance and enforcement be enhanced, and finally that respective responsibilities and accountabilities of Ministers and public servants as recommended by the Auditor General of Canada.

=== Proceedings and testimonies ===
The Gomery Commission began holding public hearings on 7 September 2004 in Ottawa, meeting in the Old City Hall. The first to testify was Auditor General Sheila Fraser who reported the findings of her earlier investigations. The first part of its investigation was of the political direction of the project. Most of the top officials involved were called to testify.

Testimony confirmed the Auditor General's conclusion that advertising firms submitted invoices for work that had not been done. Witnesses also reported that companies were asked to make cash contributions to the Liberal Party of Canada's Québec wing and to put Liberal workers on company payrolls.

In an unprecedented event, the inquiry saw the testimony of two Prime Ministers in February 2005: then-Finance Minister Paul Martin and then-Prime Minister Jean Chrétien. The latter's testimony was much anticipated as this was the first time in over a century that a sitting Canadian prime minister testified before a public inquiry.

Chrétien defended the program as an important component of the government's efforts to raise federal visibility in Québec. Prior to his testimony, Chrétien's lawyers moved to expel Justice Gomery in December 2004 due to several comments he had made to a National Post reporter before the hearings that demonstrated Gomery's bias against Chrétien. These included Gomery commenting that golf balls marked with Chrétien's name, which had been paid for by the sponsorship program, were "small town cheap." Gomery rejected the calls to recuse himself setting up a confrontation between him and Chrétien. At the end of his day of testimony Chrétien closed his statement by pulling out a series of golf balls bearing the name of American presidents and the law firm Ogilvie Renault (which at the time employed former Prime Minister Brian Mulroney, Gomery commission counsel Bernard Roy and Gomery's own daughter) asking whether each of them was "small town cheap." The stunt was the focus of all the media reports.

Martin appeared a few days following Chrétien, and denied any involvement in the program.

After the prime ministers testified, the hearings moved to Montreal to investigate where the money had gone. The hearings in Ottawa had uncovered little more than what was in the Auditor General's report. The AG did not have the authority to investigate outside of the government, and the look into the advertising companies in Montreal uncovered a great deal of new and explosive allegations. The most important of these were by Groupaction executive Jean Brault who recounted a series of crimes committed to direct government money to Liberal party supporters. These caused a sharp fall in the support for the governing Liberals, and put their government in jeopardy.

=== Reports ===
==== Phase I Report ====
On 1 November 2005, Gomery released the Phase I Report. Gomery criticized Chrétien and his chief of staff Jean Pelletier but cleared them of direct involvement in kickback schemes. While people such as Alfonso Gagliano, Chuck Guité and Jacques Corriveau took advantage of the programme, Gomery argued that abuses would not have occurred had Chrétien set the programme with safeguards in place. Gomery said that Pelletier "failed to take the most elementary precautions against mismanagement – and Mr. Chrétien was responsible for him."

Gomery also exonerated Prime Minister Paul Martin, the minister of finance during most of the sponsorship programme. Gomery specifically said that Martin "is entitled, like other ministers from the Quebec caucus, to be exonerated from any blame for carelessness or misconduct," as the Department of Finance's role was not oversight, but setting the "fiscal framework."

==== Phase II Report ====
On 1 February 2006, Gomery released his final report consisting mostly of recommendations for changes to the civil service and its relation to government.

The recommendations suggested include:

- Moving more responsibility to Parliamentary committees
- Stiffer penalties for violation in public spending legislation
- De-politicize civil service and crown corporation appointments
- More transparency with allocation of reserve funds
- Ban on destruction of documents

Shortly after Justice Gomery held a press conference, Prime Minister-designate Stephen Harper, elected on January 23, 2006, told the press that some of the commission's recommendations matched his proposed first bill, the Federal Accountability Act. Other recommendations went further than what Harper promised, while some other recommendations (dealing with the public service) would not be enacted in the short term.

=== Criticisms ===
Many commentators criticized the report for various reasons: alleged bias on the part of the commission, the terms of reference with which it was set up, and the use of evidence in the report. Several, including former Prime Minister Jean Chrétien, Warren Kinsella, and former cabinet minister Sheila Copps, criticized the commission as being little more than an extension of Liberal party infighting.

Gomery was accused by some as being friendly to Paul Martin, and hostile toward Chrétien. In the spring of 2005, Chrétien's lawyers attempted unsuccessfully to have Gomery removed due to his alleged bias. Subsequent to the release of the first report, Chrétien took action in Federal Court to review the commission report on the grounds that Gomery displayed a "reasonable apprehension of bias," and that some conclusions did not have an "evidentiary" basis.

On 26 June 2008, Federal Court ruled that Gomery had in fact displayed bias in several comments made before the hearings had closed and that his remarks showed that he had prejudged the issues. According to the Court, Gomery had insulted Chrétien when he described the distribution of golf balls bearing the prime minister's signature as "small-town cheap." The court voided those sections of Gomery's report dealing with Chrétien and Pelletier. Other comments by Gomery that Chrétien's lawyers argued as being indicative of bias included Gomery referring to the management of the sponsorship program as "catastrophically bad" and calling Chuck Guité a "charming scamp."

Other allegations of bias concern the commission's chief counsel, Bernard Roy, a former Chief of Staff to former Progressive Conservative Prime Minister Brian Mulroney. Roy is also a partner in Mulroney's law firm where Gomery's daughter works. Chrétien's lawyers stated that the appointment is a conflict of interest. Roy is a longtime personal friend of the former prime-minister's. Brian Mulroney and Jean Chrétien have had an adversarial personal relationship in recent years since the Airbus affair. The choice of counsel may account for the failure to call some Chrétien friendly witnesses.

Conservative leader Stephen Harper was sympathetic to Chrétien's complaints of bias, stating that the main problem was that the commission's terms of reference did not allow it to investigate Paul Martin's contracting habits as finance minister.

Chrétien's lawyers have indicated they are concerned about conclusions which are not based on evidence, but mere extrapolation. Chrétien, on the day the report was tabled in the House of Commons, objected to the findings of the commission, commenting that Gomery believed the wrong witnesses. "Personally, I believe Jean Pelletier, a man who dedicated his life to the service of his city, his province and his country," said the former Prime Minister, dismissing Chuck Guité's testimony. Chrétien believes that Gomery's conclusion that the programme was run out of the Prime Minister's Office is wrong.

=== Appeal to Federal Court ===
After the release of the first report, Chrétien's lawyers took action in Federal Court to invalidate the report and clear his name. They want the court to review the commission report on the grounds that Gomery showed a "reasonable apprehension of bias", and that some conclusions didn't have an "evidentiary" basis.

On 26 June 2008, Federal Court ruled that Gomery had in fact displayed bias in several comments made before the hearings had closed and that his remarks showed that he had prejudged the issues. According to the Court, Gomery had personally insulted Chrétien when he described the distribution of golf balls bearing the prime minister's signature as "small-town cheap." The court voided those sections of Gomery's report dealing with Chrétien and Pelletier.

The Federal Court also quashed the Gomery Inquiry's conclusions that Chrétien and Pelletier bore responsibility for the sponsorship scandal. Justice Max Teitelbaum criticized Gomery for having a preoccupation with the media spotlight that led him to give interviews he should have eschewed, making comments that indicated he judged issues before all evidence was heard, exhibited bias against Chrétien, and trivialized the inquiry proceedings. For instance, Teitelbaum pointed out that Gomery's remark halfway through the hearings that "juicy stuff" was yet to come made it appear that evidence of wrongdoing was expected before it was heard.

The federal government was ordered to pay Chrétien's legal costs. Chrétien and his aides have described it as vindication. Teitelbaum's decision was appealed to the Federal Court of Appeal where it was upheld.

== See also ==
- List of Canadian political scandals
- Politics of Canada
