= John Gomery =

Canadian judge (1932–2021)

John Gomery QC

Justice of the Quebec Superior Court
- In office 1982 – August 9, 2007

Personal details
- Born: August 9, 1932 Montreal, Quebec
- Died: May 18, 2021 (aged 88)
- Spouse: Pierrette Rayle (m. 1973)
- Education: McGill University

John Howard Gomery QC (August 9, 1932 – May 18, 2021) was a Canadian jurist from Quebec. He was a Justice of the Quebec Superior Court from 1982 to 2007, and appointed Commissioner for the Royal Commission investigating the Sponsorship scandal in 2004.

== Early life ==
Gomery was born in Montreal, Quebec, on August 9, 1932, the third of four children to Jean (née Brook) and Walter Bertram Gomery. Gomery's father was a stockbroker who had lost his savings during the Great Depression. Growing up the in anglophone community of Montreal West, Gomery did not encounter francophone culture until attending McGill University at 18. Gomery completed his education at McGill, receiving a Bachelor of Arts (BA) degree in 1953, and his Bachelor of Civil Law (BCL) in 1956. While attending McGill, Gomery was a member of the McGill Law Journal.

== Legal career ==
In 1957, Gomery was called to the Quebec Bar and worked at the law firm Fasken, Martineau and Dumoulin in the areas of family law, commercial litigation and bankruptcy. Gomery focused primarily on divorce law which required a decree from the Senate of Canada at the time. François Perreault notes that family law was not a common specialty in the 1950s, and was poorly regarded by the legal profession. He became a partner in 1966. In 1972, he was appointed Queen's Counsel (QC).

In 1982, Gomery was appointed to Quebec Superior Court Montreal district by Minister of Justice Mark MacGuigan.

Gomery served as Chair of the Copyright Board of Canada from 1999 to 2005. Gomery has also been involved in the Canadian Bar Association and Chambre des notaires du Québec. He was also President of the Comité Général des Juges de la Cour supérieure du Québec, President of the Family Law Committee from 1983 to 1993, and has been a member of the Rules of Practice Committee since its inception.

Gomrey retired from the court bench on August 9, 2007, after turning 75, the age of mandatory retirement.

== Gomery Commission ==
Gomery was appointed on February 19, 2004 as Commissioner of Inquiry into the Sponsorship Program and Advertising Activities (informally, the Gomery Commission) to investigate the Sponsorship scandal. Gomery's mandate is set by Section IV, clause I of the Inquiries Act which states: "The Commissioner [is] directed to perform his or her duties without expressing any conclusion or recommendation regarding the civil or criminal liability of any person or organization and to ensure that the conduct of the inquiry does not jeopardize any ongoing criminal investigation or criminal proceedings." In other words, Gomery's mandate was only to determine whether there were problems with the federal sponsorship program in Quebec between 1995 and 2003; he was explicitly forbidden to name any individuals or organizations that may have been responsible for the alleged fraud that occurred during the sponsorship program. Gomery's report, available in several parts e.g. Restoring Accountability: Recommendations, assisted the Royal Canadian Mounted Police with further investigations, which led to criminal charges being filed and prosecuted against certain key figures in the scandal.

He has been criticized by many, in particular Chrétien supporters, who saw his dealings in the commission as biased. Others also criticized Gomery's terms of reference which did not allow the inquiry to investigate Paul Martin's contracting habits as finance minister.

In 2005, the Canadian Press named Gomery Newsmaker of the Year. Time magazine also named him its Canadian Newsmaker of the Year.

Jean Chrétien went to federal court to clear his name and have the Gomery report invalidated. On June 26, 2008, federal judge Max Teitelbaum criticized Gomery for making comments that indicated he judged issues before all evidence was heard and exhibited bias against Chrétien. The federal judge also ruled that Gomery's comments on "small town cheap" amounted to a personal insult against Chrétien. The court criticized the Gomery inquiry's conclusions that Chrétien and Jean Pelletier bore responsibility for the sponsorship scandal.

== Family life ==
Gomery married Marjorie Lee (Sooky) Black in 1956. They had three children, Geoffrey, Cymry, and Sally. They divorced in 1972. He married Pierrette Rayle in 1973 who had started as a new hire at Gomery's firm of Martineau Walker in 1969. Rayle was appointed to the Superior Court of Quebec on May 9, 1995, making them the first couple to serve as Superior Court judges in Quebec. They had one child together, Elizabeth.

Gomery was diagnosed with Leukemia in the early 2000s which was successfully treated.

Gomery's daughter Sally A. Gomery was appointed to the Ontario Superior Court of Justice on July 1, 2017 and then to the Ontario Court of Appeal on November 6, 2023. Gomery's son Geoffrey B. Gomery was appointed to the Supreme Court of British Columbia on June 15, 2018 and then to the BC Court of Appeal on November 12, 2024.

== Later life ==
Gomery suffered two strokes between 2020 and 2021 and then contracted COVID-19. He made the decision to obtain medical assistance in dying and died on May 18, 2021.
