= Charles Guité =

Senior Canadian bureaucrat and convicted fraudster

J. Charles (Chuck) Guité (born 1943 or 1944 in Dugas, New Brunswick), raised in Campbellton, New Brunswick, is a former Canadian civil servant, appointed by Brian Mulroney's Progressive Conservative government. He held his position under the Liberal government of Jean Chrétien and was in charge of the federal sponsorship program from 1996 to 1999.

On April 2, 2004, previously confidential testimony from a 2002 inquiry into suspicious Groupaction contracts was made public. In it, Guité admits to having bent the rules in his handling of the advertising contracts but defends his actions as excusable given the circumstances, saying, "We were basically at war trying to save the country... When you're at war, you drop the book and the rules and you don't give your plan to the opposition."

He became head of federal government advertising in the 1980s, and left the public service in 1999.

On June 6, 2006, a jury in Montreal found Guité guilty on all five counts of defrauding the Federal Government. On June 19, he was sentenced to 42 months in jail. He appealed his conviction and sentence and both appeals were dismissed in 2008. Since he was granted bail pending appeal, his 42-month sentence did not begin to run until 2008.

On December 23, 2008 the National Parole Board authorized Guité's conditional release making him eligible for day parole on February 15, 2009 and full parole on September 16, 2009. Under Canadian law, first time non-violent offenders are allowed an accelerated review and a possible early release.
