= Groupaction =

- Industry: Advertising agency
- Founded: 1983; 43 years ago
- Founders: Jean Brault; Joane Archambault

Groupaction Inc. is a Canadian advertising agency at the centre of the 2004 Canadian sponsorship scandal. It was incorporated in 1983 as Groupaction Marketing Inc. and received its first federal advertising contract in 1994 with the Canadian Radio-television and Telecommunications Commission (CRTC).

According to a 2006 news report by Canadian Broadcasting Corporation, following the 1995 referendum on Quebec sovereignty, rumours were heard about a fund being set up by the Canadian Government to support federalism.

By September 2004, John Gomery was heading an inquiry into the Canadian Federal Sponsorship Program.

== See also ==
- Sponsorship scandal
- Gomery Commission
- Alfonso Gagliano
