= List of University of Oxford people in public life overseas =

This is a list of people from the University of Oxford in public life overseas. Many were students at one (or more) of the colleges of the university, and others held fellowships at a college.

This list forms part of a series of lists of people associated with the University of Oxford – for other lists, please see the main article List of University of Oxford people.

== Monarchs ==
Name	College	Years	Reign	Ref
Seretse Khama	Balliol	1945	King of the BagammaNgwato people (1925); afterwards first President of Botswana (1966–1980)	
Jigme Khesar Namgyal Wangchuck	Magdalen	2000-?	King of Bhutan (2006 onwards)	
Abdullah II of Jordan	Pembroke		King of Jordan (1999 onwards)	
Sultan Ahmad Shah	Worcester	1948-?	King of Malaysia (1979–1984) and Sultan of Pahang (1979 onwards)	
Tuanku Abdul Halim	Wadham	-1954	King of Malaysia (1970–1975; 2011–2016) and Sultan of Kedah (1958 onwards)	
Tuanku Jaafar	Balliol		King of Malaysia (1994–1999) and Yang di-Pertuan Besar of Negeri Sembilan (1968 onwards)	
Muhammad V of Kelantan	St Cross	1990–1991	King of Malaysia (2016–2018) and Sultan of Kelantan (2010 onwards)	
Dr Nazrin Shah of Perak	Worcester		Acting King of Malaysia (2018–2019), Deputy King of Malaysia (2016 onwards) and Sultan of Perak (2014 onwards)	
William II of the Netherlands	Christ Church		King of the Netherlands and Grand Duke of Luxembourg (1840–1849)	
Harald V of Norway	Balliol	1960–1962	King of Norway (1991 onwards)	
Olav V of Norway	Balliol	1924–1926	King of Norway (1957–1991)	
Vajiravhud	Christ Church	1900–1901	King of Siam (1910–1925)	
Andrew Bertie	Christ Church		Prince and Grand Master of the Sovereign Military Order of Malta (1988–2008)	
George Tupou V			King of Tonga (2006–2012)	
Sidkeong Tulku Namgyal	Pembroke		Maharaja and Chogyal of Sikkim (1914)	
Moshoeshoe II of Lesotho	Corpus Christi		King of Lesotho (1966–1990, 1995–1996)	
Naruhito	Merton	1980s	Emperor of Japan (2019 onwards)	
Philippe of Belgium	Trinity	1978–1981	King of the Belgians (2013 onwards)	

== Royal persons ==
Name	College	Years at Oxford	Country	Ref
Dasho Jigyel Ugyen Wangchuk, Prince of Bhutan	St Peter's		Bhutan	
Al-Muhtadee Billah, Crown Prince of Brunei	Magdalen		Brunei	
Empress Masako	Balliol		Japan	
Prince Akishino of Japan	St John's		Japan	
Prince Chichibu of Japan	Magdalen		Japan	
Prince Tomohito of Mikasa	Magdalen		Japan	
Princess Akiko of Mikasa	Merton		Japan	
El Hassan bin Talal, formerly Crown Prince to the Hashemite Throne of Jordan	Christ Church		Jordan	
Princess Aisha of Jordan	Pembroke		Jordan	
Princess Badiya of Jordan			Jordan	
Princess Haya of Jordan	St Hilda's		Jordan	
Prince Guillaume of Luxembourg			Luxembourg	
Raja Zarith Sofia, Consort of Sultan of Johor	Somerville		Malaysia	
Sheikha Alanoud bint Hamad Al Thani			Qatar	
Grand Duke George Mikhailovich of Russia	St Benet's Hall		Russia	
Prince Khalid al Faisal of Saudi Arabia			Saudi Arabia	
Natan Gamedze, Prince of Swaziland			Swaziland	
Mom Rajawongse Seni Pramoj of Thailand	Worcester		Thailand	
Prince Wan Waithayakon of Thailand			Thailand	
Prince Kitiyakara Voralaksana of Thailand	Balliol		Thailand	
Prince Paul of Yugoslavia	Christ Church	-1921 (studies interrupted by World War I)	Yugoslavia	
Princess Catherine Hilda Duleep Singh	Somerville		Sikh Empire	
Princess Bamba Sutherland	Somerville		Sikh Empire	
Ahmed Shah Khan, Crown Prince of Afghanistan			Afghanistan	
Maria Vladimirovna, Grand Duchess of Russia			Russia	
Prince Abbas Hilmi			Egypt	
Princess Badiya bint Hassan			Jordan	
Prince Moulay Hicham of Morocco		−2020	Morocco	
Princess Elisabeth, Duchess of Brabant	Lincoln	2021-2024	Belgium	

== Heads of State and Heads of Government ==
Name	College	Years at Oxford	Country	Position	Ref
John Gorton	Brasenose	1932–1935	Australia	Prime Minister 1968–71	
Malcolm Fraser	Magdalen	1949–1952	Australia	Prime Minister 1975–83	
Bob Hawke	University	1953–1955/6	Australia	Prime Minister 1983–91	
Tony Abbott	The Queen's	1981–1983	Australia	Prime Minister 2013–15	
Malcolm Turnbull	Brasenose	1978–1980	Australia	Prime Minister 2015–2018	
Kevin Rudd	Jesus College, Oxford	2017–	Australia	Prime Minister 2007–2010; 2013	
Grantley Adams	St Catherine's Society	1919–	Barbados and the West Indies	Premier of Barbados 1954–58; Prime Minister of the West Indies Federation 1958–62	
J.M.G. (Tom) Adams	Magdalen		Barbados	Prime Minister of Barbados 1976–85	
Seretse Khama	Balliol		Botswana	President 1966–80	
Festus Mogae	University		Botswana	President 1998–2008	
John Turner	Magdalen		Canada	Prime Minister 1984	
Lester Bowles Pearson	St John's		Canada	Prime Minister 1963–68	
Mark Carney	St Peter's and Nuffield	1991–1995	Canada	Prime Minister 2025–	
Solomon Bandaranaike	Christ Church		Ceylon	Prime Minister 1956–59	
Alvaro Uribe	St. Anthony's		Colombia	President of Colombia, 2002–2010	
José Ramos-Horta	St Antony's		East Timor	Nobel Peace Prize laureate 1996; Prime Minister 2006–2007; President 2007–2012; 2022-	
Penaia Ganilau	Wadham		Fiji	President 1987–93	
Kamisese Mara	Wadham		Fiji	Prime Minister 1967–87 and 1987–92; President 1993–2000	
Richard von Weizsäcker	Balliol		Germany	President 1984–94	
John Kufuor	Exeter		Ghana	President 2001–09	
Edward Afuko Addo	St Peter's		Ghana	President 1970–72	
Kofi Abrefa Busia	University and St Antony's		Ghana	Prime Minister 1969–72	
John Francis Davis			Hong Kong	Governor 1844–1848	
George Bowen	Trinity	−1844	Hong Kong	Governor 1883–1885	
William Des Vœux	Balliol	−1856	Hong Kong	Governor 1887–1891	
Reginald Edward Stubbs	Corpus Christi	−1899	Hong Kong	Governor 1919–1925	
Cecil Clementi	Magdalen	−1898	Hong Kong	Governor 1925–1930	
Andrew Caldecott	Exeter	−1907	Hong Kong	Governor 1935–1937	
Geoffry Northcote	Balliol		Hong Kong	Governor 1937–41	
Lord Murray MacLehose	Balliol		Hong Kong	Governor 1971–82	
Lord David Wilson	Keble	1955–1958	Hong Kong	Governor 1987–92	
Lord Chris Patten	Balliol		Hong Kong	Governor 1992–1997	
Viktor Orbán	Pembroke	1989–1990	Hungary	Prime Minister 1998–2002; 2010–now	
Guðni Th. Jóhannesson	St Antony's	1999–2000	Iceland	President 2016–	
Sarvepalli Radhakrishnan	Manchester and All Souls	1923–27 (Lecturer, Manchester); 1936–52 (Professor, All Souls)	India	First Indian to hold an Oxford professorship. President 1962–67	
Manmohan Singh	Nuffield		India	Prime Minister 2004–2014	
Indira Gandhi	Somerville	1937–1941	India	Prime Minister 1966–77 and 1980–84	
Norman Manley	Jesus		Jamaica	Chief Minister 1955–59, Premier 1959–62	
Dominic Mintoff	Hertford		Malta	Prime Minister 1955–58, 1971–84	
Sir Maung Gyee			Myanmar/Burma		
Aung San Suu Kyi	St Hugh's	1964–1967	Myanmar	State Counsellor of Myanmar (De facto Prime Minister) 2015-now Nobel Peace Prize laureate	
Zulfiqar Ali Bhutto	Christ Church		Pakistan	President 1971–73, Prime Minister 1973–77	
Benazir Bhutto	Lady Margaret Hall		Pakistan	Prime Minister 1988–90, 1993–96	
Wasim Sajjad	Wadham		Pakistan	President 1993, 1997–98	
Liaquat Ali Khan	Exeter	1918–1921	Pakistan	Prime Minister 1947–51	
Huseyn Shaheed Suhrawardy			Pakistan	Prime Minister 1956–57	
Farooq Leghari			Pakistan	President 1993–97	
Imran Khan	Keble College, Oxford	1972–1975	Pakistan	Prime Minister 2018–2022	
Pedro Pablo Kuczynski	Exeter	1956–	Peru	Prime Minister of Peru 2005–06; President of Peru 2016–2018	
Seni Pramoj	Worcester		Thailand	Prime Minister 1945–46, 1975, 1976	
Ferdinand "Bongbong" Romualdez Marcos Jr.	St Edmund Hall	1975-1978	Philippines	17th President of the Philippines 2022- Senator 2010–2016; Representative 1992–95, 2007–10; Governor 1983–86, 1998–2007; Vice Governor 1981–83; Lieutenant, Phil. Constabulary	.
Mark Brantley	St. Catherine's, Oxford		St. Kitts and Nevis	Premier of Nevis	
Kukrit Pramoj	The Queen's	−1933	Thailand	Prime Minister 1975–76	
Abhisit Vejjajiva	St John's		Thailand	Prime Minister 2008–2011	
Enele Sopoaga		1956–	Tuvalu	Prime Minister 2013–2019	
Eric Williams	St Catherine's		Trinidad and Tobago	Prime Minister 1956–81	
A. N. R. Robinson	St John's		Trinidad and Tobago	Prime Minister 1986–91, President 1997–2003	
Mihai Razvan Ungureanu	St Cross		Romania	Prime Minister 2012	
Bill Clinton	University	1968–1970	United States	President 1993–2001	
Chukwuemeka Odumegwu Ojukwu	Lincoln		Biafra	President 1967–1970	
Risto Ryti		1914	Finland	President 1940–1944 & Prime Minister 1939–1940	

== Politicians, civil servants, diplomats, and military personnel ==
Name	College	Years at Oxford	Country	Notes	Ref
Kim Beazley			Australia	Leader HM Opposition 1996–2001, 2005–2006	
Rubén Berríos			Puerto Rico	Honorary President, Socialist International 1999– President, Puerto Rican Independence Party 1968–	
George Brandis	Magdalen		Australia	Senator for Qld 2000– Senior Counsel 2006– Minister for Arts & Sport 2007–	
Ashton Carter		1976–79 (Ph.D. in Theoretical Physics)	United States	Physicist, Harvard University professor, United States Secretary of Defense	
Jim Cooper	Oriel College, Oxford		United States	Congressman of the United States Congress	
Zelman Cowen	New College and Oriel		Australia	Governor General 1977–82, Provost of Oriel 1982–90	
Gareth Evans	Magdalen		Australia	Foreign Minister 1988–96; Deputy Leader Australian Labor Party 1996–98	
Geoff Gallop	St John's		Australia	Premier of Western Australia 2001–06	
James Gobbo	Magdalen		Australia	Judge Supreme Court of Victoria 1978–94; Lt–Governor Victoria 1995–97; Governor 1997–2000	
Geoffrey Keighley	Trinity		Australia	First–class cricketer, barrister Member of NSW Legislative Council	
Tomáš Hellebrandt			Slovakia	Member of the National Council of Slovakia (2023-)	
Wilfrid Kent Hughes	Christ Church		Australia	Member of the House of Representatives 1949–70; Minister 1951–56	
Peter King			Australia	Member of the House of Representatives 2001–04	
Andrew Murray			Australia	Member of the Australian Senate 1996–2007	
Fred Paterson			Australia	Member of the House of Representatives 1944–50	
Malcolm Turnbull			Australia	Opposition Leader of Australia 2008–	
Daryl Williams			Australia	Attorney General of Australia 1996–2003	
Ian Wilson			Australia	Member of the House of Representatives 1966–69 and 1972–93; Minister 1981–83	
Frank Vandenbroucke		1996–1999; DPhil	Belgium	Federal MP 1985–96; President Socialist Party 1989–94; Deputy Prime Minister and Foreign Minister 1994–95; Minister 1999–04; Flemish Minister 2004–09; Flemish MP 2009–10; Minister of State 2009– Senator 2010–	
Maidin Hashim		1984 (Certificate in Diplomacy)	Brunei	Ambassador of Brunei to Germany 1994–97; Permanent Representative of Brunei to the United Nations 1997–98; High Commissioner of Brunei to the United Kingdom 2006–10	
James Coyne			Canada	Governor of the Bank of Canada 1955–61	
Jack Davis	St John's	Elected Rhodes Scholar in 1939, studies interrupted by war	Canada	MP 1962–74, MLA British Columbia 1975–78 and 1979–1991	
Eugene Forsey	Balliol		Canada	Senate 1970–79, Privy Council 1985–91	
Onésime Gagnon			Canada	House of Commons 1930–40; National Assembly of Quebec 1936–60; Lieutenant–Governor of Quebec 1958–61	
Paul Gérin-Lajoie			Canada	National Assembly of Quebec 1960–70; Minister 1960–66; Pres Canadian International Development Agency 1970–77	
Alastair Gillespie			Canada	Sometime Government minister	
John Godfrey	Balliol, St Antony's	1967 MPhil, 1975 DPhil	Canada	Pres & V-C Univ of K Coll 1977–87; Editor Financial Post 1987–91, MP 1993–2008; Parliamentary Sec to the PM 1996–2004; Min of State 2004–06; Head Master Toronto French School 2008–	
Allan Gotlieb	Wadham and All Souls		Canada	Ambassador to the USA 1981–89, Chairman Canada Council 1989–94	
Arnold Heeney	St John's		Canada	Clerk of the Privy Council & Cabinet Secretary 1940–49 Ambassador USA 1953–57 & 1959–62	
George Ignatieff			Canada	Ambassador to Yugoslavia 1956–8, NATO 1963–6, UN 1966–9, Chancellor University of Toronto 1980–6	
Michael Ignatieff			Canada	House of Commons 2006–	
Ted Jolliffe	Christ Church		Canada	Leader Ontario CCF 1942–53, Leader Opposition Ontario Legislature 1943–45 & 1948–51	
Arthur Kroeger	Pembroke		Canada	Deputy Minister 1975–92, Chancellor of Carleton University 1993–2002	
Marcel Lambert	Hertford		Canada	MP 1957–84, Speaker 1962–63, Minister of Veterans Affairs 1963	
Otto Lang	Exeter		Canada	MP 1968–79, Minister 1968–79, Attorney General 1972–75 & 1978	
David Lewis			Canada	leader of New Democratic Party of Canada 1971–75	
Charles Herbert Little	Brasenose		Canada	Director of Naval Intelligence World War II	
Vincent Massey	Balliol		Canada	Ambassador to USA 1927–30, Governor General 1952–59	
Roland Michener	Hertford		Canada	Speaker 1957–62, High Commissioner India & Ambassador Nepal 1964–67, Governor General 1967–74	
Talbot Mercer Papineau	Brasenose		Canada	MC 1915, died Passchendaele 6am 30 October 1917	
Jack Pickersgill			Canada	Clerk of the Privy Council & Sec to the Cabinet 1952–53, MP 1953–67, Privy Counsellor from 1953, CC from 1970, styled The Rt Hon from 1992	
Bob Rae	Balliol		Canada	Premier of Ontario 1990–95	
Escott Reid	Christ Church		Canada	High Commr & Ambassador 1952–62, Dir S Asia & Middle East Dept World Bank 1962–5	
Edgar Ritchie			Canada	Ambassador to USA 1966–70, Ambassador to Ireland 1976–80	
Norman Robertson			Canada	High Commr UK 1946–9 & 1952–7, Clerk of the Privy Council & Cabinet Sec 1949–52, Ambassador USA 1957–8	
Norman McLeod Rogers	University		Canada	MP 1935–40, Minister of Labour 1935–9, Minister of National Defence 1939–40	
James Sinclair			Canada	MP 1940–58, Minister of Fisheries 1952–57	
Arnold Smith	Christ Church		Canada	Ambassador to Egypt 1958–61, to USSR 1961–63, Commonwealth Secretary General 1965–75	
George F.G. Stanley	Keble	1929–1936	Canada	Lieutenant–Governor of New Brunswick 1981–87, designer of the Canadian flag	
Michel Vennat	Merton		Canada	Special Asst to the PM 1968–70, QC 1983, President Business Development Bank of Canada 2000–04	
Danny Williams		1969 elected Rhodes Scholar	Canada	QC 1984, Premier of Newfoundland and Labrador 2003–	
Lalith Athulathmudali	Jesus		Ceylon/Sri Lanka	Minister of National Security, Minister of State for Defence, Minister of Agriculture and Minister of Education.	
Lakshman Kadirgamar	Balliol		Ceylon/Sri Lanka	Foreign Minister 1994–2001 and 2004–05	
William de Silva	University		Ceylon/Sri Lanka	Minister of Industries and Fisheries	
Tyronne Fernando	Keble		Ceylon/Sri Lanka	Foreign Minister 2001–04	
Gamani Corea	Nuffield		Ceylon/Sri Lanka	Secretary-General of the UNCTD & Ambassador to the EEC, Belgium, Luxembourg and the Netherlands	
Rajiva Wijesinha	University & Corpus Christi		Ceylon/Sri Lanka	Lecturer; Sri Lankan Liberal Party MP, 2010–15	
Lala Sukuna			Fiji	Tui Lau 1938–58, Speaker Legislative Council 1954–58, served French Foreign Legion (Croix de Guerre)	
Ralf Dahrendorf, Baron Dahrendorf	St Antony's		Germany	Member Bundestag & Sec of State 1969–70, Eur Commr 1970, Dir LSE 1974–84	
Hans Bernd von Haeften			Germany	conspired in 20 July plot to assassinate Hitler, hanged at Plötzensee 15 August 1944	
Adam von Trott zu Solz	Balliol		Germany	conspired in 20 July plot to assassinate Hitler, hanged at Plötzensee 26 August 1944	
Stephen Lam		2012–2013	Hong Kong	Acting Chief Executive of Hong Kong, Chief Secretary for Administration, Secretary for Constitutional and Mainland Affairs	
Ronny Tong	St Edmund Hall, Oxford		Hong Kong	Member of the Executive Council of Hong Kong, member of the Legislative Council of Hong Kong, founder of Civic Party, founder and convenor of Path of Democracy, Queen's Counsel, Senior counsel	
Braj Kumar Nehru	Balliol		India		
Binay Ranjan Sen			India	director general of UN Food and Agriculture Organization 1956–67	
John Michuki	Oxford		Kenya	MP 1983–, Min for Transport & Commns 2002–05, for Internal Security 2005–	
Khairy Jamaluddin	St Hugh's		Malaysia	Member of Parliament for Rembau 2008–2022, Minister of Youth and Sports 2013–2018, Minister of Science, Technology & Innovation 2020–2021, Minister of Health 2021–2022	
Sivarasa Rasiah	St Anne's		Malaysia	Member of Parliament for Subang 2008–2018, Sungai Buloh 2018–2022, Deputy Minister of Rural Development 2018–2020	
Tony Pua	Keble		Malaysia	Member of Parliament for Damansara 2008–2022	
Aurelio Nuño Mayer	St Antony's College, Oxford		Mexico	Secretary of Public Education (2015–17) Chief of Staff of the President (2012–15)	
Héctor Vasconcelos			Mexico	Senator (2018–), Ambassador to Denmark, Norway, and Iceland, initial Foreign Secretary nominee	
Chris Laidlaw	Merton		New Zealand	High Commissioner to Harare 1986–89, MP 1992–93	
Arthur Porritt, Baron Porritt	Magdalen		New Zealand	Olympic bronze medal 1924, NZ Olympic captain 1928, member IOC 1934–67, surgeon to the King 1946–52, to the Queen 1952–67, President BMA and RCS, Governor General NZ 1967–72	
Paul Reeves	St Peter's		New Zealand	Archbishop 1980–85, Governor General 1985–90	
Bilawal Bhutto Zardari	Christ Church	2007–10	Pakistan	Appointed Chairman Pakistan Peoples Party 30 December 2007 and will become full-time party leader on completing his course at Oxford	
Imran Khan	Keble		Pakistan	cricket captain 1982–92, leader of Tehreek–e–Insaf Party Pakistan Tehreek-e-Insaf1997–, MP 2002–	
Khurshid Mahmud Kasuri			Pakistan	Foreign Minister	
Murtaza Bhutto	Christ Church	1977–1979 (Master of Letters)	Pakistan	Former chairman of Pakistan Peoples Party (Shaheed Bhutto)	
Khalid Jawed Khan	Hertford		Pakistan	33rd and 35th Attorney General for Pakistan 2018, 2020-2022	
Radosław Sikorski	Pembroke		Poland	Minister of National Defence 2005–07, Minister of Foreign Affairs 2007–	
Mark Brantley	St. Catherine's		St. Kitts and Nevis	Minister of Foreign Affairs	
Desmond Lee			Singapore	Minister for Social and Family Development & Second Minister for National Development	
Raymond Lim			Singapore	Minister for Transport 2006–2011	
Sim Ann	Exeter		Singapore	Senior Minister of State, Ministry of Communications and Information & Ministry of Culture, Community and Youth	
Frene Ginwala			South Africa	Speaker of the National Assembly 1994–2004	
Jan Hofmeyr			South Africa	Cabinet Minister	
Pixley ka Isaka Seme	Jesus		South Africa	founder of South African Native National Congress (later the ANC)	
Korn Chatikavanij	St. John's		Thailand	Finance Minister of Thailand 2009–2011	
Sukhumbhand Paribatra	Pembroke		Thailand	Deputy Foreign Minister of Thailand 1997–2000, Governor of Bangkok 2009–2016	
Carl Albert	St Peter's		United States	US Representative (Oklahoma) 1947–77, Speaker of the US House of Representatives 1971–77	
Thomas H. Allen	Wadham		United States	US Representative (Maine) 1997	
Gabe Amo	Merton	2010; Marshall Scholar	United States	US Representative (Rhode Island) 2023–	
Rick Baker			United States	Mayor of St Petersburg, Florida 2001–05 & 2005–10	
Tom Birmingham	Exeter		United States	President of Massachusetts State Senate 1996–2003	
Dennis C. Blair			United States	Commander–in–Chief of US Pacific Command 1999–2002	
Charles Bonesteel			United States	Commander US Forces and Commander–in–Chief UN Command Korea 1966–69	
Cory Booker			United States	Mayor of Newark 2006–13, US Senator (New Jersey) 2013–	
David Boren	Balliol		United States	Governor of Oklahoma 1975–79, US Senator (Oklahoma) 1979–94, President University of Oklahoma 1994–2018	
John Brademas	Brasenose		United States	US Representative (Indiana) 1959–81	
Bill Bradley	Worcester		United States	US Senator (New Jersey) 1979–97	
Ben Cannon	Corpus Christi		United States	Democratic candidate Oregon State Representative for House District 46	
Brad Carson	Trinity		United States	US Representative (Oklahoma) 2001–05	
Dick Celeste	Exeter		United States	Dir Peace Corps 1979–81, Gov Ohio 1983–91, Ambassador to India 1997–2001 Pres Colorado College 2002–	
Wesley Clark	Magdalen		United States	Nato Supreme Allied Commander Europe 1997–2000	
Charles R. Clason	Christ Church		United States	US Representative (Massachusetts) 1937–1949	
Richard Danzig			United States	US Secretary of the Navy 1998–2001	
Nancy-Ann Min DeParle	Balliol		United States	director Health Care Financing Administration (HCFA) 1997–2000	
Liddy Dole	University		United States	Secretary of Transportation 1983–87 of Labor 89–90, President US Red Cross 91–99, US Senator (N Carolina) 2003–	
William Henry Drayton	Balliol		United States	member of Continental Congress	
Russ Feingold	Magdalen		United States	US Senator (Wisconsin) 1993–2011	
David B. Frohnmayer	Wadham		United States	Attorney General of Oregon 1981–91, President University of Oregon 1994–2009	
William Fulbright	Pembroke		United States	US Senator (Arkansas) 1945–74	
Robert J. Harris			United States	Mayor of Ann Arbor 1969–73	
Gary Hart	St Antony's		United States	US Senator (Colorado) 1975–87	
Bradley C. Hosmer			United States	Superintendent US Air Force Academy 1991–94	
Bobby Jindal	New College		United States	Asst Secretary of Health and Human Services 2001–04, US Representative (Louisiana) 2005–2008, Governor of Louisiana 2008–2016	
Philip Mayer Kaiser	Balliol		United States	Assistant Secretary of Labor 1949–53, Ambassador Mauritania 1961–64, Hungary 1977–80, Austria 1980–81	
Nicholas Katzenbach	Balliol		United States	Attorney General 1965–66, Under–Secretary of State 1966–69	
John Neely Kennedy	Magdalen		United States	US Senator (Louisiana) 2017–	
Philip Lader	Pembroke		United States	Ambassador to the United Kingdom 1997–2001	
Robb LaKritz	Worcester		United States	Advisor to the United States Deputy Secretary of Treasury 2001–2003	
Arthur Larson	Pembroke		United States	US Under Sec of Labor 1954–6, Dir US Information Agency 1956–7, Exec Asst to the President 1957–8	
Richard Lugar	Pembroke		United States	US Senator (Indiana) 1977–2013	
Ira Magaziner			United States	President Clinton's chief internet policy advisor	
Robert McCallum, Jr.	Christ Church		United States	Asst AG 01–03, Assoc AG 03–05, Acting Dep AG 04 & 05, Ambassador to Australia 05–	
Charles Thomas McMillen	University		United States	Olympic silver medallist 1972, US Representative (Maryland) 1987–93	
Thomas Merrill			United States	Deputy Solicitor General 1987–90, Professor of Law Northwestern University 1993–2003, Columbia Law School 2003–	
William Green Miller			United States	United States Ambassador to Ukraine from 1993 to 1998	
Wes Moore	Wolfson		United States	Governor of Maryland 2023–present	
James Oglethorpe	Corpus Christi		United States	founder of Georgia	
William Penn	Christ Church		United States	founder of Pennsylvania	
Kim E. Petersen	University of Oxford		United States	security and counter-terrorism expert	
Larry Pressler	St Edmund Hall		United States	US Senator (South Dakota) 1979–97	
Franklin Raines	Magdalen		United States	Director US Office of Management and Budget 1996–98	
Robert Reich	University		United States	Secretary of Labor 1993–97	
Mel Reynolds	Lincoln		United States	US Representative (Illinois) 1993–95	
Susan E. Rice	New College		United States	Assistant Secretary of State (African affairs) 1997–2001, United States Ambassador to the United Nations 2009–2013	
Winthrop Paul Rockefeller	Pembroke		United States	Lieutenant Governor of Arkansas 1996–2006	
Bernard W. Rogers	University		United States	Nato Supreme Allied Commander Europe and Commander–in–Chief US European Command 1979–87	
Dean Rusk	St John's		United States	Secretary of State from 1961 to 1969	
Edward Rutledge			United States	member of Continental Congress	
Paul Sarbanes	Balliol		United States	US Senator (Maryland) 1977–2007	
Kurt Schmoke	Balliol		United States	State's Attorney Baltimore City 1982–87, Mayor of Baltimore 1987–99	
Terri Sewell	St. Hilda's		United States	US Representative (Alabama) 2011–	
John M. Spratt, Jr.			United States	US Representative (South Carolina) 1983–2011	
Cecil Staton	Regent's Park		United States	Georgia State Senator	
George Stephanopoulos	Balliol		United States	White House Communications Director under President Clinton	
William Stevenson			United States	Olympic gold medallist 1924, President Oberlin College 1946–61, Ambassador Philippines 1961–65	
William Stoughton	New College		United States	acting Governor of Massachusetts 1694–99	
Strobe Talbott	Magdalen		United States	Deputy Secretary of State 1994–2001	
Stansfield Turner	Exeter		United States	Director of Central Intelligence 1977–81	
David Vitter	Magdalen		United States	US Senator (Louisiana) 2005–	
William Weld	University		United States	Governor of Massachusetts 1991–97	
Heather Wilson	Jesus		United States	Secretary of the Air Force 2017–2019 and US Representative (New Mexico) 1998–2009	
R. James Woolsey	St John's		United States	director of Central Intelligence 1993–95	
Arthur Mutambara	Merton		Zimbabwe	president Movement for Democratic Change faction 2006–	
Edward Yau	Balliol		Hong Kong	Secretary for the Environment	
Andriy Zagorodnyuk			Ukraine	Minister of Defence of Ukraine	
Sigrid Kaag	St Antony's	1987–1988	Netherlands	Deputy Prime Minister of the Netherlands 2022–	

- Alan Bersin (born 1946), President Obama's "Border Czar," US Attorney for the Southern District of California, California Secretary of Education, Commissioner of US Customs and Border Protection, US Department of Homeland Security Secretary for International Affairs, and INTERPOL vice president
- Urszula Gacek (born 1963), British-born Polish member of the European Parliament and former Consul General of the Republic of Poland in New York City
- Jakov Milatović (born 1986), Current President of Montenegro, previous Ministry of Economy (Montenegro)

== Non-government people in public life ==
Name	College	Years at Oxford	Notes	Ref
Prince Alexander of Pless	Mathematical Institute	1925–1929	MI6 officer, German and Polish businessman	
Chelsea Clinton	University	2001–2003	DPhil International Relations. Daughter of Bill Clinton and Hillary Clinton (former First Daughter of the United States of America)	
J. Paul Getty	Magdalen	−1914	Philanthropist	
Guy Spier	University	1984–1988	Investor and Author. 1983: Matriculation in Law. 1988: BA, Politics, Philosophy and Economics.	
Malala Yousafzai	Lady Margaret Hall, Oxford	2017–2020	Nobel Peace Prize laureate	
Marc Kielburger			co–founder of the Kiel Network	
Prince Felix Yusupov	University College	1909–12	Founder of Oxford University Russian Society	
Ronny Tong SC	St Edmund Hall		Founder of Civic Party, former Queen's Counsel, former chairman of Hong Kong Bar Association, former legislator of Hong Kong	
Dr The Hon Kenneth Chan Ka-lok	Nuffield College		Legislator, former Civic Party chairman, associate professor	
Hikaru Wakeel Hayakawa	Exeter College		Climate justice activist, UNESCO and WHO youth advisor, and Climate Cardinals Executive Director	

== Colonial administrators ==
=== Governor-Generals/Viceroys of India ===
Name	College	Years at Oxford	Years as Viceroy/Governor General	Notes	Ref
Lord Curzon	Balliol and All Souls		1899–1905	Tenure known particularly for the Indian famine of 1899–1900	

== See also ==
- List of former Rhodes Scholars
- List of vice-chancellors of the University of Oxford
- List of heads of houses of the University of Oxford
