= Minister of Ports and Highways =

Minister of Ports and Highways may refer to

- Minister of Highways, Ports & Shipping, Sri Lanka
- Minister of Highways, Ports and Properties (Isle of Man)

See also

- Department of Highways and Minor Ports (Tamil Nadu), India
