= StrategyCorp =

Canadian public affairs and consulting firm

StrategyCorp Inc.
- Type: Private
- Industry: Public affairs; Lobbying; Public Relations; Management consulting
- Founded: 1995; 31 years ago
- Founders: Leslie Noble, John Duffy
- Headquarters: Toronto, Ontario, Canada
- Area served: Canada
- Website: strategycorp.com

StrategyCorp Inc. is a Canadian public affairs, communications and management consulting firm based in Toronto, with an office in Ottawa. It was founded in 1995 by Leslie Noble, a Ontario Progressive Conservative strategist who managed Mike Harris's 1995 election campaign, and John Duffy, a federal Liberal adviser and author. The firm's cross-partisan structure, with senior practitioners drawn from rival parties, has been a recurring subject of press commentary throughout its history.

StrategyCorp has represented clients before the federal, Ontario provincial and municipal governments, and also conducts governance and service-delivery reviews for Ontario municipalities.

== History ==
=== Founding and early years ===
Noble, who co-wrote the Common Sense Revolution platform and served as Progressive Conservative campaign manager in the 1995 Ontario general election, established StrategyCorp Inc. in November 1995 in partnership with Duffy, a Liberal strategist. According to a 1999 Toronto Star investigation, the two divided their work by jurisdiction, with Noble concentrating on the Ontario government and Duffy on the federal Liberals, and the firm initially operated from offices in the Toronto Dominion Bank Tower. Early clients included Greyhound, Ontario Hydro, the Brewers of Ontario, the Ontario Forest Industries Association and the Ontario Provincial Police Association.

In 1998, Sabine Matheson (then John Matheson), an executive assistant to Ontario Municipal Affairs Minister Al Leach, joined the firm.

=== Media scrutiny ===
On 13 March 1999 the Toronto Star published a lengthy investigation by Kevin Donovan and Moira Welsh examining Noble's dual role as Harris's campaign manager and adviser and as the head of the leading lobbying firm dealing with his government. The article set out the firm's founding, client roster and business model, and reported Noble's position that she provided only political advice to Harris in his capacity as party leader.

In February 2004, The Globe and Mail reported, on the basis of records obtained under freedom-of-information legislation, that Hydro One had awarded $5.6 million in contracts to four Ontario Progressive Conservatives or their firms; StrategyCorp performed work totalling $250,980.

=== MacNaughton chairmanship and expansion ===
The firm recruited Liberals as the political landscape shifted, hiring Dalton McGuinty's former communications director Jim Maclean in 2001 and, in June 2005, appointing David MacNaughton, McGuinty's former principal secretary, as chairman and shareholder.

Katie Telford, later chief of staff to Prime Minister Justin Trudeau, worked at the firm between her roles with Stéphane Dion and Trudeau. MacNaughton left StrategyCorp, where he was chairman and chief executive, when he was appointed Canadian ambassador to the United States in January 2016.

=== Institute of Public Policy and Economy ===
In July 2019 the firm announced the creation of the StrategyCorp Institute of Public Policy and Economy, a research arm led by Mitchell Davidson, formerly executive director of policy to Premier Doug Ford. The Institute publishes research on Canadian public policy and economic issues and its analysts have been cited in national media.

== Appointment of MacNaughton as ambassador ==
On 16 January 2016, Foreign Affairs Minister Stéphane Dion announced that David MacNaughton, then StrategyCorp's chairman and chief executive, had been appointed Canadian ambassador to the United States, succeeding Gary Doer. MacNaughton had co-chaired the Liberal campaign in Ontario during the 2015 Canadian federal election, and his appointment was announced alongside that of Marc-André Blanchard as ambassador to the United Nations. He left the firm to take up the post in Washington, where the Canada–United States relationship and the renegotiation of the North American Free Trade Agreement dominated his tenure.

The appointment attracted commentary on the movement of political staff between government, consulting and diplomatic posts. Writing in the Toronto Star, Martin Regg Cohn noted that MacNaughton had served as principal secretary to Premier Dalton McGuinty before building his consulting career at StrategyCorp, and that the appointment was overseen by former colleagues then working in the Prime Minister's Office, including Gerald Butts and Katie Telford, the latter a former StrategyCorp consultant. In 2017, responding to criticism of another diplomatic appointment, Butts cited MacNaughton among private-sector figures the government had recruited to diplomatic posts.

== Work at Toronto city hall and Queen's Park ==
In 2013, StrategyCorp was retained by the construction company EllisDon to seek a legislative exemption from a labour-relations obligation arising from a 1958 agreement. Toronto Star columnist Martin Regg Cohn wrote that the firm assigned Duffy and Noble to the file and helped secure cross-party support for a private member's bill introduced by Progressive Conservative MPP Monte McNaughton

The firm was active at Toronto city hall during John Tory's mayoralty. In 2015 the Toronto Star reported that Duffy, who had been an architect of Tory's SmartTrack transit proposal, was organising a non-profit advocacy campaign to build support for the plan, and that StrategyCorp consultants were registered to lobby the city on behalf of Uber and the developer First Gulf. In 2016 the firm lobbied against a proposed landlord licensing regime on behalf of apartment owners. In 2017 The Globe and Mail reported that StrategyCorp lobbied the Ontario and federal governments for Building TO Inc., a group of Toronto-area developers formed in response to the province's housing policy.

In February 2019, The Globe and Mail reported that lobbyists at several Ontario firms, including StrategyCorp, had been asked to sell tickets to a Progressive Conservative Party of Ontario fundraiser headlined by Premier Doug Ford; lobbyists at the firm characterised their involvement as comparable to assistance with past party fundraisers.

=== Municipal and public-sector consulting ===
Alongside its lobbying practice, StrategyCorp conducts governance and service-delivery reviews for Ontario municipalities. A 2016 report by the firm, based on interviews with 25 municipal chief administrative officers, was covered by the Toronto Star. The 10th edition of this survey described a 2026 provincial government that's "filled with ambition but falls short on implementation."

In 2023, StrategyCorp worked with Ernst & Young on the City of Toronto's long-term financial plan, which projected combined operating and capital pressures of $46.5 billion over ten years and set out potential new revenue tools; the report shaped the city's subsequent negotiations with the province.

In 2024 the firm was retained by Northumberland County at a cost of $75,000 to review policing service-delivery models. Its report projected substantial long-term savings from consolidating the county's three police services, but was publicly criticised by Cobourg police chief Paul VandeGraaf, whose service had declined to participate; the Cobourg Police Services Board passed motions objecting to the report's assumptions, and county council received the study for information without proceeding to a costing phase.

Also in 2024, StrategyCorp conducted a council composition and ward boundary review for the Municipality of Chatham-Kent, recommending a reduction in council size. Council adopted a 15-member model and passed the enabling by-law in March 2025, the first change to the municipality's council structure and ward boundaries since amalgamation in 1998; the changes took effect for the 2026 municipal election. The firm has carried out similar reviews and strategic plans for other Ontario municipalities, including Bruce County and Essex County.

=== Alcohol retailing in Ontario ===
From 2012, StrategyCorp handled media relations for the Ontario Convenience Stores Association (OCSA), which was campaigning for permission for convenience stores to sell beer and wine. StrategyCorp was registered as a consultant lobbyist for the association, and later for 7-Eleven Canada on the subject of liquor control and alcohol, with the stated goal of expanding the number of retail points of sale.

The association's campaign combined commissioned research with media outreach. A mystery shopping study it funded, conducted by Statopex Field Marketing and released in May 2011, reported that convenience stores refused sales to underage shoppers more often than LCBO or The Beer Store outlets; the LCBO and The Beer Store both questioned the findings.

In 2013 the association funded a study by University of Waterloo economist Anindya Sen, which argued that Ontario's beer retailing structure allowed The Beer Store to capture some $700 million in additional annual profit relative to Quebec; it ran on the front page of the National Post. The Beer Store responded with its own research and advertising, and the two sides exchanged competing studies and polls over several years.

In May 2019 the Toronto Star reported, based on documents obtained under freedom-of-information legislation, that the Ford government had been coordinating with the OCSA and other groups on expanded beer and wine sales. The documents included a July 2018 message from John Perenack to Finance Minister Vic Fedeli's director of communications offering the association as a resource on the alcohol retailing file, followed by a meeting in the minister's office the next month. A spokesperson for Fedeli defended the minister's handling of the correspondence.

Ontario permitted beer, wine, cider and ready-to-drink beverages to be sold in convenience stores from 5 September 2024. As part of the policy change, the province agreed to pay The Beer Store up to $225 million to end its existing agreement early.

=== Recent work: Therme Group, Ottawa Senators, Waymo ===
StrategyCorp advises Therme Group on its redevelopment of Ontario Place. A 2024 investigation by The Trillium reported that the firm was retained before the Ford government's 2019 call for development, that John Perenack, Noble and other StrategyCorp lobbyists deregistered provincially during the procurement. The firm's role in the project was also raised by Toronto Star columnist Shawn Micallef in the context of the 2023 Toronto mayoral by-election, in which a StrategyCorp vice-president was among the advisers to a prospective candidate.

In December 2025, the Ottawa Citizen reported that Capital Sports Development Inc., the Ottawa Senators-led entity behind a proposed arena at LeBreton Flats, had retained StrategyCorp to engage the federal and Ontario governments about the project.

In 2026, Waymo hired lobbyists from StrategyCorp to advocate with Toronto city officials and mayoral staff as part of its push to enter the Ontario government's automated vehicle pilot program.

== Notable people ==
=== Current ===
- Philippe Couillard, senior advisor; 31st Premier of Quebec, 2014–2018
- Nathan Cullen, vice-president; NDP MP for Skeena—Bulkley Valley, 2004–2019, and MLA for Stikine, 2020–2024
- Barry Campbell, principal advisor; Liberal MP for St. Paul's, 1993–1997
- Michael Cautillo, senior advisor; first president and CEO of the Windsor–Detroit Bridge Authority
- Charles Bordeleau, senior advisor; chief of the Ottawa Police Service, 2012–2019
- Sheri Meyerhoffer, senior advisor; first Canadian Ombudsperson for Responsible Enterprise
- Garry Keller, vice president; sanctioned by Russia in Russo-Ukrainian war

=== Former ===
- Leslie Noble – co-founder and principal emeritus
- John Duffy (1963–2022), co-founder and principal; Liberal strategist and author of Fights of Our Lives, winner of the Shaughnessy Cohen Prize for Political Writing
- David MacNaughton, chairman, 2005–2016; Canadian Ambassador to the United States, 2016–2019
- Katie Telford – senior consultant, c. 2009–2012; later chief of staff to Prime Minister Justin Trudeau
