= Loring Christie =

Canadian diplomat (1885–1941)

Loring Cheney Christie

Envoy Extraordinary and Minister Plenipotentiary for Canada in the United States of America
- In office 1939–1941
- Preceded by: Herbert Meredith Marler
- Succeeded by: Leighton McCarthy

Personal details
- Born: January 25, 1885 Amherst, Nova Scotia
- Died: April 8, 1941 (aged 56) Manhattan, New York

Loring Cheney Christie (January 21, 1885 – April 8, 1941) was a Canadian diplomat who was the Canadian Envoy Extraordinary and Minister Plenipotentiary to the United States from 1939 until his death in office in 1941.

Born in Amherst, Nova Scotia, the oldest son of James Alexander Christie and Evelyn Read, Christie received a Bachelor of Arts degree from Acadia University in 1905, and a Bachelor of Law degree from Harvard University in 1909. While at Harvard, he was one of the editors of the Harvard Law Review.

In 1913, Christie became a legal adviser to the Department of External Affairs. He was an adviser to Prime Minister Robert Borden's on international problems and was his assistant during World War I. He traveled with Borden to the 1917 and 1918 meetings of the Imperial War Cabinet, the Paris Peace Conference, and the Washington Conference. He resigned from the civil service in 1923 and worked at a London, England financial company from 1923 to 1926.

From 1927 to 1929, he was special assistant to the Chairman of Ontario Hydro. From 1929 to 1935, he was a legal adviser to the Beauharnois Light Heat and Power Company. He rejoined the Department of External Affairs in 1935. From 1939 until his death in 1941, he was the Canadian Envoy Extraordinary and Minister Plenipotentiary to the United States.
