= Henry Kotelawala =

Sri Lankan politician

Sir Don Henry Kotelawala was a Ceylonese politician. He was an elected member of the Legislative Council of Ceylon and State Council of Ceylon from the Uva and Badulla for 28 years.

Henry was the son of D. C. Kotelawala (1886–?) from Bandaragama and Sudu Menike Taldena Wijekoon. His father established himself as a businessman in the transportation sector in the Uva Province and was appointed Muhandiram by the British colonial administration. Henry continued his father's business ventures and in 1921 was elected to the Legislative Council representing the Uva Province. In 1931 the Donoughmore Constitution replaced the Legislative Council with the State Council of Ceylon, to which Henry was subsequently elected. He was appointed a Gate Mudaliyar and a justice of the peace by the Governor of Ceylon for his services including services rendered during the 1915 riots. He received a knighthood in the 1947 Birthday Honours for public services in Ceylon.

His nephew, Jack Kotelawala, was a LSSP Member of State Council and Parliament and later served as Ambassador to Russia. His cousin Sir John Kotelawala, served as the third Prime Minister of Ceylon.

Henry married Evelyn Bulathsinhala and they had three children, Gladwin, who served as a Member of Parliament from Buttala, Christobel, who married Oliver Weerasinghe, a leading architect and city planner. His youngest son Gerald married Lakshmini Kotelawala daughter of the 3rd Prime minister of Sri Lanka, Sir John Kotelawala.

== See also ==
- List of political families in Sri Lanka
