= W. G. M. Albert Silva =

Ceylonese politician

Hon. W. G. M. Albert Silva

Member of the Ceylon Parliament for Buttala
- In office 19 April 1956 – 1960
- Preceded by: Gladwin Kotelawala
- Succeeded by: constituency abolished

Member of the Ceylon Parliament for Monaragala
- In office 1960–1965
- Preceded by: constituency established
- Succeeded by: Raja Welegama

Personal details
- Born: Wijeweera Goonawardene Mahavidanege Albert Silva; 15 January 1918
- Party: Sri Lanka Freedom Party
- Profession: politician

Wijeweera Goonawardene Mahavidanege Albert Silva (15 January 1918 – ?) was a Ceylonese politician.

Silva was educated at the Sinhala Mixed School in Monaragala and in 1949 was appointed as town headman of Muppane.

Prior to the 2nd parliamentary election held in May 1952, Silva gave up his post as headman so that he could contest the seat of Buttala as an independent. He received 1,272 votes (10.75% of the total vote), 7,024 votes behind the incumbent member, Leo Fernando, from the United National Party. He didn't run in the 1955 parliamentary by-election, held on 5 March 1955, following the death of the sitting member, Sir Leo Fernando.

Silva, this time running as the candidate for Sri Lanka Freedom Party, was successful at the 3rd parliamentary election held in April 1956, defeating Gladwin Kotelawala by 3,281, securing 7,416 votes (634% of the total vote).

At the March 1960 elections to the fourth parliament, Silva came forward for the newly-demarcated seat of Monaragala as the Sri Lanka Freedom Party candidate and was returned, receiving 3,738 votes (38% of the total vote). However, as the election left neither of the country's two major parties with a majority, another election was called. At the subsequent 5th parliamentary election held on 20 July 1960, Silva retained his seat, polling 5,475 votes (58% of the total vote).

On 3 December 1964, he crossed the floor with Charles Percival de Silva, the deputy party leader, and twelve other members of the Sri Lanka Freedom Party to vote against the government's bill to nationalise the country's newspapers, resulting in defeat of the government of Sirimavo Bandaranaike by one vote. At the ensuing general parliamentary elections in 1965 Silva ran as the candidate for the National Liberation Front (Jathika Vimukthi Peramuna) but failed to get re-elected, losing to the Sri Lanka Freedom Party's candidate, Raja Welegama, by 7,556 votes, with Silva only polling 701 votes (3.9% of the total vote).

Silva didn't contest the 7th parliamentary election, held on 27 May 1970, but did run for the seat of Monaragala at the 8th parliamentary election, held on 21 July 1977. He finished fifth in a field of six, only polling 297 votes (1.2% of the total vote), 12,019 votes behind the successful United National Party candidate, R. M. Punchi Bandara.
