= P. P. Wickremasuriya =

Sri Lankan politician

Perumabadu Piyasena Wickramasuriya (10 March 1921 - 19??) was a Sri Lankan politician. He was the member of Parliament of Sri Lanka from Devinuwara representing the Sri Lanka Freedom Party.

Wickramasuriya first contested the Devinuwara electorate from the Sri Lanka Freedom Party in the March 1960 general election, but lost to Major C. A. Dharmapala from the United National Party. He was successful in the July 1960 general election in defeating Dharmapala and being elected to parliament from Devinuwara. He crossed over to the opposition with C. P. de Silva in December 1964. He lost is seat in the 1965 general election to William de Silva of the Sri Lanka Freedom Party when he contested from the Sri Lanka Freedom Socialist Party and was defeated by Ronnie de Mel in the 1970 general election, when he contested from the United National Party.
