= Ministry of Highways, Ports & Shipping =

Former Sri Lankan government ministry until 2015 reorganization and renaming

Ministry of Highways, Ports and Shipping

Agency overview
- Formed: 1960
- Preceding agencies: Ministry of Nationalised Services, Shipping & Transport; Ministry of Commerce, Trade, Food & Shipping; Ministry of Irrigation, Power & Highways; Ministry of Shipping, Aviation & Tourism; Ministry of Ports & Shipping Ministry of Trade & Shipping; Ministry of Transport & Highways
- Dissolved: 18 January 2015
- Superseding agency: Ministry of Ports and Shipping, Ministry of Higher Education and Highways, Minister of Highways and Investment Promotion
- Jurisdiction: Democratic Socialist Republic of Sri Lanka
- Minister responsible: Mahinda Rajapaksa (last), Minister of Highways, Ports & Shipping
- Agency executive: R.W.R.Pemasiri
- Website: Official website

The Ministry of Highways, Ports and Shipping was a Sri Lankan government ministry responsible for the governance, implementation, creation and development of Ports including Colombo, Galle and Trincomalee ports, Highways including Southern expressway, Colombo Outer Circular expressway, Katunayake expressway and their transport services. It was reorganized as two separate ministries, the Ministry of Ports and Shipping and Ministry of Higher Education and Highways following the formation of the Sirisena cabinet in January 2015.

== History ==
It was created in 1960, at the Second Dudley Senanayake cabinet as the Ministry of Nationalised Services, Shipping & Transport. It included most of the subjects of the current ministry. Then it was renamed as the Ministry of Commerce, Trade, Food & Shipping at the First Sirimavo Bandaranaike cabinet. The highways section was included in the Ministry of Irrigation, Power & Highways in both, Second Sirimavo Bandaranaike cabinet and Jayewardene cabinet. In the Jayewardene Cabinet, the shipping section was included in the Ministry of Shipping, Aviation & Tourism. In the Premadasa cabinet, the ports and shipping sections were included in the Ministry of Ports & Shipping and the Ministry of Trade & Shipping and the highways section was included in the Ministry of Transport & Highways. In the Kumaratunge cabinet (2000) the ports section was included in the Ministry of Ports Development & Development of the South, the highways section was included in the Ministry of Highways, the shipping section was included in the Ministry of Internal & International Trade Commerce, Muslim Religious Affairs & Shipping Development. The highways section and to some extent the shipping section was included in Ministry of Transport, Highways & Aviation of Ranil Wickramasinghe cabinet. The highways section was included in the Ministry of Highways & Road Development and the ports and shipping sections were included in the Ministry of Ports & Aviation in the First Mahinda Rajapaksha cabinet.

The name "Ministry of Highways, Ports and Shipping" was created in Second Mahinda Rajapaksha cabinet in 2010.

== Officials ==
- Minister of Ports and Highways (Cabinet)— the President of the Democratic Socialist Republic of Sri Lanka, Mahinda Rajapaksha.
- Project Minister of Ports and Highways — Nirmala Kotalawala MP
- Project Minister of Ports and Highways — Rohitha AbeygunawardenaMP
- Permanent Secretary — R.W.R.Pemasiri.

=== Ministers ===
Parties

Sri Lanka Freedom Party United National Party Sri Lanka Muslim Congress

Name	Portrait	Party	Tenure	Head(s) of Government	Ministerial title
Montague Jayawickrama		United National Party	23 March 1960 - 1960 July	Dudley Senanayake	Minister of Nationalised Services, Shipping & Transport
T. B. Ilangaratne		Sri Lanka Freedom Party	23 July 1960 - 1965	Sirimavo Bandaranaike	Minister of Commerce, Trade, Food & Shipping
Maithripala Senanayake		Sri Lanka Freedom Party	31 May 1970 - 1977	Sirimavo Bandaranaike	Minister of Irrigation, Power & Highways
Gamini Dissanayake		United National Party	23 July 1977 - 2 January 1989	Junius Richard Jayewardene	Minister of Irrigation, Power & Highways
Wimala Kannangara		United National Party	23 July 1977 - 2 January 1989	Junius Richard Jayewardene	Minister of Shipping, Aviation & Tourism
Alick Aluvihare		United National Party	14 March 1991 - 1 May 1993	Ranasinghe Premadasa	Minister of Ports & Shipping
Rupasena Karunatilake		United National Party		Ranasinghe Premadasa	Minister of Ports & Shipping
Abdul Razak Munsoor		United National Party	18 February 1989 - May 1993	Ranasinghe Premadasa	Minister of Trade & Shipping
Wijayapala Mendis		United National Party	1989 - 1993	Ranasinghe Premadasa	Minister of Transport & Highways
Ronnie de Mel		Sri Lanka Freedom Party	18 October 2000 - 10 October 2001	Chandrika Kumaratunga	Minister of Ports Development & Development of the South
A. H. M.Fowzie		Sri Lanka Freedom Party	18 October 2000 - 10 October 2001	Chandrika Kumaratunga	Minister of Highways
Rauff Hakeem		Sri Lanka Muslim Congress	18 October 2000 - 10 October 2001	Chandrika Kumaratunga	Minister of Internal & International Trade Commerce, Muslim Religious Affairs & Shipping Development
Gamini Athukorala		United National Party	19 December 2001 - 31 December 2001	Chandrika Kumaratunga	Minister of Transport, Highways & Aviation
		United National Party	1 January 2002 - 7 February 2004	Chandrika Kumaratunga	Minister of Transport, Highways & Aviation
Mahinda Rajapaksa	Mahinda Rajapaksa	Sri Lanka Freedom Party	22 April 2004 - 19 November 2005	Chandrika Kumaratunga	Minister of Highways
Jeyaraj Fernandopulle		Sri Lanka Freedom Party	22 April 2004 - 6 April 2008	Mahinda Rajapaksa	Minister of Highways & Road Development
Mangala Samaraweera		Sri Lanka Freedom Party	22 April 2004 - 9 February 2007	Mahinda Rajapaksa	Minister of Ports & Aviation Services
Mahinda Rajapaksa	Mahinda Rajapaksa	Sri Lanka Freedom Party	23 April 2010 – 9 January 2015	Mahinda Rajapaksa	Minister of Highways, Ports & Shipping
Kabir Hashim		United National Party	12 January 2015 – 22 November 2019	Maithripala Sirisena	Minister of Highways and Investment Promotion

== Duties and Functions ==
- Formulation of policies programmes and projects in regard to the subjects of Ports, Highways and Expressways and all subjects that come under the purview of the ministry.
- Direction of the implementation of such policies, programmes and projects within time lines agreed with the national planning authorities and within budgeted resources, with a view to achieving relevant objectives.
- Provision of all public services that come under the purview of the Ministry in an efficient and people friendly manner.
- Reforming of all systems and procedures to ensure the conduct of business in an efficient manner deploying modern management techniques and technology where applicable while eliminating corruption and waste
- Provision and Maintenance in optimum condition of a high quality network of national highways and other principal road
- Implementation of the Maga Neguma Rural Road Development Programme
- Improvement of clear co-ordination process to cover all road project implementing agencies for an integration development and monitoring collection of road user charges in respect of National Policy
- Formulation of Programmes and Projects based on National Policy in respect of Provincial and Local Authority roads and co-ordination and monitoring of such programs and projects
- Road Development activities connected to Kottawa, Kaduwela and Kadawatha Township Development Project
- Development and Administration of ports and harbours, light houses and beacons, oil installation other than those belong to Admiralty
- Arbitration of disputes between shipping Service providers and users
- Establish rules of competition for shipping Services
- Assist and ensure consultation between shipping service providers and users
- Receiving of Wrecks and Ocean salvages
- Administration of Shipping Development Fund
- Freight and shipping Services
- Coastwise passenger traffic

== Departments ==
Departments, with their heads As of 2014:

- Road Development Authority and its Subsidiaries and Associates, headed by Director General, W.A.S. Weerasinghe
- Road Development Fund
- Sri Lanka Ports Authority and its Subsidiaries and Associates, headed by chairman, Priyath B. Wickrama
- Ceylon Shipping Corporation Ltd and its Subsidiaries and Associates, headed by chairman, Vice Admiral Jayanath Colombage
- Director General's Office of Merchant Shipping, headed by Director General, A W Seneviratne

== See also ==
- Minister of Ports and Highways
- Ministry of Finance and Planning (Sri Lanka)
- Ministries of Sri Lanka
