= William de Silva =

Sri Lankan politician

Member of the Ceylon Parliament for Ambalangoda-Balapitiya
- In office 1947–1960
- Preceded by: seat created
- Succeeded by: seat abolished

Member of the Ceylon Parliament for Ambalangoda
- In office March 1960 – June 1960
- Preceded by: seat created
- Succeeded by: Patrick de Silva Kularatne

Member of the Ceylon Parliament for Devinuwara
- In office 1965–1969
- Preceded by: P. P. Wickremasuriya
- Succeeded by: Ronnie de Mel

Personal details
- Born: Peduru Hewage William de Silva; 8 December 1908
- Died: 30 July 1988 (aged 79)
- Party: Sri Lanka Freedom Party; Lanka Sama Samaja Party
- Education: Ananda College; University College, Colombo; University College, Oxford
- Occupation: Politician

Peduru Hewage William de Silva (8 December 1908 – 30 July 1988) was a 20th-century Marxist Sri Lankan politician.

P. H. William de Silva was born at Kahatapitiya in Batapola, Ambalangoda, Ceylon, to a wealthy land-owning family. He received his elementary education at Batapola Mixed School and secondary education at St John's College, Panadura, Richmond College, Galle, and Ananda College, Colombo. He studied for one year at the University College Colombo (now the University of Colombo) and then travelled to England for further studies at University College, Oxford.

While in England, William de Silva joined the India League and a Marxist study group with other Ceylonese students in London. He then returned to Ceylon and joined the Lanka Sama Samaja Party (LSSP). During World War II, he was an anti-war movement leader and was imprisoned in Bogambara Prison and Badulla Prison in Sri Lanka (1943–1945). He became a Ceylonese Member of Parliament in 1947 and 1953. He was leader of the All-Ceylon Estate Workers Union and Vice-President of the All-Ceylon Congress of Samasamaja Youth Leagues. He separated from the LSSP in October 1953 and joined the Viplavakari Lanka Sama Samaja Party (VLLSP). He and Philip Gunawardena founded the Mahajana Eksath Peramuna. He was Cabinet Minister of Industries and Fisheries in S. W. R. D. Bandaranaike's SLFP-MEP coalition government (1956–1959). He became a member of parliament in 1960 and was Vice-President of the Sri Lanka Freedom Party. In 1970, he became the Ceylon High Commissioner to Canada.

De Silva died aged 79.

== See also ==
- List of Sri Lankan non-career diplomats
- List of Sri Lankan independence activists
- List of University of Oxford people in public life overseas
- List of alumni of University College, Oxford
