= Monaragala Electoral District (1960–1989) =

Electoral district of Sri Lanka from 1960–1989

Monaragala electoral district was an electoral district of Sri Lanka between March 1960 and February 1989. The district was named after the town of Monaragala in Monaragala District, Uva Province. The 1978 Constitution of Sri Lanka introduced the proportional representation electoral system for electing members of Parliament. The existing 160 mainly single-member electoral districts were replaced with 22 multi-member electoral districts. Monaragala electoral district was replaced by the Monaragala multi-member electoral district at the 1989 general elections, the first under the proportional representation system, Monaragala continues to be a polling division of the multi-member electoral district.

== Members of Parliament ==
Key

Independent SLFP UNP

Election	Member	Party	Term
1960 (March)	W. G. M. Albert Silva	Sri Lanka Freedom Party	1960
1960 (July)	W. G. M. Albert Silva	Sri Lanka Freedom Party	1960-1965
1965	Raja Welegama	Sri Lanka Freedom Party	1965-1970
1970	Raja Welegama	Sri Lanka Freedom Party	1970-1977
1977	R. M. Punchi Bandara	United National Party	1970-1988

== Elections ==
=== 1960 (March) Parliamentary General Election ===
Results of the 4th parliamentary election held on 19 March 1960:

Candidate	Party	Symbol	Votes	%
W. G. M. Albert Silva	Sri Lanka Freedom Party	Hand	3,738	37.92
H. E. Senanayake	United National Party	Elephant	2,651	26.90
D. Kadurugamuwa		Ladder	1,359	13.79
D. C. K. Nanayakkara		Rooster	448	4.55
Earle Abeysuriya		Umbrella	378	3.84
R. A. Tilakaratne		Lamp	363	3.68
N. B. Dharmadasa		Sun	353	3.58
Donald Ratnaweera		Key	308	3.13
K.H.M.T.M. de Silva		Star	101	1.03
Valid Votes			9,699	98.40
Rejected Votes			158	1.60
Total Polled			9,857	100.00
Registered Electors			14,494	
Turnout				68.01

=== 1960 (July) Parliamentary General Election ===
Results of the 5th parliamentary election held on 20 July 1960:

Candidate	Party	Symbol	Votes	%
W. G. M. Albert Silva	Sri Lanka Freedom Party	Hand	5,475	57.86
H. E. Senanayake	United National Party	Elephant	3,896	41.17
Valid Votes			9,371	99.03
Rejected Votes			92	0.97
Total Polled			9,463	100.00
Registered Electors			14,494	
Turnout				65.29

=== 1965 Parliamentary General Election ===
Results of the 6th parliamentary election held on 22 March 1965:

Candidate	Party	Symbol	Votes	%
Raja Welegama	Sri Lanka Freedom Party	Hand	8,257	46.14
L. R. M. D. Kadurugamuwa	United National Party	Elephant	6,792	37.96
D. M. Punchibanda	Independent	Lamp	1,054	5.89
A. H. Jayasena	Independent	Umbrella	745	4.16
W. G. M. Albert Silva	National Liberation Front	Aeroplane	701	3.92
Valid Votes			17,549	98.07
Rejected Votes			345	1.93
Total Polled			17,894	100.00
Registered Electors			22,838	
Turnout				78.35

=== 1970 Parliamentary General Election ===
Results of the 7th parliamentary election held on 27 May 1970:

Candidate	Party	Symbol	Votes	%
Raja Welegama	Sri Lanka Freedom Party	Hand	17,342	60.87
A. B. Talagune	United National Party	Elephant	10,435	36.62
B. A. L. Wijewardhana		Ship	468	1.64
Valid Votes			28,245	99.13
Rejected Votes			247	0.87
Total Polled			28,492	100.00
Registered Electors			35,446	
Turnout				80.38

=== 1977 Parliamentary General Election ===
Results of the 8th parliamentary election held on 21 July 1977:

Candidate	Party	Symbol	Votes	%
R. M. Punchi Bandara	United National Party	Elephant	12,316	50.07
Raja Welegama	Sri Lanka Freedom Party	Hand	10,371	42.16
Ratnayake Keerthisinghe		Star	881	3.58
E. W. Ariyapala		Lamp	492	2.0
W. G. M. Albert Silva		Cartwheel	297	1.21
R. M. Somaratne		Umbrella	78	0.32
Valid Votes			24,435	99.33
Rejected Votes			165	0.67
Total Polled			24,600	100.00
Registered Electors			28,711	
Turnout				85.68
