= Leo Fernando =

Ceylonese businessman and politician

Hon. Sir Leo Fernando CBE

Member of the Ceylon Parliament for Buttala
- In office 1947–1954
- Preceded by: Constituency Created
- Succeeded by: Gladwin Kotelawala

Personal details
- Born: Warusahennedige Leo Fernando; 18 November 1895 Pandura, Sri Lanka
- Died: 30 November 1954 (aged 59)
- Party: United National Party
- Spouse: Lady Irene Fernando
- Relations: Ronnie de Mel (son-in-law)
- Children: Mallika de Mel
- Occupation: Businessman

Sir Leo Fernando, CBE (18 November 1895 – 30 November 1954) was a Ceylonese businessman and politician. He was a member of parliament for the Buttala Electoral District.

== Business career ==
Warusahennedige Leo Fernando was born on 18 November 1895 in Panadura. He developed a considerable ownership in the transport sector, having established the Panadura Bus Company and owning transport lorries. He also owned many Tea and Rubber plantations in Ceylon, the Gikiyanakande and Meddegedara estates among them. The Gikiyanakande estate was owned previously by Queen Elizabeth's cousin, Lord Elphinstone. The signing of the deeds at the time of purchase by Fernando were done at Buckingham Palace in 1950. He also owned significant shareholdings in Associated Motorways (AMW), Central Hospitals and the Southwestern Bus Company. The Panadura Bus Company was later nationalised in 1958 to form the Ceylon Transport Board. At the time of his death in 1954, he owned more than 10,000 acres of tea and rubber plantations, and his Panadura Motor Transit (PMT) owned more than 350 buses, 200 lorries; apart from his significant investments in several top companies in Ceylon. He donated the college hall of Sri Sumangala College in his home town of Panadura.

== Political career ==
Fernando was elected to the Parliament of Ceylon at the 1st parliamentary election in 1947 representing the Buttala electorate, securing over 77% of the vote. He retained the seat at the subsequent parliamentary elections in 1952, with a healthy 70% of the vote and remained in parliament until his death in 1954.

== Family ==
He and wife, Lady Irene Fernando, had three daughters and a son. They are Kusumalatha, Mallika, Ranjith and Kanthi. His daughter, Mallika de Mel was the member of parliament for Matara (2001–2003), she had married Ronnie de Mel, a civil servant, who became the member of parliament for Devinuwara (1969–1988), Matara (1994–2000), National List member (2001–2004) and Minister of Finance (1977–1988).

== Car collection ==
Fernando owned a custom built Ford Lincoln Cosmopolitan on which his name was engraved on all the accessories of the car, including the seats. He also owned cars built by Rolls-Royce.

== Honors ==
He was appointed an Officer of the Most Excellent Order of the British Empire (OBE) in the 1951 Birthday Honours and Commander of the Most Excellent Order of the British Empire (CBE) in the 1953 New Year Honours. He was appointed Knights Bachelor in the 1955 New Year Honours, with the appointment being confirmed by the Queen the day before his death on 29 November 1954. The day before his death he was appointed Knights Bachelor on 29 November 1954 in the 1955 New Year Honours.
