= Minister of Highways, Ports & Shipping =

Presidential cabinet position of Sri Lanka

Minister of Highways, Ports & Shipping of Sri Lanka
- Ministry of Highways, Ports & Shipping
- Final holder: Mahinda Rajapaksa
- Abolished: 11 January 2015

The Minister of Highways, Ports & Shipping was an appointment in the Cabinet of Sri Lanka that was responsible for the creation, development, implementation and the governance of the highways, ports and their transport services and the headquarters of the institutions under the ministry. The post was first created in 1960 March as Minister of Nationalized Services, Shipping & Transport, in 1960 July it was renamed as the Minister of Commerce, Trade, Food & Shipping. The section Highways was included in the post of the Minister of Irrigation, Power & Highways in both, 1970 and 1977 years. In the 1977, the section Shipping was included in the Minister of Shipping, Aviation & Tourism. In 1989 The responsibilities of the sections Ports and Shipping were under the Minister of Ports & Shipping and the Minister of Trade & Shipping and the responsibilities of section Highways were under the Minister of Transport & Highways. In 2000 the section of Ports was under the Minister of Ports Development & Development of the South, the section Highways was under the Minister of Highways, the section of Shipping was under the Minister of Internal & International Trade Commerce, Muslim Religious Affairs & Shipping Development. The responsibilities of the sections of Highways and into some distance Shipping too were under the Minister of Transport, Highways & Aviation in 2001. The section Highways was under the Minister of Highways & Road Development and the sections Ports and Shipping were under the Minister of Ports & Aviation in 2005. The original name Minister of Highways, Ports and Shipping was given for the post in 2010. The position was abolished and divided into the portfolios of the Minister of Ports and Shipping and Ministry of Higher Education and Highways with the portfolio reshuffle in January 2015 under the Sirisena cabinet.

== List of highways, ports & shipping ministers ==
Parties

Sri Lanka Freedom Party United National Party Sri Lanka Muslim Congress

#	Portrait	Name	Party	Tenure	Head(s) of Government	Ministerial title
1		Montague Jayawickrama	United National Party	23 March 1960 - 1960 July	Dudley Senanayake	Minister of Nationalised Services, Shipping & Transport
2		T. B. Ilangaratne	Sri Lanka Freedom Party	23 July 1960 - 1965	Sirimavo Bandaranaike	Minister of Commerce, Trade, Food & Shipping
3		Maithripala Senanayake	Sri Lanka Freedom Party	31 May 1970 - 1977	Sirimavo Bandaranaike	Minister of Irrigation, Power & Highways
4		Gamini Dissanayake	United National Party	23 July 1977 - 2 January 1989	Junius Richard Jayewardene	Minister of Irrigation, Power & Highways
4		Wimala Kannangara	United National Party	23 July 1977 - 2 January 1989	Junius Richard Jayewardene	Minister of Shipping, Aviation & Tourism
5		Alick Aluvihare	United National Party	14 March 1991 - 1 May 1993	Ranasinghe Premadasa	Minister of Ports & Shipping
5		Rupasena Karunatilake	United National Party		Ranasinghe Premadasa	Minister of Ports & Shipping
5		Abdul Razak Munsoor		18 February 1989 - May 1993	Ranasinghe Premadasa	Minister of Trade & Shipping
5		Wijayapala Mendis	United National Party	1989 - 1993	Ranasinghe Premadasa	Minister of Transport & Highways
7		Ronnie de Mel	Sri Lanka Freedom Party	18 October 2000 - 10 October 2001	Chandrika Kumaratunga	Minister of Ports Development & Development of the South
7		A. H. M.Fowzie	Sri Lanka Freedom Party	18 October 2000 - 10 October 2001	Chandrika Kumaratunga	Minister of Highways
7		Rauff Hakeem	Sri Lanka Muslim Congress	18 October 2000 - 10 October 2001	Chandrika Kumaratunga	Minister of Internal & International Trade Commerce, Muslim Religious Affairs & Shipping Development
8		Gamini Athukorala	United National Party	19 December 2001 - 7 February 2004	Ranil Wickremasinghe	Minister of Transport, Highways & Aviation
9		Jeyaraj Fernandopulle	Sri Lanka Freedom Party	22 April 2004 - 6 April 2008	Mahinda Rajapaksa	Minister of Highways & Road Development
9	Mahinda Rajapaksa	Mahinda Rajapaksa	Sri Lanka Freedom Party	22 April 2004 - 19 November 2005	Chandrika Kumaratunga	Minister of Highways
9		Mangala Samaraweera	Sri Lanka Freedom Party	22 April 2004 - 9 February 2010	Mahinda Rajapaksa	Minister of Ports & Aviation Services
10	Mahinda Rajapaksa	Mahinda Rajapaksa	Sri Lanka Freedom Party	23 April 2010 – present	Mahinda Rajapaksa	Ministry of Highways, Ports & Shipping

== See also ==
- Ministry of Highways, Ports & Shipping
