= Gladwin Kotelawala =

Ceylonese (Sri Lankan) businessman and a former Member of Parliament

Hon. Gladwin Kotelawala MBE

Member of the Ceylon Parliament for Buttala
- In office 1955–1956
- Preceded by: Leo Fernando
- Succeeded by: W. G. M. Albert Silva

Personal details
- Born: 18 April 1914
- Party: United National Party
- Spouse: Muriel née Wettasinghe
- Relations: Henry (father), Evelyn née Bulathsinhala (mother)
- Education: Royal College, Trinity College
- Occupation: Politician

Gladwin Conrad Hermon Kotelawala, MBE (18 April 1914 – ?) was a Ceylonese (Sri Lankan) businessmen and a former Member of Parliament.

Gladwin Kotelawala was the son of Sir Henry Kotelawala, a leading colonial-era legislator. He initially studied at Royal College, Colombo, before his father transferred him to Trinity College, Kandy. Kotelawala ran away to India before completing his studies, after his family located him and brought him back home he ran away again this time to Singapore, where he resisted all attempts to repatriate him. Kotelawala's move to Malaya allowed him to establish a successful business and become a prominent member of the Ceylonese community there. With the onset of World War II and the subsequent Japanese occupation of Malaya, he served as a price control inspector in Malacca before joining the Indian Independence League (IIL) of Subhas Chandra Bose and forming the Ceylon Department serving as its secretary.

His role in the IIL is controversial and after the end of the war he was briefly arrested but soon released by the British. On his return to Ceylon he entered politics and became a member of the Badulla Urban Council. He was made a Member of the Order of the British Empire for social services in Uva Province in the 1952 Birthday Honours, which led to the belief that Kotelawala acted as an agent for British Intelligence in Malaya. Following the death of Sir Leo Fernando, the sitting member for the Buttala electorate, Kotelawala ran, as the United National Party candidate, and was elected at subsequent parliamentary by-election held on 5 March 1955. At the 3rd parliamentary election, held between 5 April 1956 and 10 April 1956, he was unable to retain his seat and was defeated by the Sri Lanka Freedom Party candidate, W. G. M. Albert Silva, by 3,281 votes.

== See also ==
- List of political families in Sri Lanka
