= John Duffy (writer) =

Canadian political strategist and writer (1963–2022)

- Born: November 5, 1963; Toronto, Ontario, Canada
- Died: March 3, 2022 (aged 58); Toronto, Ontario, Canada
- Occupations: Political scientist, biographer
- Spouse: Jill Presser
- Children: 2
- Writing career
- Notable works: Fights of Our Lives: Elections, Leadership and the Making of Canada

John Duffy (November 5, 1963 – March 3, 2022) was a Canadian political strategist and writer.

== Biography ==
Duffy was a principal at StrategyCorp, a public affairs, communications, and management consulting firm in Toronto and Ottawa. He was best known to the general public for Fights of Our Lives: Elections, Leadership and the Making of Canada, his 2002 book which analyzed five historically important Canadian federal elections. The book won the Shaughnessy Cohen Prize for Political Writing.

Duffy was a former strategist for the Liberal Party of Canada. He served as a policy advisor to Paul Martin, and was involved in the development of the Red Book, the Liberals' platform in the 1993 election. Following his departure from electoral politics, he cofounded StrategyCorp.

Duffy died in Toronto on March 3, 2022, at the age of 58.
