= Jake Warren =

Canadian diplomat (1921–2008)

Jack Hamilton Warren O.C.

Canadian Ambassador to the United States
- In office 1975–1977
- Prime Minister: Pierre Trudeau
- Preceded by: Marcel Cadieux
- Succeeded by: Peter Towe

Canadian High Commissioner to the United Kingdom
- In office 1971–1974
- Prime Minister: Pierre Trudeau
- Preceded by: Charles Ritchie
- Succeeded by: Paul Martin Sr.

Personal details
- Born: April 10, 1921 Howard Township, Kent County, Ontario
- Died: April 1, 2008 (aged 86) Ottawa, Ontario
- Occupation: public servant and diplomat

Jack Hamilton (Jake) Warren (April 10, 1921 – April 1, 2008) was a diplomat, civil servant and banker. Jake Warren began his career at the Department of External Affairs in 1945 after serving in the Royal Canadian Navy during World War II, but served in civil service posts from the late 1950s to early 1970s:

- Deputy Minister, Department of Trade and Commerce (1958–1960; 1964–1971)
- Canadian representative to the General Agreement on Tariffs and Trade (1960–1964)

He returned to a diplomatic role as the Canadian High Commissioner to the United Kingdom from 1971 to 1974, then Canadian Ambassador to the United States from 1975 to 1977.

He was Vice-Chairman and a Director of the Bank of Montreal from 1979 to 1986. From 1986 to 1990, he was the Deputy North America Chairman of the Trilateral Commission and served as trade advisor to Quebec.

In 1982, he was made an Officer of the Order of Canada.

== Sources ==
- "Canadian Who's Who 1997 entry". University of Toronto Press.
