= David MacNaughton =

Canadian diplomat and businessman

David MacNaughton OOnt
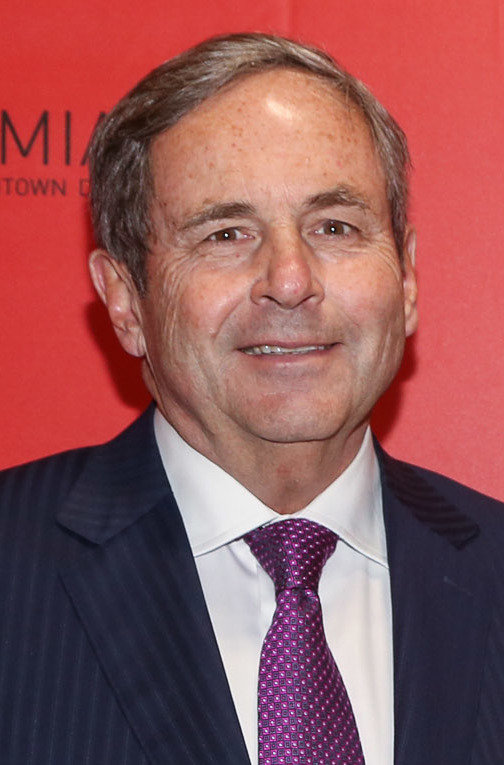
- MacNaughton at the 2017 Miami International Film Festival

Canadian Ambassador to the United States
- In office March 3, 2016 – August 31, 2019
- Prime Minister: Justin Trudeau
- Preceded by: Gary Doer
- Succeeded by: Kirsten Hillman

Personal details
- Education: University of New Brunswick

David MacNaughton is a Canadian businessman, diplomat, political advisor and strategy consultant who was the chairman of StrategyCorp, a public affairs consulting firm. MacNaughton served as the Canadian ambassador to the United States from 2016 to 2019; he succeeded Gary Doer and presented his diplomatic papers to U.S. President Barack Obama on March 2, 2016. MacNaughton is currently a Strategic Advisor at CIBC, in the Office of the CEO. He was previously president of Palantir Technologies Canada, a post for which he resigned his ambassadorship.

MacNaugton is credited by Canadian Business with "changing the face of public affairs in Canada" through the co-creation of the firm Public Affairs Resource Group (PARG), which in 1987 brought the services of public affairs and the polling firm Decima Research under one roof.

== Background ==
Prior to his appointment, MacNaughton was chairman at StrategyCorp, a Canadian public affairs and communications firm. MacNaughton also served as Canadian and North American president of Hill and Knowlton, and president of Public Affairs International, which purchased Decima Research to create Public Affairs Resource Group.

== Politics ==
MacNaughton's public sector experience includes work at both the federal and provincial levels of government. At the federal level, he spent six years as a senior advisor to Don Jamieson, successively Minister for the Government of Canada's Departments of Transport, Industry and Foreign Affairs. A longtime Liberal Party of Canada activist, MacNaughton has been involved federally in numerous election and political campaigns.

In Ontario, he co-chaired David Peterson's successful 1987 election campaign, and was a senior advisor to Dalton McGuinty in the 2003 election. Following that election, from October 2003 until May 2005 MacNaughton served as principal secretary to McGuinty.

In 2015, MacNaughton served as Ontario co-chair for the federal Liberal campaign that was successful in electing Justin Trudeau as prime minister.

In 2020, MacNaughton was found to have violated Canada's Conflict of Interest Act after offering pro bono work to several public office holders on behalf of Palantir Technologies Canada, of which he is president.

== Opinions ==
MacNaughton has been an outspoken advocate of government using asset sales in order to invest in new infrastructure. He has also urged government to adopt a program of fundamental change in how it operates in order to more efficiently provide services.

== Other activities ==
MacNaughton has served on the boards of the North York General Hospital, the Toronto International Film Festival, the Stratford Festival, TVOntario and the Toronto French School.

== Personal life ==
MacNaughton's partner is Leslie Noble, formerly of the public affairs firm StrategyCorp. Noble has worked for the Ontario Progressive Conservative Party for several elections, notably as co-campaign manager with Tom Long on the "Common Sense Revolution" which won majority governments in 1995 and 1999.
