= Charles Ritchie (diplomat) =

Canadian diplomat and diarist (1906–1995)

Canadian Ambassador to West Germany
- In office 1954–1958
- Preceded by: Thomas Clayton Davis
- Succeeded by: Escott Reid

Permanent Representative of Canada to the United Nations
- In office 1958–1962
- Preceded by: Robert Alexander MacKay
- Succeeded by: Paul Tremblay

Canadian Ambassador to the United States
- In office 1962–1966
- Preceded by: Norman Robertson
- Succeeded by: Edgar Ritchie

Canadian Ambassador to the North Atlantic Council
- In office 1966–1967
- Preceded by: George Ignatieff
- Succeeded by: Ross Campbell

High Commission of Canada in the United Kingdom
- In office 1967–1971
- Preceded by: Lionel Chevrier
- Succeeded by: Jake Warren

Personal details
- Born: Charles Stewart Almon Ritchie; September 23, 1906 Halifax, Nova Scotia
- Died: June 7, 1995 (aged 88) Ottawa, Ontario
- Spouse: Sylvia Smellie
- Relations: Roland Ritchie, brother

Charles Stewart Almon Ritchie, CC (September 23, 1906 – June 7, 1995) was a Canadian diplomat and diarist.

Born in Halifax, Nova Scotia, Ritchie was educated at the University of King's College, in Halifax, Nova Scotia, Pembroke College, Oxford, Harvard University, and École Libre des Sciences Politiques. He joined the Department of External Affairs in 1934 eventually becoming Canada's ambassador to West Germany (1954–1958), Permanent Representative to the United Nations (1958–1962), ambassador to the United States during the presidencies of John F. Kennedy and Lyndon Johnson (1962–1966), ambassador to the North Atlantic Council (1966–1967) and from 1967 to 1971 was Canadian High Commissioner to the United Kingdom in London.

While Ritchie's career as a diplomat marked him as an important person in the history of Canadian foreign relations, he became famous through the publication of his diaries, first The Siren Years, and then three follow-ups. The diaries document both his diplomatic career and his private life, including the beginning of his long love affair with the Anglo-Irish writer Elizabeth Bowen, which began in 1941 when he was still single and she married, survived through his marriage in 1948 and long periods of separation, lasting until Bowen's death in 1973.

In 1969, he was made a Companion of the Order of Canada "for services in the field of diplomacy". He received honorary doctorates from Trent University (1976), York University (1992), and Carleton University (1992).

Ritchie came from a prominent family in Nova Scotia. His brother, Roland Ritchie, continuing a family tradition in the law, was a puisne justice of the Supreme Court of Canada.

== Selected works ==
- The Siren Years: A Canadian Diplomat Abroad 1937–1945 Toronto: Macmillan, 1974. ISBN 0-7710-7526-X, winner of the 1974 Governor General's Award for non-fiction.
- An Appetite for Life: The Education of a Young Diarist, 1924–1927 Toronto: Macmillan, 1977. ISBN 0-7705-1573-8.
- Diplomatic Passport Toronto: Macmillan, 1981. ISBN 0-7715-9587-5.
- Storm Signals Toronto: Macmillan, 1983. ISBN 0-7715-9782-7.
