= Marcel Cadieux =

Canadian civil servant and diplomat

Marcel Cadieux C.C.
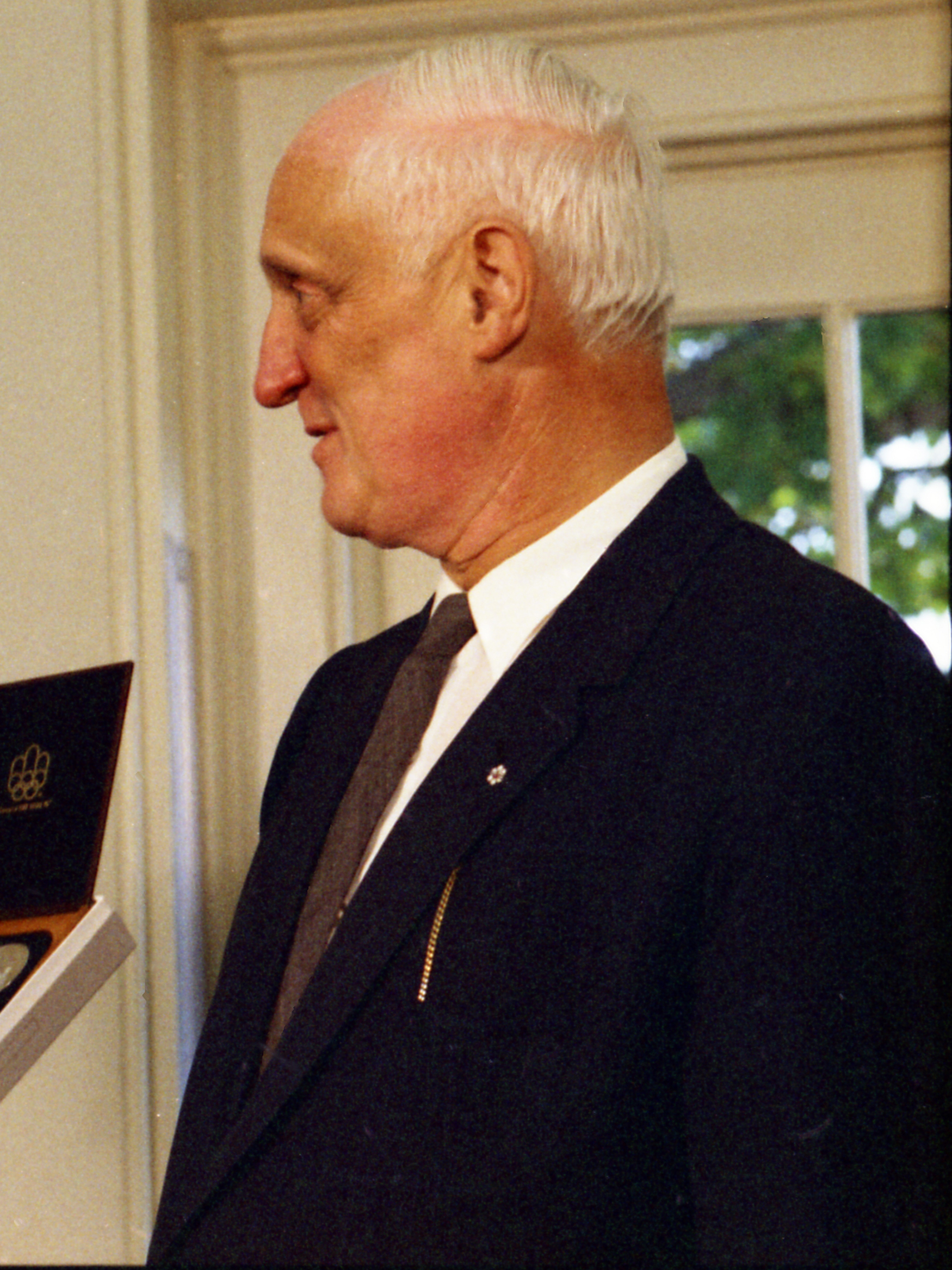

Canadian Ambassador to the United States
- In office 1970–1975
- Prime Minister: Pierre Trudeau
- Preceded by: Edgar Ritchie
- Succeeded by: Jake Warren

Personal details
- Born: June 17, 1915 Montreal, Quebec, Canada
- Died: March 19, 1981 (aged 65) Pompano Beach, Florida, U.S.

Marcel Cadieux, CC (June 17, 1915 – March 19, 1981) was a Canadian civil servant and diplomat.

== Early life and education ==
Cadieux was born in Montreal, Quebec. He studied at the Collège André Grasset, obtained a master's degree in law from the Université de Montréal, and studied constitutional law at McGill University in Montreal.

== Career ==
Cadieux joined the Department of External Affairs in 1941, served as senior adviser to Canadian members of the International Control Commission in Vietnam in 1954, and became the legal advisor to the Department of External Affairs in 1956.

A professor of international law at the University of Ottawa, he was the first Canadian to sit on the United Nations International Law Commission. From 1964 to 1970, he was Under-Secretary of State for External Affairs.

Cadieux served on the negotiating committee to determine maritime boundaries with the United States. He was Canada's first francophone Ambassador to the United States from 1970 to 1975, and head of the Canadian Mission to the European Communities from 1975.

He was appointed to advise the Royal Canadian Mounted Police (RCMP) in 1978. He also wrote several books on Canadian diplomacy.

In 1969, he was made a Companion of the Order of Canada.

== Family ==
He married Anita Comtois, and they had two sons.
