= Peter Towe =

Canadian diplomat and businessman

Peter Milburn Towe OC

Canadian Ambassador to the United States
- In office 1977–1981
- Prime Minister: Pierre Trudeau; Joe Clark
- Preceded by: Jake Warren
- Succeeded by: Allan Gotlieb

Personal details
- Born: November 1, 1922 London, Ontario
- Died: January 29, 2015 (aged 92)
- Occupation: diplomat

Peter Milburn Towe (November 1, 1922 – January 29, 2015) was a Canadian diplomat and businessman.

Born in London, Ontario, he received a Bachelor of Arts degree in Economics from the University of Western Ontario and a Master of Arts degree in economics from Queen's University.

During World War II, he served as an Officer with the Royal Canadian Air Force Bomber Command. He joined the Department of External Affairs in 1947. From 1972 to 1975, he was the Canadian representative to the Organisation for Economic Co-operation and Development. From 1975 to 1977, he was the Assistant Under-Secretary of State for External Affairs. From 1977 to 1981, he was the Canadian Ambassador to the United States of America.

From 1981 to 1991, he was the chairman of the Petro-Canada International Assistance Corporation.

In 1994, he was made an Officer of the Order of Canada.

He died on January 29, 2015, as a result of a fall.
