= Kirsten Hillman =

Canadian diplomat

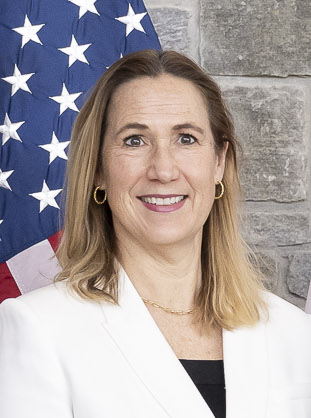
- Hillman in 2024

Canadian Ambassador to the United States
- In office August 31, 2019 – February 15, 2026; Acting: August 31, 2019 — March 26, 2020
- Prime Minister: Justin Trudeau; Mark Carney
- Preceded by: David MacNaughton
- Succeeded by: Mark Wiseman

Personal details
- Born: 1968 or 1969 (age 57–58) Winnipeg, Manitoba, Canada
- Education: University of Manitoba (BA); McGill University (JD, BCL)
- Profession: Lawyer; diplomat

Kirsten Hillman is a Canadian lawyer and diplomat who served as the Canadian ambassador to the United States from 2019 to 2026. She is the first woman to serve in this role. In 2019, she had been appointed as acting ambassador, taking over from David MacNaughton. Prior to this, she served as deputy ambassador at the Embassy of Canada in Washington, D.C.

In December 2025, Hillman announced she would step down as ambassador to the United States in the new year.

== Early life and education ==
Hillman grew up in Calgary and Winnipeg. She has a Bachelor of Arts degree from the University of Manitoba (1990), as well as civil law and common law degrees from McGill University.

== Career ==
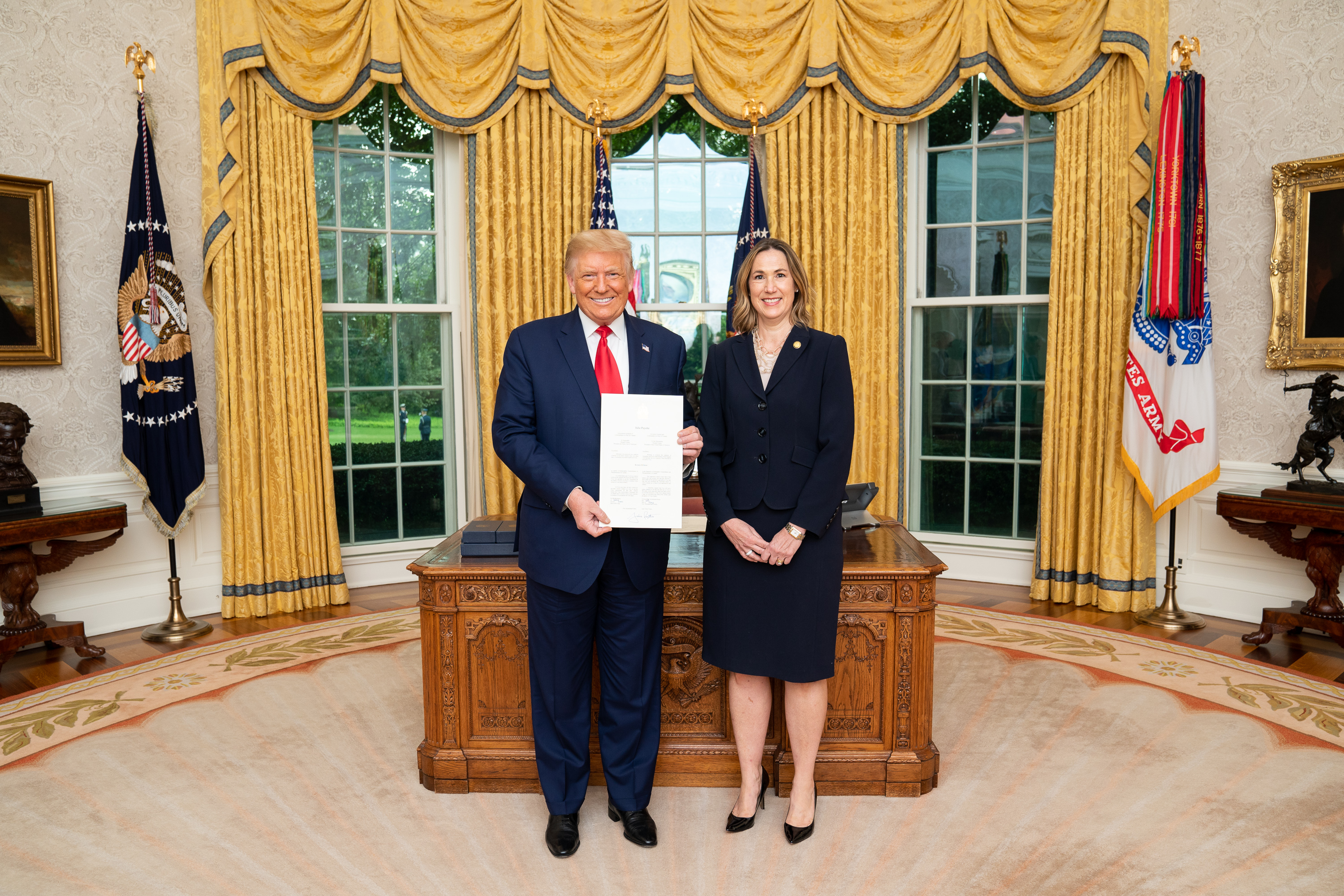
Hillman showing Julie Payette's credentials to U.S. president Donald Trump in the White House's Oval Office, 2020

Hillman worked as a lawyer in private practice in Montreal, and for the Department of Justice in Ottawa. She was assistant deputy minister of the trade agreements and negotiations branch at Global Affairs Canada, serving as Canada's senior legal adviser to the World Trade Organization and chief negotiator for the Comprehensive and Progressive Agreement for Trans-Pacific Partnership.

In August 2017, Hillman began working at the Canadian embassy in Washington, D.C., serving as deputy ambassador before being appointed acting ambassador when David MacNaughton resigned in August 2019. She played a central role in 2018 negotiations for a replacement to the North American Free Trade Agreement and in keeping the Canada–United States border open to trade and commerce during the COVID-19 pandemic.

Prime Minister Justin Trudeau announced Hillman's appointment as ambassador to the U.S. on March 26, 2020, making her the first woman to hold the post. Her appointment was viewed as a choice that would find favour among both Conservatives and Liberals. Following Mark Carney's appointment as Prime Minister, Hillman was named as the lead negotiator in trade talks with the U.S. during the 2025 United States trade war with Canada and Mexico.

On December 9, 2025, Hillman announced that she would end her tenure in 2026. Following that announcement, figures on both sides of the border, including Prime Minister Mark Carney, United States trade representative Jamieson Greer, United States ambassador to Canada Pete Hoekstra, and former Canadian prime ministers Justin Trudeau and Stephen Harper, commended her contributions to Canada-United States relations.

On December 22, 2025, Prime Minister Mark Carney announced that Mark Wiseman would succeed Hillman as Canadian ambassador to the United States.

== Honours ==
In June 2025, Hillman was awarded the King Charles III Coronation Medal.

She was named one of Washington’s most powerful women by the Washingtonian in 2021, 2023, and 2025.

In June 2022, she received an honorary Doctor of Laws degree from the Royal Military College of Canada.

She was recognized in the Maclean's magazine 2022 Power List, 50 Canadians who are forging paths, leading the debate and shaping how we think and live.
