= Michael Cautillo =

Canadian civil engineer

- Born: March 17, 1955 (age 71)
- Other name: Michele Cautillo
- Occupation: professional engineer
- Known for: appointed to build the Gordie Howe International Bridge

Michael Cautillo is a Canadian civil engineer, who was appointed the president and CEO of the Windsor-Detroit Bridge Authority.

Minister of Transport Lisa Raitt appointed Cautillo on July 30, 2014. Cautillo laid out his plans during interviews on CBET-DT and CBEW-FM on August 25, 2014. Cautillo says he aims to have the bridge completed during 2020.

Cautillo was one of the engineers working on plans for the bridge in the eight years that preceded announcing the bridge authority. Prior to being appointed president of the bridge authority, he worked for Deloitte Touche’s Ontario Infrastructure Advisory and Project Finance group. Before joining Deloitte Cautillo spent close to 24 years working at the Ontario Ministry of Transportation and the Ontario Transportation Capital Corporation working on a number of major transportation infrastructure projects including 7.5 years on the Highway 407 Project. Cautillo resigned as the Bridge Authority's first president and CEO in December 2017. Cautillo Joined StrategyCorp as a special advisor in February 2019.
