= Mallika de Mel =

Sri Lankan politician (1932–2009)

Hon. Mallika de Mel

Member of Parliament for Matara electorate
- In office 2000–2004

Personal details
- Born: Mallika Fernando
- Died: October 2009
- Party: United National Party
- Spouse: Ronnie de Mel
- Relations: Sir Leo Fernando (father)
- Children: 3 (Sunalini, Tara, Renuka)
- Occupation: Social worker

Mallika de Mel (née Fernando; 17 January 1932 – October 2009) was a Sri Lankan social worker and politician. She was a Member of Parliament from the Matara electorate from 2001 to 2004.

Mallika Fernando, was born to Sir Leo Fernando and Lady Irene Fernando. Her father was one of the wealthiest businessmen of his time and a member of parliament. She married Ronnie de Mel, who was a member of the Ceylon Civil Service and would later enter politics, having been elected to parliament from the Matara electorate and went on to serve as Minister of Finance from 1977 to 1988. The couple had three children.

An active social worker, she was a principal trustee of the Ruhuna University Trust and was noted for securing the release of Rohana Wijeweera in 1977. Mallika Fernando succeeded her husband's seat in the 2001 parliamentary elections, entering parliament from the United National Party. She turned down the party nomination for re-election due to health issues.

== See also ==
- List of political families in Sri Lanka
