= Oliver Weerasinghe =

Oliver Weerasinghe OBE, FRIBA

Ambassador to the United States

Personal details
- Born: 29 September 1907 Colombo, Ceylon
- Died: 20 January 1980 (aged 72) Colombo, Sri Lanka
- Education: University of Liverpool, Royal College, Colombo
- Occupation: diplomat, civil servant
- Profession: Architect

Oliver Weerasinghe (29 September 1907 – 20 January 1980) was a Sri Lankan architect and diplomat. He was Sri Lanka's first City Planner and for this reason, he is referred to as the "Father of Sri Lanka's Town Planning". He is a former Ambassador to the United States.

Weerasinghe was educated at the Royal College Colombo and went on to study architecture at the University of Liverpool under Sir Patrick Abercrombie. Later he became a Fellow of the Royal Institute of British Architects and a Fellow of the Royal Town Planning Institute. He was a founding President of the Ceylon Institute of Architects.

He gained wide recognition when he designed the "Lake House Building", the head office of the Associated Newspapers of Ceylon, owned by press baron D. R. Wijewardena. He then became Ceylon's first city planner, when he was appointed to the newly created post of Architect and City Planner of Ceylon, as the head of Ceylon's first Department of Town and Country Planning. In this capacity he was instrumental in the planning and development of the new city of Anuradhapura in the 1940s as a step to preserving the ancient city. He headed a committee to study housing development on the island of Ceylon and its recommendations lead to the creation of the Ministry for Housing in 1954. He was appointed a Members of the Order of the British Empire (MBE) in the 1951 New Year Honours and an Officer of the Order of the British Empire (OBE) in the 1956 New Year Honours.

In 1956, he joined the United Nations and was later appointed as Sri Lanka's Ambassador to the United States. During his tenure, he established four consulates and the Buddhist Temple of Washington, D.C.

Oliver Weerasinghe married Christobel Kotelawala, the only daughter of Sir Henry Kotelawala, a member of the State Council of Ceylon from Uva and Badulla for 28 years. Their son Rohan is a Senior Managing Partner of a major law firm and daughter, Menakka, is a former lecturer at the University of Michigan.

Weerasinghe died at Viharamahadevi Park, aged 72, after suffering a heart attack during a morning walk.
