= List of ambassadors of Canada to the United States =

This is a list of ambassadors of Canada to the United States, formally titled as Ambassador Extraordinary and Plenipotentiary to the United States of America for His [Her] Majesty's Government in Canada. Originally, Canada's top diplomatic representative to the U.S. had the rank of Envoy Extraordinary and Minister Plenipotentiary. The title was promoted to the rank of Ambassador Extraordinary and Plenipotentiary in 1943, during the period when Leighton McCarthy had the post.

Before November 25, 1926, Canada was represented in Washington D.C. by the British ambassador to the United States.

Most Canadian ambassadors to the United States have been political appointees to the position. A few (Chrétien, Pearson, Charles Ritchie, Edgar Ritchie, Kirsten Hillman, and Wrong) were career diplomats or spent most of their career at the Department of External Affairs (or its successors).

== Envoy Extraordinary and Minister Plenipotentiary ==
#	Name	Picture	Took office	Left office	Prime Minister(s)
1	Vincent Massey		November 25, 1926	July 23, 1930	William Lyon Mackenzie King
—	H. H. Wrong (Chargé d'Affaires ad interim)		July 23, 1930	March 9, 1931	William Lyon Mackenzie King; R. B. Bennett
2	W.D. Herridge		March 9, 1931	1935	R. B. Bennett
—	H. H. Wrong (Chargé d'Affaires ad interim)		1935	1936	R. B. Bennett; William Lyon Mackenzie King
3	Sir Herbert Marler		1936	1939	William Lyon Mackenzie King
4	Loring Christie		1939	1941	William Lyon Mackenzie King
5	Leighton McCarthy		1941	1943	William Lyon Mackenzie King

== Ambassador Extraordinary and Plenipotentiary ==
#	Name	Picture	Took office	Left office	Prime Minister(s)
5	Leighton McCarthy		1943	1944	William Lyon Mackenzie King
6	Lester B. Pearson		1944	1946	William Lyon Mackenzie King
7	H. H. Wrong		1946	1953	William Lyon Mackenzie King Louis St. Laurent
8	A.D.P. Heeney		1953	1957	Louis St. Laurent
9	Norman Robertson		1957	1958	John Diefenbaker
—	A.D.P. Heeney		1959	1962	John Diefenbaker
10	C.S.A. Ritchie		1962	1966	John Diefenbaker Lester B. Pearson
11	A.E. Ritchie		1966	1970	Lester B. Pearson Pierre Elliott Trudeau
12	Marcel Cadieux		1970	1975	Pierre Elliott Trudeau
13	Jake Warren		1975	1977	Pierre Elliott Trudeau
14	Peter Towe		1977	1981	Joseph Clark Pierre Elliott Trudeau
15	Allan Gotlieb		1981	1989	Pierre Elliott Trudeau John Turner Brian Mulroney
16	Derek Burney		1989	1993	Brian Mulroney Kim Campbell
17	John de Chastelain		1993	1994	Jean Chrétien
18	Raymond Chrétien		1994	2000	Jean Chrétien
19	Michael Kergin		October 26, 2000	February 28, 2005	Jean Chrétien Paul Martin
20	Frank McKenna		March 8, 2005	March 13, 2006	Paul Martin Stephen Harper
21	Michael Wilson		March 13, 2006	October 19, 2009	Stephen Harper
22	Gary Doer		October 19, 2009	March 3, 2016	Stephen Harper Justin Trudeau
23	David MacNaughton		March 3, 2016	August 31, 2019	Justin Trudeau
24	Kirsten Hillman		March 26, 2020 Acting Ambassador from August 31, 2019	February 15, 2026	Justin Trudeau Mark Carney
25	Mark Wiseman		February 15, 2026	Incumbent	Mark Carney

== See also ==
- Embassy of Canada, Washington, D.C.
- List of ambassadors of the United States to Canada
