= Buttala Electoral District =

Electoral district of Sri Lanka

Buttala electoral district was an electoral district of Sri Lanka between August 1947 and March 1960. The district was named after the town of Buttala in Moneragala District, Uva Province. The 1978 Constitution of Sri Lanka introduced the proportional representation electoral system for electing members of Parliament. The existing 160 mainly single-member electoral districts were replaced with 22 multi-member electoral districts. Buttala electoral district is now represented by the Monaragala multi-member electoral district.

== Members of Parliament ==
Key

Independent SLFP UNP

Election	Member	Party	Term
1947	Leo Fernando	United National Party	1947 - 1954
1952	Leo Fernando	United National Party	1947 - 1954
1955 by-election	Gladwin Kotelawala	United National Party	1955 - 1956
1956	W. G. M. Albert Silva	Sri Lanka Freedom Party	1956 - 1960

== Elections ==
=== 1947 Parliamentary General Election ===
Results of the 1st parliamentary election held between 23 August 1947 and 20 September 1947:

Candidate	Party	Symbol	Votes	%
Leo Fernando	United National Party	Umbrella	6,903	77.40
T. D. Alexander		Bicycle	1,395	15.64
G. P. Perera		House	385	4.32
Valid Votes			8,683	97.35
Rejected Votes			236	2.65
Total Polled			8,919	100.00
Registered Electors			17,151	
Turnout				52.00

=== 1952 Parliamentary General Election ===
Results of the 2nd parliamentary election held between 24 May 1952 and 30 May 1952:

Candidate	Party	Symbol	Votes	%
Leo Fernando	United National Party	Umbrella	8,296	70.13
W. G. M. Albert Silva	Sri Lanka Freedom Party	Elephant	1,272	10.75
S. M. Jayawardena		Wheel	1,029	8.70
Earl Abesuriya		Star	934	7.90
Valid Votes			11,531	97.47
Rejected Votes			299	2.53
Total Polled			11,830	100.00
Registered Electors			20,127	
Turnout				58.78

=== 1955 Parliamentary By Election ===
Results of the 1955 parliamentary by-election held on 5 March 1955, following the death of the sitting member, Sir Leo Fernando:

Candidate	Party	Symbol	Votes	%
Gladwin Kotelawala		Umbrella	7,865	69.00
Earl Abesuriya		Star	3,363	29.50
Valid Votes			11,228	98.50
Rejected Votes			171	1.50
Total Polled			11,399	100.00
Registered Electors			20,127	
Turnout				56.64

=== 1956 Parliamentary General Election ===
Results of the 3rd parliamentary election held between 5 April 1956 and 10 April 1956:

Candidate	Party	Symbol	Votes	%
W. G. M. Albert Silva	Sri Lanka Freedom Party	Hand	7,416	63.56
Gladwin Kotelawala	United National Party	Elephant	4,135	35.44
Valid Votes			11,501	98.58
Rejected Votes			166	1.42
Total Polled			11,667	100.00
Registered Electors			24,353	
Turnout				47.91
