= Leighton McCarthy =

Canadian politician (1869–1952)

The Honourable Leighton Goldie McCarthy PC
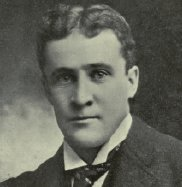

Ambassador of Canada to the United States
- In office 24 February 1941 – 31 December 1944
- Prime Minister: W. L. Mackenzie King
- Preceded by: New position
- Succeeded by: Lester B. Pearson

Member of Parliament for Simcoe North
- In office 14 December 1898 – 21 September 1911
- Preceded by: Dalton McCarthy
- Succeeded by: John Allister Currie

Personal details
- Born: 15 December 1869 Walkerton, Ontario, Canada
- Died: 3 October 1952 (aged 82) Toronto, Ontario, Canada
- Party: Independent (1898–1911); Liberal (1911–?)
- Relations: Dalton McCarthy (uncle)
- Occupation: Ambassador; lawyer

Leighton Goldie McCarthy PC (15 December 1869 – 3 October 1952) was a Canadian lawyer, politician, businessman and diplomat.

== Life and career ==
Born in Walkerton, Ontario, McCarthy was called to the Ontario Bar in 1892. He was elected to the House of Commons of Canada in 1898 as an independent representing the riding of Simcoe North, following the death of the incumbent, his grandfather Dalton McCarthy, in a carriage accident. He was re-elected in 1900 and 1904 but was defeated in 1911, when he ran as a Liberal.

In 1928, McCarthy became president of the Canada Life Assurance Company. In 1941, he was appointed to the Queen's Privy Council for Canada.

From 1941 to 1944, McCarthy served as Canada's top diplomatic representative in Washington, D.C., and he became the first Canadian ambassador to the United States (previously, the position was called Envoy Extraordinary and Minister Plenipotentiary). McCarthy was a lawyer before and after his political and diplomatic appointment but ended his practice in 1946.

McCarthy moved to Toronto and built a house at 45 Walmer Road in 1932, and he died here in 1952. McCarthy bequeathed his home to the University of Toronto. Since 1953, the building has housed the university's Institute of Child Study.

== Archives ==
There is a Leighton G. McCarthy and family fonds at Library and Archives Canada. Archival reference number is R4172.
