= Edgar Ritchie =

Canadian diplomat (1916–2002)

Albert Edgar Ritchie C.C.

Canadian Ambassador to the United States
- In office 1966–1970
- Prime Minister: Lester Pearson; Pierre Trudeau
- Preceded by: Charles Ritchie
- Succeeded by: Marcel Cadieux

Canadian Ambassador to Ireland
- In office 1976–1980
- Prime Minister: Pierre Trudeau
- Preceded by: Harold Morton Maddick
- Succeeded by: Alan William Sullivan

Personal details
- Born: 20 December 1916 Andover, New Brunswick
- Died: 24 January 2002 (aged 85) Ottawa, Ontario
- Education: Mount Allison University (BA); University of Oxford (BA)

Albert Edgar Ritchie, CC (20 December 1916 – 24 January 2002) was a Canadian diplomat.

== Early life and education ==
Born in Andover, New Brunswick, he received a Bachelor of Arts degree in 1938 from Mount Allison University. A Rhodes scholar, he received an additional Bachelor of Arts from the University of Oxford in 1940. On 20 December 1941 he married Gwen Perdue of Ottawa, his wife for 60 years.

== Career ==
In 1944, he joined the Minister of Foreign Affairs and worked in Washington, D.C.

He resigned in 1946 to become Special Assistant to the Assistant Secretary-General for Economic Affairs Department of the United Nations. He re-joined the Minister of Foreign Affairs in 1948 and was posted in London. In 1959, he was appointed Assistant Under-Secretary of State for External Affairs. He served as Deputy Under Secretary of State for External Affairs from August 1964 until July 1966. From 1966 to 1970, he was the Canadian ambassador to the United States. From 1970 to 1974, he held the top job in Canada's foreign service as Under Secretary of State for External Affairs. From 1976 to 1980, he was the Canadian ambassador to Ireland.

In 1973 he received the Government of Canada Public Service Outstanding Achievement Award. In 1975 he was made a Companion of the Order of Canada.

== Death ==
Ritchie died on 24 January 2002, in Ottawa, Ontario.
