= Allan Gotlieb =

Canadian ambassador and civil servant (1928–2020)

Allan Gotlieb CC OM
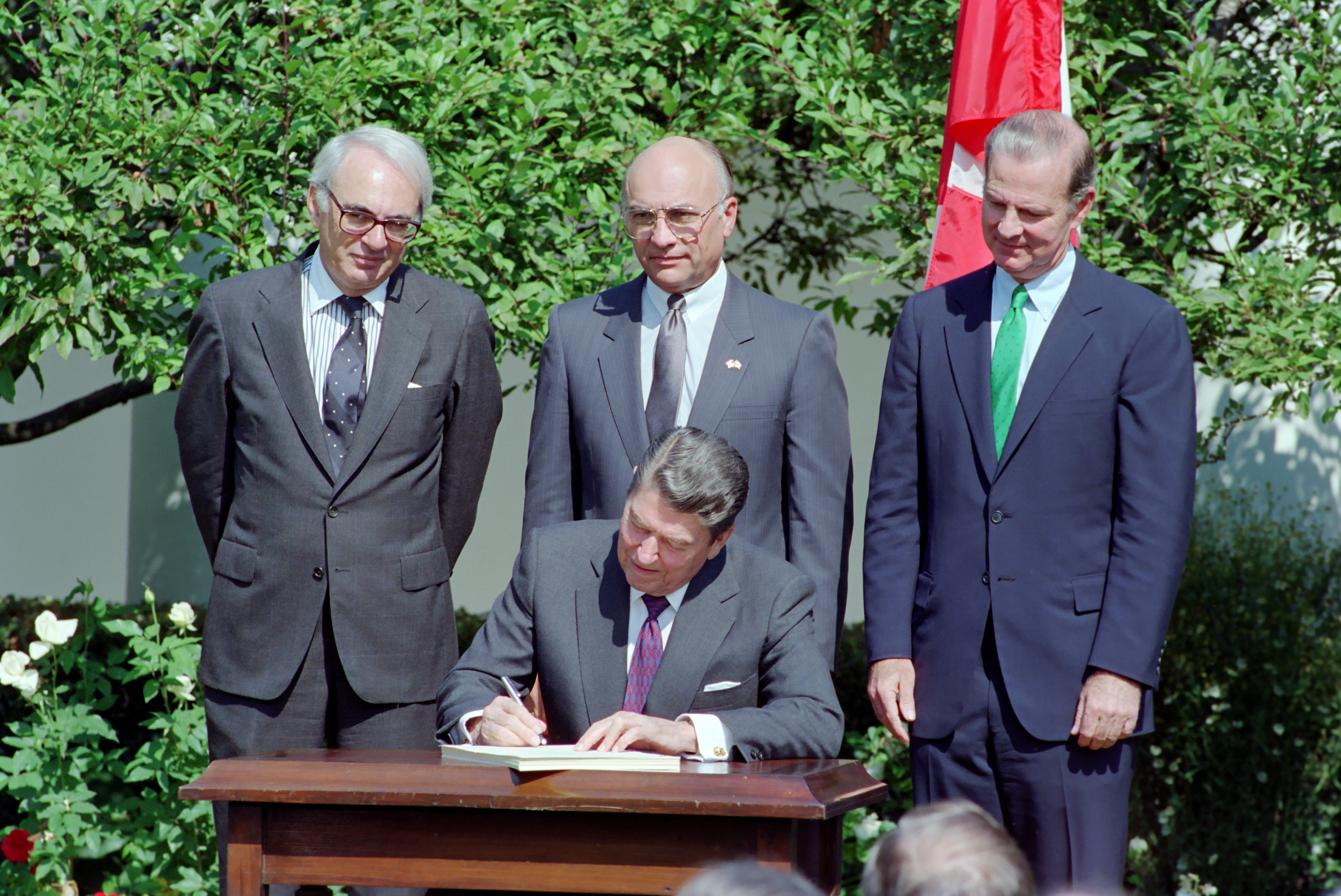
- Gotlieb in 1988

Canadian Ambassador to the United States
- In office 1981–1989
- Prime Minister: Pierre Trudeau; John Turner; Brian Mulroney
- Preceded by: Peter Towe
- Succeeded by: Derek Burney

Under-Secretary of State for External Affairs
- In office 1977–1981
- Minister: Don Jamieson; Flora MacDonald; Mark MacGuigan
- Preceded by: H. Basil Robinson
- Succeeded by: Gordon Osbaldeston

Personal details
- Born: Allan Ezra Gotlieb; February 28, 1928 Winnipeg, Manitoba, Canada
- Died: April 18, 2020 (aged 92) Toronto, Ontario, Canada
- Spouse: Sondra Gotlieb (m. 1955)
- Children: 3
- Education: University of California, Berkeley; University of Oxford; Harvard University
- Profession: Lawyer

Allan Ezra Gotlieb (February 28, 1928 – April 18, 2020) was a Canadian public servant and author who served as the Canadian Ambassador to the United States from 1981 to 1989.

== Life and career ==
Born in Winnipeg, Manitoba, Gotlieb studied at United College (now the University of Winnipeg) for two years before transferring to the University of California, Berkeley, where he received his BA. He received his MA from the University of Oxford as a Rhodes Scholar, and his LLB degree from Harvard University, where he was editor of the Harvard Law Review.

In 1957, he joined the Department of External Affairs. From 1960 to 1964, he served on Canada's Permanent Mission to the United Nations in Geneva and at the Conference on Disarmament. In 1965, he wrote the book Disarmament and International Law, a book discussing disarmament during Cold War tensions. From 1967 to 1968, he was assistant undersecretary and led the legal division at External Affairs. From 1968 to 1973, Gotlieb was deputy minister of the Department of Communications, and from 1973 to 1976 deputy minister of Manpower and Immigration. From 1977 to 1981, he was undersecretary at External Affairs.

Most notably, Gotlieb was Canadian ambassador to the United States from 1981 to 1989. His signature moment as ambassador occurred during the negotiation of the Canada–United States Free Trade Agreement, where he "played a vital role in persuading the US to adopt a position that Canada could accept."

He and his wife Sondra Gotlieb were known for their parties attended by figures in Washington. Sondra's book Washington Rollercoaster recounted the Gotliebs' years in Washington, when she also wrote a column for The Washington Post. Sondra attracted publicity on March 19, 1986, when she slapped her social secretary at an official dinner she and her husband were hosting in honour of the Canadian prime minister Brian Mulroney and US Vice-President George H. W. Bush.

After Gotlieb and his wife returned to Canada in the early 1990s, they moved to Toronto. From 1989 to 1994, Gotlieb was chairman of the Canada Council. He was also publisher of Saturday Night magazine. In 1992, Gotlieb was the Canadian representative on the arbitration panel that decided the Canada–France Maritime Boundary Case; Gotlieb dissented from the panel's decision in the case and wrote a dissent.

Gotlieb was an honorary and former fellow of Wadham College, Oxford, and was a visiting fellow at All Souls College, Oxford.

Hollinger Inc. was among his corporate directorships. He was a member of the Carlyle Group's Canadian advisory board and a member of the Trilateral Commission. He was also chairman of Sotheby's Canada, former chairman of the Ontario Heritage Foundation, and served as chairman of the board of governors of the Donner Canadian Foundation, known for its annual literary prize. He was also a senior advisor in the law office of Bennett Jones.

Gotlieb was an art collector, notably of the work of 19th-century painter James Tissot. He and his wife donated their Tissot collection to the Art Gallery of Ontario.

Gotlieb was a proponent of combining North American economic, defence, and security arrangements within a common perimeter and, in 2002, he advocated for a "grand bargain" with the US to create new trade rules and institutions. He argued "Wouldn't this 'legal integration' be superior to ad hoc responses and largely ineffective lobbying to prevent harm from Congressional protectionist sorties?"

When Ronald Reagan died in 2004, Gotlieb provided commentary for CBC Newsworld's coverage of the state funeral drawing from his experiences as Canadian ambassador to Washington when Reagan was president.

On the art of diplomacy in Washington, he said in 2009, "You have to get the power shakers, including the media, into your dining room. When an ambassador makes a phone call to a powerful congressman, he'll return the call once, but after that you have to make a personal relationship." Gotlieb published his diplomatic memoirs, The Washington Diaries, in 2006.

== Personal life ==
He married Sondra Gotlieb (née Kaufman) in December 1955. Gotlieb died on April 18, 2020, from cancer and Parkinson's disease at his home in Toronto. The Gotliebs had three children, one of whom predeceased him in 2003.

== Honours ==
Gottlieb was appointed a Companion of the Order of Canada in 1987 and received his insignia from Governor-General Jeanne Sauvé in Ottawa on May 6, 1988.

In 2014, he was made a member of the Order of Manitoba.

Gotlieb received the Government of Canada's Outstanding Achievement Award in 1983, "the highest recognition for executives at the deputy minister level in the Public Service."

On December 5, 2005, he was awarded an honorary doctorate from Concordia University.

His book "The Washington Diaries: 1981-1989" was nominated for the Writer's Trust of Canada's 2007 Shaughnessy Cohen Award for Political Writing.

== Publications ==
- Gotlieb, Allan (1967). Disarmament and International Law. OCLC 468511221.
- Gotieb, Allan; Deener, David R. (1968). Canadian Treaty Making. Toronto: Butterworth and Company. OCLC 5127135849.
- Gotlieb, Allan (1981). The Impact of Technology on the Development of Contemporary International Law. M. Nijhoff. OCLC 221433030.
- — (1987). Canada and the Economic Summits: Power and Responsibility. Centre for International Studies, University of Toronto. OCLC 882062277.
- — (1991). I'll Be with You in a Minute, Mr. Ambassador: The Education of a Canadian Diplomat in Washington. Toronto: University of Toronto Press. ISBN 0-8020-5932-5.
- — (2007). The Washington Diaries, 1981–1989. Toronto: McClelland & Stewart. ISBN 978-0-7710-3385-8. OCLC 190964915.
