= Devinuwara Electoral District =

Electoral district of Sri Lanka

Devinuwara electoral district was an electoral district of Sri Lanka between March 1960 and February 1989. The district was named after the town of Devinuwara in Matara District, Southern Province. The 1978 Constitution of Sri Lanka introduced the proportional representation electoral system for electing members of Parliament. The existing 160 mainly single-member electoral districts were replaced with 22 multi-member electoral districts. Devinuwara electoral district was replaced by the Matara multi-member electoral district at the 1989 general elections.

== Members of Parliament ==
Key

Independent SLFP UNP

Election	Member	Party	Term
1960 (March)	C. A. Dharmapala		
1960 (July)	P. P. Wickremasuriya		
1965	William de Silva		
1970	Ronnie de Mel		
1977	Ronnie de Mel		

== Elections ==
=== 1960 (March) Parliamentary General Election ===
Results of the 4th parliamentary election held on 19 March 1960:

Candidate	Party	Symbol	Votes	%
C. A. Dharmapala		Elephant	8,748	33.43
P. P. Wickremasuriya		Hand	6,720	25.68
E. K. Cyril		Cockrel	4,223	16.14
L. U. Jayasinghe		Rabbit	2,425	9.27
Aelian Nanayakkara		Star	1,743	6.66
U. H. Amarasena		Cartwheel	1,594	6.09
D. J. Mohotti		Bell	212	0.81
Charles Gandara		Umbrella	210	0.80
P. Hendavitarana		Key	94	0.36
Valid Votes			25,969	99.22
Rejected Votes			203	0.78
Total Polled			26,172	100.00
Registered Electors			34,254	
Turnout				76.41

=== 1960 (July) Parliamentary General Election ===
Results of the 5th parliamentary election held on 20 July 1960:

Candidate	Party	Symbol	Votes	%
P. P. Wickremasuriya		Hand	15,603	59.95
C. A. Dharmapala		Elephant	10,332	39.70
Valid Votes			25,935	99.65
Rejected Votes			91	0.35
Total Polled			26,026	100.00
Registered Electors			34,254	
Turnout				75.98

=== 1965 Parliamentary General Election ===
Results of the 6th parliamentary election held on 22 March 1965:

Candidate	Party	Symbol	Votes	%
William de Silva		Hand	15,295	47.87
P. P. Wickremasuriya		Sun	14,308	44.78
E. K. Cyril		Umbrella	1,342	4.20
Charlis Abayasundara		Chair	499	1.56
P. N. Bamunusinghe		Flower	305	0.95
Valid Votes			31,749	99.37
Rejected Votes			203	0.63
Total Polled			31,952	100.00
Registered Electors			40,956	
Turnout				78.02

=== 1970 Parliamentary General Election ===
Results of the 7th parliamentary election held on 27 May 1970:

Candidate	Party	Symbol	Votes	%
Ronnie de Mel		Hand	20,798	57.99
P. P. Wickremasuriya		Elephant	14,747	41.12
H. P. D. Weerasinghe		Bell	263	0.73
Valid Votes			35,808	99.86
Rejected Votes			52	0.14
Total Polled			35,860	100.00
Registered Electors			44,112	
Turnout				81.29

=== 1977 Parliamentary General Election ===
Results of the 8th parliamentary election held on 21 July 1977:

Candidate	Party	Symbol	Votes	%
Ronnie de Mel		Elephant	23,776	55.87
H. W. Dickson		Hand	14,337	33.69
Mahindapala Wijesekera		Star	4,163	9.78
S. E. Wijesuriya		Lamp	198	0.47
Valid Votes			42,474	99.81
Rejected Votes			82	0.19
Total Polled			42,556	100.00
Registered Electors			49,897	
Turnout				85.29
