= Ronnie de Mel =

Sri Lankan civil servant and politician (1925–2024)

The Honourable Ronnie de Mel
- රොනි ද මැල්

Minister of Finance
- In office 23 July 1977 – 18 January 1988
- President: William Gopallawa; J. R. Jayewardene
- Prime Minister: J. R. Jayewardene; Ranasinghe Premadasa
- Preceded by: Felix Dias Bandaranaike
- Succeeded by: M. H. M. Naina Marikar

Member of Parliament for National List
- In office 18 October 2000 – 7 February 2004

Member of Parliament for Matara District
- In office 25 August 1994 – 18 August 2000

Member of Parliament for Devinuwara
- In office 1970–1989

Personal details
- Born: 11 April 1925 British Ceylon (now Sri Lanka)
- Died: 27 February 2024 (aged 98) Colombo, Sri Lanka
- Party: Sri Lanka Freedom Party
- Other political affiliations: United National Party
- Spouse: Mallika de Mel (née Fernando)
- Children: 3 (Sunalini, Tara, Renuka)
- Education: St Thomas' College; University of Ceylon
- Occupation: Politics
- Profession: Civil Servant

Ronald Joseph Godfrey de Mel (Sinhala: රොනි ද මැල්; 11 April 1925 – 27 February 2024) was a Sri Lankan civil servant and politician. He served as the Minister of Finance under President J. R. Jayewardene's government from 1977 to 1988 and was instrumental in the establishment of the free market economy in Sri Lanka. He was also the longest serving finance minister of Sri Lanka. De Mel served as a Member of Parliament on multiple occasions, first from the Devinuwara District from 1970 to 1989, then from the Matara District from 1994 to 2000, and finally as a National list member of Parliament from 2000 to 2004. He also served as a Senior Adviser to President Mahinda Rajapaksa. Although he was a self-described socialist, de Mel has been credited with introducing capitalism and capitalist reforms to Sri Lanka's economy. He left a lasting mark on Sri Lanka's economy and political life, as recognized by national leaders at his funeral.

== Early life ==
Born to Rodget de Mel and Gladys Mendis, he studied at the St Thomas' College, Mt. Lavinia and graduated from the University of Ceylon with a BA degree having majored in English, Latin, Greek and History.

== Civil service career ==
De Mel joined the Ceylon Civil Service (CCS) in 1948, and was attached to the Department of Industries, Vavuniya Kachcheri, Puttalam Kachcheri and the Department of Social Services. In 1950, he was appointed Acting Assistant Secretary to the Ministry of Labour and Social Services and was appointed Assistant Secretary, Ministry of Labour in 1952 and was appointed Assistant at Matara to the Government Agent, Southern Province. Thereafter he served as the Assistant Secretary in the Ministry of Agriculture and Lands.

== Political career ==
Resigning from the Ceylon Administrative Service in 1964, de Mel entered politics and contested the 1965 general election as a member of the Sri Lanka Freedom Party (SLFP) from the Bibile electorate but was defeated by the United National Party (UNP) candidate Dharmadasa Banda. He then contested the 1970 general election for the SLFP from Devinuwara and was elected to parliament. He was re-elected in the 1977 general election from Devinuwara after crossing over to the UNP and was appointed Cabinet Minister of Finance.

Ronnie de Mel presided over as Minister of Finance in a most significant period of Sri Lankan history, during the presidency of J. R. Jayewardene. "If not the free market economy we would still be having scarcities, queues and we would be struggling like North Korea today. It was because of this change that everything in this country blossomed and developed." He was instrumental in raising funds for projects such as Victoria, Randenigala, Kotmale, Ports, Roads, Housing and Free Trade Zones. The minister also tried his best to curb the violent Black July riots in 1983.

Following the end of Jayewardene's second term as president, Ronnie de Mel stepped down as Finance Minister in January 1988. He left the country following the election of President Ranasinghe Premadasa, only returning following his death in 1993. He was re-elected to parliament in the 1994 general election from Matara. De Mel crossed back to the SLFP, and was reelected to Parliament in the 2000 and the 2001 general elections.

== Personal life ==
De Mel married Mallika Lakshmi de Mel née Fernando, daughter of Sir Leo Fernando. They had three children.

Ronnie de Mel died on 27 February 2024, at the age of 98. His funeral included visitation at the University of Ruhuna.

== See also ==
- 1982 Sri Lankan presidential election
- List of political families in Sri Lanka
