= Balinale =

The Bali International Film Festival, known as Balinale, is a non-profit, non-government foundation that was established in 2007. It aims to provide a global audience for Indonesian film makers, as well as to entice foreign film-makers to feature Indonesia in their films. Through this activity, several places have become shooting locations for Hollywood movies such as Eat Pray Love by Ryan Murphy, Born to Be Wild by David Lickley, Savages by Oliver Stone and Alex Cross by Rob Cohen.

== History ==
Balinale was established in 2007 by Bali Taksu Indonesia, a non-profit and non-government organization, and Bali Film Center. The festival features film-making workshops, seminars and community programs to include an open-air cinema (Layar Tancap). Balinale is affiliated with Motion Picture Association, Asia Pacific Screen Awards (Brisbane, Australia), ASEAN International Film Festival & Awards (Kuching, Malaysia), Asian Film Commissions Network and supporting American Film Showcase and Sundance Institute's Film Forward.
