= Dan Riskin =

Dan or Daniel Riskin may refer to:

- Dan Riskin (physician) (born 1971), American surgeon and healthcare entrepreneur
- Dan Riskin (science communicator) (born 1975), Canadian evolutionary biologist and television host
