= Kim Jagtiani =

Canadian television personality (born 1980)

- Born: Komila Jagtiani; 8 August 1980; Mumbai, Maharashtra, India
- Citizenship: Canada
- Education: University of Toronto Ontario Institute for Studies in Education
- Occupations: Television Personality & Counselling Psychologist
- Years active: 2000–present
- Employer(s): Garg Psychiatry Clinic (Delhi, India)
- Known for: Channel [V] Video Jockey (India) Co-Host of Daily Planet on Discovery Channel (Canada) Host of NDTV Good Times (India)

Kim Jagtiani (born Komila Jagtiani; August 8, 1980) is a Canadian television personality who has hosted multiple TV programmes for over 15 years, including regular appearances on Daily Planet for a series entitled India Unleashed. She was also a VJ (video jockey) for Channel V India, hosting Cool Stop, P.O.V. and Club V, and is considered to be a household name in India.

Born in Mumbai, India, she and her family moved to Oshawa, Ontario in Canada, and she altered her name from Komila to Kim in order to better help her adjust to Canadian society. Jagtiani won Miss India Canada in 1999, and has modelled for beauty and lifestyle magazines, including the front covers of Femina (magazine), New Woman (magazine), Seventeen and Cosmopolitan.

While vacationing in India, television station Channel V contacted her, asking if she would like to audition to be a VJ. Though she declined, her aunt made her reconsider and she went to the audition. Believing her audition went poorly, she was surprised to be contacted yet again by Channel V, who offered her a full-time position. Leaving her studies at University of Toronto, she moved to Mumbai in 2000 to begin her new job. Through her 5 year career at Channel V she learned to speak Hindi. During these years Jagtiani interviewed Bollywood Stars and international music celebrities including Celine Dion, Aaron Carter and Jennifer Love Hewitt. In 2006, Jagtiani was chosen as the lead actor for Indian beauty brands Sunsilk Shampoo and Everyuth Facewash advertising commercials.

Following this, she joined STAR One in India to host the travel program Exotica. In the well-known Indian magazine, Femina October 2007 issue, Jagtiani was named one of India’s 50 Most Beautiful Women . The word most used to describe her was "soulful." Jagtiani has also acted in several Indian plays and commercials and is trained in various forms of dance, including tap, ballet, jazz dance and Latin dance. She began training in kathak in 2003, and enjoys attending Kathak performances. On 2 August 2007, Discovery Channel announced Jagtiani as the new co-host of Daily Planet, a daily science television show on Discovery Canada, starting 4 September 2007. She had co-hosted an India theme week for the programme in the spring of 2007. She left Daily Planet in September 2008, and returned to India where she hosted travel documentaries and travel shows for Discovery Channel India and NDTV Good Times.

She was one of 50 semi-finalists for The Best Job In The World, a competition created by Tourism Queensland to promote the Great Barrier Reef as a tourism destination.

In 2011, Jagtiani performed a cameo in the Bollywood hit film Desi Boyz, directed by Rohit Dhawan, co-starring Akshay Kumar and John Abraham.

In 2021, she completed her Masters in Counselling Psychology from the Ontario Institute for Studies in Education, Canada.

Preceded by Natasha Stillwell	Daily Planet anchor 2007 – 2008 coanchor Jay Ingram	Succeeded by Ziya Tong
