= Quirks & Quarks =

CBC Radio One science news program

- Other names: Quirks
- Genre: Science news
- Running time: ca. 54 min.
- Country of origin: Canada
- Language: English
- Home station: CBC Radio One
- Hosted by: Bob McDonald
- Produced by: Rosie Fernandez, Sonya Buyting, Amanda Buckiewicz
- Executive producers: Anita Gordon; Ira Basen; Ann Stewart; Jim Handman; Nick McCabe-Lokos; Jim Lebans; Hannah Hoag (current)
- Recording studio: Toronto, Ontario
- Original release: October 8, 1975 – present
- Audio format: Monophonic
- Website: www.cbc.ca/quirks
- Podcast: Podcast

Quirks & Quarks is a Canadian science news program, heard over CBC Radio One of the Canadian Broadcasting Corporation (CBC). Created by CBC Producer Diana Filer and airing since October 8, 1975, Quirks & Quarks is consistently rated among the most popular CBC programs, attracting over 800,000 listeners each Saturday from 12:06 to 13:00. The show is also heard on Sirius Satellite Radio and some American public radio stations. The show consists of several segments each week, most of which involve the host interviewing a scientist about a recent discovery or publication, combined with in-depth documentaries; however, from time to time the show does a special "Question Show" episode, during which the format consists of scientists answering questions submitted by listeners.

Quirks & Quarks has offered listeners Internet audio streams and MP3 downloads on its web page since 1993. The MP3 audio files have been archived on the program web site, going back to Sept. 2006. In 2005, Quirks became the first major CBC show available as a podcast. Since the program began, it has won more than 80 national and international journalism awards, including the prestigious Walter Sullivan Award (twice) and the Science Writing Award from the American Institute of Physics (twice).

In the mid-2000s, the CBC began repackaging episodes of Quirks & Quarks into podcast segments. On November 28, 2006, the Quirks & Quarks podcast was one of the top 10 downloads on the iTunes podcast chart.

== Hosts ==
- 1975–1979: David Suzuki
- 1979–1991: Jay Ingram
- 1992: David Mowbray
- 1992–present: Bob McDonald

Suzuki went on to host CBC Television's The Nature of Things. Ingram left to become founding host of Discovery Channel Canada's nightly science-news program @discovery.ca. Mowbray hosted for four months and then left to make documentary films about science in international development. McDonald came to Quirks from having hosted CBC Television's children's science program Wonderstruck.
