= Riskin =

Riskin is a surname. Notable people with the name include:

- Carl Riskin, American economist
- Dan Riskin (physician) (born 1971), American surgeon and healthcare entrepreneur
- Dan Riskin (science communicator) (born 1975), Canadian evolutionary biologist and television host
- Eve Riskin, American electrical engineer and academic administrator
- Everett Riskin (1895–1982), American film producer
- Jessica Riskin (born 1967), American historian of science
- Neta Riskin (born 1976), Israeli actress
- Robert Riskin (1897–1955), American screenwriter
- Shlomo Riskin (born 1940), American rabbi
