= Natasha Stillwell =

English television reporter and producer

- Occupation(s): Television host, producer

Natasha Stillwell is an English television reporter and producer, known in Canada for the television show Daily Planet, on Discovery Channel Canada and in Northern and Central Scotland for her reporting role on STV’s The Five Thirty Show.

Originally from Hertfordshire, Natasha grew up in Edinburgh, she was a weather girl on the city’s now defunct LIVE! station. Following this, Natasha worked for the independent television production company Tern Television where she hosted shows for the BBC and Channel 4 before moving to Canada in September 2002 to join Jay Ingram on Discovery Canada’s science and technology show.

Her appearance on Daily Planet was occasionally parodied on CBC comedy show This Hour Has 22 Minutes by comedian and impressionist Gavin Crawford. Stillwell’s final appearance was 2 February 2007.

She returned to Scotland, joining STV for the launch of their features magazine programme The Five Thirty Show as one of the show’s reporters from 28 January 2008 until the programme was axed on 15 May 2009. Stillwell then became a producer for The Five Thirty Show’s successor, The Hour.

She has also presented her own video blog, Stillwell Science, on YouTube, and written articles on science for The Times newspaper.

In 2011, Stillwell joined Twig, a company that makes educational films and resources. She served in a number of roles before the company was acquired by Imagine Learning in 2022, and now serves as president of Imagine Learning Studios, UK.

Preceded by Gill Deacon	Daily Planet/@discovery.ca anchor' 2002 – 2007 co-anchor Jay Ingram	Succeeded by Kim Jagtiani
