= Catherine Mary Stewart =

Canadian actress (born 1959)

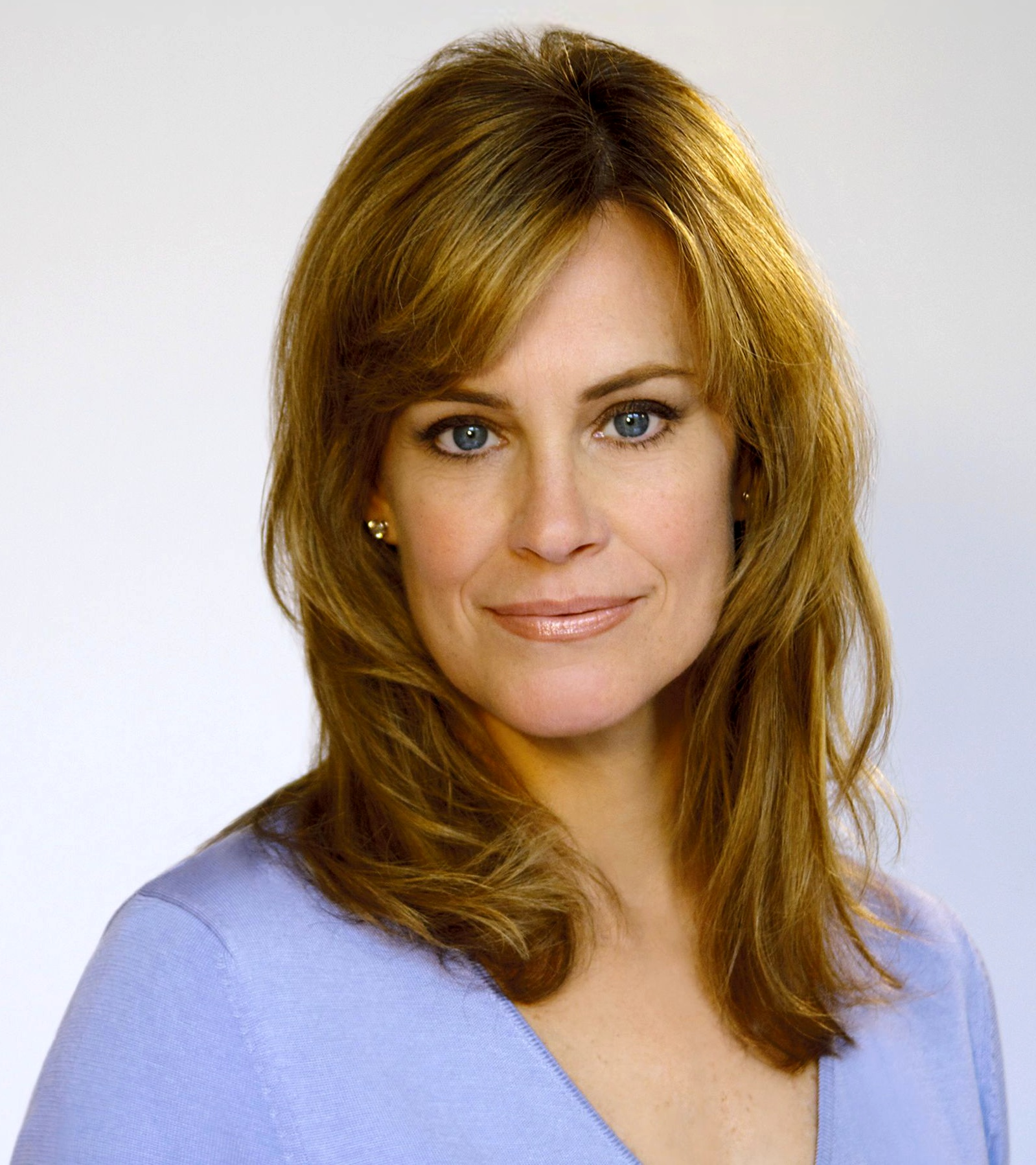
- Stewart in 2011
- Born: Catherine Mary Nursall; 22 April 1959 (age 67); Edmonton, Alberta, Canada
- Occupation: Actress
- Years active: 1980–present
- Spouses: John Findlater (m. 1983; div. 1985) Richard Allerton (m. 1992)
- Children: 2
- Website: www.catherinemarystewart.com

Catherine Mary Stewart (née Catherine Nursall; born 22 April 1959) is a Canadian actress. Her film roles include The Apple, Night of the Comet, The Last Starfighter and Weekend at Bernie's. She was also the original Kayla Brady in Days of Our Lives.

== Early life ==
Stewart was born on 22 April 1959, in Edmonton, Alberta, the daughter of Mary (Stewart) and John Ralph Nursall. Her parents taught at the University of Alberta, her mother a physiology teaching assistant and her father a biology professor. Stewart attended Strathcona Composite High School. She first took jazz dance lessons, and moved to London after high school to study dance and general performing arts, and where she passed the audition for her first movie, The Apple.

== Career ==
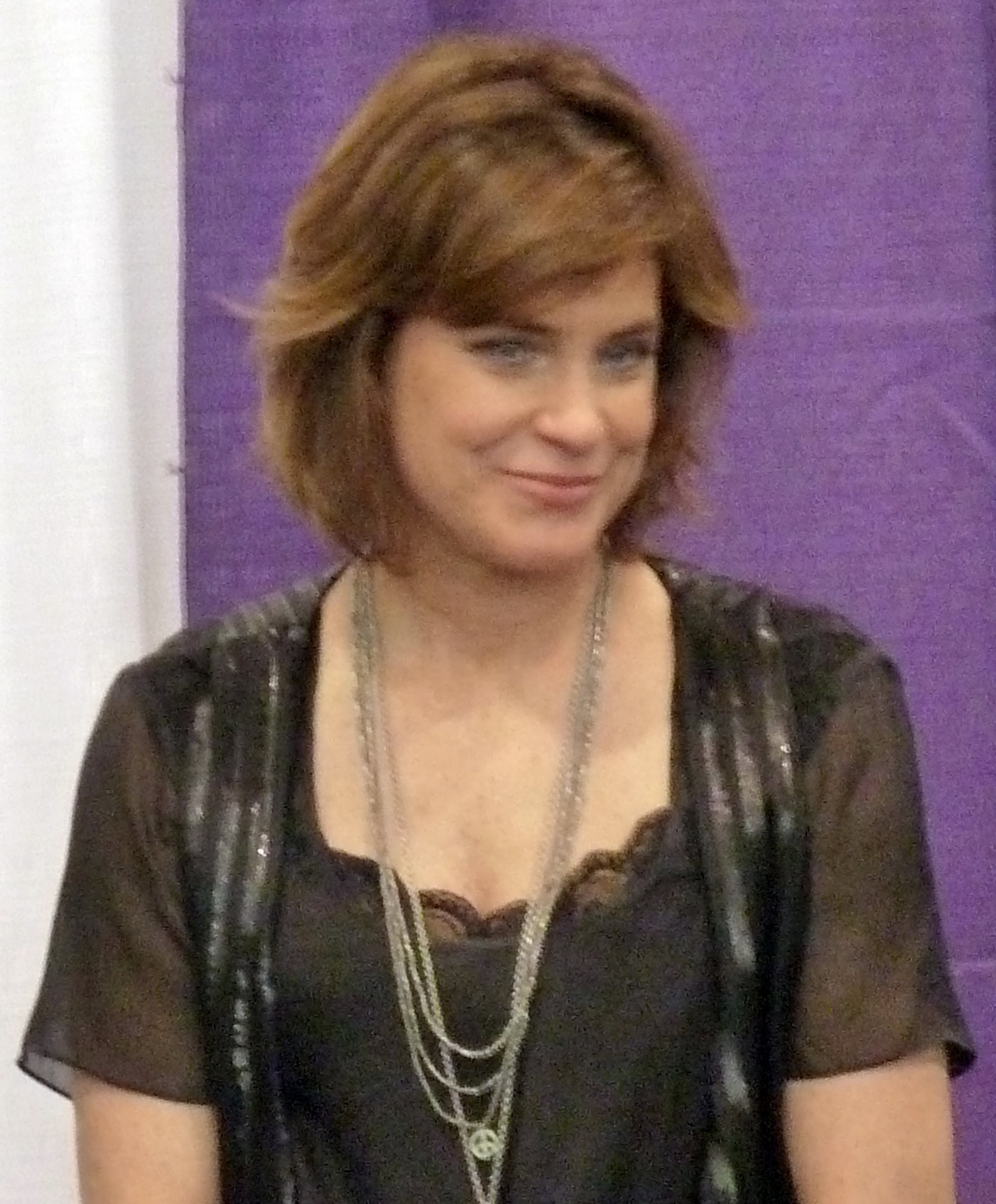
Stewart in 2012

In 1980, Stewart landed a role in The Apple, a musical science fiction cult film. During the production of The Apple, the director Menahem Golan took issue with her original name Mary Nursall and insisted she change it, which she did using her mother's maiden name.

After moving to Los Angeles, she obtained a role on the soap opera Days of Our Lives, playing the original Kayla Brady from January 1982 to December 1983. She also auditioned for projects like Death of a Centerfold: The Dorothy Stratten Story, against Jamie Lee Curtis. In 1984, she starred in two science fiction feature films, The Last Starfighter as Maggie Gordon and Night of the Comet as Regina Belmont. She later played a leading role in the teen comedy Mischief.

In the mid-1980s, Stewart appeared in two miniseries: Hollywood Wives (1985) and Sins (1986), where she played the younger version of Joan Collins's character. She made guest appearances on television series such as Knight Rider, Hotel, Alfred Hitchcock Presents and The Outer Limits. She starred in several made-for-TV movies such as Murder by the Book (1987), Passion and Paradise (1989), Perfect Harmony (1991) and Ordeal in the Arctic (1993). In 1989, she appeared as Gwen Saunders in the comedy film Weekend at Bernie's. She, too, had a small role on The A-Team, season 2 episode titled Steel.

Beginning in the mid-1990s, she scaled back her appearances while raising her family. After her children had grown, she again started appearing in television and film roles, and expressed an interest in directing. In 2010, she appeared in the film A Christmas Snow. In 2016, she directed the short movie A Walk to Remember. She starred in the Hallmark holidays movies Rock N' Roll Christmas in 2019 and A Christmas Comeback in 2020.

== Personal life ==
Stewart is the sister of Alan Nursall, a scientist and media personality who reports on science news for the Canadian TV series Daily Planet and the Discovery Channel. Another brother, John Nursall, is a freelance writer and TV/film documentary director and producer.

Stewart was married to actor John Findlater in 1983 and divorced in 1985. She married Richard Allerton in 1992, with whom she has a daughter and a son. The family lived in Brooklyn, New York, as of 2013.

== Filmography ==
=== Film ===
Year	Title	Role	Notes
1980	Powderheads	Belinda	
1980	The Apple	Bibi	
1981	Nighthawks	Sales Girl in London	
1982	The Beach Girls	The Surfer Girl	
1984	The Last Starfighter	Maggie Gordon	
1984	Night of the Comet	Regina Belmont	
1984	Terror in the Aisles	Herself	Documentary film
1985	Mischief	Bunny Miller	
1987	Scenes from the Goldmine	Debi DiAngelo	
1987	Dudes	Jessie	
1987	Nightflyers	Miranda Dorlac	
1988	World Gone Wild	Angie	
1989	Riding the Edge	Maggie Cole	
1989	Weekend at Bernie's	Gwen Saunders	
1991	The Psychic	Laurel	
1991	Cafe Romeo	Lia	
1994	Samurai Cowboy	Jessie Collins	
1995	Number One Fan	Holly Newman	
1995	Out of Annie's Past	Annie Carver	Direct-to-video
1999	Dead Silent	Julia Kerbridge	
2000	Reaper	Sonya Lehrman	
2007	The Girl Next Door	Mrs. Moran	
2007	The Attic	Kim Callan	Direct-to-video
2010	Perry St	Elaine	Short film
2010	Rising Stars	Ms. Cage	
2010	A Christmas Snow	Kathleen	Direct-to-video
2013	AmeriQua	Mrs. Edwards	
2017	Imitation Girl	Mrs. Phan	

=== Television ===
Year	Title	Role	Notes
1982	Mr. Merlin	Daisy Willis	Episode: "Everything's Coming Up Daisies"
1982–1983	Days of Our Lives	Kayla Brady	150 episodes
1983	Knight Rider	Lisa Martinson	Episode: "Brother's Keeper"
1983	A Killer in the Family	Carol	TV movie
1984	With Intent to Kill	Lisa Nolen	TV movie
1985	Hotel	Lynn Valli	Episode: "Promises"
1985	Hollywood Wives	Angel Hudson	Miniseries, 3 episodes
1985	Midas Valley	Betsy	TV movie
1986	Sins	Young Helene Junot	Miniseries, 3 episodes
1986	Annihilator	Angela Taylor	TV movie
1987	Murder by the Book	Marissa	TV movie
1987	Alfred Hitchcock Presents	Rachel Jenkins	Episode: "Tragedy Tonight"
1989	Passion and Paradise	Nancy Oakes	TV movie
1990	Project: Tinman	Naomi	TV pilot
1990	Follow Your Heart	Katy	TV movie
1991	Perfect Harmony	Miss Hobbs	TV movie
1992	Hearts Are Wild	Kyle Hubbard	7 episodes
1992	The Witches of Eastwick	Sukie Ridgemont	TV movie
1993	Ordeal in the Arctic	Captain Wilma De Groot	TV movie
1993	The Sea Wolf	Flaxen Brewster	TV movie
1996	The Outer Limits	Joanne Sharp	Episode: "Unnatural Selection"
2001	The Outer Limits	Brooke Miller	Episode: "Family Values"
2002	Guiding Light	Naomi	2 episodes
2007	My Daughter's Secret	Detective Marrin	TV movie
2007	Sharpshooter	Amy	TV movie
2008	Dead at 17	Holly	TV movie
2008	Generation Gap	Veronica Statlan	TV movie
2009	My Neighbor's Secret	Detective Neal	TV movie
2010	Class	Julia Sheffield	TV movie
2012	Ghoul	Mrs. Elizabeth Graco	TV movie
2013	The Husband She Met Online	Detective Eve Millstrom	TV movie
2019	Rock N' Roll Christmas	Bonnie Rose	TV movie
2021	Deck the Heart	Felicia Johnson	TV movie
2023	Law & Order	Victoria Chandler	Episode: "Open Wounds"
