= David Pearson (geologist) =

British-Canadian geologist

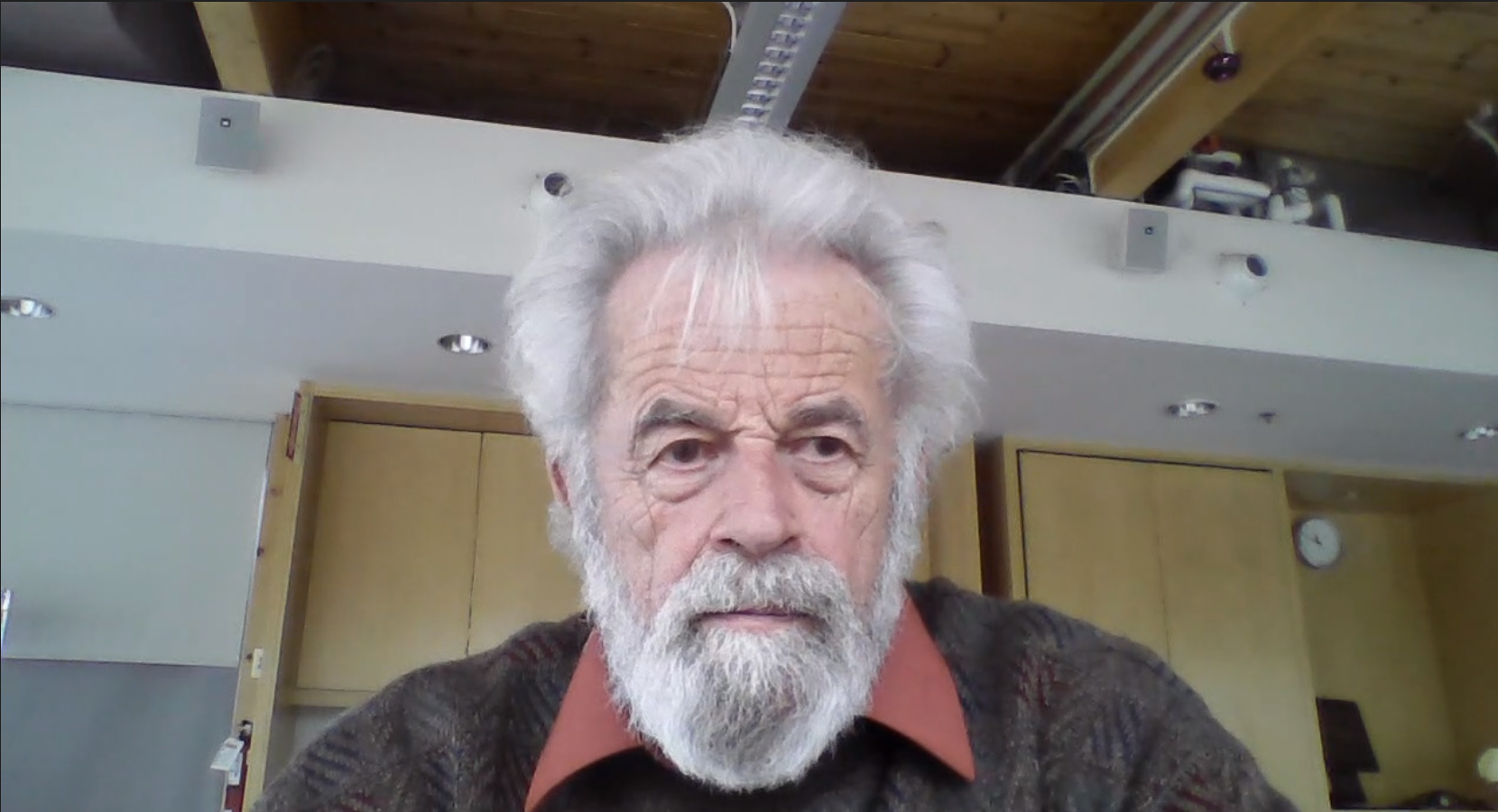
David Pearson in May 2022

David Pearson (born 1942) is a British-born Canadian scientist, academic and television personality. He is a professor of earth sciences and science communication at Laurentian University in Sudbury, Ontario.

== Education ==
Pearson was educated at the University of Durham, where he took a B.Sc. degree in geology in 1963, then at Imperial College, London, graduating Ph.D. and D.I.C. in 1967.

== Career ==
Joining the teaching staff of Laurentian University in 1969, Pearson was the founding director of Science North, the city's interactive science museum, from 1980 to 1986. He retained an advisory position with Science North after 1986, and returned as science director in 2007 following the departure of Alan Nursall from the institution. He now serves as Senior Science Advisor to Science North and as Laurentian University's co-director of its Science Communication program.

Pearson also hosted science-oriented television programming, including TVOntario's Understanding the Earth and MCTV's syndicated The World Around Us, in the 1980s. He received the Ward Neale Medal from the Geological Association of Canada for promotion of the earth sciences in 2001, and the McNeil Medal for science communication from the Royal Society of Canada in 2003.

Pearson was the co-chair of the 2009 Ontario Expert Panel on Climate Change Adaptation.

== Honours ==
In 2016, he was made a member of the Order of Ontario.
