= Science North =

Science centre in Sudbury, Canada

- Science Nord

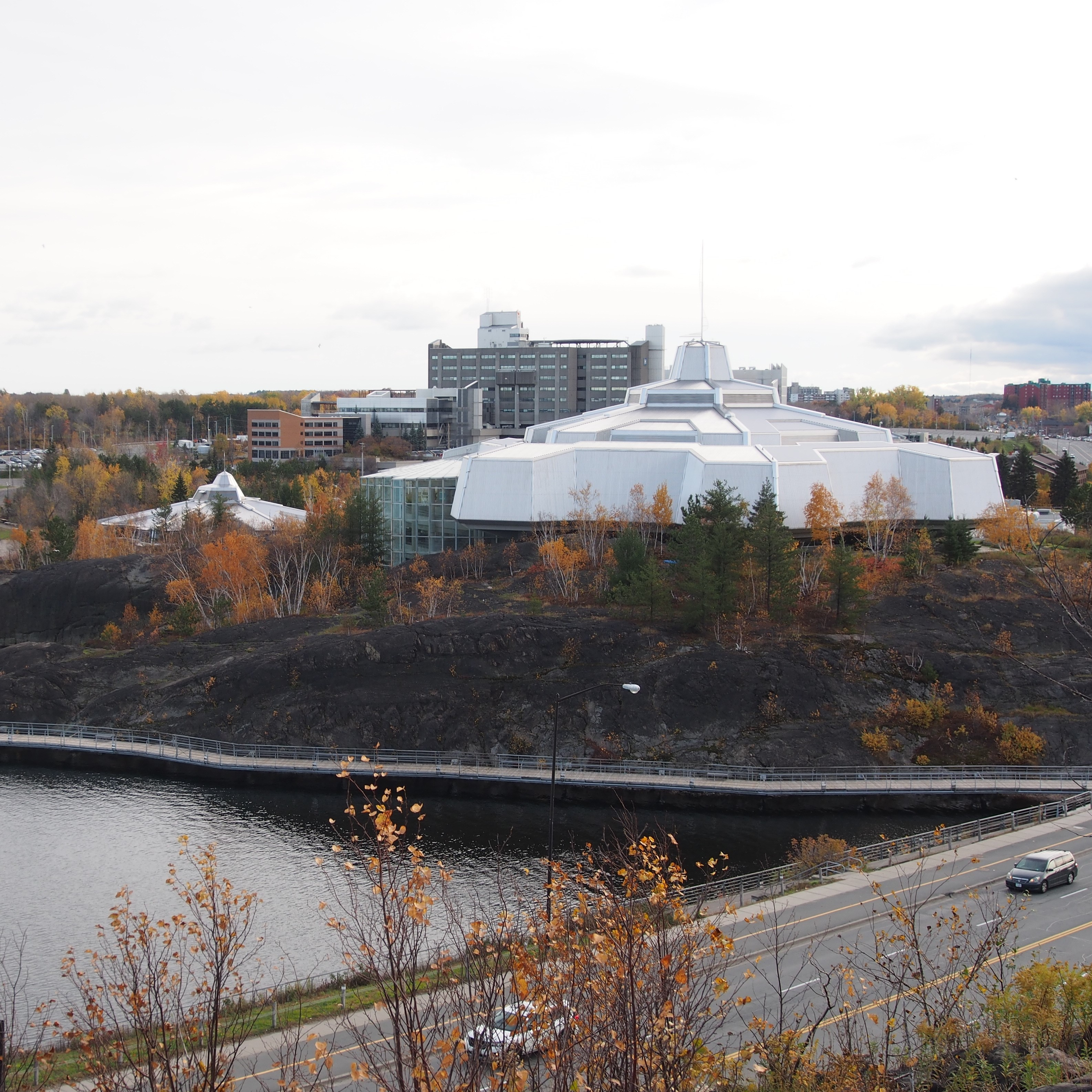
- Science North in 2022
- Established: June 19, 1984
- Location: 100 Ramsey Lake Road; Sudbury, Ontario; P3E 5S9
- Coordinates: 46°28′14″N 80°59′46″W
- Type: Science centre
- Accreditation: Canada's Accredited Zoos and Aquariums
- CEO: Ashley Larose
- Architects: Moriyama & Teshima; Townend, Stefura, Baleshta and Nicholls
- Owner: Government of Ontario
- Website: sciencenorth.ca

Science North (French: Science Nord) is a science museum in Greater Sudbury, Ontario, Canada. It contains object theatres, an IMAX theatre, a planetarium, and exhibition halls across four levels with a variety of hands-on permanent exhibits focused on technology, ecology, geology and the geography of Northern Ontario.

== History ==
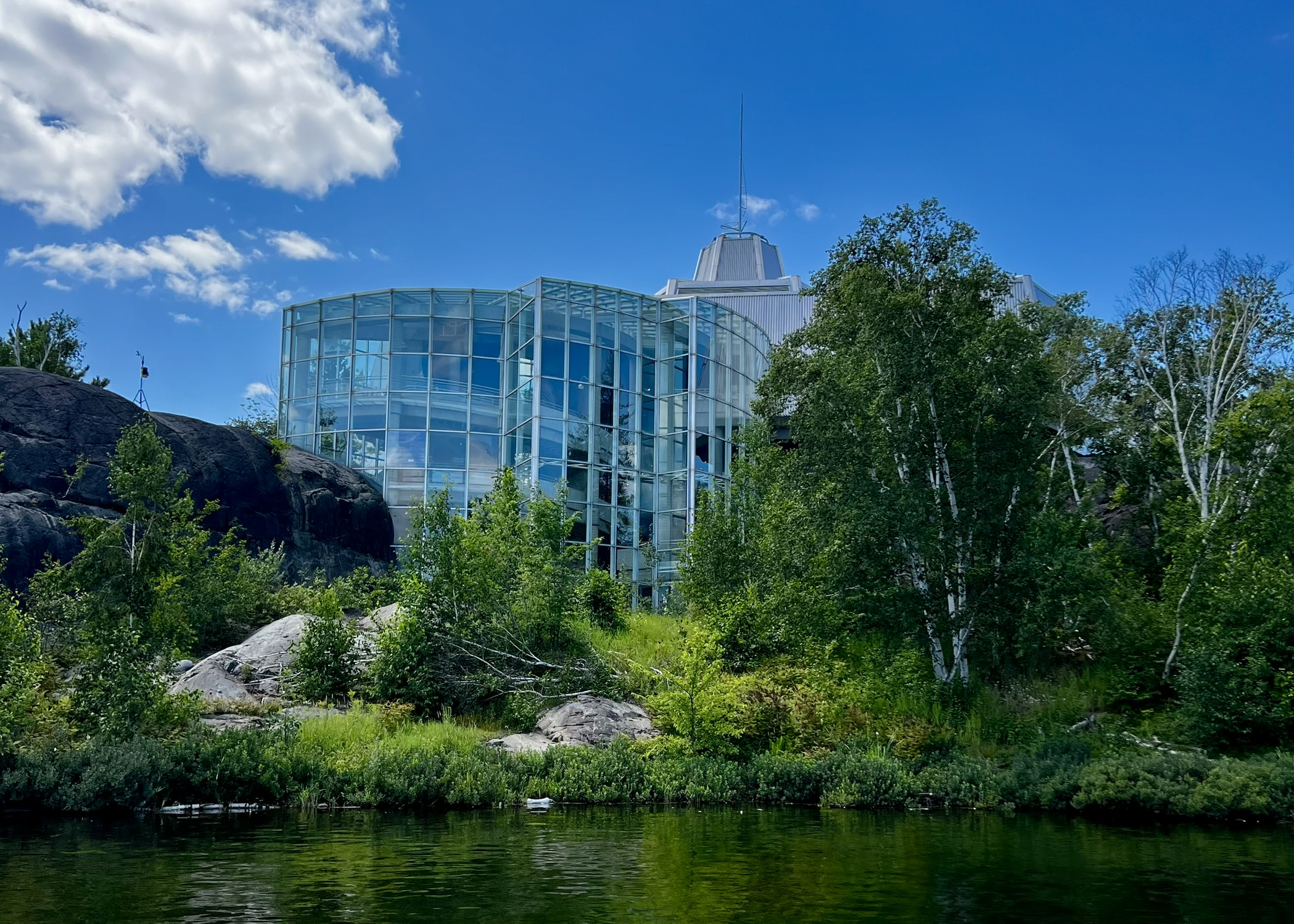
Science North from Ramsey Lake

The plans for what was to become Science North were unveiled in 1980, and the centre opened in 1984. The plans were designed by architect Raymond Moriyama in association with Townend, Stefura, Baleshta and Nicholls. It received the Governor General’s Medal for Architecture in 1986. Science North opened on June 19, 1984 with an official opening ceremony held in October that was presided by Elizabeth II during the 1984 royal tour of Canada.

== Exhibits and attractions ==
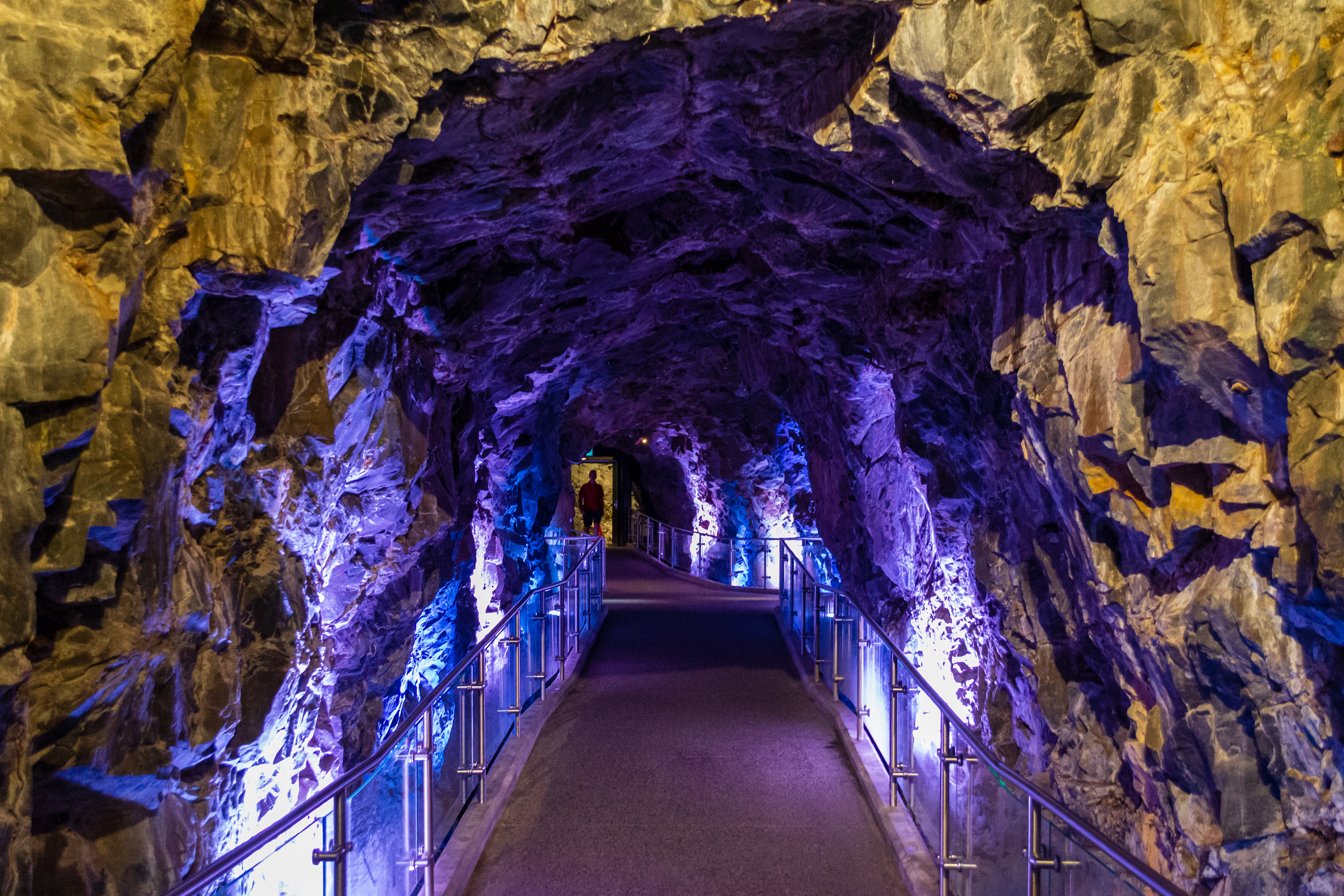
The rock tunnel connecting the two buildings

Science North consists of two snowflake-shaped buildings on the southwestern shore of Ramsey Lake. The buildings are connected by a rock tunnel, which passes through a geological fault. This fault line was not known to be under the complex when the site was originally selected, and was only discovered during construction. Inside the main starwell, a 20-metre fin whale skeleton, recovered from Anticosti Island, hangs from the ceiling.

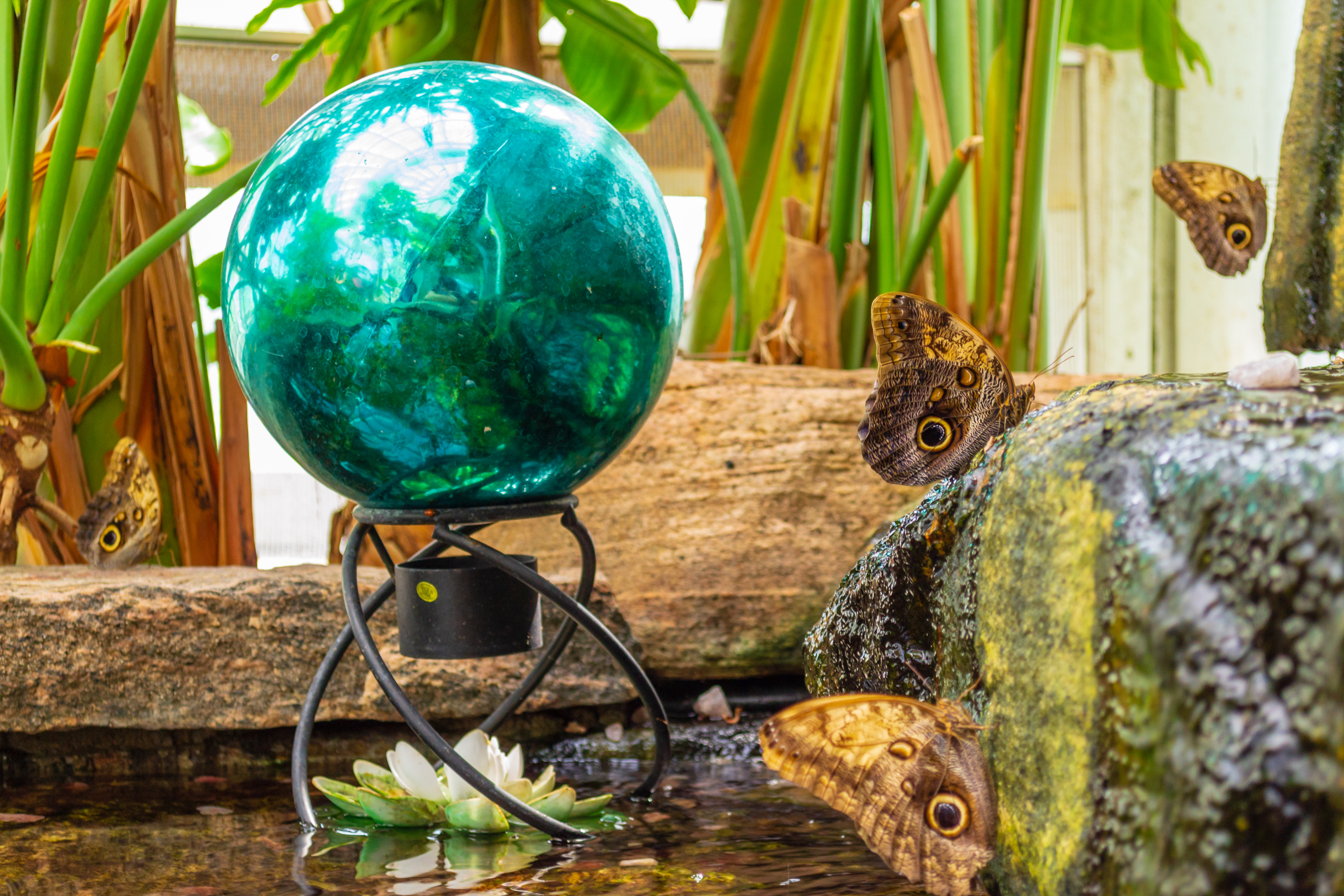
The F. Jean MacLeod Butterfly Gallery

The F. Jean MacLeod Butterfly Gallery is located on the second level. The gallery is a glass-enclosed butterfly house containing approximately 400 butterflies from 30 different tropical species. The third level covers the ecosystems of Northern Ontario, with displays covering regional ecology. The exhibits include aquariums and enclosures with frogs, turtles, snakes, porcupines and flying squirrels. The third level previously housed beavers as 'animal ambassadors', including Drifter from 2004 until 2020 and Kash from 2016 until 2023. The fourth level covers technology, housing displays on astronomy and the human body.

=== Outdoors ===
The Jim Gordon Boardwalk connects Science North to Bell Park along the western shore of the Ramsey Lake. The William Ramsey cruise boat departs from the dock at the boardwalk, and runs from June to September. Formerly called the Cortina, it was renamed the William Ramsey in 2014 for the surveyor for whom the lake was named.

== Auditoriums ==
Science North houses an IMAX Theatre with laser projection, opened in 1994. The theatre was converted to 3D in 2009. Within the rock tunnel is the Vale Cavern auditorium. The auditorium is used for temporary exhibits, press conferences, film screenings, and other events. In June 2009, an 8-metre dome planetarium with 36 seats was installed. The Discovery theatre, located in the centre of the third and fourth levels, hosts live science shows cover topics ranging from fire to sound. The Climate Action Show, narrated by Rick Mercer, opened in 2003 and was updated in 2022.

== Education ==
Science North employs a team of science communicators known as 'Blue Coats' for their blue lab coat uniforms. Blue Coats provide interpretive and educational experiences for visitors, present shows at the Discovery Theatre, and lead events and tours.

Science North's former science director, Alan Nursall, later became a correspondent for the Canadian science newsmagazine series Daily Planet, which aired on Discovery Channel and CTV. The institution's first science director, David Pearson, returned to the position in 2007. He was succeeded by Jennifer Pink from 2008 to 2017, and Julie Moskalyk from 2017 to 2024.

The Science North Production Team produces object theatres, multi-media presentations and large format film productions for science museums and educational facilities around North America. The team's productions include the 2023 documentary film Jane Goodall: Reasons for Hope, which won a Canadian Screen Award for sustainable production at the 12th Canadian Screen Awards in 2024.

Science North has worked with Laurentian University on scientific and environmental research, including as a partner in the university's graduate program in science communication. Science North runs science education day camps for children throughout the year in several Northern communities covering a wide range of scientific topics.

During the COVID-19 pandemic, Science North engaged in several programs to promote COVID-19 vaccines to youth, families and young adults. The museum received a $50,000 CAD grant in July 2021 from the Government of Canada for a project titled “Promoting Vaccine Confidence across Northern Ontario.” It was awarded through a grant program called “Encouraging Vaccine Confidence in Canada” jointly administered by the Canadian Institutes of Health Research (CIHR), Natural Sciences and Engineering Research Council (NSERC) and the Social Sciences and Humanities Research Council (SSHRC). Science North also received a $500,000 grant from the Public Health Agency of Canada's Immunization Partnership Fund to target vaccine hesitant individuals through virtual and in-person activities including podcasts, webinars, digital content and events, museum exhibits and workshops.

== Expansion ==
Science North has announced plans to build a satellite facility in Thunder Bay, although it was announced in 2026 that the initial intent to begin construction in early 2027 will be delayed.

== Honours ==
In 2026, Science North was named to the Ontario Association of Architects' annual Queen's Park Picks, highlighting architecturally significant buildings in the province.

== See also ==
- List of science centres
