= Science North Production Team =

The Science North Production Team is a production division of Science North in Sudbury, Ontario, Canada, which produces object theatres, multimedia presentations and large format film productions for science museums and educational facilities around North America.

An agency of the provincial government of Ontario, Science North is overseen by the provincial Ministry of Culture.

Members of the team include Rob Gagne, John Alden Milne, Andrea Martin, Amy Wilson, Richard Wildeman, Tim Marshall Jr. and David Lickley.

== Notable productions ==
| Year | Production | Client | Awards |
|---|---|---|---|
| 2006 | Aztec Theatre | Aztec on the River | TEA's Thea Award Winner |
| 2006 | Extinction | Canadian Museum of Nature | |
| 2007 | Lodge Life | City of Williams Lake, BC | |
| 2007 | Concorde Experience | Barbados Concorde Museum-Grantley Adams | |
| 2007 | Ends of the Earth | International Multi-Media Exhibit | |
| 2008 | Water Works | International Multi-Media Exhibit | |
| 2008 | Body Trek | Denver Museum of Nature and Science | |
| 2008 | Xstrata: Rags to Riches | Dynamic Earth | |
| 2008 | Ground Rules | Caterpillar Inc. | |
| 2009 | Migration Theatre | Philadelphia Zoo | |
| 2009 | Creatures of the Abyss | International Multi-Media Exhibit | |
| 2023 | Jane Goodall: Reasons for Hope | | Canadian Screen Music Award, Best Original Score for a Short Film : Amin Bhatia; Canadian Screen Award, Special Award for Sustainable Production |
