= Dan Riskin (science communicator) =

Canadian biologist

Daniel K. Riskin
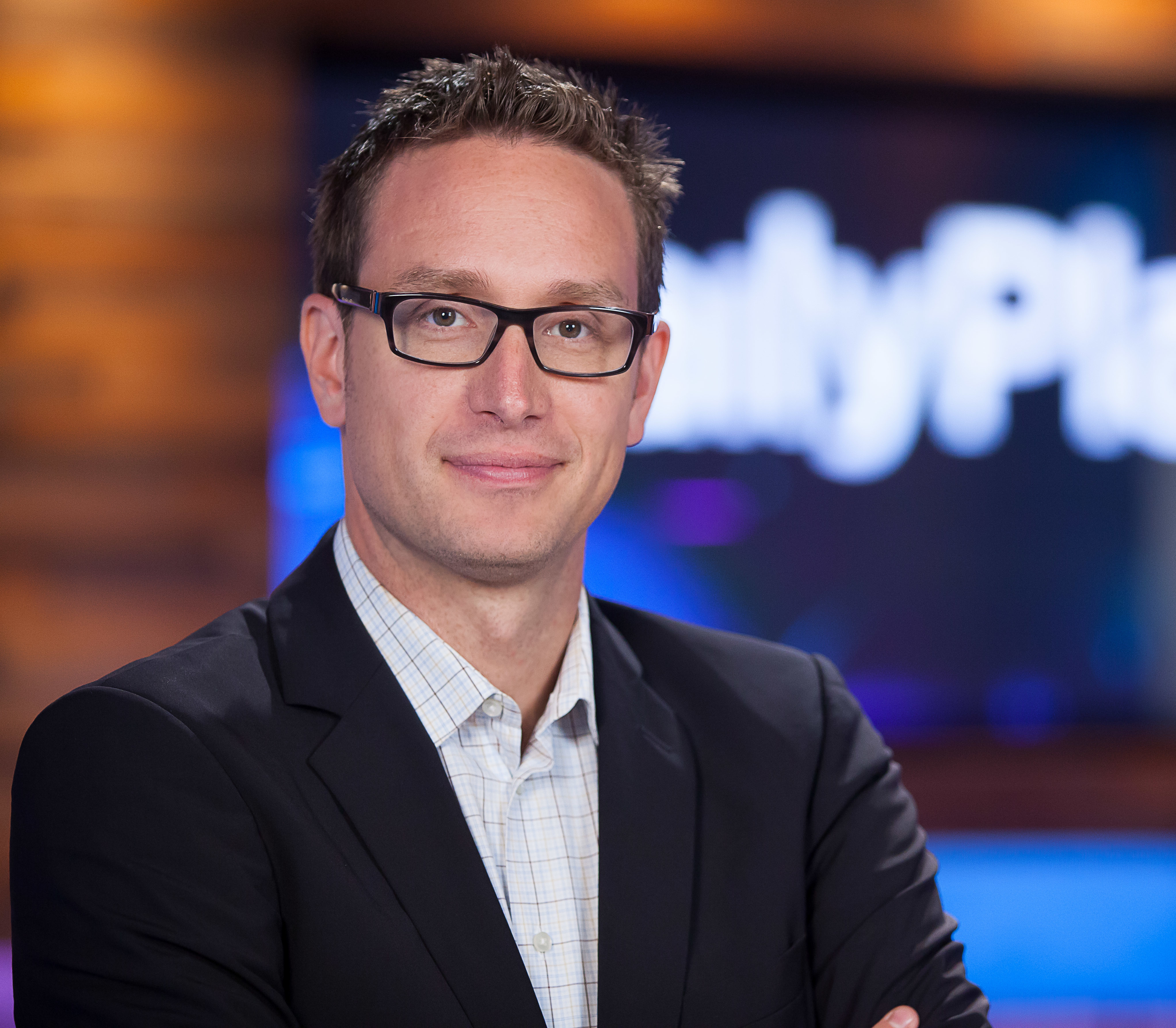
- Riskin in 2012
- Born: January 1, 1975 (age 51); Edmonton, Alberta, Canada
- Education: University of Alberta; York University; Cornell University
- Occupations: Evolutionary Biologist, television Personality, producer
- Known for: Hosting Daily Planet
- Spouse: Shelby Riskin
- Children: 3
- Website: noctilio.com

Daniel K. Riskin (born January 1, 1975) is a Canadian evolutionary biologist, television personality and producer. He hosted the Canadian television series Daily Planet.

== Early life and education ==
He was born and raised in Edmonton, Alberta and currently lives in Toronto, Ontario. He received a BSc in zoology from the University of Alberta, an MSc in biology from York University, and a PhD in zoology from Cornell University. He also completed post-doctoral studies at Boston University and Brown University.

== Career ==
=== Science ===
During high school, Riskin read a book called Just Bats by M. Brock Fenton. The book inspired him, so he contacted Fenton, then a professor at York University, and told him that he would like to meet him. Fenton invited him to come out to join his lab. Within a few months, Riskin was catching bats in Costa Rica.

Riskin has studied bats in Costa Rica, United States, Canada, Anguilla, France, Israel, Australia, New Zealand, Trinidad, Ecuador, South Africa and Madagascar and has filmed in United States, Morocco, England, China and Germany. He has authored or co-authored more than 20 papers.

After publishing a scientific paper about running vampire bats in 2005, Riskin was interviewed on Discovery Canada's flagship daily science show, Daily Planet, by then-host Natasha Stillwell. Years later, Riskin joined the show as the replacement for long-time host Jay Ingram.

=== Television ===
Riskin appears on the Animal Planet series Monsters Inside Me, which is about parasites, as an expert.

To promote that show, Riskin has appeared on The Dr. Oz Show (2009), The Tonight Show with Jay Leno (2010), and several times on The Late Late Show with Craig Ferguson (2010–2014). Riskin has also appeared on the shows Evolve (2008) and Bedbug Apocalypse (2011). In 2010, Riskin became the co-host of Daily Planet, on Discovery Channel Canada with Ziya Tong.

Although Riskin now works full-time in television, he still dabbles in bat research. On one of his first segments on Daily Planet, he filmed in China to look for the fishing bat which catches fish with its feet.

=== Writing ===
Riskin's first book, Mother Nature is Trying to Kill You: A Lively Tour Through the Dark Side of the Natural World, was published by Touchstone Books on March 4, 2014. Riskin also published a children's book in 2022 titled, "Fiona the Fruit Bat" about a short-tailed fruit bat who is afraid of the dark but has to make a leap of faith to take her first flight. Beautifully illustrated by Rachel Qiuqi.

== Television appearances ==
- Evolve – Expert (2008)
- Monsters Inside Me – Expert (2009–2017, 2026-present)
- Bedbug Apocalypse – Expert (2011)
- Human Nature – Host (2012)
- Daily Planet – Co-Host (2011–2018)
- Battle of the Alphas - Expert (2021-2022)
- Mysteries From Above (2022–present)

== Podcast Host ==
- Inside the Breakthrough - How Science Comes to Life - Host (2021-2022)

Sponsored by Canadian company SciMar, the podcast captivatingly details stories about science and how their lessons can be applied to scientific breakthroughs today. All episodes conclude with how the Canadian company SciMar utilizes these themes to push forward research into type 2 diabetes through shifting the paradigm from investigating the pancreas to the liver through the protein hepatilin (or HISS- Hepatic insulin sensitizing substance).
