= Wildeman =

Wildeman may refer to:

- Dick Wildeman, candidate in the Hamilton, Ontario municipal election, 2003
- Émile Auguste Joseph De Wildeman (1866–1947), Belgian botanist
- Richard Wildeman, computer animator, part of the award-winning Science North Production Team
- Wildeman River, river in southern Papua, Indonesia

== See also ==
- Waldman
- Wild Man
- Wildemann
- Wildman (disambiguation)
- Wildmen
- Wildmon
