= Rae Hull =

Canadian television producer

Rae Hull is a Canadian new media and television producer who began her career as a journalist and producer.

== Biography ==
She was born in Edmonton, Alberta and was later based in Vancouver, British Columbia.

Hull was an independent producer as well as a journalist for both CBC and the CTV Television Network. As head of program development for CBC Television in Vancouver she was the executive in charge of production for The Broadcast Tapes of Dr. Peter (1993) which was nominated for an Academy Award.

She was the regional director for CBC in Vancouver starting in 1998, and was shortly after given additional responsibilities as a senior director of network programming. In this role, at the invitation of senior CBC management in 2001 who wanted a new program that nurtured up and coming talent, Hull created the concept for ZeD. The TV-web project showcased user-generated content on network television and was nominated for an International Emmy. This was before the days of YouTube, making CBC Television one of the first broadcasters in the world to embrace user generated content.

As regional director, she was also credited with ensuring more CBC programming was made in Vancouver, including the cancelled national news program. In 2006 she lost her job as Regional Director amidst general plans for revising the CBC staff. She was quoted by the media as saying "Sometimes you pick the moment, and sometimes it picks you."

In the 2005 labour dispute, as part of the management staff left to run the network, her assigned duties were as temporary anchor during the abbreviated national newscasts.

In May 2007, Hull was appointed director of media programming and partnerships for the Cultural Olympiad of the 2010 Vancouver Olympics and 2010 Winter Paralympics. Hull developed a digital programming strategy for the Cultural Olympiad, creating a concept and series of programs that extended the cultural program of the Olympics for the first time ever into the digital sphere. Her title was changed to creative director CODE. Following the 2010 Olympics, the Cultural Olympiad and Canada CODE was the focus of an article in Mashable: "The Big Winner of Social Media for Vancouver 2010 Winter Olympics".

Her honours have included being named as one of 130 notable British Columbians by the Vancouver Sun in 2001. She also was awarded the Woman of the Year Spotlight in 2001 by Vancouver Women in Film & Video. Between 2007 and 2008, Hull was appointed as an advisor for recipients of the Action Canada Fellowships, and served on the boards of the Vancouver International Film Festival, the Contemporary Art Gallery (Vancouver), and the National Board of Canadian Women in Communications.
