= Page Fletcher =

Canadian actor

- Born: Charles Page Fletcher; Bass River, Nova Scotia, Canada
- Occupation: Actor
- Years active: 1982-2002

Charles Page Fletcher is a Canadian retired actor who has starred in films and on television. He is best known for his role on the 1980s hit HBO TV series The Hitchhiker as the main title character from 1984–1990 and for playing RoboCop in the TV mini series RoboCop: Prime Directives.

== Biography ==
The son of Ron and Peggy (née Fulton), Fletcher was born and grew up in Bass River, Nova Scotia. His first feature film was in the 1982 horror movie Humongous as Tom Rice. His other films include American Nightmare (1983), Martha, Ruth, & Edie (1988), and Friends, Lovers, & Lunatics (1989).

Page starred in the 2000 TV mini series RoboCop: Prime Directives as Alex Murphy/RoboCop, his most recent project was in the 2002 TV movie Haven't We Met Before?

Fletcher has made guest appearances on episodes of The Beachcombers, Street Legal, Forever Knight, Lexx, Earth: Final Conflict, The Twilight Zone and Night Heat.

== Filmography ==
=== Film ===
Year	Title	Role	Notes
1982	Humongous	Tom Rice	
1983	American Nightmare	Mark / Tina's boyfriend	
1988	Martha, Ruth and Edie	Whitney Gerrard	
1989	Buying Time	Curtis	
1989	Friends, Lovers, & Lunatics	Buddy	
1991	Midnight Fear	John	
1994	Savage Land	Stranger	

=== Television ===
Year	Title	Role	Notes
1983	A Matter of Cunning	Brian	Television film
1983–1991	The Hitchhiker	The Hitchhiker	82 episodes
1984	The Edison Twins	Space Cadet	Episode: "Mars to Paul"
1985	In Like Flynn	Tim Holden	Television film
1987	The Beachcombers	Jaff	Episode: "By the Pricking of My Thumbs"
1987	Haunted by Her Past	Lt. Eisley	Television film
1987	Check It Out!	Handsome Man	Episode: "Puppy Love"
1987	Street Legal	Mac	Episode: "Mr. Nice Guy"
1988	Night Heat	Apache / Kurtz	2 episodes
1988	Alfred Hitchcock Presents	John Harris	Episode: "Pen Pal"
1989	The Twilight Zone	Guillaume de Marchaux	Episode: "Cat and Mouse"
1989	The Campbells	Sam Carver	Episode: "Stand and Deliver"
1991	Tropical Heat	Malloy	Episode: "A Perfect .38"
1991	Counterstrike	Jason	Episode: "The Millerton Papers"
1992	Secret Service	Stalker	Episode: "The Stalker/Bomb Protective Mission"
1993	Top Cops	Richard Arnold	Episode: "Jim Amburgey/Joe Cialone/Richard Arnold"
1993	Ordeal in the Arctic	Lieutenant Joe Bales	Television film
1993	Trial & Error	Ken Norwich	Television film
1993	Counterstrike	Jeremy Holifield	Episode: "Bad Guys"
1994	Due South	Frank Drake	Episode: "Pilot"
1994, 1996	Kung Fu: The Legend Continues	Coach Flores / Wayne	2 episodes
1995	The Outer Limits	Joe Travers	Episode: "The Choice"
1995	Forever Knight	Trilling	Episode: "Baby Baby"
1996	Lonesome Dove: The Series	James Quinn	Episode: "Lover's Leap"
1997	Major Crime	Travis Miller	Television film
1998	Earthquake in New York	Mallik	Television film
1999	Lexx	Captain Jebbed	Episode: "Love Grows"
1999	Earth: Final Conflict	Max Pratt	Episode: "Thicker Than Blood"
2001	RoboCop: Prime Directives	RoboCop	4 episodes
2002	Haven't We Met Before?	Stephen Koenig	Television film
