= ZeD =

Canadian television program and website

- Created by: Rae Hull & McLean Greaves
- Presented by: Sharon Lewis; Ziya Tong
- Country of origin: Canada

Production
- Executive producer: McLean Greaves

Original release
- Network: CBC
- Release: March 18, 2002 – 2006

ZeD was a Canadian variety television program that aired on CBC Television from March 18, 2002 to 2006. Hosted primarily by Sharon Lewis and Ziya Tong, ZeD publicized both domestic and international creative works, including a substantial portion of material created by viewers and new artists. ZeD thus considered itself to be "open-source television."

The associated website claimed thousands of users, and the series, while somewhat obscure, was nominated for several awards and influenced some US television. A music album, ZeD: Live Off The Floor, was also spun off from the series.

== Concept and creation ==
The concept of ZeD was originally developed by Rae Hull, who was the regional director for CBC in Vancouver, British Columbia. and new media pioneer McLean Greaves. It was initially imagined as being "free-form, hip and fast moving, with no segment longer than a few minutes," but beyond this contributors would influence the content.

In November 2001, CBC invited Canadians to come up with cheap but intelligent creative ideas in connection with the anticipated series "zed," and received 1,000 efforts. When ZeD premiered on March 18, 2002, it was still considered to be in development, and its first four weeks from March to April were experimental. It was not advertised, except for CBC informing the press, since ZeD was meant to be discovered among viewers who would then inform other viewers. CBC was still hoping to attract contributors, and Hull added, "I'd be happy if people discovered ZeD and made their own decisions about it."

In March 2002, the series was called ZeD beta v 0.1. The name ZeD appears to have been chosen to suggest the series was uniquely Canadian, since zed is how Canadians pronounce the letter "Z." The ZeD website was also launched at the time. Both the series and website were based in Vancouver.

== Format ==
The program, which aired every weeknight on the CBC, aired music, short films, animation, visual art and spoken word pieces from around the world. The subject matter, which ranged from comedy to drama, was mature and could include nudity and profanity, and thus episodes began with a humorously worded call for viewer's discretion. Each episode was 40 minutes long, with no advertisements during the show.

=== Interactive website ===
Its website allowed people to view certain works, and also upload their creations onto the website, which might then appear on television. The press stated that 20% of the material on television had been uploaded from the website. Altogether, in 2002 the website claimed 5,000 members. In 2005, this had increased to 45,962 members. Although some films are not available on the website, viewers of the television show could e-mail ZeD and request replays on Fridays, which were named "Feedback Fridays".

=== Movies aired ===
Films seen on ZeD include Cannibalism and Your Teen, which is a humorous parody of the father-knows-best ideology, and Ryan. The anti-racism comedy Cowboys and Indians was also aired more than once. Other popular short films include the animated comedy Strange Invaders, which combines the themes of extraterrestrials and parenthood and notably appeared on ZeD on March 22, 2002, as well as George Lucas in Love. Since works by viewers ranged in quality, ZeD required rigorous editing, especially to avoid copyright violations. Artists generally received $200 for each minute of work published by ZeD.

=== Music ===
Music on ZeD was sometimes presented in the form of music videos, but musical guests also appeared. Among such guests were William Clarke Brown, who was also known as Lyrical, and claimed No. 1 spot for most voted musician, and Sam Roberts, who performed "Brother Down" and "This Is How I Live" on October 15, 2002. On December 2, 2003, an album was produced by music producer Jon Siddall and Mashingaidze-Greaves, titled ZeD: Live Off The Floor which featured music taken live off ZeD. Eye Weekly critic Kevin Hainey said the music generally seemed "lush" and that the CD gave attention to upstart musicians such as Take 5. He especially approved of the new musicians, such as Kris Demeanor and The Floor. Tracks included:

- "This Is How I Live"
- "Monday Monday Monday" by Tegan and Sara
- "Evolution" by The Cinematic Orchestra
- "Big" by BrassMunk
- "Left and Leaving" by The Weakerthans
- "London Still" by The Waifs
- "The Centaur" by Buck 65
- "Untitled" by The Organ

=== Halloween specials ===
Another feature of ZeD was its annual Halloween episodes, which ran longer than 40 minutes. The 2004 special, "Night of the Living ZeD," was two hours long. These episodes featured some of ZeD's more disturbing short films and art, or comedies with supernatural or gothic themes. Evelyn: The Cutest Evil Dead Girl and Flying Saucer Rock'n'Roll are examples of the latter. In 2004, guest musician Jorane performed a "witchy acid cello" and there were "several freaky faux-Victorian sideshow acts in-studio."

=== Hosts ===
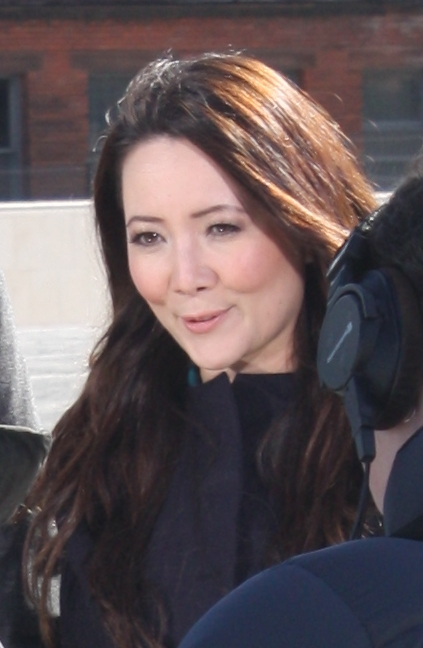
Ziya Tong hosted ZeD in its 2004-2005 season.

ZeD was originally hosted by several hosts including Bif Naked and Nobu and Mio Adilman. The program was subsequently hosted by Sharon Lewis until the 2004–2005 season, when she was replaced by Ziya Tong. Lewis also took time off to have a baby during her hosting, necessitating guest hosts such as the brothers Adilman. During this time, in March 2004, the Adilmans hosted Zed Uncut, which was a five-hour episode shot live.

== Re-formatting and cancellation ==
On January 3, 2006, ZeD was revived as three television series to air weekly. Zed Real was the first, playing on Tuesdays, hosted by Jarrett Martineau and featuring documentaries. Zed Candid, airing on Wednesdays, featured short films and was hosted by Trish Williams, Suzanne Bastien and Zorana Sadiq. Finally, Zed Tunes aired on Thursdays, with a focus on music. It was hosted by Jenna Chow. All three continued to be aired on the CBC and ran for one hour, starting around 11:30 pm on their respective nights.

On May 7, 2006, the CBC announced the cancellation of the series. However, CBC said its website would still be available, and that "we're not letting go of some of the innovative ideas that the production crew have brought." Lise Lareau of the Canadian Media Guild replied that CBC was "abandoning the things that make public television special."

== Reception ==
ZeD was nominated for an Emmy Award. The series was nominated for Gemini Awards, including for Best Music, Best Variety Program or Series, Best Visual Effects, and Best Cross Platform Project. Tong was also nominated for a 2005 Gemini Award for Viewer's Choice for Lifestyle Host. In 2002, television critic Alex Strachan wrote that "Almost everything about ZeD is exactly right, from its sense of timing... to the lack of commercials" and that Sharon Lewis' style was nicely easygoing. That year, 70,000 watched the show, which was aimed at people in their twenties and thirties who were comfortable with technology. Still, the executive producer Mashingaidze-Greaves admitted that "millions of Canadians" did not know what ZeD was during its run.

The sexual content of the website and series was sometimes controversial. In 2002, some of CBC's critics on the website CBC Watch preferred to see the sexual content unaired, and CBC quoted them as predicting that "ZeD will mostly be remembered for taking the 'L' out of public broadcasting." ZeD also received letters from viewers who thought one short film featuring a sexual scene between brothers was unusual. ZeD explained that "ZeD isn't about gratuitous nudity or being gross just for the sake of being gross. Don't get us wrong. We're not squeamish about anything... except outright stupidity."

Current TV, a television channel launched by politician Al Gore in 2005, was partially influenced by ZeD. This led Mashingaidze-Greaves to express ZeD had "the world leaders in interactive television, without a doubt." Mashingaidze-Greaves also said he did not fear having a larger rival in Current TV and said ZeD would continually innovate itself.
