= Bob McDonald (science journalist) =

Canadian author and science journalist

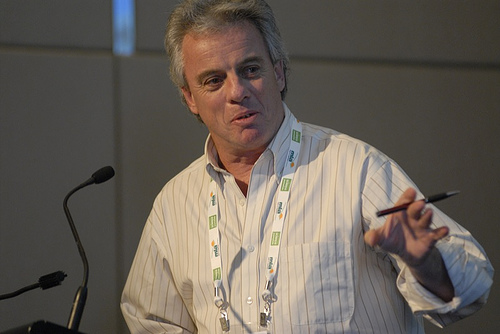
- McDonald in 2007
- Born: January 25, 1951 (age 75); Wingham, Ontario, Canada
- Occupations: science journalist, CBC's chief science correspondent, host: Quirks & Quarks

Bob McDonald OC (born January 25, 1951) is a Canadian author and science journalist. He is the national science commentator for CBC Television and CBC News Network (formerly Newsworld), and since 1992 has been the host of a weekly radio science show, Quirks & Quarks which draws approximately 800,000 listeners each week.

== Career ==
McDonald was an unexceptional student who admits he showed no aptitude for science, failed grade 9, and attended York University, studying English and Philosophy, but flunked out in his 2nd year. In 1972, with no formal academic training, he began his science communication career as a demonstrator at the Ontario Science Centre, and eventually travelled to California to watch the live action of NASA's Voyager 2 space probe launch. Upon returning to Canada, he was in great demand to talk about the missions and eventually became the regular science correspondent for a number of shows.

From 1986 to 1992, he was the host and one of the producers of Wonderstruck, a Gemini Award winning science program for children. Over the years he has hosted a variety of other science or technology themed specials and documentaries, including the special The Greatest Canadian Invention.

In 1992, he became the host of the weekly CBC Radio science program "Quirks & Quarks," taking over from Jay Ingram. The show is among the most popular on the network, and is also heard on Sirius XM Radio as well as a number of public radio stations in the United States.

On September 8, 2005, McDonald premiered a new three-season, 39-part series on TVO (formerly known as TVOntario) called Heads Up!, which he both wrote and hosted. Heads Up! was nominated for Gemini awards for best children's TV program and best writing for a children's TV program in August 2006, and best writing for a children's or youth program or series and best host in a preschool, children's or youth program or series in August 2008. He was awarded the Gemini for best host in a preschool, children's or youth program or series in October 2008. McDonald has written a number of books including Wonderstruck, Wonderstruck II and Measuring the Earth with a Stick: Science as I've Seen It, which was short-listed for the Canadian Science Writers Association book award.

== Honours ==
McDonald received the 2001 Michael Smith Award for Science Promotion, from NSERC, the 2002 Sandford Fleming Medal from the Royal Canadian Institute, and the 2005 McNeil Medal for the Public Awareness of Science from the Royal Society of Canada completing the "triple crown" of awards for science communication in Canada. He has been honoured for his work by the University of Toronto, Western University in London, Ontario, the University of Guelph, Laurentian University in Sudbury, Carleton University in Ottawa, McMaster University, the University of Calgary, Athabasca University in Alberta and the University of Winnipeg which each granted him honorary doctorates. McDonald was granted an Honorary Diploma in Environment, Media and Technology Studies from Niagara College on June 16, 2011, and an honorary diploma from Loyalist College on June 10, 2011.

In 2010, McDonald was initiated as an honorary life member of the Sigma Xi honour society.

McDonald was appointed as an Officer of the Order of Canada on June 30, 2011 "for his contributions, as a journalist and educator, to the public understanding of science."

In July 2014, an asteroid, that had previously been assigned the number 332324 and the designation 2006 XN67, was named after McDonald. This occurred at the request of David D. Balam, the Canadian astronomer who had discovered the asteroid.

== Bibliography ==
- McDonald, Bob; Binks, Bob; Grace, Eric; Pearson, Gary; CBC Enterprises (1988). Wonderstruck. Toronto: CBC Enterprises. OCLC 19295563.
- McDonald, Bob; Grace, Eric; Hemsworth, Sandra; Pearson, Gary; CBC Enterprises (1989). Wonderstruck II. Montreal: CBC Enterprises. ISBN 0-88794-360-8.
- McDonald, Bob (2000). Measuring the Earth with a Stick: science as I've seen it. Toronto: Viking. ISBN 0-670-88925-3.
- McDonald, Bob (2002). The Quirks & Quarks Question Book: 101 answers to listeners' questions. Toronto: M & S. ISBN 0-7710-5448-3.
- Lebans, Jim; Mcdonald, Bob (2008). The Quirks & Quarks Guide to Space: 42 questions (and answers) about life, the universe, and everything. Toronto: M & S. ISBN 978-0-7710-5003-9.
- Senson, Pat; Mcdonald, Bob (2008). Nasty, Brutish and Short: The Quirks & Quarks Guide to Animal Sex and Other Weird Behaviour. Toronto: M & S. ISBN 978-0-7710-7968-9.
- McDonald, Bob (2014). Canadian Spacewalkers: Hadfield, MacLean and Williams Remember the Ultimate High Adventure. Toronto: Douglas & McIntyre. ISBN 978-1-77162-044-4.
- McDonald, Bob (2024). Just Say Yes: a memoir. Toronto: Douglas & McIntyre. ISBN 978-1-77162-420-6.
