= Monsters Inside Me =

American documentary television series (2009–2017)

- Genre: Documentary
- Directed by: Kyle McCabe, Alexis Siggers, Sally Freeman, Ed Hambleton
- Starring: Dan Riskin
- Narrated by: Justin Peed (seasons 1-8); Brad Hyland (season 9); Jason Done (UK, until series 6)
- Country of origin: United States
- Original language: English
- No. of seasons: 9
- No. of episodes: 77

Production
- Executive producers: Nicola Moody; Erin Wanner; Dominic Stobart
- Producer: Kyle McCabe
- Running time: 60 minutes
- Production companies: Optomen Productions (seasons 1-8); Nomadica Films (season 9)

Original release
- Network: Animal Planet (seasons 1-8); Discovery Channel (season 9)
- Release: July 1, 2009

Related
- Bugs, Bites & Parasites

Monsters Inside Me is an American documentary television series about parasitic infestations and infectious diseases. The series utilizes first-person interviews with medical professionals and patients telling their personal stories about contracting rare diseases, as well as dramatizations of the patients' illnesses. Interviews with contributors were shot on location across North America. Dramatizations were mostly filmed near hospitals and homes in New York City.

== Summary ==
Each episode has dramatizations that show illnesses caused by an infectious disease or parasitic infestation. Once the agent has been identified, their life cycles and general behaviors are illustrated. Justin Peed is the narrator, and biologist Dan Riskin explains how and why each infectious agent works inside its host.

Out of the 216 cases documented on the show, only 12 of those ended in the victim dying, usually from a disease with an extremely low survival rate. The overwhelming majority of cases and their victims occur throughout the United States, but a few cases and their victims come from Canada.

The show's first two seasons focused solely on parasites and parasitic infections, but since the third season, the show has included scenarios and medical cases featuring non-parasitic illnesses and infections, particularly those caused by other pathogens such as viruses, bacteria, and fungi, as well as illnesses caused by foreign objects.

The second season premiered on Wednesday, June 9, 2010, and then returned for a third season on October 5, 2012. As of January 7, 2011, Monsters Inside Me was broadcast in Canada by Discovery Science. It also airs on Discovery in the UK, and broadcasts in different languages on various Discovery networks across the world.

The last episode of the eighth season aired on December 17, 2017. The show was initially considered canceled after this; however, the show would be revived nine years later for a ninth season, which premiered in November 2026 on Discovery Channel in both the United States and Canada.

== Episodes ==
=== Series overview ===
Season	Episodes	Originally released		
Season	Episodes	First released	Last released	Network
1	6	July 1, 2009	August 5, 2009	Animal Planet
2	10	June 9, 2010	August 25, 2010	Animal Planet
3	10	October 5, 2012	December 7, 2012	Animal Planet
4	10	September 30, 2013	December 18, 2013	Animal Planet
5	10	October 9, 2014	December 18, 2014	Animal Planet
6	10	October 29, 2015	December 22, 2015	Animal Planet
7	7	October 6, 2016	December 15, 2016	Animal Planet
8	12	October 15, 2017	December 17, 2017	Animal Planet
9	12	November 11, 2026	TBA	Discovery Channel

=== Monsters Inside Me: Extra Deadly ===
Monsters Inside Me: Extra Deadly is a spin-off of Monsters Inside Me that airs alongside the original show. It features reruns of episodes from Season 6 onward but adds extra on-screen trivia that appears when a condition, infection, or symptom is discussed. Aside from that, it also features on-screen trivia of various casual objects found in the episode, like when they were first invented. The spin-off started in 2016; the first season is composed of altered versions of all Season 6 episodes with added trivia, and would usually air before a brand new episode from Season 7 of the original show premiered. The second season, which started in 2017, is set to air altered versions of all Season 7 episodes and previously aired episodes of Season 8 with added trivia, and will premiere before brand-new episodes of Season 8 of the original show premiere.

==== Season 1 (2016) ====
No.	Title	Original release date	Viewers (millions)
1	"There's a Fungus in My What!?!"	October 13, 2016	N/A
2	"There's Something Living in My Knee!?"	October 20, 2016	N/A
3	"My Vacation From Hell"	October 27, 2016	N/A
4	"Help! My Son is a Leper"	November 3, 2016	N/A
5	"Worms Are Eating My Lungs"	November 10, 2016	N/A
6	"The Eyeball Eater"	November 17, 2016	N/A
7	"The Backyard Killer"	December 1, 2016	N/A
8	"They Hijacked My Eyeball"	December 1, 2016	N/A
9	"An Amoeba is Eating My Brain"	December 8, 2016	N/A
10	"All I Got For Christmas Is Brain Surgery"	December 15, 2016	N/A

==== Season 2 (2017) ====
No.	Title	Original release date	Viewers (millions)
1	"I Have a WHAT in My WHAT?"	October 15, 2017	N/A
2	"There's Something Living in My Hand!"	October 22, 2017	N/A
3	"My Wife is Rotting"	October 29, 2017	N/A
4	"My Hands Are Falling Off"	November 5, 2017	N/A
5	"My Evil Twin is Driving Me Crazy"	November 12, 2017	N/A
6	"My Second Brain Is Killing Me"	November 19, 2017	N/A
7	"Help! I'm Being Eaten Alive"	November 26, 2017	N/A
8	"There's a Maggot in My Head"	December 3, 2017	N/A
9	"Something Is Eating My Baby"	December 10, 2017	N/A
10	"My Brain Is Under Attack"	December 17, 2017	N/A

==== Season 3 (2018) ====
No.	Title	Original release date	Viewers (millions)
1	"The Monster in My Mouth"	April 5, 2018	N/A
2	"Braced for Death"	April 12, 2018	N/A
3	"I Can't Stop Coughing Up Blood"	April 19, 2018	N/A
4	"The Organ Shredder"	April 26, 2018	N/A
5	"My Lungs Are Rotting"	May 3, 2018	N/A

== Reception ==
Mike Hale of The New York Times said that "there's science amid the frightening stories" and that the series "really grossed him out."

Neil Genzlinger of The New York Times wrote "Forget 'American Horror Story.' For several years now the scariest show on television has been Animal Planet's 'Monsters Inside Me,' which recreates real cases of bizarre, life-threatening infections."

== Spin-off ==
In 2013, a UK spin-off called Bugs, Bites & Parasites premiered on Discovery Channel UK.
