= American Nightmare (film) =

- Theatrical poster
- Directed by: Don McBrearty
- Screenplay by: John Sheppard
- Story by: John Gault; Steven Blake
- Produced by: Ray Sager
- Starring: Lawrence Day; Lora Staley; Lenore Zann; Michael Ironside; Larry Aubrey
- Cinematography: Daniel Hainey
- Edited by: Ian McBride
- Music by: Paul Zaza
- Production companies: Mano Films Limited; Manesco Films
- Distributed by: Pan-Canadian Film Distributors
- Release date: March 18, 1983
- Running time: 88 minutes
- Country: Canada
- Language: English
- Budget: CA $200,000

American Nightmare is a 1983 Canadian slasher film directed by Don McBrearty and starring Lawrence Day, Lora Staley, Lenore Zann, Michael Ironside, and Alexandra Paul in her feature film debut. It tells the story of a successful pianist investigating the disappearance of his sister in an urban decadence as a serial killer targets prostitutes and sex workers. The screenplay by John Sheppard, based on a story by John Gault and Steven Blake, was influenced by the rising crime rates in American cities throughout the 1970s and early 1980s.

The film was executive-produced by Paul Lynch, who had previously directed Prom Night (1980). Filming took place in Toronto, Ontario in 1980 on a budget of CAD $200,000. The film initially received a small theatrical release in March 1983 in Canada before appearing on television in the United States the same year.

== Plot ==
In the dead of winter in a large unnamed American city, Isabelle smokes a joint on a cheap hotel bed while one of her johns finishes showering in the bathroom. At the sink, the unseen man puts on latex gloves. Isabelle makes an oblique reference to the man about a sex tape that was used as blackmail. The man exits the bathroom wearing only a towel and the gloves, and violently kills her, slashing her throat multiple times with a straight razor.

Isabelle's brother Eric, a successful concert pianist, arrives at her apartment, prompted by an incoherent letter she sent him. Isabelle's transsexual neighbor Dolly informs him that Isabelle is a stripper and prostitute using the pseudonym "Tanya". Dolly tells Eric that Isabelle has been missing for several days. Eric visits Blake Industries, where his estranged father Hamilton Blake is CEO and overseer of UniSave, a nonprofit outreach for abused and endangered children. Eric asks for his father's help in finding Isabelle, but Hamilton refuses, dismissing Isabelle for her "degenerate" lifestyle. Once Eric leaves, Hamilton pulls a photo of his daughter out of his desk to fondle.

Eric locates the strip club where Isabelle worked and speaks to her coworkers, including dancers Louise and Andrea, who live in the same apartment building. Finding no answers, Eric goes to the police station to file a report with Sgt. Skylar, who is dismissive of a missing prostitute. Later, Andrea is murdered in her bathtub by the assailant, who slashes her wrists before drowning her. As the killer exits the building, he is briefly spotted by Dolly. Andrea's death is ruled a suicide, though Louise disbelieves this. Meanwhile, Hamilton's right-hand man, Tony Shaw, asks Eric to play the piano at his father's UniSave Fundraiser, but Eric refuses. By tracing numbers in Isabelle's apartment telephone, Eric and Louise see several calls made to a cheap hotel.

Late one night, Louise is accosted by a strange man in an upstairs hallway of the apartment building and flees, only to be met by Eric outside. A frightened Louise leaves with Eric, and the two drive to the strip club. There, Dolly informs them she plans on leaving the city, as she is worried she too will soon become a victim. After their conversation, Louise performs a cabaret act in the club while Eric looks on. When Dolly departs the club that night, she is accosted in an alleyway by the killer, who brutally stabs her to death. Eric saves Louise from a mugging in the streets, prompting the two of them to return to Eric's hotel, where they have sex. As Louise sleeps, Eric sneaks out to the cheap hotel that Isabelle's calls came from; he strong-arms a hotel manager for information. The manager tells him of a man known as "The Fixer", who videotapes prostitutes having sex with their tricks. After spending hours searching for The Fixer, Eric locates him in an adult movie theater and forces him to reveal the videotapes’ location. Eric finally retrieves the tapes from a locker.

Meanwhile, Louise auditions for an advertisement acting job for UniSave, unaware of Eric's father's connection to the organization. Tina, another stripper who worked with Isabelle and Louise, ends her shift at the club that night. As she prepares to leave the club from her upstairs dressing room, she hears strange noises downstairs, and initially attributes them to Wally, a bouncer. When the noises continue, an unnerved Tina goes to investigate, arming herself with a decorative pitchfork. In the darkened club, Tina hears a stranger whispering to her, before she is tackled by the assailant, who slashes her throat. Meanwhile, Eric reviews The Fixer's videotapes, and is shocked to find that one of them reveals Isabelle and Hamilton having intercourse. Eric confronts his father with the evidence of incest, which Hamilton confesses began shortly after their mother's death. Eric leaves in disgust, and threatens to expose him with the tape, leading a distraught Hamilton to commit suicide.

Eric goes to find Louise at her apartment, but finds she is not home. While searching the building, he locates Dolly's corpse in the basement, and notices a UniSave pin clutched in her hand. Eric flees to the Blake Industries headquarters, where Louise has arrived for a callback audition for the UniSave advertisement. Louise is met by Tony, who reveals himself as the killer, murdering anyone who may have knowledge of his boss's secret incestuous affair. Tony chastises Louise and her friends for being dregs of society, and stalks her through the building with a knife. The two end up on the building's rooftop, where Eric spots them as he arrives in the parking lot. Eric reaches the roof and saves Louise, throwing Tony over to his death.

== Cast ==
- Lawrence S. Day as Eric Blake
- Lora Staley as Louise
- Neil Dainard as Tony Shaw
- Lenore Zann as Tina
- Claudia Udy as Andrea
- Page Fletcher as Mark
- Michael Ironside as Sergeant Skylar
- Larry Aubrey as Dolly
- Mike Copeman as The Fixer
- Tom Harvey as Hamilton Blake
- Paul Bradley as Motel Manager
- Alexandra Paul as Isabelle Blake

== Analysis ==
Writer Denis Meikle notes in his book Jack the Ripper: The Murders and the Movies (2002) that, though not explicitly stated, the film's screenplay borrows several elements from the Jack the Ripper murders that occurred in London in the late-19th century. Film scholar André Loiselle identifies the film as a North American variation on the Italian giallo film that "uses the pretext of a righteous investigation into the sleazy underworld to indulge in graphic displays of sex and violence."

== Production ==
Principal photography of American Nightmare took place in Toronto in 1980 on a budget of CA $200,000. The film was executive-produced by Paul Lynch, director of Prom Night (1980); its producer, Ray Sager, had also served as a producer on Lynch's film, as well as the Canadian slasher films Terror Train (1980) and My Bloody Valentine (1981).

== Release ==
American Nightmare opened theatrically in Edmonton on March 18, 1983, through Pan-Canadian Film Distributors. It subsequently aired on television in the United States on May 10, 1983. U.S. distribution was handled by Manos Films Limited.

=== Critical response ===
In his book Legacy of Blood: A Comprehensive Guide to Slasher Movies (2004), film writer Jim Harper notes that the film is "handled in traditional slasher style... done quite well, with a few stylistic flourishes here and there." Film critic and writer Scott Aaron Stine deemed American Nightmare a "seedy murder mystery" that will "undoubtedly interest fans of '70s sleaze more than '80s horror or splatter."

Brett H. of the horror film website Oh, the Horror! gave the film a favorable review, writing: "American Nightmare will impress some and turn off others, but its decaying and seedy aspects are undeniable". Jacob Helgren, writing for the Hysteria Lives!, also gave the film a positive review, stating, "[American Nightmare] is one I definitely recommend. How this one passed by without getting noticed, I'll never know…but I'm very happy to have this flick proudly posted on the shelf with all my other favorites!"

Rhett Miller of Canuxploitation!, wrote, "American Nightmare is a uniquely Canadian perspective on the depravity of [the United States]. While the message may be a tad too pessimistic, and the overall feeling of the film may be gritty, dark and depressing, it is nevertheless a quality motion picture. The giallo film in Europe was a way for filmmakers to comment on the physical and moral decay of its city streets, and [director Don McBrearty] has done something brave in reviving the fundamentals of the genre to offer a similar critique on America."

=== Home media ===
American Nightmare was originally released on home video in the United States and Canada on VHS format in June, 1984 by Media Home Entertainment. On November 6, 2012 American Nightmare was released on DVD by Scorpion Releasing, a home video label specializing in cult and indie movies.

== Sources ==
- Harper, Jim (2004). Legacy of Blood: A Comprehensive Guide to Slasher Movies. Manchester, England: Critical Vision. ISBN 978-1-900-48639-2.
- Loiselle, André (January 2013). "Canadian Horror, American Bodies: Corporeal Obsession and Cultural Projection in American Nightmare, American Psycho, and American Mary". Brno Studies in English. 39 (2): 123–136. doi:10.5817/BSE2013-2-8. ISSN 0524-6881.
- Meikle, Dennis (2002). Jack the Ripper: The Murders and the Movies. London, England: Reynolds & Hearn. ISBN 978-1-903-11132-1.
- Stine, Scott Aaron (2015). The Gorehound's Guide to Splatter Films of the 1980s. Jefferson, North Carolina: McFarland. ISBN 978-1-476-61132-7.
- Vatnsdal, Caelum (2004). They Came From Within : A History of Canadian Horror Cinema. Arbeiter Ring Publishing. ISBN 1-894037-21-9.
