= Jane Goodall: Reasons for Hope =

2023 Canadian documentary film

- Directed by: David Lickley
- Written by: David Lickley
- Produced by: David Lickley
- Starring: Jane Goodall
- Cinematography: Hugo Hitchings; Wesley Johnson; Michael Male; Reed Smoot
- Edited by: Lisa Grootenboer
- Music by: Amin Bhatia
- Production company: Science North Production Team
- Release date: May 30, 2023 (Science North)
- Running time: 45 minutes
- Country: Canada
- Language: English

Jane Goodall: Reasons for Hope is a 2023 Canadian documentary film, directed by David Lickley. The film features scientist Jane Goodall speaking on various reasons to maintain hope in a positive future, including environmental recovery in the Sudbury area, the reintroduction of the American bison to regions where it had long been virtually extinct, and the political and social engagement of youth.

The 45-minute IMAX film premiered on May 30, 2023, at Science North, with Goodall in attendance, before undertaking an international tour of IMAX theatres.

A shorter 25-minute version also toured the Northern Ontario region as part of a museum exhibition at venues including the Canadian Bushplane Heritage Centre in Sault Ste. Marie, the Thunder Bay Museum in Thunder Bay, the Lake of the Woods Discovery Centre in Kenora, and the Cochrane Public Library in Cochrane.

== Production ==
The production team undertook significant efforts to work in a sustainable and environmentally-friendly way, such as working with local crews to minimize the number of people who had to travel to each location, and careful planning to ensure that all waste materials generated by the production were recycled, inclusive of being prepared to bring any waste back to Canada for recycling if it could not be recycled locally. The team set a carbon emissions target of 261.56 tonnes, one-third less than the industry average of 391 tonnes typically generated by independent films, but their efforts ultimately brought them to an even smaller final footprint of just 100.46 tonnes.

== Awards ==
Amin Bhatia won the Canadian Screen Music Award for Best Original Score for a Short Film in 2023, and Brian Eimer was a Canadian Screen Award nominee for Best Sound Design in a Documentary at the 12th Canadian Screen Awards in 2024.

The film was also named the inaugural winner of a new special award for Sustainable Production at the Canadian Screen Awards.
