= Weevac 6 =

Stretcher used for the transport of babies

The Weevac 6 is a stretcher specifically designed for transporting babies, such as in hospitals or for patient evacuation. The Weevac 6 was invented by Canadian-born Wendy Murphy in 1985.

== Product history ==
Murphy developed the Weevac stretcher after watching coverage of the Mexico City earthquake, wondering why there was no evacuation device designed specifically for babies.

The origin of the name "Weevac 6" comes from the fact that the device is designed to transport "6 wee babies".

== Product description ==
Lightweight stretcher designed to carry up to 6 bundled babies in size-adjustable, heat-retaining pockets.

== Recognition ==
The Weevac 6 ranked at No. 35 on the CBC's miniseries The Greatest Canadian Invention.
