= Ordeal in the Arctic =

1993 television film

- Genre: Drama
- Based on: Death and Deliverance: The True Story of an Airplane Crash at the North Pole by Robert Mason Lee
- Written by: Paul F. Edwards (as Paul Edwards)
- Directed by: Mark Sobel
- Starring: Richard Chamberlain; Catherine Mary Stewart; Melanie Mayron; Scott Hylands; Page Fletcher
- Music by: Amin Bhatia
- Country of origin: Canada
- Original language: English

Production
- Executive producers: Ronald I. Cohen; David R. Ginsburg; Robert Lantos
- Producers: R.B. Carney; Jeff King; Wayne Stuart
- Production location: Edmonton
- Cinematography: Miklós Lente
- Editor: Allan Lee
- Running time: 96 minutes
- Production companies: Alliance Communications Corporation; Citadel; Provocative Pictures

Original release
- Network: ABC
- Release: February 15, 1993

Ordeal in the Arctic is a television film written by Paul F. Edwards and directed by Mark Sobel. The film stars Richard Chamberlain, Catherine Mary Stewart, Melanie Mayron, Scott Hylands and Page Fletcher.

The accident that Ordeal in the Arctic depicted, occurred on October 30, 1991, when Canadian Forces Lockheed CC-130E Hercules (130322 Boxtop Flight 22), from 435 Transport and Rescue Squadron (a part of Operation Boxtop), was flying from Edmonton, Alberta via Thule Air Base, Greenland on a bi-annual resupply mission to Canadian Forces Station Alert (CFS Alert). At night, while on final approach to the airstrip, the pilot, John Couch, apparently was flying by sight rather than relying on instruments. The aircraft struck a rocky slope and crashed on Ellesmere Island, approximately 16 km (9.9 miles) short of the runway, resulting in the death of four of the 18 passengers and crew. Subsequent rescue efforts by personnel from CFS Alert, USAF personnel from Thule AB and CF personnel from 440 Squadron, CFB Edmonton, Alberta, and Trenton, Ontario, were hampered by a blizzard and local terrain. Couch died of exposure while awaiting rescue. (Note: The subsequent crash investigation recommended all CC-130s be retrofitted with ground proximity detectors and beefed-up Arctic survival equipment.)

== Plot ==
While heading to Alert in the far north on October 30, 1991, pilot Captain John Couch misjudges his altitude and crashes 10 miles from the base. Master Corporal Roland Pitre, the loadmaster, is the first to die while three others also do not survive the impact: Warrant Officer Robert Grimsley, Master Warrant Officer Tom Jardine, and Captain Judy Trépanier.

Of the survivors, Susan Hillier, and Master Corporal David Meace, because of possible spinal injuries, cannot be moved to the tail end of the aircraft with the others. During the 32-hour ordeal, Couch makes multiple trips to check on Sue and Dave, while Captain Wilma De Groot, keeps the others calm, before succumbing in the cold weather.

Although they are able to see the base prior to the crash, blizzard-like conditions prevent anyone from going for help. Once search and rescue crews are sent to look for the aircraft, survivors are able to communicate with Boxtop 21, searching by air using a two-way radio. As the weather calms, search and rescue (SAR) technicians are able to parachute down to the site, while those searching by ground arrive soon after.

== Cast ==
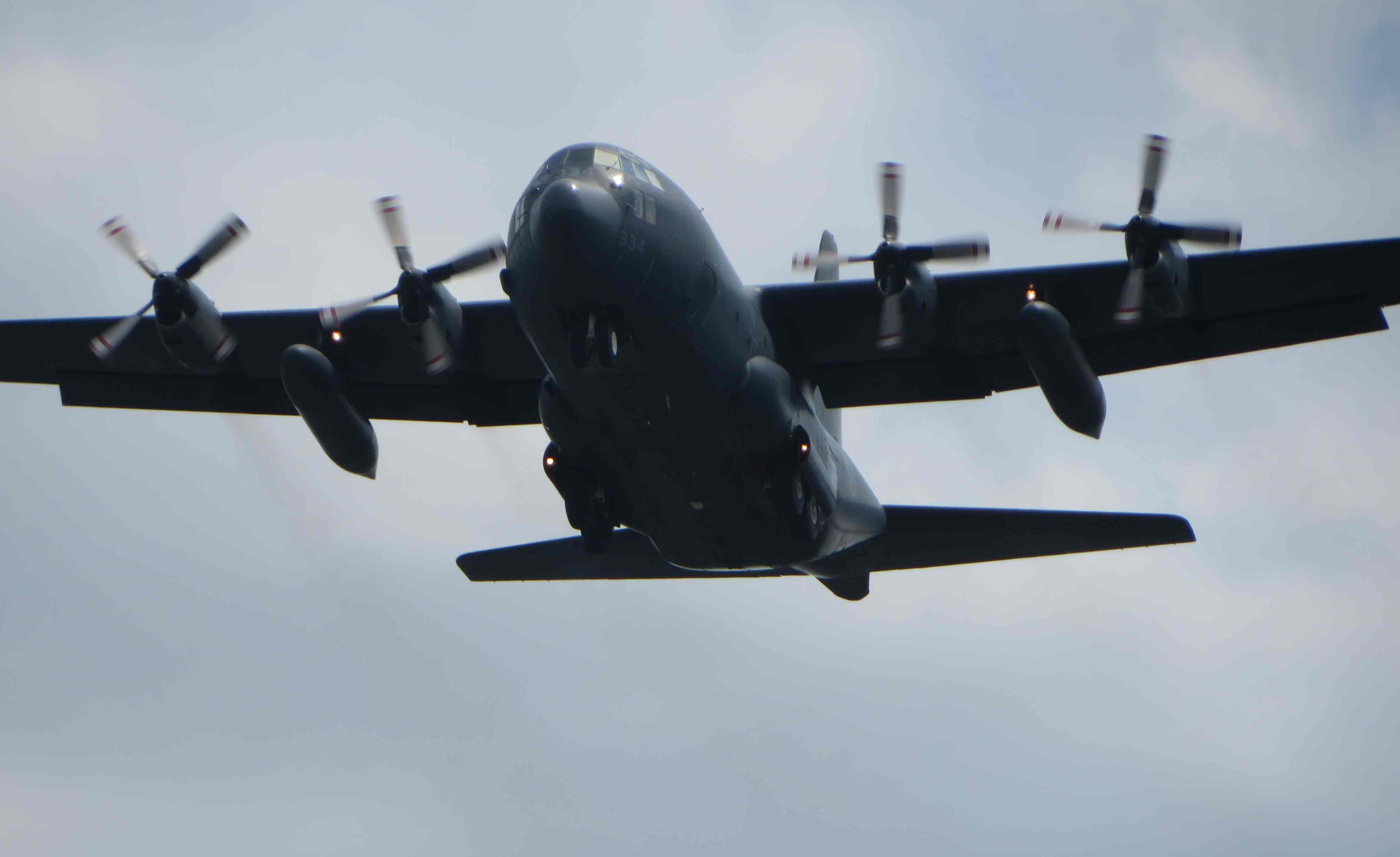
Lockheed CC-130 Hercules from RCAF No.435 Transport and Rescue Squadron

- Richard Chamberlain as Captain John Couch, pilot Boxtop 22
- Catherine Mary Stewart as Captain Wilma De Groot, doctor
- Melanie Mayron as Susan "Sue" Hillier
- Scott Hylands as Fred Ritchie
- Page Fletcher as Lieutenant Joe Bales
- Christopher Bolton as Lieutenant Michael "Mike" Moore
- Richard McMillan as Bob Thompson (credited as Richard MacMillan)
- Tom Butler as Arnie Macauley
- Robert Clinton as Sergeant Paul West
- Blair Haynes as Master Corporal Roland "Rollie" Pitre, traffic technician
- Stephen Sparks as Master Corporal Tony Cobden
- Brian Jensen as Master Corporal David "Dave" Meace
- Larry Yachimec as Warrant Officer Robert Grimsley, supply technician
- Cecily A. Adams as Captain Judy Trépanier, logistics office
- Nathan Fillion as Master Warrant Officer Tom Jardine
- Stephen Sparks as Tony Cobden
- Mark Gibbon as Master Seaman "Monty" Montgomery
- David Cameron as Master Corporal Mario Ellefsen
- Steve Adams as Private Bill Vance
- David McNally as Marc Tremblay
- Larry Musser as Rick Dumoulin
- Francis Damberger as Jimmy Brown
- Fred Keating as Major MacLain
- Wendell Smith as Major Blair
- Paul Whitney as Marvin Macauley
- Dave Nichols as Don Hansen
- Aaron Goettel as Tech No. 1
- Karen Gartner as Tech No. 2
- Mike Kobayashi as himself
- Dodd Rougeau as Condly
- Garry Chalk as Rescue 242 Pilot
- Brian Taylor as Boxtop 21 Pilot
- Roger Shank as Nodwell Driver
- Darryl Shuttleworth as Ground Commander

== Production ==
Ordeal in the Arctic was filmed at Canadian Forces Base Edmonton over a four-week period in November and December 1992. Although a northerly location in Canada, the terrain is very different from the tundra of Alert, Nunavut. To replicate the sunless conditions near the North Pole, filming was done mainly at night. Master Corporal Mike Kobayashi, an SAR Tech from 440 Squadron, who participated in the actual rescue, portrayed himself in the film. Another SAR Tech involved in the rescue, Master Corporal Tim Eagle from 440 Squadron, acted as the SAR technical advisor.

Ordeal in the Arctic is an adaptation of Robert Mason Lee's non-fiction book Death and Deliverance: The Haunting True Story of the Hercules Crash at the North Pole. His book thoroughly documented the 1991 crash and subsequent rescue.

== Reception ==
Ordeal in the Arctic was considered a typical "made-for-TV" production, although it had the advantage of covering a story that had recently been in the news. Despite the real-life heroics, reviews were mainly tepid. Patricia Brennan from The Washington Post advised: "If you sit down to watch “Ordeal in the Arctic,” bring along a cup of tea. It's a movie that's a little hard to warm up to." Reviewer Chris Willman from the Los Angeles Times wrote, "Considerable heroism is involved in this true-life survival story, to be sure – but, truth be told, it's mostly a bunch of people sitting around in the dark shivering."
