= Gill Deacon =

Canadian author and broadcaster

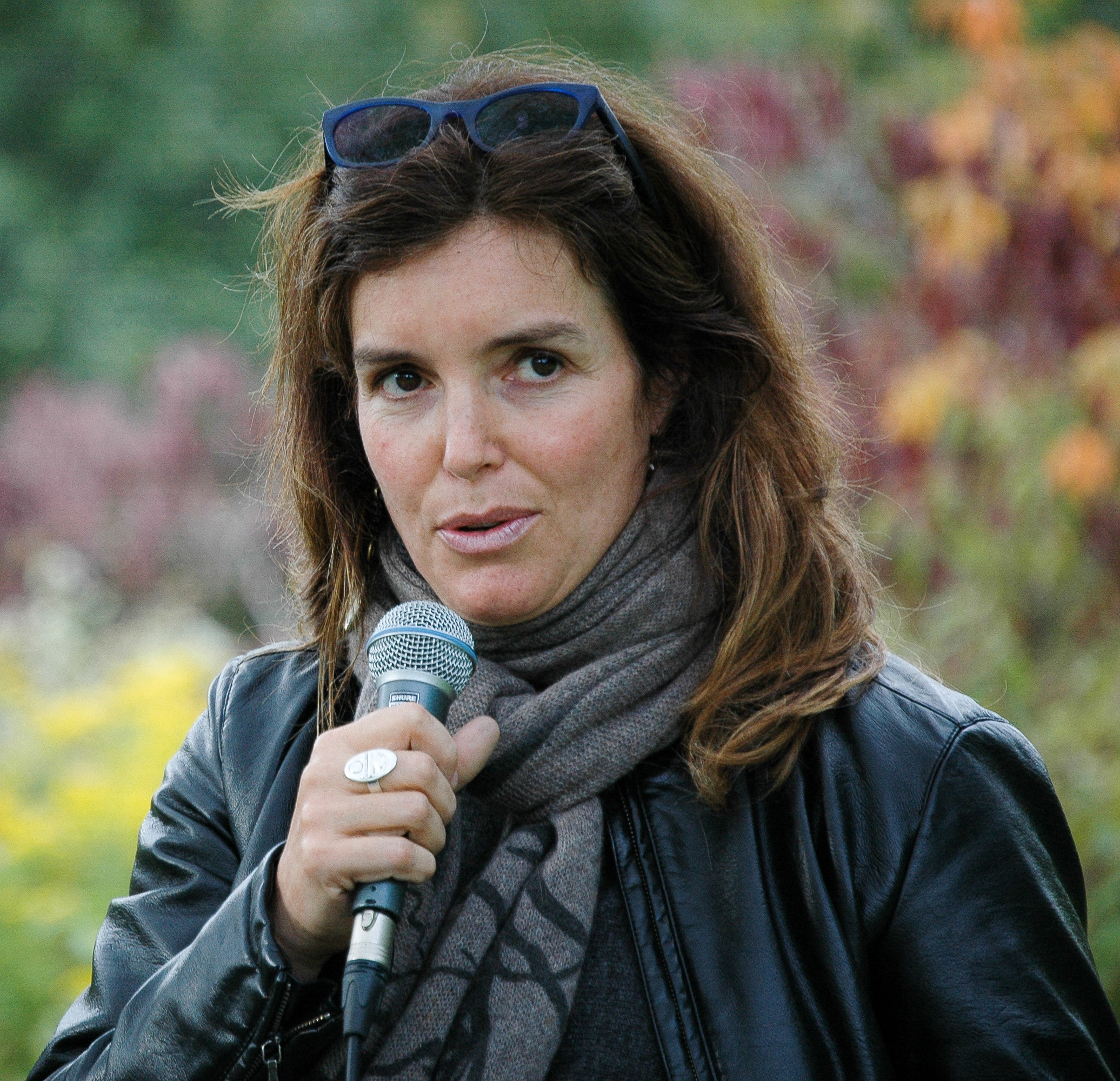
- Deacon at the Eden Mills Writers' Festival in 2014
- Born: Gillian Deacon; April 26, 1966 (age 60); Toronto, Ontario, Canada
- Occupations: Journalist, author, radio host

Gillian "Gill" Deacon (born April 26, 1966) is a Canadian author and broadcaster, best known as a former host of Here and Now on CBLA-FM in Toronto. In 2016, she was the moderator of the national Canada Reads competition.

== Biography ==
Before working in radio, Gillian Deacon was a television broadcaster. She hosted the CBC's flagship daytime television show, The Gill Deacon Show on CBC Television, from 2006 to 2007. Her past TV hosting credits include co-hosting Discovery Channel Canada's @discovery.ca with Jay Ingram from 1996 to 2002, as well as hosting CBC Television's Code Green.

Deacon has also worked as a television host for CBC Montreal and CTV. In Montreal, she spent four years hosting and writing for Citybeat, a national half-hour program showcasing Quebec arts and culture. During that time, she was also a weekly arts correspondent for CBC News: Morning on CBC Newsworld.

Deacon is known for her interest in environmental issues. Her first book, Green for Life (Penguin Books, 2008), a book of practical alternatives and solutions for leaving a smaller ecological footprint, was a national bestseller. From 2008 to 2009, she wrote a monthly greening column of the same name for Chatelaine.

Her second book, There's Lead in Your Lipstick: Toxins in Our Everyday Bodycare and How to Avoid Them (Penguin Books, 2011), was an Amazon Top 100 book and spent several weeks on The Globe and Mail bestsellers list. Deacon is active as a public speaker, giving presentations for organizations looking to broaden their commitment to sustainability.

Before establishing her career in journalism, she taught elementary school children with learning disabilities, guided bicycle tours in Europe and New Zealand, and was the lead singer for the band Bag of Hammers with Kevin Fox. She is married to Grant Gordon, who has been involved in politics with the Liberal Party and who founded Key Gordon, an advertising and design firm.

Deacon is a two-time survivor of breast cancer; her first occurrence was in 2009, and she had a recurrence in August 2018. She underwent surgery and chemotherapy after each occurrence. After her second remission, she returned to broadcasting on the CBC in September 2019.

Beginning in December 2022, Deacon began a medical leave of absence from the CBC and Here and Now due to the effects of long COVID. In September 2024 she announced that while her health had recovered, she had chosen to step down from full-time daily hosting, and instead would transition into other roles with the CBC, including podcasting and occasional fill-in hosting, while writing a book.
