= The Gill Deacon Show =

Canadian talk show

- Genre: Talk show
- Presented by: Gill Deacon
- Country of origin: Canada
- Original language: English
- No. of seasons: 1

Production
- Production location: Canadian Broadcasting Centre

Original release
- Release: October 30, 2006 – May 30, 2007

The Gill Deacon Show was a Canadian talk show that aired on CBC Television between October 30, 2006, and May 30, 2007. Hosted by Gill Deacon, the show featured segments on crafts, cooking and inspirational stories.

It was cancelled after just one season.

The show was succeeded as CBC Television's main daytime talkshow by Steven and Chris, which debuted in early 2008.
