= Haven't We Met Before? =

2002 mystery film

- Film poster
- Genre: Mystery
- Written by: Mary Higgins Clark; John Rutter
- Directed by: René Bonnière
- Starring: Nicollette Sheridan; Page Fletcher; Anthony Lemke
- Original language: English

Original release
- Release: 2002

Haven't We Met Before? is a 2002 mystery film starring Nicollette Sheridan, Page Fletcher, Anthony Lemke and Daniela Amavia. It was directed by René Bonnière and written by Mary Higgins Clark and John Rutter.

== Plot ==
A man is convinced that a female law student killed him in a past life and hunts her down to murder her. The law student survives the assault and her attacker is committed to a mental hospital. A police detective then suspects the attempted murder was not an isolated incident.
