= The Greatest Canadian Invention =

- Narrated by: Bob McDonald
- Country of origin: Canada

Production
- Camera setup: Multiple-camera
- Running time: ~120 minutes

Original release
- Network: CBC
- Release: 3 January 2007

The Greatest Canadian Invention is a two-hour special, hosted by Bob McDonald, that premiered on 3 January 2007 at on CBC Television. It began with CBC viewers voting online on which invention (out of 50) they considered to be the greatest Canadian invention. The show is a spiritual sequel to The Greatest Canadian.

== Commentators ==
The 22 commentators for the show are:

- Margaret Atwood – Writer and inventor of the LongPen
- Buck 65 – Hip hop musician
- Jackie Duffin – Medical History professor at Queen's University
- Will Ferguson – Author and Humorist
- Danielle Goyette – Hockey player and Olympic gold medallist
- Chris Hadfield – Astronaut
- Mike Holmes – Home renovation specialist, TV host of Holmes on Homes
- Mike Lazaridis – President of Research In Motion; inventor of the BlackBerry
- Preston Manning – Trustee of the Manning Innovation Awards
- Patrick McKenna – Comedian and actor
- Miriam McDonald – Actress and star of Degrassi: The Next Generation
- Mitsou – Singer and CBC TV host
- Steve Nash – Basketball player, 2 time NBA MVP
- Kathryn O'Hara – Professor of Science Journalism at Carleton University
- Abena Otchere – Science education advocate and medical student
- Drew Hayden Taylor – Playwright and columnist
- Debbie Travis – Home decoration specialist and TV host of Painted House
- Vikram Vij – Chef/restaurateur and cookbook author
- Michael Winter – Writer
- Ronald Wright – Writer
- Judy Cornish & Joyce Gunhouse (Comrags) – Women's clothes fashion designers

== Inventions ==
The inventions, in voted order, are:

1. Insulin
2. Telephone
3. Light bulb
4. Five-pin bowling
5. Wonderbra
6. Artificial pacemaker
7. Robertson screw
8. Zipper
9. Electric wheelchair
10. Poutine
11. Cobalt-60 "bomb" cancer treatment
12. Java programming language
13. Bloody caesar
14. Canadarm
15. Standard time
16. Electron microscope
17. Ski-Doo (snowmobile)

18. BlackBerry
19. Radio voice transmission
20. Birchbark canoe
21. Basketball
22. Retractable beer-carton handle
23. UV-degradable plastics
24. Instant replay
25. Goalie mask
26. Marquis wheat
27. Pablum
28. Lacrosse
29. Electric oven
30. Steam fog horn
31. Walkie-talkie
32. Alkaline long-lasting battery
33. Paint roller
34. Electronic music synthesizer

35. Weevac 6
36. Green garbage bag
37. Snowblower
38. Self-propelled combine harvester
39. Instant mashed potato
40. Explosives vapour detector
41. Marine screw propeller
42. Plexiglas
43. Key-frame animation
44. CPR mannequin (Actar 911)
45. G-suit
46. Ardox spiral nail
47. Automatic lubricating cup
48. Crash-position indicator
49. Caulking gun
50. Separable baggage check

== See also ==
- Canadian Made, 2012 television series
