= Richard Wildeman =

Richard Wildeman is a computer animator, part of the Science North Production Team. Science North is a science centre producing multi-media exhibits, displays and IMAX films.

== Selected works and multimedia experiences ==
- Aztec Theatre - Aztec On The River - TEA's Thea Award Winner
- Concorde Experience - Barbados Concorde Museum - Concorde aircraft histories (2006)
- Waterworks (2008)
- Ground Rules - Caterpillar Inc. (2008)
- Sudbury Neutrino Observatory - Object Theatre Update (2008)
- Rags To Riches - Xstrata (2008)
- Migration Story - Philadelphia Zoo (2009)
- Creatures of the Abyss - International Multi-Media Exhibit (2009)

== Critical appraise ==
The production team were among the winners of the 14th annual international TEA Themed Entertainment Association Thea awards.
