= Born to Be Wild (2011 film) =

- Theatrical release poster
- Directed by: David Lickley
- Written by: Drew Fellman
- Produced by: Drew Fellman
- Starring: Daphne Sheldrick; Birute Galdikas
- Narrated by: Morgan Freeman
- Cinematography: David Douglas
- Edited by: Beth Spiegel
- Music by: Mark Mothersbaugh
- Production company: IMAX Pictures
- Distributed by: Warner Bros. Pictures
- Release date: April 8, 2011 (United States)
- Running time: 41 minutes
- Country: United States
- Language: English
- Box office: $41.6 million

Born to Be Wild is a 2011 American nature documentary short film about orphaned orangutans and elephants. It was directed by David Lickley, and written and produced by Drew Fellman. It was distributed in the United States by Warner Bros. Pictures and IMAX Pictures. The film was released April 8, 2011, and is narrated by Morgan Freeman.

In March 2012, it won the Genesis Award for Best Documentary Feature from The Humane Society of the United States "for its celebration of the people rehabilitating baby elephants and orangutans orphaned by poaching and habitat encroachment".

== Critical reception ==
The film has received overwhelmingly positive reviews, receiving a 98% "fresh" score on Rotten Tomatoes, based on 41 reviews. Its critical consensus states: "The human story of Born to Be Wild is captivating and the accompanying nature footage is utterly cute and charming."

== See also ==
- List of highest-grossing documentary films
