= David Lickley =

Canadian documentary filmmaker

David Lickley is a Canadian documentary filmmaker, who makes IMAX-format science documentary films for the Science North Production Team in Sudbury, Ontario.

He is most noted as the director of the films Born to Be Wild, which won the Genesis Award for Best Documentary Feature from The Humane Society of the United States in 2012, and Jane Goodall: Reasons for Hope, which won a special award for Sustainable Production at the 12th Canadian Screen Awards in 2024.

He has also worked as a musician, most commonly in collaboration with singer-songwriter Paul Dunn. In 2023, Dunn and Lickley released the collaborative album Songs of a Northern Train.
