= Evolve (TV series) =

Documentary television series

Evolve is a 2008 documentary television series on the History Channel.

Each episode attempts to explain the evolutionary origins of a particular trait of living creatures: for example, Tyrannosaurus rex's 13-inch teeth, the gecko's "Velcro-like" toe pads, and the bald eagle's "telescopic" vision capable of spotting a hare a mile away.

== List of episodes ==
There are 11 episodes, which are available to buy in a compilation box set. The box incorrectly lists 13 episodes. Topics are of the episode as named.

=== Season 1 ===
1. "Eyes", Original air date: 29 July 2008
2. "Guts", ''Original air date: 5 August 2008
3. "Jaws", Original air date: 12 August 2008
4. "Sex", Original air date: 19 August 2008
5. "Skin", Original air date: 26 August 2008
6. "Flight", Original air date: 2 September 2008
7. "Communications", Original air date: 14 September 2008
8. "Size", Original air date: 8 November 2008
9. "Venom", Original air date: 8 November 2008
10. "Shape", Original air date: 8 November 2008
11. "Speed", Original air date: 26 March 2009
