= Amin Bhatia =

British-Canadian recording artist, film, and television score composer and producer

- Born: July 10, 1961 (age 65); London, England
- Occupations: Recording artist, film, television composer, producer
- Years active: 1981–present
- Awards: Roland Corporation International Synthesizer; Canadian Screen Award; Gemini Award

Amin Bhatia (born 10 July 1961, London, England) is a British-Canadian recording artist, film, and television music score composer and producer. In 1981, his compositions won the Roland Corporation International Synthesizer competition for two consecutive years. The judges included Oscar Peterson, Robert Moog, Ralph Dyck, and Isao Tomita. The exposure led to projects with David Foster, Steve Porcaro, and a solo album on Capitol Records "Cinema label" called The Interstellar Suite, which launched his career in music for film and television.

Bhatia is known for lush orchestral work with contemporary influences. His early compositions were created strictly with analog keyboards and tape, combining and layering several electronic parts to achieve a warm orchestral sound that was not sampled from an orchestra. In later years, Amin's strengths in both music and MIDI synthesizer programming led him to projects such as John Woo's Once a Thief and Iron Eagle II. Over the years Bhatia has moved into actual orchestral work with his film and television scores. The IMAX film Wild Chimpanzees features members of the Toronto Symphony and Opera Orchestras with songs recorded in Africa with Johnny Clegg. Other IMAX films include Mysteries of the Great Lakes and Wonders of the Arctic, the latter also featuring the voice of Tanya Tagaq.

Amin Bhatia has been awarded several Canadian Screen Awards and Gemini Awards for his music score work in television, and an Emmy nomination for the Disney animated television series Get Ed. Bhatia's projects include the TV series Anne with an E, X Company, Flashpoint with friend and longtime collaborator Ari Posner, as well as contributions to Handmaid's Tale. He has also worked as a consultant or programmer to many synthesizer companies including Roland Corporation, Q Sound, Arturia, and Spectrasonics.

Bhatia's recorded works include The Interstellar Suite, Virtuality, Requests from the Vault, and The Planet: Music from the Films of David Lickley. The Interstellar Suite was originally released in 1987 by the Capitol Cinema label, independently re-released in 2003, and in 2017 Amin Bhatia created The Interstellar Suite Anniversary Collector's Surround Sound Edition. Virtuality is a double concept album exploring the world within computers with guest artists including veterans Steve Porcaro and Patrick Moraz, as well as detailed liner notes written by synthesizer historian Mark Vail. In 2018, Bhatia released a synth retrospective called Requests from the Vault, and The Planet: Music from the Films of David Lickley.

He is the son of Indian (Khoja) parents who were forced to leave to Uganda during Idi Amin's rule and settled in London.

== Discography ==
=== Albums ===
- The Interstellar Suite (1987)
- Virtuality (2008)
- Requests from the Vault (2018)
- Anne with a E Soundtrack (2020)

=== Film ===
- Jane Goodall: Reasons for Hope (2023)
- The Wall Street Boy (Kipkemboi) (2023)
- Blood Honey (2017)
- Wonders of the Arctic (2014)
- Mysteries of the Great Lakes (2008)
- Recipe for a Perfect Christmas (2005)
- In the Dark (2003)
- Rescue Heroes: The Movie (2003)
- Detention (2003)
- Jane Goodall's Wild Chimpanzees (2002)
- The Wandering Soul Murders (2001)
- A Colder Kind of Death (2001)
- Under Heavy Fire (2001)
- Gold Fever (1999)
- Gridlock'd (1997)
- Once a Thief (1996)
- The Awakening (1995)
- A Stranger in the Mirror (1993)
- Ordeal in the Arctic (1993)
- Black Ice (1992)
- Café Romeo (1992) (additional music by Cos Natola)
- Primo Baby (1990)
- Iron Eagle II (1988)
- Storm (1987)

=== Television ===
- Handmaid's Tale (2018) (additional music)
- Let's Go Luna! (2018–2022)
- Anne with an E (2017)
- Blood and Fury: America's Civil War (2017)
- X Company (2015)
- Flashpoint (2008)
- Get Ed (2005–2006)
- Queer as Folk (2005)
- King (2003)
- Franny's Feet (2003–2010)
- Corduroy (2000–2001)
- The Zack Files (2000)
- Code Name: Eternity (1999)
- Power Play (1998)
- Once a Thief (1997)
- Blazing Dragons (1996)
- Pingu (1995–2000)
- Free Willy (1994)
- Tales from the Cryptkeeper (1993–2000)
- Kung Fu: The Legend Continues (1993)
