= Wonderstruck (TV series) =

Canadian children's television series

- Genre: Educational
- Presented by: Bob McDonald
- Country of origin: Canada
- Original language: English
- No. of episodes: 208

Production
- Running time: 30 minutes

Original release
- Network: CBC Television
- Release: January 8, 1986 – May 30, 1992

Wonderstruck is a Canadian children's television series that aired on CBC Television. It was hosted by Bob McDonald.
