= Alan Nursall =

Canadian journalist

- Born: December 26, 1957 (age 68); Edmonton, Alberta, Canada
- Education: Brock University; University of Alberta
- Scientific career
- Fields: Geography
- Workplaces: Laurentian University; Science North; Telus World of Science Edmonton; Discovery Channel Canada

Alan Nursall is a Canadian scientist and television personality, who reports on science news for the Canadian television series Daily Planet and the Alan Nursall Experience on the Discovery Channel.

== Biography ==
Nursall was born December 26, 1957, in Edmonton, Alberta and raised in the city. His parents taught at the University of Alberta, where his father was a professor of zoology.

Nursall, who has an M.Sc. in geography and meteorology, joined Science North in Sudbury, Ontario at its launch in 1984. He has been involved in all aspects of program and exhibit development at the science centre, and was a popular media commentator for his ability to explain scientific topics. He became science director of the institution in 2000, and served until 2007.

In 2007, Nursall founded NEXT Exhibits and Creative Communication, Inc, which specialises in providing exhibitions for museums and science centres.

From 2014 to 2023, Nursall served as the president and CEO of Telus World of Science-Edmonton.

Nursall's sister Catherine Mary Stewart is a film and television actress. His brother John Nursall is a freelance writer and has directed and produced multiple documentary projects.
