= Ziya Tong =

TV Personality

Ziya Tong CM
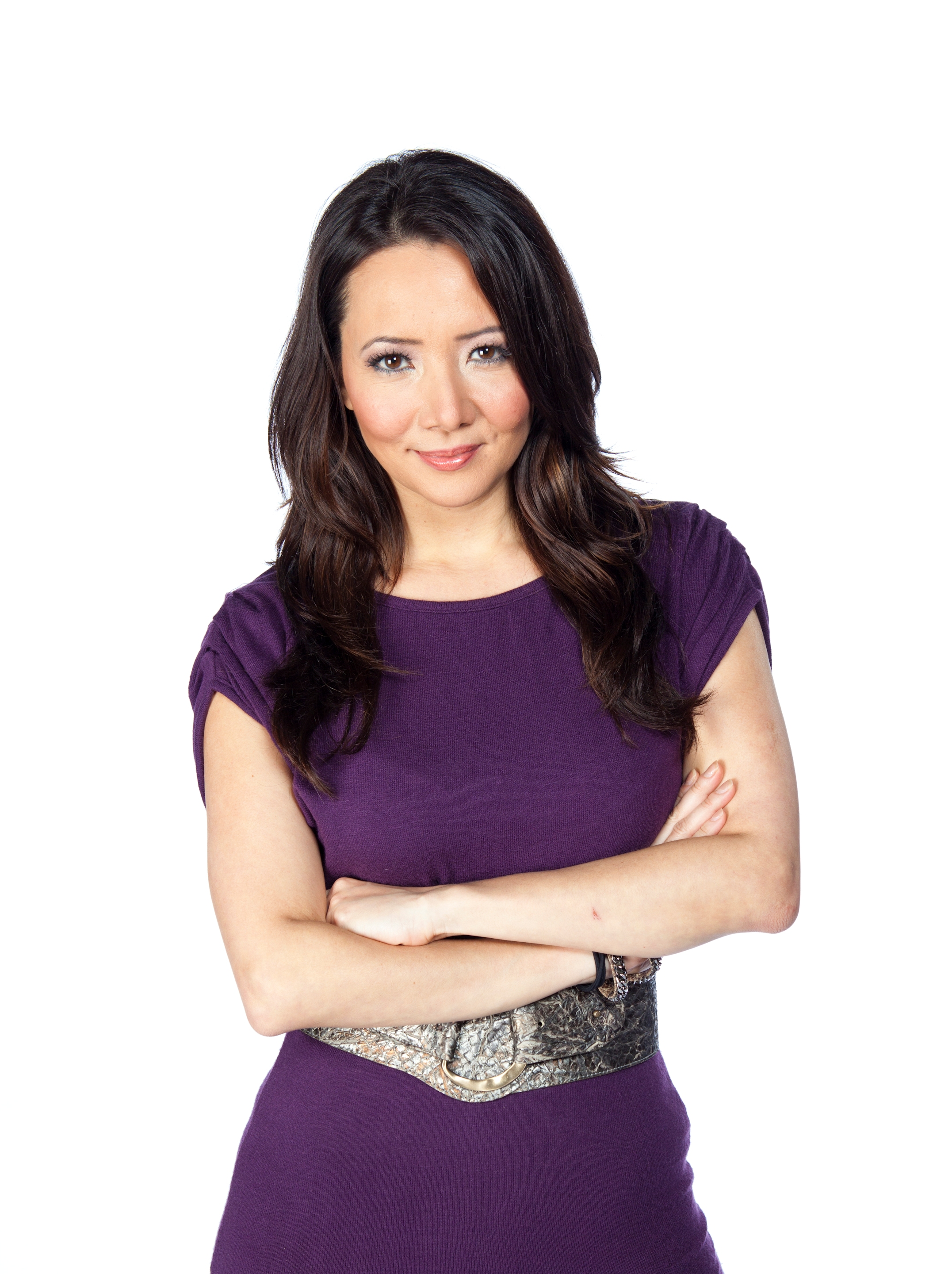
- Born: London, England
- Education: University of British Columbia; McGill University
- Occupations: Television Personality and Producer
- Years active: 2004–present
- Employer: Bell Media
- Known for: Co-host of ZeD; Co-host of Wired Science; Co-host of Nova; Co-host of Daily Planet
- Board member of: World Wide Fund for Nature Canada
- Website: ziyatong.com

Ziya Tong is an English-born Canadian television personality and producer, formerly the co-host of Discovery Channel's long-running primetime science magazine, Daily Planet.

== Early life and education ==
Ziya Tong was born in London, England, of Chinese and Macedonian descent, and later lived in Hong Kong. She moved from Hong Kong to Canada when she was 11.

She received her B.A. degree from the University of British Columbia in psychology and sociology. At McGill University, she graduated with an M.A. in Communications.

== Career ==
After university, she worked as a reporter, and as a senior producer for the news-portal Orientation Global Networks in New York.

Tong began hosting the CBC Television series ZeD in the 2004–05 season, succeeding Sharon Lewis. For this, she was nominated for a Gemini Award for Viewer's Choice for Lifestyle Host in 2005.

After ZeD, Tong was hired by CTV to host the television series Island Escapes, which premiered on January 6, 2006. Critic Denise Duguay called her a "lively and game travel host". In this position, she visited many exotic island locations, and highlighted the attractions of places such as New Caledonia, Bedarra Island and Fiji.

Starting in January 2007 she worked as a host and producer for two science shows, Wired Science on PBS and The Leading Edge, a Canadian science series on The Knowledge Network.

Tong has also written for Wired magazine and blogged on the Wired Science site for PBS. She also was a reporter for NOVA on PBS.

After joining Discovery Channel's Daily Planet as a guest host for November and December 2008, she was named the new permanent co-host of the daily science program.

For three years, Tong co-hosted Daily Planet with science journalist Jay Ingram. When Ingram retired from the program in June 2011, Tong was joined by co-host Dan Riskin and since, the show has generated record ratings as it completed its 18th season on Canadian television. Tong also writes and produces Ziyology, a weekly column looking at wonder and science.

She appears regularly on Canada AM, CTV News Channel, CP24 and CTV National News.

Tong has travelled to more than 60 countries. She is fluent in English and Cantonese, she is working on her French, Mandarin and Arabic.

She serves on the board of directors of the World Wide Fund for Nature (WWF) Canada.

Her non-fiction book The Reality Bubble was published by Penguin Random House in May 2019. The book was nominated for the 2020 RBC Charles Taylor Prize and won the 2019 Lane Anderson Award.

She defended Max Eisen's memoir By Chance Alone in the 2019 edition of Canada Reads. The book won the competition.

In 2024 Tong and Ben Addelman codirected the documentary film Plastic People, for which they won the Canadian Screen Award for Best Direction in a Documentary Program at the 13th Canadian Screen Awards in 2025.

She was made a Member of the Order of Canada on December 31, 2025.

== Career timeline ==
- 2004–2005: ZeD host
- 2006: "Island Escape" host
- 2007: "Leading Edge" host, Wired Science host and producer
- 2008–2009: NOVA reporter, co-host
- 2008–2018: Daily Planet co-host
