= Dan Riskin (physician) =

American entrepreneur and surgeon (born 1971)

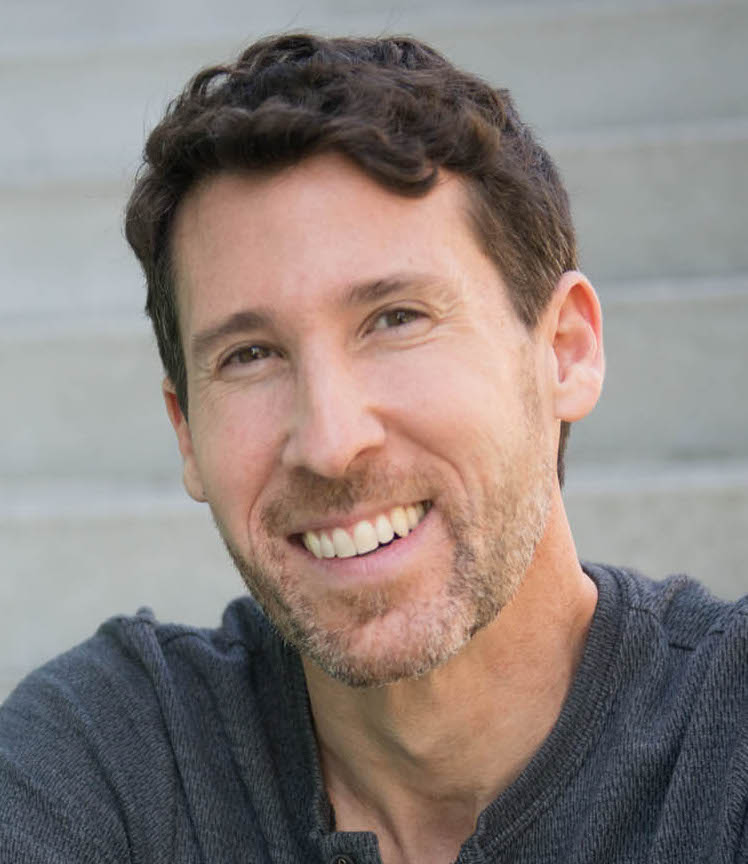
- Riskin in 2017
- Born: Daniel Jay Riskin; October 15, 1971 (age 54); Los Angeles, California, U.S.
- Education: Massachusetts Institute of Technology Stanford University University of California

Daniel Jay Riskin (born October 15, 1971) is an American physician and healthcare artificial intelligence executive. He is the CEO of Verantos and clinical professor of surgery at Stanford University. His work applies artificial intelligence in healthcare to improve the measurement of outcomes, risk, and clinical decision-making.

== Early life and education ==
Riskin grew up in Los Angeles, California. He began writing software at age 5, selling software at age 12, and winning regional awards in software programming during grammar school. At age 15, Riskin received the Bausch and Lomb Outstanding Scientist Award. He began college at age 16 as a Regent's Scholar at University of California.

While a student at the Massachusetts Institute of Technology and Stanford University, Riskin designed a wound closure device for which he was issued U.S. patents and received clearance from the U.S. Food and Drug Administration. He co-founded Wadsworth Medical Technologies, which was later acquired by DQ Holdings. The device has been used on hundreds of thousands of patients. During this period, Riskin was featured in MIT Technology Review as a Top 35 Innovator Under 35 for his work in healthcare technology.

Riskin earned a Doctor of Medicine degree and an MBA with a focus in bioinformatics, and holds four board certifications. As a young scientist, Riskin was awarded grants to advance the field of artificial intelligence from the National Institutes of Health starting in 2010 and the National Science Foundation starting in 2012.

== Business ==
In 2011, Riskin founded and became CEO of Health Fidelity, a health AI company focused on applying artificial intelligence to clinical data to measure quality and risk. The company raised venture funding and grew rapidly, influencing the care of millions of patients. The company's technology has been used by health systems and payers. It was acquired by Edifecs in a transaction valued in excess of $150 million.

In 2015, Riskin founded and became CEO of Verantos, a health AI company which determines preferred treatment for an individual based on clinical experience across millions of patients. Verantos has led research on data quality and artificial intelligence, including multiple FDA-funded demonstration projects and publications in leading journals. It was recognized as Bioinformatics Company of the Year in 2021 and was subsequently recognized by Inc 5000 and Deloitte Fast 500 as one of America's fastest growing private companies.

== Policy and public service ==
Riskin has advocated a bipartisan approach to leverage clinical data to improve US healthcare quality. He described two decades of health data reform. The first, from 2010–2020, would institute electronic data capture and enable value-based healthcare. The second decade, from 2020–2030, would leverage the massive amounts of collected data to tailor therapy and enable personalized medicine.

Focusing on the first decade of healthcare data reform, capturing electronic information and improving value-based workflow, Riskin promoted a transition to electronic health records and use of data to improve care as an advisor to multiple U.S. administrations. These efforts were enacted through the HITECH Act in 2009 and Affordable Care Act in 2010. Riskin's academic work "Re-examining health IT policy: What will it take to derive value from our investment?" encouraged national discussion on innovation and analytics. He founded and built a company, Health Fidelity, with a vision to capture accurate electronic information and improve value-based workflow.

Focusing on the second decade of healthcare data reform, tailoring therapy based on real world evidence, Riskin provided Congressional testimony in the 21st Century Cures Initiative in 2014. He met in a Congressional retreat to help refine the bill in 2015. The 21st Century Cures Act, passed in December 2016, included a pathway to incorporate real-world evidence into regulatory decision-making. Riskin's academic work describes an approach to use advanced technology and data to enable credible real-world evidence. He founded the company Verantos.

Riskin has continued to focus healthcare quality and data policy globally. He serves as a Congressionally appointed member of the US Health IT Advisory Committee (HITAC), has been an advisor to U.S. administrations, and advises governments in Europe and Asia on digital health and emerging technologies.
