= Daily Planet (TV series) =

Discovery Channel Canada TV series

- Also known as: @discovery.ca (1995–2002)
- Starring: Dan Riskin (2011–2018); Ziya Tong (2008–2018); Jay Ingram (1995–2011); Judy Halliday (1995–1996); Gill Deacon (1996–2002); Natasha Stillwell (2002–2007); Kim Jagtiani (2007–2008)
- Country of origin: Canada
- No. of seasons: 23

Production
- Running time: 60 minutes

Original release
- Network: Discovery Channel Canada
- Release: January 1, 1995 – June 5, 2018

Daily Planet was a television program on Discovery Channel Canada which featured daily news, discussion and commentary on the scientific aspects of current events and discoveries. The show first aired as @discovery.ca in 1995. It was relaunched as Daily Planet on September 30, 2002, adopting a "science magazine" programming format. The show adopted high definition in 2011. The show was cancelled by Bell Media on May 23, 2018 and its final episode aired on June 5, 2018.

From June 2012 until the show ended in May 2018, the hosts were Ziya Tong and Dan Riskin. Daily Planet aired on Discovery Channel Canada, Monday through Friday at 7 p.m.EST (Monday through Friday at 4 p.m.PST) as of September 4, 2012.

== History ==
Daily Planet first aired on January 1, 1995, the same day as the premiere of Discovery Channel Canada, under the name @discovery.ca, it was an hour-long daily news magazine with a science news segment and several feature segments. During this era, the show aired for the fall/winter season. The summer season aired the variant show Summer@discovery.ca, with the daily science news segment, and repeats of feature segments from the fall/winter season in a half-hour format.

Jay Ingram, who hosted the show since Discovery Channel Canada's inception, announced his retirement on May 16, 2011. Daily Planet: Jay's Last Show aired on Sunday, June 5, 2011, which paid tribute to the host with flashbacks and guest segments.

Previous co-hosts include Gill Deacon (1996-2002), Natasha Stillwell, who left the show on February 2, 2007, temporary co-host Patty Kim, and Kim Jagtiani, who left in September 2008.

=== Set design ===
During the summer of 2002, the set was completely remade for the name change from @discovery.ca to Daily Planet. During the summer of 2006, the set of Daily Planet was completely made over. On the season premiere in September, the end of the show was about the rebuilding of the set. During the summer of 2011, the set was rebuilt to accommodate the relaunch of the show in high definition on August 29, 2011.

== Foreign versions ==
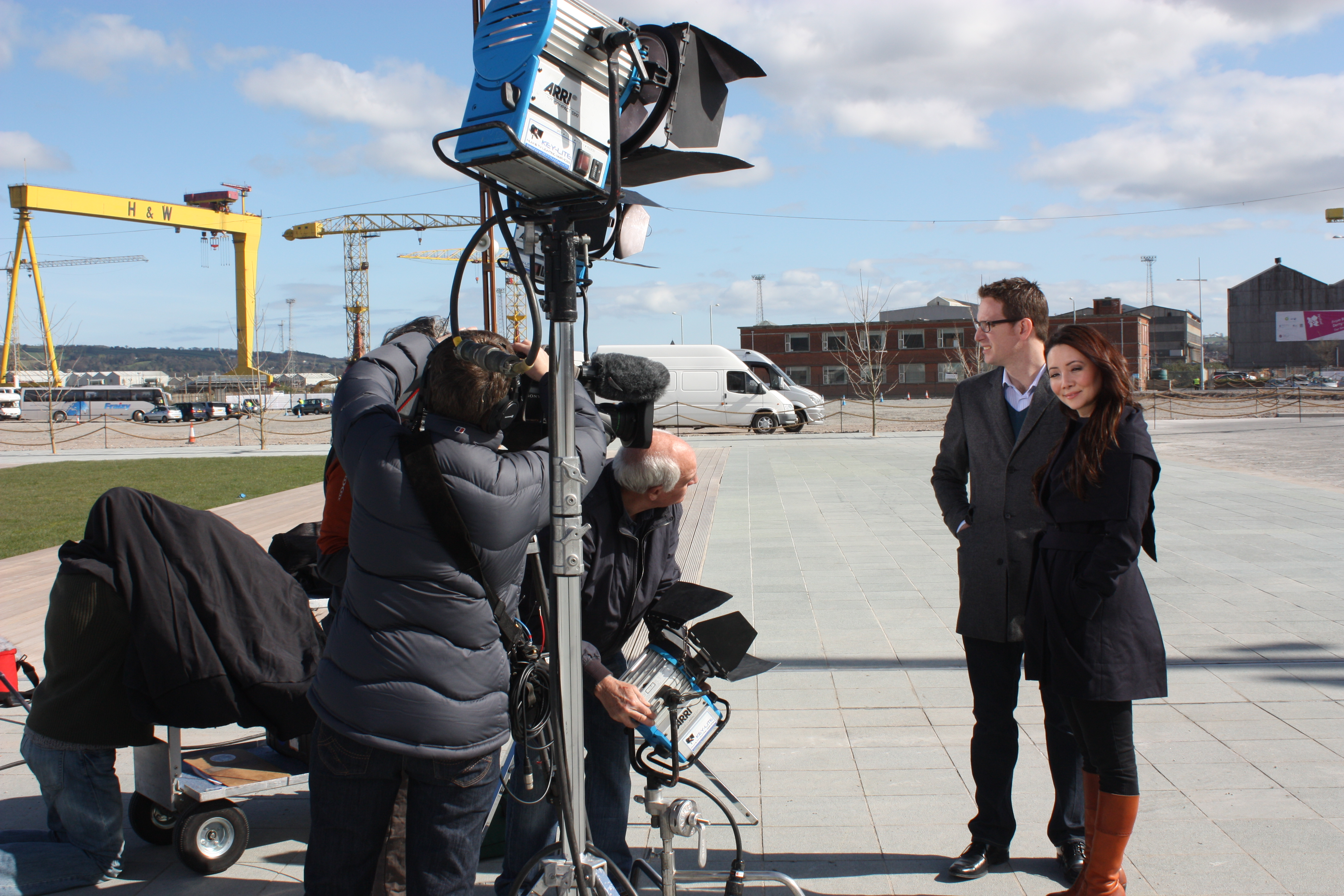
Co-hosts Ziya Tong and Dan Riskin on location in Northern Ireland during the opening of Titanic Belfast, April 2012

An American version of the series, Science Daily, which was based in Washington, DC, aired on the Discovery-owned digital channel The Science Channel (then branded Discovery Science Channel) from 2000–2001, during the @discovery.ca era. Patty Kim hosted from Washington, DC. A weekly version called Discoveries This Week, hosted by Dan Duran, aired on that channel until 2006. The Science Channel more recently simulcasted a live Daily Planet special called Mars: The Phoenix Lands in HD on May 25, 2008.

International versions of Daily Planet are also produced for Discovery Channel (United States) Discovery Channel Latin America and Discovery Channel Asia.

== Current programming segments ==
- MindBender – A weekly contest where the viewers are asked five science-based questions. Viewers who submit the correct answers online are entered into a draw for a digital camera or movie passes. From the 2002–2003 season to the 2008–2009 season, there were only 3 questions, with a warm-up question before the contest.
- Discoveries – Daily recap of science and technology headlines from around the world. (Known as Planet Now in the 2009–2010 season)
- Weird Planet – Showcasing an unusual scientific discovery or piece of technology.
- Planet You – Highlighting technology headlines and showing user-generated images and videos.
- Super Slo-Mo Tuesday – A slow motion video of varying topic.
- Ziyology – Host Ziya Tong interviews scientists and researchers about their work.
- Alan Nursall Experience – Alan Nursall explores the physics behind everyday objects and events. Some segments consist of public demonstrations of physics experiments with help from bystanders.
- Future Tech – Featuring Lucas Cochran as the tech correspondent reviewing upcoming tech, gaming and social media.
- Riskin's Business – Host Dan Riskin conducts experiments to learn how the world works and invites the audience to participate.

=== Former programming segments ===
- Behind the Scenes – Natasha Stillwell goes to commercial/industrial facilities to explain the workings of everyday items/service, similar to How It's Made.
- Kate's Page – (1995–1996) "@discovery.ca" segment features Kathryn Holloway discussing the Internet and web sites using blue-screen technology
- Joe's Chemistry Set (1995–2002) – Joe Schwarcz performs chemical experiments to explain chemical phenomena. It was eventually split into a 13-episode series named Science To Go.
- Weird and Wonderful Science (?–2002) – Originally called "Weird Science", it featured Richard Wassersug introducing strange scientific phenomena.
- Built In Your Backyard – Segment for home-made inventions.
- Fact of the Matter – Featuring various physicists to explain physical phenomena.
- Shannon's Gadgets – Shannon Bentley rates science's latest techno offerings.
- Starstruck – Ivan Semeniuk's weekly space column
- You Asked For It – @discovery.ca segment answering scientific questions from viewers. It was eventually turned into a separate half-hour show. In the Daily Planet era, it was relaunched in the 2005–2006 season as "Planet Q".
- Science And The City – Alan Nursall goes to public places to demonstrate physical phenomena by inviting public into performing experiments.
- Going for Green (Fall 2009) – A ten-part series showcasing some of the green technology in use at 2010 Winter Olympics venues.
- Jay's Journal – Jay Ingram's editorial column, discussing implications of information in science news.

== Daily Planet Goes specials ==
A full-hour, multi-episode series, where show hosts go to different places for the episodes.

- Daily Planet Goes To Japan (2005)
- Daily Planet Goes To China (2006)
- Daily Planet Goes To India (2008)
- Daily Planet Goes North (2008)
- Daily Planet Goes To Australia (2008)
- Daily Planet Goes Green (2008)
- Daily Planet Goes To Burning Man (2008)
- Daily Planet Goes To Alberta (2008)
- Daily Planet Goes To Vancouver (2010)
- Daily Planet: Titanic Under the Microscope (2012)
- Daily planet: Goes to Scotland (2015)

== Daily Planet special episodes ==
- Daily Planet Green Week (April 2009)
- Daily Planet Greatest Show Ever (June 2010)
- Daily Planet: Jay's Last Show (June 2011)
- Fire in the Sky: A Daily Planet Special (February 17, 2013)

== Hosts ==
- Jay Ingram (1995–2011)
- Judy Haladay (1995–1996)
- Gill Deacon (1996–2002)
- Jane Gilbert (interim host) (1998)
- Natasha Stillwell (2002–2007)
- Kim Jagtiani (2007–2008)
- Galit Solomon (interim host) (2007)
- Ed Robertson (guest host) (2008)
- Ellie Harrison (2008 interim)
- Karina Huber (2008 interim)
- Adam Growe (guest host) (2010)
- Patty Kim
- Valerie Pringle
- Ziya Tong (2008–2018)
- Dan Riskin (2011–2018)
- Ivan Semeniuk (fill-in host & host of Summer@discovery.ca)

== See also ==
- Beyond Tomorrow
- Tomorrow's World
