= Jay Ingram =

Canadian broadcaster (born 1945)

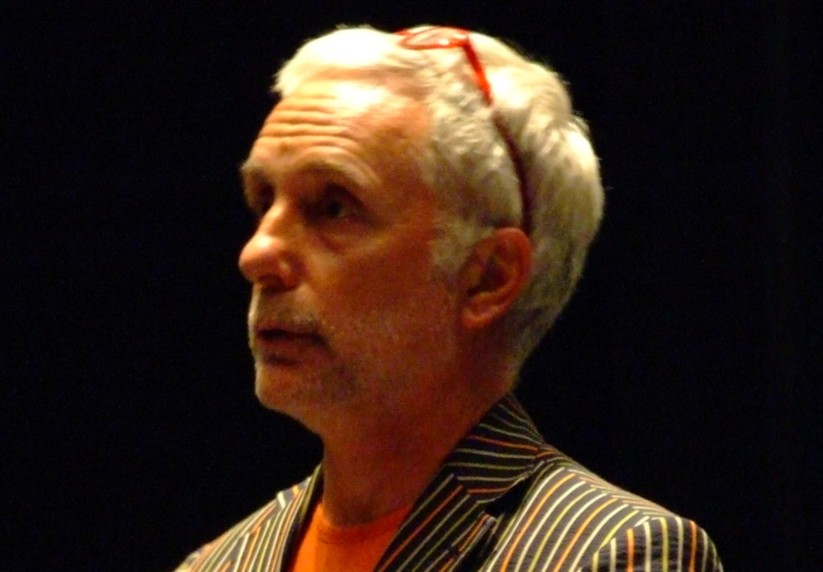
- Born: March 20, 1945 (age 81)
- Occupations: Author, broadcaster, science communicator
- Employer: Discovery Channel Canada

Jay Ingram CM (born March 20, 1945) is a Canadian author, broadcaster and science communicator. He was host of the television show Daily Planet (originally titled @discovery.ca), which aired on Discovery Channel Canada, since the channel's inception in 1995. Ingram's last episode of Daily Planet aired on June 5, 2011. Ingram announced his retirement but stated he will make guest appearances on Daily Planet. He was succeeded by Dan Riskin. His book The End of Memory: A Natural History of Aging and Alzheimer's was published by St. Martin's Press in 2015.

== Biography ==
Ingram hosted the science program Quirks and Quarks on CBC Radio One from 1979 (when he took over the show from David Suzuki) to 1992 (when he was succeeded by Bob McDonald). During his tenure Ingram won two ACTRA Awards and a Centre for Investigative Journalism Award. In 1993, Ingram hosted The Talk Show, a CBC Radio series about language, winning the "Science in Society Journalism Award" for his efforts. He then moved to CBC Television where he contributed science features to CBC Newsworld's Canada Live and segments on the brain to The Health Show on the main network. In November 1994 he moved to the Discovery Channel.

Ingram is the author of several bestselling books including Talk, Talk, Talk: Decoding the Mysteries of Speech, The Science of Everyday Life, The Velocity of Honey: And More Science of Everyday Life, The Science of Why, and The Burning House: Unlocking the Mysteries of the Brain, which won the 1995 Canadian Science Writers Book Award. Ingram's book Theatre of the Mind: Pulling Back the Curtain on Consciousness published by HarperCollins in October 2005 was chosen as one of The Globe and Mail's Top 100 books for that year. Ingram had a weekly science column for the Toronto Star for 12 years.

Ingram earned a bachelor of science degree in microbiology from the University of Alberta, followed by a master's degree from the University of Toronto. He has also been awarded honorary degrees from six different Canadian universities: University of Alberta, Carleton, McGill, King's College, McMaster and the University of Calgary. His books have been awarded three Canadian Science Writers' Awards. Since 2005 Ingram has held the chair in science communications at The Banff Centre.

In January 2006, Ingram launched Jay Ingram's Theatre of the Mind, a podcast inspired by his most recent book. The weekly program was co-hosted and produced by David Newland.

In 2009, he was made a Member of the Order of Canada "for his contributions towards making complex science accessible to the public as a broadcaster, public speaker and author, and for his leadership of future generations of science journalists".

On June 12, 2024 he was awarded "Doctor of Science, honoris causa DSc" from The University of Western Ontario.

Preceded by None	Daily Planet / @discovery.ca anchor 1995 – 2011 coanchor Ziya Tong	Succeeded by Dan Riskin
