= Proper Television =

Defunct Toronto-based unscripted production company

- Type: Subsidiary
- Industry: Media; Entertainment
- Founder: Guy O'Sullivan
- Fate: Acquired by Blue Ant Media, folded into Blue Ant Studios
- Parent: Boat Rocker Media (2017–2025); Blue Ant Media (2025–2026)

Proper Television was a Toronto-based studio focused on non-scripted programming, including reality and documentary-style programs. It was formed in 2004 by Canadian producer Guy O'Sullivan after leaving the BBC; its productions have included adaptations of international reality formats, such as Canada's Worst Driver, Come Dine with Me Canada, The Great Canadian Baking Show, and MasterChef Canada.

In June 2013, Proper Television acquired factual television distributor BuzzTaxi Communications.

In April 2017, O'Sullivan died at the age of 49. In September 2017, Proper Television was sold to Boat Rocker Media, with the studio continuing as a subsidiary under the leadership of Proper's former vice president of production Lesia Capone, and creative director Cathie James. Its distribution arm was folded into Boat Rocker Rights.

On March 24, 2025, Blue Ant Media announced that it would acquire Proper Television among other assets from Boat Rocker as part of a reverse takeover. The transaction was completed on August 1, 2025. Proper continued to operate as a subsidiary of Blue Ant until February 2026, when it was folded into Blue Ant Studios' unscripted division in a reorganization that followed its acquisition of Thunderbird Entertainment.

== Filmography ==
| Title | Years | Network | Notes |
|---|---|---|---|
| Canada's Worst Driver | 2005–2018 | Discovery Channel Canada | |
| Come Dine with Me Canada | 2010–2014 | W Network | |
| Redemption Inc. | 2012 | CBC | |
| Don't Drive Here | 2013–2015 | Discovery Channel Canada | |
| Storage Wars Canada | 2013–2015 | OLN | co-production with FremantleMedia |
| Masterchef Canada | 2014–present | CTV | |
| True North Calling | 2017 | CBC | |
| The Great Canadian Baking Show | 2017–present | CBC | co-production with Love Productions |
| Lost Car Rescue | 2022–present | History Canada | |
| Listing Large | 2023–present | CTV Life Channel | |
