= Radical Sheep Productions =

Canadian production company

- Type: Subsidiary
- Industry: Television production
- Founded: 1985; 41 years ago
- Founder: Robert Mills
- Defunct: 2018; 8 years ago
- Fate: Folded into Boat Rocker Kids & Family
- Headquarters: 310 King Street East, Toronto, Ontario, Canada
- Area served: Worldwide
- Key people: John Leitch (President)
- Parent: Boat Rocker Media (2016–2018)
- Website: radsheep.com at the Wayback Machine (archived January 18, 2017)

Radical Sheep Productions was a Canadian television production company that was owned by Boat Rocker Media and known for producing series including The Next Step, Stella and Sam, and The Big Comfy Couch, the latter a Gemini Award-winning series for preschoolers which produced seven seasons and aired for over ten years on YTV and Treehouse TV in Canada and public television stations in the United States.

Among its early work, Radical Sheep made puppets used in the early 1990s educational video series The Adventures of Ruffus & Andy, which marked early appearances of Ruffus the Dog. Founded in 1985 by Robert Mills, the company also once housed the Sheep Shop, which provided puppet construction and design services until 2002 when it closed its doors and Mills stepped aside from running the company. As president, John Leitch managed the business of Radical Sheep, acting as executive producer for all of Radical Sheep's productions and also overseeing the management and sales of Radical Sheep's properties, both domestic and foreign.

On March 31, 2016, Radical Sheep was acquired by Boat Rocker Media. Two years later in 2018, the company was folded into Boat Rocker Studios.

== Filmography ==
Title	Creator(s)	Year(s)	Co-production with	Network
1990s
The Adventures of Ruffus & Andy		1990–1992	Credit Valley Hospital	Direct-to-video
Ali Baa Baa's Toy Box (pilot)		1991		Unaired
The Big Comfy Couch	Cheryl Wagner	1993–2006	Owl Television (1993–1994); Owl Communications (1994–1995); Tadpole Kids (2002); Amity Entertainment (2006)	YTV (1993–1996); Treehouse TV (2002–2006); PBS (1995–2006)
Ruffus the Dog	Robert Mills	1998–1999	Hunky Dorey Entertainment	YTV
Panda Bear Daycare	Cheryl Wagner; Karen Valleau; Robert Mills	1998	Araneo Belgium	YTV
Amigo & Me	Cheryl Wagner; Robert Mills	1999–2000		CBC
2000s
Just for Laughs Gags	Pierre Girard; Jacques Chevalier	2000	Just for Laughs	TVA; CBC; The Comedy Network; TVOntario (Canada)
Land O' Hands	Robert Mills	2001		Treehouse
Puppets Who Kill	John Pattison	2002–2006	PWK Productions	The Comedy Network
2010s
Stella and Sam	Marie-Louise Gay	2010–2014	Bejuba! Entertainment; Mercury Filmworks	Family Channel
Yup Yups	Matthew Fernandes	2013	Industrial Brothers; Araneo	Family Jr.
The Next Step	Frank Van Keeken	2013–2025	Temple Street Productions; Boat Rocker Studios	Family Channel (2013–2019); CBC Gem (2020); YTV (2022–2025)
Fangbone!	Simon Racioppa; Richard Elliott	2014–2017	Mercury Filmworks (episode 1); Pipeline Studios (episodes 2–26); DHX Media (episodes 2–26)	Family Chrgd (Canada); Disney XD (U.S.); Netflix (online)
Tee and Mo	Dominic Minns	2014–2019	Plug-In Media; Zodiak Kids; Keyframe Animation; Serious Lunch	CBeebies (UK); TVOKids (Canada)
The Bagel and Becky Show	Dave Cooper	2016–2017	Jam Filled Toronto	Teletoon
Ollie! The Boy Who Became What He Ate	Sheena Macrae	2017–2019	Keyframe Animation; Mickey Rogers Media	CBC Kids; Universal Kids

=== Puppet characters ===
- Spirit of the Forest
- Alligator Pie (1991) (television special)
- Canadian Sesame Street
- Polka Dot Shorts
- Ants in Your Pants (1997-2004)
- Noddy
- Zoboomafoo (1999–2001)
- The Longhouse Tales

Commercials

- Petro-Canada
- Zellers
- Sleep-Eze D
- Robaxacet
- Concerned Children's Advertisers (1993)
