= Boat Rocker Studios =

Canadian media company

- Type: Private
- Industry: Media; Entertainment
- Founded: 2003; 23 years ago (Brand only); 2013; 13 years ago (Trading company)
- Founders: David Fortier; Ivan Schneeberg
- Headquarters: 310 King Street East, Toronto, Ontario, M5A 1K6, Canada
- Key people: John Young (CEO)
- Parent: IDJCo
- Divisions: Boat Rocker Kids & Family; Boat Rocker Rights & Brands; Boat Rocker Studios; Boat Rocker Ventures
- Website: www.boatrocker.com

Boat Rocker Studios is a Canadian multinational entertainment company headquartered in Toronto, Ontario. Founded in 2016 by the executives of Temple Street Productions with backing by Fairfax Financial, it holds interests in media production, distribution, brand licensing, and venture capital. Boat Rocker is led by co-executive chairs David Fortier and Ivan Schneeberg and CEO John Young.

From its founding through 2025, the company operated as a public company. In August 2025, Boat Rocker sold its unscripted and children's studios Insight Productions, Jam Filled Entertainment, and Proper Television to Blue Ant Media, Under the agreement, Blue Ant also acquired the existing Boat Rocker Media corporate entity in a reverse takeover, with the remainder of Boat Rocker being sold back to its management and continuing as a private company.

== History ==
Boat Rocker Studios was first established by Temple Street Productions in June 2013 as its digital studio.

In February 2016, after Fairfax Financial made a majority investment in Temple Street, the company announced a restructuring that would establish a new publicly traded parent company known as Boat Rocker Media. Temple Street's co-presidents David Fortier and Ivan Schneeberg would serve as co-CEOs of the company, which would consist of five main divisions: Boat Rocker Studios, Boat Rocker Rights (distribution; which was a rebranding of Temple Street Distribution), Boat Rocker Animation, Boat Rocker Brands (intellectual property), and Boat Rocker Ventures. Fortier explained that the restructuring would allow the company to pursue new investments and multi-platform ventures, while Fortier and Scheeberg stated that they aimed to "build a platform for the creation and distribution of world-class content of all kinds, with the same core business and creative philosophies we've had from the start but on a much greater scale."

In March 2016, Boat Rocker Media announced its acquisition of Toronto-based studio Radical Sheep Productions, producer of series such as The Big Comfy Couch and The Next Step.

In August 2016, Boat Rocker Media acquired the Ottawa-based animation studio Jam Filled Entertainment; the company would operate as a subsidiary studio under Boat Rocker's children's and family unit, with its existing management (including president Kyle Mac Dougall, and creative directors Jamie Leclaire and Phil Lafrance) reporting to CEO John Young. Later that month, Boat Rocker acquired the library and distribution arm of unscripted producer Peace Point Entertainment Group, while Jam Filled acquired the assets of Toronto-based 3D animation studio Arc Productions (which had entered receivership the previous month).

In April 2017, Boat Rocker Ventures made a US$8.5 million Series A investment in New York-based edutainment software company MarcoPolo Learning. The investment also included a strategic partnership with Boat Rocker Studios to co-develop television and digital content based on MarcoPolo's characters. In May 2017, Boat Rocker Studios announced that it would merge its factual and unscripted operations into a new unit known as Crooked Horse Productions; the Temple Street Productions label would focus solely on scripted productions from then on.

In September 2017, Boat Rocker Media acquired the Toronto-based unscripted production studio Proper Television—producer of series such as Canada's Worst Driver, MasterChef Canada, and Vegas Rat Rods among others following the death of the latter's founder and president Guy O'Sullivan. The acquisition included Proper Television's distribution division Proper Rights, which had been merged into Boat Rocker's distribution division Boat Rocker Rights.

In January 2018, Boat Rocker Rights acquired the Kids & Family Entertainment division of FremantleMedia, including the children's television library of Thames Television; the company divested the library to focus more on its other core entertainment divisions. In May 2018, Boat Rocker acquired a 70% majority stake in Toronto-based Insight Productions; the company would continue to operate independently. In November 2018, Boat Rocker acquired the New York and Los Angeles-based unscripted studio Matador Content, marking its first foray into the American market. It also made an investment in the Toronto Arrows of Major League Rugby. The following month, Boat Rocker's distribution and brands units were brought under the Studios unit led by Jon Rutherford.

In March 2019, Boat Rocker invested in the talent management and production company Untitled Entertainment. In September 2019, Boat Rocker acquired Platform One Media, a Los Angeles-based studio founded by Orphan Black executive producer Katie O’Connell. In October 2019, the company signed a first-look deal with Dakota Johnson's TeaTime Pictures. In November 2020, Platform One Media signed a first-look deal with Lena Headey's Peephole Productions.

On December 8, 2020, Platform One Media was renamed Boat Rocker Studios, Scripted, with Katie O’Connell Marsh being promoted to vice-chairwoman of Boat Rocker Studios. In addition, Matador Content co-founder Jay Peterson was promoted to head of Boat Rocker Studios, Unscripted, with his partner Todd Lubin succeeding him as head of Matador Content. Shortly afterward on December 18, Temple Street Productions was closed and folded into Boat Rocker Studios, Scripted.

In March 2021, Boat Rocker announced a new unscripted studio known as Maven with former ITV Studios America executive Jessica Sebastian-Dayeh, focusing on "female-led narratives and emerging voices". On December 20, 2021, Boat Rocker acquired a minority stake in TeaTime Pictures, with Dakota Johnson transitioning to an overall deal.

In March 2022, as part of a reorganization, Boat Rocker merged its unscripted division into the Los Angeles-based scripted division. Steve Lescroart and Jay Peterson would remain head of scripted and unscripted respectively, with Lescroart additionally named chief operating officer of the unit. In August 2023, Peterson stepped down as president of unscripted in favour of Todd Lubin. In August 2024, Boat Rocker acquired the remaining 30% share of Insight Productions that it did not already own.

On March 24, 2025, Blue Ant Media (which shares Fairfax as an investor) announced its intent to acquire Insight Productions, Jam Filled Entertainment, and Proper Television from Boat Rocker to expand its unscripted and children's divisions. The deal was structured as a reverse takeover, with Boat Rocker Media renamed Blue Ant Media Corporation, and Boat Rocker shareholders holding a 26.5% stake in the company. The remainder of Boat Rocker Media's assets were sold to its management for $18 million via IDJCo, becoming a private company led by Boat Rocker's lead executive team.. Both transactions were completed on August 1, 2025.

On August 21, 2025, Boat Rocker Studios acquired a majority stake in Toronto-based animation studio Industrial Brothers; the company had already held a minority stake in Industrial Brothers as part of a first-look co-production deal.

== Units ==
- Boat Rocker Brands
- Boat Rocker Rights
- Boat Rocker Ventures
- Boat Rocker Studios
  - Matador Content
  - Maven
- Boat Rocker Studios, Kids and Family
  - Industrial Brothers (majority stake)

=== Former assets ===
- Insight Productions
- Jam Filled Entertainment
- Proper Television
- Radical Sheep Productions
- Temple Street Productions

=== Boat Rocker Rights ===
Boat Rocker Rights (formerly known as Temple Street Distribution) is the global distribution, licensing & management division of Boat Rocker Media that handles distribution to Boat Rocker's catalogue worldwide including third-party programming.

==== History ====
Boat Rocker Rights first began its operations on August 27, 2015, when Boat Rocker Media's predecessor-turned subsidiary Temple Street Productions launched its in-house distribution division called Temple Street Distribution with former Tricon executive Jon Rutherford heading the distribution arm as president.

When Temple Street Productions was reorganised into a new company called Boat Rocker Media and following the rebranding of Temple Street Distribution to Boat Rocker Rights, the rebranded division of the new company secured its first outside distribution deal was the acquisition of international rights to Steve Rotfeld Productions' Xploration Station programs in late-February 2016.

Four months later in June of that same year, Boat Rocker Rights had brought global distribution rights to the Mountain Road Productions library such as Broken House Chronicles and Design U, with Boat Rocker Rights reached a first-look deal with the Ottawa-based production outfit to co-produce & distribute Mountain Road's future programming globally.

== Filmography ==
=== Television ===
| Title | Years | Network | Notes |
|---|---|---|---|
| The Next Step | 2013–2025 | Family Channel/CBC Gem/YTV; CBBC (United Kingdom) | inherited from Temple Street Productions and Radical Sheep Productions co-production with Cicada Films (season 1–3) and Beachwood Canyon Productions (season 4) |
| Danger Mouse | 2015–2019 | CBBC | inherited from FremantleMedia Kids & Family co-production with BBC Children's Productions and Boulder Media |
| Ollie! The Boy Who Became What He Ate | 2017–2019 | CBC | co-production with Radical Sheep Productions, Keyframe Animation and Mickey Rogers Media |
| Heavy Lifters | 2017 | Historia & AMI-tv | co-production with Mountain Road Productions |
| Late Nite Eats | 2017–18 | Cooking Channel | co-production with Crooked Horse |
| Last Stop Garage | 2017–2019 | Discovery Channel Canada; Discovery Channel (United States) | co-production with Proper Television |
| Bitz & Bob | 2018–2020 | CBeebies | inherited from FremantleMedia Kids & Family co-production with BBC Children's Productions |
| Vintage Tech Hunters | 2018 | Discovery Channel Canada | co-production with Crooked Horse |
| The Polos | 2019 | YouTube | co-production with Radical Sheep Productions, MarcoPolo Learning and Jam Filled Entertainment |
| Cavendish | 2019–2020 | CBC | co-production with Temple Street Productions, Holdfast Pictures, Bridge Burner Entertainment and Somebody Stop Productions |
| Kingdom Force | 2019–2020 | CBC | co-production with Industrial Brothers and Jam Filled Entertainment |
| Love Monster | 2020–2022 | CBeebies | co-production with BBC Children's Productions, UYoung, A Productions and Karrot Animation |
| Remy & Boo | 2020 | CBC; Universal Kids (United States) | co-production with Industrial Brothers |
| Dino Ranch | 2021–2024 | CBC; Disney Jr. (United States) | co-production with Industrial Brothers and Jam Filled Entertainment |
| American Rust | 2021–2024 | Showtime/Amazon Prime Video | co-production with SouthSlope Studios |
| A Tale Dark & Grimm | 2021 | Netflix | co-production with Netflix Animation, Novo Media Group, Astro-Nomical Entertainment |
| Invasion | 2021–present | Apple TV+ | co-production with Apple Studios and Kinberg Genre |
| Amber Brown | 2022 | Apple TV+ | co-production with Bob & Alice Productions |
| Daniel Spellbound | 2022–2023 | Netflix | co-production with Industrial Brothers |
| Cook At All Costs | 2022 | Netflix | co-production with Insight Productions and Eureka Productions; Owned by Blue Ant Rights |
| Slip | 2023 | The Roku Channel | co-production with Teatime Pictures and Gita |
| Robyn Hood | 2023 | Global | co-production with Eleventh Hour Films and Luti Media |
| Listing Large | 2023–present | CTV Life Channel | co-production with Proper Television; Owned by Blue Ant Rights |
| Beacon 23 | 2023–2024 | MGM+ | co-production with MGM+ Studios, Peephole Productions and Studio 8 |
| Palm Royale | 2024–2026 | Apple TV+ | co-production with Apple Studios, Jaywalker Pictures, Aunt Sylvia's Moving Picture Co., Wyolah Entertainment and Inkshares; Originally titled Mrs. American Pie |
| Geek Girl | 2024–present | Netflix | Took over production & distribution from Nelvana and Aircraft Pictures; co-production with RubyRock Pictures |
| Orphan Black: Echoes | 2024 | AMC | co-production with AMC Studios and You Say Potato |
| Video Nasty | 2025 | BBC Three; Virgin Media One (Ireland); WDR (Germany) | co-production with Deadpan Pictures |
| Bet | 2025–present | Netflix | co-production with RDF |
| Mix Tape | 2025 | Binge | co-production with Aquarius Films and Subotica |
| Sneaker Wars: Adidas V. Puma | 2025 | Disney+ | co-production with Matador Content and Studio 99 |
| The Ridge | 2025–present | BBC Two; Sky Open (New Zealand) | co-production with Great Southern Television and Sinner Films |
| Dino Ranch: Island Explorers | 2025–present | CBC Kids | co-production with Industrial Brothers and Jam Filled Entertainment |
| The Next Step: Cheer | 2026–present | CBBC | A spin-off to The Next Step |
| All Heart: A Rugby Story | 2026 | Crave | Originally titled All Heart: Canada Women's Rugby and the Quest for Rugby World Cup Glory; co-production with Rugby Canada and World Rugby |
| Screech Owls: Animated | Fall 2027 | CBC Television (English); Radio-Canada & TFO (French) | co-production with Shaftesbury, Sphere Animation and National Hockey League |
| Nano Runners | TBA | TBA | co-production with Industrial Brothers |

=== Films ===
| Title | Release date | Distributor | Notes |
|---|---|---|---|
| Billie Eilish: The World's a Little Blurry | February 26, 2021 | Apple TV+ | co-production with Matador Content, Neon, Interscope Films, This Machine Filmworks, Lighthouse Management & Media and The Darkroom |
| War Game | August 2, 2024 | Submarine Deluxe | co-production with Matador Content, Anonymous Content, Quaker Motion Pictures and The Littlefield Company |
| The Merchants of Joy | December 1, 2025 | Amazon Prime Video | co-production with Amazon MGM Studios, Artists Equity, Dial Tone Films and Epic |

==== Upcoming ====
| Title | Co-production with | Client | Notes | Ref. |
|---|---|---|---|---|
| Mating Season | Matador Content | Discovery Channel | | |
| Who Wants to Be an Astronaut? | Matador Content | Discovery Channel | | |
| Scary Stories for Young Foxes | Peephole Productions | | | |
| Bad Kitty | | | | |

== Industrial Brothers ==
Industrial Brothers is a Toronto-based animation production studio that produced animated series and interactive content was founded in 2010 by Arthur Spanos and Matthew Fernandes.

In December 2015, Temple Street Productions acquired a minority stake in the animation studio, given Temple Street its own animation production studio.

=== Filmography ===
| Title | Years | Network | Notes |
|---|---|---|---|
| Yup Yups | 2013 | Disney Junior Canada | co-production with Radical Sheep Productions |
| Dot. | 2016–2018 | CBC | co-production with The Jim Henson Company |
| Top Wing | 2017–2020 | Treehouse TV | co-production with 9 Story Media Group |
| Kingdom Force | 2019–2020 | CBC | co-production with Boat Rocker Studios and Jam Filled Entertainment |
| Remy & Boo | 2020 | CBC; Universal Kids (United States) | co-production with Boat Rocker Studios |
| Dino Ranch | 2021–2024 | CBC; Disney Jr. (United States) | co-production with Boat Rocker Studios and Jam Filled Entertainment |
| Daniel Spellbound | 2022–2023 | Netflix | co-production with Boat Rocker Studios |
| Dino Ranch: Island Explorers | 2025–present | CBC Kids | co-production with Boat Rocker Studios and Jam Filled Entertainment |
