= Periscope Pictures =

- Industry: Entertainment
- Founded: March 2010; 16 years ago
- Founder: Cheryl Wagner; Harmony Wagner
- Headquarters: 42 Upper Hillsborough Street; Charlottetown, Prince Edward Island; C1A 4X3

Periscope Pictures is a Canadian production company, based in Charlottetown, Prince Edward Island. Founded by producers/writers Cheryl Wagner, the creator of The Big Comfy Couch and Harmony Wagner in March 2010, Periscope Pictures creates screen-based entertainment.

== Productions ==
=== Web series ===
Periscope Pictures' first venture is the 15-episode preschool web series Bunny Bop!, launched February 3, 2011. It is one of the first series to be produced with financial participation of the Independent Production Fund – Pilot Web Drama Fund.

==== Short films ====
Vast written, directed and produced by Harmony Wagner, finds a young teen waking up to discover he seems to be the last person on earth. Vast was voted Viewer's Choice at the 2011 Island Media Arts Festival in Charlottetown. Vast is Harmony Wagner's first effort as a director.

Lucky 7 written and directed by Jason Rogerson and produced by Harmony Wagner, is a comedy about an office lotto pool tragedy. Lucky 7 is the winner of the 2010 CBC 321 Award for PEI.
