= Dino Ranch: Island Explorers =

Canadian animated TV series

- Created by: Matthew Fernandes
- Based on: Dino Ranch
- Country of origin: Canada
- Original language: English
- No. of seasons: 1
- No. of episodes: 26 (52 segments)

Production
- Production companies: Industrial Brothers; Boat Rocker Studios

Original release
- Network: CBC Kids
- Release: November 8, 2025 – present

Dino Ranch: Island Explorers is a Canadian animated children's television series created by Matthew Fernandes. The series is co-produced by both Industrial Brothers and Boat Rocker Studios, and animated by Jam Filled Entertainment. The series aired on November 8, 2025.

A spin-off of Dino Ranch, the show follows the Cassidy Clan as they travel to Dino Island, where their uncle Jack Cassidy lives. The first season will consist of twenty-six episodes, with two segments per each.

== Episodes ==
No. overall	No. in season	Title	Written by	Original release date
1	1	"Jon and the Giant Croc"	Meghan Read	November 8, 2025
1	1	"Miguel and the Smooth-a-tron"	Stephanie Kaliner	November 8, 2025
The Junior Ranchers arrive on Dino Island to meet Uncle Jack, but Jon struggles to fit in; Miguel joins Jon on a daring mission to feed a baby quetzalcoatlus and learns his true bravery.
2	2	"Clara and the Giant Ants"	Sean Jara	November 15, 2025
2	2	"Enter the Dragonflies"	Ben Joseph	November 15, 2025
The Ranchers and Atticus must rescue Clara from a colony of giant fire ants inside a volcano; Jon and Clara form a reluctant team to chase Dragonflies that snatched their yum-yum plums.
3	3	"Clover and the Copycat"	Meghan Read	November 22, 2025
3	3	"A Sticky Situation"	Stephanie Kaliner	November 22, 2025
Min and Miguel save a pterosaur nest from a volcano, upsetting a T-Rex who misses their songs; Jon tries to prove he's a great explorer like Uncle Jack; he learns teamwork goes farther.
4	4	"Clara and the Baby Croc"	Sean Jara	November 29, 2025
4	4	"Treasure Trouble"	Naomi Jardine	November 29, 2025
Jon and the team search for Clara, who mistakenly took a baby croc from its mother; the Ranchers discover treasure that already belongs to a huge, toothy underwater creature.
5	5	"Compy Chaos"	Craig Martin	December 13, 2025
5	5	"Enter Thunderfin"	Craig Martin	December 13, 2025
Uncle Jack's Dino Den opening is interrupted by three mischievous compys and an angry Big Rex; during an undersea test drive, the Ranchers must save an egg from the mighty Thunderfin.
6	6	"Min the Expert"	Stephanie Kaliner	December 27, 2025
6	6	"Turtle Trouble"	Sean Jara	December 27, 2025
Min learns to ask for help while caring for dinosaur patients; Jon and Miguel protect baby turtles as Min treats their injured mother.
6	6	"Miguel's Very Bad No Good Day"	Craig Martin	January 24, 2026
6	6	"Min and the Sleepy Dino"	Meghan Read	January 24, 2026
Miguel and Tango face their fears to save friends from rising lava in the jungle./Min and Uncle Jack search underwater for a special flower to calm an injured dino.
7	7	"The Dino Boss"	Craig Martin	February 28, 2026
7	7	"Big Baby Rescue"	Meghan Read	February 28, 2026

== Production ==
In November 2024, it was announced that Boat Rocker, who produced the original series, had ordered a spin-off to Dino Ranch, which would follow the original characters traveling to the exotic Dino Island. The series was shown at MIPCOM in 2025.

== Release ==
At MIPCOM in 2025, it was reported that the series would release in late 2025, and that it will consist of 52 11-minute episode segments. The series was previously set to be released in 2026.

The series will stream on Amazon Kids+ in several different countries. In Canada, CBC is set to air the series, and aside from television, it is also planned to stream on CBC Gem, as well as Ici TOU.TV. It is also reported that Ici Radio-Canada Télé will broadcast it. In Africa and the Middle East, the series will air on Cartoonito.
