= Kingdom Force =

Canadian animated television series

- Genre: Superhero; Science fantasy; Action-adventure
- Created by: Matthew Fernandes
- Directed by: Chad Hicks; Michael Helmer
- Voices of: Bobby Knauff; Tyler Nathan; Mark Edwards; Julie Sype; Dwayne Hill; Jane Spence
- Music by: Lorenzo Castelli
- Country of origin: Canada
- Original language: English
- No. of episodes: 26

Production
- Executive producers: Arthur Spanos; Matthew Fernandes; Tammy Semen; Bob Higgins; David Fortier; Ivan Schneeberg
- Producer: Heather Wilson
- Animators: Ian Stonebridge; Ryan Carr; Karina Gelencser; Tyler Wescott
- Running time: 22 minutes
- Production companies: Industrial Brothers; Boat Rocker Studios; Jam Filled Entertainment

Original release
- Network: CBC Kids; Radio-Canada
- Release: December 7, 2019 – September 9, 2020

Kingdom Force is a 2019-2020 Canadian animated children's television series created by Matthew Fernandes. The series is about the adventures of an animal superhero team. Summoned from five different kingdoms, the heroes pilot five rescue vehicles which combine to form a giant robot—the Alpha Mech.

== Characters ==
=== Main ===
==== Luka ====
Voiced by Bobby Knauff. A fearless wolf from the Forest Kingdom, Luka is the team's leader. He pilots the Kingdom Rider 1, a red aerial gyro which forms the head and torso of the Alpha-Mech.

==== Jabari ====
Voiced by Tyler Nathan. The youngest member of the team, Jabari is a cheetah from the Plains Kingdom. He drives the Kingdom Rider 2, a yellow speed vehicle which forms the left leg of the Alpha-Mech.

==== TJ ====
Voiced by Mark Edwards. A badger from the underground dwellings of the Canyon Kingdom, TJ is the team analyst. He drives the Kingdom Rider 3, a green digging machine which forms the right leg of the Alpha-Mech.

==== Dalilah ====
Voiced by Julie Sype. The brains and sole female of the team, Dalilah is a gorilla from the Jungle Kingdom. She drives the Kingdom Rider 4, an orange crawler which forms the right arm of the Alpha-Mech.

==== Norvyn ====
Voiced by Dwayne Hill. Norvyn is a polar bear from the Ice Kingdom, and serves as the team's muscle. He drives the Kingdom Rider 5, a blue snowplow and submarine which forms the left arm of the Alpha-Mech.

==== Sprocket ====
Voiced by Jane Spence. Sprocket is a koala who designs the technology used by the team. She is in a high-tech wheelchair which has flight capabilities.

=== Recurring ===
==== Mayor Honeyclaw ====
Voiced by Jeff Lumby. A brown honey bear and the spokesperson of the Council at the Anopolis, Mayor Honeyclaw is a representative of the bears of the Ice Kingdom.

==== King Cat ====
Voiced by Rob Tinkler. A laid-back, easy-going lion from the Plains Kingdom, King Cat is the head of the cats and one of the Council Members at the Anapolis.

==== Professor Dunbit ====
Voiced by Brad Adamson. An orangutan from the Jungle Kingdom, Professor Dunbit is a scientist and inventor and represents the apes at the Anapolis.

==== Hoover ====
Voiced by Wyatt White. A blue gorilla from the Jungle Kingdom, Hoover is a close friend of Professor Dunbit and often assists with the Professor's experiments.

==== Liberty Longtail ====
Voiced by Katie Griffin. An arctic wolf from the Forest Kingdom, Liberty is a news reporter for the Five Kingdoms. With her camera operator Willow, she is often looking for the next big story.

==== Mittens McGuirk ====
Voiced by Megan Fahlenbock. Originally meant to be part of Kingdom Force, her sidekick Jabari was a last-minute replacement when Mittens refused to join.

==== Jalopi ====
Voiced by Samantha Weinstein. A mandrill from the Jungle Kingdom, Jalopi is a big fan of Kingdom Force. She really wants to be a hero, but often makes mistakes and inadvertently causes trouble for the team. She drives a recycling truck (which she calls her "Jalopoimobile") and has a pink doll named Binky.

=== Antagonists ===
==== Dr. Sabre ====
Voiced by Dwayne Hill. A small Persian cat and the evil CEO of Kittycorp Industries, Dr. Sabre is the most frequently recurring villain in the series. He often schemes to boost his company's sales or simply for self-pleasure, but often than not his schemes result in failure. Dr. Sabre has two grizzly bears, Gunter and Gustav (voiced by Mark Edwards), who serve under him.

==== Envie Fernandez ====
Voiced by Nicki Burke. A devious silver fox bandit from the Forest Kingdom, Envie lives up to her name. Despite owning a fancy car and having advanced spy gadgetry at her disposal, she always seeks to pilfer what isn't hers.

==== Max Volume ====
Voiced by Danny Smith. A honey badger from the Canyon Kingdom, Max is a renegade rock-and-roll player who was exiled when his music caused underground cave-ins. He always seeks an audience for his "concerts", but no one likes his loud music - especially the badgers.

==== Funbit 9000 ====
Funbit is a robotic virtual pet created by Professor Dunbit, originally designed to interact with technology. After having juice spilled on it, Funbit goes rogue and now infects any technology it can access. Funbit considers Jabari to be its best friend, since he volunteered to look after it.

== Episodes ==
No.	Title	Directed by	Written by	Storyboard by	Original release date
1	"Origins"	Chad Hicks	Craig Martin	Steve Remen (Part 1); Brad Cayford (Part 2)	December 7, 2019
After a series of natural disasters threatens the Five Kingdoms, a group of champions must learn to work together to save the kingdoms before it is too late.
2a	"Runaway Train"	Chad Hicks	Scott Albert	Chris Land	December 14, 2019
Kingdom Force must rescue Hoover and Professor Dunbit from a speeding train before it crashes.
2b	"Forecast Chaos"	Chad Hicks	Craig Martin	Marko Bajic	December 14, 2019
Jabari accidentally sends a weather drone into overdrive, causing extreme weather shifts to endanger the Five Kingdoms.
3a	"Fire on Wolf Mountain"	Chad Hicks	Scott Albert	Steve Remen	December 21, 2019
While communities argue over ownership of a new bridge, Kingdom Force must work to save some Camper Cubs from a raging forest fire.
3b	"Go with the Floe"	Chad Hicks	Craig Martin	Sean Janisse	December 21, 2019
Kingdom Force must save a family of bears from going Titanic after Jalopi sets them adrift on an ice floe.
4a	"Sinkhole or Swim"	Chad Hicks	Ben Joseph	Chris Land and Brian Wong	December 28, 2019
Kingdom Force is called to fix a sinkhole at the Anopolis, but run into trouble when Liberty Longtail, Willow, and Luka get stuck inside of it.
4b	"Drop it Like it's Hot"	Chad Hicks	Scott Albert	Jeff Amey	December 28, 2019
Kingdom Force has to evacuate and save the citizens of Black Rock Village from an erupting volcano.
5a	"Danger in Grizzly Valley"	Chad Hicks	Alan Gregg	Steve Remen	January 4, 2020
Kingdom Force has to reconcile the feuding Bear and Badger communities, while also saving the Bear citizens from a collapsing dam.
5b	"Gondola with the Wind"	Chad Hicks	Craig Martin	Brad Cayford	January 4, 2020
Kingdom Force must save a gondola full of bears, and are surprised when Rider 5 arrives with Norvyn's nephew at the helm.
6a	"Bee Yourself"	Chad Hicks	Ben Joseph	Brian Wong	January 11, 2020
Kingdom Force transports honey bees between kingdoms to save an endangered flower.
6b	"Creepy Crawlers"	Chad Hicks	Craig Martin	David Thomas	January 11, 2020
Sprocket decides to take the day off, but she can't rest when Dr. Sabre has stolen the Crawler.
7a	"We Be Jammin'"	Chad Hicks	Craig Martin	Brian Wong	January 18, 2020
Dr. Sabre's new harvesting machine is picking the Jungle Kingdom orchard clean of Banana Squash.
7b	"Dog Daze"	Chad Hicks	Craig Martin	Jeremy Bondy	January 18, 2020
Luka seeks King Cat's help in learning how to relax.
8a	"Can You Dig It?"	Chad Hicks	Craig Martin	Steve Remen	January 25, 2020
A cave-in traps the badger community underground, but how can Kingdom Force set them free when they're trapped alongside them?
8b	"Howl-o-Ween"	Chad Hicks	Phil Ivanusic	Brad Cayford	January 25, 2020
Jabari uses a glowing serum to make his pumpkin spookier for the Howl-o-ween festival, but the side effects are scarier than he could ever imagine.
9a	"Funbit 9000"	Chad Hicks	Craig Martin	Brian Wong	February 1, 2020
When Professor Dunbit's latest invention malfunctions, it's up to Kingdom Force to save themselves from the Crawler.
9b	"Iron Ape"	Chad Hicks	Amy Brown	Brad Cayford	February 1, 2020
A fit of jealousy beckons Dalilah to abandon her post guarding the coveted banana crown, giving Envie Fernandez a chance to steal it.
10a	"Ruin of Zoom"	Chad Hicks	Ben Joseph	Steve Remen	February 8, 2020
While exploring an ancient temple, Liberty Longtail and Professor Dunbit end up getting trapped inside.
10b	"Night Birds"	Chad Hicks	Craig Martin	Brad Cayford	February 8, 2020
During the annual Night Bird ceremony, Envie Fernandez crashes the party by making off with the cherished night birds.
11a	"Mad Max Volume"	Chad Hicks & Michael Helmer	Sean Jara	Steve Remen	February 15, 2020
Kingdom Force tries to rescue some frightened felines after Max Volume hijacks the Rocket Train.
11b	"Big Cat Blues"	Chad Hicks	Alex Ganetakos	Brian Wong	February 15, 2020
The team attempts stop an oversized statue of Jabari after Funbit 9000 takes possession of it and wants to play.
12a	"Stink 'Em Up"	Chad Hicks & Michael Helmer	Phil Ivanusic	Ian Westoby	February 22, 2020
Dr. Sabre releases Stink Cactus spores across the Five Kingdoms.
12b	"The Night Beast of Gorilla Gulch"	Chad Hicks & Michael Helmer	Craig Martin	Brad Cayford	February 22, 2020
Kingdom Force receives a call about a mysterious night beast haunting the Jungle Kingdom.
13a	"Free Prize in Every Box"	Chad Hicks & Michael Helmer	Grant Suave	Steve Remen and Jeff Tran	February 29, 2020
A new cereal craze has the Five Kingdoms in a frenzy searching for the prized golden toy.
13b	"Sloppy Jalopi"	Chad Hicks & Michael Helmer	Craig Martin	Brad Cayford	February 29, 2020
Kingdom Force must chase down Funbit 9000, who has taken over the Jalopimobile with Jalopi and Liberty Longtail inside.
14a	"Full Moon Fever"	Chad Hicks & Michael Helmer	Craig Martin	Ian Westoby	April 4, 2020
When the Camper Cubs end up drifting away on a hot air balloon, Luka must control his urge to howl on the night of the Fire Moon.
14b	"Super Jalopi!"	Chad Hicks & Michael Helmer	Dan Smith	Steve Remen	April 4, 2020
When Jalopi tries on Dr. Sabre's energy belt, she seizes the opportunity to steal the spotlight from Kingdom Force.
15a	"Hello Dolly"	Chad Hicks & Michael Helmer	Ben Joseph	Brad Cayford	April 11, 2020
The Rock Guardian has set its sights on Jalopi's doll, and will let nothing stand between the two of them.
15b	"Say Yes to the Mess"	Chad Hicks & Michael Helmer	Evan Thaler Hickey	Ian Westoby	April 11, 2020
TJ creates a robotic vacuum cleaner to help clean up messes, but the machine soon gets out of control.
16a	"Snowballs of Fury"	Chad Hicks & Michael Helmer	Craig Martin	Jeremy Bondy	May 2, 2020
Artie decides to take drastic measures to beat Jabari at his own game and stop his bragging.
16b	"Cat Me if You Can"	Chad Hicks & Michael Helmer	Jocelyn Geddie	Brad Cayford	May 2, 2020
Jabari's solo mission is thwarted after Mittens McGuirk intervenes and accidentally lets Gunter and Gustav steal Jabari's crystal cargo.
17a	"Ready, Set, Slow!"	Chad Hicks & Michael Helmer	Scott McGuirk	Steve Remen	May 16, 2020
Envie Fernandez is quick to steal Professor Dunbit's slo-mo ray, and Kingdom Force needs to get it back.
17b	"Ground Breakin', Earth Shakin', No Fakin'"	Chad Hicks & Michael Helmer	Evan Thaler Hickey	Brad Cayford	May 16, 2020
Luka is annoyed after Max Volume repeatedly cries wolf, which could lead to trouble when the threat is real.
18a	"Control Yourself"	Chad Hicks & Michael Helmer	Ben Joseph	Ian Westoby	May 30, 2020
Max Volume hypnotizes the badger community to do his bidding, leaving no badger unaffected...including TJ!
18b	"Codes of Trouble"	Chad Hicks & Michael Helmer	Craig Martin	Steve Remen	May 30, 2020
When Professor Dunbit's crystal-mining robots go haywire, Kingdom Force must shut them down before they destroy the Jungle Kingdom.
19a	"Chill or Be Chilled"	Chad Hicks & Michael Helmer	Evan Thaler Hickey	Jeremy Bondy	June 13, 2020
Kingdom Force defends a Bear Village from an Ice Monster, but this newly discovered creature might not be the enemy.
19b	"Gimme a Break"	Chad Hicks & Michael Helmer	Craig Martin	Brad Cayford	June 13, 2020
Jalopi finally forms her own super-team full of Jalopi clones.
20a	"Under Pressure"	Chad Hicks & Michael Helmer	Grant Suavé	Steve Remen	June 27, 2020
Jabari resigns his Kingdom Force spot to legendary hero Mittens McGuirk, and it's a test of true teamwork to save the Plains Kingdom from devastating geysers.
20b	"License to Drill"	Chad Hicks & Michael Helmer	Ben Joseph	Jeremy Bondy	June 27, 2020
TJ is irked when he's told to train the other Kingdom Force members how to use his vehicle.
21a	"Norvyn Not-So-Big"	Chad Hicks & Michael Helmer	Craig Martin	Ian Westoby	July 11, 2020
Big problems follow the team after a shrink ray zaps everything in sight.
21b	"Skate Expectations"	Chad Hicks & Michael Helmer	Caitlin Langelier	Jeremy Bondy	July 11, 2020
Luka is too embarrassed to admit that he doesn't know how to ride on a skateboard until Max Volume wreaks havoc in the Canyon Kingdom.
22a	"Moustivus"	Chad Hicks & Michael Helmer	Scott McGuirk	Steve Remen	July 25, 2020
When Jabari takes a practical joke too far and pranks Dr. Sabre on TV, it's the Plains Kingdom who'll end up paying the price.
22b	"Outfoxed"	Chad Hicks & Michael Helmer	Craig Martin	Brad Cayford	July 25, 2020
Envie Fernandez has her eyes on King Cat's crown, and only Sprocket can keep her from getting it.
23a	"Burden of Tooth"	Chad Hicks & Michael Helmer	Evan Thaler Hickey	Ian Westoby	August 8, 2020
An actual tornado wreaks havoc on Max Volume's latest music video shoot.
23b	"Alpha-Magnet"	Chad Hicks & Michael Helmer	Evan Thaler Hickey	Ian Westoby	August 8, 2020
Jalopi's feelings are hurt after she overhears Dalilah talking about her behind her back.
24a	"Fleas and Thank You"	Chad Hicks & Michael Helmer	Evan Thaler Hickey	Jeremy Bondy	August 22, 2020
Sprocket sends Kingdom Force on a treasure hunting training mission, but Envie is itching to get the treasure for herself! How can they stop her even when they have fleas?
24b	"Cold Comfort"	Chad Hicks & Michael Helmer	Scott McGuirk	Brad Cayford	August 22, 2020
Hoover feels ignored by Kingdom Force and agrees to help Dr. Sabre, but regrets his decision when the Cold-erpillar puts the Alpha-Mech on ice.
25a	"Growing, Growing, Gone"	Chad Hicks & Michael Helmer	Craig Martin	Ian Westoby	August 29, 2020
Dr. Sabre wreaks havoc after using Dalilah's Grow-Grow Potion to become a giant.
25b	"Ain’t No Level High Enough"	Chad Hicks & Michael Helmer	Caitlin Langelier	Jeremy Bondy	August 29, 2020
Dunbit and Hoover are trapped atop Polar Peak Mountain in a snowstorm.
26a	"See Cat Run"	Chad Hicks & Michael Helmer	Amy Brown and Craig Martin	Steve Remen	September 9, 2020
Envie Fernandez disguises herself and steals Mayor Honeyclaw's key in an attempt to get her paws on the treasury.
26b	"Throw Norvyn from the Train"	Chad Hicks & Michael Helmer	Craig Martin	Ian Westoby	September 9, 2020
When Funbit possesses a rocket train, Artie ends up trapped inside.

== Release ==
Kingdom Force first Premiered on CBC Television in 2020 as part of its CBC Kids block. Later in 2020, It premiered on Boomerang in the United Kingdom. In 2023 it premiered on Sonshine Media Network International and reruns in August 3, 2024 on All TV in the Philippines.
