= Cement Heads =

- Genre: Reality
- Starring: the Lougheed family
- Country of origin: United States
- Original language: English
- No. of seasons: 1
- No. of episodes: 10

Production
- Running time: 21–22 minutes
- Production company: Matador Content

Original release
- Network: A&E
- Release: August 12 – September 20, 2014

Cement Heads is an American reality television series airing on A&E. The series premiered on August 12, 2014, and stars the Lougheed family, cement contractors in New York City. It is produced by Matador Content.

The series centers on the misadventures of a family-run business. One distinctive aspect of the program is that the fourth wall is frequently broken as the Lougheed family interacts with the producers and crew.
