= Scourge of Worlds: A Dungeons & Dragons Adventure =

DVD cover

Scourge of Worlds: A Dungeons & Dragons Adventure is an animated film or interactive adventure. It was released in 2003.

== Overview ==
In each scene, it allows the user a choice, and different endings or different paths to the same ending will be displayed depending upon that choice. The film contains twenty "decision points" throughout its runtime. It continued the tradition of 'Choose Your Own Adventure' novels, using a D&D theme and storyline. The film had "right" ending and, if the viewer selected incorrect options, they would be met with a screen stating "your path ends here."

== Production ==
The film was directed by Dan Krech. It was released by Rhino Theatrical on June 10, 2003, after being developed by DKP Effects. A collectors edition was released later in 2003 which contained a figurine and behind-the-scenes features.

== Reception ==
The film received mixed reception from critics. DVD Verdict complimented the film's humor and the animation but criticized the mostly linear nature of the storyline. Video Business similarly criticized the storyline's linear nature, noting that the DVD did not have a rewind function and instead locked viewers into their choices. Video Store Magazine only recommended the film to "kids who already like the genre."
