= Alex Barima =

Canadian actor (born 1991)

- Born: May 28, 1991 (age 34); Montreal, Quebec, Canada
- Occupation: Actor

Alex Barima (born 28 May 1991) is a Canadian actor, known for his roles in Daniel Spellbound, Schmigadoon! and Resident Alien.

== Early life, education and career ==
Barima was born in Montreal, Canada, to immigrant parents from the Ivory Coast, West Africa. In college, he coached an improvised acting team. He "always wanted to work in film and TV", but his parents didn't initially support his career. He earned a post-secondary theater degree before relocating to Vancouver to continue pursuing his career, where he graduated from the Vancouver Academy of Dramatic Arts.

== Acting credits ==
=== Film ===
Year	Title	Role	Notes
2012	Grave Encounters 2	Dead Michael	as Alex Barmia
2013	If I Had Wings	Mitchell	
2015	Badge of Honor	Victor	
2015	Tomorrowland	Jetpack Buddy	
2016	Barbie & Her Sisters in A Puppy Chase	Marco (voice)	
2017	Adventures in Public School	Wes	
2017	Cypher	Thello	Short film
2018	Day 34	Mal	Short film
2019	Parabola	Lloyd	Short film
2021	Andie the Great	Adam	
2021	Rise and Grind	Alex	Short film

=== Television ===
Year	Title	Role	Notes
2013	Once Upon a Time	Lost Boy #1, Twin #1	2 episodes
2014	Almost Human	Luca	Episode "Straw Man"
2014	Continuum	Nathan	Episode "Waning Minutes"
2014	The Flash	College Boy	Episode "Power Outage"
2015	The Returned	Trace	3 episodes
2016	iZombie	Host	Episode "Reflections of the Way Liv Used to Be"
2016	Tips	Eli	Episode "Welcome to Leftovers"
2016	Legends of Tomorrow	Abraham	Episode "Abominations"
2016	Travelers	Nick	Episode "Protocol 5"
2017	Supernatural	Drexel	3 episodes
2017	The Exorcist	Shelby	10 episodes
2018	Rachel	Jayden	2 episodes
2018	Littlest Pet Shop: A World of Our Own	Chicken, Roget Lapin, Vincent Goldenpup (voices)	2 episodes
2018–2020	The Hollow	Reeve (voice)	11 episodes
2018	Zoids Wild	Bastion (English voice)	3 episodes
2019	Project Blue Book	Gene	Episode "War Games"
2019	The Man in the High Castle	Oscar Watson	5 episodes
2019	Riverdale	Johnathan	12 episodes
2020	The 100	Kwame	Guest, 3 episodes
2020	The Gourmet Detective	Bailey	Episode "Roux the Day"
2020	LEGO Marvel Avengers: Climate Conundrum	James "Rhodey" Rhodes, War Machine (voice)	Mini series, 4 episodes
2021	LEGO Marvel Avengers: Loki in Training	Nick Fury (voice)	Television movie
2021	Schmigadoon!	Freddy	Guest; 2 episodes
2022	Les moments parfaits	Brian	Episode "Biscuit chinois"
2021–2025	Resident Alien	David Logan	19 episodes
2022	Mixed Baggage	Raymond	Television movie
2022–2023	Daniel Spellbound	Daniel Spellbound (voice)	Main cast; 20 episodes
2023	Most Dangerous Game	Monroe	Guest; 2 episodes
2023	Psi Cops	Faith Healer, Christian Dad Guy	Episode "Faith Healer"
2023	Cocomelon Lane	Nico's Dad, Mr. Curly (voice)	5 episodes

=== Video games ===
Year	Title	Role	Notes
2018	Zoids Wild: Blast Unleashed	Bastion (English voice)	
2020	Hyper Scape	Paladin (voice)	

== Awards and nominations ==
Year	Film	Award	Category	Result
2017	Cypher	UBCP/ACTRA Awards	UBCP/Actra Best Actor 2017	Nominated
