= Ruffus the Dog =

- Genre: Children's television series
- Created by: Robert Mills and Cheryl Wagner
- Directed by: Robert Mills
- Starring: Robert Mills; Bob Stutt; Gord Robertson; Fred Stinson; Karen Valleau; Ben Deutsch
- Composer: JP Houston
- Country of origin: Canada
- Original language: English

Production
- Executive producers: Robert Mills; John Leitch
- Producers: Cheryl Wagner; Robert Mills
- Editor: Frank Moressa
- Camera setup: Multi-camera
- Production companies: Radical Sheep Productions; YTV

Original release
- Network: YTV
- Release: September 7 – November 6, 1998

Ruffus the Dog is a Canadian children's television series which aired on YTV from 1998; it was created by Robert Mills, who performs the title character, and developed with Cheryl Wagner. The show was produced through Radical Sheep Productions, a company founded by Mills in 1985 that also created The Big Comfy Couch. The Ruffus character had previously appeared in the educational video series The Adventures of Ruffus & Andy in the early 1990s, as produced by the Credit Valley Hospital in Mississauga, Ontario, where Ruffus and his owner Andy learned medical lessons.

When Robert Mills left Radical Sheep in 2002, ownership and rights to the award-winning series were transferred to his new company, Hunky Dorey Entertainment. In 2010, Mills announced all of the original shows would be posted online under a Creative Commons license, and that they want to produce new episodes for online release. The first major production was a re-telling of the Charles Dickens classic A Christmas Carol with Ruffus playing Ebenezer Scrooge. Six of the show's original puppeteers, Robert Mills, Bob Stutt, Gord Robertson, Fred Stinson, Karen Valleau, and Ben Deutsch, returned for the project, as did songwriter JP Houston. Alyson Court, who played Loonette the Clown on The Big Comfy Couch, voiced the Ghost of Christmas Past.

In 2013, the Ruffus Project planned to develop a web series entitled: Ruffus The Dog's Steampunk Adventure. However, the project, appears to have been scrapped as the official website has since went defunct.

Also in the works were a series of illustrated book titles and a pre-school web series entitled: Ruffus Rhymes. Neither of them got off the ground.

== Synopsis ==
Ruffus the Dog runs a bookshop in a small town. There, he reads a famous fairy tale to the viewers. In the story, Ruffus and several other characters portray different characters in the tale. At the end, he talks about the moral of the story to the viewers.

== Episodes ==
Title	CC BY-NC-SA-2.5 original date
Rapunzel	September 7, 1998
Robin Hood	September 9, 1998
Jack & The Beanstalk	September 11, 1998
Dr. Jekyll & Mr. Hyde	September 14, 1998
The Frog Prince	September 16, 1998
The Brave Little Tailor	September 18, 1998
Around The World In 80 Days	September 21, 1998
The Three Little Pigs	September 23, 1998
Little Red Riding Hood	September 25, 1998
Little Bo Peep	September 28, 1998
Sinbad The Sailor	September 30, 1998
Aladdin & The Magic Lamp	October 2, 1998
Tom Thumb	October 5, 1998
Robinson Crusoe	October 7, 1998
20,000 Leagues Under The Sea	October 9, 1998
The Three Bears	October 12, 1998
The Emperor’s New Clothes	October 14, 1998
The Three Musketeers	October 16, 1998
The Troll Under The Bridge	October 19, 1998
The Pied Piper	October 21, 1998
The Second Voyage Of Sinbad	October 23, 1998
Rip Van Winkle	October 25, 1998
Gulliver’s Travels	October 28, 1998
Hansel & Gretel	October 30, 1998
King Midas	November 1, 1998
Cinderella	November 4, 1998
Ruffus The Dog’s Christmas Carol	November 6, 1998
