= Jam Filled Entertainment =

Canadian animation studio

- Formerly: Jam Filled Toronto: Dan Krech Productions (1985–2000); DKP Effects (2000–2004); DKP Studios (2004–2006); Starz Animation (2006–2011); Arc Productions (2011–2016)
- Type: Subsidiary
- Industry: Harmony; CGI animation
- Founded: March 16, 2007; 19 years ago
- Founders: Kyle MacDougall; Phil Lafrance; Jamie Leclaire
- Headquarters: 65 Auriga Drive, Ottawa, Ontario, Canada
- Parent: Jam Filled Toronto: Starz Media (2004–2011); Jam Filled Entertainment (2016–present); Jam Filled Entertainment: Boat Rocker Media (2016–2025); Blue Ant Media (2025–present)
- Divisions: Jam Filled Toronto; Jam Filled Halifax
- Website: www.jamfilled.com

Jam Filled Entertainment is a Canadian animation studio based in Ottawa, Ontario (with additional facilities in Toronto and Halifax), and is a subsidiary of Blue Ant Media.

The company is known for animating several Nicktoons series such as The Loud House and its spin-off The Casagrandes, and Pinky Malinky, as well as the Cartoon Network series DC Super Hero Girls and Final Space. Its Toronto division, formerly known as Arc Productions and Starz Animation, has worked on CGI films and series such as Chop Socky Chooks, Gnomeo & Juliet, Thomas & Friends, and VeggieTales.

== History ==
Jam Filled Entertainment was founded in Manotick in 2007 by Kyle MacDougall, Phil Lafrance, and Jamie Leclaire. In January 2011, Jam Filled moved to a new location in Ottawa.

On August 3, 2016, Boat Rocker Media acquired Jam Filled Entertainment, with the company maintaining its management as a subsidiary. On August 22, Jam Filled then acquired the assets of Toronto-based Arc Productions out of receivership, reopening the studio as a subsidiary to expand the company into 3D animation.

In September 2019, Jam Filled announced the opening of a new 10,000 square foot studio in Halifax, dedicated to 2D animation projects.

On March 24, 2025, Blue Ant Media announced that it would acquire Jam Filled from Boat Rocker as part of a reverse takeover arrangement. The reverse takeover was completed on August 1, 2025.

== Filmography ==
=== Jam Filled Entertainment ===
==== Television series ====
Title	Year(s)	Notes	Client
Almost Naked Animals	2011–13		9 Story Entertainment
Crash Canyon	2011–13		Breakthrough Entertainment
Camp Lakebottom	2013–14	pre-production to rough-cut; season 1	9 Story Entertainment
The Day My Butt Went Psycho!	2014–15	season 1 episode 20; season 2	Nelvana; Studio Moshi
Numb Chucks	2014–16		9 Story Media Group
The Loud House	2016–present	Animation services	Nickelodeon Animation Studio
Thomas & Friends	2016–21	series 20–24; continued from Arc Productions	HiT Entertainment
The Bagel and Becky Show	2016–17	pre-production to rough-cut	Radical Sheep Productions
Rusty Rivets	2016–20	remaining eps of seasons 1–3; continued from Arc Productions	Spin Master Entertainment
WellieWishers	2017	season 2	Mattel Creations
Kody Kapow	2017		Zodiak Kids
Final Space	2018–21	Animation services	ShadowMachine
Pinky Malinky	2019	Animation services	Nickelodeon Animation Studio
DC Super Hero Girls	2019–20	season 1 and shorts	Warner Bros. Animation
The Polos	2019		Boat Rocker Media
Bubble Guppies	2019–23	seasons 5–6	Nickelodeon Animation Studio
The Casagrandes	2019–22	Animation services	Nickelodeon Animation Studio
Kingdom Force	2019–20		Boat Rocker Media
Dino Ranch	2021–24		Boat Rocker Media
A Tale Dark & Grimm	2021		Boat Rocker Media; Netflix Animation
Inside Job	2021–22	Animation services	Netflix Animation
What If...?	2021	additional effects for season 2; "What If... Iron Man Crashed into the Grandmaster?"	Marvel Studios Animation
Rubble & Crew	2023–present		Spin Master Entertainment
Clone High	2023–24	Animation services; seasons 2–3	ShadowMachine; MTV Entertainment Studios
Praise Petey	2023	Animation services	20th Television Animation
Vida the Vet	2024–present		Spin Master Entertainment
X-Men '97	2024–present	Animation services (season 2); additional effects for "Tolerance Is Extinction: Part 2" and "Tolerance Is Extinction: Part 3"	Marvel Studios Animation
Exploding Kittens	2024	Animation services	Chomp City; Bandera Entertainment; Chernin Entertainment
Wylde Pak	2025–present	Animation services	Nickelodeon Animation Studio
Dino Ranch: Island Explorers	2025–present	Animation services	Boat Rocker Media

==== Specials/shorts ====
Title	Year(s)	Notes	Client
Nickelodeon Animated Shorts Program	2013–18	"The Loud House", "Off the Shelf", "My Friend Pancake", "Robo Wonder Kid", and "Fur-Ever Family"	Nickelodeon Animation Studio
The Snow Ball	2021	short film	
Nickelodeon Intergalactic Shorts Program	2022	"Rock Paper Scissors"	Nickelodeon Animation Studio
Reindeer in Here	2022		CBS Eye Animation Productions

==== Films ====
Title	Year(s)	Notes	Client
Thomas & Friends: Journey Beyond Sodor	2017		Mattel Creations
The Great Northern Candy Drop	2017		Boat Rocker Media
Thomas & Friends: Big World, Big Adventures!	2018		Mattel Creations
We Lost Our Human	2023		Netflix Animation
No Time to Spy: A Loud House Movie	2024	animation services	Nickelodeon Animation Studio
A Loud House Christmas Movie: Naughty or Nice	2025	animation services	Nickelodeon Animation Studio

=== Jam Filled Toronto ===
Logo of Starz Animation

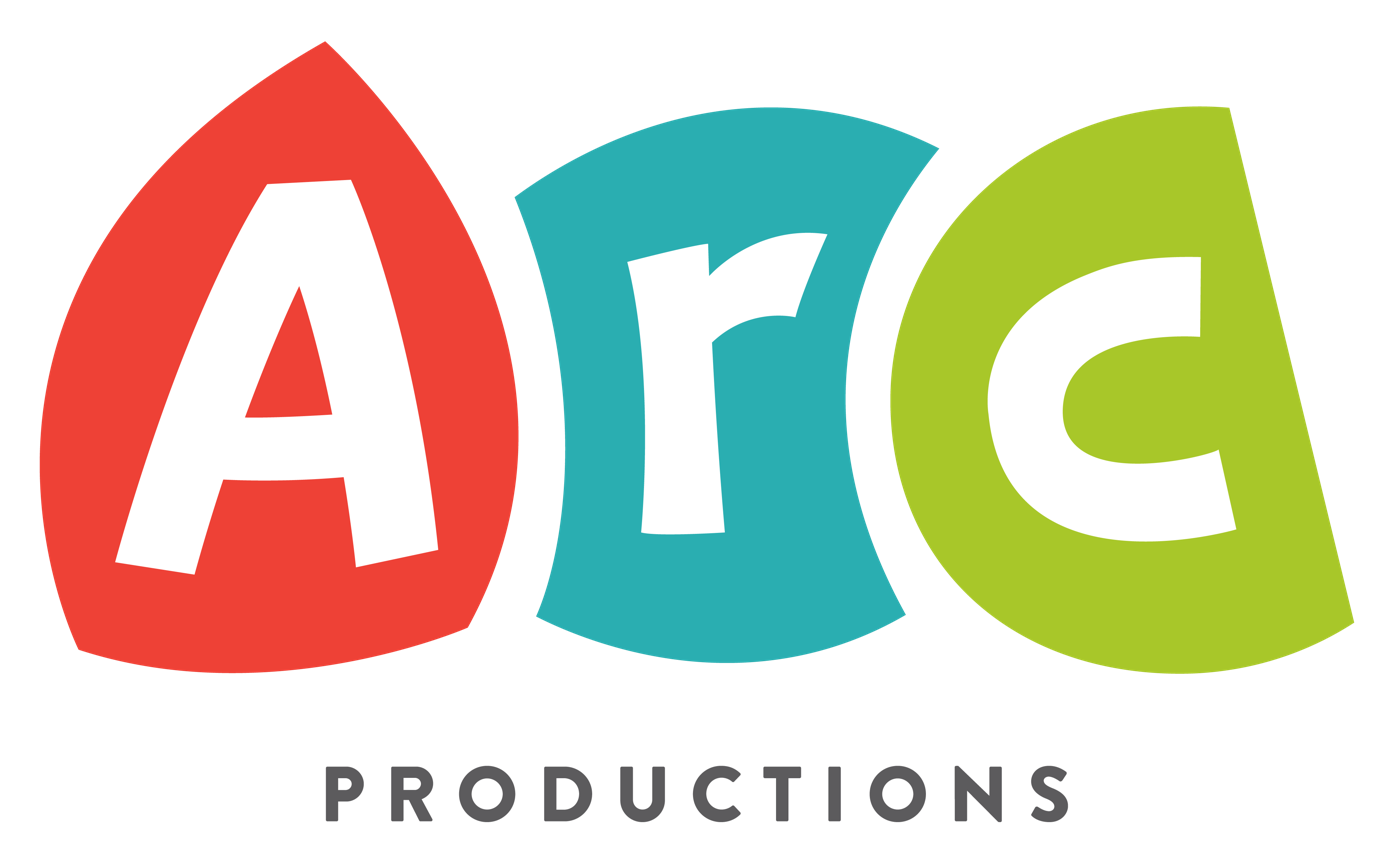
Logo of Arc Productions

The Toronto branch of Jam Filled Entertainment was originally established as Dan Krech Productions on June 24, 1985, as one of the first visual effects companies in Toronto. In 1987, DKP became the first company in Canada to have an in-house digital suite. DKP had produced visual effects and animation for over 2,000 commercials and long-form projects by 2000, many of them for U.S. companies. DKP moved to a new facility on Queen Street East in March 2001. American telecommunications company IDT Corporation acquired DKP Effects on March 16, 2004, leading to the company being renamed DKP Studios.

On May 26, 2006, Liberty Media bought IDT Entertainment from IDT, including Anchor Bay Entertainment and Film Roman, and merged it with the Starz cable network to form Starz Media. Under its new management in 2007, the studio began a "Starz Shortz" program which has produced Bundle of Joy, Enter the Sandbox, Ormie and Lovebirds. In 2007, Starz Animation took over animating Shane Acker's feature 9 from Attitude Studio, Luxembourg. In 2010, the studio opened a major VFX wing to create all the effects for the new Starz Channel/Graham King Productions miniseries, Camelot, Alcon Entertainment's Dolphin Tale, and producer Avi Arad's family feature, Robosapien: Rebooted.

In April 2011, Liberty Starz sold Starz Animation to a Canadian consortium, and it was renamed Arc Productions. Under the new owner, the studio was planning to do more proprietary production.

On July 29, 2016, Arc Productions entered receivership and closed down its studio, locking out 500 employees after telling them there was a payroll glitch and no one had been paid. At the time of closure, Arc had been working on the film Blazing Samurai. On August 22, 2016, Jam Filled Entertainment acquired Arc's assets out of receivership, reopening its Toronto studio and rehiring most of its staff.

==== Television series ====
Title	Year(s)	Notes	Client(s)
Dan Krech Productions
High Tide	1994	main title design and graphics	Franklin/Waterman 2
DKP Effects
3-2-1 Penguins!	2002	animation	Big Idea Productions
DKP Studios
Game Over	2004	animation	The Carsey-Werner Company
VeggieTales	2004–05	animation	Big Idea Productions
IDT Entertainment
VeggieTales	2006	animation; continued from DKP Studios	Big Idea Productions
Starz Animation
VeggieTales	2007	animation; continued from IDT Entertainment	Big Idea Productions
Chop Socky Chooks	2008	animation; 9 episodes	Aardman Animations; Decode Entertainment
Camelot	2011	visual effects	Starz Entertainment
The Simpsons	2011	"Condiments" sequence	Gracie Films; 20th Television Animation
Arc Productions
Matt Hatter Chronicles	2011–12	animation; seasons 1–2	Platinum Films
Barbie: Life in the Dreamhouse	2012–15	animation	Mattel Television
Halo 4: Forward Unto Dawn	2012	visual effects	Microsoft Studios; 343 Industries
Lego Marvel Super Heroes: Maximum Overload	2013	animation	Marvel Entertainment
Thomas & Friends	2013–16	animation; series 17–20	HiT Entertainment
Lost in Oz	2015	animation; pilot	Bureau of Magic; Amazon Studios
Lego Marvel Super Heroes: Avengers Reassembled	2015	animation	Marvel Entertainment
Elena of Avalor	2016	animation; 7 episodes	Disney Television Animation
Rusty Rivets	2016	animation	Spin Master Entertainment
Trollhunters: Tales of Arcadia	2016	animation; 3 episodes	DreamWorks Animation Television
Tarzan and Jane	2017–18	animation	Arad Animation; 41 Entertainment
Jam Filled Toronto
WellieWishers	2017	animation; season 2	Mattel Creations
Kody Kapow	2017	animation	Zodiak Kids
The Polos	2019	animation	Boat Rocker Studios
Bubble Guppies	2019–23	animation; seasons 5–6	Nickelodeon Animation Studio
Kingdom Force	2019–20	animation	Industrial Brothers; Boat Rocker Studios
Dino Ranch	2021–24	animation	Industrial Brothers; Boat Rocker Studios
A Tale Dark & Grimm	2021	animation	Boat Rocker Studios; Netflix Animation
Rubble & Crew	2023–present	animation	Spin Master Entertainment
Vida the Vet	2024–present	animation	Spin Master Entertainment

==== Specials/shorts ====
Title	Year(s)	Notes	Client(s)
DKP Effects
Space Station 3D	2002		IMAX Corporation
DKP Studios
Surly Squirrel	2005	short film	
The Happy Elf	2005	animation	Film Roman; HC Productions
Starz Animation
Enter the Sandbox	2009	short film; animation	
Yes, Virginia	2009	animation	The Ebeling Group; JWT Productions
Ormie	2010	short series	
Arc Productions
Snack Attack	2012	short film	
Pixie Hollow Bake Off	2013	animation	Disneytoon Studios
Ice Age: The Great Egg-Scapade	2016	animation	Blue Sky Studios
Max Steel: Team Turbo	2016	animation	Mattel Studios

==== Films ====
Title	Year(s)	Notes	Client(s)
Dan Krech Productions
Eve of Destruction	1991	special effects and post-production	Orion Pictures
Far from Home: The Adventures of Yellow Dog	1995	special effects	20th Century Fox
National Lampoon's Senior Trip	1995	special effects	Alliance Communications
Bogus	1996	special effects	Warner Bros. Pictures
The Siege	1998		20th Century Fox
The Nuttiest Nutcracker	1999		Columbia TriStar Home Video
DKP Effects
Joseph: King of Dreams	2000	3D effects	DreamWorks Animation
Picture Claire	2001	main titles design and special effects	Alliance Atlantis Releasing Ltd
The First $20 Million Is Always the Hardest	2002	special effects	20th Century Fox
Scourge of Worlds: A Dungeons & Dragons Adventure	2003	special effects	
DKP Studios
Nerf N-Strike	2004	animation, lighting, & special/animation effects	Hasbro
The Librarian: Quest for the Spear	2004	special effects	
Everyone's Hero	2006	animation	20th Century Fox
Starz Animation
The Pirates Who Don't Do Anything: A VeggieTales Movie	2008	animation	Universal Pictures; Big Idea Productions
Space Chimps	2008		20th Century Fox; Vanguard Animation
9	2009	Special Effects	Focus Features; Relativity Media
Gnomeo & Juliet	2011		Touchstone Pictures; Rocket Pictures
Arc Productions
Hoodwinked Too! Hood vs. Evil	2011	animation	The Weinstein Company
Dolphin Tale	2011	visual effects and animation	Warner Bros. Pictures
The Amazing Spider-Man	2012	additional visual effects	Columbia Pictures
Robosapien: Rebooted	2013	animation	Anchor Bay Films
Thomas & Friends: King of the Railway	2013	animation	HiT Entertainment
Barbie & Her Sisters in A Pony Tale	2013	animation	Mattel Studios
Thomas & Friends: Tale of the Brave	2014	animation	HiT Entertainment
Thomas & Friends: The Adventure Begins	2015	animation	HiT Entertainment
Thomas & Friends: Sodor's Legend of the Lost Treasure	2015	animation	HiT Entertainment
Barbie & Her Sisters in The Great Puppy Adventure	2015	animation	Mattel Studios
Before I Wake	2016	visual effects	Intrepid Pictures
Thomas & Friends: The Great Race	2016	animation	HiT Entertainment
Barbie: Star Light Adventure	2016	animation	Mattel Creations
