= Remy & Boo =

- Genre: Adventure; Children
- Created by: Matthew Fernandes
- Voices of: Ava Ro; Robert Tinkler; Chris D'Silva; Madison Abbott; Katie Griffin; Jonathan Tan; Brad Adamson; Derek McGrath; John Cleland; Bryn McAuley
- Country of origin: Canada
- Original language: English
- No. of seasons: 1
- No. of episodes: 26 (52 segments)

Production
- Executive producers: Arthur Spanos; Matthew Fernandes; Tammy Semen; Chapman Maddox; David Fortier; Ivan Schneeberg
- Producer: Vanessa Wong
- Running time: 22 minutes (2 11-minute segments)
- Production companies: Industrial Brothers; Boat Rocker Studios

Original release
- Network: Universal Kids (United States); CBC Kids/Ici Radio-Canada Télé (Canada)
- Release: May 1 – October 10, 2020

Remy & Boo is a Canadian animated children's TV series created by Matthew Fernandes and produced by Industrial Brothers and Boat Rocker Studios in association with Radio-Canada and Universal Kids that premiered on Universal Kids on May 1, 2020. It focuses on an adventurous 6-year-old girl and her best friend, who is a big, squishy, pink robot.

After 26 episodes (52 half-hour segments), the series concluded on October 10, 2020, but only ran for the first season.

== Premise ==
The series follows Remy Kay, an adventurous 6-year-old girl with a unique best friend named Boo, who is a big, squishy, pink robot. Fueled by Remy's indomitable spirit and Boo's can-do attitude, their days in Dolphin Bay are filled with new adventures both big and small, powered by two incredible imaginations. Through heartwarming, humorous and inventive storytelling, the characters discover their place in the world and learn that there is no greater power than the power of friendship.

== Characters ==
=== Main ===
- Remy Kay (voiced by Ava Ro) is an interracial 6-year-old girl who is able to play the ukulele.
- Boo (voiced by Rob Tinkler) is Remy's robot and companion who resembles a quadruped creature. His abilities include flying by conjuring balloons from his back, shooting light-based confetti, or extending a robot arm with a certain tool to fix things. To recharge, Boo needs to either be in his charging pod, go into sleep mode, or in small doses receive hugs called "snuzzles" from Remy. Despite mostly mumbling, Boo is able to speak a few words.

=== Recurring ===
- Nikhil (voiced by Chris D'Silva) is an 6-year-old Indian-Canadian boy who is one of Remy's best friends. He likes sci-fi and reads comics related to it.
- Mia (voiced by Madison Abbott) is Remy's 6-year-old redheaded friend. Her mother bought her a toy dog from Japan, named Cutesoo. It is one of the pets in the show.
- Remy's Mom (Mrs. Kay) (voiced by Katie Griffin) is an Anglo-Canadian marine biologist. She was interviewed once on TV, and she dives under the sea. Like her daughter, she can play the ukulele.
- Remy's Dad (Mr. Kay) (voiced by Jonathan Tan) is an Asian-Canadian diner operator and runs a diner called Shrimpy's, and he also dives under the sea.
- Skipper Jack (voiced by Brad Adamson) is a fisherman.
- Poppy (voiced by Derek McGrath) is Remy's maternal grandfather and Boo's creator who lives in the lighthouse. As a young child, Poppy created a wind-up toy which would be the basis for Boo's design.
- Mr. Periwinkle (voiced by John Cleland) is Remy and Boo's snooty neighbour who lives on their opposite side of the street.
- Skylar (voiced by Gabby Clarke) is Remy's cousin who used to have the same interests as Remy but has adapted into the goth subculture when her ex-best friend Ava left Dolphin Bay.
- EB (voiced by Bryn McAuley) is Remy's friend who works at a milkshake stand. She dons a pink pixie cut. The official article about the show mentions her as an honorary sister to Remy. What her name stands for is never stated. Like Remy, EB can play the ukulele.

=== Pets ===
- Beans is Remy's family pet cat.
- Cutesu is Mia's high-tech toy dog that almost has a mind of its own. It almost only barks, but at times says "I love you!"
- Peaches is Mr. Periwinkle's pet poodle with no definite gender. (Note: In "Lost and Found", Peaches is referred as she. In "Pup Sitting Peaches", Peaches is referred as he.)

== Episodes ==
No.	Title	Directed by	Written by	Storyboarded by	Original release date	Prod. code	U.S. viewers (millions)
1	"Invisiboo"	Lesley Headrick	Story by : Tom Berger; Teleplay by : Jiro C. Okada & Meghan Read; Story by : Sheila Rogerson; Teleplay by : Bernice Vanderlaan	Jason Thompson & Marko Bajic; Katherine Lim & Fancia He	January 5, 2020	101	N/A
1	"The Snicklehoot"	Lesley Headrick	Story by : Tom Berger; Teleplay by : Jiro C. Okada & Meghan Read; Story by : Sheila Rogerson; Teleplay by : Bernice Vanderlaan	Jason Thompson & Marko Bajic; Katherine Lim & Fancia He	January 5, 2020	101	N/A
2	"Lost and Found"	Lesley Headrick	Emer Connon; Diana Moore	Jason Thompson & Marko Bajic; Andreas Shuster & Faisal Roja	January 8, 2020	103	N/A
2	"Best Song Ever"	Lesley Headrick	Emer Connon; Diana Moore	Jason Thompson & Marko Bajic; Andreas Shuster & Faisal Roja	January 8, 2020	103	N/A
3	"Fixer Upper Boo Boo"	Lesley Headrick	Jiro C. Okada; Tom Berger	Jason Thompson & Marko Bajic; Katherine Lim & Koko Chou	January 19, 2020	102	N/A
3	"Remy the Brave"	Lesley Headrick	Jiro C. Okada; Tom Berger	Jason Thompson & Marko Bajic; Katherine Lim & Koko Chou	January 19, 2020	102	N/A
4	"Seals on Wheels"	Lesley Headrick & Trevor Deane-Freeman	Jiro C. Okada; Scott Stewart & Julie Stewart	Andreas Shuster & Faisal Roja; Koko Chou	February 16, 2020	106	N/A
4	"The Giveaway"	Lesley Headrick & Trevor Deane-Freeman	Jiro C. Okada; Scott Stewart & Julie Stewart	Andreas Shuster & Faisal Roja; Koko Chou	February 16, 2020	106	N/A
5	"Midnight Snuzzle"	Lesley Headrick; Lesley Headrick & Trevor Deane-Freeman	Story by : Amy Brown; Teleplay by : Diana Moore; Amy Brown	Katherine Lim & Koko Chou; Jason Thompson & Marko Bajic	February 25, 2020	104	N/A
5	"Boo-Dazzled"	Lesley Headrick; Lesley Headrick & Trevor Deane-Freeman	Story by : Amy Brown; Teleplay by : Diana Moore; Amy Brown	Katherine Lim & Koko Chou; Jason Thompson & Marko Bajic	February 25, 2020	104	N/A
6	"The Voice"	Lesley Headrick & Trevor Deane-Freeman	Scott Stewart & Julie Stewart; Tom Berger	Alexandra Langenbeck & Sara Mota; Al Teng	March 2, 2020	105	N/A
6	"Boo and Cutesu"	Lesley Headrick & Trevor Deane-Freeman	Scott Stewart & Julie Stewart; Tom Berger	Alexandra Langenbeck & Sara Mota; Al Teng	March 2, 2020	105	N/A
7	"Boo Lights the Way"	Lesley Headrick & Trevor Deane-Freeman	Bernice Vanderlaan; Phil Ivanusic	Jason Thompson; Marko Bajic	April 16, 2020	107	N/A
7	"Handy Helpers"	Lesley Headrick & Trevor Deane-Freeman	Bernice Vanderlaan; Phil Ivanusic	Jason Thompson; Marko Bajic	April 16, 2020	107	N/A
8	"Empress Uni-Boo the Space Pirate"	Lesley Headrick & Trevor Deane-Freeman	Tom Berger; Story by : Jennifer Daley & John Slama; Teleplay by : John Slama	Sara Mota; Alexandra Langenbeck & Andreas Shuster	April 20, 2020	108	N/A
8	"My Side, Your Side"	Lesley Headrick & Trevor Deane-Freeman	Tom Berger; Story by : Jennifer Daley & John Slama; Teleplay by : John Slama	Sara Mota; Alexandra Langenbeck & Andreas Shuster	April 20, 2020	108	N/A
9	"Picture This"	Lesley Headrick & Trevor Deane-Freeman	Diana Moore; Bernice Vanderlaan	Al Teng; Koko Chou	May 11, 2020	109	N/A
9	"Special Boo-livery"	Lesley Headrick & Trevor Deane-Freeman	Diana Moore; Bernice Vanderlaan	Al Teng; Koko Chou	May 11, 2020	109	N/A
10	"You Do You, Boo"	Lesley Headrick & Trevor Deane-Freeman	Evan Thaler Hickey; Doug Sinclair	Christos Rousakos & Steph Southgate; Marko Bajic	May 28, 2020	110	N/A
10	"Family Photo"	Lesley Headrick & Trevor Deane-Freeman	Evan Thaler Hickey; Doug Sinclair	Christos Rousakos & Steph Southgate; Marko Bajic	May 28, 2020	110	N/A
11	"How to Call a Narwhal"	Lesley Headrick & Trevor Deane-Freeman	Tom Berger; Scott Stewart & Julie Stewart	Alexandra Langenbeck & Andreas Shuster; Sara Mota	June 14, 2020	111	N/A
11	"Beautiful Boo-quet"	Lesley Headrick & Trevor Deane-Freeman	Tom Berger; Scott Stewart & Julie Stewart	Alexandra Langenbeck & Andreas Shuster; Sara Mota	June 14, 2020	111	N/A
12	"Hurty Things"	Lesley Headrick & Trevor Deane-Freeman	Story by : Craig Martin; Teleplay by : Jiro C. Okada & Craig Martin; Evan Thaler Hickey	Andreas Shuster & Steph Southgate; Koko Chou	July 12, 2020	112	N/A
12	"The Great Boo-Tective"	Lesley Headrick & Trevor Deane-Freeman	Story by : Craig Martin; Teleplay by : Jiro C. Okada & Craig Martin; Evan Thaler Hickey	Andreas Shuster & Steph Southgate; Koko Chou	July 12, 2020	112	N/A
13	"Rescue Pilots"	Lesley Headrick & Trevor Deane-Freeman	Story by : Ashley Lannigan; Teleplay by : Emer Connon; Jason Hopley	Jason Thompson & Seema Virdi; Marko Bajic	July 25, 2020	113	N/A
13	"Boo's Butterfly Bumble"	Lesley Headrick & Trevor Deane-Freeman	Story by : Ashley Lannigan; Teleplay by : Emer Connon; Jason Hopley	Jason Thompson & Seema Virdi; Marko Bajic	July 25, 2020	113	N/A
14	"Boo's Pack Knack"	Lesley Headrick & Trevor Deane-Freeman	Tom Berger; Phil Ivanusic	Andreas Shuster; Mark Stanleigh	October 5, 2020	115	N/A
14	"Boo-th Fairy"	Lesley Headrick & Trevor Deane-Freeman	Tom Berger; Phil Ivanusic	Andreas Shuster; Mark Stanleigh	October 5, 2020	115	N/A
15	"Secret Agent Reversi-Boo"	Lesley Headrick & Trevor Deane-Freeman	Doug Sinclair; Bernice Vanderlaan	Jeremy Bondy; Andreas Shuster & Marko Bajic	October 5, 2020	116	N/A
15	"Poppy's Treasure"	Lesley Headrick & Trevor Deane-Freeman	Doug Sinclair; Bernice Vanderlaan	Jeremy Bondy; Andreas Shuster & Marko Bajic	October 5, 2020	116	N/A
16	"Getting Crabby"	Lesley Headrick & Trevor Deane-Freeman	Jason Hopley; Evan Thaler Hickey	Sara Mota; Steph Southgate	October 6, 2020	117	N/A
16	"Thank Boo"	Lesley Headrick & Trevor Deane-Freeman	Jason Hopley; Evan Thaler Hickey	Sara Mota; Steph Southgate	October 6, 2020	117	N/A
17	"Pup Sitting Peaches"	Lesley Headrick; Trevor Deane-Freeman	Amy Brown; Phil Ivanusic	Sara Mota; Steph Southgate	October 6, 2020	119	N/A
17	"Unhappy Campers"	Lesley Headrick; Trevor Deane-Freeman	Amy Brown; Phil Ivanusic	Sara Mota; Steph Southgate	October 6, 2020	119	N/A
18	"Ducky Dilemma"	Lesley Headrick & Trevor Deane-Freeman	John Slama; Diana Moore	Sara Mota; Steph Southgate	October 7, 2020	114	N/A
18	"Inflati-Boo"	Lesley Headrick & Trevor Deane-Freeman	John Slama; Diana Moore	Sara Mota; Steph Southgate	October 7, 2020	114	N/A
19	"Bubbly Boo"	Lesley Headrick & Trevor Deane-Freeman; Trevor Deane-Freeman	Evan Thaler Hickey; Jason Hopley	Christos Rousakos & Mark Stanleigh; Katherine Lim & Marko Bajic	October 7, 2020	120	N/A
19	"A Night at the Boo-vies"	Lesley Headrick & Trevor Deane-Freeman; Trevor Deane-Freeman	Evan Thaler Hickey; Jason Hopley	Christos Rousakos & Mark Stanleigh; Katherine Lim & Marko Bajic	October 7, 2020	120	N/A
20	"Buccaneer Bounty Hunt"	Lesley Headrick; Lesley Headrick & Trevor Deane-Freeman	Jocelyn Geddie; Tom Berger	Christos Rousakos; Mark Stanleigh	October 8, 2020	118A	N/A
20	"Buccaneers of Dolphin Bay"	Lesley Headrick; Lesley Headrick & Trevor Deane-Freeman	Jocelyn Geddie; Tom Berger	Christos Rousakos; Mark Stanleigh	October 8, 2020	126A	N/A
21	"The Squailer"	Lesley Headrick; Lesley Headrick & Trevor Deane-Freeman	Jiro C. Okada; Jocelyn Geddie	Sara Mota; Steph Southgate	October 8, 2020	121	N/A
21	"Prank-a-Boo-Looza"	Lesley Headrick; Lesley Headrick & Trevor Deane-Freeman	Jiro C. Okada; Jocelyn Geddie	Sara Mota; Steph Southgate	October 8, 2020	121	N/A
22	"Remy, I Shrunk the Boo"	Lesley Headrick & Trevor Deane-Freeman; Trevor Deane-Freeman	Bernice Vanderlaan; Tom Berger	Christos Rousakos; Christos Rousakos & Sara Mota	October 9, 2020	122	N/A
22	"Not So Wheelie Fun Race"	Lesley Headrick & Trevor Deane-Freeman; Trevor Deane-Freeman	Bernice Vanderlaan; Tom Berger	Christos Rousakos; Christos Rousakos & Sara Mota	October 9, 2020	122	N/A
23	"Karate Pops"	Lesley Headrick; Trevor Deane-Freeman	Emer Connon; Evan Thaler Hickey	Sara Mota; Steph Southgate	October 11, 2020	123	N/A
23	"Com-Boo-ter Virus"	Lesley Headrick; Trevor Deane-Freeman	Emer Connon; Evan Thaler Hickey	Sara Mota; Steph Southgate	October 11, 2020	123	N/A
24	"Slum-Boo Party"	Lesley Headrick; Trevor Deane-Freeman	Jocelyn Geddie; Phil Ivanusic	Christos Rousakos; Marko Bajic	October 9, 2020	124	N/A
24	"Cupcake Calamity"	Lesley Headrick; Trevor Deane-Freeman	Jocelyn Geddie; Phil Ivanusic	Christos Rousakos; Marko Bajic	October 9, 2020	124	N/A
25	"Boo-nocchio"	Lesley Headrick; Trevor Deane-Freeman & Lesley Headrick	Jason Hopley; Alan Gregg	Sara Mota; Steph Southgate	October 10, 2020	125	N/A
25	"Boo's New Friends"	Lesley Headrick; Trevor Deane-Freeman & Lesley Headrick	Jason Hopley; Alan Gregg	Sara Mota; Steph Southgate	October 10, 2020	125	N/A
26	"Remy & Boo Delivery Crew"	Trevor Deane-Freeman & Lesley Headrick; Lesley Headrick & Trevor Deane-Freeman	Diana Moore; John Slama	Marko Bajic	October 10, 2020	126B	N/A
26	"Super Boo-ster"	Trevor Deane-Freeman & Lesley Headrick; Lesley Headrick & Trevor Deane-Freeman	Diana Moore; John Slama	Marko Bajic	October 10, 2020	118B	N/A

== Production ==
The show was announced in February 2017 when US broadcaster Universal Kids (which was known as Sprout at that time) greenlighted a CGI animated series called Remy & Boo that would be produced by Canadian animation studio Industrial Brothers along production and distribution company Boat Rocker Studios with them handling distribution rights to the series internationally.

=== Animation ===
Industrial Brothers (which co-producer Boat Rocker Studios held a stake in the studio) handled animation production services for the series alongside Dublin, IE-based CGI animation studio Giant Animation who partnered with Industrial Brothers to handle animated services for the show.
