= Bo on the Go! =

Canadian animated children's television series (2007-2009)

- Genre: Children's; Animated series
- Created by: Michael Donovan; Jeff Rosen; Cheryl Wagner
- Directed by: Robert D.M. Smith (2007); Stewart Dowds (2008–2009)
- Opening theme: "Bo on the Go!"
- Ending theme: "Bo on the Go!" (Instrumental)
- Composer: Blain Morris
- Country of origin: Canada
- Original language: English
- No. of seasons: 3
- No. of episodes: 55

Production
- Running time: 22 minutes
- Production companies: Halifax Film (Note: As Bo Go Productions Incorporated for season 1, Bo Go Productions II Incorporated for season 2, and Bo Go Productions III Incorporated for season 3); Decode Entertainment (distributor)

Original release
- Network: CBC Television; ICI Radio-Canada Télé
- Release: September 3, 2007 – December 18, 2009

Bo on the Go! (stylized Bo on the GO!) is a Canadian CGI-animated children's television series created by Jeff Rosen, Michael Donovan and Cheryl Wagner, produced by Halifax Film and distributed by Decode Entertainment in association with CBC Television and ICI Radio-Canada Télé. It emphasizes the importance of movement for children through a plot element called "animoves" (animations showing specific body movements young viewers must learn in order to solve adventures highlighted in each program's storyline; the name is a combination of 'animal' and 'move' as these movements are represented by animals, such as a galloping horse). The series uses motion capture technology and computer graphics. The series was broadcast in Canada on CBC Television in the Kids' CBC programming block.

Bo on the Go! aired from September 3, 2007 to December 18, 2009. 55 episodes were produced.

== Overview ==
Bo lives in a castle with Dezadore the dragon. He is younger than Bo, and is really curious and often gets into trouble as he is not as physically adept as Bo. Bo's mentor on the show is Wizard. When she encounters challenges, he gives her advice and knowledge of how to achieve the quest at hand, typically giving said information in the form of a rhyme.

== Characters ==
- Bo (voiced by Catherine O'Connor)
- Dezzy (Dezadore) (voiced by Andrew Sabiston)
- Wizard (voiced by Jim Fowler)

== Episodes ==
=== Season 1 (2007) ===
1. Bo's Bluebird (September 3, 2007)
2. Bo and the Doodlebug (September 4, 2007)
3. Bo and the Whirlywart (September 5, 2007)
4. Bo and the Fuzzyflump (September 6, 2007)
5. Bo and the Stinky Snork (September 7, 2007)
6. Bo and the Snoozter (September 8, 2007)
7. Bo and the Neat Freak (September 10, 2007)
8. Bo and the Sproing (September 11, 2007)
9. Bo and the Nothing-Fits-Him (September 12, 2007)
10. Bo and the Lazy Bug (September 12, 2007)
11. Bo and the Dragon Queen (September 13, 2007)
12. Bo and the Drinking Flink (September 14, 2007)
13. Bo and the Hug-a-Bug (September 15, 2007)
14. Bo and the Twinkle-Toed-Twirler (September 17, 2007)
15. Bo and the Silly Stomper (September 18, 2007)
16. Bo and the Fruity-Patooty (September 19, 2007)
17. Bo and the String Snatcher (September 20, 2007)
18. Bo and the Hokum Jokum (September 21, 2007)
19. Bo and the Switcheroo (September 22, 2007)
20. Bo and the Coolster (September 24, 2007)
21. Bo and the Litterbug (September 25, 2007)
22. Bo and the Super Stacker (September 26, 2007)
23. Bo and the Blowhard (September 27, 2007)
24. Bo and the Scribbler (September 28, 2007)
25. Bo and the Red Rosy (October 1, 2007)
26. Bo and the Knotty Noodler (October 2, 2007)

=== Season 2 (2008) ===
1. Bo and the Glimmer Critter (October 31, 2008)
2. Bo and the Creaky Crink (November 4, 2008)
3. Bo and the Stuffy Sniffler (November 5, 2008)
4. Bo and the Gobsobber (November 6, 2008)
5. Bo and the Blockhead (November 7, 2008)
6. Bo and the Melody Maestro (November 8, 2008)
7. Bo and the Ding-A-Ling (November 10, 2008)
8. Bo and the Fun Fair (November 11, 2008)
9. Bo and the Picture Snitcher (November 12, 2008)
10. Bo and the Eager Beaver (November 13, 2008)
11. Bo and the Unwrapping Chappy (November 14, 2008)
12. Bo and the Berrygrabber (November 15, 2008)
13. Bo and the Wrong Side Uppy (November 17, 2008)
14. Bo and the Polka Dot Snatcher (November 21, 2008)

=== Season 3 (2009) ===
1. Bo and the Loony Groomy (March 30, 2009)
2. Bo and Mr. Ha-choo! (March 30, 2009)
3. Bo and the Cozy Critter (April 29, 2009)
4. Bo and the Copy Critter (April 30, 2009)
5. Bo and the Balance Beasty (May 1, 2009)
6. Bo and the Ick 'em Stick 'em (July 28, 2009)
7. Bo and the Shake Maker (August 3, 2009)
8. Bo and the Jeweled Mermaid (August 4, 2009)
9. Bo and the Toy Buster (August 5, 2009)
10. Bo and the Pull Apart-er (August 6, 2009)
11. Bo and the Power-On Pixie (August 7, 2009)
12. Bo and the Float Fairy (August 10, 2009)
13. Bo and the Worry Wart (August 11, 2009)
14. Bo and the Costume Collector (August 12, 2009)
15. Bo and the Teeny-Tiny (December 18, 2009)

== International broadcast ==
Bo on the Go! Was broadcast on 18 broadcasters around the world, in over 13 languages, such as Spanish, French (retitled 1, 2, 3, Bo!), Italian, Greek, Arabic, Thai, Finnish, Hebrew, Portuguese (on Disney Junior under the title Bo, em Ação!, lit. 'Bo, in Action!'), Turkish, Hungarian, Chinese, and Gaelic.

== Reception ==
Bo on the Go! received mixed to negative reviews.

Emily Ashby of Common Sense Media gave a show a rate of three stars out of five, stating it "does very well, tasking viewers with numerous physical assignments from twirling their fingers to running in place, under the guise that doing so feeds Bo's power bracelets and gives her the energy to complete her quest." She noted that the show's plot is "very repetitive, and because the emphasis is so directed at exercise, it misses opportunities to incorporate other basic preschool skills that many of its peers do." She concluded, "some missed opportunities keep it from being the total package in a tots' show."
