= Vida the Vet =

Canadian animated television series

- Created by: Dustin Ferrer
- Voices of: Mia SwamiNathan; Desmond Sivan; Jonathan Langdon; Ethan McGurrin; Nylan Parthipan; Nova McKay; Stella Bartlett; River Morales; Scott Gorman; Fontina Fourtounes; Alexa Yaphe; Holly Gorski
- Countries of origin: Canada; United Kingdom
- No. of seasons: 2

Production
- Executive producers: Laura Clunie; Jennifer Dodge; Toni Stevens; Ronnen Harary; Jennifer Oxley
- Production companies: Spin Master Entertainment; Jam Filled Entertainment; Corus Entertainment

Original release
- Network: Treehouse TV (Canada); CBeebies (UK)
- Release: October 14, 2023 – present

Vida the Vet is a British-Canadian animated children's television series created by Dustin Ferrer. Aimed at preschool audiences, the series follows the adventures of a ten-year-old girl named Vida who cares for and treats woodland animals in the fictional town of Sweetwood, combining themes of empathy, problem-solving and animal care.

== Premise ==
Vida the Vet centres on Vida, a compassionate and imaginative 10-year old girl with dreams of becoming a veterinarian. After moving to the tranquil town of Sweetwood, Vida uses her creativity, instincts, and understanding of animal behaviour to help a variety of woodland creatures with their ailments and everyday challenges.

== Cast and characters ==
=== Main ===
- Mia SwamiNathan as Vida.
- Desmond Sivan as Popcorn, Vida's pet hamster.
- Jonathan Langdon as Koa, a tiger.
- Ethan McGurrin as Zigzag, a rabbit.
- Nylan Parthipan as Tidbit, a turtle.
- Nova McKay as Juno, a hippo.
- Stella Bartlett as Fergie, a squirrel.
- River Morales as Sunny, a mouse.
- Scott Gorman as Otto, a bear.
- Fontina Fourtounes as Pippin, Banjo’s younger koala sister.
- Logan Aultman as Banjo, Pippen's older koala brother.
- Alexa Yaphe (season 1) and Holly Gorski (season 2) as Kipp, a fox.
- Dean Humphries as Toby, a gopher.
- Jessica Tang as Daphne, a giraffe.
- Oliver Woon as Colby, a dolphin.
- Cory Doran and Joseph Motiki as Vida's two fathers.
- Sage Arrindell as Lavender, a skunk.
- Eliot Dahan as Prickly, a porcupine.
- Athan Giazitzidis as Birdie, a bird.
- Malcolm Ross as Molasses, a snail.
- Markeda McKay as Clickety, a hermit crab.
- Delia Lisette Chambers as Sylvie, a butterfly.

== Production ==
The series was produced by Spin Master Entertainment and animated by Jam Filled Entertainment.

== Broadcast and release ==
Vida the Vet premiered/launched on BBC's children's channel CBeebies and its streaming platform BBC iPlayer in the United Kingdom, on Corus Entertainment's Treehouse and STACKTV in Canada, and on YouTube during Fall 2023. In the United States, the show aired on the Nick Jr. Channel.

== Reception ==
Syndi Ellis of Y! Entertainment said the show, "is all about our sweet furry — and feathery and scaly — friends, and kids will fall in love with each and every one of them"
