= Daniel Spellbound =

Canadian-American animated television series

- Genre: Fantasy; Adventure
- Created by: Matt Fernandes
- Written by: Merrill Hagan
- Directed by: Trevor Deane-Freeman; Matt Fernandes
- Countries of origin: United States; Canada
- Original language: English
- No. of seasons: 2
- No. of episodes: 20

Production
- Executive producers: Arthur Spanos; Tammy Semen; Matt Fernandes; Jon Rutherford; David Fortier; Chapman Maddox; Ivan Schneeberg
- Editor: Merrill Hagan
- Running time: 22 minutes
- Production companies: Industrial Brothers; Boat Rocker Studios

Original release
- Network: Netflix
- Release: October 27, 2022 – January 26, 2023

Daniel Spellbound is an animated television series made from Matt Fernandes of Industrial Brothers. It is produced by Boat Rocker Studios. The first season premiered on Netflix on October 27, 2022. The second and final season premiered on January 26, 2023.

== Characters ==
=== Main characters ===
- Daniel Spellbound (voiced by Alex Barima) - is an Afro-Latino orphan teenage ex-tracker of the magical world hidden from humans. His job was to find ingredients for magicians. In season 2, he's no longer a tracker due to breaking the tracker code so he has to find an untrackable item to regain being a tracker again. In “The Tickle Pit”, Jayce manages to help Daniel by presenting the other trackers with an untrackable item and now he is back to being a tracker, but quits at the end of the season, joining Lucy on her quest around the world to seal Dread Magic.
- Hoagie (voiced by Deven Mack) - is a human-turned-pig being who can sniff out magic and is Daniel's best friend and sidekick.
- Lucy Santana (voiced by Chantel Riley) - is an African-American Dowser magician who works for the Bureau of Magical Enforcement and is one of Daniel's friends. At the end of Season 1, she becomes the new head of the BoME. In Season 2, Lucy can become the new Primus if she finds The Primus's Scepter. At the end of season 2 Lucy became the new primus.
- Shakila "Shak" Chinda (voiced by Saara Chaudry) - is a Bengali tracker and the younger sister of Jayce Chinda.

=== Supporting characters ===
- Viktor Albright (voiced by Philip Craig) - the factor of Albright Worldwide and an alchemist who appears to be an old friend of Daniel's father, Duncan Spellbound. In the Season 1 finale, “Hold On Tight”, he got killed by Camilla. (as the Dark Mage).
- Tyson (voiced by Dwayne Hill) a hotdog vendor who is one of Daniel's customers.
- Hector (voiced by Sean Rey) a spider centaur who works at the Cheat Code.
- Burden (voiced by Rainbow Sun Francks) both a tracker and wizard.
- Bixby Prospero (voiced by Lynn Rafferty) a half-goblin tracker.
- Nurenya (voiced by Ellen Dublin) - a mermaid queen from Shanghai, China.
- Spanos (voiced by Joe Pingue) - a weapon forger and the younger brother of Nurenya.
- Haruspex (voiced by Nadine Roden) - an oracle who knows anything.
- Elyse (voiced by Julie Sype) - a former dowser and a rival of Lucy, she intends to be the new Primus of the Bureau of Magical Enforcement. In “The Scepter and the Sacrifice”, she got killed after a rock monster smashed on her.

=== Villains ===
- Camilla Thomas/Dark Mage (voiced by Kyra Harper) - was the former head of the Bureau of Magical Enforcement. Her goal was to control all the magic.
- The Pie Maker (voiced by Catherine Disher) - is an evil diminutive witch whom Daniel knew to be the most wicked in all of New York. She owns a pie bakery and masquerades herself as a harmless old lady.
- Kel (voiced by Paul Amos) - is owner of Mystic Outpost who sells weapons and magical objects to buyers.
- Jaisukh “Jayce” Chinda (voiced by Al Mukadam) - was a former Bengali legendary tracker and the older brother of Shak Chinda who got turned into a demon when he was corrupted by Dread Magic. His intention was to find the Coffer of the Spellbounds so he could unleash Dread Magic and corrupt the world.

== Episodes ==
=== Series overview ===
Series overview
Season	Episodes	Originally released
1	10	October 27, 2022
2	10	January 26, 2023

=== Season 1 (2022) ===
No. overall	No. in season	Title	Directed by	Written by	Original release date
1	1	"Dirty Hands"	Trevor Deane-Freeman & Matt Fernandes	Merrill Hagan & Michele Cavin	October 27, 2022
To settle his debt with the evil Pie Maker, Daniel must track a rare magical item: the Fugu Rose. But not without the help of a talking pig named Hoagie.
2	2	"D Is for Dungeon"	Matt Fernandes & Trevor Deane-Freeman	Merrill Hagan	October 27, 2022
During an unexpected visit to the Bureau of Magical Enforcement, the Primus offers to help Daniel out of his deal with Pie Maker — for a price.
3	3	"The Cheat Code"	Trevor Deane-Freeman & Matt Fernandes	Kevin Burke & Chris "Doc" Wyatt	October 27, 2022
Daniel's on the hunt for a Boatman Token, which may bring him one step closer to the Gryphon's Egg... if he can find the right item to trade for it.
4	4	"Under the Open Water"	Trevor Deane-Freeman & Matt Fernandes	Anne Mortensen-Agnew	October 27, 2022
In the wake of a close confrontation — and a narrow escape — Daniel, Lucy and Hoagie travel to Shanghai in search of a royal gem.
5	5	"I Will Win Your Heart"	Matt Fernandes & Trevor Deane-Freeman	Anne Toole & Chris Gentile	October 27, 2022
While Lucy distracts a salesperson at an illegal trading post, Daniel and Hoagie sneak into a vault to steal the heart of the Mermaid Queen.
6	6	"Look What I Got"	Matt Fernandes & Trevor Deane-Freeman	Akira "Mark" Fujita	October 27, 2022
After a run-in with a rival tracker, Daniel and Lucy must barter with gremlins to repair their ice cream truck and resume their magical journey.
7	7	"Big Fat Nope"	Trevor Deane-Freeman & Matt Fernandes	Roni Brown	October 27, 2022
Daniel and Lucy storm the hive of the Insect King in search of the Key Staff, only to find that someone's already beaten them to it.
8	8	"How Dare You"	Matt Fernandes & Trevor Deane-Freeman	Anne Mortensen-Agnew	October 27, 2022
To hold up their end of the Tracker Code, the trio leads a rival tracker to the Gryphon's lair. But getting out alive? That's another story.
9	9	"A Sandwich of Evil"	Trevor Deane-Freeman & Matt Fernandes	Kevin Burke & Chris "Doc" Wyatt	October 27, 2022
Lucy's quick thinking keeps the Gryphon's Egg out of the hands of the Dark Mage… for now. But Daniel worries the egg is too powerful for any one person.
10	10	"Hold on Tight"	Trevor Deane-Freeman & Matt Fernandes	Merrill Hagan	October 27, 2022
In a final battle with the Dark Mage, Daniel, Lucy and Hoagie must defend the Gryphon's Egg. The fate of the magical world — and ours — depends on it.

=== Season 2 (2023) ===
No. overall	No. in season	Title	Directed by	Written by	Original release date
11	1	"Swing Batter Batter"	Trevor Deane-Freeman	Merrill Hagan	January 26, 2023
To rejoin the Trackers' Guild, Daniel needs an Untrackable — and his new friend Shak knows exactly where to find one.
12	2	"A Secret for a Secret"	Trevor Deane-Freeman	Anne Mortensen-Agnew	January 26, 2023
After coming across an unusual shrine in Jayce's hideout, the group travels to the most cursed place on Earth to look for the legendary tracker.
13	3	"The Hidden Island"	Trevor Deane-Freeman	Kevin Burke & Chris "Doc" Wyatt	January 26, 2023
Daniel decides to help Jayce track an ancient coffer in exchange for an item he desperately needs... if they can make it off a mysterious island alive.
14	4	"The Tickle Pit"	Trevor Deane-Freeman	Chris Gentile	January 26, 2023
At the illegal trading post, Jayce tries to make good on his deal with Daniel. But first, Daniel must play a sinister game to pay off his debt to Kel.
15	5	"Witches Only"	Trevor Deane-Freeman	Roni Brown	January 26, 2023
In order to get their hands on Witching Silver, the gang infiltrates a secret forge. Meanwhile, Lucy and Hoagie pay a visit to the oracle.
16	6	"Break On Through"	Trevor Deane-Freeman	Jacob Fox	January 26, 2023
The team astral projects into another realm to figure out the location of the Scepter. There, Daniel learns about his family from an unexpected source.
17	7	"Gizmos and Death Traps"	Trevor Deane-Freeman	Anne Mortensen-Agnew	January 26, 2023
To repair his armor, Daniel will have to strike a deal with a tough-talking fish. Then, Jayce and Shak storm a volcano in search of the Scepter.
18	8	"The Final Trial"	Trevor Deane-Freeman	Evan Narcisse	January 26, 2023
In Selcouth, the teams must pass four trials to win the Scepter — unless someone untrustworthy beats them to it.
19	9	"The Scepter and the Sacrifice"	Trevor Deane-Freeman	Kevin Burke & Chris "Doc" Wyatt	January 26, 2023
A powerful item falls into unexpected hands, leaving Shak to make an impossible choice. Later, Daniel and his friends try to contain a dark force.
20	10	"You've Looked Better"	Trevor Deane-Freeman	Merrill Hagan	January 26, 2023
Back in New York, the city's greatest magicians combine their powers to battle a formidable foe. But will it be enough to save magic as they know it?

== Production ==
In early February 2021, Daniel Spellbound was announced by Netflix. The series' production is handled by Industrial Brothers and Boat Rocker Studios, whilst the latter's parent company Boat Rocker Media is in charge of global merchandising distribution.

The first season has ten 22-minute episodes.

The second and final season premiered on January 26, 2023.

== Reception ==
Reviewer Riya Singh of Midgard Times said, "The show is suitable for all ages and is a must-watch for animation lovers. Apart from being an action-adventure series, Daniel Spellbound delivers the message of teamwork and the importance of friends in one's life. Also, appearances can be deceptive!"

The Envoy Web's Rishabh Chauhan writes, "The leitmotif that drops in every time the sinister side of Jayce is on screen or acts up is pretty catchy and remains one of the only memorable parts of the music throughout the entirety of the season.

The pacing in Daniel Spellbound season 2, is more effective here as the story takes a lesser amount of detours and divergences than in the first season.

There's a certain sense of warmth that is retained in the sequel and potential which while not tapped into, is certainly one that inspires speculation as to what may unfold next might actually be better."

It's fun for kids and adults alike in season 2."
