= Matador Content =

American production company

- Company type: Subsidiary
- Industry: Entertainment
- Founded: 2013; 13 years ago
- Founders: Jay Peterson; Todd Lubin
- Headquarters: New York City, U.S. Los Angeles, U.S.
- Parent: Boat Rocker Media (2018–present)
- Website: matadorcontent.com

Matador Content (also known as Matador) is an American production company founded in 2013 by Jay Peterson and Todd Lubin. The company produces feature films (mainly documentaries), unscripted television, scripted television and digital programming. Some of Matador's television series include the Hulu series Drag Me to Dinner, AMC series Geeking Out, the GSN series Hellevator, the A&E series Epic Ink, Cement Heads, and Country Bucks, the Lifetime series Project Runway: Fashion Startup, the History series Great Minds with Dan Harmon, the Syfy series Cosplay Melee, and the Discovery Channel series The Impossible Row. Matador's scripted programming includes the Emmy Award-winning Netflix original series The Who Was? Show, and Viceland's first scripted series What Would Diplo Do? starring James Van Der Beek.

Matador also produces the larger than life talent show Go-Big Show for TBS, The Kids Tonight Show for Peacock, the Apple TV+ series Dear..., the Disney Channel series Disney Fam Jam hosted by Ariel Martin, Trevor Tordjman, and Phil Wright, the ABC series Boy Band hosted by Rita Ora, the Emmy Award-nominated Paramount Network series Lip Sync Battle hosted by LL Cool J and Chrissy Teigen, and the kid centric spin-off Lip Sync Battle Shorties on Nickelodeon hosted by Nick Cannon and JoJo Siwa.

Matador's feature film credits include the Emmy Award-nominated HBO documentary Banksy Does New York, which premiered at Doc NYC in 2014, the Emmy Award-nominated Hulu two-part documentary Pretty Baby: Brooke Shields, Hurricane of Fun: The Making of Wet Hot a behind-the-scenes look at the 2001 cult indie film Wet Hot American Summer, Give Me Future, which documented Major Lazer's groundbreaking 2016 concert in Havana, Cuba, Wig, the HBO documentary that explores the history of Wigstock, Billie Eilish: The World's a Little Blurry, the 2021 documentary centered around singer-songwriter Billie Eilish, and the upcoming feature Nonnas starring Vince Vaughn.

== Partnerships and acquisition ==
In 2014, Matador Content formed a joint venture with Untitled Entertainment, the management company behind Jared Leto, Penélope Cruz, and Naomi Watts.

In 2017, Matador Content signed a multi-year production and development deal with Little Creatures, the production company founded by R. J. Cutler and Jane Cha. Later that year, Matador signed a multi-project deal with Bold Soul Studios to develop scripted content.

In 2018, Matador Content was acquired by the Canadian company Boat Rocker Media; Matador would continue to operate as a subsidiary, with Peterson and Lubin reporting to CEO John Young. In 2020, Peterson was promoted to Boat Rocker Studios' head of unscripted, with Lubin continuing to specifically lead Matador Content. In August 2023, Peterson stepped down from the position, and was succeeded by Lubin.

== Filmography ==
=== Television ===
Title	Years	Network	Notes
The Who Was? Show	2018	Netflix	co-production with FremantleMedia Kids & Family, Penguin Random House and Tap That Maple
Disney Fam Jam	2020	Disney Channel	co-production with Disney Branded Television
The Kids Tonight Show	2021	Peacock	co-production with Universal Television Alternative Studio and Electric Hot Dog
Sneaker Wars: Adidas V. Puma	2025	Disney+	co-production with Boat Rocker Studios and Studio 99

=== Films ===
Title	Release date	Distributor	Notes
Billie Eilish: The World's a Little Blurry	February 26, 2021	Apple TV+	co-production with Boat Rocker Studios, Neon, Interscope Films, This Machine Filmworks, Lighthouse Management & Media and The Darkroom
War Game	August 2, 2024	Submarine Deluxe	co-production with Boat Rocker Studios, Anonymous Content, Quaker Motion Pictures and The Littlefield Company
Nonnas	May 9, 2025	Netflix	co-production with Fifth Season, Madison Wells Media and 1Community
