= Cheryl Wagner =

Canadian puppeteer, producer, director and writer

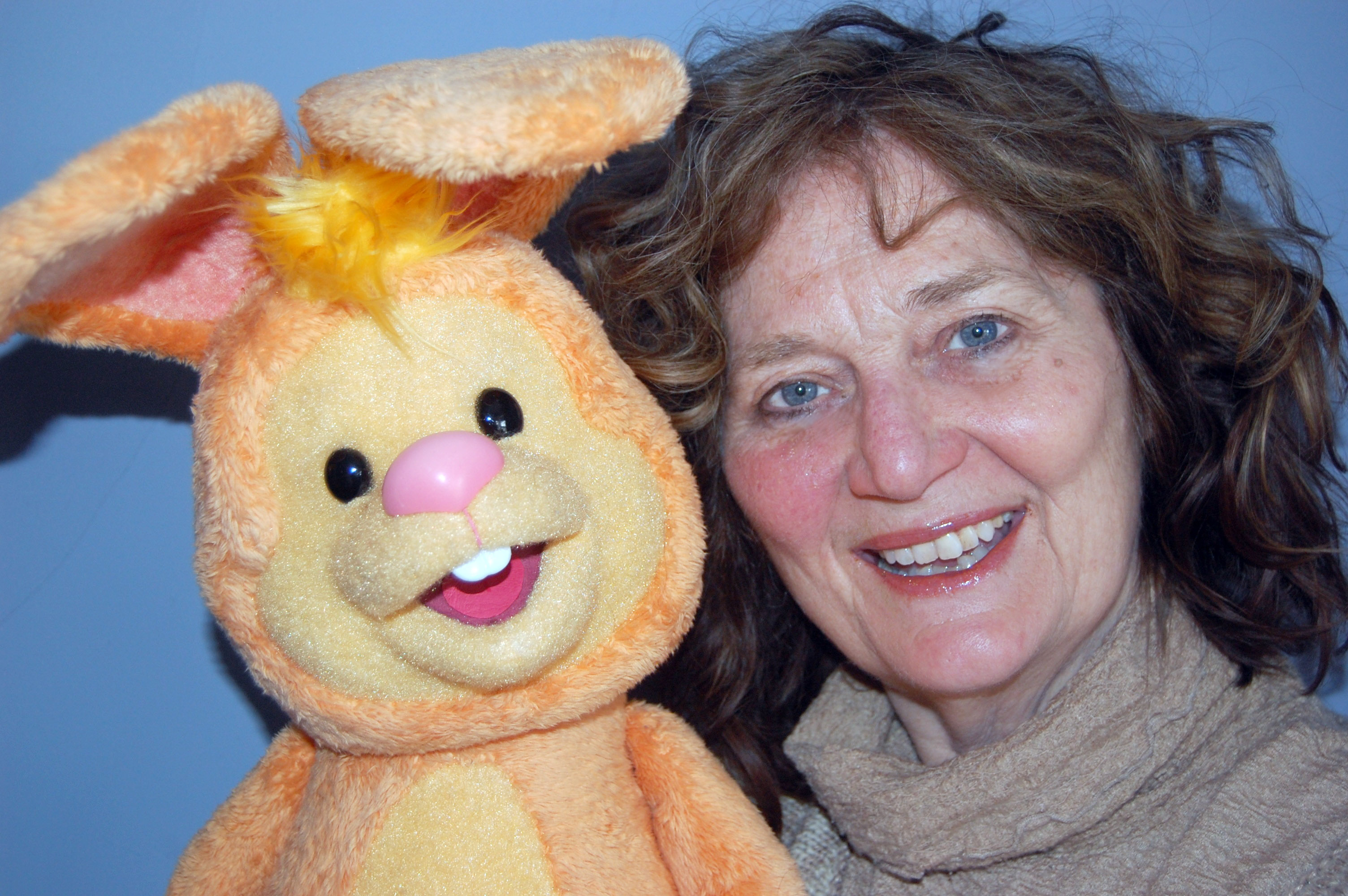
Wagner with Buddy Bunny from Bunny Bop!

Cheryl Wagner is a Canadian puppeteer, producer, director and writer, who is the creator of the TV series The Big Comfy Couch, is a Gemini Award and Emmy award- winning Canadian children's television writer, showrunner and producer who began her career as a performer in both theatre and on the screen. Her Halifax-based touring Merrytime Clown and Puppet Company in which Wagner worked as a clown and puppeteer from 1977 to 1980 provided a fertile ground for her later work as a producer and writer in children's entertainment.

== Puppeteering ==
Jim Henson's Fraggle Rock lured Wagner to Toronto to work as a puppeteer for the full five years and 96 episodes of the series from 1982–87. Wagner was Jim Henson's right hand when he performed his Fraggle characters Cantus and Convincing John. For season 2 to season 5 (1984 to 1987), Wagner provided the voice for the character Ma Gorg.

In 1984, Wagner performed the body suit of the meddling social worker Miss Finch in the Children's Television Workshop film Sesame Street Presents: Follow That Bird.

In 1990, Wagner worked as a puppeteer for the Canadian Sesame Street special, Basil Hears a Noise.

Other television puppetry work included Annie on CBC's long-running preschool series Mr. Dressup and the role of Mrs. Pennypacker on TVO's Today's Special.

== Producer ==
Post-Fraggle, Wagner joined forces with fellow puppeteer Rob Mills to develop and produce her clown and puppet series The Big Comfy Couch through his company Radical Sheep Productions. The show, broadcast by YTV/Treehouse in Canada and throughout the US on PBS-affiliates, features a young clown named Loonette and her side-kick Molly the Doll and their adventures on and around a gigantic green couch. Wagner was the showrunner/story editor for The Big Comfy Couch's 100 episodes that spanned a production arc from 1992 to 2006 and won:

- the 1993 Alliance for Children and Television Award Of Excellence
- the 1995 Gemini Award for Best Children's Program
- the 21st Annual Midsouth Emmy award for Best Children's Program and Best Set Design in 2007

With Radical Sheep, Wagner also worked as producer on the Gemini nominated preschool puppet series Panda Bear Daycare and Ruffus the Dog.

In 1998, Wagner returned to Halifax and joined forces with Jeff Rosen and Michael Donovan at Halifax Film (now DHX Media) to develop and produce animation properties: the preschool Gemini-award-winning stop motion series Poko and the CG series Bo On The Go!, both seen on Kids' CBC. She also wrote the bible and 8 scripts for Catalyst/Cellar Door's classical animation family series Eckhart, set on Prince Edward Island which aired on Teletoon.

== Directing ==
She is now based in Charlottetown, Prince Edward Island and is President of Periscope Pictures Inc. Wagner produced and directed their preschool 15 x 5 minute webseries Bunny Bop! which went on-line February 3, 2011, just in time for the Chinese New Year of the Rabbit.

Preceded by Myra Fried	Ma Gorg; 1984–1987	Succeeded by Aymee Garcia
