= Come Dine with Me Canada =

Canadian reality television series

- Genre: Reality, Dining, Competition
- Directed by: Rina Barone; Arlene Hazzan Green; Michelle Mama; Barbara Margetts; Carolyn Smith; Justin Harding
- Narrated by: Jamie Carr
- Country of origin: Canada
- Original language: English
- No. of seasons: 4
- No. of episodes: 280

Production
- Executive producers: Guy O'Sullivan; Amy Hosking
- Production locations: Toronto, Ontario, Canada
- Running time: 22 minutes
- Production company: Proper Television

Original release
- Network: W Network
- Release: November 1, 2010 – March 17, 2014

Come Dine with Me Canada is a Canadian reality television series; it is adapted from the British programme Come Dine with Me, and produced by Proper Television. The show debuted November 1, 2010 on the W Network. The show generally brings five amateur chefs competing against each other hosting a dinner party for the other contestants. Each competitor then rates the host's performance, with the winner winning a $1,000 cash prize on Fridays; the winner is announced by Friday's dinner party host. An element of comedy is added to the show through comedian Jamie Carr, who provides a dry and "Canadian sarcastic" narration.

In June 2025, Rogers Sports & Media commissioned a second Canadian version of Come Dine with Me for Food Network.

== Season 1 ==
Episodes	Premiered	Location	Contestants				
1–5	1 November 2010	Block 1	Holly Rasky	David Hawe	Jennifer Reimer	James Marshall	Marsha Mowers
6–10	8 November 2010	Block 2	Beth Bovaird	Tania Monaro	Jackson Mann	Simcha Snell	Alex Bruvels
11–15	15 November 2010	Block 3	Joe Guidarelli	Deborah Murphy	Dez Diaz	Kathleen Douglass	Carson Freeman
16–20	22 November 2010	Block 4	Lynn Dalgeish	Walt Medeiros	Holly Van Drat	Santo Ligotti	Rosamund Witchel
21–25	3 January 2011	Block 5	Andrea Degirmenci	Bill Minna	Cathy Habus	Sayeh Hassan	Jonathan Lamb
26–30	10 January 2011	Block 6	Mary Armstrong	Mandy Halpern	Jonathan Wilson	Annabel McMahon	Graham Caswell
31–35	17 January 2011	Block 7	Brian Gangel	Pixie Roney	Graham McWaters	Karen Ahmed	Cassandra Bourne
36–40	24 January 2011	Block 8	Raj Dhillon	Jerry Brown	Tamar Fradkin	Andrew Moniz	Duaina Kirby

== Season 2 ==
Episodes	Premiered	Location	Contestants				
1–5	12 September 2011	Block 1	Mary Newton	Aris Alexiadis	Kailey Finkelman	John Ansell	Louie Katsis
6–10	19 September 2011	Block 2	Louis-Michel Taillefer	Stephen Cane	Tammy Hurst-Erskine	Shareen Woodford	Nerissa Grant
11–15	26 September 2011	Block 3	Stacey McCool	Felix Milien	Twanya Zwicker	James Bateman	Romina De Angelis
16–20	3 October 2011	Block 4	Mike Tsatkas	Sabrina Araya	Ray Minchio	Kelly Gordon	Mary Beth Mccleary
21–25	10 October 2011	Redemption	Dez Diaz	Beth Bovaird	Graham Caswell	Cathy Habus	James Marshall
26–30	17 October 2011	Block 6	Jennifer Peace	Elizabeth Newell	Marco Campisano	Charlie Gandt	Susan Piccinin
31–35	24 October 2011	Block 7	Lilliane Genier	Dylan Studebaker	Sheila Street	Anna Costa	Pat Durante
36–40	7 November 2011	Block 8	Thach Bui	Julia Darby	Kirsti Stephenson	Lesley Sharp-Sheppard	Cathy Fraser
41–45	12 December 2011	Block 9	Bridget McDermid	Nancy Tobis	Sal Girmenia	Pamela Singh	Barb Rebelo
46–50	13 February 2012	Block 10	Bryan McMillan	Kristen Hutchinson	Jeremy Parsons	Helena Quinton	Kym Baines
51–55	20 February 2012	Block 11	Jannett Ioannides	Gerald Watson	Mike Cleaver	Monique Creary	Samara Foisy
56–60	27 February 2012	Block 12	Johnny Cosentino	Mary Colasante	Andrew Clarke	Sima Perry	Dayna Richardson
61–65	5 March 2012	Block 13	Alex Crooks	Jackie Mandziak	Elke Hinson	Adam Hazel	Jackie McGrath
66–70	12 March 2012	Block 14	Emilie Richard	Craig Halket	Shelly Claridge	Ravinder Dhugee	Keith McCrady
71–75	19 March 2012	Block 15	Barbara Boyer	Tracy Cato	Donald Johnston	Lidia Cimicata	Aldo Cundari
76–80	26 March 2012	Block 16	Dennis Monestier	Megan Fostka	John Hastings	Zorana Sadiq	Mark Bardsley

== Season 3 ==
Episodes	Premiered	Location	Contestants				
1–5	10 September 2012	Block One	Tim Burns	Danielle LeBlanc	Colleen Campbell	Sandra Latcham	Fraser Lang
6–10	17 September 2012	Block Two	Susan Haddow	Liz Wilkinson	Terry Lyons-Schram	Emma Pelliccione	Andy Noseworthy
11–15	24 September 2012	Block Three	Dan Yurman	Malaika Palmer	Clotilde Anne-Marie Friedmann	Mona Khorasani	Barry Arner
16–20	1 October 2012	Block Four	Rusty Stewart	Mitch McGraw	Shawna Fletcher	Jennifer Modica	Andrew Davids
21–25	15 October 2012	Block Five	Deb Slocum	Allison "Ali" Bisram	Paul E. Van Buskirk	Kirsten Slind-Jaklic	Emmanuel Pena
26–30	22 October 2012	Block Six	Janine Liberatore	Lewis Carlota	Piret "PJ" Jogeda	Jamie Godlin	Evyenia "Nia" Dempster
31–35	29 October 2012	Block Seven (Alberta)	Brett Lemay	Barbara Engelbart	Dajana Fabjanovich	Philippe Renoir	Jana Kelemen
36–40	5 November 2012	Block Eight (Hamilton)	Kathy Johnston-Henry	Justin Jones	Gillian Vander Vliet	Dragan Jankovic	Heather Aube
41–45	25 February 2013	Block Nine (PEI)	Michael Creighton	Alison Mills	David Jabbour	Nancy Stewart	Emma Rockett
46–50	4 March 2013	Block Ten (Oshawa)	Evelyn von Sichartshofen	Marcel Parent	Johnny Gough	Linda David	Pierre Paris
51–55	11 March 2013	Block Eleven	Erin Plasky	Richard Hatch	Lisa Del Core	Kate Salter	Rolf Kendra
56–60	18 March 2013	Waiters Block	Craig Abraham	Marsha Courneya	Ryan Egan	Jenevieve Narbay	Katherine McRae
61–65	25 March 2013	Block Thirteen	Carolyn Bickerton	Mary Brown	Matt Thompson	Bridgit Miezlaiskis	Lachlan McGurk
66–70	1 April 2013	Block Fourteen	Anne Bortolon	Amy Pagnucco	Shawn Collins	Nicole Pagnan	Chris McLoughlin
71–75	8 April 2013	Block Fifteen (911 Block)	Don Beam	Colin Copeland	Deana Velikov	Michael Kelly	Mark Litman
76–80	15 April 2013	Block Sixteen	Sara Meredith	Rick Simm	Dawn Muzzo	Edward Gal	Dustin Morrison

== Season 4 ==
Episodes	Premiered	Location	Contestants				
1–5	30 September 2013	Block 1 (BBQ Grill Master)	April Williams	Adam Whisler	Ron Robson	Kyla Turner	Raj Bhatia
6–10	7 October 2013	Block 2	Rose Fillcoff	Barbara Egarhos	James Currie	Katie Pitt	Myron Simic
11–15	14 October 2013	Block 3 (Oakville/Burlington)	Steve Lydon	Kelly Rossignol	Kate Park	Brad Koziey	Lisa Vrban
16–20	21 October 2013	Block 4 (Specialty Italian Challenge)	Mirella Martino	Erica Carnici	Lazzaro Cristiano Pisu	Lulu Lobuglio	Luigi Lou Desantis
21–25	28 October 2013	Block 5	Marise Muir	Christopher Bates	Drama En Sabah	Elaine Dandy	Heather Garand
26–30	4 November 2013	Block 6 (Hamilton)	Manon Marquis	Andrew Whitney	Tracie Thompson	Jenny Gladish	Brent Henderson
31–35	11 November 2013	Block 7 (Vancouver)	Syd Spencer	Nav Dhillon	Alessandro Limongelli	Rachel Schatz	Robin Yeager
36–40	18 November 2013	Block 8 (GTA Bacon Food Specialty)	Patterson Chojnaki	Atavia Surtees	Sherwin Modeste	Effie Tsergas	Greg Moar
41–45	27 January 2014	Block 9 (Newfoundland)	Krista Lee Hynes	Beverley "Bev" Pike	David A. Lush	Rebecca Puddester	John Bernard Riche
46–50	3 February 2014	Block 10	Alicja Kachnicz	Ruth Simpson	Nidhi Mahajan	Avni Lushaku	Dave Goode
51–55	10 February 2014	Block 11 (Ottawa)	Julia Goldblatt	Jill Hache	Joshua Abrams	John Villeneuve	Nicole Ducharme
56–60	17 February 2014	Block 12	Brenda Martin	Jahte Le	Ramon Octavio Suarez Cadena	Yasmin Islam	Martha O'Neill
61–65	24 February 2014	Block 13 (Niagara)	Karen Bishop	Maria Toye	George Mcpherson	Judy Marlow	Dominic Pisano
66–70	3 March 2014	Block 14	Marie Renaud	Tricia Warren	Minesh Dattani	Vicky Celestini	Larry Boccioletti
71–75	10 March 2014	Block 15	Glen Varvaro	Melssa Tiikanen	Madalena Longo	Penny Cavener	Marco Stabellini
76–80	17 March 2014	Block 16 (Extreme Theme)	Stephanie Wellinger	Rudy El Maghariki	Jason Furlano	Kelly Henderson	Kelly MacKay
