= Vegas Rat Rods =

Television series

- Also known as: Sin City Motors
- Genre: Reality
- Country of origin: United States
- Original language: English
- No. of seasons: 4
- No. of episodes: 48

Production
- Running time: 42 minutes
- Production company: Proper Television Inc.

Original release
- Network: Discovery Channel/ Dave (UK)
- Release: April 17, 2014 – October 30, 2018

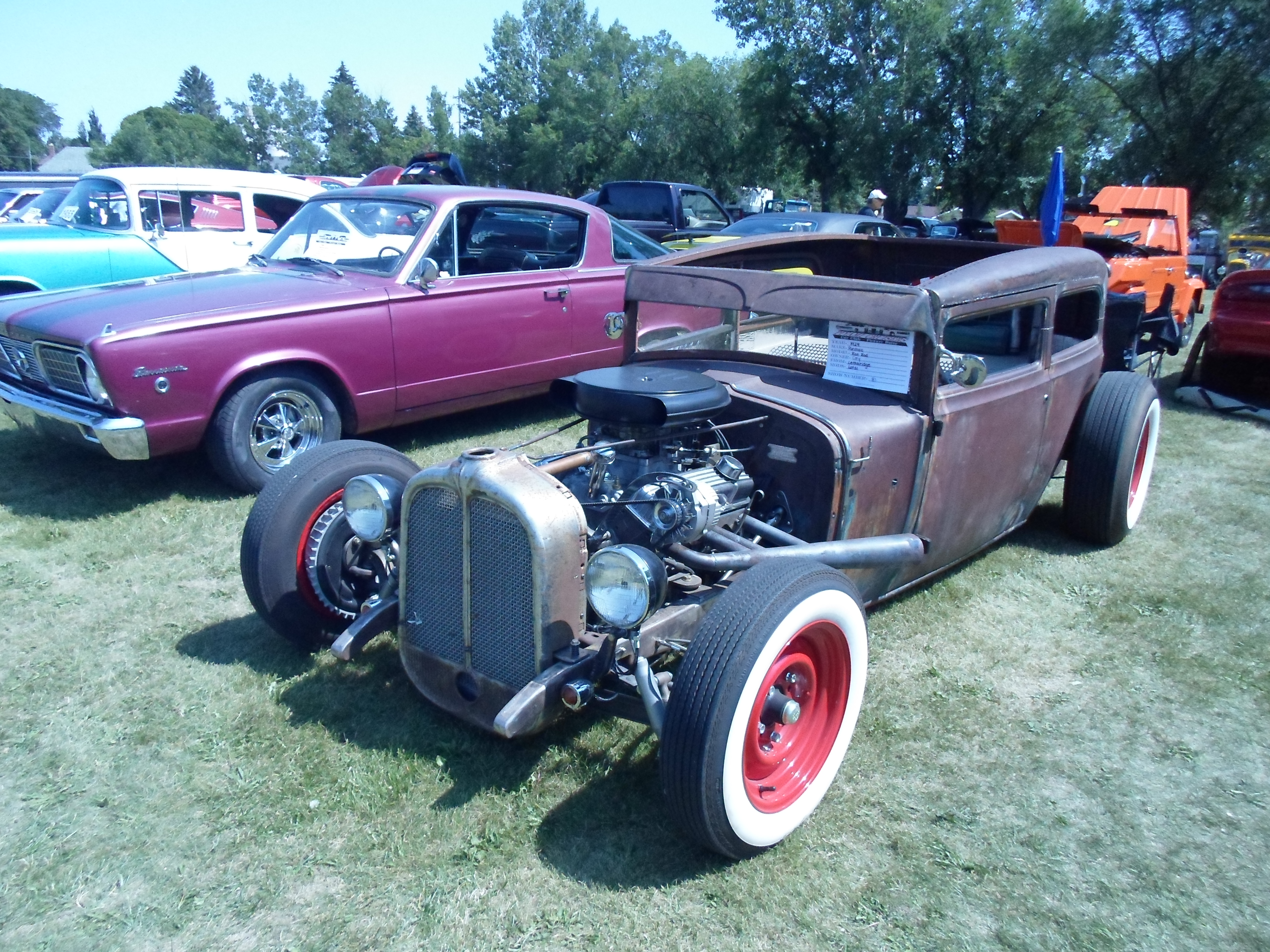
A rat rod by VRR

Vegas Rat Rods (known as Sin City Motors in some regions) is an American reality television series. The series premiered on April 17, 2014, on Discovery Channel. Season 5 due for release summer 2020.

== Series overview ==
Season	Episodes	Originally released	
Season	Episodes	First released	Last released
1	8	April 17, 2014	June 5, 2014
2	10	October 19, 2015	July 25, 2016
3	9	March 30, 2017	June 25, 2017
4	8	October 1, 2018	October 30, 2018

== Episodes ==
=== Season 1 (2014) ===
No. overall	No. in season	Title	Original release date
1	1	"Salt Flat Rod"	April 17, 2014
A 1931 Ford Model A is featured in the opener of this series, in which dilapidated autos are transformed into hot rods at a Las Vegas body shop.
2	2	"Ranch Rod"	April 24, 2014
Vintage Dodge trucks are used to build a hot rod.
3	3	"Electro Rod"	May 1, 2014
A 1928 Buick is featured.
4	4	"Mack Rod"	May 8, 2014
A 1938 Mack truck is converted into a hot rod.
5	5	"Tuxedo Rod"	May 15, 2014
A 1965 Lincoln Continental is featured.
6	6	"Pickup Rod"	May 22, 2014
A 1949 Ford F1 is featured.
7	7	"Fruit Rod"	May 29, 2014
A 1954 GMC COE truck is transformed.
8	8	"Bitchin' Rod"	June 5, 2014
Steve builds a hot rod for his younger brother.

=== Season 2 (2015–16) ===
No. overall	No. in season	Title	Original release date
9	1	"Wagon Rod"	October 19, 2015
In the Season 2 premiere, the Welderup crew transform a 1957 Chevy Wagon from a "grocery grabber" into a cool ride that's comfortable enough for a weekend adventure.
10	2	"Stampede Rod"	October 26, 2015
Steve and his team overhaul a 1931 Model A Ford golden gem from another era by installing a Cummins 4BT diesel engine, cool cowboy bling on the interior and a paint job that would make Henry Ford blush.
11	3	"Ditch Digger"	November 2, 2015
Steve and Co. rebuild a classic hauler for a family-run construction business.
12	4	"Franken Rod"	November 9, 2015
The Welderup crew turn a Chevy C10 into a true monster with rivets, scars and a wicked-cool Cummins diesel engine.
13	5	"Battle of the Model B"	November 16, 2015
Steve transforms a beloved 1932 Model B for an old-school client, turning this classic beauty into a roadworthy beast under the suspicious glare of a hotrod clan.
14	6	"To Hell You Ride"	November 23, 2015
The Welderup crew pay tribute to the railroad that put the West on the map by building a rat rod with a train theme for a client from Telluride. It's all about locomotives, rivets, and even a train whistle for this road warrior.
15	7	"Viva Las Vegas"	November 30, 2015
The crew transform a Speedster into a tribute to Las Vegas for a flashy client keen on cruising the Strip. Steve hunts down rare casino memorabilia to incorporate into the vehicle, including slot machine parts and poker chips.
16	8	"Desert Rat"	March 3, 2016
A beat-up sandrail gets a1920s body and a makeover.
17	9	"D-Rod Destroyer"	March 10, 2016
The famous D-Rod is reborn as The Destroyer when Steven and the crew give their iconic rat rod a badly needed badass makeover.
18	10	"Chevy Blaster"	July 25, 2016
Steve transforms a 1955 Chevy truck into an apocalyptic vision of fire.

=== Season 3 (2017) ===
No. overall	No. in season	Title	Original release date
19	1	"Freakshow on Wheels"	March 30, 2017
A cowboy is looking for a rat rod to lift the spirits of his small town; and Steve quickly lands on the idea of making a death-defying carnival ride on wheels.
20	2	"Timber Busting Diamond T"	April 6, 2017
Steve faces an uphill battle meeting his client's demands for a 1930s-era truck before acquiring an old friend's family heirloom Diamond T; and the work begins to transform a gutless work truck into a mountain-taming monster.
21	3	"Rock 'N' Rollin' Pickup"	April 13, 2017
Two bodyguards from Nashville prove to be tough customers when they ask Steve to redesign their Chevy truck into a bat out of hell for their impending wedding anniversary.
22	4	"Power Packing F100 Pickup"	April 20, 2017
An electrical lineman from Texas tasks Steve and the Welderup crew with customizing his company's first work truck, a trusty old early-1970s Ford pickup.
23	5	"Son of A..."	April 27, 2017
To appease a demanding new client, Steve aims to make a big-rig rat rod out of a 1979 Peterbilt that he once drove for his father's steel company.
24	6	"Water Rat"	May 1, 2017
A family man with a need for speed brings a battered 1950s-era pickup to Steve, looking for a rat rod the whole family can enjoy.
25	7	"Fuel to the Fire"	May 15, 2017
Restoring a 1930s-era fuel-delivery truck proves a big challenge when the crew discover a warped frame; and Steve ups the ante and insists that the resurrected tanker feature 21st-century technology with hydraulic brakes and run only on bio fuels.
26	8	"Shredding Metal"	May 22, 2017
A client comes to Steve with a pristinely-restored 1954 Tin Woody Wagon hoping the Welderup crew can make it cool, but when Steve's plans call for burning the car to achieve the look he's after, some on the team wonder if he's finally gone too far.
27	9	"Steel to Heal"	June 25, 2017
Welder Up general manager discovers his 2-year-old son has cancer, so Steve enlists the crew to build a custom vehicle that he hopes will show anyone who is battling the disease that there is life after the struggle.
