= Temple Street Productions =

Canadian production company

- Type: Division
- Industry: Film and television
- Founded: 1996
- Founders: Patrick Whitley; Sheila Hockin
- Defunct: 2020
- Fate: Folded into Boat Rocker Studios
- Headquarters: Toronto, Ontario, Canada
- Key people: David Fortier; Ivan Schneeberg
- Products: Television programs
- Parent: Boat Rocker Studios (2016–2020)

Temple Street Productions was a Toronto-based Canadian television & digital media production studio. Formed in 1996 by Patrick Whitley and Sheila Hockin, it was sold to Ivan Schneeberg and David Fortier—who had led the studio's drama unit since 2003—after Whitley's retirement from the industry. In 2015, a majority stake in the company was sold to Fairfax Financial; the following year, Temple Street was reorganized as Boat Rocker Media, with Temple Street becoming a unit of the new company. In 2020, Temple Street was closed and folded into Boat Rocker Studios' scripted division.

== History ==
Temple Street Productions was founded in 1996 by Patrick Whitley and Sheila Hockin. The Whitley and Hockin era saw production of Showtime co-production Queer as Folk and children's comedy Darcy’s Wild Life, as well as the first seasons of Canada’s Next Top Model and Billable Hours. In 2003, entertainment lawyers Ivan Schneeberg and David Fortier left Toronto law firm Goodmans LLP to enter the TV production business. Despite their lack of practical experience in television, they found employment with Temple Street, a former client of Goodmans, and used their legal expertise to produce the law office sitcom Billable Hours, written by another former Goodmans lawyer, Adam Till.

In July 2006 three years after Ivan Schneeberg and David Fortier joined Temple Street Productions as heads of its drama department, Temple Street Productions founders Patrick Whitley and Sheila Hockin sold their production outfit to its co-presidents & head of Temple Street Productions' scripted department arm Ivan Schneeberg and David Fortier, as Patrick Whitley retired from production, while Shelia Hockin became a freelance producer and continued to work with Temple Street Productions in a limited capacity. In Whitley and Hockin's last year, the company generated $32 million from production, making it the 13th-most profitable independent Canadian production company. Schneeberg and Fortier are joined by managing director John Young, who has been instrumental in the company's move to increase the output of digital media and branded content.

In 2009 and 2010, Temple Street was a key partner in The Remix Project, a social program to offer film and television production training to aspiring young filmmakers. The final result, a series of 10 short films, was screened at the TIFF Bell Lightbox in 2010 under the title City Life Film Project.

In June 2008, BBC Worldwide announced that they had acquired a 25% minority stake in Temple Street Productions for an undisclosed sum; as part of the agreement, BBC Worldwide received a first-look deal for international distribution rights to Temple Street's productions, while Temple Street received a first-look deal for developing Canadian adaptations of formats owned by BBC Worldwide, or whose Canadian rights are held by BBC Worldwide. In February 2011, Temple Street and BBC Worldwide America announced a development deal focused on factual television.

In June 2013, the company established a digital media division known as Temple Street Media Ventures, and a digital content studio known as Boat Rocker Studios. In July 2013, the company announced that it would open a new production office in Los Angeles, led by VP of factual entertainment Gerry McKean, and Tayfun King as U.S. head of factual entertainment marking Temple Street's first American production office outside of their Toronto-based studio.

In July 2015, Fairfax Financial made an investment in Temple Street, taking a majority stake. A month later in August of that year, the company entered the distribution operation by launching its distribution division named Temple Street Distribution with veteran producer Jon Rutherford leading the company's new distribution division as president with the new division signed a deal with Netflix to broadcast Temple Street's series Lost & Found Music Studios outside of Canada. In December 2015, Temple Street entered the animation production genre for the first time with the acquisition of a stake in Toronto-based animation studio Industrial Brothers, giving Temple Street their own animation studio whilst its distribution arm Temple Street Distribution will handle distribution to Industrial Brothers' projects.

In February 2016, Temple Street announced a reorganization, forming a new parent company known as Boat Rocker Media. Temple Street would become a unit of Boat Rocker Studios. Fortier and Schneeberg remained as co-executive chairman, and Temple Street managing director John Young was promoted to CEO. Schneeberg stated that the reorganization was meant to "bring clarity to the brand" as Boat Rocker expands into multi-platform operations.

In December 2020, Temple Street was closed and folded into Boat Rocker Studios' Los Angeles-based scripted division.

== Productions ==
Temple Street has developed a reputation for producing Canadian versions of American reality formats, such as Canada’s Next Top Model, Say Yes to the Dress: Canada

In 2013, Temple Street premiered Orphan Black, a sci-fi drama co-commissioned by Space and BBC America; the series would go on to become one of Temple Street's most successful productions, with lead actor Tatiana Maslany winning a Primetime Emmy Award for Outstanding Lead Actress in a Drama Series in 2016. Schneeberg and Fortier credited the show with “legitimizing” their production model, and recuperating the image of Canadian television abroad, where it was formerly seen as cheap and lacking in trans-national appeal.

Another notable production was its dance-themed teen drama The Next Step for Family Channel, which marked the highest-rated original series premiere in the network's history. The show would be sold to other international markets, and would spawn a live tour featuring its cast members.

=== Television ===
Title	Years	Network	Notes
Queer as Folk	2000–2001	Showcase; Showtime (United States)	co-production with Warner Bros. Television, Cowlip Productions, Channel 4 and Tony Jones Productions
Canada's Next Top Model	2006–2009	Citytv/CTV	co-production with CBS Studios International and May Street Productions
How Do You Solve a Problem Like Maria?	2008	CBC	
Wingin' It	2010–2012	Family Channel	co-production with BBC Worldwide Sales & Distribution; Originally titled Angel on Campus
Over the Rainbow Canada	2012	CBC	
Orphan Black	2013–2017	Space; BBC America (United States)	
Cook'd	2014	YTV	
Lost & Found Music Studios	2015–2017	Family Channel; Netflix (International)	co-production with Beachwood Canyon Productions
Cavendish	2019	CBC	co-production with Boat Rocker Rights, Holdfast Pictures, Bridge Burner Entertainment and Somebody Stop Productions

== Awards ==
Since 2009, Temple Street projects have earned 12 Canadian Screen Awards, 10 Gemini Awards, 4 Shaw Rocket Prizes, 2 AToMiC Awards, 2 EWwy Awards, 1 Canadian Comedy Award, 1 DGC Award, 1 WGC Screenwriting Award, 1 C21/Frapa Format Award, 1 Leo Award, 1 Peabody Award, and 1 Mention Spéciale du Jury Européen at Le 15e Festival de la Fiction TV.

In addition, executive producers David Fortier and Ivan Schneeberg received the Lionsgate/Maple Pictures Innovative Producer Award at the 2010 Banff World Television Awards for Temple Street's "incredible achievement in television and digital media."
