= Bunny Bop! =

Canadian children's web series

- Created by: Cheryl Wagner
- Written by: Cheryl Wagner & Harmony Wagner
- Directed by: Cheryl Wagner
- Narrated by: Laurel Smyth (as Grandma Bunny)
- Opening theme: "Come On, Let's Bunny Bop!"
- Composers: Harmony Wagner, Jason Rogerson, Dan Wagner
- Country of origin: Canada
- Original language: English
- No. of seasons: 1
- No. of episodes: 15

Production
- Executive producer: Cheryl Wagner
- Producer: Harmony Wagner
- Production location: Prince Edward Island
- Cinematography: Susan Rodgers
- Editor: Jason Rogerson
- Camera setup: Multi-camera
- Running time: 5 minutes
- Production company: Periscope Pictures

Original release
- Network: YouTube
- Release: January 31 – April 28, 2011

Bunny Bop! was a children's web series created and directed by Cheryl Wagner. The series bible and webisodes were written by Cheryl Wagner and Harmony Wagner. The theme song was written by Harmony Wagner.

Launched on February 3, 2011, at Bunnybop.com to coincide with the Chinese New Year of the Rabbit, Bunny Bop! is one of the first series to be produced with financial participation of the Independent Production Fund – Pilot Web Drama Fund.

== Synopsis ==
Bunny Bop! features preschool children dressed in bunny suits, often playing solo or in groups together. The series includes the children exploring wooden toys, doing activities like yoga or playing with blocks while interacting and having fun in a garden-like setting.

Each five-minute Bunny Bop! webisode includes a storybook segment, starring 'Buddy Bunny' a bouncy, carrot-loving puppet, as well as his friends 'Posey the Caterpillar' and 'Beep the Butterfly'. All the puppets are designs of Emmy Award–winning Karen Valleau, the production designer for both Bunny Bop! and The Big Comfy Couch.

The webseries includes original songs such as "Bunnies Love Bubbles", and a gentle voice-over narration by 'Grandma Bunny' (voiced by Laurel Smyth) with the help of some kids offscreen, to support an intentionally slow pace appropriate for viewers aged under three.

== Characters ==
Buddy Bunny is the main character of the series. He is an orange and cream colored bunny who likes to play, hop, learn and try new things, and eat carrots. He does not talk, but can interact by using his emotions and body language.

Posey the Caterpillar is a friend of Buddy Bunny's who is a female green caterpillar who likes to play and learn with Buddy. Like him, she too does not talk.

Beep the Butterfly is another friend of Buddy's who is a purple and yellow butterfly with pink, orange, navy, and light blue spots on her wings. She interacts, but only through noises and saying "beep".

The puppeteering for the characters was controlled by Harmony Wagner, Cecily Lalande, Matt Bowness, Nick Graveline, and Mindy Walker.

== Episodes ==
1. "Bongo Bunny" (January 31, 2011): Buddy Bunny uses a pail as a bongo drum to make music. Meanwhile, the Bunny Boppers make music of their own by playing with guitars and dancing.
2. "Super Buddy" (January 31, 2011): Buddy Bunny tries to fly like a superhero, but he realizes that he really can't fly.
3. "Where's Posey?" (February 1, 2011): The Bunny Boppers do yoga, play with a parachute, and build a block tower. While playing a game of hide and seek, Buddy Bunny can't seem to find Posey.
4. "Carrot Car" (February 8, 2011): Buddy Bunny uses a carrot as a toy car. However, he keeps eating other carrots, but then realizes that he must use a new carrot to make his car go by having self-control. Meanwhile, the Bunny Boppers try out new things, play with blocks, and play hopscotch.
5. "Bunny Garden" (February 14, 2011): The Bunny Boppers play on rocking horses while one of them measures the length of the horse. Special Song: "Buddy Bunny's Theme Song".
6. "Hoppy Birthday!" (February 21, 2011): The Bunny Boppers, Buddy Bunny, Posey, and Beep celebrate a big birthday party. Special Song: "Hoppy Birthday Buddy!"
7. "Bee Still" (March 3, 2011): A bumblebee flies around the garden, which frightens Buddy Bunny. But he learns to stay still so the bee won't bother him. Meanwhile, the Buddy Boppers paint, clean up, and dance.
8. "Funny Bunny" (March 10, 2011): Buddy Bunny wants to play and make Beep and Posey laugh, but they are too busy. Then, Buddy makes flower glasses to make them laugh.
9. "Yummy!" (March 17, 2011): The Bunny Boppers eat carrots for their snack. Meanwhile, Buddy Bunny learns about healthy foods through a song.
10. "Windy Day" (March 24, 2011): It's a very windy day at the garden. Special Song: "Bunnies Love Bubbles".
11. "Somebunny Needs A Nap" (March 31, 2011): The Bunny Boppers color and do yoga. Buddy Bunny is very tired and wants to take a nap. Special Song: "Somebunny Needs a Hug".
12. "Somebunny is Sorry" (April 6, 2011): The Bunny Boppers play with blocks and balls. Buddy surprises Posey and Beep, which frightens them. He apologizes for what he did afterwards. Special Song: "When I Grow Up"
13. "Sneaky Feet" (April 13, 2011): The Bunny Boppers take turns while playing. Meanwhile, Buddy Bunny gets the hiccups while he paints. Beep the butterfly tickles him to cure his hiccups. Special Song: "Sneaky Bunny".
14. "Peek-a-Boo!" (April 21, 2011): The Bunny Boppers play with a parachute, but one of them falls asleep. Then, they decide to play under the parachute. The Bunny Boppers also go on a carrot scavenger hunt. Special Song: "Buddy Bunny's Theme Song".
15. "Quiet Time" (April 28, 2011): A Bunny Bopper cleans up the garden. Buddy Bunny wants to read quietly, but is interrupted by Posey carrying a large blue watering can. Instead, Buddy shows him his book and they read together. Special Song: "Time to Have a Rest".

== Merchandise ==
On the Bunny Bop website, there is a "Bop Shop" which has merchandise from the show, such as bunny hats, bunny pajamas, Bunny Buddy dolls, and a soft blue parachute.

=== Media ===
A DVD containing all 15 episodes was released shortly after the show's demise. A CD featuring the special songs, including the theme song, from the show were also released on June 11, 2013. The songs can also be downloaded into MP3 form.

== Trivia ==
The puppet used for Posey the caterpillar made a cameo appearance on The Big Comfy Couch in the episode "Full of Life" long before Bunny Bop aired. At the time of his cameo, he was unnamed.
