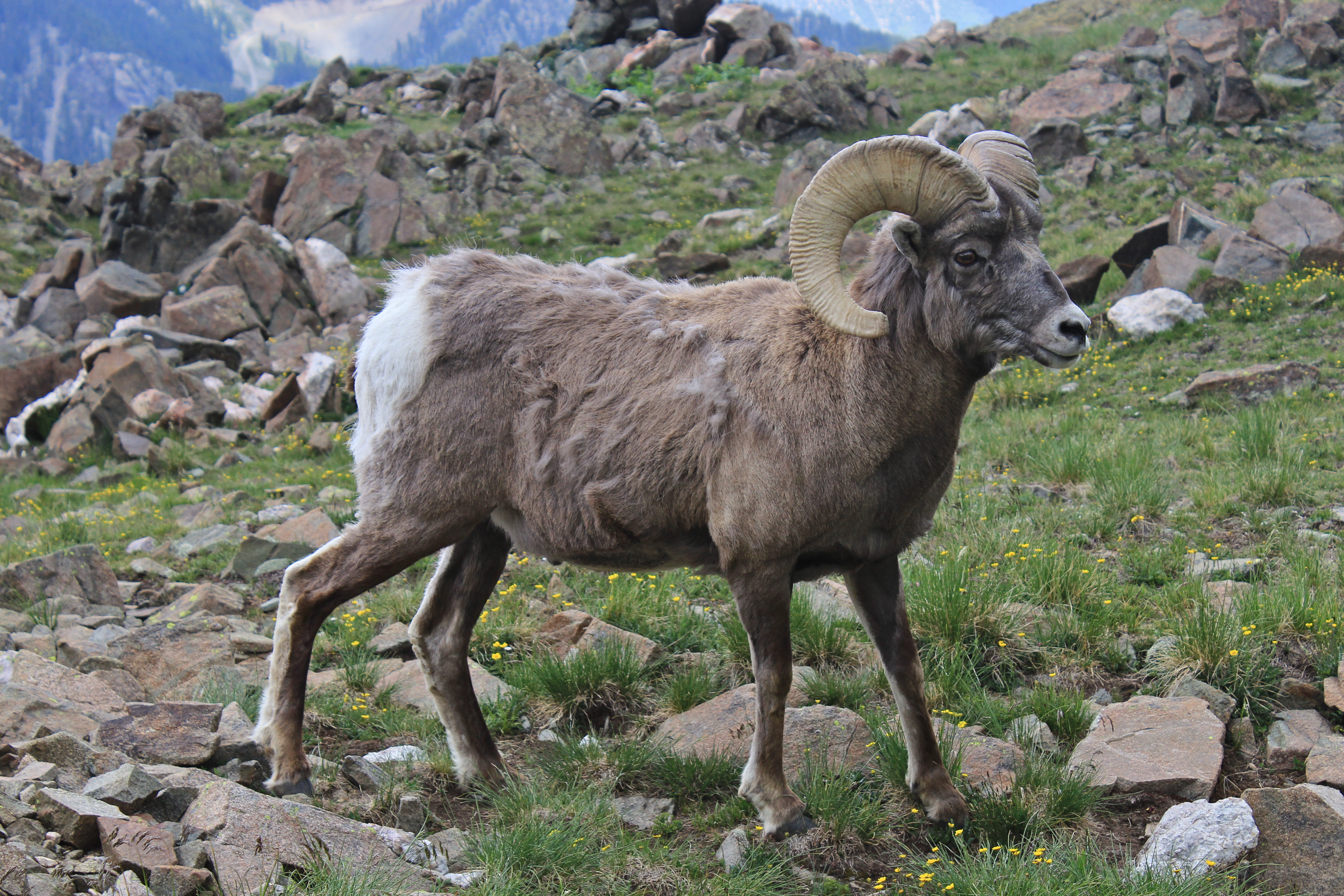
- Male (ram), Wheeler Peak, New Mexico
- Female (ewe), Banff National Park, AB

Conservation status
- Least Concern (IUCN 3.1)
- CITES Appendix II (Note: Only the population of Mexico.)

Scientific classification
- Kingdom: Animalia
- Phylum: Chordata
- Class: Mammalia
- Order: Artiodactyla
- Family: Bovidae
- Subfamily: Caprinae
- Genus: Ovis
- Species: O. canadensis

Binomial name
- Ovis canadensis Shaw, 1804
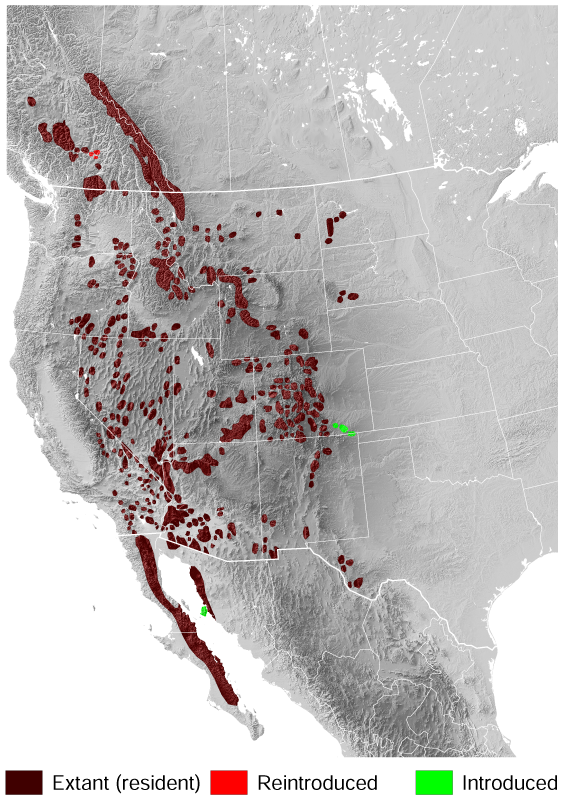
- Bighorn sheep range

Synonyms
- O. cervina Desmarest; O. montana Cuvier

= Bighorn sheep =

Bighorn sheep Temporal range: 0.7–0 Ma Middle Pleistocene – recent

Species of sheep native to North America

The bighorn sheep (Ovis canadensis) or bighorn is a species of sheep native to North America. It is named for its large horns, a pair of them may weigh up to 14 kg (30 lb); the sheep altogether typically weigh up to 143 kg (315 lb). Recent genetic testing indicates three distinct subspecies of Ovis canadensis, one of which is endangered: O. c. sierrae.

Sheep originally crossed to North America over the Bering Land Bridge from Siberia; the population in North America peaked in the millions, and the bighorn sheep entered into the mythology of Native Americans. By 1900, the population had crashed to several thousand due to diseases introduced through European livestock and overhunting.

== Taxonomy and genetics ==
Ovis canadensis is one of two species of mountain sheep in North America; the other species being O. dalli, the Dall sheep. Wild sheep crossed the Bering land bridge from Siberia into Alaska during the Pleistocene (about 750,000 years ago); subsequently, they spread through western North America as far south as Baja California and northwestern mainland Mexico. Divergence from their closest Asian ancestor (snow sheep) occurred about 600,000 years ago. In North America, wild sheep diverged into two extant species — Dall sheep, which occupy Alaska and northwestern Canada, and bighorn sheep, which range from southwestern Canada to Mexico. However, the status of these species is questionable given that hybridization has occurred between them in their recent evolutionary history.

=== Former subspecies ===
In 1940, Ian McTaggart-Cowan split the species into seven subspecies, with the first three being mountain bighorns and the last four being desert bighorns:

- Rocky Mountain bighorn sheep, O. c. canadensis, found from British Columbia to Arizona.
- †Badlands bighorn sheep (or Audubon's bighorn sheep), O. c. auduboni, occurred in North Dakota, South Dakota, Montana, Wyoming, and Nebraska. This subspecies has been extinct since 1925.
- California bighorn sheep, O. c. californiana, found from British Columbia south to California and east to North Dakota. The definition of this subspecies has been updated (see below).
- Desert bighorn sheep, O. c. nelsoni, the most common desert bighorn sheep, ranges from California through Arizona and in west Texas as the result of conservation and re-introduction efforts.
- Mexican bighorn sheep, O. c. mexicana, ranges from Arizona and New Mexico south to Sonora and Chihuahua.
- Peninsular bighorn sheep O. c. cremnobates, occur in the Peninsular Ranges of California and Baja California
- Weems' bighorn sheep, O. c. weemsi, found in southern Baja California.

=== Current subspecies ===
Female O. c. canadensis Banff National Park

Starting in 1993, Ramey and colleagues, using DNA testing, have shown this division into seven subspecies is largely illusory. Most scientists currently recognize three subspecies of bighorn. This taxonomy is supported by the most extensive genetics (microsatellite and mitochondrial DNA) study to date (2016) which found high divergence between Rocky Mountain and Sierra Nevada bighorn sheep, and that these two subspecies both diverged from desert bighorn before or during the Illinoian glaciation (about 315–94 thousand years ago). Thus, the three subspecies of O. canadensis are:

- Rocky Mountain bighorn sheep (O. c. canadensis) – occupying the U.S. and Canadian Rocky Mountains, and the Northwestern United States.
- Sierra Nevada bighorn sheep (O. c. sierrae) – formerly California bighorn sheep, a genetically distinct subspecies that only occurs in the Sierra Nevada in California. However, historic observer records suggest that bighorn sheep may have ranged as far west as the California Coastal Ranges, which are contiguous to the Sierra Nevada via the Transverse Ranges. An account of "wild sheep" in the vicinity of the Mission San Antonio near Jolon, California and the mountains around San Francisco Bay dates to circa 1769.
- Desert bighorn sheep (O. c. nelsoni) – occurring throughout the desert regions of the Southwestern United States and Northwestern Mexico. The 2016 genetics study suggested a more modest divergence of this desert bighorn sheep into three lineages consistent with the earlier work of Cowan: Nelson's (O. c. nelsoni), Mexican (O. c. mexicana), and Peninsular (O. c. cremnobates). These three lineages occupy desert biomes that vary significantly in climate, suggesting exposure to different selection regimens.

In addition, two populations are currently considered endangered by the United States government:

- Sierra Nevada bighorn sheep (O. c. sierrae),
- Peninsular bighorn sheep, a distinct population segment of desert bighorn sheep (O. c. nelsoni)

== Description ==
A juvenile (lamb), Kootenay National Park, BC

Bighorn sheep are named for the large, curved horns borne by the rams (males). Ewes (females) also have horns, but they are shorter and straighter. They range in color from light brown to grayish or dark, chocolate brown, with a white rump and lining on the backs of all four legs. Males typically weigh 58–143 kg (128–315 lb), are 90–105 cm (35–41 in; 2.95–3.44 ft) tall at the shoulder, and 1.6–1.85 m (63–73 in; 5.2–6.1 ft) long from the nose to the tail. Females are typically 34–91 kg (75–201 lb), 75–90 cm (30–35 in; 2.46–2.95 ft) tall, and 1.28–1.58 m (50–62 in; 4.2–5.2 ft) long. Male bighorn sheep have large horn cores, enlarged cornual and frontal sinuses, and internal bony septa. These adaptations serve to protect the brain by absorbing the impact of clashes. Bighorn sheep have preorbital glands on the anterior corner of each eye, inguinal glands in the groin, and pedal glands on each foot. Secretions from these glands may support dominance behaviors.

Bighorns from the Rocky Mountains are relatively large, with males that occasionally exceed 230 kg (500 lb) and females that exceed 90 kg (200 lb). In contrast, Sierra Nevada bighorn males weigh up to only 90 kg (198 lb) and females to 60 kg (132 lb). Males' horns can weigh up to 14 kg (30 lb), as much as all the bones in the male's body.

== Natural history ==
=== Ecology ===
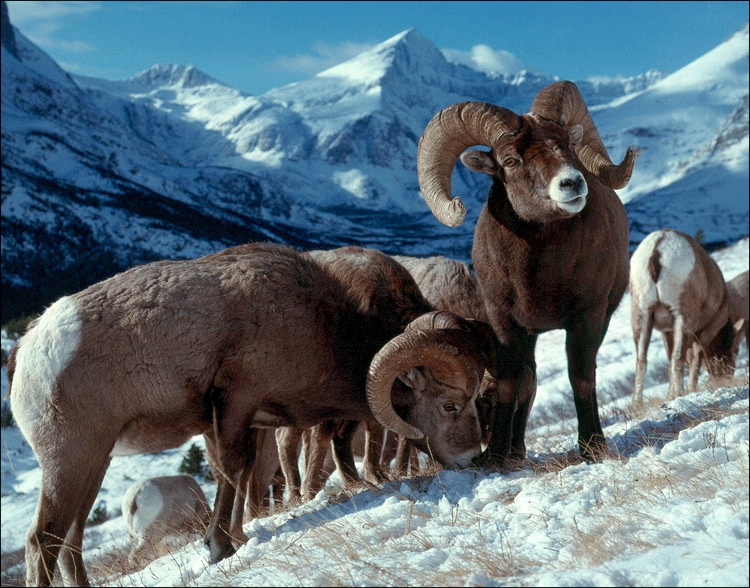
Bighorn rams

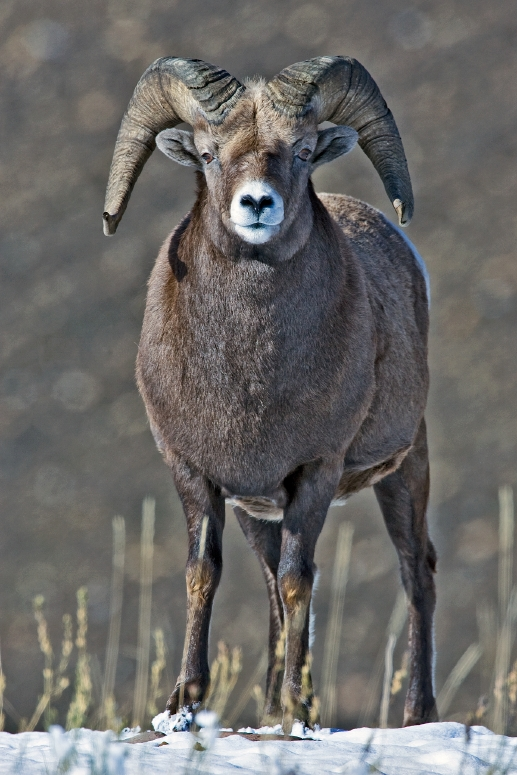
A bighorn ram near Jasper, Alberta

The Rocky Mountain and Sierra Nevada bighorn sheep occupy the cooler mountainous regions of Canada and the United States. In contrast, the desert bighorn sheep subspecies are indigenous to the hot desert ecosystems of the Southwestern United States and Mexico. Bighorn sheep inhabit alpine meadows, grassy mountain slopes, and foothill country near rugged, rocky cliffs and bluffs. Since bighorn sheep cannot move through deep snow, they prefer drier slopes, where the annual snowfall is less than about 150 cm (60 in) per year. A bighorn's winter range usually has lower elevations than its summer range.

Bighorn sheep are highly susceptible to certain diseases carried by domestic sheep, such as psoroptic scabies and pneumonia; additional mortality occurs as a result of accidents involving rock falls or falling off cliffs (a hazard of living in steep, rugged terrain). Bighorns are well adapted to climbing steep terrain, where they seek cover from predators. Lambs are the most susceptible to predation, with potential predators including coyotes, bobcats, gray foxes, wolverines, jaguars, ocelots, lynxes, and golden eagles.

Bighorn sheep of all ages are threatened by black bears, grizzly bears, wolves, and especially mountain lions, which are perhaps best equipped with the agility to prey on them in uneven, rocky habitats. Fire suppression techniques may limit visibility through shrublands, and therefore increase cover and predation rates by mountain lions. Bighorn sheep are considered good indicators of land health because the species is sensitive to many human-induced environmental problems. In addition to their aesthetic value, bighorn sheep are considered desirable game animals by hunters.

Bighorn sheep graze on grasses and browse shrubs, particularly in fall and winter, and seek minerals at natural salt licks. Females tend to forage and walk, possibly to avoid predators and protect lambs, while males tend to eat and then rest and ruminate, which lends to more effective digestion and greater increase in body size.

=== Social structure and reproduction ===
Bighorn sheep live in large herds and do not typically follow a single leader ram, unlike the mouflon, the ancestor of the domestic sheep, which has a strict dominance hierarchy. Before the mating season or "rut", the rams attempt to establish a dominance hierarchy to determine access to ewes for mating. During the pre-rut period, most of the characteristic horn clashing occurs between rams, although this behavior may occur to a limited extent throughout the year. Bighorn rams exhibit agonistic behavior: two competitors walk away from each other and then turn to face each other before jumping and lunging into headbutts. Rams' horns are often missing their tips, or "broomed". Broomed horns are a natural consequence of frequent sparring between rams. Females exhibit a stable, nonlinear hierarchy that correlates with age. Females may fight for high social status when they are integrated into the hierarchy at one to two years of age.

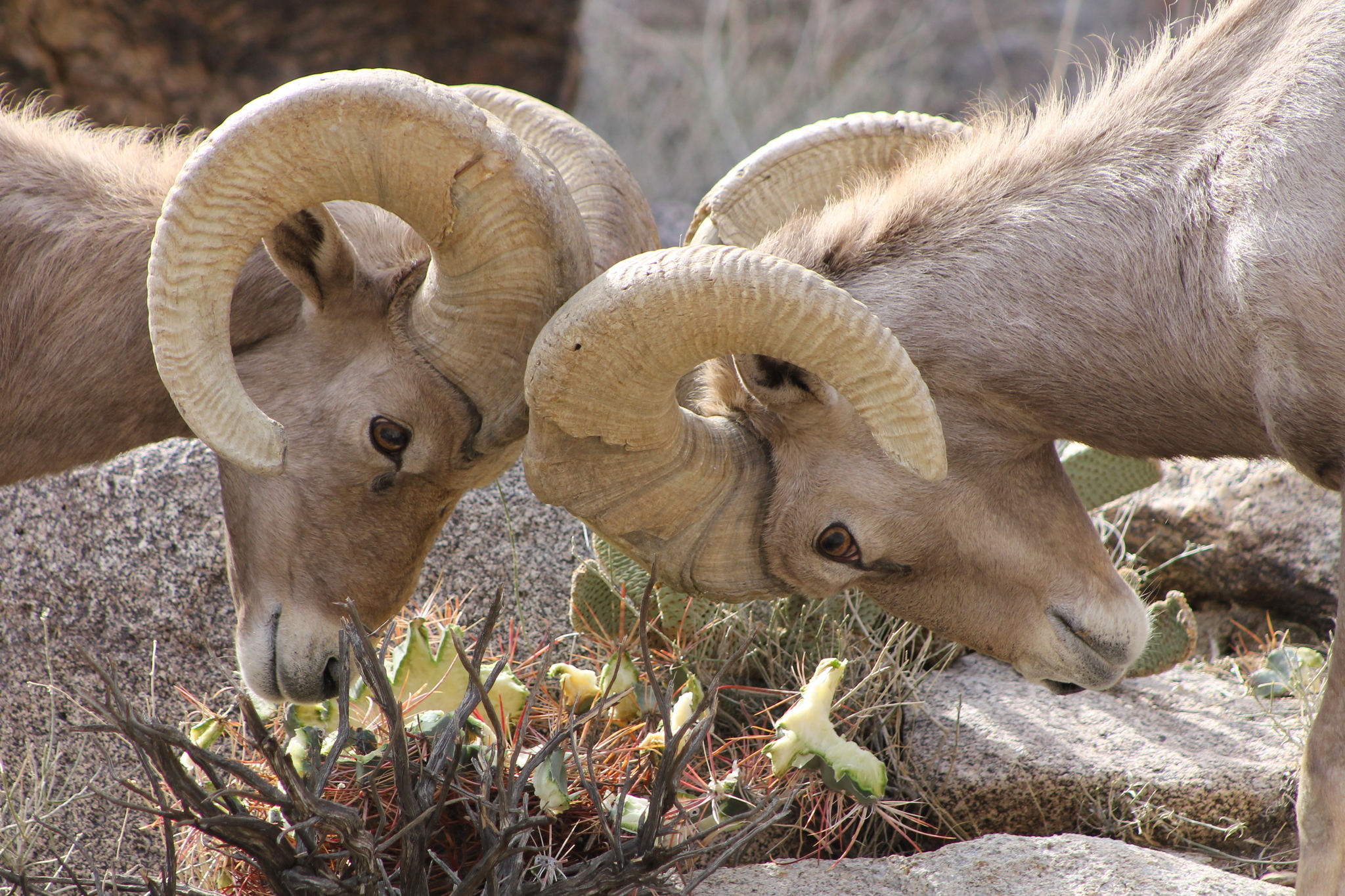

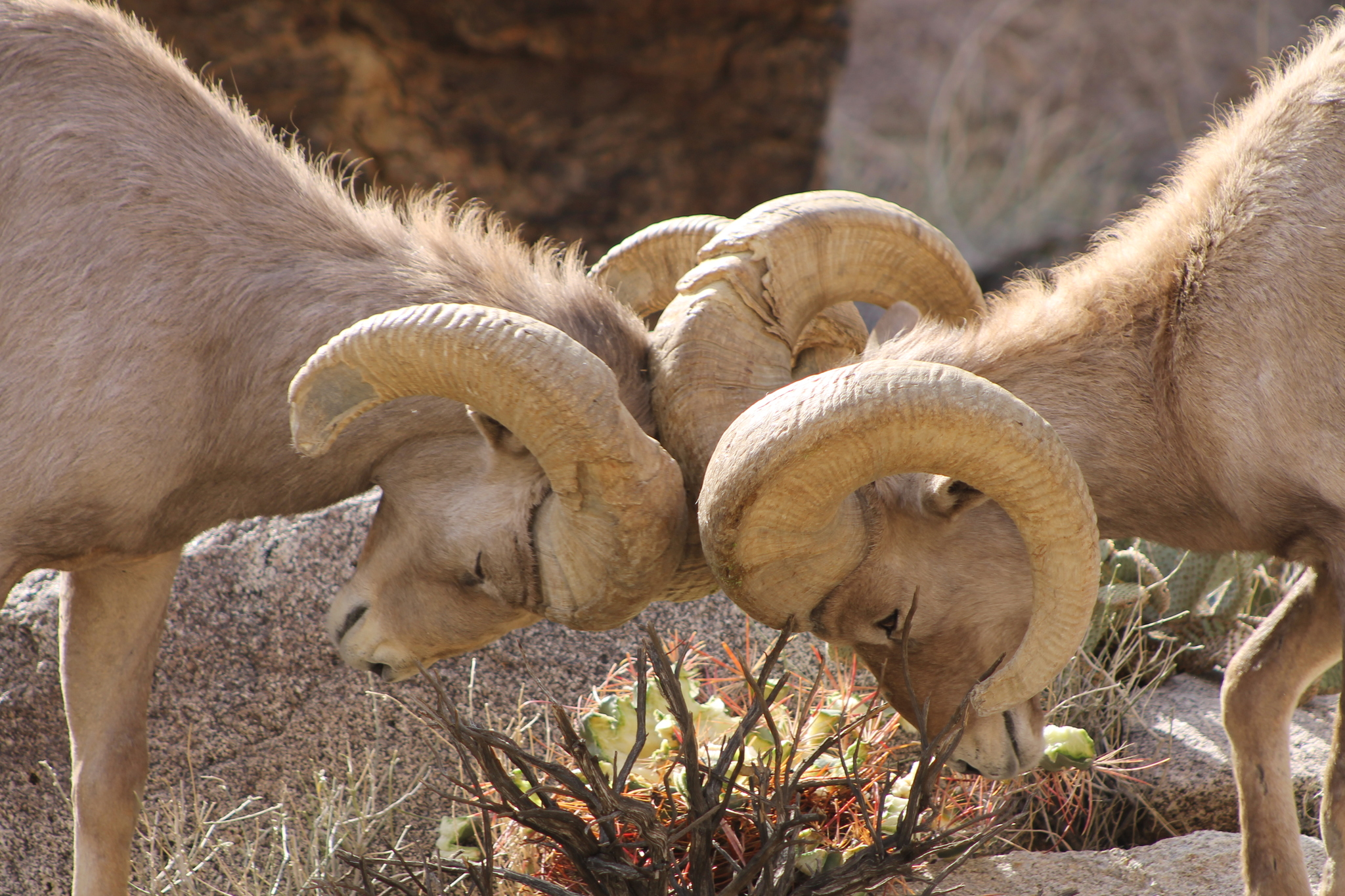
Rams butting heads, in California

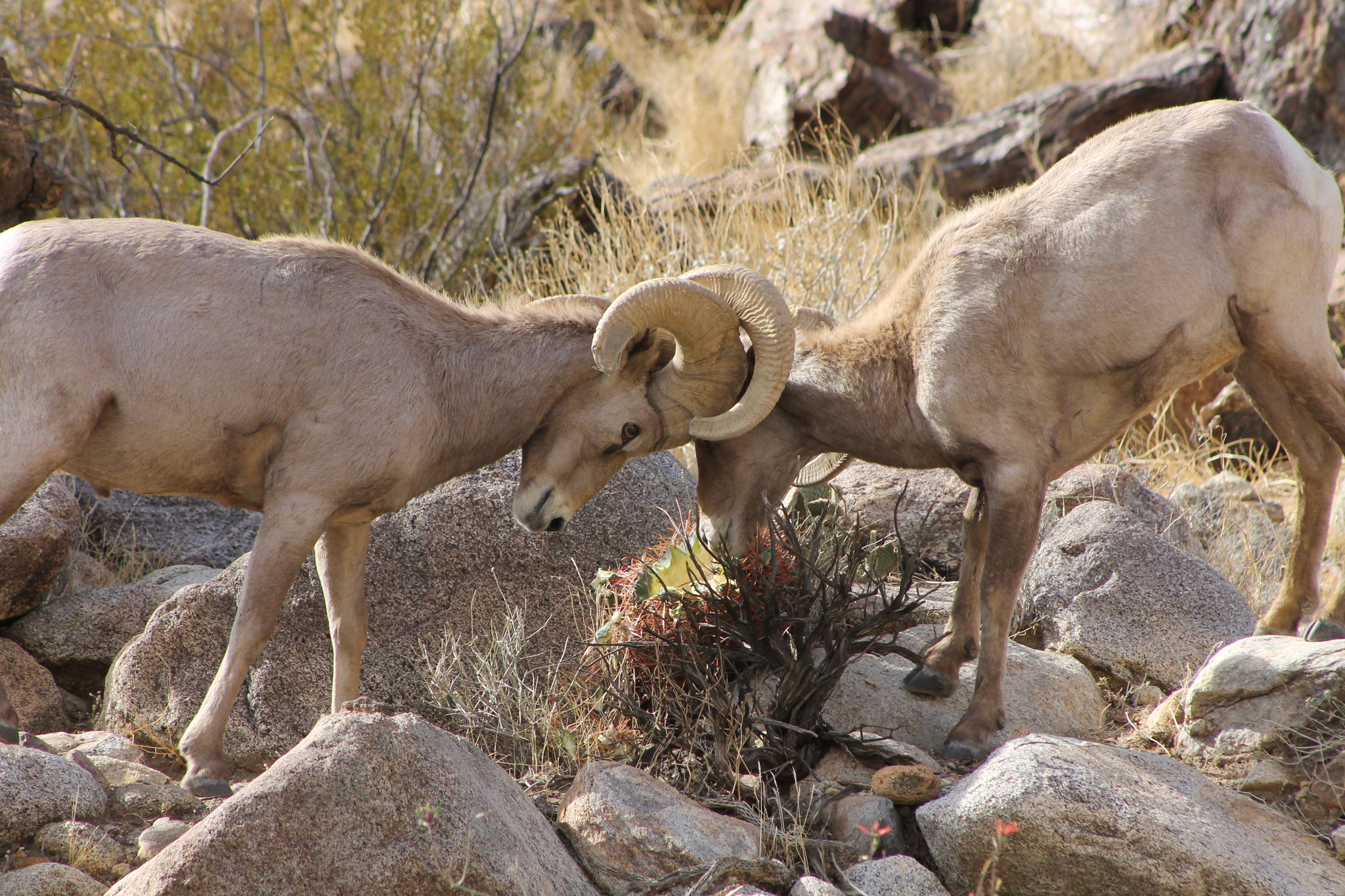

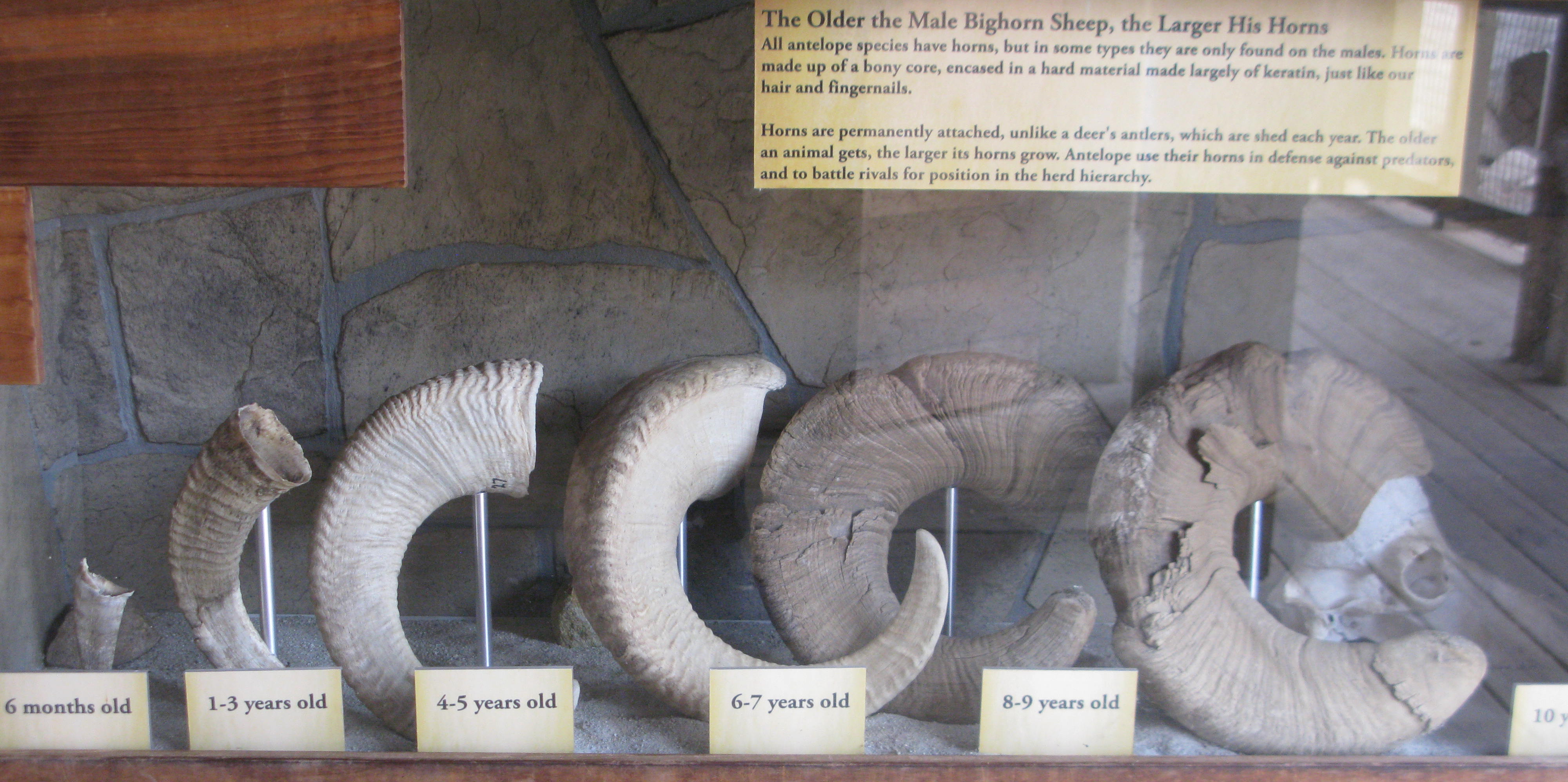
Horns through ontogeny

Rocky Mountain bighorn rams employ at least three different courting strategies. The most common and successful is the tending strategy, in which a ram follows and defends an estrous ewe. Tending takes considerable strength and vigilance, and ewes are most receptive to tending males, presumably feeling they are the most fit. Another tactic is coursing, when rams fight for an already tended ewe. Ewes typically avoid coursing males, so the strategy is ineffective. The rams also employ a blocking strategy. They prevent a ewe from accessing tending areas before she even enters estrus.

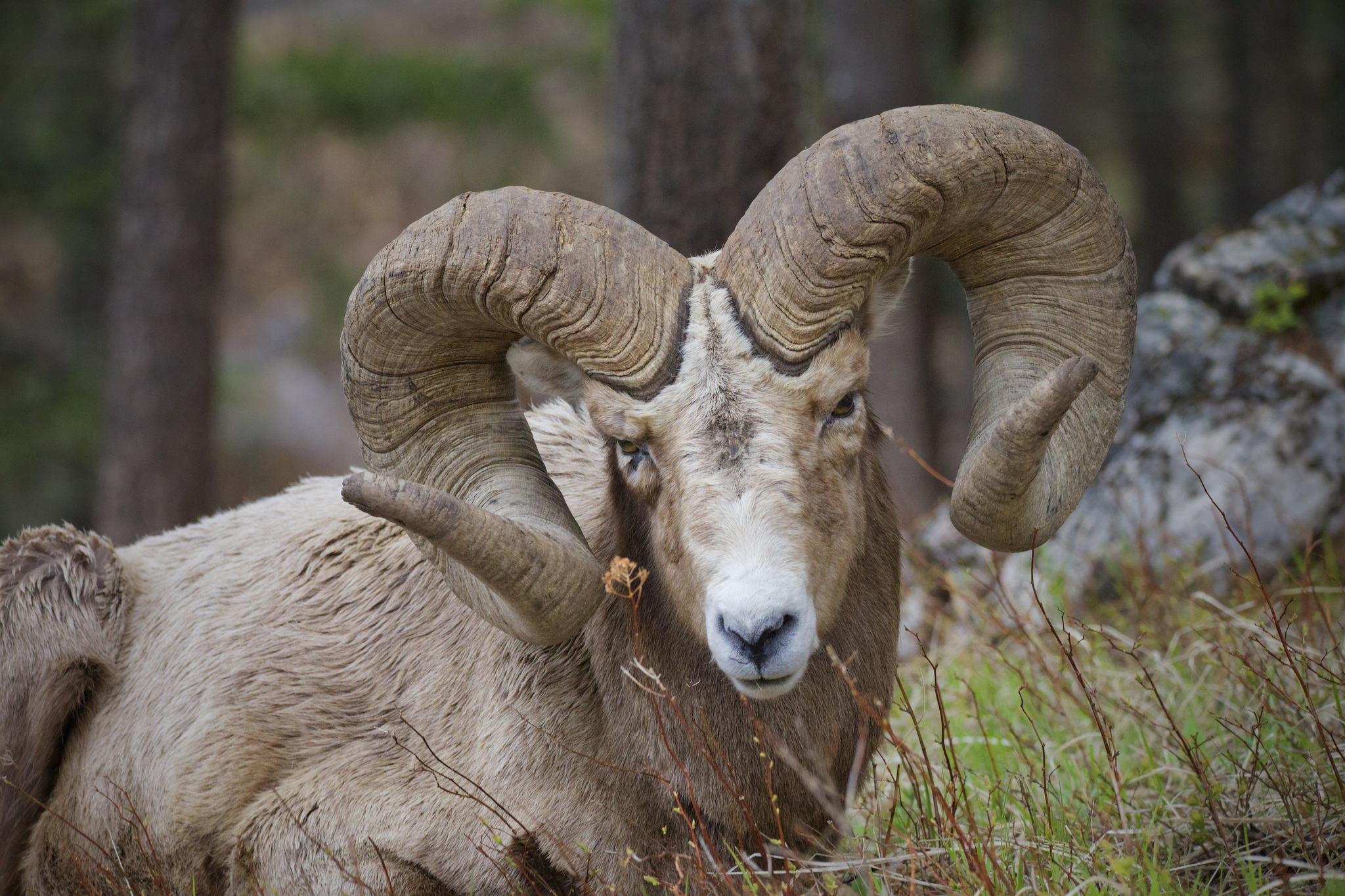
15-year-old bighorn ram, in Alberta. Nicknamed the "King of Waterton", he died shortly after this photo was taken.

Bighorn ewes have a six-month gestation. In temperate climates, the peak of the rut occurs in November, with one, or rarely two, lambs being born in May. Most births occur in the first two weeks of the lambing period. Pregnant ewes of the Rocky Mountains migrate to alpine areas in spring, presumably to give birth in areas safer from predation, but are away from areas with good quality forage. Lambs born earlier in the season are more likely to survive than lambs born later. Lambs born late may not have access to sufficient milk, as their mothers are lactating at a time when food quality is lower. Newborn lambs weigh from 3.6 to 4.5 kg (8 to 10 lb) and can walk within hours. The lambs are then weaned when they reach four to six months old. The lifespan of ewes is typically 10–14 years and 9–12 years for rams.

=== Infectious disease ===
Many bighorn sheep populations in the United States experience regular outbreaks of infectious pneumonia, which likely result from the introduction of bacterial pathogens (in particular, Mycoplasma ovipneumoniae, and some strains of Mannheimia haemolytica) carried asymptomatically in domestic sheep. Once introduced, pathogens can transmit rapidly through a bighorn population, resulting in all-age die-offs that sometimes kill up to 90% of the population. In the years following pathogen introduction, bighorn populations frequently experience multiple years of lamb pneumonia outbreaks. These outbreaks can severely limit recruitment and likely play a powerful role in slowing population growth.

== Relationship with humans ==
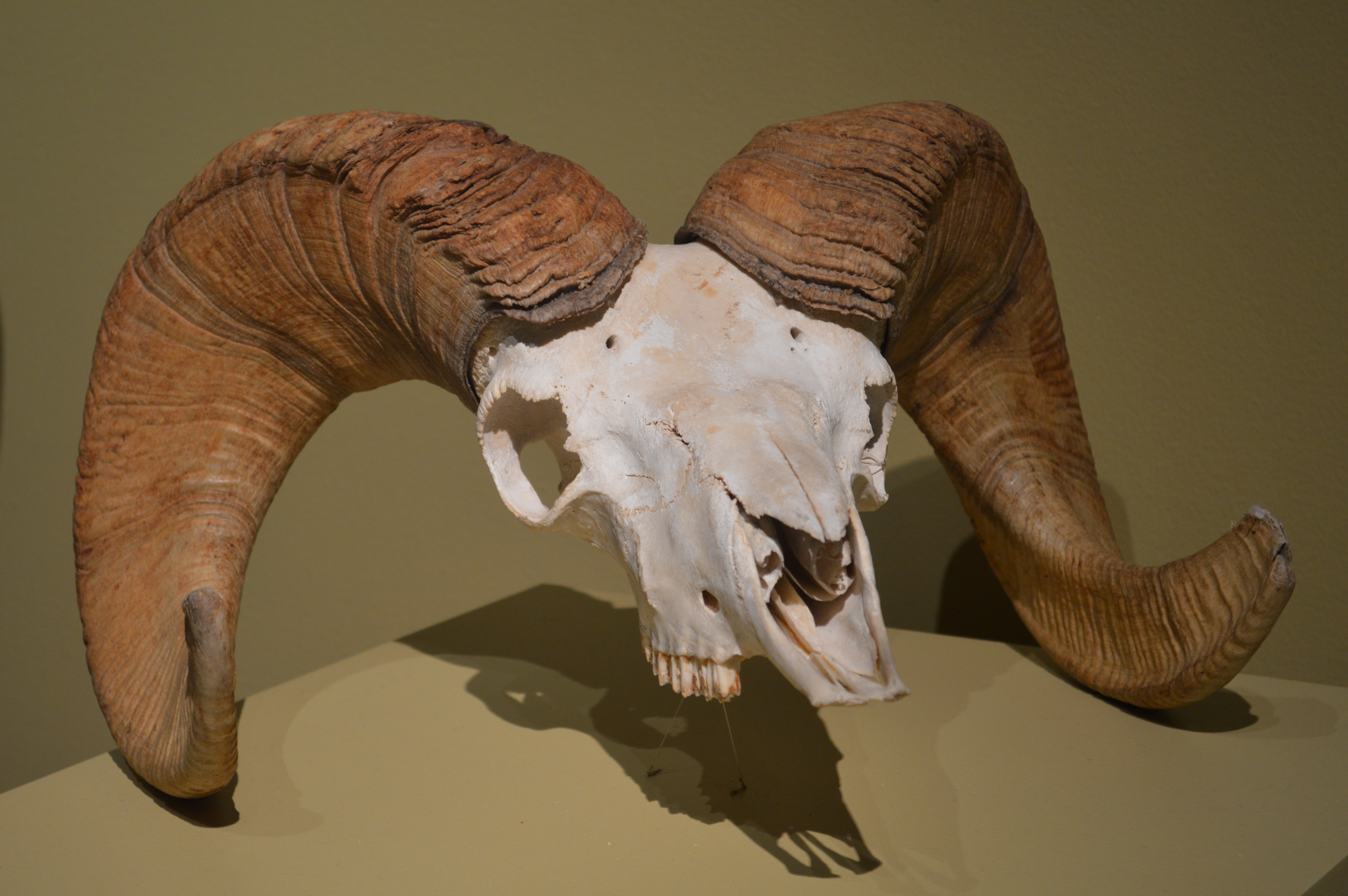
Bighorn ram skull

=== Conservation ===
Bighorn sheep were widespread throughout the western United States, Canada, and northern Mexico two hundred years ago. The population was estimated to be 150,000 to 200,000. Unregulated hunting, habitat destruction, overgrazing of rangelands, and diseases contracted from domestic livestock all contributed to the decline, the most drastic occurring from about 1870 through 1950.

In 1936, the Arizona Boy Scouts mounted a statewide campaign to save the bighorn sheep. The scouts first became interested in the sheep through the efforts of Major Frederick Russell Burnham. Burnham observed that fewer than 150 of these sheep still lived in the Arizona mountains. The National Wildlife Federation, the Izaak Walton League, and the National Audubon Society also joined the effort. On January 18, 1939, over 600,000 hectares (1,500,000 acres) of land were set aside to create the Kofa National Wildlife Refuge and the Cabeza Prieta National Wildlife Refuge.

Many state and federal agencies have actively pursued the restoration of bighorn sheep since the 1940s. However, these efforts have met with limited success, and most of the historical range of bighorns remains unoccupied. Hunting for male bighorn sheep is allowed, but heavily regulated, in Canada and the United States.

=== In culture ===
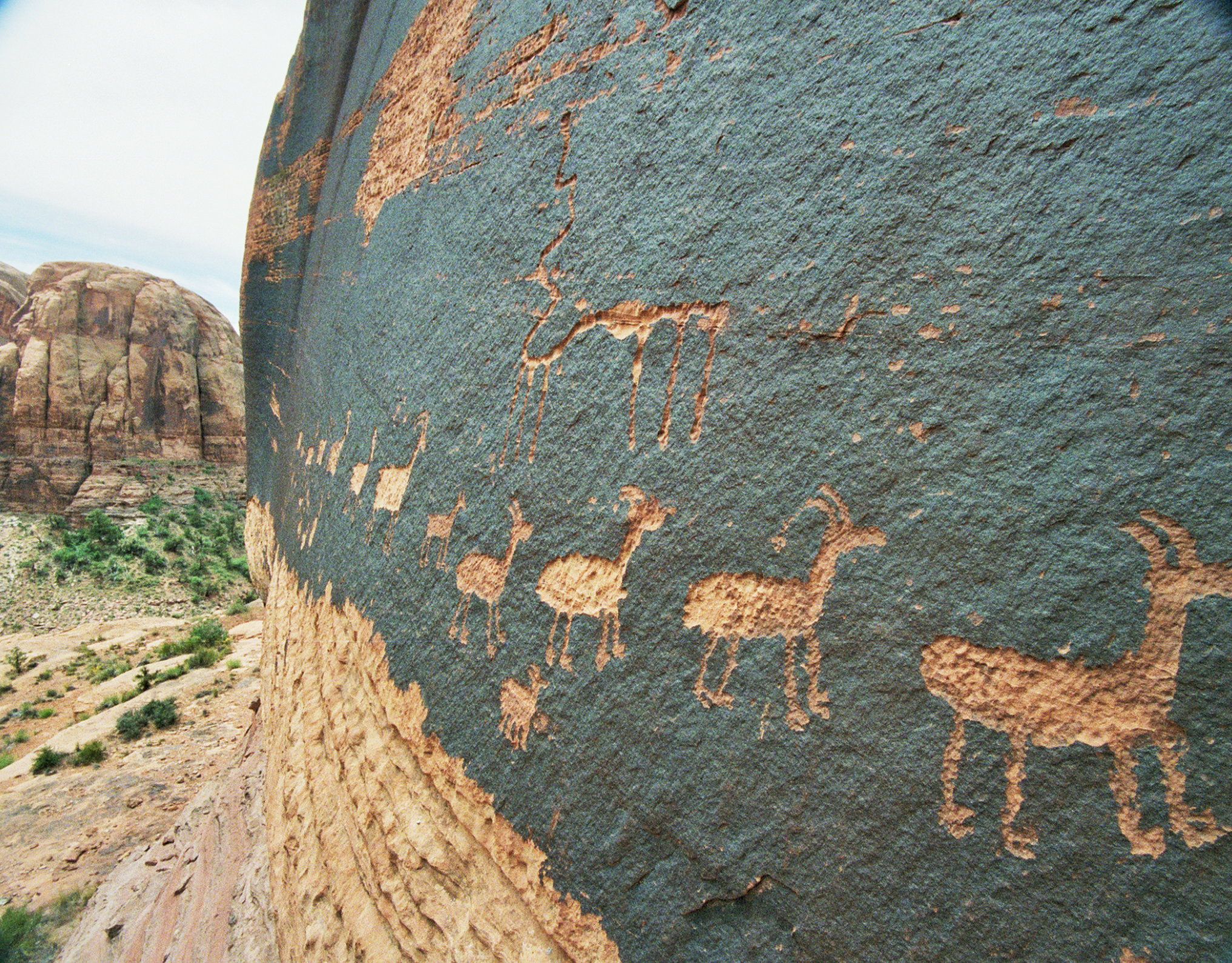
A petroglyph of a caravan of bighorn sheep near Moab, Utah, United States, a common theme in glyphs from the desert southwest

Bighorn sheep were among the most admired animals of the Apsaalooka (Crow) people, and what is today called the Bighorn Mountain Range was central to the Apsaalooka tribal lands. In the Bighorn Canyon National Recreation Area book, storyteller Old Coyote describes a legend related to the bighorn sheep. A man possessed by evil spirits attempts to kill his heir by pushing the young man over a cliff, but the victim is saved by getting caught in trees. Rescued by bighorn sheep, the man takes the name of their leader, Big Metal. The other sheep grant him power, wisdom, sharp eyes, sure-footedness, keen ears, great strength, and a strong heart. Big Metal returns to his people with the message that the Apsaalooka people will survive only so long as the river winding out of the mountains is known as the Bighorn River.

Bighorn sheep are hunted for their meat and horns, used in ceremonies, as food, and as hunting trophies. They also serve as a source of ecotourism, as tourists come to see the bighorn sheep in their native habitat.

The Rocky Mountain bighorn sheep is the provincial mammal of Alberta and the state animal of Colorado and, as such, is incorporated into the symbol for the Colorado Division of Parks and Wildlife. The Desert bighorn sheep is the state mammal of Nevada.

The Bighorn sheep was featured in the children's book Buford the Little Bighorn (1967) by Bill Peet. The Bighorn sheep named Buford has a huge pair of horns in the Spring, Summer, Fall, and Winter, similar to Rudolph the Red-Nosed Reindeer.

Bighorn sheep were once known by the scientific identification "argali" or "argalia" due to assumption that they were the same animal as the Asiatic argali (Ovis ammon). Lewis and Clark recorded numerous sightings of O. canadensis in the journals of their exploration—sometimes using the name argalia. In addition, they recorded the use of bighorn sheep horns by the Shoshone in making composite bows. William Clark's Track Map produced after the expedition in 1814 indicated a tributary of the Yellowstone River named Argalia Creek and a tributary of the Missouri River named Argalia River, both in what is today Montana. Neither of these tributaries retained these names, however. The Bighorn River, another tributary of the Yellowstone, and its tributary stream, the Little Bighorn River, were both indicated on Clark's map and did retain their names, the latter being the namesake of the Battle of the Little Bighorn.

The Bighorn Ram was featured in a series of prints by artist Andy Warhol. In 1983, the artist was commissioned to create a portfolio of ten endangered species to raise environmental awareness. The portfolio, known as "Endangered Species" was created in support of the Endangered Species Act, which was passed by the U.S. Congress in 1973. Other animals within the portfolio include the Siberian tiger, bald eagle and the giant panda.
