= Fry Medal =

Canadian zoology award

The F. E. J. Fry Medal is an annual award for zoology given by the Canadian Society of Zoologists.

It is presented to "the Canadian zoologist who has made an outstanding contribution to knowledge and understanding of an area in zoology". The recipient is expected to give a lecture at the next annual conference.

The award was established in 1974 in honour of Frederick E.J. Fry, the Canadian ichthyologist and aquatic ecologist, in recognition of his contribution to science in Canada.

== Recipients ==
- Source

Year	Recipient	Lecture title
2023	Katie Gilmour, University of Ottawa	The diversity of carbonic anhydrases: Insight into the regulation of the internal environment in fishes.
2022	Patricia Schulte, University of British Columbia	In the footsteps of Fry: responses to environmental stressors in fish.
2021	Helga Guderley, Université Laval	Muscle metabolic plasticity: environment and evolution.
2020	Anthony P. Russell, University of Calgary	The sticky fingers of geckos: from esoteric backwater to mainstream interdisciplinary science.
2019	Robert Shadwick, University of British Columbia	Adventures in zoology with rorqual whales.
2018	Jean-Guy J. Godin, Carleton University	Sexual selection and male mate choice: insights from a small tropical fish
2017	Céline Audet, Université du Québec à Rimouski	Ecophysiology, a unique and exciting—but challenging—way to study adaptations of fishes to their environment.
2016	Brock Fenton, University of Western Ontario	The endless allure of bats.
2015	Patricia Wright, University of Guelph	Living on the edge – The physiology of amphibious fish in and out of water.
2014	Glen Van Der Kraak, University of Guelph	The sex lives of fish: Science, policy and beyond.
2013	Miodrag Belosevic, University of Alberta	Life is PIE.
2012	Steve Perry, University of Ottawa	Reelin’ in the Years: A Retrospective Look at Fish Ionic Regulation.
2011	Kenneth Storey, Carleton University	Exploring biochemical adaptations: synthetic intuition on a family farm.
2010	Joseph S. Nelson, University of Alberta	From Kokanee to Suckers to Sticklebacks to classifying the world of fishes.
2009	Anthony Farrell, University of British Columbia	
2008	Jeremy N. McNeil, University of Western Ontario	
2007	Nancy M. Sherwood, University of Victoria	The evolution of brain hormones that control reproduction: Genomics to the rescue.
2006	Richard E. Peter, University of Alberta	Neuroendocrine control systems in the goldfish.
2005	John Youson, University of Toronto, Scarborough	A life of research with fishes of ancient lineage.
2004	Thomas W. Moon, University of Ottawa	Fish metabolism: the good, the bad and the ugly.
2003	William K. Milsom, University of British Columbia	Adaptive trends in respiratory control: A comparative perspective.
2002	Robert G. Boutilier, Cambridge University	Mechanisms of cell survival in hypoxia and hypothermia.
2001	Frederick William Henry Beamish, Burapha University	Axioms and anecdotes of a zoologist.
2000	John Philips, University of British Columbia	Pumps, Peptides and Pests.
1999	Chris M. Wood, McMaster University	Physiology of The Lake Magadi Tilapia, a fish adapted to one of the most extreme aquatic environments on Earth.
1998	Geoffrey J. Eales, University of Manitoba	Thyroxine – hormone or vitamin?
1997	Harold Atwood, Toronto	Adaptation in the nervous system.
1996	Charles Krebs, University of British Columbia	Vertebrate community dynamics in the Yukon boreal forest.
1995	Peter Hochachka, University of British Columbia	Regulated metabolic suppression in surviving oxygen lack: a conceptual mirror to Fry’s “scope for activity”.
1994	Brian K. Hall, Dalhousie University	Development and evolution of the vertebrate skeleton.
1993	David Randall, University of British Columbia	Fish gas transfer: conflicts and compromise in design.
1992	Dave R. Jones, University of British Columbia	Cardiovascular dynamics of the alligator.
1991	Roger Downer, University of Waterloo	Exciting insects and other biological diversions.
1990	William C. Leggett, McGill University	Understanding variations in fish distribution and abundance; is the answer blowing in the wind?
1989	George Owen Mackie, University of Victoria	Aggregates or integrates? Aspects of communication in animal communities.
1988	Dennis Chitty, University of British Columbia	Beautiful hypotheses and ugly facts.
1987	Kenneth G. Davey, York University	Blood, guts, sex and affairs of the heart in insects.
1986	D. R. Idler, Memorial University of Newfoundland	Fish hormones: my personal experiences.
1985	J. R. Brett, Pacific Biological Station	Production energetics of a population of sockeye salmon, Onchorhynchus nerka.
1984	no award	
1983	William Edward Ricker, Pacific Biological Station	How to draw a straight line.
1982	F. J. Rigler, University of Toronto	No lecture because of illness
1981	Keith Ronald, University of Guelph	Life and death of a seal.
1980	D. M. Ross. University of Alberta	Illusion and reality in comparative physiology.
1979	Maxwell J. Dunbar, McGill University	The blunting of Occam’s razor, or to hell with parsimony.
1978	Peter Anthony Larkin, University of British Columbia	Maybe you can’t get there from here: A foreshortened history of research in relation to management of Pacific salmon.
1977	Helen I. Battle, University of Western Ontario	A saga of zoology in Canada.
1976	Ian McTaggart-Cowan, University of British Columbia	The sociology of carnivores related to their use of resources.
1975	F. R. Hayes, Dalhousie University	Quantitative and aesthetic factors in the definition of an ideal environment.
1974	William S. Hoar, University of British Columbia	Smolt transformation: evolution, behavior and physiology.

== See also ==
- List of biologists
- List of biology awards
- List of awards named after people
