= James Halliday McDunnough =

Canadian entomologist (1877–1962)

- Born: May 10, 1877; Toronto, Ontario, Canada
- Died: February 23, 1962 (aged 84); Halifax, Nova Scotia, Canada
- Education: Kaiser Wilhelm Institute for Biology
- Scientific career
- Fields: Entomology
- Author abbrev. (zoology): Barnes & McDunnough, McDunnough

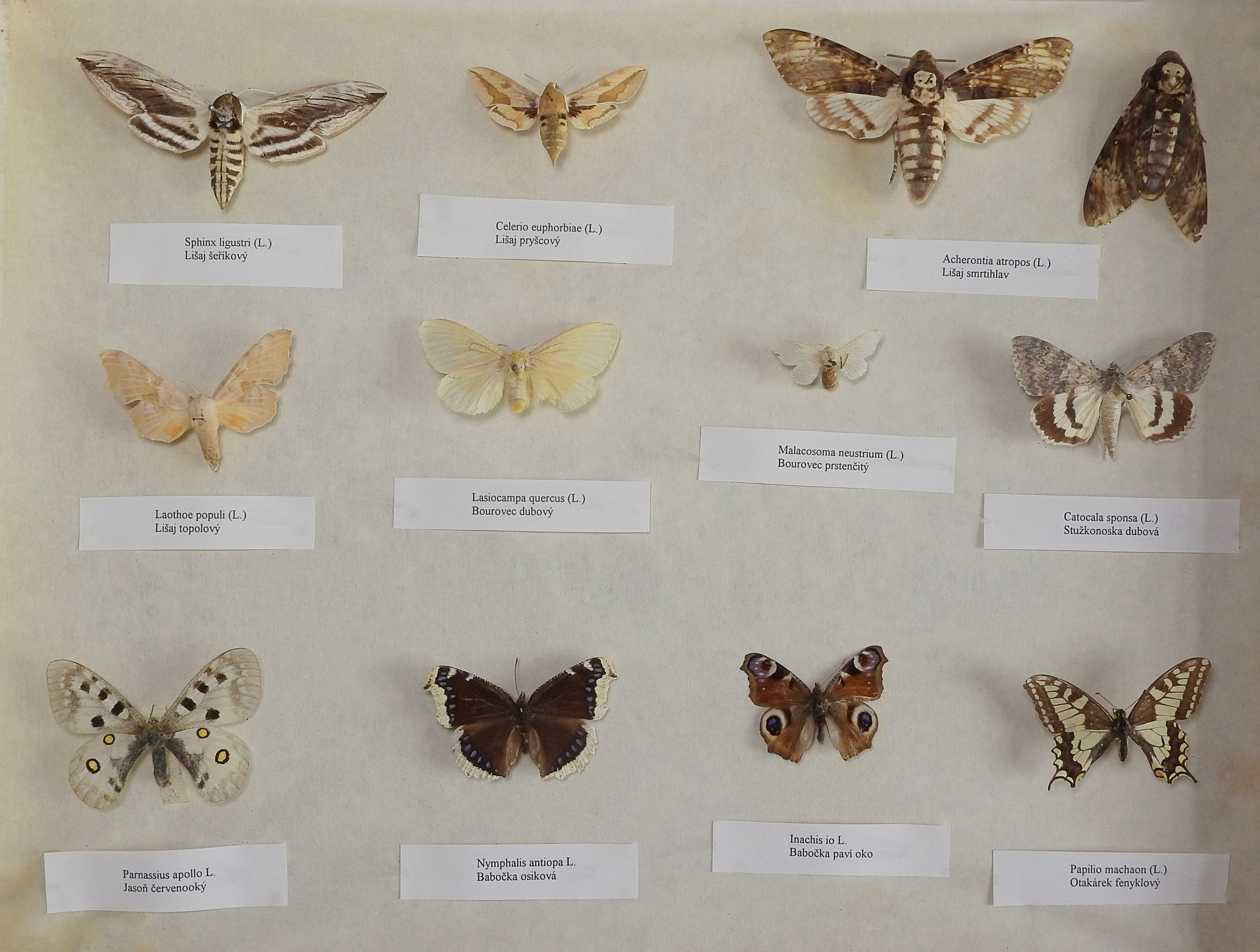
Lepidoptera collection

James Halliday McDunnough (10 May 1877 – 23 February 1962) was a Canadian linguist, musician, and entomologist best known for his work with North American Lepidoptera, but who also made important contributions about North American Ephemeroptera.

== Early life ==
McDunnough travelled with his mother and aunt to Berlin to be trained as a classical musician, studying under the great violinist Joseph Joachim. After a season as a violinist in a symphony orchestra in Glasgow, Scotland (presumably what is now the Royal Scottish National Orchestra), he taught English to a Russian family and then decided to change careers. In 1904 he went back to study in Berlin, receiving his doctorate in zoology in 1909.

Returning to North America, he worked briefly at the Marine Biological Laboratory in Woods Hole, Massachusetts and married Margaret Bertels, from Berlin. He soon learned of an important opportunity: a wealthy surgeon in Decatur, Illinois named William Barnes needed an entomologist to serve as curator and researcher for his private collection of North American Lepidoptera - probably the best in existence at the time.

From 1910 to 1919 McDunnough produced, with Barnes credited as co-author, an impressive volume of research on the taxonomy of North American Lepidoptera, including the first four volumes of the privately published Contributions to the Natural History of the Lepidoptera of North America, the 1917 Check list of the Lepidoptera of Boreal America, Illustrations of the North American Species of the Genus Catocala, and numerous journal articles, 67 papers in all. He also published nine articles solely under his own name during this period.

In 1918, McDunnough spent a summer helping with the Canada National Collection of Insects (now the Canadian National Collection of Insects, Arachnids and Nematodes) by arranging the microlepidoptera part of the collection. This led to his leaving the job with Barnes in 1919 and heading the newly created Division of Systematic Entomology within the Entomological Branch of the Canadian Department of Agriculture. He remained there until 1946.

During those 28 years, he oversaw the development of the Canadian National Collection into a world-class repository of insect and other arthropod specimens along with an extensive library of entomological publications, conducted faunal surveys throughout Canada, and published 199 taxonomic papers.

Over the same period, he also was editor for the Entomological Society of Canada's journal, The Canadian Entomologist, from 1921 to 1938. After retirement, he was appointed a research associate at the American Museum of Natural History, working there from late 1946 to 1950.

In 1950, after the death of his wife, he moved to Halifax, Nova Scotia, where he became a research associate for the Nova Scotia Museum of Science, while still publishing papers through the AMNH. The following year, he became the first president of the Lepidopterists' Society. His last paper was published in the year of his death, 1962, at the age of 84.
