= Edgar Harold Strickland =

Canadian entomologist (1889–1962)

- Born: 29 May 1889; Erith
- Died: 31 May 1962 (aged 73); Victoria, British Columbia
- Scientific career
- Fields: Entomology

Edgar Harold Strickland (29 May 1889 in Erith – 31 May 1962 in Victoria, British Columbia) was an English army colonel and entomologist who specialized in flies and was the founding entomologist at the University of Alberta.

== Biography ==
Strickland was born at Erith, Kent. He studied at Wye College with Frederick Vincent Theobald then at Harvard University with a Carnegie studentship. He studied under W. M. Wheeler, working on termites and parasites of Simulium. From 1913 to 1921, he was entomology officer for the province of Alberta based in Lethbridge. He served as a lieutenant in the First World War with the 1st Battalion of the Canadian Machine Gun Corps and was wounded in France in 1918. In 1922, he founded the University of Alberta's entomology department and served as a one-man department until 1946. During the Second World War, he served as a commanding officer of the Army Basic Training Unit at Wetaskiwin and attained the rank of colonel. In 1946, he was joined by Brian Hocking at the entomology department and he retired in 1954.

Strickland wrote 60 entomological papers on ecology, life cycles, taxonomy, and pest control. He is best-known for his prescient 1945 paper, "Could the widespread use of DDT be a disaster?" He was married to Alice Fairfield from 1924 and they had two daughters.

== E.H. Strickland Entomological Museum ==
The entomological collection at the University of Alberta is named in honour of Strickland. This museum currently hosts over a million specimens and is curated by Felix Sperling. This museum holds the largest collection of Mexican ground beetles in the world. It is also an important collection regionally, with specimens encompassing most species of insects in the province of Alberta.
