= Henry Croft (disambiguation) =

Henry Croft (1856–1917) was a Canadian mining magnate.

Henry Croft may also refer to:

- Henry Croft (pearly) (1861–1930), founder of the working class tradition of Pearly Kings and Queens
- Henry Page Croft, 1st Baron Croft (1881–1947), British soldier and politician
- Henry Holmes Croft (1820–1883), British scientist and educator
- Harry Croft (1875–1933), baseball player
- Henry Croft (field hockey) (born 2001), British field hockey player

== See also ==
- Henry Crofts (1590–1667), English politician
