= Kenneth G. Davey =

Canadian biologist and entomologist (1932–2025)

Kenneth G. Davey OC FRSC
- Born: April 20, 1932; Chatham, Ontario, Canada
- Died: November 12, 2025 (aged 93); Ottawa, Ontario, Canada
- Education: University of Western Ontario (BSc, MSc); University of Cambridge (PhD)
- Known for: Research on insect hormones and physiology
- Awards: Fry Medal (1987); Officer of the Order of Canada (OC); Gold Medal, Entomological Society of Canada; Gold Medal, Biological Council of Canada; Wigglesworth Award, Royal Entomological Society
- Scientific career
- Fields: Entomology, Insect physiology, Endocrinology
- Workplaces: McGill University; York University
- Thesis: (1963)
- Doctoral advisor: Vincent Wigglesworth

Kenneth George Davey OC FRSC (April 20, 1932 – November 12, 2025) was a Canadian biologist and entomologist who specialized in insect physiology and endocrinology. He was a Distinguished Research Professor Emeritus at York University and was recognized internationally for his research on insect hormones and development.

Davey was a Fellow of the Royal Society of Canada (FRSC) and an Officer of the Order of Canada (OC). He published more than 200 peer-reviewed papers and served as an editor of the Canadian Journal of Zoology for three decades.

== Early life and education ==
Kenneth George Davey was born on April 20, 1932, in Chatham, Ontario. He received both a BSc and a MSc in zoology from the University of Western Ontario. He then pursued doctoral studies at the University of Cambridge, where he earned a PhD in insect physiology in 1963. His doctoral supervisor was Professor Vincent Wigglesworth, a pioneering figure in insect physiology. During his time at Cambridge, Davey was a Fellow of Gonville and Caius College from 1959 to 1963.

== Career ==
=== McGill University ===
After completing his doctorate, Davey joined McGill University as a faculty member in 1963. He served as Associate Professor of Parasitology from 1963 to 1966, then as Professor of Parasitology and Biology from 1966 to 1974. He was appointed Director of McGill's Institute of Parasitology in 1964, a position he held until 1974. This period established his national reputation as a researcher in insect physiology and as an academic administrator.

=== York University ===
In 1974, Davey moved to York University in Toronto, where he remained for the rest of his academic career. He held several senior administrative positions at York, including Chair of the Department of Biology from 1974 to 1981, Dean of the Faculty of Science from 1982 to 1985, and Vice-President of Academic Affairs from 1986 to 1991.

Davey retired from full-time teaching in 2000 but continued contributing to the university. In 2002, he became a Fellow of York's Institute of Social Research. He closed his research laboratory in 2002 but remained active as a peer reviewer and advocate for ethics in scientific publishing.

== Research ==
Davey's research focused on the hormonal control of development and physiology in invertebrates, particularly insects and nematodes. His work helped unravel how hormones shape insect growth and egg development. He is credited with discovering a new insect hormone and explaining how similar hormonal systems function in parasitic worms. Much of his research centered on the insect Rhodnius prolixus and the role of juvenile hormone in ovarian development.

Davey published more than 200 peer-reviewed scientific papers during his career. He served as an editor of the Canadian Journal of Zoology for 30 years, making significant contributions to the journal and the broader scientific community. He also served on review panels, committees, and editorial boards for national and international scientific organizations.

Later in his career, Davey became an outspoken advocate for maintaining high standards in scientific peer review and spoke out against predatory academic publishers.

== Honours and awards ==
Davey received numerous honors and awards from scientific organizations in Canada and internationally:

- Fellow of the Royal Society of Canada (FRSC)
- Honorary Fellow of the Royal Entomological Society
- Officer of the Order of Canada (OC)
- Gold Medal of the Entomological Society of Canada (1981)
- Fry Medal of the Canadian Society of Zoologists (1987)
- Gold Medal of the Biological Council of Canada (1987)
- Wigglesworth Award for Outstanding Services to the Science of Entomology from the Royal Entomological Society
- Queen Elizabeth II Silver Jubilee Medal (1977)
- Queen Elizabeth II Golden Jubilee Medal (2002)
- Queen Elizabeth II Diamond Jubilee Medal (2012)

Davey received honorary doctorates from the University of Western Ontario, York University, and Dalhousie University.

== Personal life and death ==
Outside of his scientific work, Davey enjoyed gardening, cooking, and weaving. He was known for his quick wit and storytelling abilities.

Davey was predeceased by his daughter Megan and his brother Clark. He is survived by his son Chris, daughter Katherine, and grandchildren Annie and Kimberly.

Kenneth Davey died on November 12, 2025, in Ottawa, Ontario, at the age of 93.
