= Judith H. Myers =

Canadian-American ecologist

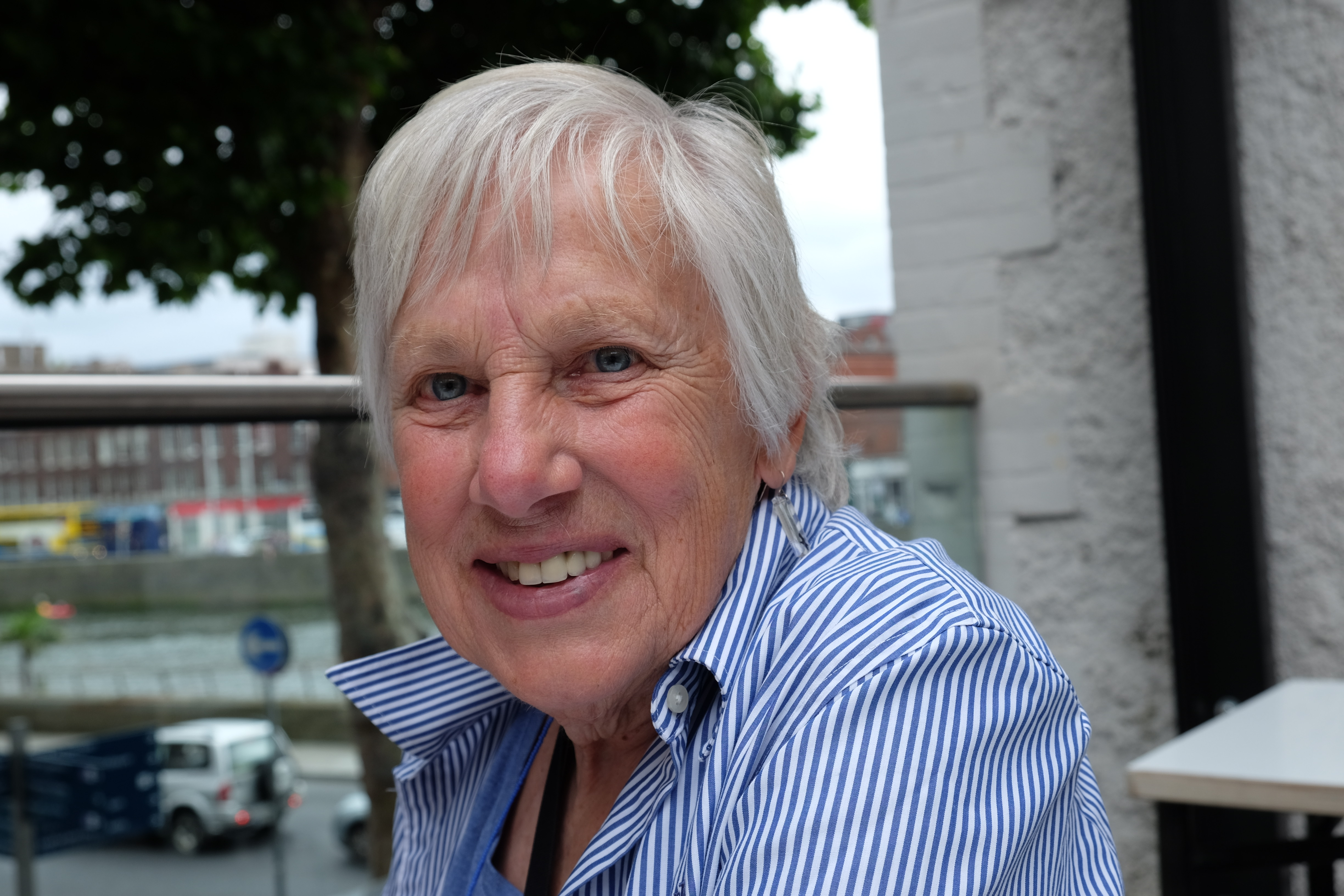
- Born: Pennsylvania, U.S.
- Education: B.Sc. Biology (1959-1963), Chatham University (Chatham College); M.Sc. Biology (1965-1968) Tufts University; Ph.D. Ecology (1967-1970) Indiana University Bloomington; Post-doctorate Ecology (1970-1972) University of California, Berkeley
- Known for: Ecological entomology, biocontrol, population cycles, tent caterpillars
- Spouse: J.N.M. (Jamie) Smith (b. 1944 d. 2005)
- Children: 2
- Scientific career
- Fields: Ecology and entomology the population cycle, biological pest control, introduced species
- Workplaces: University of British Columbia; University of Edinburgh
- Academic advisors: Charles J. Krebs
- Notable students: Jens Roland
- Website: www.zoology.ubc.ca/~myers/myerslab

Judith (Judy) H. Myers is a Canadian-American ecologist. In 2014, she was elected president of the Canadian Society for Ecology and Evolution, and served in that role until 2016. Professor Myers is well known for her decades-long research into plant-animal-microbe interactions, including insect pest outbreaks, viral pathogens of insects, and pioneering work on biological control of insects and plants, particularly invasive species. Throughout her career she has advocated strongly for both the public understanding of science and for increasing the number of women in the STEM subjects: Science, Technology, Engineering, and Mathematics.

Myers was a trustee of the Entomological Society of Canada. In 2004, she was awarded its gold medal for her contributions to the theory and practice of biological control. She also won the McCarthy Award from the Professional Pest Management Association of British Columbia. As a published author, she is widely held in libraries worldwide.

== Research ==
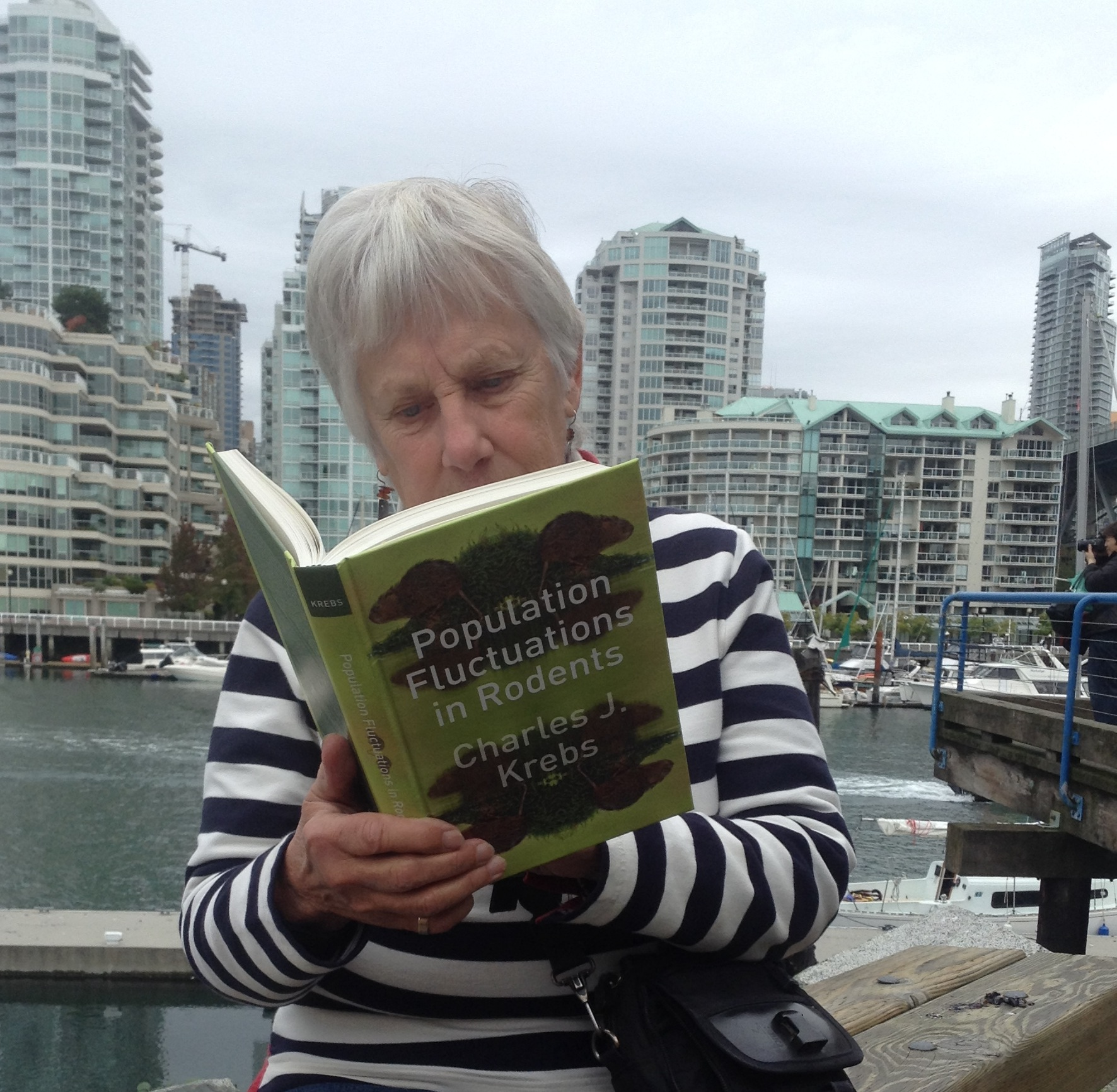
Myers reading one of Charles Krebs books in downtown Vancouver in 2013

Myers is known for her work on population cycles spanning more than four decades. She has made important contributions to understanding cycling dynamics through theory, reviews, and data via her long-term monitoring of western tent caterpillars.

Early in her career Myers became one of the pioneers for studying biocontrol. Her research takes an interdisciplinary, collaborative, inclusive approach to the management of environmental pest problems. She emphasizes the importance of long-term ecological data with which to challenge and inform ecological models.

Myers is currently (since 2006) Professor Emerita in the Department of Zoology at the University of British Columbia (UBC). She joined the faculty in 1972 after being a Miller Research Fellow at the University of California, Berkeley (1970-1972). She was cross-appointed to the Faculty of Agricultural Sciences (now Faculty of Land and Food Systems). Myers worked with fellow ecologists Charles Krebs, Tony (Anthony) R.E. Sinclair and her late husband, Jamie (James N.M.) Smith, initially in the Institute of Animal Resource Ecology and later in the Biodiversity Centre at UBC.

== Biography ==
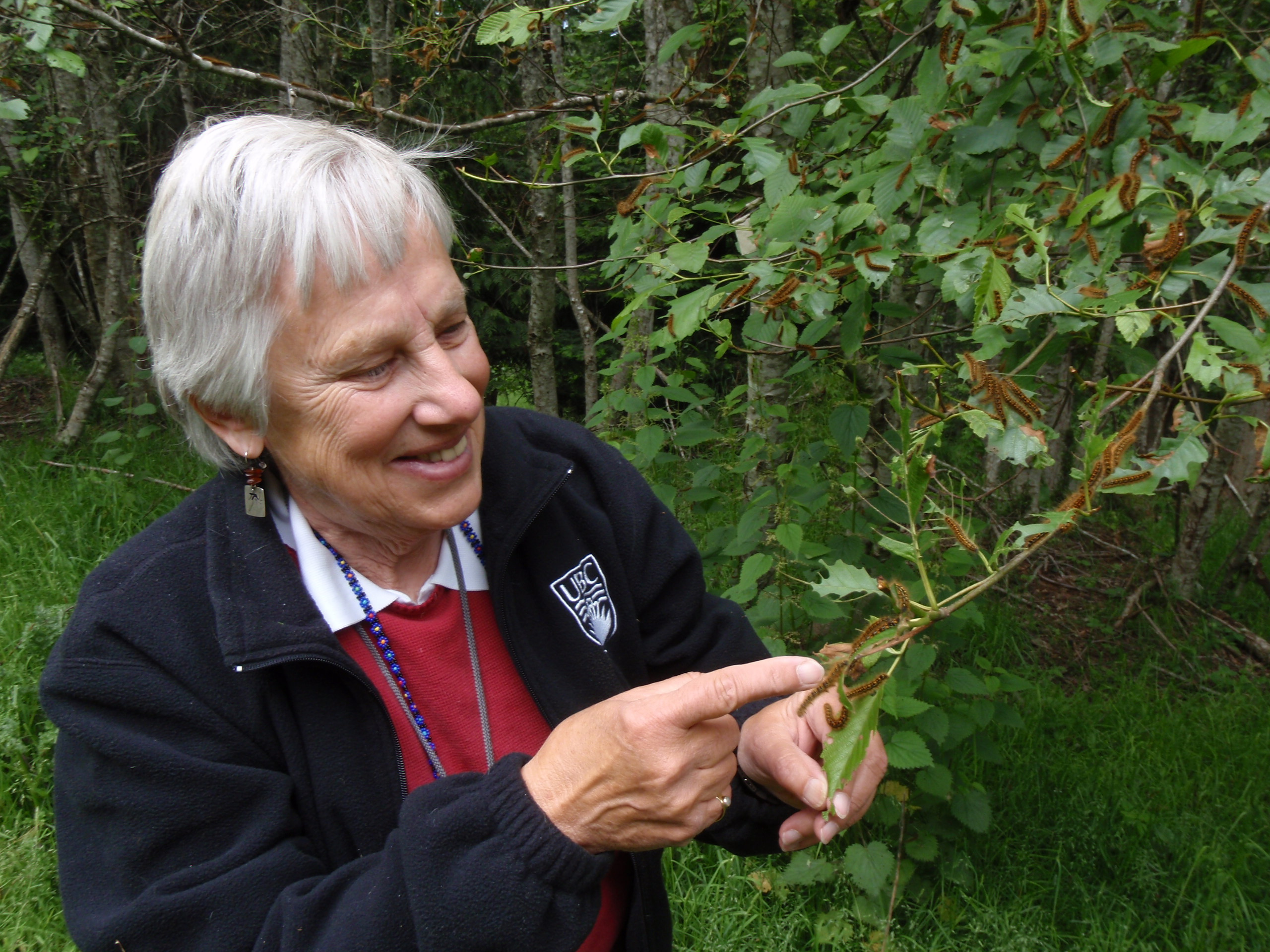
Myers with some the organisms (western tent caterpillars) whose population biology she has studied for decades

In addition to research, Myers made lasting contributions to teaching at UBC, notably developing the long-running 'Conservation Biology' course.

Myers has served on various NSERC (Natural Sciences and Engineering Research Council of Canada) committees, particularly those related to women in science including the Women's Faculty Award Committee and the Women in Science and Engineering Chair Program. She was a member of the NSERC Biological Control Network and was Theme leader – Greenhouses (2001-2006) and co-theme leader – New, improved microbial agents for management of insect pests (2001-2006).

She is the mother of Iain and Isla Myers-Smith, who were born in Vancouver, British Columbia and Canberra, Australia respectively. Isla Myers-Smith is a professor at the University of British Columbia and honorary fellow at the University of Edinburgh.

== Advocacy for women in STEM ==
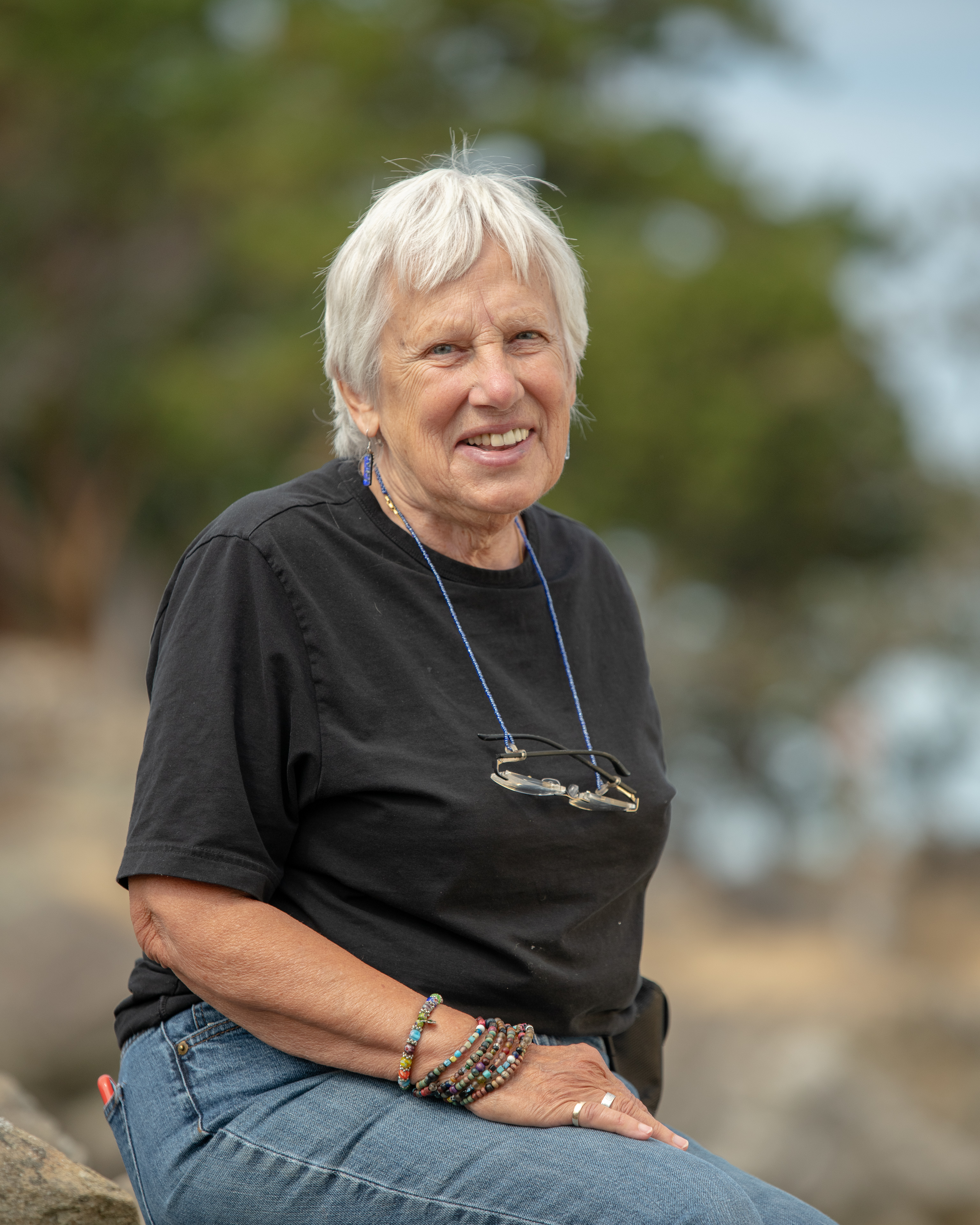
Myers in 2019 on Saturna Island, BC, where she stays while continuing to write research articles

Myers was at the forefront of Canadian post-secondary education's efforts to recruit more women in STEM fields during the late 1980s and early 1990s, when she was Associate Dean of Science at the University of British Columbia. At that time simply discussing data related to the leaky pipeline could be contentious. Myers is quoted on p. 298 of Martin Loney's 1998 book critiquing what he described as identity politics in Canadian post-secondary education, The Pursuit of Division: Race, Gender, and Preferential Hiring in Canada. Loney challenged Myers to produce data to support her assertion that policies impeding women being hired were operating during the 1960s. Research into the complex nature of barriers to women being hired in the post-secondary education STEM sector has since expanded significantly. Judy Myers continues to be a strong advocate for women in STEM.

Myers describes some of her own experiences as a woman in STEM (including being the first person to take maternity leave in the UBC Faculty of Science) in a special issue of the journal Evolutionary Applications.

In addition to her 2014-2016 presidency of the Canadian Society for Ecology and Evolution (CSEE), Myers is past President of the Canadian Coalition for Women in Science, Engineering, Trades and Technology (CCWESTT) and of the Society for Canadian Women in Science and Technology.

== Honours ==
- Lifetime Achievement McCarthy Award and Elected Honorary Member, Professional Pest Management Association of B.C. (2009)
- Gold Medal, Entomological Society Canada (2004)
- Elected Honorary Member of the Entomological Society of Canada (2015)
- Cornerstone Award for Contributions to Women in STEM, Chatham University, Pittsburgh PA (2018)

== Major publications ==
- Judy Myers and coauthor Dawn R. Bazely's 2003 monograph, "Ecology and Control of Introduced Plants" (Cambridge University Press) was selected as an American Library Association CHOICE Outstanding Academic Title in 2005.
- Myers, J.H. and Sarfraz, R.M. 2017. Impacts of insect herbivores on plant populations. Annual Review of Entomology 62, pages 207–230.
- Myers, J.H. and Cory, J.S. 2013. Population cycles in forest Lepidoptera revisited. Annual Review of Ecology, Evolution and Systematics 44: pages 565-592
- Cory, J.S. and J.H. Myers. 2003. The ecology and evolution of insect Baculoviruses. Annual Review of Ecology, Evolution and Systematics 34: pages 239–272.
- Myers, J.H. et al. 2000. Eradication revisited: dealing with exotic species. Annual Review of Ecology, Evolution and Systematics 20: pages 331–348. This is one of Prof Myers best known publications, having been cited more than 700 times
- Myers J.H. 1988 Can a general hypothesis explain population-cycles of forest Lepidoptera. Advances in Ecological Research 18: pages 179-242
- Krebs, C.J. and J.H. Myers. 1974. Population cycles in small mammals. Advances in Ecological Research. Academic Press. pages 267–399.
