= Dawn R. Bazely =

Biology professor (born 1960)

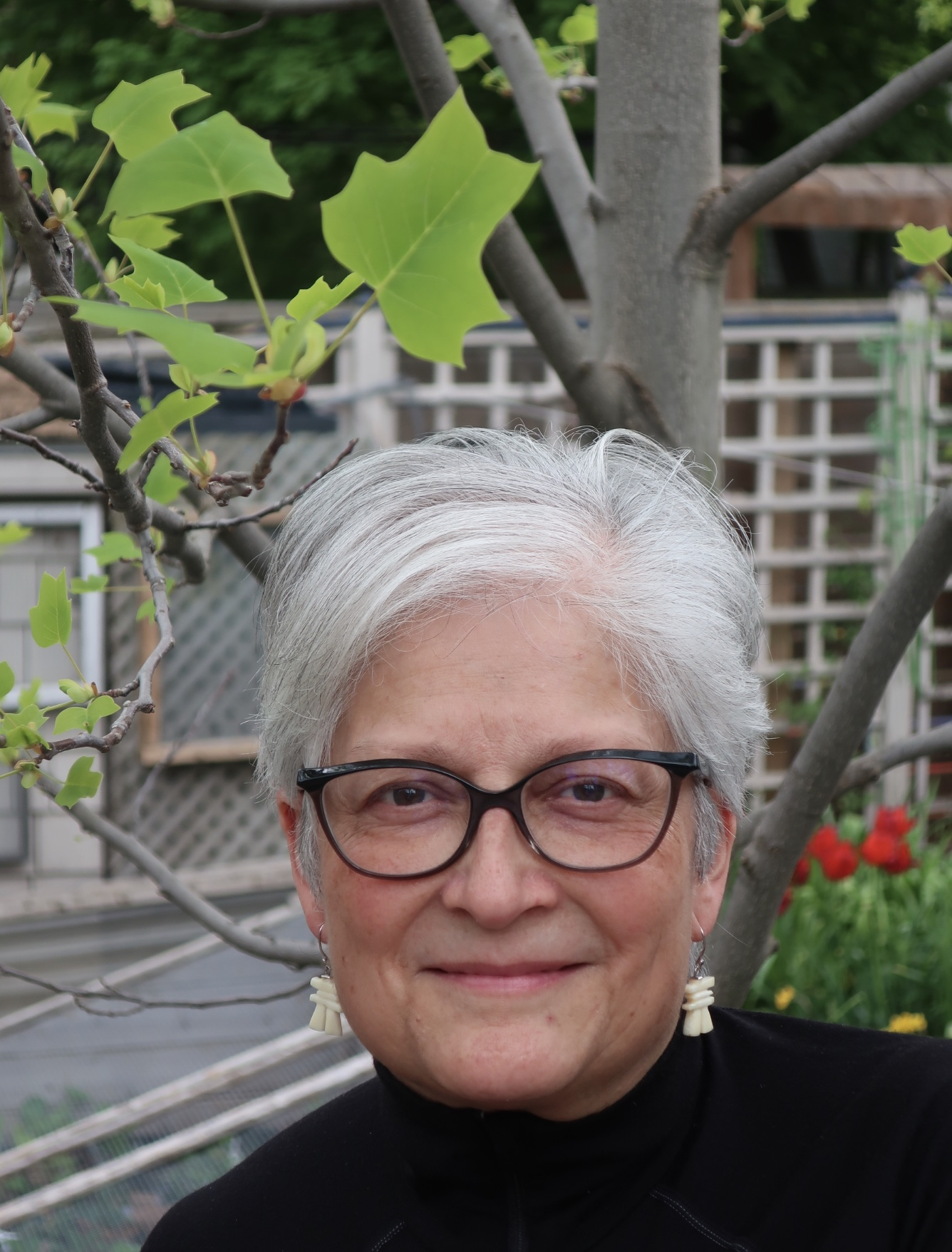
- Born: 30 August 1960 (age 66); India
- Education: University of Toronto; Somerville College, Oxford
- Scientific career
- Fields: Ecology
- Workplaces: York University
- Thesis: Foraging behaviour of sheep (Ovis aries L.) grazing on swards of perennial ryegrass (Lolium perenne L.)
- Doctoral advisor: John R. Krebs
- Website: http://dawnbazely.lab.yorku.ca/

Dawn R. Bazely (born 30 August 1960) is a full professor in biology in the Faculty of Science, and the former Director of the Institute for Research Innovation in Sustainability (2006-2011 and 2012–2014), at York University in Canada. In 2015 she was awarded the title of University Professor for services to research, teaching, and the institution. Bazely has been a field biologist for forty years and her research specializes in plant-animal interactions in ecology. She has also been recognized for her science communication.

== Early life and education ==
Bazely was born in India, and moved as a toddler to England, United Kingdom.

She completed her Bachelor of Science degree in biogeography and environmental studies at the University of Toronto. She then completed a Master's (MSc) degree in botany, under the supervision of Robert L. Jefferies, at the University of Toronto. Her MSc thesis investigated the impact of grazing by Anser caerulescens caerulescens (lesser snow geese) on the Hudson Bay shores' salt-marsh vegetation. She then completed her D.Phil. (PhD) in zoology, at the Edward Grey Institute in Field Ornithology, at the University of Oxford in 1998. supervised by John R. Krebs; she investigated sheep grazing behaviour.

== Career ==
Bazely then held an Ernest Cook Research Fellowship at Somerville College of the University of Oxford, followed by a Trevelyan Research Fellowship at Selwyn College of the University of Cambridge. In 1990, she returned to Canada to join York University's biology department as a faculty member.

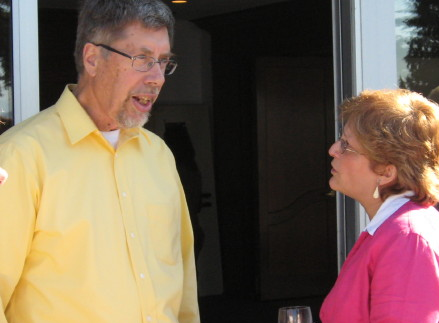
Bazely (right) speaking to Charles Krebs at the retirement of colleague Judith H. Myers in 2007

She was York University's Director of the Institute for Research and Innovation in Sustainability (IRIS) from 2006 to 2011 and 2012–14. In this role, she developed expertise in sustainability, science policy and environmental security, and expanded her research focus. Currently, Bazely is a University Professor within York University's faculty of Ecology and Evolutionary Biology.

=== Research ===
Bazely's research lab focuses on ecology (specifically forests, grasslands, herbivores, climate change and invasive species), and broader issues of sustainability, as well as exploring intersections with science policy, open access, citizen science, and science communication. She has published over 70 academic publications, as well as books and book chapters, resulting in over 2,000 citations and an h-index of 26.

=== Teaching ===
In 2003, Bazely received York University's Faculty of Science and Engineering Excellence in Teaching Award. In 2013, she was awarded York University's President's University-Wide Teaching Awards, in the senior full-time faculty category, in recognition of time spent on preparing and innovating the courses she teaches. Bazely was also recognized as a "Hotshot Professor" in the Globe and Mail's 2014 Canadian University Report. In a The Washington Post editorial, Bazely writes that she uses editing Wikipedia pages as a tool to teach her students the skills of HTML-style coding. Bazely also co-sponsors a Wikipedia Edit-a-thon at York University.

=== Public engagement and science communication ===
In 2015, Bazely co-founded York University's Annual International Ada Lovelace Day with York University's Science and Engineering Librarian, John Dupuis. In July 2018, she was an invited speaker for a science communication panel at the 2018 Canadian Society for Ecology and Evolution Annual Meeting, where she spoke about communicating science to policy makers.

=== Awards ===
- 2017 York University's Sustainability Leadership Award.
- 2022 Sandford Fleming Medal for Excellence in Science Communication.
- 2022 Minister of Colleges and Universities’ Awards of Excellence.

== Bibliography ==
=== Selected academic publications ===
- Bazely DR, and Jefferies RL. "Goose faeces: a source of nitrogen for plant growth in a grazed salt marsh". The Journal of Ecology, 693–703. 1985.
- Bazely DR and Jefferies RL. "Changes in the composition and standing crop of salt-marsh communities in response to the removal of a grazer." The Journal of Ecology, 693–706. 1986.
- Vicari M and Bazely DR. "Do grasses fight back? The case for antiherbivore defences." Trends in Ecology & Evolution. 8(4), 137–141. 1993.
- McLachlan SM and Bazely DR. "Recovery patterns of understory herbs and their use as indicators of deciduous forest regeneration." Conservation Biology 15 (1), 98–110. 2001.
- Koh S, Vicari M, Ball JP, Rakocevic T, Zaheer S, Hik DS and Bazely DR. "Rapid detection of fungal endophytes in grasses for large‐scale studies." Functional Ecology 20 (4), 736–742. 2006.
- Tanentzap AJ, Bazely DR and Lafortezza R. "Diversity–invasibility relationships across multiple scales in disturbed forest understoreys." Biological Invasions 12 (7), 2105–2116. 2010.
- Bazel DR, Perkins PE, Duailibi M and Klenk, N. "Strengthening Resilience by Thinking of Knowledge as a Nutrient Connecting the Local Person to Global Thinking." Planetary Praxis & Pedagogy, 119–132. 2015.
- Bazely DR, Dubreuil A and Nanayakkara L. "How the unconference approach can increase stakeholder engagement." Revista Vínculos 3 (1). 2018.

=== Selected books ===
- Myers J, Myers JH, and Bazely DR. "Ecology and control of introduced plants." Cambridge University Press. 2003.
- Hoogensen Gjørv G, Bazely DR, Goloviznina M, and Tanentzap AJ. "Environmental and Human Security in the Arctic." Routledge (Earthscan): Taylor & Francis Group. 2014.
