= Schneiderian membrane =

Lining of the maxillary sinus cavity

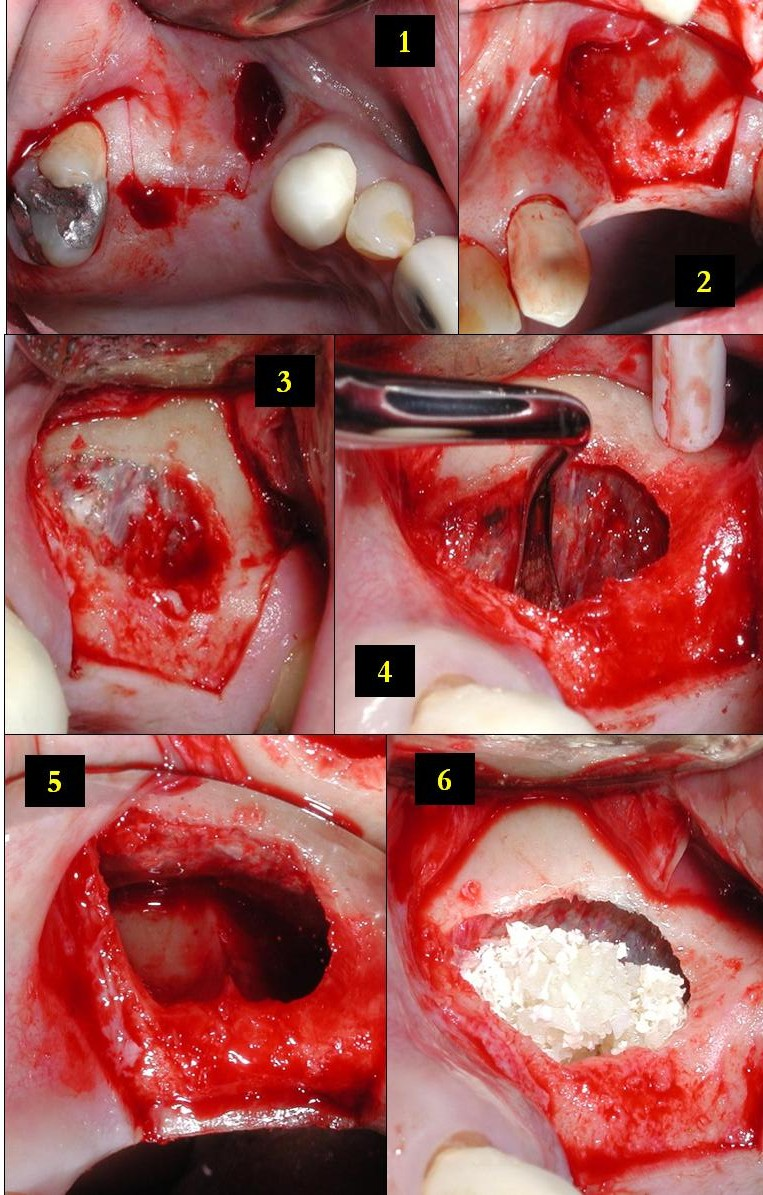
1) Edentulous area of two missing teeth is being prepared for future placement of dental implants with a lateral window sinus lift; incisions into the soft tissue are shown here. 2) The soft tissue is flapped back to expose the underlying lateral wall of the left maxillary sinus. 3) The bone has been removed with a piezoelectric instrument, exposing the underlying Schneiderian membrane, which is the lining of the maxillary sinus cavity. 4) Through careful instrumentation, the membrane is carefully peeled from the inner aspect of the sinus cavity. 5) The membrane has been reflected from the internal aspect of the inferior portion of the sinus cavity; one can now visualize the bony floor of the sinus cavity without its lining membrane (note the triangular ridge of bone within the sinus, known as an Underwood's septum). 6) The newly formed space within the bony cavity of the sinus yet inferior to the intact membrane is grafted with human cadaver allograft bone. The floor of the sinus will now be roughly 10mm or so more superior than it was before, providing enough room to place dental implants into the edentulous site.

In anatomy, the Schneiderian membrane is the membranous lining of the maxillary sinus cavity. Microscopically there is a bilaminar membrane with pseudostratified ciliated columnar epithelial cells on the internal (or cavernous) side and periosteum on the osseous side. The size of the sinuses varies in different skulls, and even on the two sides of the same skull. This membrane is present in the nasal chamber which helps to smell (olfactory receptor)
