= Robert Boutilier =

Canadian biologist (1953–2003)

- Born: 8 September 1953; Halifax, Canada
- Died: 21 December 2003 (aged 50); Cambridge, UK
- Education: Acadia University; University of East Anglia
- Awards: FRSC (2000)
- Scientific career
- Workplaces: Dalhousie University; University of Cambridge
- Thesis: Gas exchange and transport during intermittent ventillation in the aquatic amphibian, Xenopus laevis (1981)

Robert Graeme Boutilier FRSC (8 September 1953 – 21 December 2003) was a Canadian biologist.

He graduated from Acadia University with a first class BSc in 1976 and an MSc in 1978, and completed his PhD at the University of East Anglia in 1981. He was an associate professor at Dalhousie University, and a lecturer in zoology at the University of Cambridge. He was made a fellow of the Royal Society of Canada in 2000, and was awarded the Fry Medal of the Canadian Society of Zoologists in 2002. He was editor of The Journal of Experimental Biology.
