= The Living Sea (TV program) =

- Genre: Nature
- Presented by: Ian McTaggart-Cowan
- Country of origin: Canada
- Original language: English
- No. of seasons: 1

Production
- Producer: Ken Bray
- Production location: Vancouver
- Running time: 30 minutes

Original release
- Network: CBC Television
- Release: 7 July 1957 – 30 March 1958

The Living Sea is a Canadian nature television program that aired on CBC Television from 1957 to 1962.

== Premise ==
University of British Columbia zoology professor Ian McTaggart-Cowan hosted this program on marine life, both plants and animals.

== Scheduling ==
This half-hour program was initially broadcast for one season on Sunday afternoons from 7 July to 13 October 1957, then resumed 5 January to 30 March 1958. Episodes were rebroadcast on Wednesdays at 5:30 p.m. from 4 July to 19 September 1962 under the supervision of Tom Connachie.
