= Fur & Feather =

Canadian children's television series

- Presented by: Ian McTaggart-Cowan
- Country of origin: Canada
- Original language: English
- No. of seasons: 1

Production
- Producer: Bill Inglis
- Production location: Vancouver
- Running time: 15 minutes

Original release
- Network: CBC Television
- Release: 6 July 1955 – 25 June 1956

Fur & Feather is a Canadian children's television series about animals which aired on CBC Television from 1955 to 1956. It was hosted by Ian McTaggart-Cowan who headed the Zoology Department at the University of British Columbia.

== Scheduling ==
The Vancouver-produced series aired on Wednesdays at 5:00 p.m. from 6 July 1955 to 21 September 1955, then aired Mondays at 4:30 p.m. from 26 September 1955 until 25 June 1956.

The debut episode featured penguins. McTaggart-Cowan was joined by David Maxwell on some episodes.

== Selected episodes ==
No.	Title	Summary
1	"All About Penguins"	Debut episode - concerns penguins, their behaviour and environment
3	"Meet the Moose"	Describes the moose
4	"Animal Babies"	Selected animals are shown in their infancy
7	"Fangs & Tusks"	Describes the teeth of some animals and how these are used for survival
12	"All About Antlers"	The growth and use of antlers on some animals
14	"Animal Gliders"	Flying squirrels and other gliding animals are described
18	"Southward Bound"	Describes the various migratory routes of birds, with examples from Arctic terns, shearwaters and yellowlegs and wheatears.
23	"Haymakers of the Mountains"	Describes some animals which make hay such as pikas (rock rabbits) and pack rats
28	"Trumpeters of the North"	Trumpeter swans
30	"Reindeer's Relations"	Various types of Canadian deer are described
48	"The Sea Cliffs"	Demonstrates birds whose habitats are sea cliffs
49	"Shark!"	Various types of sharks are shown
