= Web of Life =

- Genre: Nature documentary
- Presented by: Ian McTaggart-Cowan
- Country of origin: Canada
- Original language: English
- No. of seasons: 3

Production
- Producer: Tom Connachie
- Production locations: Vancouver, British Columbia
- Editor: John Fuller
- Camera setup: Robert Reid

Original release
- Network: CBC Television
- Release: 10 October 1959 – 28 September 1963

Web of Life is a Canadian nature documentary television program that aired on CBC Television from 1959 to 1963.

== Premise ==
This nature program was hosted by University of British Columbia zoology professor Ian McTaggart-Cowan and produced at CBC Vancouver. Episodes used film recorded in the Arctic, the Caribbean, the Gulf of Mexico, Uganda, the American south and in the program's home province (British Columbia).

Episodes of Web of Life were purchased by Granada Television for British television audiences.

== Scheduling ==
This half-hour program was broadcast in four runs from 1959 to 1963, except 1962, as follows (times in North American Eastern zone):

Day	Time	Season run	
Sundays	3:30 p.m.	10 October 1959	3 January 1960
Sundays	3:30 p.m.	3 April 1960	26 Jun 1960
Fridays	5:30 p.m.	14 May 1961	26 August 1961
Fridays	5:30 p.m.	19 April 1963	28 September 1963
