= Dennis Chitty =

Canadian zoologist (1912–2010)

Dennis Hubert Chitty
- Born: September 18, 1912; Bristol, England
- Died: February 3, 2010 (aged 97); Vancouver, British Columbia
- Education: University of Toronto; University of Oxford
- Known for: Chitty Hypothesis of Population Regulation
- Scientific career
- Fields: Vertebrate zoology; Ecology
- Workplaces: University of Oxford; University of British Columbia
- Thesis: Factors controlling the density of wild populations, with special reference to fluctuations in the vole (Microtus) and the snowshoe rabbit (Lepus americanus) (1949)
- Doctoral advisor: Charles Sutherland Elton
- Doctoral students: Charles Krebs

Dennis Hubert Chitty FRSC (18 September 1912 – 3 February 2010), was a professor of zoology at the University of British Columbia. In 1969, he was elected a Fellow of the Royal Society of Canada.

The Chitty Hypothesis of Population Regulation states that population density is limited by spacing behaviour, which has genetic underpinnings and rapidly responds to natural selection. Because of the controversial nature of this idea at the time, David Lack attempted to veto Chitty's dissertation, though it was eventually accepted because of the intervention of Peter Medawar.
