= Felix Sperling =

- Born: Canada
- Education: University of Alberta; Cornell University
- Spouse: Janet Sperling
- Scientific career
- Fields: Entomology
- Workplaces: University of Alberta
- Author abbrev. (zoology): Sperling

Felix Sperling is a Canadian entomologist whose work focuses on the processes of evolution in insects, including the diversification of major insect lineages and the formation of species boundaries. Sperling's work has included a diversity of insect orders including Lepidoptera and Coleoptera.

== Personal life ==
Sperling is married to and has collaborated extensively with fellow entomologist Janet Sperling.

== Career ==
Sperling obtained his MSc from the University of Alberta in 1986 and his PhD from Cornell University in 1991. Sperling is now a professor in the Faculty of Science at the University of Alberta. He was also the president of the Entomological Society of Canada from 2021 to 2022. Additionally, Sperling is the curator of the E.H. Strickland Entomological Museum, an entomological collection with over one million specimens that is located at the University of Alberta. Sperling is also a board member of the G. Magnotta Foundation for Vector-borne disease.

== Awards and recognitions ==
in 2017 Sperling was inducted into the University of Alberta Museums Curator Hall of Fame for his long-standing position as curator of the E. H. Strickland Entomological Museum and his advocacy of collections-based research. In 2012 Sperling was recognized with the Entomological Society of Canada Gold Medal, which recognizes outstanding achievement in Canadian entomology.
