= Jeremy N. McNeil =

British-Canadian biologist and zoologist (1944–2024)

Jeremy N. McNeil CM FRSC
- Born: 20 November 1944; Tonbridge, England
- Died: 18 July 2024 (aged 79)
- Awards: Fry Medal (2008)

Academic background
- Education: BSc, Zoology, 1969, University of Western Ontario; PhD, Entomology and Ecology, 1972, North Carolina State University
- Thesis: Biology and ecology of four hyperparasites of the tobacco hornworm, Manduca sexta (Lepidoptera: Sphingidae). (1972)

Academic work
- Institutions: University of Western Ontario; Laval University

Jeremy Nichol McNeil CM FRSC (20 November 1944 – 18 July 2024) was a British-Canadian biologist and zoologist. In 2004, he was named the Helen Battle Professor of Chemical Ecology in the Biology Department at the University of Western Ontario, having previously worked at Laval University.

== Background ==
McNeil was born in Tonbridge, England on 20 November 1944. His family moved to Newfoundland in 1945, however, he returned to England for high school and worked for two years as a hospital orderly then as a wine merchant in London. He received his bachelor's degree from the University of Western Ontario in 1969 and his PhD at North Carolina State University in 1972. McNeil died on 18 July 2024, at the age of 79.

== Career ==
Upon completing his formal education, McNeil accepted a faculty position at Laval University from 1972 until 2002. In 1998, he received the McNeil Medal from the Royal Society of Canada (RSC) as an "individual who has demonstrated an outstanding ability to promote and communicate science to students and the public within Canada." He also became a Fellow of the Entomological Society of Canada and the Royal Society of Canada (RSC). McNeil left Laval in 2002 and was awarded a one-year Humboldt Research Fellowship with Drs. Wittko Francke and Stefan Schulz. In 2004, he was named the Helen Battle Professor of Chemical Ecology in the Biology Department at the University of Western Ontario (UWO). McNeil was appointed the scientific director of Western's Biotron in 2008 and served a three-year term before stepping down from the position in August 2011. During this time, he was also the recipient of the Fry Medal, given to a Canadian Zoologist who "has made an outstanding contribution to knowledge and understanding of an area in zoology."

Upon stepping down as scientific director, McNeil was appointed to a Distinguished University Professorship which "acknowledges sustained excellence in scholarship over a substantial career at Western." In the same year, he was also named the recipient of the Science Ambassador Award as part of the 2014 Partners In Research National Awards. McNeil was nationally recognized for his "contributions to the study of reproductive biology in insects and for his dedication to increasing public appreciation of science" with the Order of Canada in 2015. He was also elected as Fellow of the Entomological Society of America in 2015. In 2016, he received a $10,000 award through the Natural Sciences and Engineering Research Council’s Individual Award for Science Promotion.

During the COVID-19 pandemic, McNeil was the co-recipient of the 2020 Hellmuth Prize for Achievement in Research which "recognizes faculty members with outstanding international reputations for their contributions in research." He also received funding for her project "Monarch fall migration, overwintering mortality and the effects of defence compounds released by decomposing butterflies on the soil ecosystem."
