= Helen Battle =

Canadian marine biologist (1903–1994)

- Born: August 31, 1903; London, Ontario
- Died: June 17, 1994 (aged 90)
- Education: University of Western Ontario (BA, MA); University of Toronto (PhD)
- Scientific career
- Fields: Marine biology
- Workplaces: University of Western Ontario

Helen Irene Battle (August 31, 1903 – June 17, 1994) was a pioneering Canadian ichthyologist and marine biologist. She was the first Canadian woman to earn a PhD in marine biology and she was also one of the first zoologists to engage in laboratory research (as opposed to field research). She was an emeritus professor of zoology at the University of Western Ontario from 1972.

== Early life and education ==
Born in London, Ontario, she received B.A. (1923) and M.A. (1924) from University of Western Ontario (Western University) and was 16 years old when she started her undergraduate degree. Her master's thesis was on the field of fish embryology. She completed her PhD at the University of Toronto in 1928 under the supervision of Archibald G. Huntsman, whereby she also became the first woman in Canada to earn a PhD in Marine Biology.

== Career ==
From 1929 to 1967, Battle served on the faculty of Western University. Battle's teaching career spanned over fifty years and 4,500 students, involving topics such as the embryology of marine life and teaching methodology. During her tenure, Dr. Battle fought for improving the position of women in universities and encouraged women to study science and go to graduate school. In 1956, Battle became Acting Head of the Zoology Department at Western University, in which she was instrumental in the design and creation of the Biology and Geology Building at Western University. Even after her retirement in 1967, Battle found innovative ways to teach and was one of the first instructors to use television, taping a series of lectures for the Natural Science Centre.

Her research included examining the impact of pollutants on marine life and drinking water through the analysis of fertilized fish eggs. She was one of the first zoologists to actively apply laboratory research methods to marine problems, including histology and physiology methods. She also pioneered the use of fish eggs to study the effects of carcinogenic substances on cell development. She published 37 research articles between 1926 and 1973, in which many of her papers are illustrated with her own ink drawings.

She co-founded the Canadian Society of Zoologists (CSZ) in 1961, and served as president for the society from 1962 to 1963. She was awarded the Canadian Centennial Medal in 1967, and in 1971 was awarded an honorary Doctor of Laws from Western as well as a Doctor of Science from Carleton University. She received the F. E. J. Fry medal from the Canadian Society of Zoologists in 1977, becoming the first woman recipient. She was an honorary member of the National Association of Biology Teachers, and in 1991, the Canadian Society of Zoologists established the Helen I. Battle award in her honour.

== Publications ==
- Battle, H.I. and Sprules, W.M., 1960. A description of the semi-buoyant eggs and early developmental stages of the goldeye, Hiodon alosoides (Rafinesque). Journal of the Fisheries Board of Canada, 17(2), pp. 245–266.
- Shaw, B.L. and Battle, H.I., 1957. The gross and microscopic anatomy of the digestive tract of the oyster Crassostrea virginica (Gmelin). Canadian Journal of Zoology, 35(3), pp. 325–347.
- Battle, H.I., 1944. The embryology of the Atlantic salmon (Salmo salar Linnaeus). Canadian Journal of Research, 22(5), pp. 105–125.
- Battle, H.I., Huntsman, A.G., Jeffers, A.M., Jeffers, G.W., Johnson, W.H. and McNairn, N.A., 1936. Fatness, digestion and food of Passamaquoddy young herring. Journal of the Biological Board of Canada, 2(4), pp. 401–429.
- Battle, H.I., 1932. Rhythmic sexual maturity and spawning of certain bivalve mollusks. Contributions to Canadian Biology and Fisheries, 7(1), pp. 255–276.
- BATTLE, H.I., 1929. Temperature coefficients for the rate of death of the muscle in Raja erinacea (Mitchill) at high temperatures. Contributions to Canadian Biology and Fisheries, 4(1), pp. 501–526.
- Hisaoka, K.K. and Battle, H.I. (1958), The normal developmental stages of the zebrafish, brachydanio rerio (hamilton-buchanan)†. J. Morphol., 102: 311-327. https://doi.org/10.1002/jmor.1051020205

== See also ==
- Timeline of women in science
