= Henry Holmes Croft =

British-born scientist (1820–1883)

Croft in the 1870s

Henry Holmes Croft (March 6, 1820 in London – March 1, 1883 in San Diego, Texas) was a British scientist and educator in Canada. He was the first professor of chemistry at the University of Toronto.

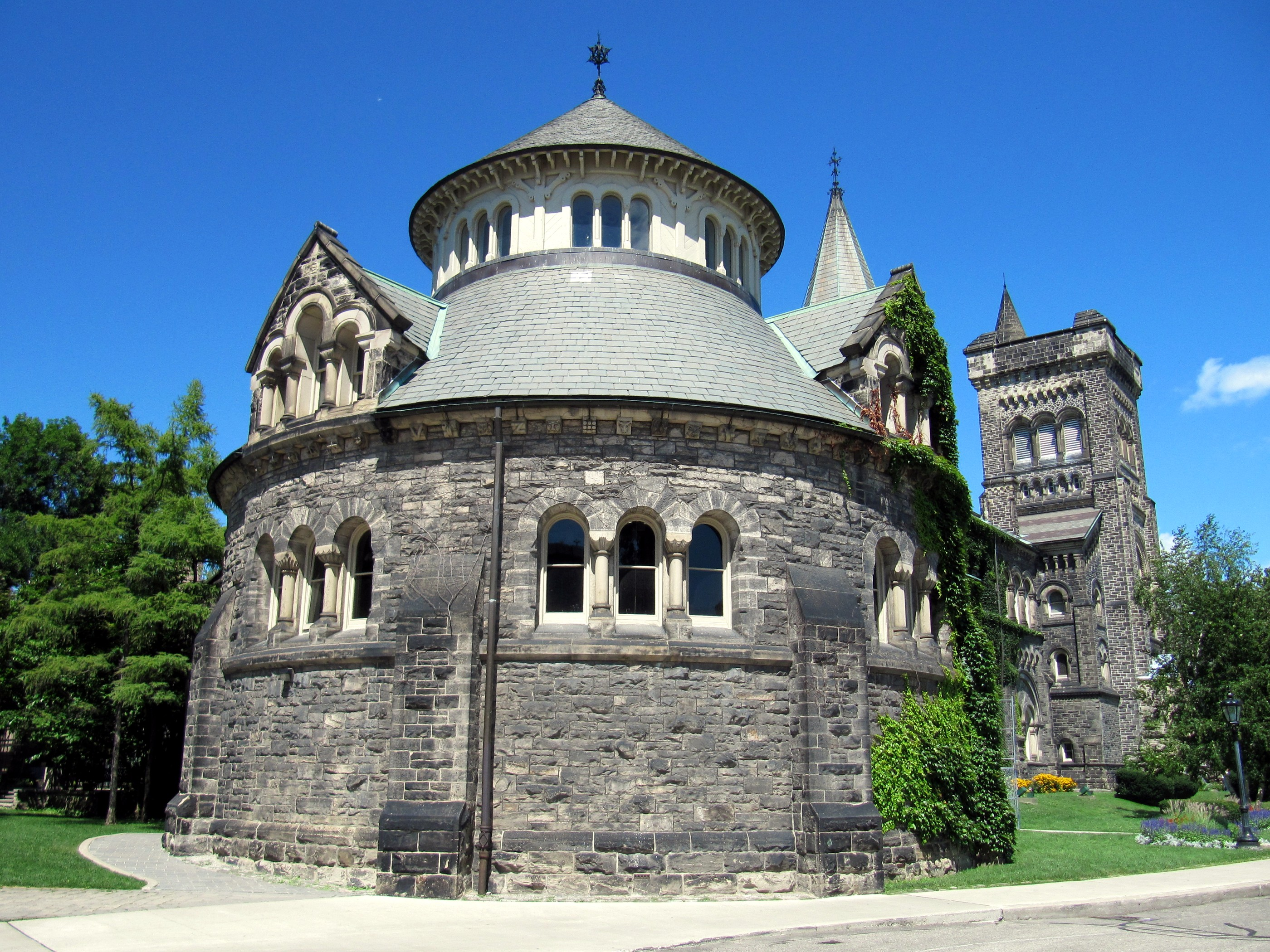
Croft Chapter House, University College, Toronto

Croft was educated at the University of Berlin. He was invited to join the faculty at King's College (now the University of Toronto) in Toronto, arriving in 1842. From 1850 to 1853 he was university vice-chancellor and later with the university senate.

Croft was a member and the founder of the University Rifle Corps (9th Company of The Queen's Own Rifles of Canada) in the 1860s and participated in the Fenian raids as captain in 1866. Croft left Toronto in 1880 to retire to his son's ranch in Texas.

He contributed to the foundation of the Entomological Society of Canada.

The Croft Chapter House, the first part of University College at the University of Toronto to be completed, was originally his chemistry laboratory. It is named in his honour.

Professional and academic associations
Preceded by Sir Oliver Mowat	President of the Royal Canadian Institute	Succeeded by
