= Underwood's septa =

Bone projections in the maxillary sinus

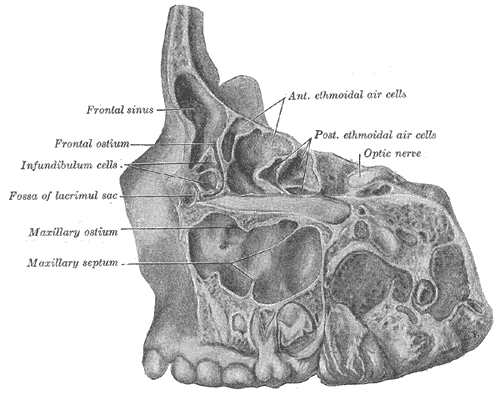
- Specimen from a child eight years, eight months, and one day old. Lateral view of frontal, ethmoidal and maxillary sinus areas, the lateral portion of each having been removed by sagittal cuts. ("Maxillary septa" labeled at center left.)

A short Underwood's septum on the floor of the left maxillary sinus, depicted in a regular dental x-ray film (top), a photograph taken during a sinus augmentation procedure (middle) and in a cone beam CT scan taken for preoperative evaluation (bottom).

In anatomy, Underwood's septa (or maxillary sinus septa, singular septum) are fin-shaped projections of bone that may exist in the maxillary sinus, first described in 1910 by Arthur S. Underwood, an anatomist at King's College in London. The presence of septa at or near the floor of the sinus are of interest to the dental clinician when proposing or performing sinus floor elevation procedures because of an increased likelihood of surgical complications, such as tearing of the Schneiderian membrane.

The prevalence of Underwood's septa in relation to the floor of the maxillary sinus has been reported at nearly 32%.

== Location of septa in the sinus ==
Underwood divided the maxillary sinus into three regions relating to zones of distinct tooth eruption activity: anterior (corresponding to the premolars), middle (corresponding to the first molar) and posterior (corresponding to the second molar). Thus, he asserted, these septa always arise between teeth and never opposite the middle of a tooth.

Different studies reveal a different predisposition for the presence of septa based on sinus region:

- Anterior: Ulm, et al., Krennmair et al.
- Middle: Velásquez-Plata et al., Kim et al. and González-Santana et al.
- Posterior: Underwood

== Primary vs. secondary septa ==
Recent studies have classified two types of maxillary sinus septa: primary and secondary. Primary septa are those initially described by Underwood and that form as a result of the floor of the sinus sinking along with the roots of erupting teeth; these primary septa are thus generally found in the sinus corresponding to the space between teeth, as explained by Underwood. Conversely, secondary septa form as a result of irregular pneumatization of the sinus following loss of maxillary posterior teeth. Sinus pneumatization is a poorly understood phenomenon that results in an increased volume of the maxillary sinus, generally following maxillary posterior tooth loss, at the expense of the bone which used to house the roots of the maxillary posterior teeth.
