= The Canadian Entomologist =

- Discipline: Entomology
- Language: English, French
- Edited by: Suzanne Blatt, Dezene Huber, Amanda Roe

Publication details
- History: 1868-present
- Publisher: Cambridge University Press on behalf of the Entomological Society of Canada (Canada)
- Frequency: Bimonthly
- Impact factor: 1.1 (2023)

Standard abbreviations
- ISO 4: Can. Entomol.

Indexing
- CODEN: CAENAF
- ISSN: 0008-347X (print); 1918-3240 (web)
- LCCN: agr38000066
- OCLC no.: 1553087

Links
- Journal homepage; Online access; Online archive; Journal page at society website

The Canadian Entomologist is a bimonthly peer-reviewed scientific journal covering all aspects of entomology. It is published by Cambridge University Press on behalf of the Entomological Society of Canada and was established in 1868. Volumes 1 to 54 are freely accessible in the Biodiversity Heritage Library. According to the Journal Citation Reports, the journal has a 2023 impact factor of 1.1.
