= Ian McTaggart-Cowan =

Scottish-Canadian zoologist, conservationist and television presenter

Ian McTaggart-Cowan OC OBC FRSC
- Born: June 25, 1910; Edinburgh, Scotland
- Died: April 18, 2010 (aged 99); Saanich, British Columbia, Canada
- Education: University of British Columbia; University of California at Berkeley
- Known for: Nature documentaries
- Spouse: Joyce Racey
- Children: 2
- Scientific career
- Fields: Vertebrate zoology; Natural history; Ecology
- Workplaces: Royal British Columbia Museum; University of British Columbia
- Thesis: Distribution and variation in deer (Genus Odocoileus) of the Pacific coastal region of North America (1935)
- Doctoral advisor: Joseph Grinnell
- Doctoral students: Valerius Geist; Peter Grant; C. S. Holling
- Other notable students: Charles Krebs

Ian McTaggart-Cowan OC OBC FRSC (June 25, 1910 – April 18, 2010) was a Scottish-Canadian zoologist, conservationist, and television presenter. He has been called "the father of Canadian ecology". He was the brother of meteorologist Patrick McTaggart-Cowan.

== Life and career ==
McTaggart-Cowan was born in Edinburgh, Scotland, and moved to North Vancouver, British Columbia, Canada with his family when he was three years old. He completed studies at the University of British Columbia and then at the University of California at Berkeley, where he studied deer under Joseph Grinnell.

Upon returning to Canada, he took up a position at the provincial museum in British Columbia (later renamed the Royal British Columbia Museum) for six years. He next took a professorship at the University of British Columbia, where he established the first university wildlife program in Canada. McTaggart-Cowan was active in early studies of British Columbia Provincial Parks and Canada's Rocky Mountain National Parks. More so than many other ecologists of the time, McTaggart-Cowan stressed the importance of studies of individual variation, in addition to population-based studies.

McTaggart-Cowan supervised more than 100 graduate students; many became eminent scientists in academia and government. According to his own recollection, at one point, the wildlife division of every Canadian province that had one was being headed by one of McTaggart-Cowan's former students. Among the more than 275 publications which he authored or coauthored is the comprehensive, encyclopedic four-volume Birds of British Columbia, to which he was a major contributor.

McTaggart-Cowan had secret annual meetings with American Aldo Leopold and other conservation biologists to discuss educating the public about nature conservation. He warned about the ecological dangers of pesticides and climate change long before they became well-known problems. McTaggart-Cowan acted as an environmental advocate within the confines of the political system, by writing to government ministers. He was influential in the field of wildlife management, ending the previously widespread practice of awarding bounties for the killing of "undesirable" wildlife species in Canada.

McTaggart-Cowan was the head of the University of British Columbia's Zoology Department from 1953 to 1964, whereupon he became the Dean of Graduate Studies. After his retirement in 1975, McTaggart-Cowan served as the chancellor of the University of Victoria from 1979 to 1984.

He was an avid hunter and a respected philatelist.

He was a pioneer of science television, including hosting the series Fur and Feather, The Living Sea, and Web of Life. In total, he was the co-author of six teaching films on mammalian behaviour, 110 educational television programs, and more than 200 radio broadcasts. He was the first to broadcast microscope images of microorganisms on television. He also reportedly started the broadcasting career of David Suzuki by hiring him to follow in his footsteps.

The Cowan Vertebrate Museum in Vancouver was named in his honour, as are a number of awards. He was the recipient of multiple honorary degrees, including honorary D.Sc. degrees from the University of British Columbia, the University of Victoria, and the University of Northern British Columbia, and LL.D. degrees from the University of Alberta and Simon Fraser University. At the time of his death in 2010, McTaggart-Cowan had received more awards than almost any other Canadian scientist.

The Ian McTaggart-Cowan Archive, housed at the University of Victoria Special Collections and University Archives, incorporates more than 7,000 handwritten pages from his field research.

== Personal life ==
McTaggart-Cowan was married for more than 70 years to Joyce McTaggart-Cowan (née Racey), the daughter of his mentor Kenneth Racey. They had a son, Garry, and a daughter, Ann.

== Select awards and honours ==
McTaggart-Cowan's awards and honours included:

- Fellow of the Royal Society of Canada (1946)
- Fellow of the Arctic Institute of North America (1955)
- Fellow of the American Association for the Advancement of Science (1955)
- Fellow of the California Academy of Sciences (1955)
- Canadian Centennial Medal (1967)
- Officer of the Order of Canada (1972)
- Queen Elizabeth II Silver Jubilee Medal (1977)
- Officer of the Order of British Columbia (1991)
