= Brian Hocking =

Canadian entomologist (1914–1974)

Brian Hocking (22 September 1914 – 23 May 1974) was a Canadian entomologist known for his work in medical entomology on blood-sucking flies, particularly black-flies and mosquitoes. He was also a specialist in insect host detection and flight. He was also the author of several popular books dealing with biology and entomology.

== Biography ==
Hocking was born in London, and after school at North Ealing Boys School he went to Christ's Hospital, Horsham. He went to the Royal College of Science in 1933 and was a Murchison medallist in geology. He graduated with a B.Sc. with biology honours in 1937. He worked as an associate and in 1938 he went to India to work as a ferrous metallurgist. In 1940 he taught in a school in India and then served in the British Indian Army rising to the position of a Major and was posted in Lucknow during World War II. He worked on stored grain pests in the Southeast Asian command and while in Rangoon studied filariasis and in Sudan the vectors of onchocerciasis. He joined the University of Alberta in 1946, completing his master's degree (1948) and a Ph.D. (1953) from the Imperial College with a thesis on The intrinsic range and speed of the flight of insects before becoming a faculty member back in Albert, a position he kept for the rest of his life. He was a keen educator, and made numerous TV and radio programs, apart from helping develop the curriculum of Edmonton schools. He received a Gold Medal from the Entomological Society of Canada in 1973. In a review, he wrote that most of the literature on mosquitoes was on Aedes and Culex and that these were unrepresentative of the mosquitoes. He also worked on flight and its efficiency in insects. Hocking also made studies on insects and their associations with the African thorn acacias. He founded a newsletter called Quaestiones Entomologicae and wrote a popular book on insects titled "Six-legged science". He worked on entomology even during his last days as a cancer patient.
