= Charles Krebs =

Canadian ecologist (born 1936)

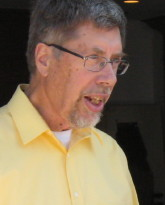
- Krebs in 2007
- Born: Charles Joseph Krebs; 17 September 1936 (age 89); St. Louis, Missouri
- Education: University of Minnesota; University of British Columbia
- Known for: Ecology: The Experimental Analysis of Distribution and Abundance
- Spouse: Alice
- Children: 2
- Scientific career
- Fields: Population ecology
- Workplaces: University of British Columbia; University of Canberra
- Thesis: The lemming cycle at Baker Lake, N.W.T., during 1959-61 (1962)
- Doctoral advisor: Dennis Chitty
- Other academic advisors: Ian McTaggart-Cowan
- Website: http://www.zoology.ubc.ca/~krebs/

Charles Joseph Krebs FRSC FAA FRZS (born 17 September 1936) is a professor emeritus of population ecology in the University of British Columbia Department of Zoology. He is also Thinker-in-residence at the Institute for Applied Ecology at the University of Canberra, Australia. He is renowned for his work on the fence effect, as well as his widely used ecology textbook Ecology: The Experimental Analysis of Distribution and Abundance.

== Research ==
Krebs was interested mostly in smaller mammal ecology; in 1965 he conducted an experiment on voles. He fenced in an area of grassland in an Indiana pasture about the size of a soccer field and observed what happened to the population of voles living inside the fenced area, establishing the widely known "Fence Effect". Within a year of living in the fenced area the vole population had increased by about five times, much more than it would in an unfenced area. The population experienced a crash, just like the unfenced populations. Krebs believed this phenomenon was caused by density-dependent changes in vole social behaviour, and was more widely applicable. The voles had no place to migrate therefore the final crash seemed to stem from an increase of competition, aggressive behaviour, and decreased resources.

Krebs also worked in British Columbia and Northern Canada for over 40 years to look at cyclic populations of mammals. during this time he was helped transform the field of ecology from a descriptive science to an experimental discipline. For 20 years he studied the 10-year population cycle of snowshoe hares and their predators in the Yukon. He found that the population size of the snowshoe hares is regulated by predators such as the lynx, coyote, great horned owls and goshawks. 90% of their deaths were found to be due to these predators and almost none because of starvation and disease.

During his career, Krebs made the case for basic research.

If someone asks me if my work has economic benefit I say absolutely none. And then they ask 'well why are you doing it' and I say that we need to understand the world we live in. It enriches our lives.

— Charles Krebs, Q&A: Dr. Charles Krebs on a lifetime of science, Canadian Geographic

A summary of Krebs's work and his influence on students and colleagues (Judith H. Myers, Stan Boutin, Rudy Boonstra and Tony Sinclair can be seen in a series of seminars entitled [https://www.biodiversidad.gob.mx/biodiversidad/regulacion-de-poblaciones "Krebs' ecologists: on the regulation of animal populations")

== Select awards and recognition ==
- Fellow of the Royal Society of Canada, 1979
- Killam Senior Fellowship, 1985
- President's Medal, University of Helsinki, 1986
- Honorary doctorate, University of Lund, 1988
- Sir Frederick McMaster Senior Fellowship, CSIRO, Australia, 1992
- C. Hart Merriam Award, American Society of Mammalogists, 1993
- Fry Medal, Canadian Society of Zoologists, 1996
- Northern Science Award, Indian and Northern Affairs Canada, 2002
- Corresponding Member, Australian Academy of Science, 2002
- Eminent Ecologist Award, Ecological Society of America, 2002
- Fellows of the Ecological Society of America, 2012
- Fellow of the Royal Zoological Society of New South Wales 2013
