= Vertebrate zoology =

Vertebrate zoology is the biological discipline that consists of the study of Vertebrate animals, i.e., animals with a backbone, such as fish, amphibians, reptiles, birds and mammals. Many natural history museums have departments named Vertebrate Zoology. In some cases whole museums bear this name, e.g. the Museum of Vertebrate Zoology at the University of California, Berkeley.

== Subdivisions ==
This subdivision of zoology has many further subdivisions, including:

- Ichthyology - the study of fishes.
- Mammalogy - the study of mammals.
  - Chiropterology - the study of bats.
  - Primatology - the study of primates.
- Ornithology - the study of birds.
- Herpetology - the study of reptiles and amphibians.
  - Batrachology - the study of amphibians.

These divisions are sometimes further divided into more specific specialties.

== See also ==
- Invertebrate zoology
