= Entomological Society of Canada =

Scientific society in Canada

- Formation: 1863; 163 years ago
- Type: Learned society
- Headquarters: Ottawa
- Website: esc-sec.ca
- Formerly called: The Entomological Society of Ontario

The Entomological Society of Canada or Société d’Entomologie du Canada is one of Canada's most historic scientific societies. The society was founded in Toronto on April 16, 1863. The first Council was composed of President Henry Holmes Croft (1820–1883), Secretary Treasurer William Saunders (1836–1914), and Curator Rev. J. Hubbert. First called the Entomological Society of Ontario, which still exists as the provincial entomological society, it was initially based in London, Ontario before moving in 1906 to Guelph, Ontario. In 1950 the society adopted its present name and moved to Ottawa.

== Presidents ==
- 1863–1864 – Henry Holmes Croft
- 1864–1865 – William Saunders
- 1865–1868 – W. Hincks
- 1863–1864 – Henry Holmes Croft
- 1871–1876 – Charles J. S. Bethune
- 1876–1887 – William Saunders
- 1887–1890 – James Fletcher
- 1890–1893 – Charles J. S. Bethune
- 1893–1896 – W. H. Harrington
- 1896–1898 – J. Dearness
- 1898–1900 – Henry H. Lyman
- 1900–1903 – T. W. Fyles
- 1903–1905 – W. Lochead
- 1905–1907 – J. D. Evans
- 1887–1890 – James Fletcher
- 1908–1910 – Tennyson D. Jarvis
- 1910–1912 – Edmund Murton Walker
- 1912–1913 – Charles J. S. Bethune
- 1913–1915 – C. Gordon Hewitt
- 1915–1917 – A. F. Winn
- 1917–1919 – Lawson Caesar
- 1919–1921 – Arthur Gibson
- 1921–1923 – Frank J. A. Morris
- 1923–1925 – J. M. Swaine
- 1925–1927 – Father Leopold
- 1927–1929 – A. W. Baker
- 1929–1931 – J. G. Detwiler
- 1931–1933 – W. H. Brittain
- 1933–1935 – William A. Ross
- 1935–1937 – L. S. McLaine
- 1937–1938 – Arthur Gibson
- 1938–1940 – Georges Maheux
- 1940–1942 – H. G. Crawford
- 1942–1944 – C. E. Petch
- 1944–1945 – George A. Moore
- 1945–1947 – Alfred B. Baird
- 1947–1949 – G. M. Stirrett
- 1949–1950 – W. N. Keenan
- 1950–1952 – William A. Ross
- 1952–1954 – A. W. Baker
- 1954–1956 – Rev. O. Fournier
- 1956–1957 – Robert Glen
- 1957–1958 – George P. Holland
- 1958–1959 – Malcolm L. Prebble
- 1959–1960 – Brian Hocking
- 1960–1961 – Arni P. Arnason
- 1961–1962 – Anthony W. A. Brown
- 1962–1963 – Christian W. Farstad
- 1963–1964 – Eugene G. Munroe
- 1964–1965 – Bev N. Smallman
- 1965–1966 – Ray Lejeune
- 1966–1967 – Frank O. Morrison
- 1967–1968 – James W. MacBain Cameron
- 1968–1969 – Allen S. West
- 1969–1970 – Ed J. LeRoux
- 1970–1971 – W. F. Baldwin
- 1971–1972 – Philip S. Corbet
- 1972–1973 – Keith McE. Kevan
- 1973–1974 – John R. McLintock
- 1974–1975 – C. Ronald Harris
- 1975–1976 – George S. Cooper
- 1976–1977 – M. Ellen MacGillivray
- 1977–1978 – William G. Wellington
- 1978–1979 – Freeman L. McEwen
- 1979–1980 – William J. Turnock
- 1980–1981 – Sam R. Loschaivo
- 1981–1982 – Glenn B. Wiggins
- 1982–1983 – George E. Ball
- 1983–1984 – Ray F. Morris
- 1984–1985 – Susan B. McIver
- 1985–1986 – Harold F. Madsen
- 1986–1987 – Geoff G. E. Scudder
- 1987–1988 – Edward C. Becker
- 1988–1989 – Doug C. Eidt
- 1989–1990 – Jeremy N. McNeil
- 1990–1991 – John E. Laing
- 1991–1992 – Richard A. Ring
- 1992–1993 – Paul W. Riegert
- 1993–1994 – George H. Gerber
- 1994–1995 – Les Safranyik
- 1995–1996 – Guy Boivin
- 1996–1997 – Stephen A. Marshall
- 1997–1998 – Hugh V. Danks
- 1998–1999 – Linda A. Gilkeson
- 1999–2000 – Dan L. Johnson
- 2000–2001 – Robert Footit
- 2001–2002 – Bernard D. Roitberg
- 2002–2003 – Sandy M. Smith
- 2003–2004 – Charles Vincent
- 2004–2005 – Robert J. Lamb
- 2005–2006 – Dan T. Quiring
- 2006–2007 – Peggy L. Dixon
- 2007–2008 – Terry L. Shore
- 2008–2009 – Paul G. Fields
- 2009–2010 – Maya Evenden
- 2010–2011 – Peter G. Mason
- 2011–2012 – Michel Cusson
- 2012–2013 – Rose A. De Clerck-Floate
- 2013–2014 – Rebecca H. Hallett
- 2014–2015 – B. Staffan Lindgren
- 2015–2016 – Terry A. Wheeler
- 2016–2017 – Neil J. Holliday
- 2017–2018 – Patrice Bouchard
- 2018–2019 – Kevin Floate
- 2019–2020 – Gail Anderson
- 2020–2021 – Bill Riel
- 2021–2022 – Felix Sperling
- 2022–2023 – Chris MacQuarrie
- 2025–2026 – Christine Noronha
- 2026–2027 – Rob Johns

== Publications ==
ESC has published seven distinct publications including:

- The Canadian Entomologist - ESC’s peer-reviewed journal, published since 1868
- Memoirs - Major monographs supplemental to The Canadian Entomologist, published from 1955-1997
- Bulletin of the Entomological Society of Canada - an informational bulletin for members, published since 1969.
- Canadian Journal of Arthropod Identification - Journal contributing to the taxonomy and identification of Canadian arthropods
- Agriculture and Agri-Food Entomological Monographs - Monographs, authored by employees of Agriculture and Agri-Food Canada
- Diseases and Pests of Vegetable Crops in Canada - A book published by the ESC and Canadian Phytopathological Society
- Biological Control Programmes in Canada - A series of publications detailing Biological control efforts in Canada
