= Zed =

Zed or ZED may refer to:

== Arts and entertainment ==
=== Music ===
- Zed (band), a pop-rock group from New Zealand
- Zeds Dead, an electronic music duo from Toronto, Canada

=== Fictional characters ===
- Zed (comics), a character from the Hellblazer comic series
- Zed (Kiba), the main character of the anime series Kiba
- Zed, a character in The Men in Black comics and Men in Black film series
- Zed, a character in Ben 10: Omniverse
- Zed, a character in the film Pulp Fiction
- Zed, a character in the film Zardoz played by Sean Connery
- Zed (Zetto), a character in the film One Piece Film: Z
- Zed McGlunk, a character in the Police Academy film franchise
- Zed Necrodopolis, a main character in the Zombies franchise
- Zed, a playable character in League of Legends

=== Other entertainment ===
- Zed (Cirque du Soleil), a Cirque du Soleil production in Japan
- Zed Group, a Spanish company that markets entertainment products to the mobile phone industry
- Zed Books, an independent academic publishing company based in London, England
- ZeD, a Canadian variety television series
- Zed Plus, a 2014 Bollywood drama film directed by Chandraprakash Dwivedi

== Technology and engineering ==
- Z notation, a formal specification language
- Zed (text editor), a successor to the Atom text editor
- Nissan Z, a Nissan sports car
- Kawasaki Z series, a motorcycle series

== People ==
=== Given name ===
- Zed Bias (born 1969), English musician
- Zed Coston (1915–2003), American football player
- Zed Key (born 2002), American basketball player
- Zed Ndamane (born 1964), South African cricket umpire
- Zed Al Refai (born 1966), Kuwaiti business person
- Zed Saad (born 1997), Qatari footballer
- Zed Seselja (born 1977), Australian politician
- Zed Shaw, American software developer
- Zed S. Stanton (1848–1921), American attorney and judge

=== Surname ===
- David Zed (born 1960), American actor
- Paul Zed (born 1956), former Liberal member of the Parliament of Canada
- Gordon Penrose (aka Dr. Zed, 1925–1997), Canadian science educator

== Other uses ==
- Z (named zed in Commonwealth English), a letter of the Latin alphabet
- Zed Books
- Zed card, a "portfolio on a card" used by models and actors
- Zero-energy development, in architecture
- Zonal Employee Discount, for reduced rate personal travel by airline employees

== See also ==
- Zedd (disambiguation)
- Z (disambiguation)
- Zee (disambiguation)
- Djed, an ancient Egyptian symbol for stability
