= Mary Alice Downie =

American-born Canadian writer

Mary Alice Downie (born February 12, 1934) is a US born Canadian writer.

The daughter of Canadian parents, she was born Mary Alice Dawe Hunter in Alton, Illinois and was educated at Trinity College at the University of Toronto. She married John Downie in 1959. She was a reporter for Marketing from 1955 to 1956; from 1956 to 1957, she was an editorial assistant for the Canadian Medical Association Journal. Downie was publicity manager for the Oxford University Press in Toronto from 1958 to 1959. She subsequently worked as a freelance writer. In 1959, Downie and her husband moved to Pittsburgh; they moved to Kingston, Ontario in 1962. From 1973 to 1979, Downie was book review editor for the Kingston Whig-Standard.

She has also contributed to The Horn Book Magazine, OWL, Chickadee, The Globe and Mail, the Ottawa Citizen and the Montreal Gazette.

== Selected works ==
- The Wind has Wings: Poems from Canada, an anthology of poetry, with Barbara Robertson (1968)
- Downie, Mary Alice; Downie, John (1971). Honor Bound. illus. Joan Huffman. Toronto: Oxford University Press. ISBN 0-19-540192-1.
- Scared Sarah (1974)
- Dragon on Parade (1974)
- The King's Loon/Un huart pour le roi (1979)
- And Some Brought Flowers: Plants in a New World, with Mary Hamilton (1980)
- A Proper Acadian (1980)
- Seeds and Weeds: A Book of Country Crafts, with Jillian Gilliland (1981)
- Jenny Greenteeth. Kids Can Press (1984)
- The Window of Dreams: New Canadian Writing for Children, with Elizabeth Greene and M.A. Thompson (1986)
- Written in Stone: A Kingston Reader, with M.A. Thompson (1993)
- Snow Paws, with Kathryn Naylor (1996)
- Bright Paddles (1999)
- Downie, Mary Alice (2009). A Pioneer Alphabet. Tundra Books. ISBN 978-1459705319.
- Downie, Mary Alice (2010). Robertson, Barbara (ed.). Early Voices: Portraits of Canada by Women Writers, 1639-1914. Dundurn. ISBN 978-1459705319.
