= Annabel Slaight =

Canadian author and former elementary school teacher

- Born: Toronto, Ontario, Canada
- Education: University of British Columbia (did not graduate)
- Spouse: Brian Wright Slaight (1934-2026)
- Awards: Sandford Fleming Medal

Annabel Slaight OC OOnt (nee Gerald) is a Canadian author and former elementary school teacher. She is the co-founder of OWL, Chickadee, and Chirp magazines and a former producer of OWL/TV.

== Early life and education ==
Slaight was born and raised in Toronto but enrolled at the Crofton House School in British Columbia for her high school education. She struggled throughout her schooling and eventually dropped out of the University of British Columbia.

== Career ==
After dropping out, Slaight spent four years as a teacher before moving to Toronto to start a career in journalism. She then spent 10 years editing books and magazines before meeting Mary Anne Brinckman, a volunteer for the Federation of Ontario Naturalists (FON). Together, they established a non-profit entitled Young Naturalist Foundation (YNF) and persuaded the FON to support their children's magazine, OWL. This became the first children's nature magazine to be published in Canada on a nationwide basis and their first issue sold over 8,000 copies. They had initially faced criticism from environmentalists who critiqued the lighthearted tone of the magazine and many were doubtful of their ability to succeed. Despite this, Owl had gained 12,000 subscribers to their magazine, with 1,721 coming from schools, by 1976. The magazine continued to be successful and author Mordecai Richler praised the magazine in Maclean's. By the end of 1976, circulation had jumped to 15,000 and Shell Canada Ltd. gave YNF a $25,000 grant to continue the magazine. Slaight credited the magazine's success due to a growing interest in Canadian content. Within its first two-and-a-half years, the magazine increased circulation to 2,000 copies a month. They also compiled a book of one of their cartoon characters, Dr. Zed, and sold over 60,000 copies in Canada, Britain, and the United States. By 1979, Owl's circulation had hit about 100,000, making it one of Canada's most widely-read magazines. Slaight and Brinckman then launched Chickadee, a magazine aimed at younger readers. The magazine launched with an initial subscription base of 35,000. By 1982, the two magazines had a combined circulation is 195,000, reaching about 10 per cent of Canada's pre-teen children.

The magazine's success resulted in the launch of a television show and a prototype computer video game for Ontario school classrooms. The television show was eventually picked up by PBS and CBC and called OWL/TV. When discussing the show, Slaight described it as more discovery than informational saying: "You give them a little bit about a lot of subjects. You can't tell them everything. The best thing is to have them come away wanting to know more." In one of the episodes, a 13-year-old from Los Angeles explained how he stopped smoking marijuana and started to breed rabbits. Slaight served as an executive producer on OWL TV and helped it get renewed for a second season in 1986. In 1991, Slaight received the Sandford Fleming Medal from the Royal Canadian Institute for her outstanding contributions to the public understanding of science. In 1992, Owl won the EDPRESS award as best children's magazine in North America while A Kids' Guide to the Brain won 1994's Science in Society Book Award from the Canadian Science Writers' Association. While continuing to author Owl and Chickadee through the 80s and 1990s, she also oversaw the production of its preschool equivalent, Big Comfy Couch. The newest television program won the 1993 Alliance for Children's Television Award of Excellence and the 1995 Gemini Awards as the best children's series.

As a result of their ongoing success, Slaight and Gord Haines, former chief operating officer of Alliance Communications, oversaw the launch of Combined Media. As Owl moved away from non-profit to the private sector, Combined Media was established as an umbrella company that owns 90 per cent of Owl Communications and 60 per cent of Mackerel Interactive. Slaight and Brinckman then established Chirp as another children's magazine aimed at the youngest reading level. However, they found that children's magazines had trouble keeping dedicated readers and they subsequently reinvent Chickadee in 1999 to keep its annual readership. Her accomplishments as an author earned her appointments as a Member of the Order of Canada and Member of the Order of Ontario.
