= Penny Park =

Canadian science journalist

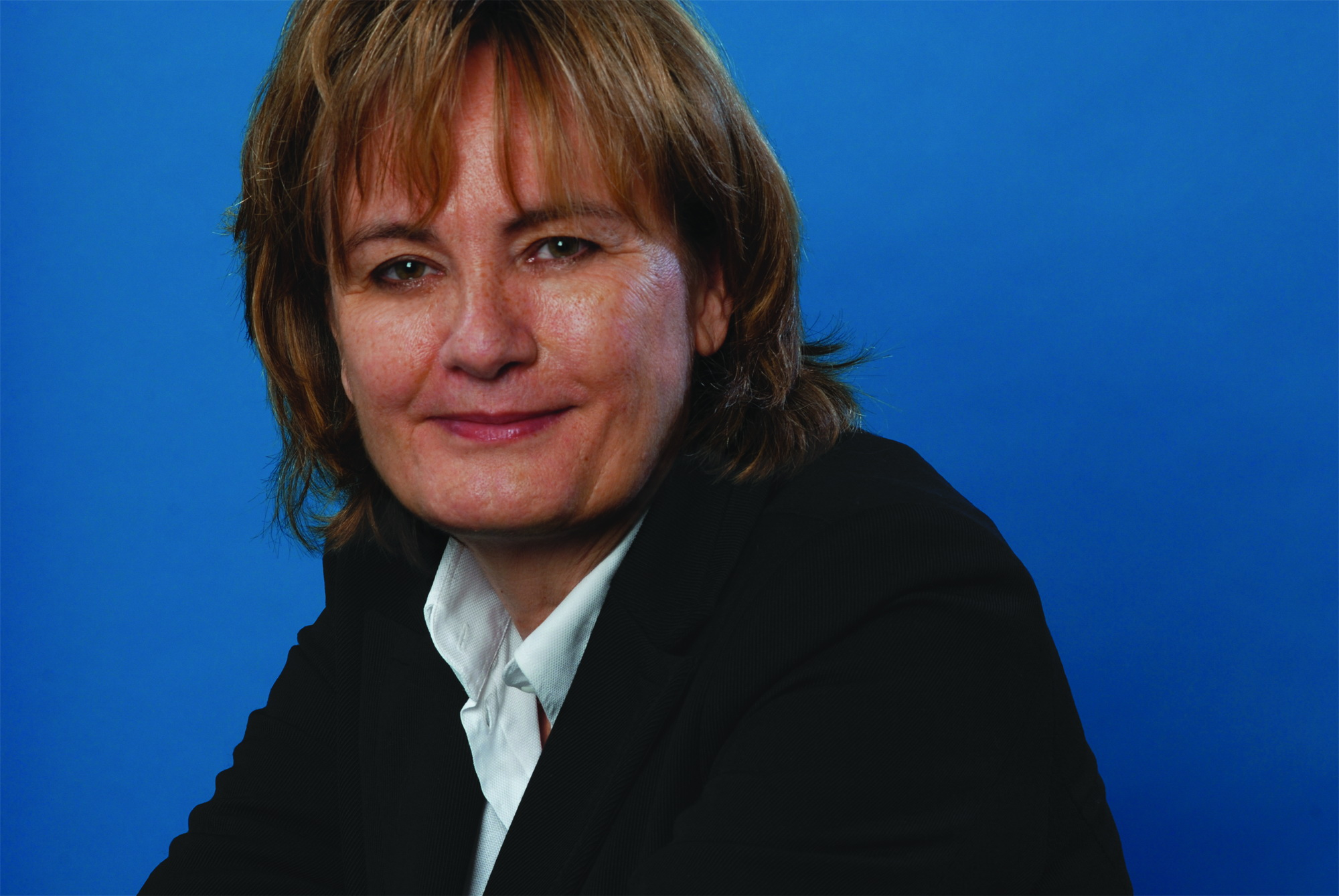
- Park in 2009
- Born: 26 July 1953; Montreal, Quebec, Canada
- Died: 14 December 2018 (aged 65); Toronto, Ontario, Canada
- Education: University of New Brunswick, University of Guelph
- Occupation: Journalist
- Awards: Sandford Fleming Medal

Penelope Dawn (Penny) Park (July 26, 1953 – December 14, 2018) was a Canadian science journalist.

== Early life and education ==
Penny Park was born in Montreal, Quebec in 1953.

She received a Bachelor of Arts in linguistics from the University of New Brunswick, where she worked at the university's radio station. After completing her degree, she worked for as a reporter on a Canadian Broadcasting Corporation New Brunswick morning show covering politics. However, after a few years, she grew dissatisfied with political reporting. She returned to university, receiving a Bachelor of Science degree in biology from the University of Guelph in 1980.

== Career ==
After graduating from the University of Guelph, Park worked briefly at CBC radio in northern Ontario. In 1982, she became a producer on Quirks & Quarks, the CBC's flagship radio science show. She worked as a producer and senior producer on the program for 13 years.

In 1994, Park, along with host Jay Ingram, left Quirks & Quarks to develop the nightly television program @discovery.ca (later renamed Daily Planet) for Discovery Channel. She worked at Discovery for 16 years, as segment producer, senior producer, and documentary maker for Daily Planet.

In 2010, she left Discovery Channel to become the founding executive director of the Science Media Centre of Canada a non-profit charitable organization set up to inform public debate with accurate science. The centre's primary purpose is to serve journalists with accurate information on scientific matters, by providing media alerts about upcoming scientific announcements, giving background information on breaking science new stories, and connecting journalists with scientific experts.

In 2017, Park was the launch editor of The Conversation Canada, a Canadian edition of the independent, not-for-profit media outlet. She has also contributed to UNEP's yearbooks that give updates on selected global environmental issues.

Park died of cancer on December 14, 2018.

== Honours ==
In 2013 Park was awarded an honorary doctoral degree, D. Litt., at the University of the Fraser Valley.

She was the 2014 recipient of the Sandford Fleming Medal from the Royal Canadian Institute for her commitment to excellence and innovation in Canadian science media.
