= Terence Dickinson =

Canadian astronomer (1943–2023)

Terence Dickinson CM (10 November 1943 – 1 February 2023) was a Canadian amateur astronomer and astrophotographer who lived near Yarker, Ontario, Canada. He was the author of 14 astronomy books for both adults and children. He was the founder and former editor of SkyNews magazine. Dickinson had been an astronomy commentator for Discovery Channel Canada and taught at St. Lawrence College. He made appearances at such places as the Ontario Science Centre. In 1994, the International Astronomical Union committee on Minor Planet Nomenclature named asteroid 5272 Dickinson in honour of his "ability to explain the universe in everyday language".

== Biography ==
Dickinson was born in Toronto, Ontario, on 10 November 1943. He became interested in astronomy at age five after seeing a bright meteor from just outside his family's home. When he was 14 he received a 60 mm telescope as a Christmas present, the first of nearly 20 telescopes he owned. Past occupations include editor of Astronomy magazine (1974-75) and planetarium instructor. He became a full-time science writer in 1976. He received the 1993 Industry Canada's Michael Smith Award for Public Promotion of Science, the 1993 Canadian Science Writers' Association Award First Place for Science and Technology writing, and the Royal Canadian Institute's Sandford Fleming Medal in 1992. In 1995 Dickinson was made a Member of the Order of Canada, which is the nation's highest civilian achievement award. The Astronomical Society of the Pacific awarded him the Klumpke-Roberts Award in 1996. He received an honorary Doctor of Science degree from Queen's University in 2019.

In 1983, Dickinson published NightWatch: A Practical Guide to Viewing the Universe. The book includes star charts, tables of future solar and lunar eclipses, planetary conjunctions, planet locations, and other illustrations. The Journal of the Royal Astronomical Society described NightWatch as the essential star-watching guide for amateur astronomers of all levels of experience. The book has become the world's best-selling manual for amateur stargazing.

Dickinson internationally published twelve titles, primarily through Firefly Books.

Dickinson died on 1 February 2023 at the age of 79.

== Publications ==
- NightWatch: A Practical Guide to Viewing the Universe (March 4, 1983)
- The Universe and Beyond (October 2, 1986)
- Exploring the Night Sky: The Equinox Astronomy Guide for Beginners (February 22, 1987)
- Exploring the Sky by Day: The Equinox Guide to Weather and the Atmosphere (September 10, 1988)
- From the Big Bang to Planet X: The 50 Most-Asked Questions About the Universe... and Their Answers (September 1, 1993; Out of Print)
- The Backyard Astronomer's Guide (January 15, 1994, with Alan Dyer)
- Extraterrestrials: A Field Guide for Earthlings (October 1, 1994; Out of Print)
- Other Worlds: A Beginner's Guide to Planets and Moons (September 5, 1995)
- Splendors of the Universe: A Practical Guide to Photographing the Night Sky (November 16, 1997, with Jack Newton)
- Summer Stargazing: A Practical Guide for Recreational Astronomers (April 2, 2005; Out of Print)
- Hubble's Universe: Greatest Discoveries and Latest Images (September 6, 2012)
- The Hubble Space Telescope: Our Eye on the Universe (September 27, 2019, with Tracy C. Read)
