= Dr. Z =

Dr. Z may refer to:

== People ==
- Dieter Zetsche, chairman of Daimler AG
- Doron Zeilberger, Israeli-American mathematician
- Paul Lionel Zimmerman, American sportswriter

== Fictional characters ==
- Dr. Zoidberg, a character in Futurama
- Dr. Z, a character in Dinosaur King
- Dr. Zee, a character in Battlestar Galactica

== Enterprises ==
- Dr. Z Amplification, a manufacturer of guitar amplifiers

== See also ==
- Dr. Zed, pseudonym of Canadian science educator Gordon Penrose
- Suzuki DR-Z series, a type of motorcycle
- Blood Waters of Dr. Z, released as Zaat (1971), an American science fiction horror film
- The Diabolical Dr. Z (1965), a Spanish-French horror film
- Dr. Z on Scoring (2008), a book by Ukrainian-American pornographic film actress Victoria Zdrok
