= André Picard (journalist) =

Canadian journalist

André Picard CM
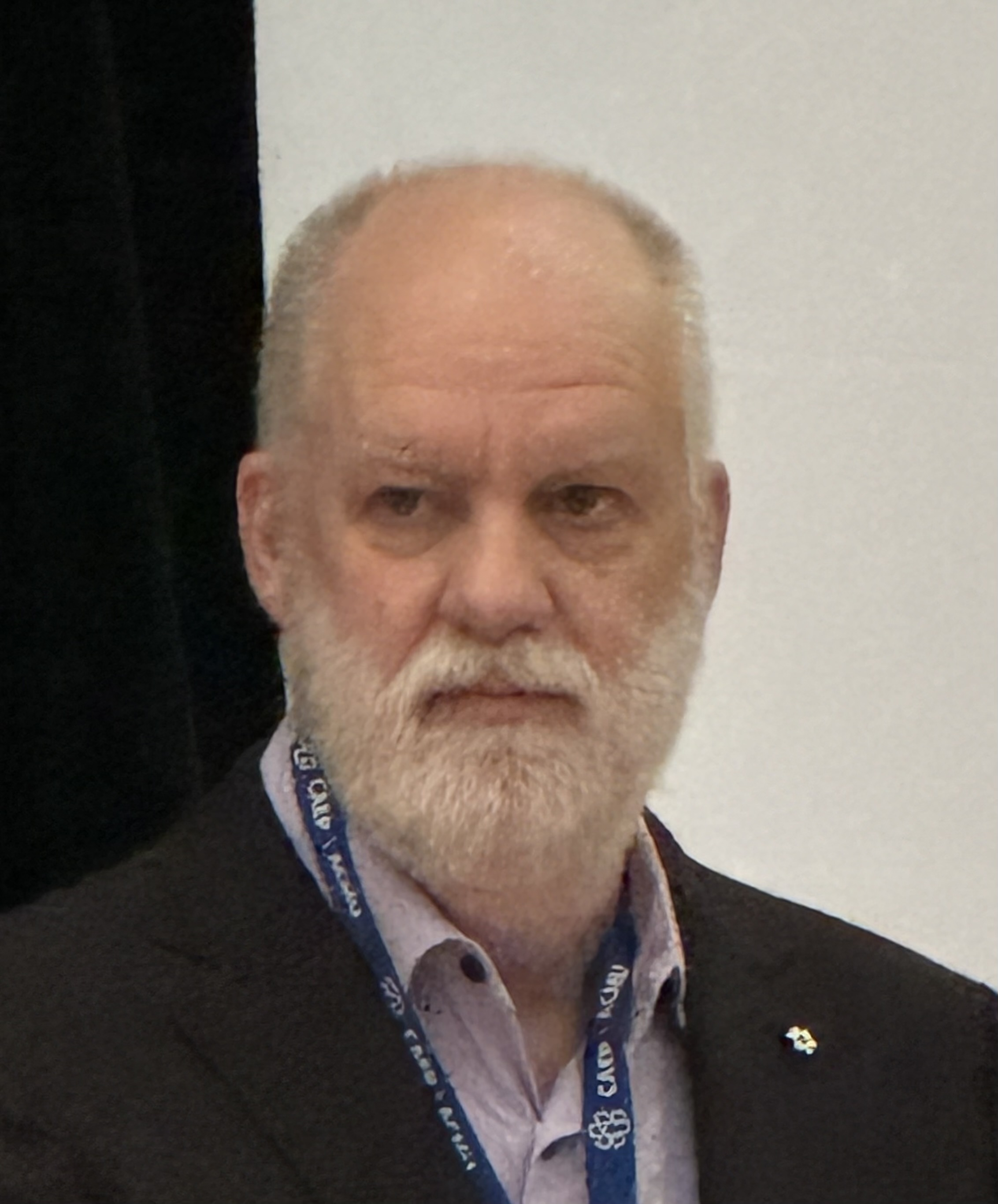
- In 2024
- Born: Ottawa, Ontario, Canada
- Education: University of Ottawa
- Occupation: Journalist
- Years active: 1983–present
- Employer: The Globe and Mail
- Known for: Reporting on Contaminated blood scandal in Canada
- Notable work: The Gift of Death - Confronting Canada's Tainted Blood Tragedy; Matters of Life and Death - Public Health Issues in Canada
- Title: Quebec Bureau Chief
- Awards: Michener Award, National Newspaper Award, Hyman Solomon Award
- Website: www.andrepicard.com

André Pierre Picard CM is a Canadian journalist and author specializing in health care issues. He works as a reporter and a columnist for the national newspaper The Globe and Mail. As of 2020, he runs the news organization's office in Montreal. He currently lives in Vancouver.

== Biography ==
A Franco-Ontarian, Picard was born in Ottawa, Ontario, and grew up in North Bay. He attended the École secondaire catholique Algonquin, a French-language Catholic high school.

Picard attended the University of Ottawa and completed a B.Adm in 1986, but Picard credits his extracurricular activities with having a greater influence on his career. Compelled by a friend to write a music column for the Fulcrum, a student newspaper, he ended up managing the Arts section, before being chosen as editor-in-chief in 1983. His work at the Fulcrum gave him a taste of the impact journalism can have on the community and, ultimately, on public policy. Later, he got a degree in journalism from Carleton University, but credits his years at the student newspaper as his most valuable formative experience.

During his time at the Fulcrum, he met the woman he would later marry, Michelle Lalonde. Their wedding took place on the University of Ottawa campus. They have two children and have lived in Montreal since 1989, where Lalonde writes for The Gazette.

== Career in journalism ==
Picard briefly worked for the Canadian University Press, a news service that provided content for student newspapers. The Globe and Mail hired him in 1987 for its business section. When major news outlets started covering the AIDS epidemic, the Globe transferred him to the general news section and assigned that story to him, since he had already written about AIDS for the Globe as a summer intern. Picard's stories often explored the human side of the issue and went beyond the stereotype of the AIDS victims. He joined other journalists covering health issues differently, enabling a conversation between health professionals, patients and the public.

Health care officially became Picard's beat at the Globe and Mail in 1990. His stories on contaminated blood scandals, with an emphasis on the victims' compensation, contributed to the establishment of a commission of inquiry and ultimately, to regulation changes. He received the Michener Award in 1993, the same year the commission began its work. His first book, The Gift of Death: Confronting Canada’s Tainted Blood Tragedy, was published in 1995 and became a best-seller.

He was one of the first journalists to report on SARS-CoV-2 in 2020 and continued to follow it as the pandemic developed. He was recruited by the Trudeau Foundation to participate in a committee formed to engage and educate the public on the implications of the pandemic.

His book Neglected No More: The Urgent Need to Improve the Lives of Canada's Elders in the Wake of a Pandemic was a nominee for the 2021 Balsillie Prize for Public Policy.

== Published works ==
- Picard, André (1995). The Gift of Death: Confronting Canada's Tainted Blood Tragedy. Harper Collins Canada. ISBN 978-0-00255-415-2.
- Picard, André (1997). A Call to Alms: The New Face of Charity in Canada. Atkinson Charitable Foundation.
- Picard, André (2000). Critical Care: Canadian nurses speak for change. Harper Collins Canada. ISBN 978-0-00255-726-9.
- Picard, André (2013). The Path to Health Care Reform: Policy and Politics. Conference Board of Canada.
- Picard, André (2017). Matters of Life and Death: Public Health Issues in Canada. Douglas & McIntyre. ISBN 978-1-77162-154-0.

== Awards and recognition ==
- 1993: Michener Award for meritorious public service journalism.
- 1996: Atkinson Fellowship in Public Policy, Atkinson Foundation.
- 2002: Centennial Prize, Pan American Health Organization.
- 2005: Public Health Hero, Canadian Public Health Association.
- 2007: Champion of Mental Health, Canadian Public Health Association.
- 2008: Award of Excellence for Health Care Reporting, Canadian Nurses Association and Canadian Medical Association (with 12 other Globe and Mail writers).
- 2009: Best column, National Newspaper Awards.
- 2011: Hyman Solomon Award for Excellence in Public Policy Journalism, Public Policy Forum.
- 2018: Lifetime Achievement Award, Canadian Blood Services.
- 2020: Owen Adams Award of Honour, Canadian Medical Association.
- 2021: CJF Tribute, Canadian Journalism Foundation.
- 2021: Sandford Fleming Medal for Excellence in Science Communication, Royal Canadian Institute for Science
- 2023: Member of the Order of Canada

He received honorary doctorates from six institutions: University of Ontario Institute of Technology, the University of Manitoba, Laurentian University, Carleton University, the University of British Columbia and the University of Toronto.
