= Z33 =

Z33 may refer to:

== Vehicles ==
- Nissan 350Z, model number Z33, a car
- German destroyer Z33, a ship in World War II
- Z33 Free Time, a concept car version of the Alfa Romeo 33

== Places ==
- Art Museum Z33, Belgium
- Aleknagik Seaplane Base (FAA id: Z33), Aleknagik, Dillingham, Alaska, USA; part of the Aleknagik Airport
- Klamath Air Force Station (Air Defense Command id: P-33; NORAD id: Z-33), Klamath, California, USA

== See also ==
- Zee (disambiguation)
