= The Big Comfy Couch =

Canadian children's television series

- Genre: Children's; Educational
- Created by: Cheryl Wagner
- Written by: Cheryl Wagner; Robert Mills; Lynn Harrison McLauchlan; Vicki Grant; Tracey Forbes; Bob Stutt; Robin White; Kate Barris; Harmony Wagner; Shayne Fox
- Directed by: Wayne Moss (1993–1995); Robert Mills (1996–2006); Derek Ryan (2006); Steve Wright (2006)
- Presented by: Alyson Court (1993–2002); Ramona Gilmour-Darling (2006)
- Starring: Bob Stutt; Fred Stinson; Grindl Kuchirka; Taborah Johnson (1993–1996); Gary Farmer (1993); Edward Knuckles (2002-2006); Robert Mills; Jani Lauzon (1993–1996); Jackie Harris (1993–1994); Suzanne Merriam (1994–1996)
- Theme music composer: JP Houston
- Opening theme: "(Are You Ready) to Clown Around?"
- Ending theme: "(Are You Ready) to Clown Around?" (instrumental, lullaby version)
- Composers: JP Houston (1993–2002); George Flores and Angelo Oddi (2006)
- Countries of origin: Canada; United States (2002–2006)
- Original languages: English; French
- No. of seasons: 7
- No. of episodes: 100

Production
- Executive producers: Annabel Slaight; Robert Mills
- Producers: Cheryl Wagner; Robert Mills
- Production locations: Wallace Avenue Studios; Toronto, Ontario (1993–2002); Studio City; Toronto, Ontario (2006)
- Editor: Steven B. Pinchuk
- Camera setup: Multi-camera
- Running time: 25 minutes
- Production companies: WITF Harrisburg (seasons 1–5; presenting station); Nashville Public Television (seasons 6–7; presenting station); Radical Sheep Productions; Owl Communications (seasons 1–4); Benny Smart (season 5; PBS airings); Tadpole Kids (season 6; PBS airings); Amity Entertainment (season 7; PBS airings)

Original release
- Network: YTV
- Release: March 2, 1993 – August 31, 1996
- Network: Treehouse TV (Canada); Public television syndication (United States)
- Release: March 10 – September 27, 2002
- Release: October 16 – December 29, 2006

The Big Comfy Couch (French: Le Monde de Loonette, lit. 'The World of Loonette') is a Canadian children's prop comedy television series about a clown named Loonette and her doll Molly who solve everyday problems on their eponymous couch. It was produced by Cheryl Wagner and Robert Mills, directed by Wayne Moss, Robert Mills and Steve Wright. It premiered on March 2, 1993, in Canada and on January 9, 1995, in the United States on public television stations across the country, airing its final episode on December 29, 2006. The program was also broadcast on Treehouse TV from 1997 to 2011.

== Premise ==
As with many children's shows, the series had a number of staple elements. Loonette performs a daily exercise routine she calls the Clock Rug Stretch. She also reads stories to Molly; has unusual encounters with the dust bunnies who live under the couch; sings themed songs; and visits different places in Clowntown.

When visiting Granny Garbanzo's garden, Loonette encounters the cat, Snicklefritz; Major Bedhead, who delivers mail via unicycle; and Granny herself. The conversation with Granny is typically the episode's teachable moment, in which she offers Loonette some wisdom. Major Bedhead often stops by with gifts and messages from Auntie Macassar (in seasons 1–5) or Uncle Chester (in seasons 6–7).

Loonette is a talented dancer and runs Miss Loonette's Dance Academy, where she dances with dolls and animals. Along with simple lessons and problem-solving, the show also emphasized imaginative play. From season 7, more fixtures of Clowntown are explored: Granny Garbanzo's Cabbage Club Cooking School; Major Bedhead's Clown Chi Dojo and Dancing School; and the Clowndergarten, where Loonette volunteers and helps teach. This imaginative play was also demonstrated through dress-up games and through Loonette's dollhouse, where imaginary sequences play out involving her doll family, the Foleys.

Towards the end of each show, Loonette performs a Ten-Second Tidy to clean up her belongings. All episodes end with Loonette and Molly thanking the viewers and bidding farewell, often with a reminder of the day's lesson, as they settle in for a nap. After Loonette and Molly go to sleep, the sun (from the intro) sets, then a large crescent moon with a clown nose rises above the starry background behind the couch and the credits then roll over a lullaby version of the theme song. The closing credits normally end with Loonette doing an reenactment of "Hey Diddle Diddle."

== Characters ==
=== Main ===
- Loonette (portrayed by Alyson Court in seasons 1–6 and Ramona Gilmour-Darling in season 7) is the freckled-faced female lead of the series. She is a young clown living with her doll, Molly, in their house, on the enormous Big Comfy Couch, an oversized green floral couch. Loonette is gifted in the art of classical dance and runs Miss Loonette's Dance Academy. Another gift she possesses is the very unusual skill to clean just about any mess up in just ten seconds, which she calls the Ten Second Tidy. Initially, Loonette was too young to visit Clowntown by herself, but starting in season 7, Loonette makes frequent trips to Clowntown to visit Granny's Cabbage Club Cooking School and Major Bedhead's Clown Chi Dojo and Dancing School.
- Molly (performed by Bob Stutt) is Loonette's living doll. Loonette found her in a barrel with a sign marked "Free to a good home", and adopted her. Like all dolls, despite moving, Molly doesn’t talk and only communicates via cartoon bubbles, and usually answers Loonette's yes or no questions by either nodding or shaking her head.

=== Additional ===
- Fuzzy (performed by Bob Stutt) and Wuzzy (performed by Robert Mills) are twin dust bunnies who live under the Big Comfy Couch. Only Molly is aware of their existence, much to Loonette's annoyance, and she always does her best to protect them so she can play with them.
- The Foley Family, Andy (portrayed by Fred Stinson), Jim (portrayed by Jani Lauzon), and Eileen (portrayed by Jackie Harris in seasons 1–2 and Suzanne Merriam in seasons 3–5) are a family who live inside of Loonette's dollhouse. They do not speak, and only communicate with their methods of slapstick and distinguishing sounds.
- Granny Garbanzo (portrayed by Grindl Kuchirka) is Loonette's Romanian-accented grandmother and neighbor who loves her and Molly dearly. Her name is derived from the garbanzo bean.
- Snicklefritz (performed by Bob Stutt) is Granny's mischievous cat. He likes to play lots of pranks on the others and sometimes tries to get out of getting flea-baths. The character's name is derived from "snicklefritz", a German slang word for a child.
- Major Bedhead (portrayed by Fred Stinson) is a courier who makes deliveries to people all over Clowntown. He usually makes his deliveries while riding a unicycle though sometimes he will ride something else such as a little car or a bicycle.
- Auntie Macassar (portrayed by Taborah Johnson) is Loonette's travelling aunt who likes to make an entrance whenever she visits. Her name is a pun on the word "antimacassar".
- Wobbly (portrayed by Gary Farmer) is a close friend of Granny's who lives in Clowntown as a traveling repairman.
- Uncle Chester (portrayed by Edward Knuckles) is Loonette's travelling uncle who appears in the show's last two seasons replacing Auntie Macassar.

== Production ==
The show was originally produced by Radical Sheep Productions with what would later be known as Owl Television or Owl Communications (the publishers of Owl Magazine), then Canadian children's television network YTV with a run of 65 episodes. The theme song was written and composed by JP Houston, but the energetic backing vocals were performed by a local Toronto Girl Guide troupe that volunteered for the recording session.

While it is most widely remembered for its extensive run on PBS stations across the United States, the series actually made its official U.S. television debut on TLC on March 2, 1993, as a cornerstone of the newly launched Ready Set Learn! preschool lineup. They were also presented in the United States by Benny Smart, a US children's television production company backed by Ernest creator John Cherry, in conjunction with WITF-TV Harrisburg. In 2001, Tadpole Kids, who purchased the series' U.S. rights from Hollywood Ventures Corporation, commissioned 13 more episodes presented alongside Nashville Public Television. Radical Sheep Productions and Amity Entertainment (which acquired Tadpole Entertainment in 2005 and what was left of it was restarted by the voice of the tadpole), in association with Treehouse TV; a sister channel of YTV, and Nashville Public Television, produced 22 additional episodes focusing on preventing childhood obesity, which debuted on public television stations in 2006.

From 1992 to 2002, the show was filmed at Wallace Avenue Studios in Toronto, and in 2006, it was filmed at Toronto's Studio City.

== Broadcast and syndication ==
In the U.S., the series was syndicated by American Public Television to public television stations in that country, most of which were affiliated with PBS, starting on January 9, 1995, and ending in February 2007, with reruns airing as late as April 30, 2009 on some stations. In Canada, the series was shown on YTV from 1993 to 1997 and on Treehouse TV from 1997 until it stopped broadcasting on February 27, 2011. The show also airs on BTV in Botswana. As of 2023, all episodes can be viewed and streamed on Amazon Prime, Vudu, Tubi, the FilmRise app, and YouTube. From September 1, 1997, to 2001, the French-language dub was aired on Canal Famille in Quebec and on TF1 in France. In the Middle East, the show was also dubbed in Hebrew (which aired on the Hop! Channel in Israel) and Turkish (which aired on TRT 1 and Yumurcak TV in Turkey). The Spanish-language dub aired on Nickelodeon, MGM Channel, Unicable, Canal 5, and Galavisión in Latin America and La Primera in Spain.

== Episodes ==
=== Season 1 (1993) ===
This season was produced in 1992. The episodes were first aired in 1993.

No. overall	No. in season	Title	Directed by	Written by	Original release date	Prod. code
1	1	"Pie in the Sky" "Light as a Feather"	Wayne Moss	Cheryl Wagner and Robert Mills	March 25, 1993	101
Molly and Loonette discover heavy and light.
2	2	"Pinch to Grow an Inch" "Little People Have Big Feelings Too"	Wayne Moss	Cheryl Wagner and Robert Mills	March 16, 1993	102
Molly's birthday is soon and Loonette throws a party for her. Later, they learn about measuring.
3	3	"All Aboard for Bed"	Wayne Moss	Cheryl Wagner and Robert Mills	March 9, 1993	103
Loonette tells about the time when she and Molly couldn't get to sleep very well.
4	4	"Knit One Twirl Too" "When It's Winter"	Wayne Moss	Cheryl Wagner and Robert Mills	March 23, 1993	104
Molly catches a cold, so Loonette makes a pair of mittens for her.
5	5	"Upsey Downsey Day" "Privacy, Please"	Wayne Moss	Cheryl Wagner and Robert Mills	March 2, 1993	105
Molly gets a balloon from Loonette, but it flies away. Later, Major Bedhead, Granny and Loonette play circus.
6	6	"Flippy, Floppy, Fun"	Wayne Moss	Cheryl Wagner and Robert Mills	March 4, 1993	106
Molly flops on the floor and Loonette is in a floppy mood.
7	7	"Something's Fishy Around Here" "Patience, Molly"	Wayne Moss	Cheryl Wagner and Robert Mills	April 6, 1993	107
Loonette and Molly pretend to fish.
8	8	"Scrub-a-Dub" "Squeaky Clean"	Wayne Moss	Cheryl Wagner and Robert Mills	March 30, 1993	108
There is a mess of toilet paper all over the couch, so Major Bedhead, Granny and Loonette make a fun clean up routine.
9	9	"Red Light, Green Light"	Wayne Moss	Cheryl Wagner and Robert Mills	April 1, 1993	109
Loonette and Molly learn about stoplights when they go for a drive.
10	10	"Gesundheit"	Wayne Moss	Cheryl Wagner and Robert Mills	March 18, 1993	110
Loonette can't stop sneezing.
11	11	"Ping-Pong Polka" "I Keep My Promises"	Wayne Moss	Cheryl Wagner and Robert Mills	April 8, 1993	111
Loonette is very energetic after doing a nice clock rug stretch, but unfortunately, she's too energetic to read Molly a story.
12	12	"Funny Faces"	Wayne Moss	Cheryl Wagner and Robert Mills	March 11, 1993	112
Loonette and Molly learn about feelings, later the gang watches a movie about Granny's family in the old country.
13	13	"Snug as a Bug" "Bugs and Hugs"	Wayne Moss	Cheryl Wagner and Robert Mills	May 27, 1993	113
Loonette and Molly discover nature by learning how a caterpillar turns into a butterfly. Later, Loonette reads a story about a bee.

=== Season 2 (1994) ===
This season was produced in 1993.

No. overall	No. in season	Title	Directed by	Written by	Original release date	Prod. code
14	1	"Babs in Toyland" "My Best Friend"	Wayne Moss	Lynn Harrison McLauchlan	March 4, 1994	201
Molly gets jealous when Auntie Macassar sends Loonette another doll named Babs LeBlanc.
15	2	"1-2-3 Dizzy-Dizzy-Me" "1-2-3... Count With Me"	Wayne Moss	Cheryl Wagner	March 23, 1994	202
Loonette sings about counting and flying in her imaginary plane. However, Molly is dizzy from the plane. Later, Loonette gets dizzy from watching a top spin.
16	3	"Wobbly"	Wayne Moss	Robert Mills	March 2, 1994	203
Loonette is angry and in a bad mood when she finds a wobbly toy duck. Wobbly the clown, who's unable to fix it, comforts Loonette by telling her that we just have to accept things the way they are.
17	4	"Jump Start" "Jump for Joy"	Wayne Moss	Robert Mills	February 28, 1994	204
Loonette is in a jumpy mood, later, a thunderstorm hits Clowntown and Major Bedhead is afraid of lightning.
18	5	"This Little Piggy" "Let's Try Sharing"	Wayne Moss	Bob Stutt	March 14, 1994	205
Loonette becomes greedy because she is amazed to find out how many coins were in her piggy bank, but later, she learns about sharing.
19	6	"Juggling the Jitters"	Wayne Moss	Cheryl Wagner	March 21, 1994	206
Loonette gets the jitters about her juggling debut.
20	7	"Hoopla"	Wayne Moss	Robin White	March 25, 1994	207
Loonette searches for her lost ball, later, she, Granny, and Major Bedhead play with a hula hoop from Auntie Macassar.
21	8	"Wrong Side of the Couch"	Wayne Moss	Cheryl Wagner	March 16, 1994	208
Loonette has woken up on the wrong side of the couch, and is in a bad mood.
22	9	"I Feel Good"	Wayne Moss	Robert Mills	March 18, 1994	209
Loonette and Molly learn about feeling good about themselves and play the "What if?" game. Later, Loonette, Granny and Major Bedhead exercise and Loonette reads the tale of the ugly duckling.
23	10	"Boomerang" "Tricks Can Be Tricky"	Wayne Moss	Bob Stutt	March 28, 1994	210
Loonette is in a foolish mood and plays tricks on the others.
24	11	"Make It Snappy"	Wayne Moss	Cheryl Wagner	March 9, 1994	211
Loonette is in a total rush, meanwhile, Major Bedhead is dressed as a cowboy clown.
25	12	"Rude-I-Culous"	Wayne Moss	Kate Barris	March 7, 1994	212
Molly and Loonette make rude noises, but they learn that there is a time to be rude and a time to be nice.
26	13	"Feast of Fools" "Manners For Molly"	Wayne Moss	Robert Mills	March 11, 1994	213
Molly learns about table manners before the gang have a huge dinner party.

=== Season 3 (1994) ===
No. overall	No. in season	Title	Directed by	Written by	Original release date	Prod. code
27	1	"Give Yer Head a Shake" "Know Your No-No's"	Wayne Moss	Cheryl Wagner	July 4, 1994	301
Loonette and Molly learn that no means no, while Snicklefritz hurts Major Bedhead's leg.
28	2	"It's About Time" "Time Out"	Wayne Moss	Cheryl Wagner	July 22, 1994	302
Everyone has a sleepover at Granny's garden. Unfortunately for both Molly and Snicklefritz, they each have to have a time-out and a little lesson in controlling themselves.
29	3	"Clownus Interruptus" "Wait Your Turn"	Wayne Moss	Robin White	August 1, 1994	303
Loonette and Molly learn about patience and the importance of not interrupting when someone else is talking.
30	4	"Why?"	Wayne Moss	Lynn Harrison	August 19, 1994	304
Molly asks "Why?" all the time.
31	5	"Monkey See, Monkey Do"	Wayne Moss	Cheryl Wagner	August 29, 1994	305
Loonette copies everyone, Molly learns about echoes and Loonette learns that being a copycat isn't exactly a good idea.
32	6	"Sticks and Stones"	Wayne Moss	Lynn Harrison	September 16, 1994	306
Loonette thinks Molly is clumsy because she wasn't good at Pick up Sticks, later, Major Bedhead and Loonette make up nicknames for everything in Granny's garden, and they both learn the hard way that calling names isn't really a good idea.
33	7	"Horsing Around"	Wayne Moss	Kate Barris	September 26, 1994	307
Today is National Horseplay Day and everyone is goofing around and laughing but Snicklefritz.
34	8	"All Over and Under" "Dustbunnies Down Under"	Wayne Moss	Cheryl Wagner	October 14, 1994	308
Loonette and Molly discover over and under as they explore their Big Comfy Couch.
35	9	"Pants on Fire" "Honest to Goodness"	Wayne Moss	Kate Barris	October 24, 1994	309
Loonette learns the importance of telling the truth and not to lie.
36	10	"All Fall Down"	Wayne Moss	Robin White	November 11, 1994	310
Loonette and Major Bedhead have fun falling down safely, later, Loonette reads the story of Humpty Dumpty to Molly.
37	11	"Travelling Papers" "Destination? Imagination!"	Wayne Moss	Bob Stutt	November 21, 1994	311
Loonette and Molly want to go to Clowntown; however, they are too young to go there, but Granny teaches them and Major Bedhead that you can explore and travel by using your imagination.
38	12	"Hiccups"	Wayne Moss	Bob Stutt	December 9, 1994	312
Loonette and Molly have the hiccups and try to find a cure.
39	13	"Full of Life"	Wayne Moss	Robert Mills	December 19, 1994	313
Loonette and Molly learn about empty and full and Granny explains to Loonette about the life of a caterpillar.

=== Season 4 (1995) ===
No. overall	No. in season	Title	Directed by	Written by	Original release date	Prod. code
40	1	"Backwards"	Wayne Moss	Story by : Robert Mills; Teleplay by : Cheryl Wagner	March 6, 1995	401
It is National Backwards Day and everything is backwards!
41	2	"Picky Eaters"	Wayne Moss	Story by : Robert Mills; Teleplay by : Kate Barris	March 24, 1995	402
Molly learns about how to try new foods.
42	3	"Forty Winks" "Naptime for Molly"	Wayne Moss	Cheryl Wagner	April 3, 1995	403
Molly refuses to take a nap.
43	4	"Swing-a-Ling"	Wayne Moss	Story by : Robert Mills; Teleplay by : Bob Stutt	April 21, 1995	404
Loonette is in a swingy mood and pretends to play tennis, baseball, and golf, then Major Bedhead reflects about the time he was at the playground as a kid and he learned the importance of safety.
44	5	"Spare Some Change"	Wayne Moss	Harmony Wagner	May 1, 1995	405
Loonette is upset that her name doesn't mean anything. She then changes her name, which surprises everyone.
45	6	"Stuck in the Muck" "Rhyme Time"	Wayne Moss	Cheryl Wagner	May 19, 1995	406
Loonette and Molly make up rhymes and pictures.
46	7	"Gimme Gimme Never Gets"	Wayne Moss	Cheryl Wagner	May 29, 1995	407
Loonette and Molly go on a treasure hunt in the couch and finds a gem. Molly is upset because she wants the gem, while Loonette learns about the importance of not grabbing things, but politely asking for them.
47	8	"One Step at a Time" "You Can do it Molly"	Wayne Moss	Cheryl Wagner	June 16, 1995	408
Loonette and Molly learn about the importance of trying new things, such as climbing the stairs.
48	9	"Enough Already"	Wayne Moss	Story by : Harmony Wagner; Teleplay by : Robin White	June 26, 1995	409
Molly knows that there are real dust bunnies under the couch, but Loonette doesn't believe her. They both learn that there is a time to take a break from something, such as arguing about dust bunnies.
49	10	"Where Do Clowns Come From?"	Wayne Moss	Story by : Robert Mills; Teleplay by : Cheryl Wagner	July 14, 1995	410
Today is Molly's mirthday and Loonette reflects about the time they first met.
50	11	"Are You Ready for School?"	Wayne Moss	Story by : Robert Mills; Teleplay by : Lynn Harrison	July 24, 1995	411
Loonette and Molly play school.
51	12	"Hit Parade" "Be Nice, Snicklefritz!"	Wayne Moss	Story by : Cheryl Wagner; Teleplay by : Bob Stutt	August 11, 1995	412
Molly and Snicklefritz learn that hitting others is not good, then the gang watch a puppet show (featuring Granny Garbanzo and Molly), which teaches them why it isn't good to hit.
52	13	"Comfy and Joy"	Wayne Moss	Story by : Cheryl Wagner; Teleplay by : Robert Mills	August 21, 1995	413
The gang celebrate "The Longest Night of The Year" where they do activities in the snow, give presents to each other, and stay up late.

=== Season 5 (1996) ===
No. overall	No. in season	Title	Directed by	Written by	Original release date	Prod. code
53	1	"Bad Hair Day"	Robert Mills	Cheryl Wagner	March 3, 1996	501
Molly and Major Bedhead have a bad hair day. Molly has tangles and Major Bedhead has come with very long hair.
54	2	"Clownvitations"	Robert Mills	Cheryl Wagner	March 10, 1996	502
Loonette feels like she's left out, later Granny visits Miss Loonette's Dance Academy.
55	3	"Nothing to Do"	Robert Mills	Lynn Harrison McLachlan	March 17, 1996	503
Loonette is bored and can't find anything to do, but she learns that keeping busy is the way to fight boredom.
56	4	"The Big Brain Drain"	Robert Mills	Vicki Grant	March 24, 1996	504
Loonette's forgotten an important promise to Molly and everyone tries to help.
57	5	"One Potato, Two Potato"	Robert Mills	Story by : Harmony Wagner and Shayne Fox; Teleplay by : Harmony Wagner	March 6, 1996	505
Loonette, Major Bedhead and Snicklefritz play a game of keep away with a potato, then Granny eventually teaches everyone about not blaming someone else for your own mistakes.
58	6	"Earth to Loonette"	Robert Mills	Story by : Vicki Grant; Teleplay by : Robin White	March 9, 1996	506
Loonette reads about Molly being a fishing doll, and they both learn about the importance of not daydreaming all the time.
59	7	"Lettuce, Turnip and Pea" "Molly's Potty Lesson"	Robert Mills	Story by : Harmony Wagner and Shayne Fox; Teleplay by : Robert Mills	March 20, 1996	507
Molly wets the Big Comfy Couch which makes her very embarrassed. Loonette helps her learn to over come her embarrassment. Later, Snicklefritz has a flea problem and doesn’t want to take a bath.
60	8	"Time for Molly"	Robert Mills	Tracey Forbes	March 23, 1996	508
Molly tries to get Loonette's attention, but Loonette is too busy having a "me parade".
61	9	"Gizmo Shmizmo"	Robert Mills	Bob Stutt	March 29, 1996	509
Loonette discovers all different kinds of gizmos.
62	10	"Clothes Make the Clown"	Robert Mills	Story by : Vicki Grant; Teleplay by : Cheryl Wagner	August 10, 1996	510
It is autumn and Molly and Major Bedhead try to keep warm.
63	11	"Don't Tell!"	Robert Mills	Cheryl Wagner	August 17, 1996	511
The gang tries not to reveal a surprise about Major Bedhead's birthday which proves to be a challenge.
64	12	"You're a Gem"	Robert Mills	Story by : Harmony Wagner and Shayne Fox; Teleplay by : Cheryl Wagner	August 20, 1996	512
Loonette thinks Molly is a real gem, but she also learns the importance that gems and jewelry are not as important as her doll.
65	13	"See Ya in My Dreams" "Dustbunny Dreams"	Robert Mills	Cheryl Wagner	August 31, 1996	513
Loonette pretends to be a roving reporter and interviews the others about dreams.

=== Season 6 (2002) ===
Due to Court's pregnancy during production, she was unable to film any new Clock Rug segments. Instead, archival footage from seasons 3-5 was used.

No. overall	No. in season	Title	Directed by	Written by	Original release date	Prod. code
66	1	"Clowning in the Rain"	Robert Mills	Cheryl Wagner	March 10, 2002	601
It's a rainy day in Clowntown. When the rain stops, a rainbow comes out.
67	2	"Lost and Clowned"	Robert Mills	Rob Mills	March 14, 2002	602
Molly wants to go Clowntown by herself, but she's too young to do so.
68	3	"Button Up"	Robert Mills	Cheryl Wagner	March 17, 2002	603
Today is Best Foot Forward Day and Loonette must find perfect shoes for Molly.
69	4	"Scaredy Cat"	Robert Mills	Story by : Cheryl Wagner; Teleplay by : Harmony Wagner	March 21, 2002	604
Loonette wears a mask which scares Molly, who later learns from Loonette that there is nothing to be scared of.
70	5	"It's the Thought That Counts"	Robert Mills	Story by : Rob Mills; Teleplay by : Bill Murtagh	May 10, 2002	605
Loonette is searching for "McGuffin" in the couch, then she and Major Bedhead attempt to help Granny to fix her roof.
71	6	"Growing Pains"	Robert Mills	Story by : Cheryl Wagner; Teleplay by : Bob Stutt	May 14, 2002	606
Loonette wants to have a tea party with Molly but she worries about maturity.
72	7	"Donut Let It Get You Down"	Robert Mills	Cheryl Wagner	May 15, 2002	607
Loonette, Molly, Major Bedhead and Snicklefritz compete in a field day competition; eventually Molly (the previous champion) has to accept not winning, which is hard for her to do.
73	8	"Fancy Dancer"	Robert Mills	Story by : Rob Mills; Teleplay by : Toni Mills	May 17, 2002	608
Loonette is jealous that everyone dances better than her, so Granny gives her ballet lessons.
74	9	"The Big Bang Boom"	Robert Mills	Cheryl Wagner	May 21, 2002	609
Today is the Big Bang Boom and everyone has a dinner and watches fireworks. Molly is afraid of fireworks, so she wears ear muffs and Loonette learns to think of others and not only herself.
75	10	"Ain't It Amazing, Gracie?"	Robert Mills	Rob Mills	August 2, 2002	610
Molly finds a miner's hat, then Major Bedhead loses his mail bag but learns that he needs to retrace his steps to find things.
76	11	"Between the Covers"	Robert Mills	Story by : Cheryl Wagner; Teleplay by : Susan Whelehan	August 4, 2002	611
Loonette digs all over the couch for books. Meanwhile, Uncle Chester reflects about the time he was at the library and discovered that reading is important yet fun.
77	12	"Going Up"	Robert Mills	Story by : Rob Mills; Teleplay by : Robin White	August 10, 2002	612
Loonette believes she is not growing up properly.
78	13	"Cool It"	Robert Mills	Cheryl Wagner	September 27, 2002	613
The clowns find ways to cool off on a very hot summer day.

=== Season 7 (2006) ===
Ramona Gilmour-Darling replaces Court in the role of Loonette.

No. overall	No. in season	Title	Directed by	Written by	Original release date	Prod. code
79	1	"Apple of My Eye"	Derek Ryan and Rob Mills	Toni Mills	October 16, 2006	701
Molly eats a whole box of donuts and then becomes very bouncy before getting very tired. At the Cabbage Club Cooking School, Loonette, Molly and Granny make Apple Schmapple Fruit Blaster Muffins.
80	2	"Dat's Da Law!"	Derek Ryan and Rob Mills	Cheryl Wagner	October 20, 2006	702
Loonette learns about the rules and laws. At the Dojo, Major Bedhead and Granny do the tango, but Loonette wants to do it too.
81	3	"Fibberish Gibberish"	Derek Ryan and Rob Mills	Bill Murtagh	October 23, 2006	703
Loonette tells a tall tale to Molly which angers her, meanwhile, Snicklefritz thinks he's a dog. At the Cabbage Club Cooking School, Loonette and Granny really blend things up by reminding themselves, we are what we eat.
82	4	"Slow Down, Clown"	Derek Ryan and Rob Mills	Ben Deutsch	October 27, 2006	704
Loonette is in a superhyper mood and is doing things quickly. At the Dojo, Major Bedhead teaches Loonette how to juggle and that it's important to take things slowly at first.
83	5	"Floppy"	Derek Ryan and Rob Mills	Rob Mills	October 30, 2006	705
Loonette and Molly learn that too much junk food, such as donuts, is not good for us. At Granny's Cooking School, Granny shows Major Bedhead and Loonette how to make a healthy snack and that healthy food is good for us.
84	6	"Clown with a Frown"	Derek Ryan and Rob Mills	Laurel Smyth	November 3, 2006	706
Loonette is in a bad mood. It's a rainy day in Clowntown then it clears up which makes Loonette feel better. She also learns that eating too many sweets, can lead to a mood swing.
85	7	"Rub-A-Dub"	Derek Ryan and Rob Mills	Bob Stutt	November 6, 2006	707
Loonette has trouble doing two things at the same time, then Granny cleans up her garden. At the Dojo, Major Bedhead and Loonette do exercises.
86	8	"Upside Down Clown"	Derek Ryan and Rob Mills	Toni Mills	November 10, 2006	708
Molly plays with an upside down doll. At the Cabbage Club Cooking School, Loonette and Granny make an Upside Down Cake.
87	9	"The Clown Promise"	Derek Ryan and Rob Mills	Cheryl Wagner	November 13, 2006	709
Loonette promises to wiggle and giggle and make mirth on Earth. At the Dojo, Loonette, Major Bedhead and Molly dance.
88	10	"Lost and Found Clowns"	Steve Wright and Rob Mills	Pete Sauder	November 17, 2006	710
Molly tries to find her doll Bloomette. At the Cabbage Club Cooking School, Loonette and Granny make an Upside Down Clown Surprise.
89	11	"Phony Baloney"	Steve Wright and Rob Mills	Robin White	November 20, 2006	711
Loonette learns that telling the truth is the noble thing to do. At the Dojo, Loonette and Major Bedhead do relaxing and calm exercises.
90	12	"Ready, Steady, Go"	Steve Wright and Rob Mills	Toni Mills	November 24, 2006	712
Uncle Chester brings Bon Bons over to the garden, and eventually teaches everyone that while candy is tasty, it's important to have a good diet and include other foods like vegetables in our diet. At the Dojo, Loonette balances on a balance beam.
91	13	"Happy Mirthday, Granny"	Steve Wright and Rob Mills	Rob Mills	November 27, 2006	713
Molly and Loonette try to keep a secret for Granny's mirthday.
92	14	"Popcorn-Y"	Steve Wright and Rob Mills	Bob Stutt	December 1, 2006	714
Molly is in a popping mood and can't stop popping, later, popcorn flies all over Granny's garden. At the Dojo, Loonette learns how to juggle.
93	15	"Peek-A-Boo!"	Steve Wright and Rob Mills	Cheryl Wagner	December 4, 2006	715
It's Molly's first time at Clowndergarten and is shy of meeting all the other little clowns.
94	16	"Ouch!"	Steve Wright and Rob Mills	Fred Stinson	December 8, 2006	716
Major Bedhead has hurt his foot by slipping on a banana peel, summarizes what happened at the Clowntown Hospital and gets a wheelchair to sit in. At Clowndergarten, the little clowns play pin the tail on the bunny, play ball, have a snack, have Loonette read a story and play hot and cold as they depart.
95	17	"Big Blow Hard"	Steve Wright and Rob Mills	Fred Stinson	December 11, 2006	717
Loonette and Molly are on their boat they made known as The Big Comfy Ship and they are pretending to look for treasure. At Clowndergarten, the clowns play with bubbles, and then a huge wind storm known as the Big Blow Hard hits Clowntown and everyone goes into Granny's house for shelter from the storm.
96	18	"Shh, Shh, Shh, Quiet"	Steve Wright and Rob Mills	Susie Whelehan	December 15, 2006	722
Loonette learns to use inside and outside voices. At Clowndergarten, the clowns play the opposite game, pretend to have a baby in their hands to use quiet and loud, play follow the leader, dance, colour and have Loonette read a story.
97	19	"Freeze, Please"	Steve Wright and Rob Mills	Harmony Wagner	December 18, 2006	718
Molly is in a wiggly mood and learns to stay put. At Clowndergarten, the clowns play the freeze game, listen nicely to Loonette reading a story and have a puppet show.
98	20	"Clown in the Round"	Steve Wright and Rob Mills	Bill Murtagh	December 22, 2006	719
Everyone is in a topsy turvy mood as things are upside down. At Clowndergarten, Loonette and the clowns play with the clock rug parachute, play the beehive game, play dress up, do the clock rug stretch and watch a puppet show.
99	21	"Molly's Bellybutton"	Steve Wright and Rob Mills	Robin White	December 25, 2006	720
Molly's bellybutton is dangling down. At Clowndergarten, the clowns play Head, Shoulders, Knees and Toes, play with the clock rug parachute, play with hula hoops and have a parade with costumes.
100	22	"Just Purrfect"	Steve Wright and Rob Mills	Harmony Wagner	December 29, 2006	721
Loonette pretends to be a cat. At Clowndergarten, the clowns play kitty cat.

== Home media ==
Time-Life Video was the main home media distributor for the Big Comfy Couch, releasing the series under Time-Life Video's children's label, Time-Life Kids. VHS releases were also released on May 10, 2000, by Goldhil Video.

The Big Comfy Couch has five DVDs featuring Ramona Gilmour-Darling. The DVDs and VHS tapes that feature Alyson Court are now out of print, but can be found on certain websites such as Amazon.com.

On July 30, 2013, TGG Direct released the first two seasons on DVD in Region 1 for the very first time. Seasons 3–7 were released on August 6, 2013. Each set comes with a bonus disc featuring a premiere episode of the following season. The Season 7 set, however, has a bonus disc of the premiere episode of the first season.

== Merchandise and other media ==
Throughout the years, several merchandise has been sold under the show's banner such as videotapes, DVDs, books, dolls, toys and puzzles.

=== Album releases ===
Several albums of the original songs written by JP Houston and performed by the cast were released on August 9, 2005, by Time-Life, as well as Naxos Music.

=== App releases ===
In 2015 and 2016, Radical Sheep, in association with Sticky Brain Studios, released some apps based on the series.

- Just Ask Molly - Released April 1, 2015, this app allows the player to ask Molly any question, and she can communicate to the player via her thought bubbles.
- Fuzzy Wuzzy Fun - Released April 1, 2015, this app features the dust bunnies Fuzzy and Wuzzy playing hide and seek. The objective for the player is to help them find each other by navigating through paths.
- Clock Rug Time - Released May 18, 2015, this app features Loonette and her clock rug stretch routine. Loonette can set the time for the player in both analog and digital. This app can also be used as an alarm clock. The app can also display the weather and temperature based on location.
- Molly's Big Day - Released May 17, 2016, this app focuses on Molly and her big first day in Clowndergarten with the use of activities for the player.

=== This Hour Has 22 Minutes ===
On the October 18, 2016 episode of This Hour Has 22 Minutes, in a segment discussing the 2016 clown sightings, Loonette made an appearance as the show's "clown correspondent." This marked the character's first television appearance in a decade since the show's finale in 2006 and the first time Alyson Court had portrayed Loonette on TV since her departure in 2002.

=== Tours ===
The Big Comfy Couch has had a few live shows at Londonderry Mall in Edmonton, Alberta and sometimes in Calgary and rarely in Regina, Saskatchewan. There was a tour through South Western Ontario in 2001.

==== Loonette and Molly Live Theatrical Tour ====
In 2005, a live theatrical production entitled Molly's Fool Moon Festival toured in Canada. The show included Loonette, Molly, Granny Garbanzo, Major Bedhead and others. The show was produced by Koba Entertainment and presented by Paquin Entertainment Group. The production starred a variety of Canadian actors such as Laura Kolisnyk, Andrew Nolan, Daniel J. Craig, Alexandra Herzog, Dawn Johnson, and others.
