= Lydia Dotto =

Canadian journalist, author and photographer (1949–2022)

- Born: May 29, 1949; Cadomin, Alberta
- Died: September 17, 2022 (aged 73); Peterborough, Ontario
- Citizenship: Canada
- Education: Carleton University; Austin O'Brien Catholic High School
- Occupations: Journalist, Author, Photographer
- Writing career
- Subjects: Space, Environment
- Notable awards: Sandford Fleming Award 1983

Lydia Dotto (1949–2022) was a Canadian science journalist and author, a wildlife photographer, and an educator on science communication. Dotto's best known book is Storm Warning, a 1999 non-fiction work on climate change and its predicted effects. Dotto worked as an arctic diver and trained in zero gravity flight prior to her writing career.

== Career ==
Dotto was a journalist with the Edmonton Journal in 1969 and with the Toronto Star between 1970 and 1971. She graduated with an Honours degree from Carleton University School of Journalism in 1971. Her articles were published in The Globe and Mail, Canadian Business and en Route among others. Dotto was staff science writer for The Globe and Mail from 1972–1978. Her writing on nuclear terrorism, high-energy physics, global warming and other topics earned awards from the Canadian Science Writers' Association.

She completed two dives under the Arctic ice for an article on cold-water diving. She covered space missions including Skylab, Apollo, the Space Shuttle and the International Space Station. She was the first female member of the press corps permitted aboard the USS Ticonderoga aircraft carrier to cover the splashdown of Skylab 4 astronauts.

Dotto's association with NASA and the Canadian Space Agency continued even after leaving The Globe and Mail, in part through her rapport with astronauts Chris Hadfield and Marc Garneau. She held interviews with Canadian astronauts and participated in a zero-gravity training flight at the Johnson Space Centre. Through her skills and sources, Dotto published books and articles on space and the environment to become a leading freelance science writer and environmental journalist (see Bibliography).

Dotto was President of the Canadian Science Writers' Association from 1979–1980 and executive editor of Canadian Science News Service from 1982–1992. For her accomplishments, she was awarded the Sandford Fleming Medal for science communication by the Royal Canadian Institute in 1983. She was chosen to give a talk on "Planet Earth as a Life Support System" for the 1990 Royal Astronomical Society of Canada General Assembly.

The year she turned 65, Dotto shifted her focus to wildlife photography. Wildlife magazines published her pictures from Canada, Costa Rica, Tanzania and elsewhere. Starting in 2005, Dotto taught environmental communication at Trent University close to her home in Peterborough, Ontario and led science writing and communication workshops.

== Personal life and legacy ==
Lydia Dotto was born to August and Assunta Dotto in Cadomin, Alberta, moving to Edmonton when she was a few years old. She has a younger sister, Terry. Dotto attended the first Beatles concert in Canada at Empire Stadium in Vancouver and was a lifelong Beatles fan. Lydia graduated from Austin O'Brien Catholic High School in 1968. In her online art store, Dotto stated "I enjoy merging diverse artistic paths, never knowing where they will take me but always enjoying the journey".

Lydia Dotto died September 17, 2022 in Peterborough, Ontario. Her archives are held by and available for research in Special Collections & Archives at the University of Waterloo.

== Bibliography ==
- Dotto, Lydia; Schiff, Harold (1978). The Ozone War. Doubleday. ISBN 978-0-38512-927-5.
- Dotto, Lydia (1986). Planet Earth in jeopardy: environmental consequences of nuclear war. Wiley. ISBN 978-0-47199-836-5.
- Dotto, Lydia (1987). Canada in Space. Irwin Pub. ISBN 978-0-77251-559-9.
- Conference Report: Dotto, Lydia (1988). Thinking the unthinkable: civilization and rapid climate change. Wilfrid Laurier Univ. Press. ISBN 978-0-88920-968-8.
- Dotto, Lydia (1990). Asleep in the fast lane: the impact of sleep on work. Stoddart Publishing Company. ISBN 978-0-77372-286-6.
- Dotto, Lydia (1990). Losing sleep: how your sleeping habits affect your life. Quill/William Morrow. ISBN 978-0-68811-275-2.
- Dotto, Lydia (1991). Blue planet: a portrait of Earth. Smithsonian Institution and Lockheed Corporation. ISBN 978-0-81092-472-7.
- Dotto, Lydia (1993). The astronauts: Canada's voyageurs in space. Stoddart. ISBN 978-0-77372-707-6.
- Dotto, Lydia (1999). Storm warning: gambling with the climate of our planet. Doubleday Canada. ISBN 978-0-38525-790-9.
  - French Translation: Le ciel nous tombe sur la tête: sommes-nous entrain de risquer le climat de notre planète? (2001)
- Encyclopedia Article: Canadian Space Agency
