= Fernand Seguin =

Canadian biochemist (1922–1988)

Fernand Seguin CC OQ
- Born: June 9, 1922; Montreal, Quebec, Canada
- Died: June 19, 1988 (aged 66); Montreal, Quebec
- Awards: Kalinga Prize (1977)
- Scientific career
- Fields: Biochemistry

Fernand Seguin (June 9, 1922 – June 19, 1988) was a Canadian biochemist, professor and host of science programs on radio and television.

Seguin, who hosted a program on Radio-Canada's TV network in 1954, is believed to be the first broadcaster to present a science program on television in Canada.

He was the first Canadian to receive the UNESCO Kalinga Prize for the Popularization of Science, the only other being David Suzuki in 1986. His nomination was advanced as the inaugural act of l’Association des communicateurs scientifiques du Québec (ACS).

== Honours ==
- 1952 – co-winner of a Canadian Radio Award from the Canadian Association for Adult Education for his radio programme Carte blanche in the "light entertainment" category.
- 1961 – Médaille Archambault (medal) from l’Association canadienne-française pour l’avancement des sciences (French-Canadian Association for the Advancement of Science) for his writings and films that popularized science topics. The medal was "presented annually for works of outstanding practical merit by French-speaking scientists".
- 1968 – co-winner of the Prix Mandarine for his interview television programme Le Sel de la semaine.
- 1968 – Trophée "Méritas" (award) for best television interviewer, as determined by a vote of readers of the newspapers and magazines of Publications Péladeau.
- 1975 – Honorary doctorate from Université de Sherbrooke.
- 1977 – Prix de journalisme Olivar-Asselin (journalism award) from La Société Saint-Jean-Baptiste de Montréal "for his work in making scientific matters understandable to the public."
- 1978 – UNESCO Kalinga Prize (1977) for the Popularization of Science.
- 1978 – Officer of the Order of Canada; promoted to Companion in 1988.
- 1979 – Honorary doctorate from Concordia University.
- 1979 – co-winner of the Prix de journalisme Judith-Jasmin (journalism award) from Cercle des femmes journalistes (Circle of Women Journalists) for a television documentary on cancer.
- 1980 – Honorary doctorate from Université de Montréal.
- 1983 – Honorary doctorate from Université du Québec.
- 1985 – Officer of the National Order of Quebec.
- 1988 – Sandford Fleming Medal from the Royal Canadian Institute "en reconnaissance de son travail inlassable pour la communication des connaissances scientifiques" (in recognition of his tireless work in the communication of scientific knowledge).
- 1988 – Member Emeritus of l’Association canadienne-française pour l’avancement des sciences.
- 1988 – Prix du Grand public (literary award) by a vote of the readers of the La Presse newspaper for his book Le cristal et la chimère.

== Legacy ==
- 1979 – Médaille Fernand-Seguin (medal) was established in his honour at Université de Sherbrooke for students excelling in biology, chemistry, mathematics, and physics.
- 1988 – École Fernand-Seguin (primary school) in Montréal was named in his honour.
- 1989 – Bourses Fernand-Seguin (scholarships) were named in his honour by l’Association canadienne-française pour l’avancement des sciences. The scholarships were previously known as Concours de journalisme scientifique (Science Journalism Contests) since their establishment in December 1981. (Note: The Concours de journalisme scientifique were established by the Government of Quebec in December 1981 for presentations in 1982. The Association assumed administration of the Concours in December 1986 for presentations in 1987.)
- 1989 – Mont Fernand-Seguin in Gaspésie National Park was named in his honour.
- 1989 – Parc (Centre écologique) Fernand-Seguin in Châteauguay was named in his honour.
- 1989 – École Fernand-Seguin (primary school) in Sainte-Foy was named in his honour.
- 1991 – École Fernand-Seguin (secondary school) in Candiac was named in his honour.
