= Austin O'Brien Catholic High School =

High school in Edmonton, Alberta (est. 1963)

Location
- 6110 - 95 Avenue NW; Edmonton, Alberta, T6B 1A5; Canada; 53°32′07″N 113°25′36″W

Information
- School type: Secondary school
- Motto: "Many Gifts, One Spirit!"
- Religious affiliation: Roman Catholic/Ukrainian Catholic
- Founded: 1963
- School board: Edmonton Catholic School District
- Superintendent: Lynnette Anderson
- Area trustee: Alene Mutala
- School code: 8402
- Principal: Kyle O'Hara VP: Gina Carducci, Ronald Zacharko, Paul Horpyniuk
- Grades: 10-12
- Enrollment: 1000: Gr. 10 - 360; Gr. 11 - 360; Gr. 12 - 280
- Language: English, French, Ukrainian, Spanish
- Colours: Green, black and white
- Team name: Austin O'Brien Crusaders
- Website: www.austinobrien.ecsd.net

Austin O'Brien (AOB) is a Catholic high school located in the Ottewell community of southeast Edmonton, Canada. It has about 1000 students.

== Namesake ==
Austin O'Brien was named after Sir Austin O'Brien, the superintendent of Edmonton Catholic Schools from 1924 to 1961.

== History ==
Austin O'Brien was opened in 1963 when Edmonton had 18,000 students in the Catholic system and had 55 schools.

The school's Ukrainian-language program began in 1983, and teaches Ukrainian language arts as well as religious studies.

== Notable alumni ==
- Johnny Boychuk, New York Islanders (NHL)
- Gene Principe, journalist
- Dustin Cherniawski, CFL football player (Saskatchewan Roughriders)
- Don Davies (1981), Member of Parliament for Vancouver Kingsway, B.C.
- Lydia Dotto, science journalist, author and photographer
- Gordon Hinse, CFL player
- Dexter Janke (Calgary Stampeders)
- Pete Lavorato, Edmonton Eskimos football team (CFL)
- Karrick Martin, curler (multiple Brier appearances)
- Pat McCallum, professional curler (WCT)
- Vikki Moss, singer (left before obtaining diploma)
- Morris Panych, Canadian Playwright
- Terriss Paliwoda, CFL Player
- John Stanton, The Running Room
- Mark Connolly, Broadcaster

== See also ==
- Edmonton Catholic School District
