= Latvian Canadians =

Ethnic group in Canada

Kanādas latvieši (Latvian) Canadiens lettons (French)
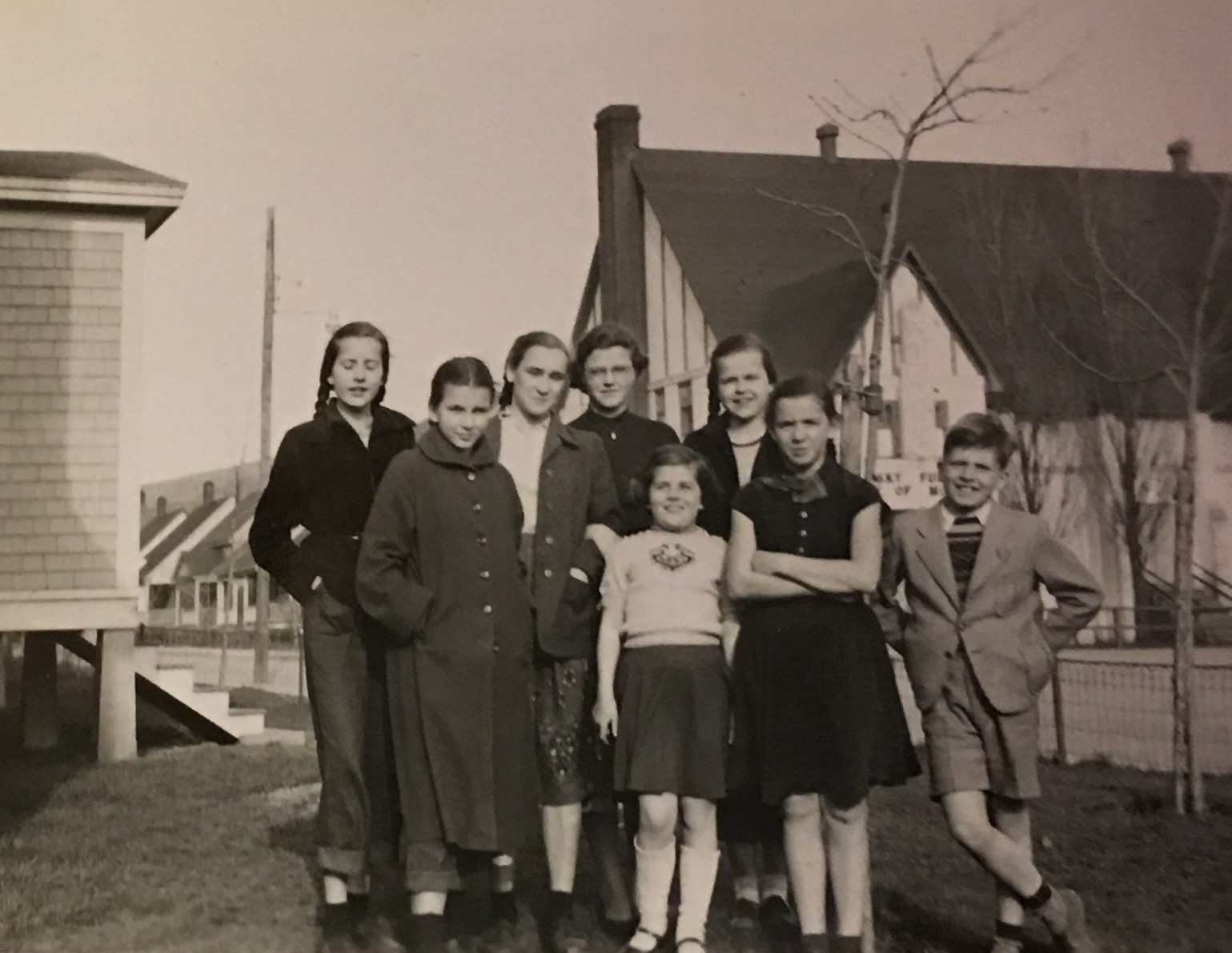
- Children from Latvia in Fredericton, New Brunswick

Total population
- 27,355 (by ancestry, 2011 Census)

Regions with significant populations
- Toronto, Vancouver, Hamilton, Montreal

Languages
- Latvian, Canadian English, German, Russian, Polish

Religion
- Lutheran, Roman Catholic and Protestant, Judaism

Related ethnic groups
- Other Latvians, Baltic German Canadians

Latvian Canadians (Latvian: Kanādas latvieši) are Canadians of full or partial Latvian descent. At the 2011 census, there were about 27,355 people of Latvian descent in Canada.

== History ==
Although by 1921 the Canadian government considered all persons from the Baltic provinces to be Russians, it is known that there were some Latvians living in Canada in those years, because in 1961, 379 Latvian indicated that they had arrived in Canada prior to 1921, and most probably left Latvia after the 1905 Revolution. Between 1921 and 1945, 409 Latvians arrived to Canada, although in the 1941 census listed 975 people claimed Latvian origin. After the Second World War in 1947, many Latvians moved to Canada as war refugees. This migration, which accounted for 92% of Latvians who immigrated to the country between 1921 and 1965, ended in 1957. Many of these Latvians worked in the agricultural areas during their first years in Canada, but soon settled in cities. By 1961, only 10% of those immigrants lived in rural zones and farms (6% in rural areas and 4% on farms). The majority of Latvian immigrants in Canada in 1991 were women, 775 more women than men.

== Demography ==
Although before 1939, 78 percent of Latvians lived in the three prairie provinces, and only 12 percent in Ontario, since 1945 over 70 percent of Latvians live in Ontario and only about 10 percent in Quebec, while the prairie provinces have only had 11 percent of new Latvian immigrants. By 1991, 20,445 persons indicated they were of Latvian descent, most of them living in the capital, 14 percent in the prairie provinces, 12 percent in British Columbia, 5.9 percent in Quebec, and 1.8 percent in the Atlantic region.

In 1991, the largest populations of Latvian Canadians are in Toronto, Vancouver, Hamilton, Ottawa, and Montreal, Quebec.

== Religion ==
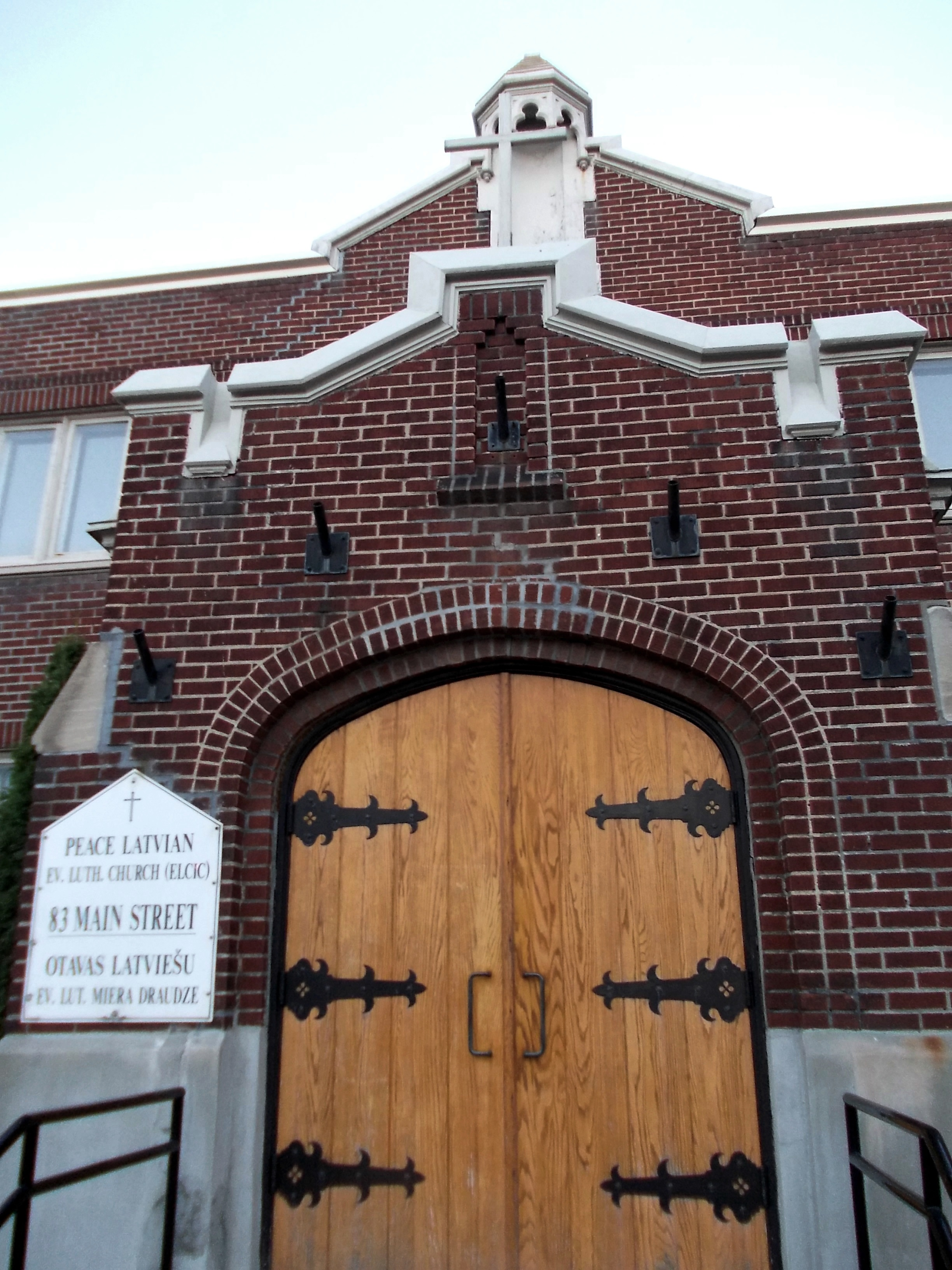
Peace Latvian Lutheran Church in Ottawa

Most Latvian Canadians are Christians: close to 90 percent are Lutheran, 10 percent Roman Catholic, and 1 percent Baptist. The organization of Lutheran congregations in Canada is in regional dioceses, which belong to the Lutheran Evangelical Church in Exile. In 1970 there were 1,400 Latvian-Canadian Roman Catholics. On a parish basis they are connected to the larger Roman Catholic Church in Canada. In the Toronto archdiocese is The Association of Canadian Latvian Catholics, founded in 1949. On the other hand, Latvian Baptists are much less numerous in Canada: only 200. However they have a very active congregation in Toronto.

== Notable people ==
- Harry Adaskin, violinist, academic, and radio broadcaster
- Murray Adaskin, violinist, composer, conductor and teacher
- David Bezmozgis, writer and filmmaker
- Fred Bruemmer, nature photographer and researcher
- Sarmite Bulte, lawyer, advocate and politician
- Sylvia Burka, ice speed skater
- Ludmilla Chiriaeff, ballet dancer, choreographer, teacher, and company director
- Misha Cirkunov, former UFC fighter
- Peter Dreimanis, rock singer (July Talk)
- Kārlis Irbītis, aeroplane designer
- Henriette Ivanans, actress
- Miervaldis Jurševskis, chess master
- Jānis Kalniņš, composer and conductor
- Tālivaldis Ķeniņš, composer
- Elizabeth Lazebnik, filmmaker
- Maris Martinsons, professor of management (top 2% scientist) and business consultant
- Miriam McDonald, actress
- Andrew Podnieks, author and ice hockey historian
- Imants Kārlis Ramiņš, composer, best known for his choral compositions
- Andy Rautins, basketball executive and former player
- Margaret Romans, supercentenarian, oldest living Canadian person
- Signe Ronka, figure skater
- Haralds Šnepsts, former professional ice hockey player
- Ksenia Solo, actress and former ballet dancer
- Katie Stelmanis, musician
- Pēteris Tabūns, politician
- Vaira Vīķe-Freiberga, professor and interdisciplinary scholar at the University of Montreal; 6th President of Latvia
- Moses Znaimer, founder of Citytv, executive of CHUM Limited and Zoomer Media

== See also ==
- Canada–Latvia relations
- European Canadians
- Jewish Canadians
- Latvian Americans
