= Zedd (disambiguation) =

Zedd (born 1989) is a German music producer and DJ.

Zedd may also refer to:

- Lord Zedd, a fictional character in the Power Rangers television series
- Zeddicus Zu'l Zorander, a fictional character in the Sword of Truth fantasy series by Terry Goodkind
- Nick Zedd (1958–2022), American filmmaker

== See also ==
- Z (disambiguation)
- Zed (disambiguation)
