= Ramona Gilmour-Darling =

Canadian actress (born 1975)

- Born: 1975 (age 50–51)
- Other name: Ramona Darling
- Occupation: Actress
- Years active: 2006–present

Ramona Gilmour-Darling (born 1975) is a Canadian actress.

== Career ==
In 2006, she began portraying Loonette the Clown (taking over for Alyson Court, who played the original Loonette from Seasons 1-6) on the Canadian children's television series The Big Comfy Couch for the seventh and final season, which aired in Canada on Treehouse and on various PBS stations in the United States. She has also appeared on stage in leading roles in many plays and musicals in Canada, most notably as Mary in The Secret Garden (Young People's Theatre, 2001) in Toronto, Anne in Anne of Green Gables (2005) and Polly Peachum in The Beggar's Opera (2006), Eponine in Les Misérables and Kitty in The Drowsy Chaperone at the Thousand Islands Playhouse. She appeared as a group member in Season 4, Episode 7 of Piper Perabo's television series Covert Affairs.

== Personal life ==
In 2019, Gilmour-Darling started the company, Theatrical Choir with Adrian Marchuk of Jersey Boys at the Windermere United Church in Toronto, Canada.
