= Dexter Janke =

Canadian gridiron football player and coach (born 1992)

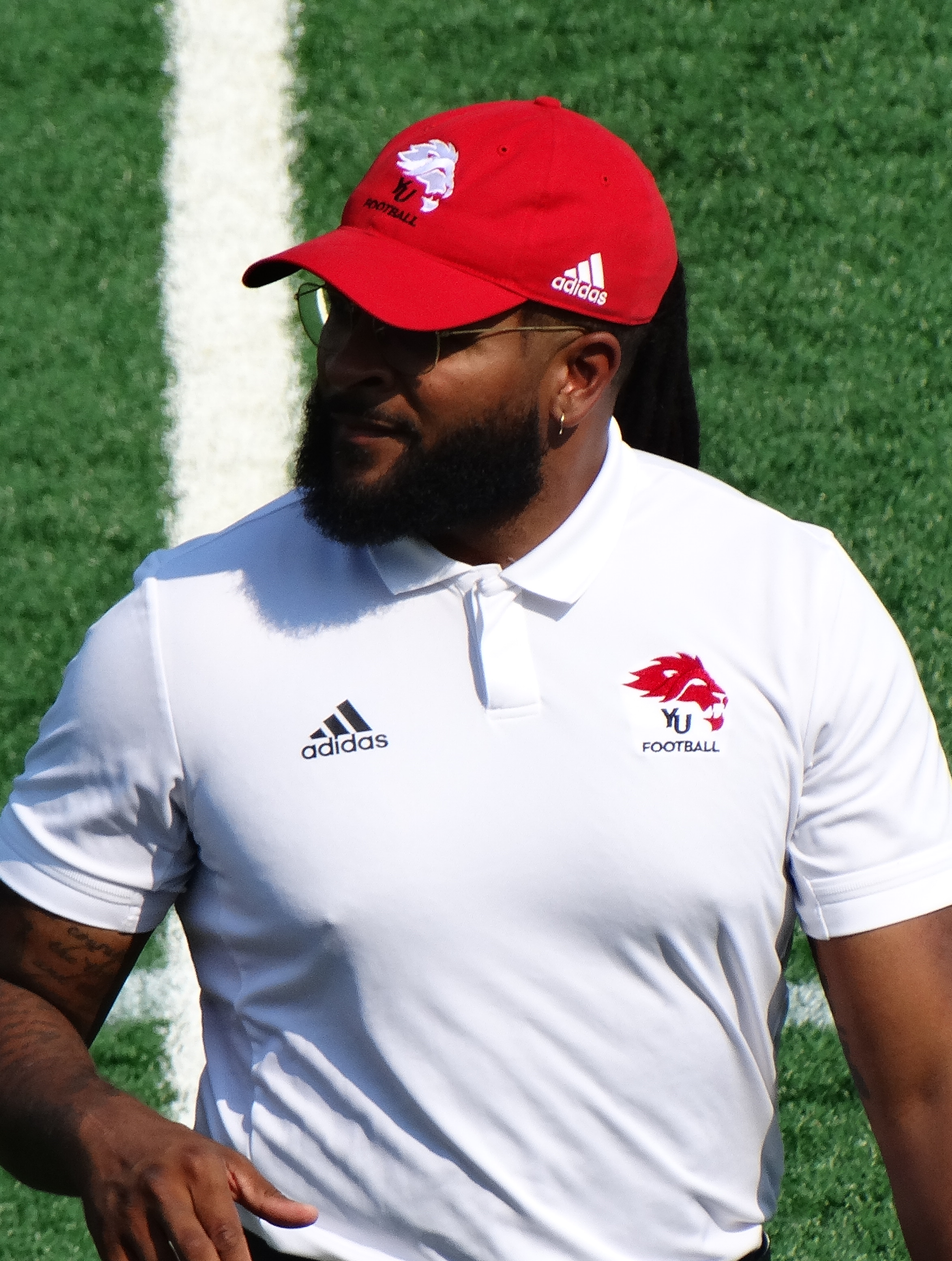
- Janke with the York Lions in 2024

York Lions
- Title: Head coach

Personal information
- Born: October 4, 1992 (age 34); Edmonton, Alberta, Canada
- Listed height: 6 ft 0 in (1.83 m)
- Listed weight: 220 lb (100 kg)

Career information
- Position: Linebacker (No. 40, 31)
- High school: Austin O'Brien (Edmonton)
- CJFL: Okanagan Sun
- University: Saskatchewan
- CFL draft: 2015: 5th round, 44th overall pick

Career history

Playing
- 2015–2017: Calgary Stampeders
- 2019: Winnipeg Blue Bombers

Coaching
- 2021–2022: Westshore Rebels (Defensive coordinator Special teams coordinator)
- 2023: Westshore Rebels (Head coach)
- 2024–present: York Lions (Head coach)

Operations
- 2023: Westshore Rebels (Assistant general manager)

Awards and highlights
- Grey Cup champion (2019)
- Stats at CFL.ca

Dexter Janke (born October 4, 1992) is the head coach for the York Lions of U Sports football. He played professionally as a defensive back for four years in the Canadian Football League (CFL) with the Calgary Stampeders and Winnipeg Blue Bombers, the latter of which he won a Grey Cup title with in 2019. He has also served as head coach for the Westshore Rebels of the Canadian Junior Football League (CJFL).

He previously played amateur football for the Okanagan Sun and attended the University of Saskatchewan, where he played for the Saskatchewan Huskies as a running back.

== Early career ==
Janke played high school football at Austin O'Brien Catholic High School for three years as a running back. As a junior, he suffered a torn ACL. Janke made it to the city championships in his final year with the team, but he again tore his ACL in the championship game. He received an offer from the University of Calgary to play college football for the Calgary Dinos as both a running back and defensive back, but elected to play solely as a running back for the Saskatchewan Huskies instead. As a result of his second ACL injury, Janke sat out the 2010 season as a redshirt. In 2011, he rushed for 307 yards and four touchdowns, but Janke was sidelined again the following year with a third ACL injury to the same knee. His third reconstructive knee surgery was successful, and he returned to the Huskies in 2013. In 2013, his final year with the Huskies, Janke rushed for 423 yards and four touchdowns.

Janke left the Huskies and joined the Okanagan Sun of the Canadian Junior Football League in 2014. While switching teams, he also switched to the defensive back position. In his only season with Okanagan, Janke recorded 14 tackles, three interceptions, and a fumble recovery while playing in eight games. He also played as a kick and punt returner, averaging 32.9 yards per kick return and 8.3 yards per punt return.

== Professional career ==
=== Calgary Stampeders ===
At the regional CFL Combine in Edmonton, Janke had the second-fastest 40-yard dash time at 4.57 seconds. He earned an invitation to the national combine in Toronto, where he recorded the fastest shuttle time among defensive backs at 4.25 seconds. Janke was selected in the fifth round of the 2015 CFL draft by the Calgary Stampeders with the 44th overall pick. After beginning the season on the practice squad, Janke made his CFL debut on July 24, 2015, against the Ottawa Redblacks, where he played primarily on special teams. In the August 1 game against the Montreal Alouettes, he recorded his first tackle, finishing with two special-teams tackles. He was released by the Stampeders on May 4, 2018.

=== Winnipeg Blue Bombers ===
On February 7, 2019, Janke signed with the Winnipeg Blue Bombers. He played in three games in 2019 where he recorded two special teams tackles. Janke was on the 6-game injured list when the Blue Bombers won the 107th Grey Cup. He was later released on January 30, 2020.

== Coaching career ==
=== Westshore Rebels ===
On March 9, 2020, it was announced that Janke had been hired as the defensive and special teams coordinator for the Westshore Rebels of the CJFL. While the 2020 season was cancelled, he coached for the team in 2021 upon their return to play. On November 6, 2022, Janke was promoted to head coach and assistant general manager for the Rebels. He led the team to an undefeated 12–0 conference record in 2023 and won the BC Cullen Cup.

=== York Lions ===
On January 22, 2024, Janke was announced as the head coach for the York Lions football team, the 12th head coach in program history.
