= Joan Hollobon =

Canadian writer and journalist (1920–2024)

- Born: January 29, 1920; Isle of Wight, England
- Died: April 3, 2024 (aged 104); Toronto, Ontario, Canada
- Occupation: Journalist
- Years active: 1952–1985
- Awards: Order of Canada

Joan May Hollobon OC, (January 29, 1920 – April 3, 2024) was an English-born Canadian writer and journalist best known for her progressive medical reporting for Globe and Mail. She was made an Officer of the Order of Canada (2019) in recognition of her impact on the relationship between medical professionals and the media.

== Early life and education ==
Joan May Hollobon was born on the Isle of Wight on January 29, 1920. An only child, she grew up near and attended school in Rhyl, Wales. During World War II, Hollobon volunteered as an administrative and press officer with the British Red Cross. In 1946, she moved to Berlin where she worked as a British secretary for the Allied Control Commission.

Hollobon first travelled to Canada in 1949 on a visitor's visa but had trouble finding stable employment. She left for England, where she worked for Reader's Digest writing letters. Returning to Canada in 1951, Hollobon moved to Kirkland Lake, Ontario where she landed a job with the Kirkland Lake Northern News.

== Career ==
Hollobon worked for the Kirkland Lake Northern News from 1952 to 1953. She worked as women's editor before becoming a general reporter, covering news related to the mining industry. From 1954 to 1956 she wrote for the North Bay Nugget . Judge J.A.S. Plouffe recognized Hollobon's "just and accurate reporting" of police commission meetings at a send off from the newspaper, ahead of her departure for a position at The Globe and Mail.

After joining The Globe and Mail in 1956, Hollobon worked as a general assignment reporter. One of her early pieces covered remarks made by Jewish labour activist Kalmen Kaplansky at the Ontario Federation's of Labor's Human Rights Conference in December of that year regarding employment discrimination based on religion. In 1959, she took over medical reporting for the newspaper. The role had previously been held by David Spurgeon.

Hollobon began reporting on medical issues at a time when medical professionals wanted little to do with journalists. She told reporter Paula Arab that "[i]n those days, Canadian scientists and doctors considered it virtually unethical to talk to the press at all." In 1962, Hollobon covered the Saskatchewan doctors' strike during which physicians vowed to close their practices if Medicare became law. Her series on the events was later reprinted by The Globe and Mail as a booklet titled “Bungle, Truce and Trouble”. In the 1970s Hollobon was among the fist to report on transgender people and their experience pursuing sex reassignment surgery, at the time reported as sex-change operations.

Beyond her writing for The Globe and Mail, Hollobon helped found the Canadian Science Writers' Association in 1971. She joined the Toronto branch of the Canadian Women's Press Club in 1968 and served for a time as treasurer. Hollobon was also once a contributing editor for the Journal of Addiction Research Foundation of Ontario.

== Retirement and death ==
Hollobon retired from The Globe and Mail in 1985. She died in Toronto on April 3, 2024, at the age of 104.

== Honours ==
On her retirement in 1985, the Canadian Medical Association awarded her its Medal of Honour as "one of medicine's greatest allies". In 1990 Hollobon, along with Toronto Star reporter Marilyn Dunlop, was awarded the Royal Canadian Institute for Science's Sandford Fleming Award for excellence in science communication. Hollobon was named an Officer of the Order of Canada on December 28, 2019. The citation for the honor noted that she "influenced how physicians interact with their patients and the public on a daily basis." In 2022 the National Newspaper Awards's Beat Reporting award was named after Joan Hollobon for establishing "what beat reporting should be".

== Publications ==
- Hollobon, Joan (1987). The lion's tale : a history of the Wellesley Hospital, 1912-1987. Toronto: Irwin. ISBN 0772512205.
