= Chirp (magazine) =

Canadian children's magazine

- Categories: Children's magazine, Science
- Frequency: 10/year
- Publisher: Owlkids
- Total circulation: 53,921 (2017)
- Founded: 1997; 29 years ago
- Company: Bayard Canada
- Country: Canada
- Based in: Toronto
- Language: English
- Website: www.owlkids.com/magazines/chirp/
- ISSN: 1206-4580

Chirp Magazine is a popular Canadian children's and science magazine founded in 1997 as a comic book. Aimed at young children, it is published 10 times per year.

Chirp is the youngest member in a family of magazines that includes OWL and Chickadee. Regular features include crafts, jokes, puzzles, fiction, and the comics "The Vole Brothers" and "Chirp and Friends," which features the adventures of the magazine's namesake, a large yellow bird.

Chirp, like OWL and Chickadee, is published by Owlkids and owned by Bayard Canada. Bayard also owns a number of French children's publications, including Les Débrouillards and Les Explorateurs.

== Television ==
In January 2012, Toronto-based animation studio Yowza announced that it was collaborating with Owlkids and the Canadian Broadcasting Corporation to develop a preschool television series based on the magazine. The show airs on CBC Kids.
