= Gordon Penrose =

Canadian scientist, educator and author

- Born: July 24, 1925
- Died: December 16, 1997 (aged 72)
- Occupation: York Borough master science teacher
- Awards: Fellow of the Ontario Institute for Studies in Education

Gordon William Gavin Penrose CM (July 24, 1925 – December 16, 1997), nicknamed the Zany Dr. Zed, was a Canadian scientist, educator, and author of children's science books. His works have been featured in OWL magazine and ChickaDEE magazine, and he played the role of Dr. Zed for the children's television show OWL/TV.

Penrose's philosophy was based on interactive science experiments on the belief that children learn best by doing. Consequently, his books describe experiments that require as little adult supervision as possible. Penrose's audience is eight- to twelve-year-olds, who are in Piaget's "concrete operations" stage, where abstract thinking about hypotheticals is not yet fully developed.

He died on December 16, 1997, at the age of 72.

== Bibliography ==
- Dr. Zed's Brilliant Book of Science Experiments (juvenile), illustrations by Linda Bucholtz-Ross, Greey de Pencier Publications, 1977.
- Dr. Zed's Zany Brilliant Book of Science Experiments, 1978.
- Dr. Zed's Dazzling Book of Science Activities (juvenile), Greey de Pencier Publications, 1982.
- Magic Mud and Other Great Experiments (juvenile), illustrations by Tina Holdcroft, Greey de Pencier Publications, 1987.
- Dr. Zed's Science Surprises (juvenile), Simon & Schuster (New York), 1989.
- Sensational Science Activities with Dr. Zed (juvenile), Simon & Schuster (New York), 1990.
- More Science Surprises from Dr. Zed (juvenile), Simon & Schuster (New York), 1992.
- Science Fun: Hands-on Science with Dr. Zed, 1998.
