= Fred Bruemmer =

Latvian Canadian artist (1929-2013)

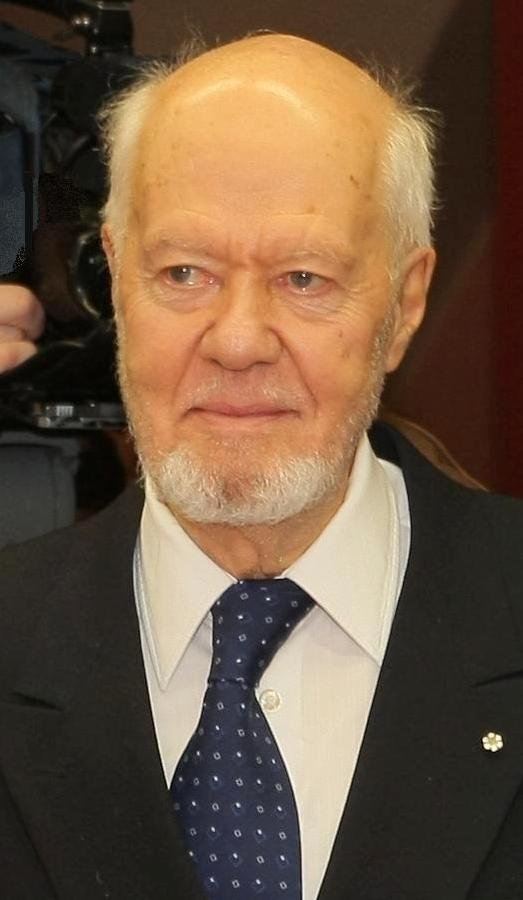
- Born: Friedrich Karl von Brümmer; 26 June 1929; Riga, Latvia
- Died: 17 December 2013 (aged 84)
- Occupation: Nature photographer

Fred Bruemmer, CM RCA D.Litt. (Latvian: Freds Brimmers; 26 June 1929 – 17 December 2013) was a Latvian Canadian nature photographer and researcher. He spent his life travelling extensively throughout the circumpolar regions and to other remote parts of the globe. His works have been centered mostly on the Arctic, its people and its animals. He also conducted research and published on animals in many other areas of the globe. He spoke nine languages and wrote more than a thousand articles for publications around the world, including Canadian Geographic, Natural History, National Geographic and Smithsonian. Fred Bruemmer lived in Montreal, Quebec.

Born Friedrich Karl von Brümmer (Latvian: Frīdrihs Kārlis fon Brimmers) in Riga, Latvia, to a Baltic-German family, he emigrated to Canada in 1951 and became a citizen in 1956. His book Survival - A Refugee Life, published in 2005, talks about the harrowing ordeals the young Bruemmer went through during World War II, which led him from his Latvian birthplace to eventual immigration to Canada.

His 1964 photo of a white harp seal pup became an icon and was among 51 photos chosen in the book Photographs that Changed the World.

Books by Fred Bruemmer include:

- The Long Hunt (1969);
- Seasons of the Eskimo (1971);
- Encounters with Arctic Animals (1972);
- The Arctic (1974);
- The Life of the Harp Seal (1977);
- Children of the North (1979);
- Summer at Bear River (1980);
- The Arctic World (1985);
- Arctic Animals (1986);
- Seasons of the Seal (1988);
- World of the Polar Bear (1989);
- Seals (1991) (with Eric S. Grace);
- Land of Dark, Land of Light (1993) (with Karen Pandell);
- Les Animaux du Grand Nord (1993) (with Angele Delaunois);
- Arctic Memories: Living with the Inuit (1993);
- Nanook and Nauja: The Polar Bear Cubs (1995) (with Angele Delaunois);
- Kotik: The Baby Seal (1995) (with Angele Delaunois);
- Polar Dance: Born of the North Wind (1997) (with Tom Mangelsen);
- Seals in the Wild (1998)
- Glimpses of Paradise: The Marvel of Massed Animals (2002), ISBN 978-1552976661
- Survival - A Refugee Life (2005)
- Islands of Fate (2006)
- Arctic Visions: Pictures from a Vanished world (2009)

== Honours ==
- Member of the Order of Canada, 1983;
- Recipient of the Queen Elizabeth II Silver Jubilee medal, 1993;
- Fellow of the Arctic Institute of North America;
- Member of the Travel Journalist Guild;
- North American Nature Photography Association Lifetime Award, 2003;
- Royal Canadian Institute Sanford Fleming medal, 1989;
- Honorary Doctoral Degree, Dr.h.c. University of New Brunswick, 1989.
- Royal Canadian Academy of Arts
