= JP Houston =

American singer

JP Houston is a Canada-born American singer-songwriter, producer, storyteller, and host.

== Career ==
Houston has a large catalogue of songs composed for television, theater, film and record. One of his first credits, while still in high school, was composing the theme song to the PBS/YTV children's series The Big Comfy Couch. With hundreds of credits, he was nominated for a Gemini Award (Canadian Emmy) in 2001. His work has appeared on The Rosie O'Donnell Show, Funny or Die Presents, and countless other national and international productions. A song co-written by Houston was featured in the Macy's Thanksgiving Day Parade. He has written for PBS, BBC, HBO, CBC, and many others.

Houston has toured and recorded all over North America and Europe. He was a member of Brian Bell's Weezer side project The Relationship Houston did a two-year stint leading the house band at Pappy & Harriet's in Pioneertown, California. He has shared the stage with artists including Leon Russell, Kyuss, Victoria Williams, Band Of Horses, M Ward, Tim Easton, and a host of other notable acts.

In 2013, Houston began his weekly syndicated NPR variety show American Parlor Songbook. The program originates from its home station of KVCR (FM) NPR in Southern California, with rebroadcasts on stations around the country. The show features Houston's original songs and stories every episode.
