= Sandford Fleming Medal =

Science communication award

The Sandford Fleming Medal was instituted in 1982 by the Royal Canadian Institute for Science (RCIScience). It consists of the Sandford Fleming Medal with Citation. It is named in honour of Sandford Fleming and awarded annually "to an individual working in Canada who has made outstanding contributions to science communication."

== Awardees ==
The full list of awardees is on the RCIScience web site.

- 1982: David Suzuki
- 1983: Lydia Dotto
- 1984: Lister Sinclair
- 1985: Helen Sawyer Hogg
- 1986: Jay Ingram
- 1987: J. Tuzo Wilson
- 1988: Fernand Seguin
- 1989: Fred Bruemmer
- 1990: Joan Hollobon and Marilyn Dunlop
- 1991: Annabel Slaight
- 1992: Terence Dickinson
- 1993: Carol Gold
- 1994: Edward Struzik
- 1995: Eve Savory
- 1996: Derek York
- 1997: John R. Percy
- 1998: Sid Katz
- 1999: John Charles Polanyi
- 2000: Ursula Martius Franklin
- 2001: Patterson Hume
- 2002: Bob McDonald
- 2003: Robert Buckman
- 2004: M. Brock Fenton
- 2005: Joe Schwartz
- 2006: Paul Fjeld
- 2007: Peter Calamai
- 2008: Henry Lickers
- 2009: David Schindler
- 2010: Paul Delaney
- 2011: John Dirks
- 2012: Robert Thirsk
- 2013: Chris Hadfield
- 2014: Penny Park
- 2015: Molly Shoichet
- 2016: Ivan Semeniuk
- 2018: John Smol
- 2019: Dan Falk
- 2020: Timothy Caulfield
- 2021: André Picard
- 2022: Dawn Bazely
- 2023: Terry Collins
- 2024: Alanna Mitchell
- 2025: Geoffrey Hinton

== See also ==
- List of general science and technology awards
