= Science Media Centre of Canada =

Science Media Centre of Canada Centre Canadien Science et Médias
- Abbreviation: SMCC/CCSM
- Formation: 2010
- Legal status: Non-profit organization
- Location: Virtual
- Region served: Canada
- Founding Director: Penny Park
- Website: www.sciencemediacentre.ca

The Science Media Centre of Canada (SMCC) is a non-profit organization that was formally opened on September 27, 2010. It has virtual offices.

The purpose of the Centre is to serve journalists with accurate information on scientific matters. The Centre has a Research Advisory Panel of 20 Canadian scientists who will make their expertise available in a simple and understandable manner. In order to secure objectivity, the Centre has a Editorial Advisory Committee of eight journalists. The Centre is bilingual.

== Goal ==
The ultimate goal of SMCC is an "increased public engagement with science issues through media coverage of science that is more informed, more accurate and more incisive."

== Other SMCs ==
Science Media Centres exist in other countries; UK, Australia, New Zealand, Germany and Japan. The Science Media Centre of Canada is independent with respect to the other centres.
