= Zed Saad =

Qatari footballer (born 1997)

Personal information
- Full name: Zed Saad Aboulos Ismaeel
- Date of birth: 24 May 1997 (age 29)
- Place of birth: Qatar
- Position: Midfielder

Team information
- Current team: Al-Waab
- Number: 10

Youth career
- –2019: Al-Arabi

Senior career*
Years	Team	Apps	(Gls)
2019–2020	Al-Arabi	0	(0)
2020–2021	Al-Wakrah	4	(0)
2021–2024	Al-Shamal	9	(0)
2025	Qatar	0	(0)
2025–	Al-Waab	1	(0)
- * Club domestic league appearances and goals

Zed Saad Aboulos (Arabic: زيد سعد أبو الروس; born 24 May 1997), is a Qatari professional footballer who plays for Al-Waab as a midfielder.

== Career statistics ==
=== Club ===
As of 1 October 2020.

Club	Season	League			Cup		Continental		Other		Total	
Club	Season	Division	Apps	Goals	Apps	Goals	Apps	Goals	Apps	Goals	Apps	Goals
Al-Arabi	2019–20	Qatar Stars League	0	0	5	0	—		—		5	0
Al-Arabi	Al-Arabi Total		0	0	5	0	0	0	0	0	5	0
Al-Wakrah	2020–21	Qatar Stars League	4	0	1	0	—		—		5	0
Career totals			4	0	6	0	0	0	0	0	10	0
