= Zonal Employee Discount =

Multilateral agreement for reduced rate personal travel by airline employees

Zonal Employee Discount (ZED) is a multilateral agreement for reduced rate personal travel by airline employees and other travelers. Airlines may bilaterally agree to apply one of three fare levels (Low, Medium, High), space-available / subload and / or positive space / firm reservation status, as well as eligibility for travel in the economy and / or business class cabins.

ZED is half of a larger organization known as the ZED/MIBA Forum. The Forum is made up of over 175 member airlines from all parts of the globe, participating in the ZED and/or the MIBA (Multilateral Interline Business Agreement) programs. ZED and MIBA conditions may be applied for travel on and by other airlines, as bilaterally agreed, or by the airline's own employees traveling on its own flights.

== Background ==
ZED was formed in 1994 by seven airlines:

- Aer Lingus
- Air Canada
- Austrian Airlines
- British Airways
- Lufthansa
- Malév Hungarian Airlines
- SAS Scandinavian Airlines System

Since its formation, the organization has grown to include approximately 180 airlines from all parts of the globe as well as over 70 affiliate airlines. ZED/MIBA Forum member airlines represent over 90 countries and 6 continents. The administration of the ZED program was merged with the MIBA program in 2001. These programs are governed by three separate agreements: ZED/MIBA Forum Agreement, ZED Agreement, and MIBA Agreement.

== Becoming a member ==
An airline is eligible to participate in ZED and/or MIBA if it:

- operates scheduled air passenger transportation services available for ZED/MIBA use
- is able to accept industry discount tickets in accordance with the terms of the agreement and the ZED and/or MIBA agreements
- is able to issue, and/or authorize another ZED/MIBA Forum member to issue on its behalf, industry discount ID tickets in accordance with the agreements
- is able to communicate via an official (corporate) email address
- publishes its scheduled air passenger transportation services and availability in a major GDS, e.g. Amadeus, Sabre, Worldspan, Gabriel, Galileo

If the airline meets all of the above criteria, it may submit an application to the ZED/MIBA Forum Member Service Center and pay all required fees for participation. Once accepted, an airline must also negotiate and implement its first bilateral concurrence with another ZED/MIBA Forum Member.

== See also ==
- Interlining
- Interline travel
