= Zee =

Zee is the phonetic pronunciation of the letter Z in American English ("zed" in Commonwealth English).

Zee may also refer to:

== People ==
- Zee (徐), a Wu Chinese surname, an equivalent of Xu
- Anthony Zee (b. 1945), Chinese-American physicist
- Chief Zee (born 1941-2016), American sports fan
- Ginger Zee (born 1981), American meteorologist
- Hope Jane Zee (born 1930), American actress better known as Hope Holiday
- Jen Zee, American video game artist
- Joe Zee (born 1968), American stylist
- Ona Zee (born 1951), American pornographic actress
- Phyllis Zee, professor
- Teddy Zee, American film producer
- Troi Zee, American actress
- Young Zee (born 1975), American hip hop emcee
- Zee Asadel (born 2004), Indonesian actress, singer, and dancer
- Zee Pruk Panich (born 1992), Thai actor

== Fictional characters ==
- Zee (The Matrix), a film character
- Zatanna, a DC Comics character, nicknamed "Zee"
- Zee / Codename: Brazil, a superhero in The Ambassadors and Big Game
- Zee D. Bird, a main character and the sidekick of Moose
- Zee, a character in True and the Rainbow Kingdom
- Zoya (YRF Spy Universe) nicknamed Zee, a character in Indian films of the YRF Spy Universe, portrayed by Katrina Kaif

== Other uses ==
- Zee Entertainment Enterprises, a multinational television company
  - Zee TV, an India-based satellite TV channel
  - Zee.One, the German sister channel of Zee TV
  - Zee Learn, India-based educational subsidiary
- Zee, a British band that released one album, Identity, in 1984
- Tappan Zee, natural widening of the Hudson River in New York state, from Dutch word zee meaning sea
  - Tappan Zee Bridge (1955–2017)
  - Tappan Zee Bridge (2017–present)
- Zee, a former brand of napkin made by Georgia-Pacific

== See also ==
- Z (disambiguation)
- Zed (disambiguation)
