= OWL/TV =

Canadian children's television series

Production
- Executive producer: Annabel Slaight
- Producer: Paulle Clark

Original release
- Release: November 5, 1985 – 1990

OWL/TV is a Canadian children's educational television series that aired on CBC, from 1985 to 1990, and then later on CTV, from 1990 to 1994. It focused on nature and science discovery, emphasizing to viewers how they can affect their own environment.

== Segments ==
Each half-hour program presented cartoon segments mixed with serious themes and contains segments from several recurring themes:

- Mighty Mites: Three kids who possess the magical ability to shrink in size in order to discover microscopic environments.
- Animals Close Up: Discovers other aspects of animal life. Kids meet the animals first-hand and see on-the-spot interviews with zoologists and experts on animal behaviour.
- Tomorrow Today: Looks at the future from a kid's point of view, brings kids into working laboratories.
- Real Kids features youths who are actively involved in trying to develop their environment. These are kids who are not afraid to try. Real Kids nurtures the idea that individuals of any age can make a difference.
- You and Your Body: Kids learn about themselves with the help of a wise and funny skeleton named Bonepart (voiced by Michael Lennick).
- Boneparte shares his energy for individual action on behalf of the environment.
- Dr. Zed discovers the connections between nature and science and shows kids exciting experiments.
- The Hoot Club Kids: Set up and work through a project, solving production/performance problems, experimenting with materials, interacting with their community and environment.

== Opening theme ==
This series' opening theme was performed by voice actress and musician Cree Summer Francks. The lyrics were written by Tim Ryan and music composed by Jonathan Goldsmith. The theme was updated in 1986.

== USA broadcasts ==
In the United States, PBS and Showtime aired the entirety of the series, with the U.S. distribution by WNET-TV. PBS aired the program from 1985 until 1991, when the program moved to Showtime for another seven years, lasting from 1991 until 1999. Reruns of the series have aired on YTV. A Quebecois French dub of the series also aired as Télé-Hibou on the youth-aimed channel Canal Famille (now Vrak). This series was based on OWL. Funding for the series was initially provided in part by PBS, with the National Audubon Society serving as a co-producer.

== British version ==
A British version was created in 1989 with Michaela Strachan as presenter. The series was made for CITV by Thames Television with repeats on Channel 4. When Thames lost its franchise Channel 4 picked up the rights in 1993 for one last series made by Tetra Films.

This version did use the same opening titles, but unlike the Canadian version, the British version was a straight wildlife programme with no animation segments and most editions were 20 minutes long. The North American segments were incorporated into the programme.

=== Broadcast guide ===
- Series 1: 5 January 1989 – 9 March 1989: 10 episodes for Thames Television.
- Series 2: 16 March 1990 – 25 May 1990: 10 episodes for Thames Television.
- Series 3: 3 January 1991 – 28 March 1991: 12 episodes for Thames Television.
- Series 4: 8 January 1992 – 11 March 1992: 10 episodes for Thames Television.
- Series 5: 31 July 1993 – 2 October 1993: 10 episodes for Tetra Films.
