= OWL (magazine) =

Canadian children's magazine

- November 2011 issue
- Frequency: 10/year
- Publisher: Owlkids
- Total circulation: 47,350 (2017)
- Founded: 1976; 50 years ago
- Company: Bayard Canada
- Country: Canada
- Based in: Toronto, Ontario
- Language: English
- Website: owlkids.com/collections/owl
- ISSN: 0382-6627

OWL Magazine is a Canadian children's magazine founded in 1976 by Young Naturalist Foundation members Annabel Slaight and Mary-Anne Brinkmann. It was designed to make children ages 8–12 “think beyond the printed page”.

Originally a science and nature magazine – OWL stands for “Outdoors and Wild Life” – in recent years, like sister publication Chickadee, the magazine has come to encompass a larger variety of topics.

Regular features include weird news from around the world, how-to articles, science stories, a reader-driven advice column, and comics The Spruce Street Squad and Max Finder Mystery. Memorable past features include Dr. Zed (written by Canadian scientist Gordon Penrose and is being continued in Chickadee) and comic strip The Mighty Mites, which left in 2002.

Related OWL media has included books and videos, produced by former owner OWL Communications. In 1997, OWL (as well as sister publications Chickadee and Chirp) was purchased by Bayard Canada, which also owns a number of French-language children's magazines, including Les Débrouillards and Les Explorateurs.

== OWL/TV ==
OWL/TV was a half-hour television show that aired from 1985 to 1994 and was based on the magazine. Like the magazine, it focused on science and nature. It aired on CBC, and then later on CTV.
