= Chickadee (magazine) =

Canadian children's magazine

- Categories: Children's magazine
- Frequency: Monthly
- Publisher: Owlkids
- Total circulation: 58,805 (2017)
- Founded: 1979; 47 years ago
- Company: Bayard Presse
- Country: Canada
- Based in: Toronto, Ontario
- Website: owlkids.com/magazine/chickadee/display=0
- ISSN: 0707-4611

Chickadee (formerly stylized as chickaDEE) is a Canadian monthly children's magazine. It was founded in 1979 as a spin-off of OWL Magazine geared towards younger readers. Its headquarters is in Toronto.

Originally, the magazine was aimed at kids up to the age of eight and focused on science and nature. Founding editor Janis Nostbakken created a mix of puzzles, activities, and stories, including recurring characters such as Henry the Pig and Daisy, the transforming heroine of the "Daisy Dreamer" comics.

Over time the magazine has become aimed toward children aged six to nine, and has gradually become a more general-purpose children's magazine.

The magazine was published by the Young Naturalist Foundation. In 1997, Chickadee (as well as sister publications OWL and Chirp) was purchased by Bayard Canada, which also owns a number of French-language children's magazines, including Les Débrouillards and Les Explorateurs.
