= Royal Canadian Institute =

Canadian nonprofit organization dedicated to the advancement of science

Royal Canadian Institute for Science
- Abbreviation: RCIScience
- Formation: June 20, 1849
- Type: Learned society
- Legal status: Nonprofit organization
- Purpose: Encouragement and general advancement of the physical sciences, the arts and the manufactures
- Headquarters: Toronto, Ontario, Canada
- Region served: Canada
- Official language: English, French
- Chair: Stephen Chait
- Website: www.rciscience.ca

The Royal Canadian Institute for Science (RCIScience), known also as the Royal Canadian Institute, is a Canadian nonprofit organization dedicated to connecting the public with Canadian science.

== History ==
The organization was formed in Toronto as the Canadian Institute on June 20, 1849, by Sandford Fleming, Kivas Tully, and Hamilton Hartley Killaly. It was conceived of originally as an organization for surveyors, civil engineers, and architects practising in and about Toronto, Ontario. It quickly became more general in its scientific interests.

A royal charter was granted on November 4, 1851, in which the objects of the organization are declared to be "the encouragement and general advancement of the physical sciences, the arts and the manufactures". It is now the oldest scientific society in Canada.

== Museum ==
Its first museum collection consisted mostly of archaeological and ethnographic items from native groups in Canada. Its first curator was David Boyle. During 1896, needing more room for the museum, the collection was transferred to the Toronto Normal School (The Museum of Natural History and Fine Arts or Ontario Provincial Museum); Boyle cared for it until his death during 1911. Its collection was later transferred to the Royal Ontario Museum.

== Journal ==
The Institute regularly published a journal, 'the Canadian Journal', by various titles 1852–1878, as Proceedings 1879–1890 and later Transactions 1890–1969. 'Early Days of the Canadian Institute' by Sandford Fleming was published during 1899. The Royal Canadian Institute Centennial Volume, published in 1949, summarizes one hundred years of science in Canada and the history of the Royal Canadian Institute, 1849–1949. Since 2018, RCIScience has published an annual magazine for the public, featuring interviews and articles with scientists across Canada.

== Activities ==
RCIScience first started hosting public lectures on the University of Toronto campus starting in 1913. Since then, RCIScience has expanded its activities to include in-person and online events, and novel initiatives such as Science is a Drag (winner of the Special Award for Inclusive Science Engagement at the 2022 Falling Walls Summit Science Breakthrough of the Year, Science Engagement category. In 2021, RCIScience received the NSERC Award for Science Promotion which honours individuals and groups who make an outstanding contribution to the promotion of science in Canada through activities encouraging popular interest in science or developing science abilities

== Awards ==
Every year since 1982, RCIScience has awarded the Sandford Fleming Award to a Canadian who has made major contributions to the public understanding of science. The Sir William Edmond Logan Award was created in 2015 as a companion to the Fleming Medal to recognize the contribution that an organization (rather than an individual) has made to increasing science culture in Canada through communication of science. It is presented to an organization operating in Canada that demonstrates continued passion, aptitude and expertise in science communication to the public.

== Leadership ==
Notable past presidents include John Charles Fields (1919–1925; founder of the Fields Medal), William Edmond Logan, Daniel Wilson, John Henry Lefroy, John Beverley Robinson, George William Allan, William Henry Draper, Oliver Mowat and Henry Holmes Croft.

- 1849 – Hon. H. H. Killaly
- 1850 – Charles Rankin
- 1850, 1851 – Sir William Edmund Logan
- 1852, 1853 – General Sir John Henry Lefroy
- 1853, 1854 – Hon. Sir John Beverly Robinson
- 1855 – Hon. George William Allan
- 1856, 1857 – Hon. William Henry Draper
- 1859, 1860 – Sir Daniel Wilson
- 1861 – Hon. Sir John Hawkins Hagarty
- 1862, 1863 – Rev. John McCaul
- 1864, 1865 – Hon. Sir Oliver Mowat
- 1866, 1867 – Henry Holmes Croft
- 1868, 1869 – Rev. William Hincks
- 1870, 1871, 1872, 1873, 1874, 1875 – Rev. Henry Scadding
- 1876, 1877 – James Loudon
- 1878, 1879, 1880 – Sir Daniel Wilson
- 1881 – John Langton
- 1882, 1883 – John Milne Buchan
- 1884, 1885 – William Hodgson Ellis
- 1886, 1887 – William Henry Vander Smissen
- 1888, 1889, 1890 – Charles Carpmeal
- 1891, 1892 – Arthur Harvey
- 1893, 1894 – Robert Ramsay Wright
- 1895, 1896, 1897 – Archibald Byron Macallum
- 1898, 1899 – Sir Byron Edmund Walker
- 1900, 1901 – James Bain
- 1902, 1903 – Arthur Philemon Coleman
- 1904, 1905 – George Kennedy
- 1906, 1907 – Sir Frederic Stupart
- 1908, 1909 – John Joseph Mackenzie
- 1910, 1911, 1912 – Joseph Burr Tyrrell
- 1913, 1914, 1915 – Frank Arnoldi
- 1916 – Sir George Cunningham McLennan
- 1917, 1918 – John Murray Clark
- 1919, 1920, 1921, 1922, 1923, 1924 – John Charles Fields
- 1925 – John James Richard Macleod
- 1926, 1927 – Arthur Hewitt
- 1928 – William Arthur Parks
- 1929 – Robert Boyd Thomson
- 1930 – Thomas Alexander Russell
- 1931 – Eli Franklin Burton
- 1932 – John Patterson
- 1933, 1934 – Sir Robert Alexander Falconer
- 1935, 1936, 1937 – Joseph Ellis Thomson
- 1938 – Arthur Roger Clute
- 1939 – John Richardson Dymond
- 1940 – Wills Maclachlan
- 1941 – Linnaeus Joslyn Rogerts
- 1942 – Thomas Forsyth McIlwraith
- 1943 – Otto Holden
- 1944 – Elwood S. Moore
- 1945 – Thomas Wardrope Eadie
- 1946 – Thomas Richardson Loudon
- 1946 – Cedric Franklin Publow
- 1947 – George Harvey Agnew
- 1948 – James Watson Bain
- 1949 – B. Ben Meen
- 1950 – Hon. Justice F. H. Barlow
- 1951 – John S. Dickson
- 1952 – D. Bruce Murray
- 1953 – G. H. W. Lucas
- 1954 – A. Murray Fallis
- 1955 – Kenneth C. Fisher
- 1956 – John Richardson Dymond
- 1957 – Gordon G. Cosens
- 1958 – Hon. George William Allan
- 1958 – L. E. Jaquith
- 1959 – Arthur E. Parks
- 1960 – D. L. Maclean
- 1961 – R. W. I. Urquhart
- 1962 – James H. Soper
- 1963 – Arthur S. Michell
- 1964 – Helen S. Hogg
- 1965 – James A. Dauphinee
- 1966 – A. Hiles Carter
- 1967 – Albert M. Fisher
- 1968 – I. Kenneth Sitzer
- 1969 – Leonard Butler
- 1970 – Colin S. Farmer
- 1971 – Loris S. Russell
- 1972 – G. Ross Lord
- 1973 – Ralph S. Mills
- 1974 – Donald R. Gunn
- 1975 – Elton Lent
- 1976 – Alfred S. Barnes
- 1977 – Gordon S. Macivor
- 1978 – C. Gordon Page
- 1979 – Albert M. Fisher
- 1980 – Gordon S. Macivor
- 1981 – Frank C. Hooper
- 1982 – George J. Luste
- 1983 – Alan R. Emery
- 1984 – Graham Mudge
- 1985 – John R. Percy
- 1986 – Margaret W. Thompson
- 1987 – John H. Sword
- 1988 – John H. McFadyen
- 1989 – Bernhard Cinader
- 1990 – Alan Bruce-Robertson
- 1991 – Conrad E. Heidenreich
- 1992 – William R. C. Prior
- 1993 – Robert F. Garrison
- 1994 – Betty I. Roots
- 1995 – Dina Gordon Malkin
- 1996 – Veronika Huta
- 1997 – George Vanderkuur
- 1998, 1999 – Allison Sekuler
- 2000, 2001 – Kenneth G. Davey
- 2002, 2003 – M. Jane Phillips
- 2004, 2005 – Peter A. Victor
- 2006, 2007 – Michael Smith
- 2008, 2009 – Roy Douglas Pearson
- 2010, 2011 – Bruce Gitelman
- 2012, 2013 – Ronald Pearlman
- 2014, 2015 – Helle Tosine
- 2016, 2017 – Peter Love

Title changes to Chairman

- 2018, 2019 – Reinhart Reithemeier
- 2020, 2021 – Suzanne MacDonald
- 2022 – Stephen Chait
- 2023, 2024, 2025, 2026–Present – Jock Fleming

== See also ==
- List of Canadian organizations with royal patronage
