= List of Canadian Broadcasting Corporation personalities =

This is a list of notable past and present personalities associated with the television and radio arms of the Canadian Broadcasting Corporation.

== A ==
- Roger Abbott, late member of Royal Canadian Air Farce
- Vik Adhopia, reporter covering affairs of Newfoundland and Labrador
- Kate Aitken, radio and television personality of the 1930s to 1950s
- Madeleine Allakariallak, former anchor of Igalaaq on CFYK-DT
- Andrew Allan, national head of CBC Radio Drama from 1943 to 1955
- Tom Allen, host of About Time on CBC Music, formerly Shift
- Barbara Amiel
- Aba Amuquandoh
- Steve Armitage, former CBC-Sports reporter and play-by-play announcer
- Peter Armstrong; former host of World Report on CBC Radio 1, foreign correspondent for CBC Television and CBC Newsworld; currently the economics reporter for CBC News
- Adrienne Arsenault, Chief Correspondent for CBC News, co-host of The National
- Marie-Louise Arsenault, arts journalist
- Michel C. Auger, former host of CBF-FM, Ici Radio-Canada Le 15-18. As of Fall 2015, host of Midi Info.
- Nahlah Ayed, host of Ideas, foreign correspondent

== B ==
- Randy Bachman, host of Randy Bachman's Vinyl Tap
- Brent Bambury, host of Go, Brave New Waves, Midday
- James Barber, hosted the cooking show called The Urban Peasant
- Andy Barrie, former host of Metro Morning
- Alex Barris
- Rosemary Barton, CBC News Network (former host of Power & Politics)
- Anita Bathe, anchor at CBUT
- David Bazay
- Marie-France Bazzo
- Claude Beauchamp
- Nadira Begg, CBC News: Northbeat
- Ralph Benmergui, host of Midday
- Avril Benoit, This Morning
- Pierre Berton
- Guy Bertrand
- Laila Biali
- Christine Birak, health and science journalist
- Jim Bittermann, Toronto-based reporter; now CNN senior correspondent.
- Arthur Black, host of Basic Black
- Ian Black, meteorologist with CBOT-DT
- Tim Blanks
- Keith Boag
- Denise Bombardier, hosted, among others, the shows Présent international, Le point, Noir sur blanc (1979–1983) and Trait-d'union (1987–1988)
- Roy Bonisteel, host of Man Alive
- Susan Bonner, The National reporter
- Harry Brown, host of As It Happens from 1968 to 1974
- Hilary Brown
- Ian Brown
- Jim Brown
- Laurie Brown
- Patrick Brown, reporter, long-time China correspondent of CBC News
- Rob Brown
- Robin Brown
- Maureen Brosnahan
- Gilles Brunet
- Kim Brunhuber
- Dianne Buckner
- Barbara Budd, As It Happens
- Stéphan Bureau participated in Telejeans as a teenager and later hosted Le Téléjournal/Le point (1998–2003).
- Stanley Burke
- Tony Burman

== C ==
- Spence Caldwell
- Bill Cameron, correspondent and anchor
- Earl Cameron, The National
- Cassie Campbell
- John Candy, Coming Up Rosie
- Pat Carrabré
- Juliette Cavazzi
- Rita Celli
- Henry Champ
- Andrew Chang, co-host of The National
- Christiane Charette
- Piya Chattopadhyay
- Wei Chen
- Don Cherry, Hockey Night in Canada
- Don Chevrier
- Ify Chiwetelu
- Lisa Christiansen
- Dinah Christie
- Natalie Chung
- Natalie Clancy
- John Clark Host Junior Magazine 1956–60
- Adrienne Clarkson, former Governor General of Canada hosted shows such as Take 30 and the fifth estate
- Robert Clothier
- Véronique Cloutier
- Rick Cluff
- David Cochrane, journalist
- Saroja Coelho
- Nathan Cohen, theatre reviewer and host of Fighting Words in the 1950s and 1960s
- Bob Cole, Hockey Night in Canada
- Leon Cole
- Eleanor Collins
- David Common
- Ernie Coombs, Mr. Dressup
- Jim Corcoran, À Propos
- Ward Cornell
- Kevin Courrier
- Arisa Cox
- Andrew Coyne
- Gavin Crawford, Because News, This Hour Has 22 Minutes (2002–2010)
- Mark Critch, This Hour Has 22 Minutes
- Neil Crone
- Kelly Crowe
- Bill Cunningham
- Sandy Cushin
- Chris Cuthbert, play-by-play sports announcer

== D ==
- Cynthia Dale
- Joyce Davidson
- Fred Davis, host of Front Page Challenge
- Stu Davis, hosted several CBC radio and television series in 1950s and 60s
- Garth Dawley
- Gill Deacon, former host of Here and Now, former host of The Gill Deacon Show
- Gerry Dee
- Rosanna Deerchild
- Norman DePoe
- Bernard Derome, Le Téléjournal
- Michel Désautels
- Travis Dhanraj
- Trevor Dineen
- Gordon Donaldson - covered space exploration
- Joan Donaldson - former journalist and producer of CBC Newsworld
- Terry Donnelly
- James Doohan, Star Trek's "Scotty", worked in both CBC radio and television in the 1940s and 50s
- Jeff Douglas - As it Happens
- Raina Douris
- Bruce Dowbiggin
- Peter Downie
- Antonio Michael Downing
- Bronwyn Drainie
- Dwight Drummond, CBC News at Six anchor in Toronto
- Jonathan Dube
- Mike Duffy, former reporter on CBC radio and The National.
- Nana aba Duncan, former host of Podcast Playlist
- Nancy Durham
- Simon Durivage
- Howard Dyck

== E ==
- Lorne Elliott, Madly Off in All Directions
- Michael Enright, former host of The Sunday Edition
- Margaret Evans, foreign correspondent, former Middle East bureau chief
- Mary Jo Eustace

== F ==
- Natasha Fatah
- Don Ferguson, Royal Canadian Air Farce
- Max Ferguson, radio and television announcer.
- Gillian Findlay
- Danny Finkleman
- Robert Fisher
- Martina Fitzgerald
- Darren Flutie, CFL colour commentator
- Ken Finkleman
- Mary Lou Finlay, former co-host of As It Happens, The Journal
- Joe Flaherty
- Harry Flemming, political commentator on CBHT's First Edition
- Dave Foley, writer and actor on The Kids in the Hall from 1989 to 1994, starred in the NBC sitcom Newsradio.
- Harry Forestell, journalist
- Craig Forrest - MLS match analyst, general soccer commentator.
- Phillip Forsyth - co-host, As It Happens
- Mark Forsythe
- Michael J. Fox, in The Magic Lie series, 1978
- Yuani Fragata
- Whit Fraser - reporter National Radio and TV News, Anchor Newsworld
- Greg Frers
- Elliotte Friedman
- Barbara Frum, host of As It Happens (1971–1981) and The Journal (1982–1992)
- Melissa Fung

== G ==
- Vicki Gabereau
- Céline Galipeau
- Danny Gallivan, Hockey Night in Canada play-by-play announcer
- Matt Galloway, host of The Current, former host of Metro Morning and Podcast Playlist
- Sue Gardner, executive director of the Wikimedia Foundation, was a producer for CBC Radio and the director of the CBC's online news operations.
- Richard Garneau
- Hana Gartner
- Lana Gay
- Mitsou Gélinas
- Anthony Germain
- Russ Germain
- Bruno Gerussi
- Jian Ghomeshi
- Bill Gillespie
- Kevin Gillis
- Clyde Gilmour, host of Gilmour's Albums (1956–1997)
- David Gilmour
- Chris Glover
- Dale Goldhawk
- Brian Goldman
- Jonathan Goldstein
- Bill Good, former anchor for CBUT's NewsCentre (1978–1989)
- Jurgen Gothe, host of CBC Radio 2, national classical music program DiscDrive from 1985 to 2008
- Joseph Goudie
- Luba Goy, Royal Canadian Air Farce
- Arvel Gray
- Elizabeth Gray
- Lorne Greene, CBC's chief radio announcer (1939–1942), covering much of World War II
- David Grierson
- Liz Grogan
- Bill Guest
- Peter Gzowski, prominent journalist and author, host of Morningside.

== H ==
- Benita Ha
- Geri Hall, This Hour Has 22 Minutes (2004–2011)
- David Halton
- Matthew Halton
- Marie-Lynn Hammond
- Raed Hammoud
- Ian Hanomansing, host on The National, Canada Now
- Adrian Harewood, CBC News at Six anchor in Ottawa
- Tom Harrington
- Don Harron, host of Morningside
- Ali Hassan
- Jane Hawtin
- Geraldine Heaney
- Chantal Hébert, political commentator on CBC, columnist for Toronto Star
- Larry Henderson
- Bill Hewitt, Hockey Night in Canada play-by-play broadcaster
- Foster Hewitt, Hockey Night in Canada play-by-play broadcaster/color commentator
- Heather Hiscox
- Dave Hodge, former host of Hockey Night in Canada
- Jessica Holmes, Royal Canadian Air Farce
- Bob Homme
- Chris Howden
- Jim Hughson, Hockey Night in Canada
- Ross Hull, CBC Toronto meteorologist
- Paul Hunter
- Tommy Hunter
- Tariq Hussain, CBC Radio 3
- Chris Hyndman, former co-host of Steven and Chris
- Mary Hynes

== I ==
- Jay Ingram, host of Quirks and Quarks (1979–1992)
- Brenda Irving, CBC Sports
- Mary Ito

== J ==
- Wolfman Jack
- Judith Jasmin started working for Radio-Canada in the late 1940s, co-hosted Carrefour with René Lévesque on Radio-Canada/Radio, hosted Reportage and Conférence de presse, she became the first woman named foreign correspondent for Radio-Canada at the UN (1966), and then in Washington, DC.
- Michaëlle Jean, Governor General of Canada Hosted the documentary series The Passionate Eye and Grands Reportages, and produced and hosted individual documentary films
- Stu Jeffries - Good Rockin' Tonight, Switchback
- Charles Jennings, journalist
- Peter Jennings, at age nine, hosted a kids' program called Peter's People on CBC Radio in Ottawa
- Erica Johnson
- Falen Johnson
- Molly Johnson
- Andy Jones
- Cathy Jones, This Hour Has 22 Minutes
- Colleen Jones
- Daryn Jones
- Khari Jones

== K ==
- Vassy Kapelos, host of Power & Politics
- Mark Kelley, journalist
- Fraser Kelly
- Betty Kennedy
- Paul Kennedy
- Tom Kennedy
- Peter Kent
- Susan Kent, This Hour Has 22 Minutes
- Florence Khoriaty
- Wab Kinew (8th Fire, The 204, Canada Reads)
- Bartley Kives
- Peter Knegt
- Nil Köksal, CBC Newsworld, As It Happens
- Leora Kornfeld (RealTime, RadioSonic)
- Ken Kostick

== L ==
- Amanda Lang
- Augusta La Paix
- Laurier LaPierre
- Kirk LaPointe
- Holly Larocque
- Karin Larsen
- Ricardo Larrivée, host of Ricardo on Radio-Canada
- Emmanuelle Latraverse
- Grant Lawrence, CBC Radio 3
- Roméo LeBlanc
- René Lecavalier, war correspondent (World War II), then hosted La Soirée du hockey from its beginning on Radio-Canada television on October 11, 1952 (Montreal Canadiens vs. Detroit Red Wings) until the 1970s
- Mark Lee, former CBC Sports reporter
- Sook-Yin Lee
- Terry Leibel
- René Lévesque - Worked as journalist for Radio-Canada from after World War II (during which he served as war correspondent for the US Army) to 1960, covering such events as the Korean War (1951–1953) and hosting Point de mire. He moved on becoming a prominent cabinet minister in Quebec's Jean Lesage Liberal Government (1960), and later Premier of Quebec (Parti Québécois, 1976).
- Eugene Levy
- Avi Lewis
- Dana Lewis
- Sharon Lewis
- Stephen Lewis
- Rex Loring, announcer
- Charles Burchill Lynch
- Laura Lynch

== M ==
- Ann-Marie MacDonald, Life and Times
- Irene MacDonald
- Neil Macdonald
- Rick MacInnes-Rae
- Linden MacIntyre
- Ron MacLean, host of Hockey Night in Canada
- Carole MacNeil
- Rita MacNeil, Rita and Friends
- Meredith MacNeill
- Sheila MacVicar, former CBS, CNN and ABC news reporter and now with Al Jazeera America
- Gloria Macarenko
- Bob Mackowycz
- Judy Maddren
- Alan Maitland, As It Happens (1974–1993)
- Shaun Majumder, comedian, This Hour Has 22 Minutes (2003–2017)
- Rebecca Makonnen
- Eric Malling
- Katie Malloch
- Greg Malone
- Harry Mannis
- Peter Mansbridge, former host of The National
- Rosa Marchitelli, host Go Public, guest host Marketplace
- Jeff Marek
- Andrea Martin
- Claire Martin
- Ginella Massa
- Terry Matte
- Alexis Mazurin
- Trent McClellan, comedian, This Hour Has 22 Minutes
- Duncan McCue
- Bruce McCulloch
- Bob McDonald, host of Quirks and Quarks (1992- )
- Kevin McDonald
- Marguerite McDonald
- Allan McFee
- David McGuffin
- Terence McKenna, correspondent for CBC News
- Bob McKeown
- Mark McKinney, writer and actor in The Kids in the Hall from 1989 to 1994.
- George McLean
- Stuart McLean, host of Vinyl Cafe
- Bernie McNamee
- Marnie McPhail
- Casey Mecija, host of The Doc Project
- Ann Medina
- Anne-Marie Mediwake, CBC News at Six anchor in Toronto
- Suhana Meharchand
- Rick Mercer, comedian, The Rick Mercer Report (2004–2018), This Hour Has 22 Minutes (1993–2001)
- Ruby Mercer
- Wendy Mesley
- Don Messer
- Lorne Michaels, The Hart and Lorne Terrific Hour (1970–1971)
- Terry Milewski
- Greg Millen
- Gord Miller
- Sean Millington
- Colin Mochrie
- Rick Moranis
- John Morgan
- Jordi Morgan
- Keith Morrison
- Barry Morse
- Terry David Mulligan
- Patrick Munro
- Rex Murphy
- Anne Murray, on Singalong Jubilee, in the 1960s

== N ==
- Pascale Nadeau
- Pierre Nadeau, journalist, television and radio presenter and producer having anchored Le Téléjournal and hosted Le Point and Enjeux
- Joyce Napier, correspondent later nominated Canadian Ambassador to the Holy Seat
- Knowlton Nash, prominent newsreader and host
- Rassi Nashalik, former anchor of Igalaaq on CFYK-DT
- Alan Neal
- Harry Neale
- Julie Nesrallah
- Don Newman
- Kevin Newman
- Sydney Newman
- Lori Nichol
- Craig Norris
- Habiba Nosheen, co-host, The Fifth Estate

== O ==
- Catherine O'Hara, Coming Up Rosie, as Myrna Wallbacker and Schitt's Creek as Moira Rose
- Kevin O'Leary - former member of Dragons' Den, former co-host of The Lang and O'Leary Exchange
- Terry O'Reilly, host of Under the Influence
- Scott Oake
- Carol Off, former co-host of As It Happens
- Peter Oldring
- Susan Ormiston
- Royal Orr

== P ==
- Steve Paikin
- Murray Parker
- Amanda Parris
- Tony Parsons
- Steve Patterson
- Francine Pelletier
- Fred Penner
- Lloyd Percival
- Jacquie Perrin, Weekend Anchor
- Holger Petersen
- Saša Petricic
- Anne Petrie
- Curt Petrovich
- Kathleen Petty
- Geoff Pevere
- Cameron Phillips
- Mark Phillips
- Gordon Pinsent
- Aarti Pole
- Ross Porter
- Tom Power
- Sue Prestedge
- Valerie Pringle
- Belle Puri

== R ==
- Tim Ralfe - interviewer for CBC of Pierre Trudeau when he spoke the famous line, "Just watch me."
- Sean Rameswaram, host of Podcast Playlist
- Greg Rasmussen
- Vic Rauter
- Judy Rebick
- Drew Remenda
- Bill Richardson
- Daniel Richler
- Erika Ritter
- Jo-Ann Roberts
- John Robertson
- Lloyd Robertson - hosted CBC Weekend in 1969 and anchored CBC'sThe National from 1970 to 1976; presently CTV cohost of W5.
- Carla Robinson
- Ken Rockburn
- Bruce Rogers
- Fred Rogers' Mister Rogers show (CBC, 1962) show became Mister Rogers' Neighborhood on NET (later PBS) in 1968.
- Shelagh Rogers, host of The Next Chapter
- William Ronald
- Carlo Rota, Great Canadian Food Show
- Ioanna Roumeliotis
- Terry Rusling, radio engineer, electronic composer
- Lynne Russell, American born former CNN and CBC Newsworld anchor
- Scott Russell

== S ==
- Steven Sabados, Steven and Chris
- Andrew Sabiston
- Ray St. Germain
- Bernard St-Laurent
- Percy Saltzman, weatherman, was the first person to have appeared on CBLT CBC Television in 1952.
- Jeanne Sauvé - The late Governor General of Canada was a freelance journalist for CBC Radio starting in 1952
- Lorne Saxberg, original CBC Newsworld anchor
- Talia Schlanger
- Joe Schlesinger
- Patti Schmidt, Brave New Waves
- Dave Seglins, The World This Weekend
- Tommy Sexton
- Shad
- William Shatner
- Andy Sheppard
- Tetsuro Shigematsu, The Roundup
- Martin Short, Peep Show guest in "Goldberg is Waiting" episode
- René Simard
- Katie Simpson
- Gordon Sinclair
- Lister Sinclair, Ideas
- Stephen Smart
- Alison Smith
- Brian Smyth
- Paul Soles
- Shelley Solmes
- Evan Solomon, CBC News: Sunday Night
- Eric Sorensen
- Tina Srebotnjak
- Brian Stewart
- Janet Stewart
- Cy Strange, host of As It Happens and Fresh Air for many decades
- George Stroumboulopoulos, CBC News: The Hour
- Jack Sullivan, head of research for the 1976 Summer Olympics
- Patty Sullivan Kids' CBC
- Donald Sutherland started at age 14 with CBC Radio in Halifax, Nova Scotia
- David Suzuki
- Diana Swain
- Kevin Sylvester
- Alexandra Szacka

== T ==
- Tim Tamashiro
- Jimmy Tapp
- Carole Taylor
- Maureen Taylor
- Jowi Taylor
- Jan Tennant was the first woman to host The National when she appeared as a substitute newsreader
- Rich Terfry, also known as the rapper Buck 65 hosts Radio 2 Drive
- Angeline Tetteh-Wayoe
- Dave Thomas
- Greg Thomey
- Rosemary Thompson
- Scott Thompson writer and actor in The Kids in the Hall from 1989 to 1994.
- Shawn Thompson
- Pauline Thornhill
- Peter Togni, hosted That Time of the Night, Stereo Morning, Weekender, and Choral Concert on CBC Radio 2.
- Asha Tomlinson
- Ziya Tong
- Jonathan Torrens, hosted Jonovision and former host of Street Cents
- Alex Trebek, Reach for the Top co-host, Strategy host, 1969
- Anna Maria Tremonti
- Peter Trueman
- Sheldon Turcott

== U ==
- Robyn Urback (born 1988), journalist and political commentator

== V ==
- Julie Van Dusen
- Adam Vaughan
- John Vernon
- Nerene Virgin

== WXYZ ==
- Eleanor Wachtel, Writers and Company
- Connie Walker
- Claire Wallace, host of They Tell Me from 1942 to 1952, first woman broadcaster to learn how to fly a plane
- Pamela Wallin - Worked as a producer on CBC Radio. Her first TV work was on CTV's Canada AM. She later appeared on CBC TV, as cohost of Prime Time News and later host of Pamela Wallin Live.
- Mary Walsh, writer, director, comedian, This Hour Has 22 Minutes (1993–2013)
- John Warren
- Morgan Waters
- Patrick Watson
- Al Waxman
- Wayne and Shuster
- Jack Webster, panelist on Front Page Challenge
- Brian Williams, CBC Sports
- Nancy Wilson, CBC Newsworld
- Paul Winn
- David Wisdom
- Don Wittman, CBC Sports
- Nancy Wood
- Paul Workman
- Stephen Yan
- Marcia Young
- Andrew Younghusband
- Nora Young
- Moses Znaimer
- Richard Zussman
