= CBC News =

Division of the Canadian Broadcasting Corporation

- Logo used since 2018
- Type: Department of the CBC
- Industry: Media
- Founded: January 1, 1941
- Headquarters: Canada
- Area served: Specific services for Canada and rest of world
- Key people: Brodie Fenlon, general manager and editor in chief, CBC News
- Services: Radio and television broadcasts
- Owner: CBC
- Website: cbc.ca/news

CBC News is the division of the Canadian Broadcasting Corporation responsible for the news gathering and production of news programs on the corporation's English-language operations, including CBC Television, CBC Radio, CBC News Network, and CBC.ca. Founded in 1941 by the public broadcaster, CBC News is the largest news broadcaster in Canada and has local, regional, and national broadcasts and stations. It frequently collaborates with its organizationally separate French-language counterpart, Radio-Canada Info.

== History ==
The first CBC newscast was a bilingual radio report on November 2, 1936. The CBC News Service was inaugurated during World War II on January 1, 1941, when Dan McArthur, chief news editor, had Wells Ritchie prepare for the announcer Charles Jennings a national report at 8:00 pm. Previously, CBC relied on The Canadian Press to provide it with wire copy for its news bulletins. Readers who followed Jennings were Lorne Greene, Frank Herbert and Earl Cameron. CBC News Roundup (French counterpart: La revue de l'actualité) started on August 16, 1943, at 7:45 pm, being replaced by The World at Six on October 31, 1966.

On English-language television the first newscast, part of CBC Newsmagazine, was given on September 8, 1952, on CBLT (Toronto), the only English station then telecasting. Later that year CBC National News was introduced (anchors: Larry Henderson, Earl Cameron, Stanley Burke), then changing its name to The National in 1970. In 1989, the CBC launched its cable television news network, CBC Newsworld, now known as CBC News Network.

The CBC began delivering news online in 1996 via the Newsworld Online website. The CBC News Online site launched in 1998. In 2017, CBC News relaunched its flagship newscast, The National, with four co-anchors based in Toronto, Ottawa and Vancouver and later two anchors Monday through Thursday and a single anchor on Friday and Sunday.

== News output ==
CBC News logo as seen in 2019

In November 2023, the CBC joined with the International Consortium of Investigative Journalists, Paper Trail Media and 69 media partners including Distributed Denial of Secrets and the Organized Crime and Corruption Reporting Project (OCCRP) and more than 270 journalists in 55 countries and territories to produce the 'Cyprus Confidential' report on the financial network which supports the regime of Vladimir Putin, mostly with connections to Cyprus, and showed Cyprus to have strong links with high-up figures in the Kremlin, some of whom have been sanctioned. Government officials including Cyprus president Nikos Christodoulides and European lawmakers began responding to the investigation's findings in less than 24 hours, calling for reforms and launching probes.

=== Television ===
The Television News section of CBC News is responsible for the news programs on CBC Television and CBC News Network, including national news programs like The National, Marketplace, The Fifth Estate, and The Investigators with Diana Swain. It is also responsible for The Weekly with Wendy Mesley until its cancellation in September 2020. They are also responsible for news, business, weather and sports information for Air Canada's inflight entertainment.

==== Local ====
Most local newscasts on CBC Television are branded as CBC News: [city/province name], such as CBC News: Toronto at Six. Local radio newscasts are heard on the half-hour during morning and afternoon drive shows and on the hour at other times during the day.

=== Radio ===
The Radio News section of CBC News produces on-the-hour updates for the CBC's national radio newscasts and provides content for regional updates. Major radio programs include World Report, The World at Six, The World This Hour and The World this Weekend. The majority of news and information is aired on CBC Radio One. All newscasts are available on demand online, via apps or via voice-activated virtual assistants.

=== Online ===
CBC News Online is the CBC's CBC.ca news website. Launched in 1996, it was named one of the most popular news websites in Canada in 2012. The website provides regional, national, and international news coverage, and investigative, politics, business, arts and entertainment, Indigenous, health, science and tech news. An Opinion section was reintroduced in November 2016. Many reports are accompanied by podcasting, audio and video from the CBC's television and radio news services. CBC News content is available on multiple platforms, including Facebook, Twitter and Instagram.

In November 2022, the CBC launched CBC News Explore, a free ad-supported streaming television service. In addition to existing CBC news and information programming, new original programming on the service includes About That, a daily news and interview show hosted by Andrew Chang; Planet Wonder, an environmental news series hosted by Johanna Wagstaffe; Big, a documentary series about industry; and This Week in Canada, which highlights local news stories from the CBC's local news bureaux in various cities.

=== Network ===
CBC News Network (formerly CBC Newsworld) is an English-language news channel owned and operated by the CBC. It began broadcasting on July 31, 1989, from several regional studios in Halifax, Toronto, Winnipeg and Calgary. It was revamped and relaunched as the CBC News Network in 2009 as part of a larger renewal of the CBC News division. Current programs include CBC News Now (based in Toronto with Heather Hiscox, Suhana Meharchand, Carole MacNeil, John Northcott, Andrew Nichols (weekdays) and Aarti Pole and Michael Serapio (weekends), Power & Politics (based in Ottawa with host David Cochrane), and The National (with Adrienne Arsenault (Toronto), Ian Hanomansing (Vancouver) and Rosemary Barton hosting the weekly At Issue panel (Ottawa)). The network dropped the four-anchor format on January 22, 2020, and had Arsenault and Chang co-anchor from Monday through Thursday, with Hanomansing as solo anchor for the Friday and Sunday editions. Barton became the chief political correspondent for CBC News; she continues to host The National's weekly "At Issue" political panel along with her own politics-based program, Rosemary Barton Live, which airs on Sundays. In early 2023, CBC dropped the co-anchor format in favour of a single anchor everyday. Adrienne Arsenault continues to host the show Monday through Thursday, with Hanomansing hosting on Friday and Sunday.

=== Weather centre ===
In November 2005, the CBC News Weather Centre was established to cover local and international weather, using in part data provided by Environment Canada. Claire Martin was hired to serve as the primary face of the Weather Centre.

In April 2014, the national weather centre was effectively disbanded due to CBC budget cuts (Martin had left the CBC a few months prior). Weather presenters at local CBC stations were retained but with the added responsibility of supplying reports for The National and CBC News Network.

In November 2014, citing difficulties implementing this new system, the CBC announced a one-year trial content sharing partnership with The Weather Network, the privately owned cable specialty channel, which went into effect on December 8. Under the partnership, in exchange for access to weather-related news coverage from the CBC, The Weather Network provides the national weather reports seen on The National and CBCNN daytime programming, as well as local forecasts for CBC Toronto's weekend newscasts. Apart from Toronto, weather coverage during local newscasts was not affected, and CBC Vancouver meteorologist Johanna Wagstaffe continues to provide weather coverage for the Vancouver-based (primetime) editions of CBC News Now on CBC News Network.

Most local CBC stations have retained their weather team to provide local weather information, including:

- Johanna Wagstaffe – CBC Vancouver meteorologist
- John Sauder – CBC Manitoba meteorologist
- Jay Scotland – CBC PEI meteorologist
- Karen Johnson – CBC Toronto and Windsor weather specialist
- Catherine Verdon-Diamond – CBC Montreal weather specialist
- Tanara McLean – CBC Edmonton/Calgary weather specialist

The content partnership with the Weather Network has continued beyond the original one-year period; the partnership has also been expanded. The weather section of CBC.ca has been phased out in favour of forecasts from The Weather Network; further, local CBC news headlines are displayed on the latter's website.

== Programming ==
=== Television ===
CBC News provides the following television programs.

Current programs:

- The National, flagship news program
- CBC News Now
- The Fifth Estate, weekly news magazine
- Marketplace, consumer news magazine
- Power & Politics, political news program
- The Investigators with Diana Swain
- Local newscasts
- Documentary series Doc Zone, The Passionate Eye, CBC Docs POV and The Nature of Things air on CBC News Network but are not produced by CBC News.
- Rosemary Barton Live, Sunday news program replacing The Weekly with Wendy Mesley
- Hanomansing Tonight, weekday news program replacing Canada Tonight

Former programs:

- CBC News Magazine (1952–81)
- The Journal (1982–92)
- CBC Prime Time News (1992–1995)
- Mansbridge One on One (1999–2017)
- The Exchange (2009–2016)
- On the Money, business news program (2016–2018)
- The Weekly with Wendy Mesley (2018–2020)
- Canada Tonight, weekday news program, premiered with Ginella Massa as host, with Dwight Drummond as temporary host from October 2022 while Massa was on parental leave, and then Travis Dhanraj as permanent host January 2024 following Massa's departure from CBC.

=== Radio ===
CBC News provides the following radio programs.

- World Report, morning newscast
- The World This Hour, hourly newscast
- The World at Six, national dinner-hour newscast
- The World This Weekend
- The House, weekly national political affairs show
- Local newscasts

=== Digital ===
CBC Digital provides the following services:

- CBCNews.ca website and Digital News App
- Live and on-demand streaming of radio and TV news programming
- Podcasts (broadcast highlights and original content like Finding Cleo)
- Social media including Facebook. Instagram and Snapchat. CBC News Twitter feed has over 2.5M followers.
- Digital delivery of CBC News in airports, trains, elevators and coffee chain

== Bias allegations ==
A survey in 2002 suggested that the CBC’s viewers are more likely to be left leaning than viewers of Canadian commercial TV networks.

In 2009, CBC President Hubert Lacroix commissioned a study to determine whether its news was biased, and if so, to what extent. He said: "Our job — and we take it seriously — is to ensure that the information that we put out is fair and unbiased in everything that we do." The study suggests Canadians perceived the CBC as having a more left-of-centre bias than other Canadian news organizations.

A 2017 survey of Canadians found that CBC TV was perceived to be the most biased national news media outlet by Canadians (perceived biased by 50% of Canadians overall, tied with The Globe and Mail) followed closely by CBC Radio (perceived biased by 49% of Canadians overall). Respondents, especially those from Alberta, predominantly saw a bias towards CBC TV and radio coverage favouring the Liberal party, a view that held consistently across Conservative, Liberal and NDP voters.

In October 2025, the network was criticized for a report by Ben Makuch on the National about Ukrainian military training in the Russo-Ukrainian war. The report featured an in-person interview with a soldier from the 3rd Assault Brigade, a unit with historical ties to Neo-Nazism, and portrayed him in a positive light. During the interview, the CBC blurred a tattoo on the soldier's arm, which was clearly visible in some frames as a swastika.

== Hall of Fame ==
The CBC News Hall of Fame was established in 2015 to honour men and women who have shaped Canadian journalism. Located in CBC's Toronto headquarters, inductees include:

- 2015 – Knowlton Nash
- 2016 – Joe Schlesinger
- 2017 – Barbara Frum
- 2018 – Trina McQueen
- 2019 – Matthew Halton and Peter Stursberg
- 2020 – Ernest Tucker
- 2021 – Rassi Nashalik
- 2022 – Ann Medina
- 2023 – Adrienne Clarkson
- 2024 – Michael D'Souza
- 2026 – Colleen Jones

== Bureaus ==
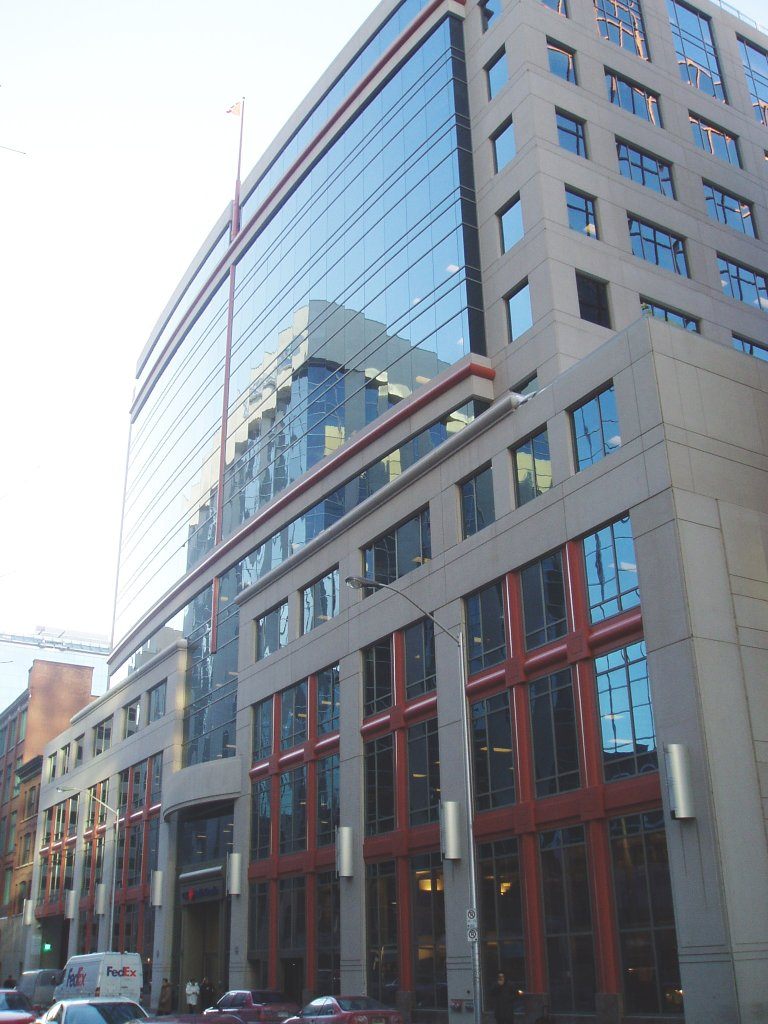
CBC Ottawa Broadcast Centre in Ottawa

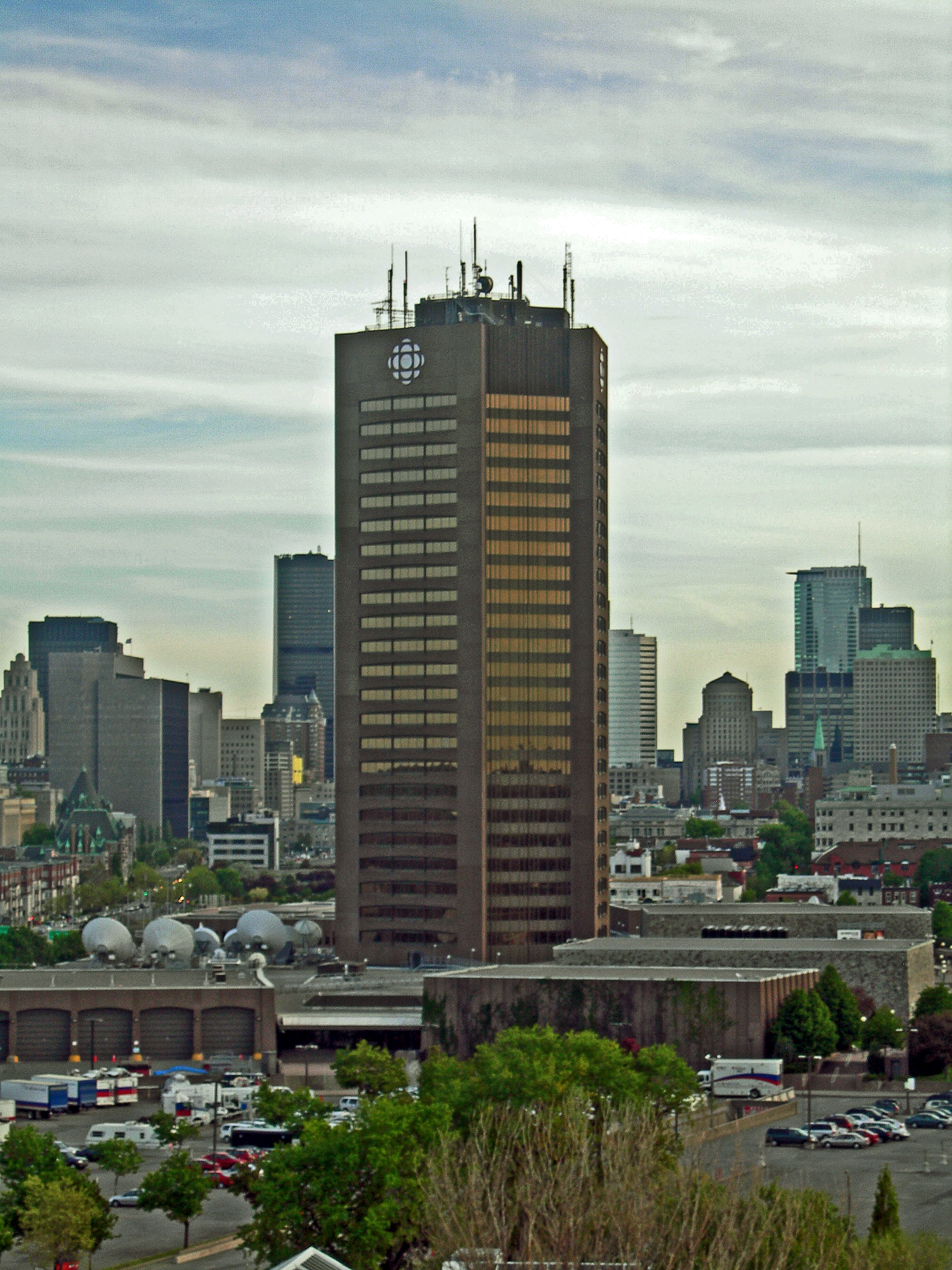
Maison de Radio-Canada in Montreal

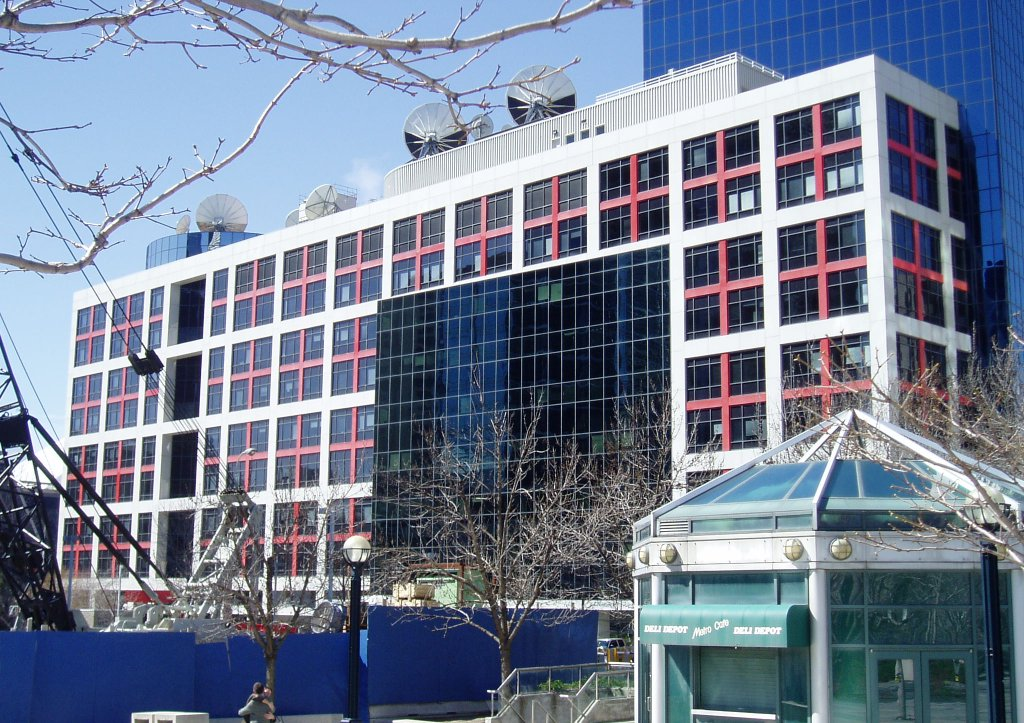
Canadian Broadcasting Centre in Toronto

CBC has reporters stationed in the following cities. Main cities are listed with the notation (M).

- Whitehorse, Yukon (M)
- Victoria, British Columbia
- Vancouver, British Columbia (M)
- Kamloops, British Columbia
- Kelowna, British Columbia
- Nelson, British Columbia
- Prince George, British Columbia
- Prince Rupert, British Columbia
- Yellowknife, Northwest Territories (M)
- Inuvik, Northwest Territories
- Calgary, Alberta (M)
- Edmonton, Alberta (M)
- Fort McMurray, Alberta
- Grande Prairie, Alberta
- Lethbridge, Alberta
- Saskatoon, Saskatchewan
- Regina, Saskatchewan (M)
- Winnipeg, Manitoba (M)
- Brandon, Manitoba
- Thunder Bay, Ontario
- Windsor, Ontario (M)
- London, Ontario
- Sudbury, Ontario
- Kingston, Ontario
- Kitchener-Waterloo, Ontario
- Hamilton, Ontario
- Toronto, Ontario (M)
- Ottawa, Ontario (M)
- Montreal, Quebec (M)
- Quebec City, Quebec (M)
- Sherbrooke, Quebec
- Fredericton, New Brunswick (M)
- Saint John, New Brunswick
- Happy Valley-Goose Bay, Newfoundland and Labrador
- Moncton, New Brunswick
- Bathurst, New Brunswick
- Halifax, Nova Scotia (M)
- Charlottetown, Prince Edward Island (M)
- Sydney, Nova Scotia
- Corner Brook, Newfoundland and Labrador
- Gander, Newfoundland and Labrador
- St. John's, Newfoundland and Labrador (M)
- Iqaluit, Nunavut

Currently vacant:

- Thompson, Manitoba
- Labrador City, Newfoundland and Labrador
- Hay River, Northwest Territories

=== International ===
- London, United Kingdom (M)
- Jerusalem, Israel (M)
- Washington, D.C., United States (M)
- New York City, United States (M)
- Los Angeles, United States

==== Former ====
- Moscow, Russia (closed May 2022)
- Beijing, China (closed November 2022; English-language posting vacant since 2020)

CBC also uses satellite bureaus, with reporters who fly in when a story occurs outside the bureaus. In the late 1990s, the CBC and other media outlets cut back their overseas operations.

== Foreign correspondents ==
- London – Margaret Evans, Chris Brown, and Jared Thomas
- Jerusalem – Derek Stoffel
- Washington, D.C. – Paul Hunter/Katie Simpson with Matt Kwong, Ellen Mauro, and Lyndsay Duncombe
- New York – Kris Reyes
- Los Angeles –

== See also ==
- List of Canadian Broadcasting Corporation personalities
- Ici Radio-Canada Télé
