= CBC Newsroom =

Canadian news TV program

- Also known as: CBC News Now (2009–2016); CBC News: Morning and CBC News: Today (daytime editions, c. 2000–2009)
- Presented by: Various
- Country of origin: Canada
- Original language: English

Production
- Production locations: Canadian Broadcasting Centre, Toronto
- Running time: Varies by daypart; 60 to 240 minutes

Original release
- Network: CBC News Network
- Release: 2000 – present

CBC Newsroom is the blanket title for the daytime rolling news programming block broadcast by the CBC News Network. The program has been broadcast under various titles, including CBC News: Today, and CBC News Now from 2009 to 2016. From 2016, the block had no formal title; it was listed in program guides as CBC News Network, before the introduction of the CBC Newsroom branding in 2023.

It is broadcast weekdays from 10 a.m. to 5 p.m. ET, Saturdays from 6 a.m. to 5:30 p.m. ET, and Sundays from 6 a.m. to 4 p.m. ET (with a two-hour break at 10 a.m. ET for Rosemary Barton Live) with additional evening broadcasts on weekdays (discussed below). On Saturdays, additional editions air at the 6, 9 and 11 p.m. half-hours. Deana Sumanac-Johnson is the main host of these editions.

A simulcast of CBC Newsroom is broadcast on all CBC Television stations from noon to 1 p.m. local time (also from 6 to 7 a.m. in regions where a local CBC Radio One morning show is not simulcast instead).

== Evening editions ==
Primetime airings of the program on weeknights, produced at the CBC Regional Broadcast Centre Vancouver and hosted by Ian Hanomansing, were added in fall 2012 as a replacement for Connect with Mark Kelley, a more resource-intensive program which had been cancelled due to CBC budget cuts, and for the weekday airings of The Passionate Eye. There are three such broadcasts each weeknight, during the 8 p.m., 10 p.m., and 1 a.m. hours (all times Eastern).

These editions are similar in format to the daytime airings but primarily featured Vancouver-based reporters including Sarah Galashan and Johanna Wagstaffe. For the first several months, the program closed with a segment called "The Edit", a montage highlighting the day's top stories.

On October 16, 2017, the Vancouver broadcasts were discontinued. They were replaced by a two-hour edition of CBC News Network at 7 p.m. ET, anchored from Toronto by Carole MacNeil. They were later replaced by two new programs, CBC Rundown and Canada Tonight. Rundown would be cancelled in 2023 in favour of expanding Canada Tonight to two hours.

== Notable hosts ==
=== From Toronto ===
- Heather Hiscox (Weekdays 6am-10am)
- Suhana Meharchand (Weekdays 10am-1pm)
- Carole MacNeil (Weeknights 7pm-9pm)
- Andrew Nichols (Weekdays 1pm-5pm)
- John Northcott (Weekends 6am-11am)
- Aarti Pole (Saturday 4pm-5pm, 6pm, 9pm, 11pm)
- Michael Serapio (Sunday 11:30am–4:30pm)
- Diana Swain
- Hannah Thibedeau
- Reshmi Nair
- Natasha Fatah
- Jennifer Hall

=== From Vancouver ===
- Sarah Galashan
- Ian Hanomansing
