= Christine Birak =

Canadian journalist

Christine Birak is a Canadian television journalist, currently a health and science reporter for CBC News. She won the Canadian Screen Award for Best National News Reporter at the 9th Canadian Screen Awards in 2021.

An employee of the CBC since the early 2000s, her reportage for The National was especially prominent in 2020 due to the prominence of the COVID-19 pandemic in Canada. She has also appeared on CBC News Network as an anchor of CBC News Now.

She holds a science degree from the University of Toronto.
