= David Common =

Canadian journalist

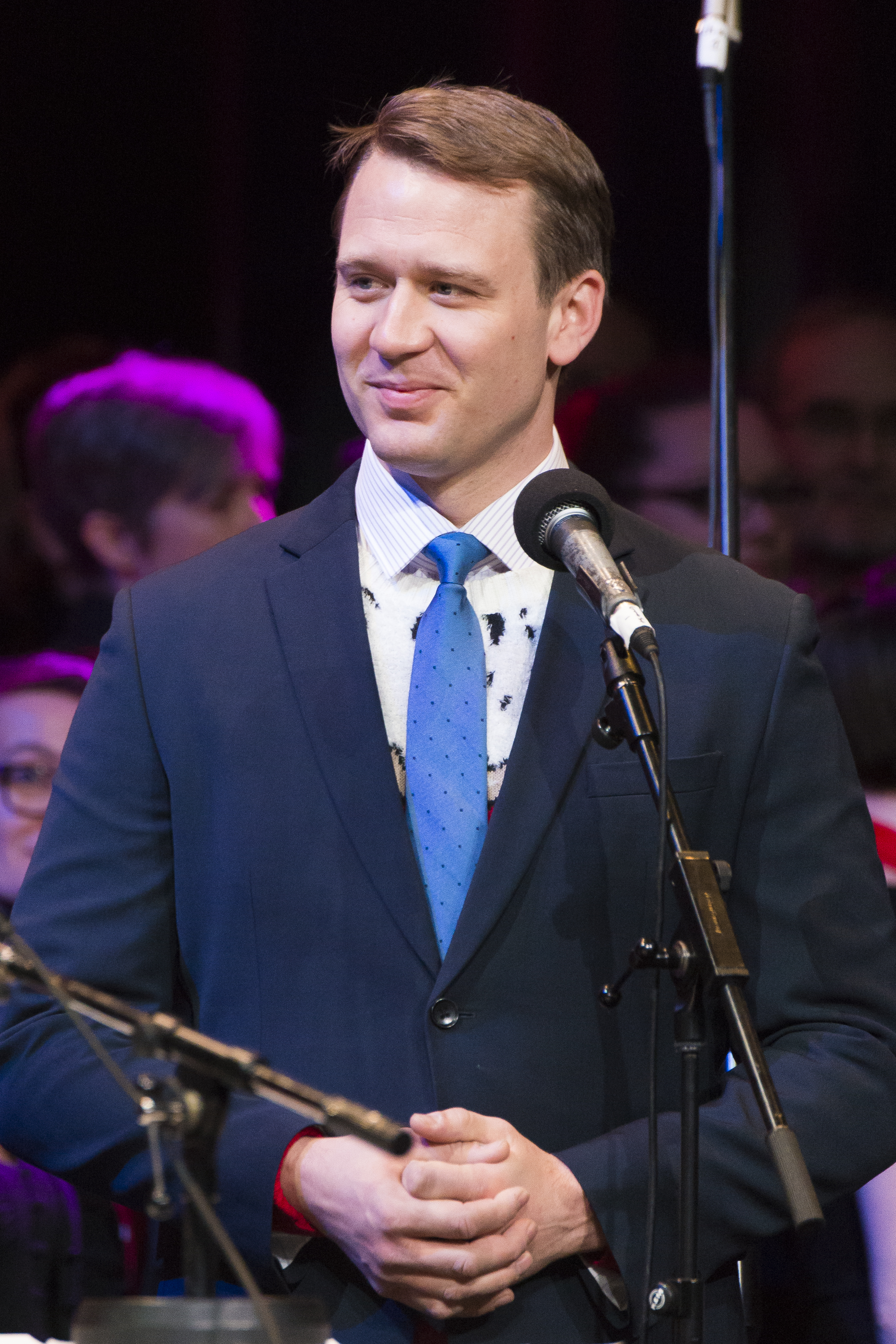
Common in 2017

David Common is a Canadian journalist, best known as a correspondent and anchor for CBC News, and cohost with Asha Tomlinson and Charlsie Agro of CBC Television's consumer affairs newsmagazine Marketplace. As of February 2, 2026, he is host of CBC Morning Live on CBC News Network.

Born and raised in Winnipeg, Manitoba and grew up in Toronto, Ontario, where he attended Jarvis Collegiate Institute and York University in 1995. In 1998, as part of an exchange program, Common completed a specialization in International Security Studies at Stockholm University in Stockholm, Sweden.

Common has worked for CTV and CBC News. He began with CBC at the London Bureau, moving later to Toronto, Fredericton, Regina, and eventually back to Toronto as a national reporter before being posted to Paris, France in 2006. From France, he travelled extensively in the western and eastern parts of European continent and North Africa, shooting, and editing his own stories.

In 2009, Common transferred to New York City, where he worked as a CBC's correspondent in that city, though he covered 2010 Haiti earthquake, and the 65th anniversary of V-E Day celebrations in the Netherlands. Common has filed reports from across Canada, the United States, Mexico, Europe, Australia, and New Zealand, as well as helped cover conflicts in Haiti, Afghanistan, and Iraq. He was one of the main weekday anchor of CBC Radio One's morning newscast World Report for a number of years in the 2010s.

In 2020 during COVID-19 pandemic (2020–21), Common was a guest host for several weeks on Metro Morning, CBC Radio's local morning show on CBLA-FM in Toronto, but did not take over the program permanently at that time. He was named the program's permanent host in October 2023.

In November 2025, the CBC announced that Common would become the new host of CBC Morning Live on CBC News Network in February 2026, following the retirement of Heather Hiscox from the network. He debuted in the new role on February 2.

He has received several awards, and was nominated for a Gemini Award twice in the Best Reportage category, winning once.
