= Suhana =

Suhana is a given name and a surname. Notable people with the name include:

- Sos Suhana (born 1992), Cambodian footballer
- Suhana Meharchand (born 1962), Canadian television journalist
- Suhana Thapa (born 1997), Nepali actress
