= CBC News: Politics =

2009 Canadian political news TV series

CBC News: Politics is a Canadian political affairs television series which aired weekdays on CBC Newsworld, which was hosted by Don Newman. The show was discontinued and replaced with an additional hour of CBC News: Today upon Newman's retirement in 2009; in the fall, the new series Power & Politics, hosted by Evan Solomon, debuted.
