= Danielle LaPorte =

- Born: May 25; Windsor, Ontario, Canada
- Occupations: Writer, Public Speaker, Publisher
- Children: 1
- Website: www.daniellelaporte.com

Danielle LaPorte (born May 25) is a Canadian author, entrepreneur, and blogger.

== Early life ==
Danielle LaPorte was born in Windsor, Ontario, and grew up in the rural parts of Essex County. She is an only child, born shortly after her parents graduated high school. LaPorte did not attend college or university.

== Career ==
She started her career as a personal assistant and marketing support for some self-help authors and then moved into freelance publicity.

Without a college degree, LaPorte then started working at The Body Shop in one of their retail stores. After receiving several promotions, LaPorte became director of Social Inventions at The Body Shop's Canadian headquarters.

Before founding her eponymous website, LaPorte was the executive director of The Arlington Institute think tank in Washington, DC, a partner at Carrie & Danielle, Inc., and a communications strategist at The Next Level communications agency. She was also a regular contributor on business and career topics on the Canadian Broadcasting Corporation news network show "Connect with Mark Kelley".

In 2016, LaPorte founded Virtuonica, a multimedia publishing division of Danielle LaPorte, Inc.

== Works ==
=== Books ===
- Style Statement, Little, Brown and Company, 2008, ISBN 0-316-06716-4 (co-authored with Carrie McCarthy)
- The Fire Starter Sessions, Crown Archetype, April 2012, ISBN 978-0-307-95210-3
- The Desire Map, White Hot Press (Danielle LaPorte Inc.), December 2012
- The Desire Map, (revised edition) Sounds True, January 2014, ISBN 978-1-62203-251-8
- The Desire Map, (Spanish edition) Sounds True, ISBN 978-84-414-3576-6
- White Hot Truth, Virtuonica, May 2017, ISBN 978-0-9976514-0-9
- White Hot Truth eBook, Virtuonica, May 2017, ISBN 978-0-9976514-5-4
- How to Be Loving: As Your Heart Is Breaking Open and Our World Is Waking Up, Sounds True, October 2022, ISBN 978-1683647621
- How to Be Loving: The Journal: Relax Your Mind. Connect with the Divine., Sounds True, November 2022, ISBN 978-1683647645

=== Audiobooks ===
- The Desire Map Experience, Sounds True, January 2014, ISBN 978-1-62203-243-3
- The Desire Map Daily, Sounds True, January 2014, ISBN 978-1-62203-244-0
- The Desire Map Audiobook, Sounds True, January 2014
- White Hot Truth Audiobook, Virtuonica, May 2017 ISBN 978-0-9976514-6-1
- The Fire Starter Sessions Audio Course
- How to Be Loving: As Your Heart Is Breaking Open and Our World Is Waking Up, Sounds True, October 2022

=== Decks ===
- Truthbomb Card Deck - Volume 1 (2017 revisions), ISBN 978-0-9969052-8-2
- Truthbomb Card Deck - Volume 2 (2017 revisions), ISBN 978-0-9969052-8-2
- How to Be Loving: The Deck: For Resilience, Kindness, and All Kinds of Idealism (November 2022), ISBN 978-1683647652
