= Rough Cuts (TV series) =

Canadian television series

Rough Cuts is a Canadian television series, which aired on CBC Newsworld. Launched in 1994, the series presents documentary films by new and independent journalists and producers. One of its hosts was Michaëlle Jean, who subsequently served as Governor General of Canada from 2005 to 2010.

The show was called "a bright spot for Canadian independent documentaries not only on the CBC, but on Canadian television in general."

The series has also aired on the main CBC Television network. It has since been replaced on CBC Television by Doc Zone, and on CBC Newsworld by a "showcase" edition of The Passionate Eye.
