= Erica Johnson =

Canadian broadcast journalist

- Education: Toronto Metropolitan University
- Occupations: Journalist; television host
- Years active: 1987–present
- Known for: Marketplace, CBC News: The National

Erica Johnson is a Canadian broadcast journalist who currently hosts the TV series Go Public on CBC Television, and formerly hosted Marketplace on CBC Television. Johnson has won numerous awards, including several Jack Webster Awards, RTNDA Awards, a Gabriel, a Freddie Award and a 2011 Leo Award.

== Biography ==
Johnson was born in Vancouver, British Columbia. A graduate of Ryerson Polytechnical Institute (now Toronto Metropolitan University) in Toronto, Johnson began her journalism career in radio in 1987, working at several private radio stations, including Vancouver's CKO and Toronto's CFRB. In 1990, she began working at the CBC as a radio news reporter for the local Toronto affiliate CBL.

Johnson moved from radio to CBC Television in 1993, creating and reporting on The Health Show. She then returned to Vancouver to become a news reporter and anchor for the Vancouver affiliate CBUT. Her specialty areas included health and financial reporting, with a particular interest in social justice issues.

Johnson joined Marketplace as a reporter, and eventually became co-host of the program alongside Wendy Mesley in Toronto. Johnson currently hosts the investigative consumer news segment "Go Public" and is a regular host of CBC's flagship news program, "The National".

Johnson has won numerous awards, including several Jack Webster Awards, RTNDA Awards, Canadian Association of Journalists awards, a Gabriel, a Freddie Award and a 2011 Leo Award for best host of an information series. She has also been nominated for four Gemini awards as Best Host or Interviewer in a News/Information Program, as well as Canadian Screen Awards for Best News or Information Segment at the 4th Canadian Screen Awards and Best National News Reporter at the 7th Canadian Screen Awards.

== Filmography ==
=== Television ===
Year	Title	Role	Notes
2000-2022	Marketplace	Host	62 episodes
2024-present	The National	Regular Host	100+ episodes

== Awards and nominations ==
Year	Awards	Category	Nominated work	Result
2008	Gemini Awards	Best Lifestyle / Practical Information Segment	Marketplace segment "Can't Buy Me Love"	Nominated
2010	Gemini Awards Leo Awards Gemini Awards	Best Host(s) in an Information or Lifestyle Series	Marketplace episode: "Miracle Makers or Money Takers"	Nominated
2011	Gemini Awards Leo Awards Gemini Awards	Best Host(s) in an Information or Lifestyle Series	Marketplace episode: "Cure or Con?"	Won
2012	Gemini Awards Leo Awards Gemini Awards	Best Host(s) in an Information or Lifestyle Series	Marketplace	Nominated
2014	2nd Canadian Screen Awards	Best Host or Interviewer in a News Information Program or Series	Marketplace	Nominated
