= CBC Television local newscasts =

Local newscasts for CBC television in Canada

CBC News produces a variety of local newscasts for CBC Television's owned-and-operated stations (O&Os) throughout Canada. On most stations, the local news operation is branded with standard, regional titles such as CBC Toronto News. However, there are variations to this naming convention for northern Canada and certain markets where the CBC has historically been strong in local news, such as Here & Now in Newfoundland, Compass on Prince Edward Island, and Northbeat on CBC North.

== Overview ==
Currently, most CBC O&Os produce either a full-hour or a 30-minute local newscast during the early evening on weeknights. In addition, most stations air a late-night newscast for ten or thirty minutes at 11 p.m. following The National. This schedule varies for some stations depending on available resources or local considerations. CBET-DT Windsor previously aired its 90-minute evening newscast at 5:30 p.m. until the revamping of CBC's local news operations in October 2015 (it now airs for 30 minutes beginning at 5:59 p.m.), while CBNT-DT St. John's formerly aired CBC News: Here & Now - Early Edition at 5:30 p.m. Newfoundland Time until October 2015, followed by the hour-long CBC News: Here & Now at 6:00 p.m. NT.

Local evening newscasts are produced in all three Maritime provinces, but a single late-night newscast for the region was produced at CBHT-DT Halifax. In November 2024, the CBC announced that it would introduce local late-night newscasts across its four Atlantic Canada stations. Likewise, the Alberta stations in Calgary and Edmonton produce their own evening newscasts, but a single late-night provincial newscast (CBC Alberta News) is produced in Edmonton at CBXT-DT.

To serve Indigenous communities within Northern Canada, CBC North broadcasts two 30-minute evening newscasts: Northbeat—which is presented in English and several Aboriginal languages (translated with English subtitles), and Igalaaq (ᐃᒐᓛᖅ, "Window")—a newscast presented in the Inuit language of Inuktitut. CBC North does not carry a weekend newscast of its own, instead simulcasting CBC Alberta News.

Until 2011, CBUT-DT Vancouver was the only CBC O&O to produce weekend newscasts, with half-hour programs on Saturday nights at 10:30 p.m. (after Hockey Night in Canada) and Sundays at 11:00 p.m. On October 15, 2011, CBLT added a half-hour 6 p.m. newscast on Saturdays, and a ten-minute news bulletin on Sundays at 10:55 p.m.; CBRT-DT Calgary would also join CBUT and CBLT in carrying weekend local news programming during the fall of 2011, and CBNT-DT St. John's launched a local weekend newscast in the spring of 2012, as part of a five-year strategy by the CBC to improve its services to six million Canadian homes unserved or underserved by CBC's radio, television and internet services.

On September 2, 2013, CBET Windsor expanded its early evening newscast to 90 minutes from 5:30 to 7 p.m., while its 11 p.m. newscast was replaced by CBLT's newscast at that time, differing from most CBC O&Os in other markets where the station carries both an early and late evening newscast of its own. Asha Tomlinson became anchor of the expanded newscast, replacing Amanda Ferguson, who became anchor during Susan Pedler's maternity leave.

== History ==
Prior to fall 2000, CBC stations produced local newscasts under a variety of titles, including Broadcast One at CBUT, 24 Hours at CBWT Winnipeg, CBC Evening News at CBLT Toronto, Compass at CBCT Charlottetown, and Here & Now at CBNT. These were typically one-hour broadcasts aired at 6:00 p.m. local, 6:30 p.m. NT. 30-minute late local newscasts, in many cases titled Newsfinal, were also aired in most markets at 11:30 p.m. local / midnight NT. The late newscasts were abandoned briefly during the Prime Time News era, resumed in the mid-1990s, and cancelled again in 2000.

In early 2000, the CBC (under president Robert Rabinovitch) announced a plan to eliminate local newscasts except in Northern Canada, believing that the dominance of private competitors had made these programs redundant. Local newscasts were to be replaced by a national supper-hour program with limited local inserts. This plan, and particularly the fact that exceptions would not be made for the CBC's highly rated newscasts in Newfoundland and Labrador and Prince Edward Island, led to protests across the country, and most strongly in those two markets.

As a compromise, CBC News introduced Canada Now as a replacement for its 6:00 p.m. newscasts outside of the north, which consisted of a half-hour national newscast hosted by Ian Hanomansing in Vancouver, followed by a half-hour local newscast. While the PEI newscast remained relatively strong (as the only newscast produced on the island), ratings dropped across the board, most dramatically in Newfoundland where CBNT's local news ratings decreased by more than 50% between 2000 and 2004.

By 2005, the CBC had decided to rethink this strategy and began to expand local news again at certain stations, beginning with CBNT, where an hour-long Here & Now newscast resumed on November 7. In most other markets, local news returned to the 6:00 p.m. time slot in early 2006, mainly under the banner CBC News at Six, although these remained as 30-minute newscasts. (Canada Now was retained as a separate 30-minute national newscast at 6:30 p.m., as well as the title of the integrated local/national newscast aired within British Columbia.)

Montreal's anchor, Dennis Trudeau retired shortly before the launch of CBC News at Six, having hosted the local bulletins for many years.

On November 10, 2006, it was revealed that Janet Stewart would host CBC Winnipeg's edition of News at Six starting in January 2007. Stewart was a popular anchor at top-rated rival CKY-TV and her move to News at Six surprised many in the local media.

On November 30, 2006 it was announced that as part of its focus on reinvigorating local news, CBC News at Six would expand to a full hour in February 2007, signalling the end of the national Canada Now program (although that title was temporarily retained for CBUT's local newscast).

During summer 2007, CBC News' Vancouver operation became a test-site for an experimental newscast bringing together staff from local CBC radio, television and online services to create an interactive local newscast that employs a concept called "civic journalism". If successful, the format was then to be gradually be applied to CBC News at Six programs across the country over a three-year period. Former Canada Now anchor Ian Hanomansing was reassigned to co-host the new Vancouver program on CBUT, alongside Gloria Macarenko (he has since been reassigned to The National as reporter and substitute anchor, replaced in Vancouver by veteran anchor Tony Parsons).

In July 2009, CBC expanded its local news programs again to 90 minutes, running from 5 p.m. to 6:30 p.m. local time on most stations, with exceptions as noted above (this allowed CBC to carry Wheel of Fortune and Jeopardy! in the 7:00 p.m. hour—with the corresponding simsub privileges in many markets—preceded by Coronation Street, which formerly occupied the 7:00 p.m. time slot, at 6:30 p.m.). This was followed on October 26, 2009 by the return of late local news on most CBC stations with a ten-minute bulletin following The National. Until that date, only CBUT carried a brief 11 p.m. post-National local newscast.

On September 17, 2012, CBC's late local newscasts were expanded to a full half-hour in major markets, including Calgary, Edmonton, the Maritimes, Montreal, Ottawa, Toronto and Vancouver. The majority of CBC stations now also air local or regional newscasts on weekends.

In December 2014, CBC announced changes to its local news operations that took effect as of the 2015-16 television season. 90-minute evening newscasts were cut down to 60 or 30 minutes, with Charlottetown, Halifax, St. John's, Ottawa, Toronto, Vancouver, and Winnipeg cut down to an hour-long newscast, and Calgary, Edmonton, Fredericton, Montreal, Regina, and Windsor cut down to a single half-hour. On CBC North, Northbeat and Inuktitut-language Igalaaq each air for half an hour. The stations also began to air local, top-of-hour news updates during the afternoons and primetime, and, except on CBC North, air simulcasts of local CBC Radio One morning shows at 6:00 a.m. local time. The change came as part of a shift towards digital and mobile platforms for news output, along with a desire to build "a comprehensive, four-platform local news service — across the day and on demand" with less emphasis on evening newscasts.

In March 2020, amid the COVID-19 pandemic in Canada, the CBC suspended all local television newscasts aside from those of CBC North, citing health and safety protocols, and a lack of staff at the Canadian Broadcasting Centre (where control rooms have been centralized since 2019). The CBC directed all resources to CBC News Network (which was aired in place of the newscasts, and featured contributions from local reporters. Some CBC stations continued to produce shortened, digital-only newscasts. The decision faced criticism for reducing the amount of local coverage of the pandemic's impact—especially in markets where the CBC is the only local source of news programming. The move faced criticism from the Canadian Media Guild, Friends of Canadian Broadcasting, and Premier of Prince Edward Island Dennis King. The Gazette media writer Steve Faguy noted that the CBC's situation was unusual, as CTV and Global also employed centralization, and did not have any similar interruptions to its news programming.

On March 24, the CBC stated that it would "make every effort to have all of the dedicated local shows back up on the main network" over the next few weeks; at this time, CBC News Network began to air regionalized blocks of coverage during the windows of its evening newscasts in each time zone. By early-April, local newscasts began to be reinstated.

In November 2024, the CBC announced new local 11 p.m./11:30 p.m. NT newscasts on its Charlottetown, Fredericton, Halifax, and St. John's stations.

== Program details ==
Times for the majority of CBC regional news programs are 5:59 p.m. - 6:30 p.m. or 7 p.m. and 11 p.m. - 11:10 p.m. or 11:30 p.m., and titles follow the standard naming conventions described above, unless otherwise specified. For additional details, refer to individual station pages.

- Calgary
- Charlottetown
- Edmonton
- Fredericton
- Halifax
- Montreal
- Ottawa
- Regina
- St. John's
- Toronto
- Vancouver
- Windsor
- Winnipeg
- CBC North

== See also ==
- Le Téléjournal - umbrella title for Radio-Canada's French-language national and regional newscasts
