= Dwight Drummond =

Canadian television journalist (born 1968)

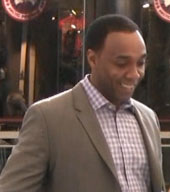
- Born: September 22, 1968 (age 58); Montego Bay, Jamaica
- Education: Ryerson University
- Occupation: Television journalist

Dwight Drummond (born September 22, 1968) is a Canadian television journalist who currently hosts CBC News Toronto. He previously hosted Canada Tonight on CBC News Network and was also the anchor of CBC Toronto News with Dwight Drummond at CBLT, CBC Television's station in Toronto, Ontario, Canada.

== Career ==
Drummond moved to Canada in 1976 and was raised in Toronto's Jane and Finch neighbourhood. He attended high school at Runnymede Collegiate Institute, and is a graduate of the Radio and Television Arts program at Ryerson University (now known as Toronto Metropolitan University).

Drummond was Citytv's crime specialist. He started out at Citytv as a security guard on Electric Circus in 1989. He has since worked as a teleprompter operator, floor director, studio cameraman, deputy chief of assignment, anchor of CityNews Streetbeat, and videographer for CityNews. During this time, he appeared in the Maestro Fresh-Wes music video "Let Your Backbone Slide" as the cameraman at the beginning sequences.

In 1995, Drummond was accosted by two Toronto Police officers in what the officers described as a "high-risk takedown", but which was characterized by outside observers as a racial profiling assault as there was no evidence that Drummond had done anything. The allegation of police misconduct was one of several which contributed to a wildcat strike by police officers in the summer of 1995; Bill Blair, a supporter of community policing models, was assigned to head the affected police division in response to the strike (Blair later rose to be Toronto police chief). The incident also reportedly contributed to Drummond's own decision to move from a technical to an on-air journalist's role with Citytv.

Drummond previously anchored CityNews at Noon and was later made anchor for another newscast, CityNews at Five. Due to the Citytv layoffs in January 2010, Drummond lost his anchoring job, but continued to work as the station's crime specialist. He left the station September 6, 2010.

On October 12, 2010, he joined Anne-Marie Mediwake as co-anchor for supper hour newscasts for CBC News: Toronto on CBC Toronto. Mediwake left the program to join CTV's Your Morning in 2016. Drummond was the principal anchor of the renamed CBC Toronto News with Dwight Drummond until October 2022, when he joined CBC News Network as the host of the Canada Tonight; he filled in for regular host Ginella Massa, who was on maternity leave.

== Awards ==
In May 2021, Drummond won the Canadian Screen Award for Best Local News Anchor at the 9th Canadian Screen Awards. He was previously nominated in the same category at the 4th Canadian Screen Awards in 2016, the 6th Canadian Screen Awards in 2018, and the 7th Canadian Screen Awards in 2019.

In June 2023, Drummond was conferred an honorary Doctor of Law by Toronto Metropolitan University.
