= Dave Brindle =

Canadian broadcast journalist and producer

David Brindle is a Canadian broadcast journalist and producer.

An anchor for CBC Radio and Television, and CBC Newsworld in the 1980s and 1990s, he was Canada's first television personality to publicly acknowledge that he was HIV-positive.
