= Kathleen Petty =

Canadian journalist

Kathleen Petty is a Canadian radio and television news journalist. She worked for almost two decades for the CBC News Network, where she was co-founder producer and host. When CBC Newsworld was launched in 1989 she was the anchor. She also hosted Canada Now for the Network and CBC News: Today from Calgary with co-host David Gray. She worked in Ottawa from 2006 until 2011, hosting CBC Radio Ottawa's, including Ottawa Morning, Ontario Today and the nationally-broadcast The House. In 2011, she announced that she was returning to Calgary. In February 2020, CBC announced the launch of a new podcast, West of Centre, with Petty as producer and host.

== Background ==
In the 1980s, Petty was a co-founder producer and hosts for the CBC News Network where she worked for almost twenty years. She worked as CBC Newsworld's anchor from its launch in 1989 until 2006. In Calgary, Petty hosted CBC News Network's Canada Now and she co-hosted CBC News: Today from Calgary with David Gray.

In 2006, Petty moved to Ottawa to host programming for CBC Radio Ottawa, including the local morning show Ottawa Morning, the provincial Ontario Today and the nationally-broadcast The House, a programme about Canadian politics.

On May 31, 2011, Petty announced that, as of fall 2011, she would be giving up both roles to move back to her native Calgary to take a position hosting the CBC Radio Calgary morning program Calgary Eyeopener.

Petty has been a regular contributor to CBC's federal election coverage and has also appeared on Power and Politics.

By 2020, Kathleen Petty was the Executive Producer of News for CBC Calgary.

In 2019, CBC announced that Petty would be the producer and host of their new Calgary-based "election-focused pop-up bureau", West of Centre, a podcast that provides news and analysis with a western voice and perspective. Guests have included Cenovus Energy's CEO Alex Pourbaix, MEG Energy's CEO Derek Evans, Alberta's federal Senators, Paula Simons, and Doug Black.

== Personal life ==
On August 11, 2011 during the last episode of Ottawa Morning, Petty announced that she was dealing with a health issue and that she would temporarily delay her move to Calgary. In a March 27, 2012 interview with the Ottawa Citizen's Shelley Page, Page described Petty as an "ace interviewer" who was used working "14-hour days" prior to her breast cancer diagnosis, which resulted in a double mastectomy. In the interview Petty said that at first she wanted to keep her health issues private, but as her cancer treatments progressed, she felt she could "give voice" to what many women have experienced.
