= Rosemary Barton =

Canadian political journalist

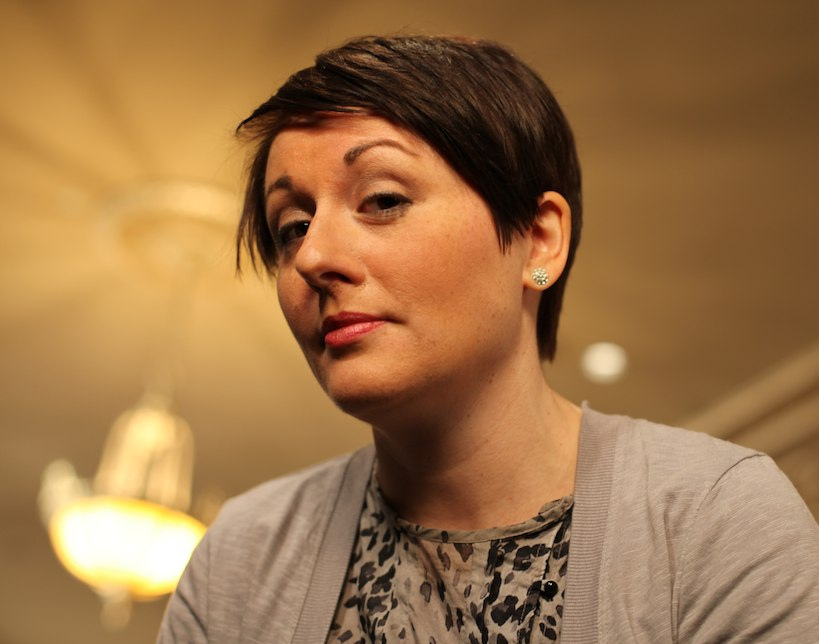
- Barton in 2011
- Born: May 31, 1976 (age 50); Winnipeg, Manitoba, Canada
- Education: Collège universitaire de Saint-Boniface; Carleton University
- Presenting career
- Show: The National (2017–2020); Rosemary Barton Live (2020–present)
- Network: CBC Television; CBC News Network

Rosemary Barton (born May 31, 1976) is a Canadian political journalist, currently serving as the chief political correspondent for CBC. In this role, she anchors her own Sunday morning news show, Rosemary Barton Live, hosts the "At Issue" segment on The National, and leads special coverage for the network including during elections, breaking news and national emergencies.

Barton anchored CBC's election coverage during the 2019, 2021 and 2025 Canadian federal elections, following the retirement of Peter Mansbridge, including one-on-one interviews with the federal party leaders.

== Early career ==
Originally from Winnipeg, Manitoba, Barton began working in journalism as a researcher for the Canadian Broadcasting Corporation's French-language news network RDI before becoming a National Assembly of Quebec correspondent for Global News. She rejoined the CBC in 2004, initially in the same role as a provincial political correspondent she held at Global, before transferring to the national Parliament Hill bureau in 2007.

She began appearing on Power & Politics in 2011 as the program's main substitute host.

== Host of Power & Politics ==
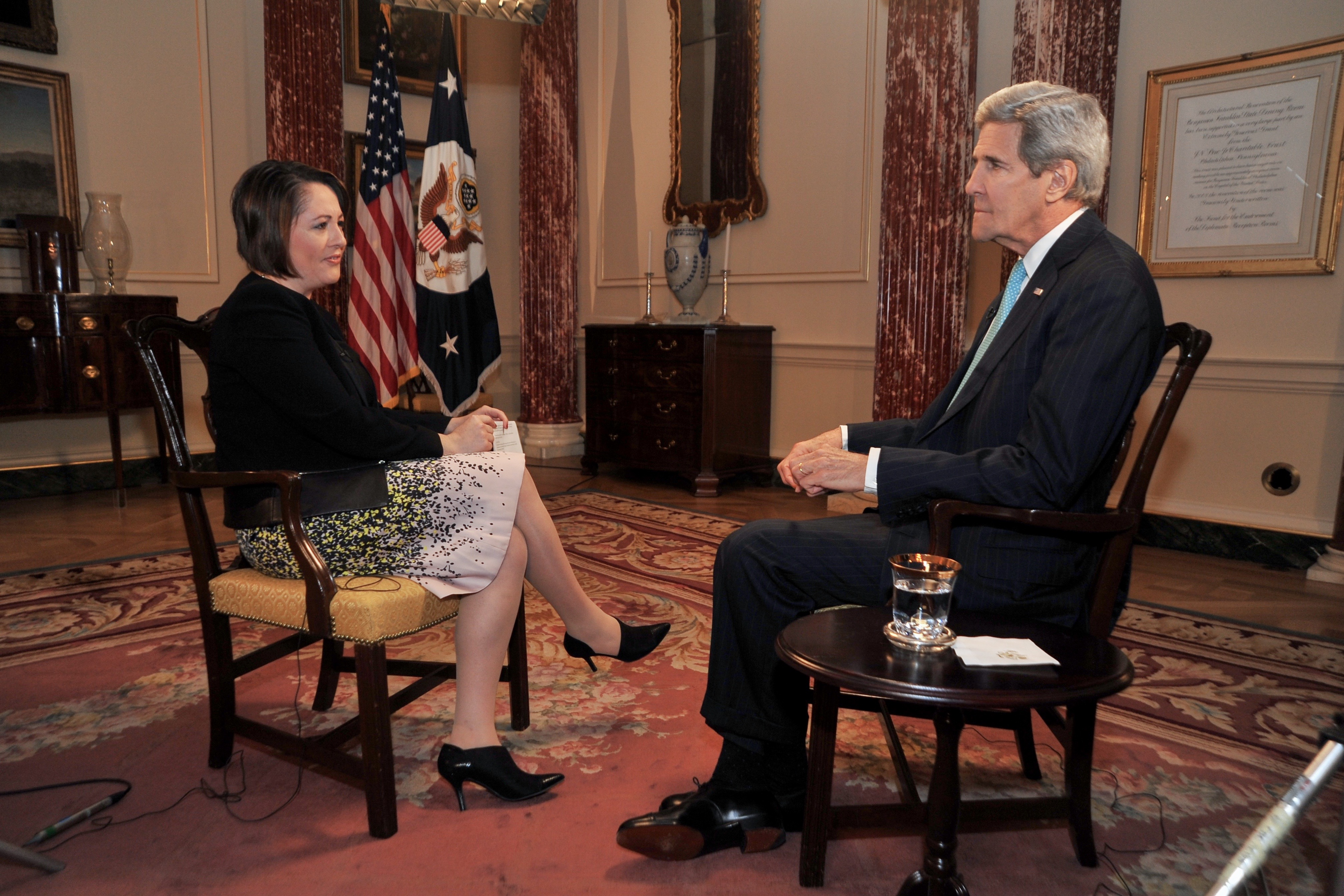
Barton interviewing US Secretary of State John Kerry in 2016

Following the dismissal of Evan Solomon by the CBC in 2015, Barton became interim host of Power & Politics. Her interview style was lauded by fellow journalists, sometimes contrasted favourably against Solomon.

Barton gained popularity following her response to statements made by then-Minister of Citizenship and Immigration Chris Alexander on Power & Politics during the 2015 election campaign, when he attempted to deflect a question on the government's handling of Syrian refugees during a panel discussion by blaming the media (and Barton) for not drawing enough attention to the crisis. Barton called Alexander's statements "completely false," offered to provide clips of previous shows where the Syrian refugee crisis had been discussed, and challenged him to admit he "[wanted to] avoid the question."

She was officially named as the new permanent host of the show on January 5, 2016. At the 4th Canadian Screen Awards in 2016, Barton won the award for Best Host or Interviewer in a News or Information Program or Series.

== Co-host of The National ==
On November 6, 2017, Barton debuted as a co-host of The National, CBC Television's flagship newscast, alongside Adrienne Arsenault, Andrew Chang and Ian Hanomansing. She was succeeded as host of Power & Politics by Vassy Kapelos, formerly host of Global's The West Block.

In January 2020, Barton transitioned to a role as CBC's chief political correspondent after CBC decided to discontinue The National's four-anchor format. Barton continues to contribute to The National as host of "At Issue" panel discussions with political operatives featuring Andrew Coyne, Althia Raj and Chantal Hébert.

During the COVID-19 pandemic, Barton led CBC's coverage of Prime Minister Justin Trudeau's daily press briefings from March to July 2020.

== Host of Rosie Barton Live ==
Barton hosted the weekend political talk series Sunday Scrum on CBC News Network, which was retitled Rosemary Barton Live as of November 1, 2020. Rosemary Barton Live is a Canadian Sunday morning political affairs program that premiered on CBC News Network and CBC Television on November 1, 2020. The live weekly program airs from 10 a.m. to noon ET on CBC News Network and is simulcast on CBC Television. It replaced The Weekly with Wendy Mesley.

== Education ==
Barton is a graduate of the Collège universitaire de Saint-Boniface (a francophone affiliated college of the University of Manitoba) and Carleton University.
