= Mark Kelley =

Canadian journalist

- Born: Beaconsfield, Quebec, Canada
- Education: Concordia University
- Occupations: Journalist; TV presenter

Mark Kelley is a Canadian television journalist, associated with CBC News. Formerly a correspondent and substitute anchor for The National and a host of CBC News: Morning, he hosted Connect with Mark Kelley on CBC News Network from 2009 to 2012, and joined the newsmagazine the fifth estate in 2012.

== Education and career ==
A graduate of Concordia University in Montreal, the fluently bilingual Kelley began reporting from within Quebec in the 1980s before joining CBC in 1990. From 2002 to 2004, he was co-host of the investigative journalism show CBC News: Disclosure with Diana Swain.

Recently, Kelley has moved away from being a regular reporter to focusing on documentaries and investigative journalism, making a series of ongoing stories on The National. His focus is often on issues of prejudice or controversy. Among his recent projects of this type were reports on the aftermath of the 2004 Tsunami and a series of reports from the Netherlands where he tried to get an insight into the growing anti-Muslim feelings there. He also made a series of reports where he sought to break down Canadian national stereotypes by accompanying Canadians with prejudices about certain people or provinces to visit them. In November 2006, he began a series called "7" where he would spend seven days in someone else's shoes, such as a teacher at British Columbia's most troubled high school.

Kelley has won several Gemini Awards for his work.
