= Norman DePoe =

Canadian reporter

- Born: Norman Reade DePoe; 4 May 1917; Portland, Oregon, U.S.
- Died: 13 March 1980 (aged 62); Toronto, Ontario, Canada
- Education: University of British Columbia; University of Toronto
- Occupations: News broadcaster; Host of CBC News Magazine
- Years active: 1948-1976
- Spouse(s): Madeleine Mihalko; Mary Elizabeth Blackwood
- Children: 7

Norman Reade DePoe (4 May 1917 – 13 March 1980) was the first television news reporter for the Canadian Broadcasting Corporation on Parliament Hill for eight years in the 1960s covering national and international affairs.

Born in Portland, Oregon, he arrived in Canada at age 6, attended the University of British Columbia and then the University of Toronto after serving "as a signals corps captain in Italy and northwest Europe during WWII." After joining the CBC news service in 1948 he was a creator of its television news and current affairs broadcasts in the following decade, and a household name. "He set standards that proved enduring" though his fame was primarily in the 1960s and he died a decade later at age 62.

== See also ==
- List of Canadian Broadcasting Corporation personalities
