= Canada Now =

Canadian national news program

- Also known as: CBC News: Canada Now
- Presented by: National: Ian Hanomansing; Regional: varies by station
- Country of origin: Canada

Production
- Running time: 60 minutes (National: 30 minutes; Regional: 30 minutes)

Original release
- Network: CBC Television
- Release: October 2, 2000 – February 16, 2007

Canada Now (more formally CBC News: Canada Now) is an early-evening national news program that aired on CBC Television, the main English television network of the Canadian Broadcasting Corporation, between 2000 and 2007. For most of its run, it was structured as a hybrid national-regional newscast, with each portion being 30 minutes in length.

== History ==
The program was created to replace the regular supper-hour newscasts on the CBC's owned-and-operated local television stations in 2000, as a result of cuts to the CBC's budget. While initially thought to be a national newscast with limited local inserts, it was later revealed that the program would cover both local and national news as an hour-long newscast divided into two thirty-minute sub-programs. One was national in scope, anchored by Ian Hanomansing at the network's Vancouver studio; the other was regional, varying from station to station, and presented by the stations' local anchors as with the previous local newscasts. Some of the regional portions were also seen on the CBC's digital specialty channel Country Canada.

The national half of Canada Now was also broadcast on CBC Newsworld, and was paired with a half-hour current affairs program (which shared the Canada Now title) hosted by Kathleen Petty in Calgary; the Calgary-produced segment was canceled after Petty left for CBC Ottawa. Due to the unique circumstances of the Canadian territories, CBC North did not broadcast the national portion, and continued its own separate newscast, CBC News: Northbeat. CBC's privately owned affiliates were not affected by the budget cut, and continued producing their own local newscasts; most of the privately owned affiliates did not broadcast Canada Now.

By 2005, the corporation began taking tentative steps towards expanding local news programming, with CBNT in St. John's reinstating a full-hour newscast in November under its pre-2000 title, Here and Now. CBC made further changes to the early evening news slot in early 2006, with the return of separate local 30-minute newscasts (titled CBC News at Six (province or city name)) in most markets; Canada Now was reformatted as a half-hour program focussed on national and international news shown at 6:30 p.m. (The original Canada Now format and name continued to be used for the integrated local/national newscast aired on CBUT in Vancouver.)

On November 30, 2006, CBC Television announced that it would cancel Canada Now and expand the local CBC News at Six broadcasts to a full hour in the coming year, thereby reverting to the pre-2000 early-evening news model. Canada Now was last broadcast on February 16, 2007, replaced by the newly expanded CBC News at Six broadcasts on February 19. Ian Hanomansing was reassigned to co-host the new Vancouver local news program on CBUT, which briefly retained the Canada Now title before it was renamed CBC News: Vancouver in July 2007.

== See also ==
- CBC News
- CBC Television local newscasts
- Sixty Minutes (UK TV series), a defunct BBC newscast following a similar format.
