= Rosemary Barton Live =

Canadian television news program

- Genre: News; politics
- Presented by: Rosemary Barton
- Country of origin: Canada
- Original language: English

Production
- Production locations: CBC Ottawa Production Centre, Ottawa
- Camera setup: Multi-camera
- Running time: 90 minutes
- Production company: Canadian Broadcasting Corporation

Original release
- Network: CBC News Network; CBC Television
- Release: November 1, 2020 – present

Rosemary Barton Live is a Canadian television Sunday morning talk show, which premiered November 1, 2020, on CBC News Network and CBC Television. Hosted by Rosemary Barton, it is a live news and talk show covering political topics.

The series replaced The Weekly with Wendy Mesley; it is also a successor to The Sunday Scrum, a Sunday political news segment which aired on CBC News Network in the 2000s and 2010s. The Sunday Scrum was hosted by a variety of CBC journalists over the course of its run, including Nancy Wilson, Ben Chin, Carole MacNeil, Reshmi Nair, Asha Tomlinson and John Northcott, and continues to air as a segment within Rosemary Barton Live rather than a standalone program.

The series received two Canadian Screen Award nominations at the 10th Canadian Screen Awards in 2022, for Best Talk Program or Series and Best Host in a Talk or Entertainment News Series.
