= Aarti Pole =

Canadian journalist

- Born: St. John's, Newfoundland and Labrador, Canada
- Education: Ryerson University, University of British Columbia
- Occupations: Anchor, television broadcaster
- Employer: Canadian Broadcasting Corporation

Aarti Asha Pole is a Canadian journalist with the Canadian Broadcasting Corporation. She is currently a news anchor for CBC News Network.

== Biography ==
Pole is of Indian descent. She was the Washington Correspondent for Global National with Dawna Friesen. Prior to that, she was a reporter for CBC News Network and CBC News Toronto. She has been the news anchor of CBC News Vancouver and CBC News Vancouver weekend newscast at CBUT, CBC's Vancouver branch in British Columbia, Canada. She was also a reporter for CBC News Vancouver and hosted the weekend afternoons on CBC Radio One in Vancouver.

Pole was a reporter and backup anchor at CBWT until 2010. Currently, she is a weekend anchor and a breaking news host at CBC News Network.
