= Judy Maddren =

Canadian radio announcer

Judy Maddren is a Canadian radio announcer who worked primarily for CBC Radio.

She first joined CBC in 1972, and worked as a consumer affairs reporter; at that time, CBC was not hiring women as announcers. When this policy changed, in 1975, Maddren was the third woman to be hired.

From 1993 to 2009, she hosted or co-hosted CBC Radio's national morning newscast, World Report.

She is the sister-in-law of Peter Elliott.

On March 17, 2009, she announced that she was retiring from the CBC; her last broadcast was on World Report on March 27, 2009. She also guest hosted Rewind on CBC Radio One for Michael Enright along with fellow guest hosts and producers Marieke Meyer and Jeff Goodes.
