= Raed Hammoud =

Canadian journalist, host, and rapper (born 1987)

- Born: January 10, 1987 (age 39); Niamey, Niger
- Education: Université de Montréal
- Occupations: Journalist; television host; columnist; documentary filmmaker; rapper
- Known for: T'es où, Youssef ?, Les poussières de Daech

Raed Hammoud (born 10 January 1987) is a Quebec journalist, tv host, columnist, documentary filmmaker, and rapper of Lebanese origin.

== Biography ==
Born in Niamey, Niger, to Lebanese parents, Raed Hammoud grew up in Africa before settling in Quebec with his family in 1997, at the age of 9. He went on to study international studies before obtaining a master's degree in political science from the Université de Montréal.

== Career ==
Initially oriented toward a career in international development, Raed Hammoud joined Radio-Canada following an internship obtained after the cancellation of an overseas project, and went on to establish himself there professionally. He worked as a researcher on the program C'est bien meilleur le matin, before becoming a columnist and host, taking the helm of programs including Le Monde est à nous and Ce soir ou jamais.

In 2019, he co-hosted the debate program Zone franche on Télé-Québec alongside Isabelle Maréchal, dedicated to social issues and the exchange of ideas.

In 2026, he hosted the documentary series La guerre des cerveaux, examining digital technologies and their social and political impacts.

Raed Hammoud has also directed several documentaries, including T'es où, Youssef ?, on the topic of radicalization, and Les poussières de Daech. He hosted the series Immigrants de souche, filmed during the COVID-19 pandemic, in which he met immigrants settled in rural regions of Quebec. He has also participated in international projects, including the series Demain l'Afrique, devoted to the urban youth of the African continent.

Alongside his media work, Raed Hammoud pursues a music career under the stage name Sael. His productions address social, cultural, and identity issues, with the aim of offering different perspectives on immigration and contemporary societies.

== See also ==
- Lebanese diaspora
