= Paul Griffin (journalist) =

Australian journalist and communications executive (1947–2013)

- Born: 15 April 1947
- Died: 5 March 2013 (aged 65–66)
- Occupations: Journalist, news presenter, public relations executive, communications consultant
- Employer(s): 4ZR Roma, 4KQ Brisbane, Nine Network (QTQ-9), Hill & Knowlton, Griffin Communications
- Known for: Logie award winning newsreader who co-anchored National Nine News in Queensland
- Political party: Australian Democrats
- Awards: Logie Award - Most Popular Male Personality in Queensland (1979)
- Website: griffincommunications.com.au

Paul Anthony Griffin (15 April 1947 – 5 March 2013) was an Australian television and radio journalist, international public relations executive and communications consultant. He was a Logie Award-winning newsreader for National Nine News during the 1970s and 1980s. Griffin became one of Queensland's most recognisable television personalities and later established himself as a respected political and public relations strategist.

== Early life ==
Griffin was born in Brisbane, Queensland, on 15 April 1947, was the eldest of two siblings and grew up in Mackay. His father, John Patrick "Jack" Griffin (1918–1987), was a Second World War serviceman who enlisted in Brisbane in October 1943 and served in the Australian Army Pay Corps during WWII until his discharge in February 1946. Jack was born in the town of Winton, Queensland, educated at St Patrick's Christian Brothers College and died in Redcliffe in 1987. Griffin's mother, Thelma Violet Deakin Griffin (nee Hague), was born in Charters Towers in 1921, and died in Redcliffe where she was buried alongside Jack in 2015.

Having spent 11 years as a boarder student at St Brendan's College Yeppoon, Griffin graduated and undertook an eighteen-month stint working as a sugar chemist in the regional Queensland town of Bundaberg. He began his broadcasting career in the 1960s at major regional radio station 4ZR in Roma, Queensland, before moving to Brisbane's 4KQ, where he was a full time radio announcer until 1971.

== Early years at Nine Network ==
In 1972, Griffin joined Sir Frank Packer's Nine Network as a freelance journalist and news presenter for QTQ-9 (Channel Nine Queensland). His first major 6 pm newsreading assignment came during the 1974 Brisbane floods, when Nine's veteran usual 6 pm Queensland newsreader Don Seccombe became stranded in floodwaters while reporting from the field outside the Castlemaine Perkins XXXX Brewery in Milton. Griffin was placed unexpectedly in the 6 pm presenter's chair, a role he continued to occupy for several years to follow.

At the time, and for many years afterwards, QTQ-9 was the only Queensland commercial television station operating a continuous state-wide relay of its 6 pm news service over the Postmaster-General's Department (PMG) and later Telecom (Telstra) microwave network, enabling Brisbane-originated news bulletins to be broadcast in near real time to regional centres across most of Queensland and helping to build a large statewide audience.

Former Nine Network executive and the first person to appear on television ever in Queensland, Hugh Cornish, later recalled, “well you either made it or you didn’t — and he made it.” referring to Griffin's success at the station.

In 1974, Kerry Packer became Chairman and Chief Executive of Publishing and Broadcasting Limited (PBL), the parent company of the Nine Network, following the death of his father, Sir Frank Packer.

During the 1970s and 1980s, QTQ-9's National Nine News was the leading television news service in Queensland, frequently topping local television ratings and attracting advertising revenue contributing to the rising success of Packer's growing commercial television interests.

Griffin regularly anchored Nine's morning, afternoon and late-night bulletins and was the nighly co-anchor of Queensland's 6 pm weekday editions of National Nine News alongside Don Seccombe, a pairing later described by Nine as “the Nine News dream team of the 70s and 80s”.

This period in QTQ-9's history also saw significant investment in promotion and network branding, most notably the adoption of Nine's highly successful “Still the One” marketing campaign, which was licensed from the American Broadcasting Company (ABC) in the United States.

== 1977 Federal Election ==
Griffin was a senior member of the Australian Democrats and stood as a Senate candidate for Queensland in the 1977 Australian federal election, the party's first ever national political campaign in a tightly held political system between the Australian Labor Party, Liberal Party of Australia, and The Nationals.

Formed earlier that year under the leadership of former Liberal Party minister Don Chipp, the Australian Democrats positioned themselves as a new, centrist alternative focused on political integrity, social justice, better environmental protection and greater transparency in government.

The Australian Democrats, with the help of Griffin, coined the political slogan “keep the bastards honest”. which became closely associated with the party's broad public appeal and growth of electoral success.

Running as part of the Australian Senate Group G, 30-year-old Griffin received 96,377 first-preference votes (8.77 per cent) in Queensland, contributing to the party's strong statewide performance as it began to establish itself as a new force of competition in the Australian Senate.

Griffin also campaigned for several social causes including for minority groups and greater representation of Aboriginal people and women in television, telling reporters in 1977 that “television is an incredibly influential industry” and should reflect society more broadly.

He remained a member of the Australian Democrats beyond the 1977 election and later coordinated the party's 1980 federal campaign in Queensland, which saw Democrat candidate Michael Macklin successfully elected to the Senate, beginning a parliamentary career that would eventually include service as the party's Deputy Leader.

Griffin also successfully coordinated the electoral campaigns of several other Queensland and Australian political figures, some of whom remain sitting Members of Parliament in 2025.

== 1979 Logie Awards ==
Griffin's popularity with Queensland audiences culminated at the 21st TV Week Logie Awards, where he won a Logie at the age of 32 for Most Popular Male Personality for his "huge ratings in Queensland".

He was photographed at the ceremony with Nine Network colleague and Hey Hey it's Saturday star Jackie MacDonald alongside international guest Robin Williams, who was then star of Mork & Mindy.

The 1979 ceremony, hosted by Bert Newton at the Hilton Hotel in Melbourne, now Pullman on the Park opposite the Melbourne Cricket Ground, is also famously remembered for an exchange with Muhammad Ali, after Newton used the phrase “I like the boy”, which in the United States had racial connotations. Ali replied, “Did you say boy or Roy?” before the incident was defused.

During his Logie Awards acceptance speech, Paul Griffin said:

“Terry mentioned that his news service in West Australia covers two-thirds of the state. I’m rather proud of the fact that National Nine News in Brisbane covers all of the state, every town, and every city, and as an expression of your support, I accept this Logie. I accept this Logie with a great deal of pleasure. It is a moment in my life that I will always treasure.”

The same evening QTQ-9 also won the first individual news Logie by any Queensland commercial television station.

== Later years at Nine Network ==
While presenting the news, Griffin also worked across the promotions, programming and production units of QTQ-9, taking on several other roles within the station, including a short time spent as the actor of Humphrey B. Bear. Following Griffin's death, Hugh Cornish recalled, “He might have been a newsreader, but you could end up in a comedy skit in a variety show. You ended up anywhere in those days.”

Throughout the 1980s, Griffin was regarded by many as the natural successor to Don Seccombe, particularly during periods when National Nine News ratings at 6pm declined. In response, Nine introduced several programming changes, including having Griffin anchor local and statewide late-night bulletins and extended Saturday editions, as well as making adjustments to the daily news schedule. However, in 1983 as part of a change of local newsroom leadership and a competitive news media landscape, Nine successfully lured Frank Warrick from Network Seven to co-anchor with Seccombe, a move that gradually shifted Griffin out of the spotlight.

Come 1987 and Publishing & Broadcasting Limited (PBL) had sold the Nine Network to Alan Bond's Bond Media for $1.05 billion which coincided with Griffin's departure from Nine Network.

For more than 50 years his portrait has remained on display in the main reception of Channel 9 Queensland's studios on Sir Samuel Griffith Drive, Mount Coot-tha.

== Executive career ==
Following his departure from Nine Network in 1987, Griffin joined the global public relations agency Hill & Knowlton as the executive responsible for the firm's Queensland operations, working under the direction of President and Chief Executive Officer Robert L. Dilenschneider, who was based at the firm's New York headquarters. Griffin's six-year term coincided with a period of significant corporate and governmental reform in Queensland, during which his services were sought on high-profile media and policy matters.

== Griffin Communications ==
In 1992, Griffin established Paul Griffin Communications, later known as Griffin Communications.

Griffin's services spanned corporate communications strategy, crisis management, media training, speech presentation, and coordination of political and electoral campaigns. Griffin also worked as a guest lecturer with the Public Relations Institute of Australia (Queensland Division) and in Mass Communications at the University of Southern Queensland, and was a member of the Australian Institute of Management.

== Philanthropy ==
Griffin supported several causes, charitable organisations and individuals.

He was an early advocate for marriage equality in Australia through his political, media and community work with the Gay and Lesbian Welfare Association of Queensland (GLWA). Griffin began working with the GLWA in the early 1990s, at a time when homosexuality had only recently been decriminalised in Queensland.

His primary focus was to reduce the number of gay and lesbian people dying by suicide through promotion of the association's telephone counselling and information services to people across the state through traditional media and public directories.

Griffin also maintained a strong interest in social causes relating to human rights, journalistic ethics and standards, voluntary assisted dying, and the response to institutional child abuse of boys aged between 12 and 16 at a facility in Beaudesert established by the De La Salle Brothers in 1961, which closed in 2001.

He frequently compered community and not-for-profit events throughout Queensland, including the Young Achiever Awards, fundraisers and community sporting events.

== Personal life ==
Once described by The Courier-Mail as Channel Nine's “most eligible bachelor”, Griffin later married Ansett flight attendant Lesley Hughes at St Francis College Chapel in Milton, Brisbane. They had raised three sons before separating several years later. Griffin and Hughes first met in 1979 at the wedding of mutual friends, married in 1982, and remained close friends until his death.

== Death ==
Griffin died in Brisbane on 5 March 2013, aged 65, following an extended period of ill health. At the time of his death, Nine News Queensland newsreader Andrew Lofthouse described him as “one of the most successful newsreaders ever to grace these studios,” referring to the Mount Coot-tha studios where Griffin had presented for many years. Nine veteran newsreader Bruce Paige said, “He was a lovely bloke... and much loved by the Nine viewing family.”

Griffin was survived by his three sons, Daniel, James and Ben.
