= Pamela Wallin Live =

Pamela Wallin Live is a Canadian interview series that aired on CBC Newsworld from 1995 to 1999. It was hosted by Pamela Wallin.

Following her highly publicized firing from the CBC's Prime Time News in 1995, Wallin formed her own production company and launched the series. Instead of reporting or anchoring the news, Pamela Wallin Live featured Wallin interviewing newsmakers, celebrities and other figures in a format similar to CNN's Larry King Live.

The show quickly proved to be one of Newsworld's most popular offerings, and in some seasons was repeated the following afternoon on the CBC's main network as well.

In 1998, Newsworld moved the series to a different time slot, and the show no longer aired live. Its title was changed at that time to simply Pamela Wallin.

In 1999, Wallin moved the series to CTV's new specialty channel TalkTV, where it became Pamela Wallin's TalkTV. It aired there until 2002, when Wallin accepted a diplomatic posting as Canada's Consul General in New York City.
