= Russ Germain =

Canadian broadcaster (1947–2009)

Russ Germain

Russ Germain (1947 – February 2, 2009) was a Canadian broadcaster who worked for CBC Radio from 1973 to 2002. He was best known as anchor of the flagship news programs World Report and The World at Six.

He was born in New Liskeard, Ontario, and educated at the University of Manitoba. He worked in private commercial radio in Winnipeg and Edmonton before joining the CBC as a local newsreader in Saskatoon in 1974, and became host of The World at Six in 1983.

In 1990, Germain was made the CBC's broadcast language adviser, in which role he provided suggested pronunciations of obscure vocabulary for other announcers.
