= Martina Fitzgerald (Canadian journalist) =

Canadian radio journalist

Martina Fitzgerald is a Canadian radio journalist, who is the current anchor of CBC Radio One's news program The World This Weekend.

She was born in Brockville, and grew up in Kingston, Ontario.
