= Don Newman (broadcaster) =

Canadian journalist

Don Newman OC
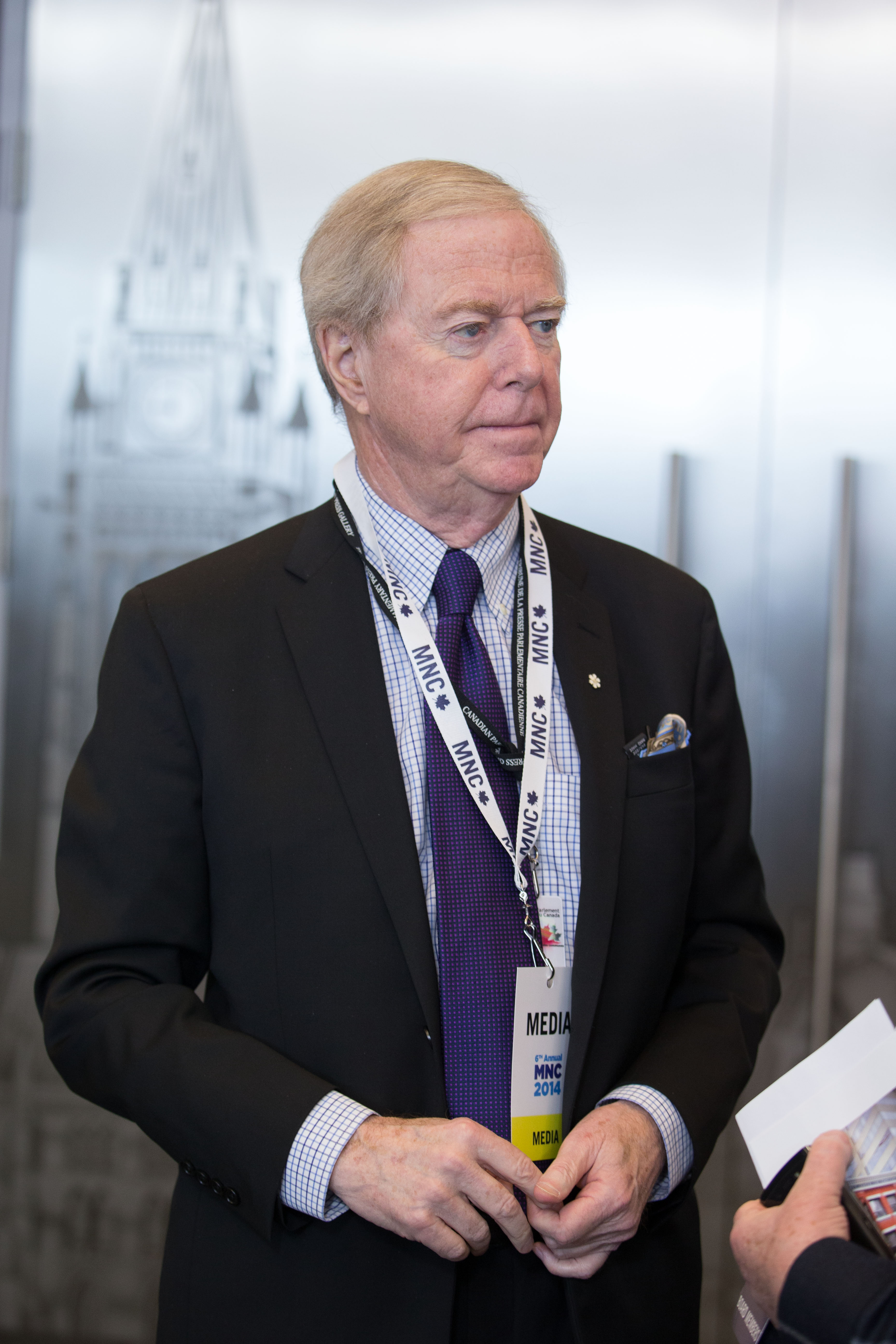
- Don Newman in 2014
- Born: 28 October 1940 (age 86); Winnipeg, Manitoba, Canada
- Occupation: Broadcast journalist
- Years active: 1972–2009
- Employer(s): CTV (1972-1976); CBC (1976-2009)
- Spouse(s): Audrey Ann (d. c. 1995); Shannon Day (present)

Donald Kenneth Newman, OC (born 28 October 1940) is a retired senior parliamentary editor for CBC Television who also hosted CBC Newsworld's daily politics program CBC News: Politics. Newman is known for his signature introductory phrase to the viewer "Welcome to the Broadcast", in which he enunciates the first syllable of the last word more slowly than the rest of the greeting. The phrase became the title of his memoir, published in 2013.

== Career ==
Born in Winnipeg, Manitoba. Educated at Highgate School, London, UK, and University of Winnipeg. He began his newspaper career at the Winnipeg Tribune, moved to CJAY TV in Winnipeg, and CKCK Radio and TV in Regina. He returned to print with the Winnipeg Free Press and recruited to the Winnipeg Tribune as political reporter and columnist. In 1967, he moved to The Globe and Mail in Toronto at its Queen's Park bureau and in 1969 to Ottawa's parliamentary bureau where his coverage included the FLQ crisis. He moved back to television in 1971 with CTV parliamentary bureau and was the network's Washington correspondent from 1972 until 1976. In 1976, he moved to CBC TV as its Washington correspondent until 1979. He served two years as the Edmonton CBC's Western correspondent covering the national energy program and constitutional talks before returning to the parliamentary bureau in 1981. From 1981 to 1993, he was the host of CBC's This Week in Parliament. In 1989, he began to host daily political programs Capital Report and live coverage on CBC's new Newsworld channel (CBC News Network).

During his time with the CBC he anchored major political events that affected Canadians on CBC Newsworld. Some of them include:

- Canadian federal elections
- Leadership conventions
- Opening of a new session of Parliament
- Visits by world leaders, notably, American presidents
  - During George W. Bush's visit to Canada in 2004, Newman appeared on MSNBC
- Elections in the United States, including U.S. presidential elections
- State of the Union addresses by American presidents
- State funeral of former U.S. president Ronald Reagan
- National Remembrance Day ceremonies
  - During the coverage of the state funeral, Newman got expert help in the commentary from former ambassador Allan Gotlieb, Canadian ambassador to Washington in Reagan's day
- U.S. presidential inaugurations

During major political events in the United States, he anchored coverage of it from the Canadian Embassy in Washington. The only events he did not anchor from Washington were the State of the Union addresses and the state funeral of Reagan. He anchored coverage of both those events from the CBC Ottawa bureau, where his daily politics program is based.

In 1998, Newman became the first recipient of the Charles Lynch Award for his outstanding coverage of national issues. In 1999, he was made a Member of the Order of Canada. On 14 September 2007, at a special convocation honoring the 40th Anniversary of his alma mater, the University of Winnipeg conferred on him an Honorary Doctor of Laws degree.

On 2 May 2009, Newman's retirement from CBC was announced.

Don Newman made his final "Politics" broadcast on 19 June 2009 and retired at the end of June 2009. Newman stated that he would occasionally write cbc.ca articles, and file reports on TV. He returned to CBC (briefly) for the 2011 federal election coverage.

He was a founder of the Science Media Centre of Canada.

== Publications ==
- Welcome to the Broadcast: a Memoir was published in 2013 by HarperCollins.
