= CBC News Network =

Canadian English-language news channel

- Type: Broadcasting news, discussions
- Country: Canada
- Broadcast area: National

Programming
- Language: English
- Picture format: 720p HDTV (downscaled to letterboxed 480i for the SDTV feed)

Ownership
- Owner: Canadian Broadcasting Corporation
- Sister channels: CBC Television; Ici Radio-Canada Télé; Ici RDI; Ici ARTV; Ici Explora; CBC North

History
- Launched: July 31, 1989; 37 years ago
- Former names: CBC Newsworld (1989–2009)

Links
- Website: cbc.ca/cbcnewsnetwork

Availability

Streaming media
- CBC Gem: Over-the-top TV
- RiverTV: Over-the-top TV

CBC News Network (formerly CBC Newsworld) is a Canadian English-language specialty news channel owned by the Canadian Broadcasting Corporation (CBC). It is Canada's first all-news channel, and the world's third-oldest television service of this nature (after CNN in the United States, and Sky News in the United Kingdom).

CBC News Network is funded by cable subscriber fees and commercial advertising, unlike the CBC's main television network, and it cannot directly receive operational funds from the corporation's public funding allotment. Nonetheless, the network benefits from synergies with other CBC services; such as the ability to share reporters and programs with the main network.

CBC News Network's French-language counterpart is Ici RDI, also owned by the CBC (or, Société Radio-Canada in French).

== Revenue ==
According to the 2014 "Communications Monitoring Report" by the Canadian Radio-television and Telecommunications Commission (CRTC), CBC News Network in 2014 had 11.3 million subscribers and a revenue of $86.7 million.

== History ==
With CNN and CNN International already being widely available in Canada during the 1980s and beyond, private and state-owned Canadian broadcasters began to apply for a licence for a similar 24-hour news service in Canada. In 1987, the Canadian Radio-television and Telecommunications Commission (CRTC) awarded a licence to the CBC.

The launch of the CBC's 24-hour news service was delayed several times: first when Allarcom, who had filed a competing application for an all-news channel, chose to appeal the CRTC decision; second, when the federal cabinet issued a directive to the CBC to revise its service plan for the network to include private commercial broadcasters and to launch a parallel French language service; and lastly, when cable companies were reluctant to add the service just five months after a similar launch of numerous other channels.

CBC Newsworld finally began broadcasting on 31 July 1989 from several regional studios in Halifax, Toronto, Winnipeg and Calgary, becoming Canada's first all-news channel. (As of 2017, there are production studios in Vancouver, Toronto and Halifax.)

In the 1990s, the channel also aired repeats of CBC Television's political sketch comedy series This Hour Has 22 Minutes and Royal Canadian Air Farce, but these were discontinued in 2001 after a CRTC directive that the shows did not qualify as news programming.

In 2000, because of a fee dispute between Persona (then known as Regional Cablesystems; later acquired by Eastlink) and the CBC, CBC News Network was dropped by a number of Persona-owned cable systems. Thereafter, while CBC News Network was sometimes thought to be a mandatory basic cable channel, these cable systems did not carry the channel at all during much of the 2000s.

=== Newsworld International ===
Some of CBC News Network's programming also aired on the now-defunct Newsworld International, an American cable news network co-owned by the CBC and the Power Corporation of Canada. CBC Newsworld (as it was then known) produced some programming for Newsworld International, and scheduled programming from other news networks like Britain's BBC World, which did not air on the Canadian channel.

Soon after, Newsworld International was sold to USA Networks in 2000, then to Vivendi Universal Entertainment in 2001, and then to Al Gore and Joel Hyatt in 2004. Newsworld continued to provide the network's programming until Gore and Hyatt launched their own network, Current TV, on 1 August 2005. In 2013, the channel was sold again to the Al Jazeera Media Network and became Al Jazeera America on 20 August 2013.

=== 2009 re-launch ===
In December 2008, it was reported that the CBC planned to revamp Newsworld in 2009, as the result of a strategic review and market survey. The CBC found that consumer awareness of CBC Newsworld was lower in comparison to other specialty channels, and there was a perception that the CBC broke stories too slowly. Tentative plans also called for the revamped channel to have more prominent displays of news headlines and weather reports.

On 21 October 2009, it was announced that CBC Newsworld would be renamed CBC News Network on October 26 as part of a larger re-launch of the CBC News division. A new lineup of programs was introduced to the network, with a greater emphasis towards live news coverage. New programs included CBC News Now (the channel's rolling news coverage), Power & Politics, The Lang and O'Leary Exchange (a business news program hosted by Amanda Lang and Dragons' Den-investor Kevin O'Leary), and Connect with Mark Kelley.

=== CBC News Network HD ===
In January 2009, the CBC launched an HD simulcast of CBC News Network (then CBC Newsworld) called CBC Newsworld HD. The channel was renamed CBC News Network HD on 26 October 2009 to coincide with the renaming of CBC Newsworld to CBC News Network. The HD feed has been confirmed at 720p resolution on Shaw Cable after it was added to the lineup in 2014. It is available through all major television providers in the country.

== Programming ==
CBC News Network used to air a number of magazine-style programs, along with hourly news updates. The network has moved from that style of programming to focusing solely on live-news and documentary programs, including The Passionate Eye and Rough Cuts—both of which used to be hosted by Michaëlle Jean—and Politics—a political affairs program hosted by Don Newman that aired twice daily. The Hour with George Stroumboulopoulos was launched in 2005 in an attempt to attract younger viewers; similar news-oriented talk shows, such as Pamela Wallin Live, CounterSpin, Face Off, and Benmergui Live, also aired on the network in the 1990s.

The network's daytime schedule consists of live rolling news coverage, branded as CBC Newsroom (formerly known as CBC News Now), which airs weekdays from 10:00 a.m. to 4:00 p.m. ET, Saturdays from 6:00 a.m. to 5:30 p.m. ET, and Sundays from 6:00 a.m. to 4:00 p.m. ET (with a two-hour break from 10:00 a.m. to 12:00 p.m. ET). Instead of producing a separate noon-hour program, most CBC Television stations simulcast CBC News Network from 12:00 to 1:00 pm local time, with an "L-bar" showing local news and weather headlines.

Power & Politics airs live from 5:00 to 7:00 p.m. ET. From 7:00 to 9:00 p.m. on weekdays, CBC News Network airs Hanomansing Tonight.

Beginning with the Atlantic Time Zone airing at 9:00 p.m. ET, The National—CBC News' flagship nightly newscast—runs live until 2:00 a.m. ET and then on a loop until 6:00 a.m. ET the following morning.

Other original programming that appear on CBC News Network includes:

- Marketplace — Canadian consumer watchdog series
- The Fifth Estate — investigative documentary newsmagazine series
- The Passionate Eye — documentary television series
- Rosemary Barton Live — live weekly program on political news and issues, hosted by CBC's chief political correspondent Rosemary Barton.
- The Investigators — hosted by Diana Swain

Since 2021, the channel has also simulcast the first hour of CBC Radio One's news phone-in show Cross Country Checkup on Sunday afternoons.

In 2023, CBC announced several programming changes, including news hosts, for both weekday and weekend programs. Among the changes was an official name change to daytime and weekend rolling news programming to ‘CBC Newsroom’. ‘CBC Rundown with Andrew Nichols’ was also ended, in favour of an expanded two-hour Canada Tonight.

In February 2025, the network announced that Canada Tonight would be replaced with a new two-hour show, Hanomansing Tonight, hosted by Ian Hanomansing from Vancouver. The show began on February 18.

David Common became the host of CBC Morning Live on February 2, 2026, following the retirement of longtime host Heather Hiscox in November 2025.

CBC News Network programming, as of February 2025
Program	Day	Time (ET)	Anchor/host	Description
Weekday programming
CBC Morning Live	Mon – Fri	6 – 10 am	David Common	
CBC Newsroom with...	Mon – Fri	10 am – 1 pm	Aarti Pole	live rolling news
CBC Newsroom with...	Mon – Fri	1 – 5 pm	Andrew Nichols	live rolling news
Power & Politics	Mon – Fri	5 – 7 pm	David Cochrane	news & political talk show
Hanomansing Tonight	Mon – Fri	7 – 9 pm	Ian Hanomansing	news & political talk show
All-week programming
The National	Mon – Thurs	12 – 6 am; 9 – 11:59 pm	Adrienne Arsenault	news broadcast
The National	Fri	12 – 6 am; 9 – 11:59 pm	Ian Hanomansing	news broadcast
The National	Sat	12 – 6 am	Ian Hanomansing	news broadcast
The National	Sun	9 – 11:59 pm	Ian Hanomansing	news broadcast
Weekend programming
CBC Newsroom with....	Sat	6 – 11 am	Marianne Dimain	live rolling news
CBC Newsroom with....	Sat	11 am – 4 pm	Natasha Fatah	live rolling news
CBC Newsroom with....	Sun	6 – 10 am	Marianne Dimain	live rolling news
CBC Newsroom with....	Sun	12 – 4 pm	Natasha Fatah	live rolling news
Rosemary Barton Live	Sun	10 am – 12 pm; 5 – 7 pm	Rosemary Barton	weekly program on political news and issues
Cross Country Checkup	Sun	4 – 5 pm	Ian Hanomansing	Weekly call-in news show simulcast from CBC Radio One
Marketplace	Sat	5:30 – 6 pm; 9:30 – 10 pm; 11:30 pm – 12:00 am	Asha Tomlinson, Charlsie Agro and David Common	Canadian consumer watchdog series
CBC Newsroom with...	Sat	4 – 5:30, 6 – 6:30 pm, 9 – 9:30 pm, 11 – 11:30 pm	Deana Sumanac-Johnson	live news
The Fifth Estate	Sat – Sun	7 – 8 pm	Bob McKeown, Mark Kelley, Habiba Nosheen, and Gillian Findlay	investigative documentary newsmagazine series
CBC Docs POV	Sat	10 – 11 pm	N/A	point-of-view documentary series
CBC Docs POV	Sun	1 – 2 am	N/A	point-of-view documentary series
At Issue	Sat	6:30 – 7 pm	Rosemary Barton; Chantal Hébert, Andrew Coyne and Althia Raj (panelists)	political panel show
At Issue	Sun	12:30 – 1 am; 2:30 – 3 am;	Rosemary Barton; Chantal Hébert, Andrew Coyne and Althia Raj (panelists)	political panel show
CBC News Network	Sun	8 – 9 pm	Deanna Sumanac-Johnson	live news
The Nature of Things	Sat	8 – 9 pm	David Suzuki	popular science program
The Nature of Things	Sun	4 – 5 am	David Suzuki	popular science program
The Nature of Things	Mon	2 – 3 am	David Suzuki	popular science program

== Anchors ==
=== Current ===
- Peter Armstrong
- Adrienne Arsenault
- Rosemary Barton
- David Common
- Natasha Fatah
- Jennifer Hall
- Ian Hanomansing
- Colleen Jones
- Carole MacNeil
- Andrew Nichols
- Scott Peterson
- Aarti Pole

=== Former ===
Original members of the first Newsworld anchor team:

- George Boyd
- Whit Fraser
- Beth Gaines
- Jane Gilbert
- Paul Griffin

Other former anchors:

- Dave Brindle
- Kim Brunhuber — now with The National
- Bill Cameron — deceased (2005)
- Bruce Dowbiggin — 1990s
- Harry Forestell — later host of CBC News: New Brunswick
- Dawna Friesen — now with Global National
- Tom Harrington — later host of The World This Hour on CBC Radio One
- Heather Hiscox
- Michaëlle Jean — now former Governor General of Canada
- Vassy Kapelos — moved to CTV News in November 2022 to become the host of Power Play and Question Period.
- Mark Kelley
- Nil Köksal — became host of World Report, CBC News Toronto Weekend, and CBC Toronto News at 11 (Sunday), currently host of As It Happens since July 2022
- Amanda Lang — eponymous anchor of The Lang and O'Leary Exchange; now host of Bloomberg North on Bloomberg TV Canada
- Anne-Marie Mediwake — now CTV Morning Live
- Suhana Meharchand
- Jordi Morgan — official for the Canadian Federation of Independent Business and metro organiser for the Progressive Conservative Party of Nova Scotia
- Reshmi Nair
- Don Newman — retired
- John Northcott - now weekend anchor of World Report on CBC Radio One
- Anne Petrie
- Kathleen Petty — current host of Ottawa Morning on CBC Radio Ottawa
- Lorne Saxberg — died in snorkelling accident in Thailand
- Sarika Sehgal — moved to CTV News Channel; now deceased
- Alison Smith — now retired; former co-anchor of The World at Six on CBC Radio One with Bernie McNamee
- Evan Solomon — also former host of Question Period on CTV News Channel
- George Stroumboulopoulos — now freelance
- Sheldon Turcott — retired; deceased as of 2000
- Nancy Wilson — retired
- Michael Serapio — once CPAC host, now CTV News National Correspondent
- Ginella Massa
- Hannah Thibedeau
- Travis Dhanraj — resigned

== Logos ==
2001–2009 (CBC Newsworld)

Oct 2009–Mar 2016

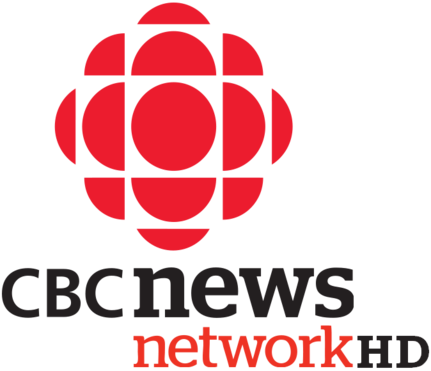
Oct 2009–Mar 2016 (HD)

2016–2021

2016–2021 (HD; seen only in channel lineups)
