= Ian Hanomansing =

Canadian journalist

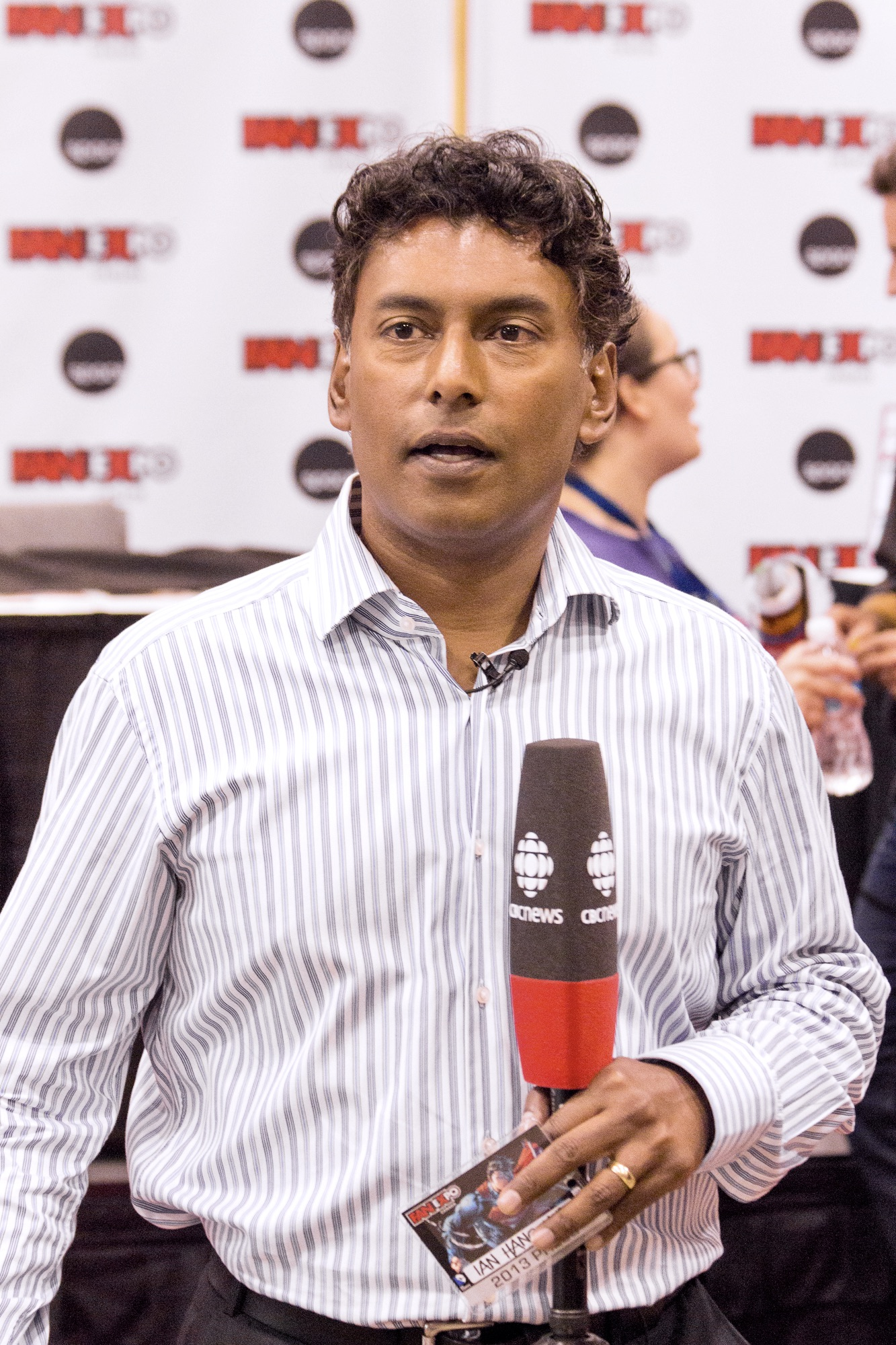
- Hanomansing in 2013
- Born: 1962 or 1963 (age 63–64); Port of Spain, Trinidad and Tobago
- Education: Dalhousie Law School, Mount Allison University
- Occupation: Journalist
- Employer: Canadian Broadcasting Corporation

Ian Harvey Hanomansing (born 1962) is a Trinidadian-Canadian television journalist with the Canadian Broadcasting Corporation (CBC). He formerly hosted CBC News Network Vancouver on CBC News Network, and reports for CBC Television's nightly newscast, The National.

On August 1, 2017, Hanomansing was named a co-anchor of The National, and currently anchors the show on Fridays and Sundays. He also served as interim host of CBC Radio One's weekly call-in show Cross Country Checkup from 2020 to 2022, while regular host Duncan McCue was on sabbatical; Hanomansing was named permanent host of the program in 2022.

In 2025, Hanomansing became the host of a nightly news program, Hanomansing Tonight, which began on February 18 on CBC News Network.

== Early life ==
Hanomansing was born in Port of Spain, Trinidad and Tobago to Indian parents. He grew up in Sackville, New Brunswick with parents Eunice and Harvey, along with his sister Ria. Hanomansing got his first job coming out of high school in 1979 at a radio station in Amherst, Nova Scotia. He attended Mount Allison University for his undergraduate education and graduated in 1983 with a degree in political science and sociology. Hanomansing studied law at Dalhousie Law School and graduated in 1986.

== Broadcasting career ==
Hanomansing's broadcast media career began at CKDH in Amherst, Nova Scotia in the summer after his graduation, followed by work at CKCW in Moncton, New Brunswick and at CHNS in nearby Halifax, Nova Scotia. In 1986, he joined the Canadian Broadcasting Corporation. He worked for CBC bureaus in the Maritimes and Toronto, Ontario before moving to Vancouver, where he was a network reporter and hosted the now-defunct programs Pacific Rim Report, Foreign Assignment, and Times 7 (a joint venture with The New York Times) and also hosted a summer series on CBC Radio One, Feeling the Heat.

From 2000 to 2007, he was the anchor of the national segment of the defunct newscast Canada Now; following that program's cancellation, he was the co-anchor of CBC News: Vancouver, CBUT's supper hour newscast, from 2007 to 2010. He returned to his former role as network reporter for The National in 2010; and from 2012 to 2017, Hanomansing hosted CBC News Now with Ian Hanomansing, which was broadcast live from CBC Vancouver on weeknights. On August 1, 2017, he was named as one of four new co-hosts of The National, CBC's flagship news broadcast alongside Adrienne Arsenault, Rosemary Barton and Andrew Chang. In 2020, he was named the Friday and Sunday anchor of the programme.

Hanomansing has developed and hosted a series of innovative live news specials including "Downtown Drugs", in November 1998, from Vancouver's Downtown Eastside during a public health emergency declared after a high number of fatal overdoses. In March 2005, "Crime on the Streets" was broadcast, in part, from Stoney Mountain Institution in Manitoba. It is believed to be the only live national news special from a Canadian federal penal institution. It won a national Justicia Award for Excellence in Legal Reporting, as well as a Jack Webster Award.

In 2006, Hanomansing also designed Big League Manager, an NHL-licensed board game. His game was voted a "Best Bet" by the Canadian Toy Testing Council.

== Awards and honours ==
Hanomansing received an honorary degree, Doctor of Laws honoris causa (LLD), from Mount Allison University in 2003. On November 28, 2008, Hanomansing won the Gemini Award for Best News Anchor, beating Kevin Newman and Peter Mansbridge. In 2010, Hanomansing was one of the recipients of the Top 25 Canadian Immigrant Awards presented by Canadian Immigrant Magazine. In March 2016, he won the Canadian Screen Award for Best National News Anchor over Peter Mansbridge, Lisa LaFlamme and Heather Hiscox.
