= Rassi Nashalik =

Canadian journalist

Rassi Nashalik CM
- Born: Nunavut
- Citizenship: Canadian
- Occupation: newscaster

Rassi Nashalik is a retired Canadian journalist who was formerly the host of Igalaaq, a CBC North newscast in the Inuit language of Inuktitut. In August 2021, she was inducted into the CBC News Hall of Fame.

== Early life ==
Nashalik was born on a small island off of Baffin Island in the territory of Nunavut. She was one of twelve siblings. For the first ten years of her life, she lived a traditional lifestyle with her family, playing outdoors and using dog sleds for transportation. At age ten, she was sent to residential schools in Pangnirtung and Churchill.

== News career ==
Before working at CBC, Nashalik worked with the Language Bureau for 13 years. She then saw a newspaper ad seeking an Inuktitut-speaking host for a news show. She applied and got the job, starting Igalaaq in 1995. During her tenure, she promoted the hiring of Indigenous people at the station and encouraged younger Inuit to speak Inuktitut. In 2014, she retired from newscasting.

In 2022, she was named the winner of the Academy of Canadian Cinema and Television's Gordon Sinclair Award for distinguished achievement in journalism at the 10th Canadian Screen Awards.

== Post-CBC work ==
As an Inuk elder, she became an elder-in-residence at the University of Alberta's School of Public Health in 2018. She also co-founded a wellness camp in Yellowknife for First Nations people. In 2021, she was inducted into the CBC News Hall of Fame.

She was made a Member of the Order of Canada on December 31, 2025.
