= Nil Köksal =

Canadian journalist

Nil Köksal is a Turkish-born Canadian radio and television journalist, serving as primary host of As It Happens on CBC Radio One. Previously, she was the weekday anchor of the radio network's World Report.

Köksal has worked for the Canadian Broadcasting Corporation since 2001, and has been a member of the CBC News: Morning team since November 2005. She graduated from the University of British Columbia with a bachelor's degree and from Ryerson University with a Bachelor of Applied Arts in journalism. She was born in Istanbul, Turkey and raised in both Ontario and Vancouver.

In 2013, she won the Canadian Screen Award for Best Local Breaking News Reportage at the 1st Canadian Screen Awards, for her coverage of the death of Mariam Makhniashvili.
