= Ginella Massa =

Canadian television journalist (born 1987)

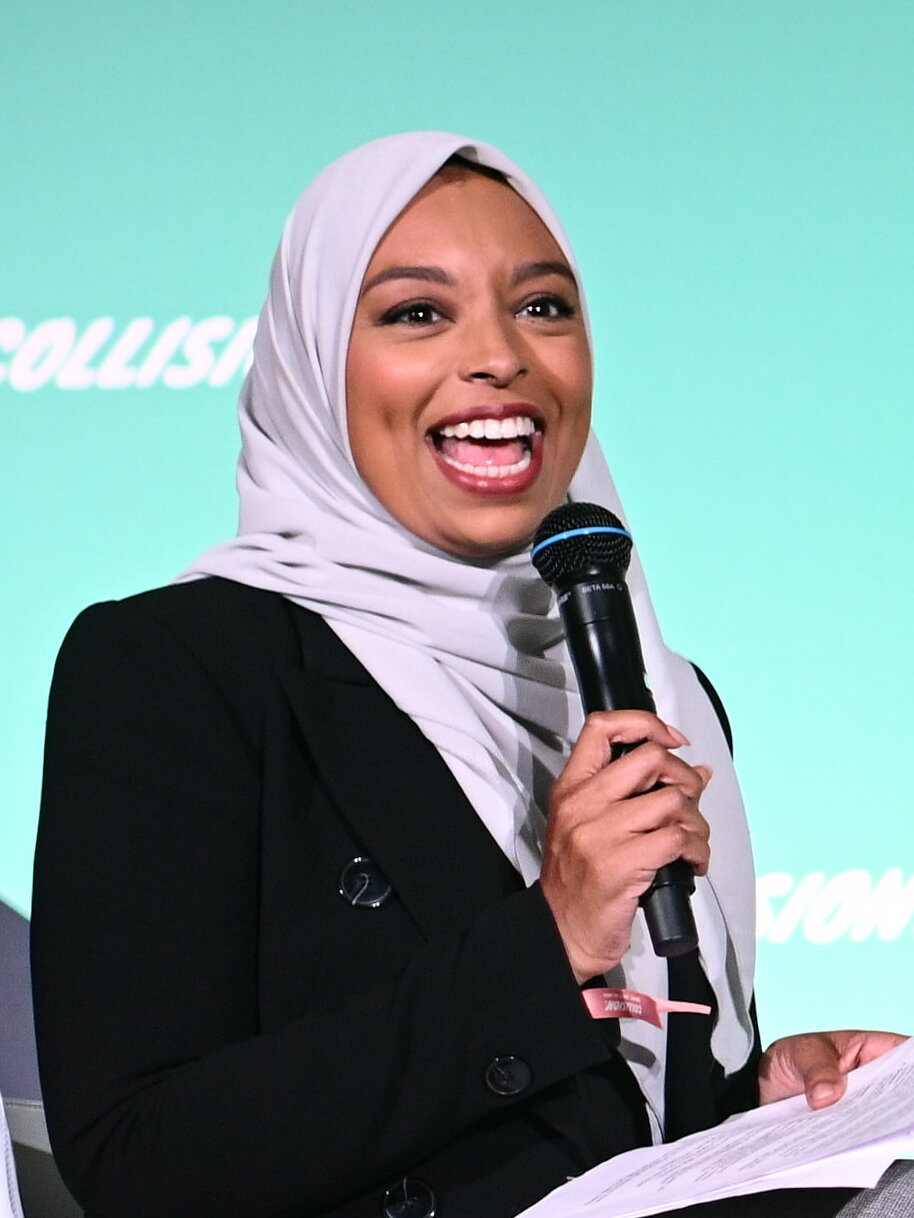
- Massa in 2024
- Born: January 29, 1987 (age 39); Panama
- Occupation: Journalist
- Website: www.massamedia.ca

Ginella Massa (born January 29, 1987) is a Canadian television journalist, and the CEO of Massa Media and Communication Inc — a boutique media consulting firm. An Afro-Latina Muslim reporter and anchor, she became North America's first hijab-wearing television reporter in 2015, and the first news anchor in hijab when she anchored the 11 p.m. newscast for CityNews on CITY-DT in Toronto, Ontario, on November 17, 2016.

== Life and career ==
An honors graduate of York University and Seneca College, she has worked both behind-the-scenes and on-air for local and national Canadian news outlets since 2010, including CTV News, CFRB and Rogers Television, and has been published in The Globe and Mail and the National Post.

In 2020, the Canadian Broadcasting Corporation announced that Massa would join the network as host of a prime-time show on CBC News Network and a special correspondent for The National. Her show, Canada Tonight, premiered on January 11, 2021, on CBC News Network. In October 2022, Massa went on maternity leave to care for her newborn daughter, leading Dwight Drummond to become the temporary host of Canada Tonight for the next year.

In July 2023, Massa announced that she would not be returning to CBC News. Travis Dhanraj succeeded Massa as the permanent host of Canada Tonight in January 2024.

== Personal life ==
Massa married her husband in 2018 in Toronto.

In 2019, she had a pancreaticoduodenectomy to remove a mass from her pancreas.
