= Suhana Meharchand =

Canadian journalist

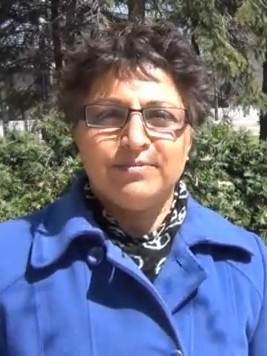
Meharchand in 2013

Suhana Meharchand is a Canadian retired journalist who was most recently a CBC News Network anchor and host of CBC News Now.

== Early life ==
Meharchand was born in Durban, South Africa, and raised in Toronto, Ontario, Canada. Meharchand is a graduate of broadcast journalism from Ryerson University. Her career in journalism was inspired by an uncle who ran an underground newspaper in her native South Africa.

== Career ==
Meharchand's first jobs as a journalist were at CHCH-TV, a TV station in Hamilton, Ontario and at CBET in Windsor, Ontario. She later moved to Ottawa, where she spent three years as a general reporter and weekend anchor at CJOH-TV, a CTV affiliate.

From September 1987 to July 1989, Meharchand was host and producer of What's New, CBC-TV's national news and current affairs program for young people.

She subsequently became the anchor of the Saturday Evening News broadcast in the Toronto-London-Windsor region.

In September 1995, she was appointed anchor of the CBC Evening News on CBLT in Toronto. Meharchand replaced Bill Cameron who had moved to Halifax to anchor CBC Newsworld's morning telecast. In September 2000, following the cancellation of CBC Evening News, Meharchand moved on to anchor news broadcasts on CBC Newsworld. She later became the host of Saturday Report, CBC's national weekend news program.

Meharchand has received two Gemini Award nominations for her work, and has won several international awards for documentary work, including awards from the Columbus International Film & Video Festival and the New York Film and TV Festival. She is the recipient of a Paul Harris Fellowship awarded by Rotary International and an Honorary Member of the Canadian Women's Foundation.

She retired from CBC News on September 30, 2022, after a 36-year career.

== Personal life ==
Meharchand is of Indian ancestry. She was married to federal politician and former broadcaster Adam Vaughan, and she had one of her three children with him. In 2016, she announced she was diagnosed with breast cancer.

Meharchand actively supports Performers for Literacy, Gems of Hope, the Redwood Shelter for Women and Children, the Canadian Paraplegic Association, The Hospital for Sick Children and the Princess Margaret Breast Cancer Centre.
