= Connect with Mark Kelley =

Canadian news talk show

- Presented by: Mark Kelley
- Country of origin: Canada
- Original language: English
- No. of episodes: N/A

Production
- Running time: 60 minutes

Original release
- Network: CBC News Network (2009–2012)
- Release: October 26, 2009 – June 22, 2012

Connect with Mark Kelley was a Canadian news talk show, which aired from 2009 to 2012 on CBC News Network. Hosted by Mark Kelley, the show originally aired lived from 7 p.m. to 9 p.m. eastern time on weeknights, and then was shortened to an 8 p.m. to 9 p.m. air time, after the creation of The Lang and O'Leary Exchange. The show's team also included Reshmi Nair, Jennifer Hollett and Nick Purdon.

Several months before the first airing, Mark Kelley pitched to his executives the concept of a "highly interactive nightly news show" which would use new media technologies. The show debuted on October 26, 2009.

The show ended on June 22, 2012 due to budget cuts resulting from the 2012 Canadian federal budget. Kelley went on to join the CBC's weekly newsmagazine series The Fifth Estate.
