= Carole MacNeil =

Canadian journalist

- Born: 1963 or 1964 (age 61–62)
- Occupations: Journalist, news presenter
- Television: CBC News: Sunday Night (2002—2009); CBC Rundown with Carole MacNeil (2002—2021)
- Spouse: Richard Stursberg (m. 2009)

Carole MacNeil is a Canadian television journalist, known for her work with the Canadian Broadcasting Corporation which spanned over thirty years.

MacNeil began her career anchoring local news programs in New Brunswick and Ontario in the early 1990s, before joining CBC Newsworld in 1998. Her most recent program was CBC Rundown with Carole MacNeil, a daytime news program on CBC News Network.

== Biography ==
MacNeil grew up in Cape Breton, Nova Scotia. From 1990 to 1994, she worked at CBC affiliate station CHSJ-TV in Fredericton, New Brunswick, where she was a co-anchor for the evening news program and the host of a current affairs program. In October 1994, she moved to Windsor, Ontario, where she became the anchor of the local evening newscast on CBET, the local CBC station. MacNeil replaced David Kyle as the station's late-night news anchor in February 1996, becoming the anchor of both the evening and late-night newscasts. Leaving the Windsor station in August 1998, she joined CBC Newsworld as a co-anchor of the CBC morning news program with Ralph Benmergui.

In 2000, MacNeil helped launch Canada Now, the supper hour news program on CBC Television.

In February 2002, MacNeil and Evan Solomon became the host of CBC News: Sunday Night, an hour-long prime time news broadcast on CBC Television, as well as on CBC Newsworld. CBC News Sunday won several Gemini Awards. At the 24th Gemini Awards in 2009, one of MacNeil's reports for CBC News: Sunday Night was nominated for "Best Lifestyle/practical information segment". The program was cancelled in May 2009 during a restructuring of CBC News by CBC executive Richard Stursberg, who MacNeil married weeks later in June 2009.

In 2011, the CBC Ombudsman was called to review MacNeil's on-air statements concerning the Six Day War. Upon review the "CBC acknowledged it was misleading for [MacNeil] to assert that neighbouring countries attacked Israel."

MacNeil joined the CBC in May 1987, and celebrated her 25th anniversary in 2012. From October 2012 to September 2013, MacNeil took a leave of absence and studied abroad in France.

In October 2021, MacNeil announced that she would be departing from CBC News later that month. Her last broadcast on CBC Rundown with Carole MacNeil took place on October 26, 2021.
