= Margaret Evans (journalist) =

Canadian journalist

Margaret Evans is a Canadian journalist, currently working as a foreign correspondent for the Canadian Broadcasting Corporation (CBC).

The daughter of Art Evans, a journalist, and Una MacLean Evans, an Edmonton city councillor, she was born in Edmonton and grew up there. She received a BA from the University of Alberta and a MA from City University London. During the 1990s, she worked as a freelance journalist based in Brussels covering the development of the European Union and the Yugoslav Wars. Based in Jerusalem from 2004, she was CBC's Middle East Bureau Chief from 2009 to 2011. She is now based in CBC's European Bureau in London and has reported from Iraq, Ukraine, South Africa and the Mediterranean.

Evans received an Amnesty International Canada Media Award in 2007. With Derek Stoffel, she received a gold medal in 2013 at the New York Festivals Television and Film Awards and a RTNDA Canada Ron Laidlaw Award. She was a finalist for a 2015 Canadian Association of Journalists award. Evans won best national reporter at the 14th Canadian Screen Awards.
