= Jack Webster Awards =

Canadian journalism prizes

Webster
- Awarded for: Outstanding achievement in Journalism in B.C.
- Country: Canada
- First award: 1984
- Website: www.jackwebster.com/awards/

Jack Webster Awards are a series of yearly industry awards presented by the Jack Webster Foundation for outstanding achievement in journalism in the Canadian province of British Columbia. The awards were established in 1986 by the foundation and named after the late Jack Webster, who was a longtime reporter in British Columbia. Split into multiple categories, they are the top journalism honours in the province.
