= Marketplace (Canadian TV program) =

Canadian investigative television program

- The most recent version of the show's logo
- Also known as: CBC News: Marketplace
- Genre: News magazine; Investigative journalism; Consumer affairs
- Presented by: Asha Tomlinson; Charlsie Agro
- Country of origin: Canada
- Original language: English
- No. of seasons: 50
- No. of episodes: 500

Production
- Executive producer: Nelisha Vellani
- Producers: Greg Sadler; Jeremy Macdonald; Katie Pedersen; Jenny Cowley
- Editors: Simon Parubchak; Aaron Taylor
- Running time: 22 minutes
- Production company: Canadian Broadcasting Corporation (CBC)

Original release
- Network: CBC Television
- Release: 5 October 1972 – present

Marketplace (officially CBC News: Marketplace) is a Canadian investigative consumer program which has been broadcast on CBC Television since 1972. The program investigates consumer reports on issues such as product testing, health and safety, fraudulent business practices, and also tests government and industry promises.

Despite airing on Friday nights, which typically have low viewership, the show has had high ratings and achieved over 1 million viewers for some episodes. In 2012, it was the fifth-highest rated show on CBC.

== History ==
The program was influential in the banning of urea formaldehyde foam insulation and lawn darts in Canada, the legislation of warnings on exploding pop bottles, successful prosecution of retailers for false advertising, new standards for bottled water and drinking fountains, new regulations to make children's sleepwear less flammable, and the implementation of safer designs for infant beds.

The program's reporting has exposed the illegal dumping and burning of Canadian plastic recycling in Malaysia, the sale of fake university degrees to Canadian professors and social workers, and its hidden camera investigations documented hygiene issues in hospitals, misleading sales practices, and violence and neglect in long-term care homes.

Investigations have led to corporate and government changes: Google Maps launched a review of the country's locksmith listings after the identification of dozens of fake listings and reviews. Ontario's real estate board launched an investigation and review of its agents after the program documented agents breaking rules around "double-ending".

When the program's original lab testing found dangerous levels of cadmium in jewelry sold by Ardene and Aldo, journalists travelled to China to expose how these chemicals end up in products found on Canadian store shelves. The episode prompted an investigation by Health Canada and changes in the companies' suppliers.

One of its most popular programs involved an international investigation tracking the people behind the Canada Revenue Agency scams and technical support scams. The reporting triggered "Project Octavia", a criminal investigation by the Royal Canadian Mounted Police (RCMP). In February 2020, journalists were granted exclusive access to document the arrest of Canadian "super money mules" alleged to have been working with criminals in India to defraud Canadian victims.

Marketplace was originally hosted by Joan Watson and George Finstad. Watson eventually married one of the first producers of the show, Murray Creed. Other hosts have included Bill Paul, Harry Brown, Norma Kent, Jacquie Perrin, Christine Johnson, Erica Johnson, Jim Nunn, Tom Harrington, Wendy Mesley, David Common and Chris Glover. The program's current hosts are Charlsie Agro and Asha Tomlinson.

Early seasons of the program had a theme song, "The Consumer", which was written and performed by Stompin' Tom Connors. For several years, every episode would begin with Connors singing the song, which became a hit.

Every Thursday, The National airs a weekly segment that is based on the week's episode with Adrienne Arsenault introducing the segment.

In 2023, an audio podcast version of the show was produced and with the episodes scheduled for release on July 4, 2023. In addition, the podcast was broadcast as a summer replacement series on CBC Radio One.

Erica Johnson has stated that the network does not interfere in the development of episodes, even when it negatively reports about the network's advertisers.
