= World Report (CBC) =

CBC Radio One news program

World Report is a Canadian radio news program, which airs weekdays at 5, 6, 7 and 8 AM, and Saturdays and Sundays at 6, 7, 8 and 9 AM, on CBC Radio One.

It currently runs 10 minutes and focuses on major national and international news, allowing the local and regional programming during those timeslots to primarily focus their content on their own regions. The program's current weekday anchor as of November 21, 2022, is Marcia Young, and the weekend anchor is John Northcott. The programme began in 1958 as The World at Eight and was called The World at Seven, The World at Eight or The World at Nine, depending on the hour and time zone in which it was heard, until October 1982 when it was renamed World Report.

Past hosts included Rex Loring, Judy Maddren, Russ Germain, Peter Armstrong, David Common and Nil Köksal.

The program was originally broadcast on both CBC Radio One and CBC Radio 2, but was removed from Radio 2's schedule in 2007.

From its inception until 1982, the theme music that ran as a sound bed under the headlines consisted of a series of radio beeps meant to emulate the sound transmitted by Sputnik 1.
