= Heather Hiscox =

Canadian journalist

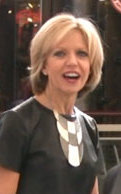
- Hiscox in 2013
- Born: Owen Sound, Ontario
- Education: University of Toronto, University of Western Ontario
- Occupation: News presenter
- Employer: Canadian Broadcasting Corporation
- Spouse: Dr. Martin Goldbach

Heather Hiscox is a Canadian news anchor who is the former host of CBC Morning Live with Heather Hiscox from 6 to 10 a.m. during weekdays on CBC News Network. She has also hosted CBC's former flagship morning television program CBC News: Morning which became part of CBC News Now when the network re-branded itself in 2009.

In June 2025, Hiscox announced that she will retire from the CBC in the fall, following a special edition of Morning Live in November on the occasion of her 20th anniversary hosting the show.

== Biography ==
Hiscox was born in Owen Sound, Ontario and grew up in a medical family. She graduated in 1986 from the University of Toronto, with a B.A. in French language and literature and from the University of Western Ontario in 1987 with a master's degree in journalism. She has previously worked for CFPL-TV, CBC Montreal, the Global Television Network, ASN and CHCH in Hamilton, Ontario, before returning to the CBC at the network level. She also co-hosted a morning show on 1290 CJBK in London, Ontario, with Steve Garrison from 1990 to 1991. From 1988 to 1989, she did a variety of radio shifts at London's Rock FM96 CFPL-FM including afternoon drive and evenings. She began her broadcasting career in her hometown of Owen Sound at radio station CFOS/CFPS. In 1997, she appeared on the CIQC AM 600 Montreal program Travel World as part of a feature headlined as "The Hidden Holiday Hide-away Haunts of Heather Hiscox".

Hiscox won the Miss Teen Canada pageant in 1981 when she was 16 years old. She is married to a heart surgeon, Martin Goldbach.

Honorary titles
Preceded by Clara Jean Howard	Miss Teen Canada 1981	Succeeded by Emily Sertic
