= Asha Tomlinson =

Canadian journalist

Asha Tomlinson is a Canadian television journalist, currently one of the hosts of CBC Television's consumer affairs newsmagazine series Marketplace. She is a two-time Canadian Screen Award winner for Best Host or Interviewer in a News or Information Program or Series for her work on Marketplace, winning the award at the 7th Canadian Screen Awards in 2019 and at the 9th Canadian Screen Awards in 2021.

Originally from the Toronto suburb of Scarborough, Ontario, and of Jamaican descent, Tomlinson studied journalism at the University of Windsor. She has worked as a reporter for various television stations across Canada, and as an anchor for CBC News Network, before being named anchor of the 6 p.m. newscast on CBET-DT, Windsor's CBC station, in 2013. She joined the staff of Marketplace in 2015.

In 2020 she was the host of Being Black in Canada, a one-hour special devoted to news and documentary reporting on Black Canadian political and cultural issues. Since summer 2021, she has been regularly featured as a guest anchor of CBC's main nightly newscast The National.
