= The Exchange (TV series) =

- Also known as: The Lang and O'Leary Exchange (2009-14)
- Presented by: Amanda Lang (2009–15); Kevin O'Leary (2009–14); Peter Armstrong (2015–16)
- Country of origin: Canada
- Original language: English

Production
- Running time: 60 minutes

Original release
- Network: CBC News Network
- Release: October 26, 2009 – September 9, 2016

The Exchange was a Canadian business news television series which aired weekdays on CBC News Network, with an overnight rebroadcast on CBC Television, from October 26, 2009 to September 9, 2016.

The show originally launched as The Lang and O'Leary Exchange, a half-hour daily series co-hosted by CBC's senior business correspondent Amanda Lang and businessman Kevin O'Leary, starting at 4:30 p.m. Eastern. Lang and O'Leary had previously co-hosted the Business News Network series SqueezePlay.

On March 1, 2010 The Lang and O'Leary Exchange became an hour-long show starting at 7 p.m., pre-taped earlier in the evening, and aired on the CBC News Network. In September 2012, the show was revised into two half-hour formats, and gained an airing at 6:30 p.m. local time for the first half hour on CBC Television following local newscasts.

Guest hosts, when Lang or O'Leary have been absent, have included Rudyard Griffiths, Bruce Sellery, Preet Banerjee, Som Seif, Mike Abramsky, Dianne Buckner, Danielle Bochove, Michael Hyatt, David Chilton and David Kaufman.

On August 11, 2014, it was announced that Kevin O'Leary would leave the CBC, and join Bell Media to return to his previous home of BNN. As a result of the change, Amanda Lang became the sole host of the program, which was renamed The Exchange with Amanda Lang the following Monday. A few months later the program was relaunched, doing away with most of the Lang & O'Leary-era segments.

On October 13, 2015, the CBC announced that Lang would leave CBC News to move to Bloomberg TV Canada. The Exchange continued with a number of rotating hosts, until Peter Armstrong was named the program's new permanent host in 2016. The program ended on September 9, 2016; its successor, On the Money (hosted by Armstrong), launched in the same 7 - 8 PM (Eastern) time slot on September 12, 2016.
