= Pawthereum =

Denominations
- Code: PAWTH

Development
- White paper: "Pawpaper"
- Initial release: October 10, 2021 /
- Development status: Active
- Project fork of: GRUMPY

Ledger
- Supply limit: 1,000,000,000

Website
- Website: https://pawthereum.com/

Pawthereum is a memecoin. It was created in October 2021, and runs on the Ethereum network. A percentage of every transaction is donated to animal-related charities.

== History ==
The Pawthereum Foundation (also known as Stichting Pawthereum) was formed in the Netherlands. Pawthereum was originally known as GRUMPY, based on Grumpy Cat. In March 2021, the Grumpy Cat Coin project donated $70,000 in crypto funds to Sterling Animal Shelter. GRUMPY was converted into Pawthereum after a lawsuit by the owners of Grumpy Cat. $70,000 in crypto funds were donated to Sterling Animal Shelter under the Grumpy name.

Donations under the Pawthereum name include 26 ETH, valued at around $120,000 at the time, to Edinburgh Dog and Cat Home. Another was $50,000 to Four Paws USA, done as a matching donation on Giving Tuesday (November 30, 2021). The project also made a donation valued at $50,000 to Catherine Violet Hubbard Animal Sanctuary.

Canadian businessman Kevin O'Leary has repeatedly endorsed the project.
