= Bloomberg TV Canada =

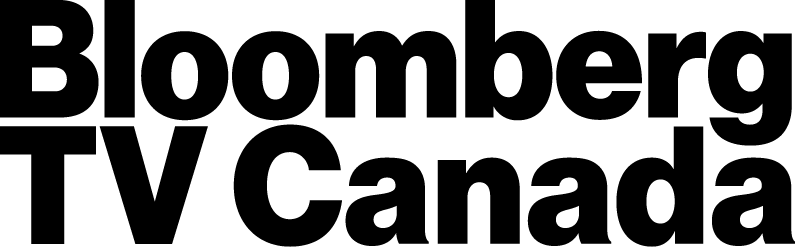
- Bloomberg TV Canada logo
- Country: Canada
- Broadcast area: Nationwide
- Headquarters: Toronto, Ontario

Ownership
- Owner: Channel Zero

History
- Launched: November 17, 2015
- Closed: October 5, 2017

Links
- Website: Bloomberg TV Canada

Bloomberg TV Canada was a Canadian English language specialty channel owned by Channel Zero. It served as a localized version of the U.S. financial news channel Bloomberg Television, while its programming was largely identical, but also featured opt-outs for domestic programs covering Canadian business news.

The channel launched on November 17, 2015, replacing the American version that was readily available in Canada. The channel shut down on October 5, 2017, and Bloomberg subsequently partnered with established Canadian competitor Business News Network (BNN) in 2018 instead. As a result of the partnership, BNN became BNN Bloomberg.

== History ==
On February 26, 2015, Channel Zero announced it had reached an agreement with Bloomberg L.P. to launch a localized Canadian business news channel as an offshoot of its original American Bloomberg Television channel which was currently being distributed in Canada for several years at the time. It was later announced that the channel was expected to launch on November 16, 2015 with its studios located in downtown Toronto in the city's financial district.

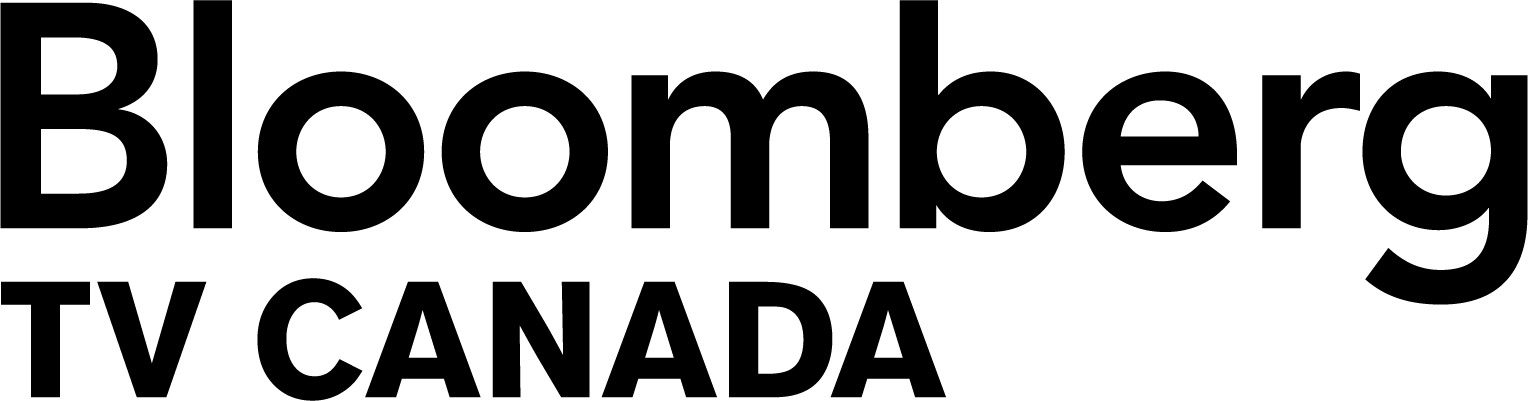
Original logo used from 2015 to 2016

The channel launched one day later than expected on November 17, 2015. At the time of launch, the American service was withheld from being distributed by Canadian television service providers at the request of its owners, although it remained a legally authorized channel for distribution in Canada by the Canadian Radio-television and Telecommunications Commission (CRTC).

Programming on the service largely mirrored the American channel's schedule, but with two local programs covering Canadian business news; Bloomberg North, and The Daily Brief. They were later cancelled and replaced with Bloomberg Markets: Canada in January 2017, which was hosted by former Reuters TV journalist Lily Jamali.

Originally launched as an exempt discretionary service that did not require a CRTC-granted television licence as it did not at launch have the required 200,000 subscribers, the channel was granted a CRTC licence on August 17, 2017 after reaching that subscriber level in 2016.

On the same day Channel Zero was granted its licence for Bloomberg TV Canada by the CRTC, Channel Zero announced in a statement that it would be cancelling all Canadian original productions for the channel and laying off 22 members of its staff relating to those productions, leading to speculation of how Channel Zero would maintain its required Canadian content quotas with no original Canadian productions. The statement referred to September 1, 2017 as the date the channel will be "changing the focus" of its programming, however, still maintaining that the channel will focus on business news and information, with reporting from Bloomberg studios in Canada and around the world, suggesting the channel would remain in operation.

On October 5, 2017, the channel was discontinued and replaced with the American Bloomberg Television service, the channel Bloomberg TV Canada replaced at its launch in 2015. The CRTC granted a request by Channel Zero to revoke the broadcasting licence for Bloomberg TV Canada on December 8, 2017.

In January 2018, Bloomberg partnered with Bell Media's Business News Network (BNN), renaming it BNN Bloomberg.

== Personalities ==
On October 13, 2015, CBC News anchor Amanda Lang (who hosted CBC News Network's financial news program The Exchange) announced that she would leave and join Bloomberg TV Canada, serving as host of Bloomberg North. The network also hired former BNN journalists Pamela Ritchie as anchor of The Daily Brief and Michael Bancroft as executive producer of the channel.

After Bloomberg TV Canada launched, CBC reporter/anchor Danielle Bochove joined her former colleague at Bloomberg TV Canada primarily on a part-time basis, serving as substitute anchor for Bloomberg North and, occasionally, The Daily Brief, in addition to occasional reporting duties covering Canadian financial markets alongside her colleagues.

In February 2016, Lang began hosting Bloomberg North on Tuesdays and Wednesdays only, with Rudyard Griffiths joining to host on Mondays, Pat Kiernan hosting on Thursdays, and all three rotating as host of the Friday edition.
