= On the Money =

On the Money is the name of several finance- and business-focused television series:

- On the Money (2005 TV program), an American daily personal finance television program airing from 2005–2009 on CNBC
- On the Money (2013 TV program), formerly The Wall Street Journal Report, an American weekly business television program airing from 2013–2019 on CNBC and in broadcast syndication
- On the Money (Canadian TV program), a Canadian daily finance and business television program airing from 2016–2018 on CBC News Network
- On the Money (Philippine TV program), a Filipino daily business finance television program airing from July 30, 2012 on ANC
