= Sally Merchant =

Canadian politician

Maria Margharita "Sally" Merchant (October 1, 1919 – April 1, 2007) was a Saskatchewan television personality and political figure. She was the only Liberal MLA elected to represent Saskatoon in the Legislative Assembly of Saskatchewan from 1964 to 1967. She did not seek re-election in 1967.

== Life and career ==
She was born Maria Margharita Smith in Yorkton, Saskatchewan, the daughter of Vincent Smith, a Saskatchewan judge and former MLA for Yorkton. She received a B.A. from Dalhousie University and a B.Ed. from the University of Saskatchewan. In 1941, she married Captain Evatt Francis Anthony Merchant; he was killed in action during World War II. Her husband's brother was Robert Thomas Peter Merchant (1917–2011), a prominent Halifax businessman.

She joined CFQC-TV (later CTV) in Saskatoon in 1955 and went on to host a television interview show known as Sally Time. From 1964 to 1967, she served as a Liberal MLA in the Saskatchewan legislature. In 1967, she was named to the Canadian delegation to the United Nations. She served in the federal Department of Consumer and Corporate Affairs from 1969 to 1983, and with the CRTC from 1983 to 1988. She lectured at the University of Alberta, the University of Manitoba and the University of Saskatchewan. She died in Saskatoon in April 2007.

== Children ==
Her son Anthony "Tony" Merchant is a fifth generation lawyer and served from 1975 to 1978 as a Liberal MLA in the Saskatchewan legislature. His wife, Pana Merchant, was a Liberal Senator for Saskatchewan from 2002 to 2017 under Prime Ministers Chretien, Martin, Harper, and Justin Trudeau.

Her daughter Adrian Merchant married Donald Stovel Macdonald in 1988. Adrian had been previously married to Otto Lang, with whom she had seven children: Maria (d. 1991), Timothy Lang, Gregory, Andrew, Elisabeth, Adrian, and Amanda Lang. Both Macdonald and Lang were long term Liberal members of Parliament from Ontario and Saskatchewan respectively and both were long term members of the Cabinet of Pierre Elliot Trudeau.

Legislative Assembly of Saskatchewan
Preceded by Arthur T. Stone and Gladys Strum	Member of the Legislative Assembly for Saskatoon City; 1964–1967; Served alongside: Alexander Malcolm Nicholson, John Edward Brockelbank, Wesley A. Robbins, and Harry D. Link	Riding abolished
