= Kevin O'Leary =

Canadian businessman and author (born 1954)

- O'Leary in 2012
- Born: Terrence Thomas Kevin O'Leary; July 9, 1954 (age 72); Montreal, Quebec, Canada
- Other name: Mr. Wonderful
- Citizenship: Canada; Ireland; United Arab Emirates
- Education: University of Waterloo (BES); University of Western Ontario (MBA)
- Occupations: Businessman, investor, author, television personality, actor, and retired politician
- Known for: Reality TV host, CNBC and BNN contributor
- Political party: Conservative (2004–present)
- Other political affiliations: Liberal (before 2004)
- Spouse: Linda Greer (m. 1990)
- Children: 2
- Website: kevinoleary.com

Terrence Thomas Kevin O'Leary (born July 9, 1954), self-styled as Mr. Wonderful, is a Canadian businessman and television personality. From 2004 to 2014, he appeared on various Canadian television shows, including the business news program The Lang and O'Leary Exchange as well as reality show Dragons' Den. O'Leary hosted Discovery Channel's Project Earth in 2008 and has appeared on Shark Tank, the American version of Dragons' Den, since 2009. He made his feature film debut as Milton Rockwell in Josh Safdie's Marty Supreme (2025).

O'Leary co-founded SoftKey Software Products, a technology company that sold software geared toward family education and entertainment. During the late 1980s and 1990s, SoftKey became a major consolidator in the global educational software market, having acquired rival companies via hostile takeover bids, such as Compton's New Media, the Learning Company, and Broderbund. SoftKey later changed its name to The Learning Company and was acquired by Mattel in 1999, surprising many financial observers, who viewed O'Leary's company as a house of cards. Nevertheless, the sale netted O'Leary around six million dollars. Mattel promptly fired O'Leary. The acquisition resulted in significant losses for The Learning Company and sparked multiple shareholder lawsuits targeting O'Leary's mismanagement.

In 2017, he campaigned to be the leader of the Conservative Party of Canada. He dropped out in April 2017, one month before the election, citing a lack of support in Quebec.

O'Leary holds Canadian, Irish and Emirati citizenship. He is a resident of Miami, Florida, US.

== Early life and education ==
O'Leary was born on 9 July 1954, in Montreal, one of two sons of Georgette (née Bookalam; Arabic: جورجيت بوكلام), a small-business owner and investor of Lebanese descent, and Terry O'Leary, a salesman of Irish descent. Kevin also has a brother, Shane O'Leary. Due to his paternal heritage, O'Leary also holds Irish citizenship and carries an Irish passport. O'Leary has dyslexia, which he argued helped him in the world of business by fostering out-of-the-box thinking.

O'Leary grew up in Mount Royal, Quebec. His parents divorced when he was a child, largely due to his father's alcoholism. His father died shortly after that, when O'Leary was only seven. After his father's death, his mother ran the family's clothing business as an executive. His mother later married an economist, George Kanawaty, who worked with the UN's International Labour Organization. His stepfather's international assignments caused the family to move frequently, and O'Leary lived in many places while growing up, including Cambodia, Ethiopia, Tunisia, and Cyprus. In his youth, he met both Haile Selassie of Ethiopia and Pol Pot of Cambodia. O'Leary attended Stanstead College and St. George's School, both in Quebec.

O'Leary's mother was a skilled investor, investing a third of her weekly paycheque in large-cap, dividend-paying stocks and interest-bearing bonds, ultimately achieving high returns in her investment portfolio. She kept her investment portfolio secret, so O'Leary only discovered his mother's skill as an investor after her death when her will was executed. Many of his investment lessons came from his mother, including the admonition to save one-third of his money.

O'Leary had aspired to become a photographer, but on the advice of his stepfather, who prompted the young Kevin to be more realistic with his future career aspirations, decided to attend university, where he continued to develop his interest in business and investing since his youth. He received an honours bachelor's degree in environmental studies and psychology from the University of Waterloo in 1977 and an MBA in entrepreneurship from Ivey Business School at the University of Western Ontario in 1980.

== Business career ==
In 1978, between the first and second years of his MBA program, O'Leary was selected for an internship at Nabisco in Downtown Toronto and then worked as an assistant brand manager for Nabisco's cat food brand. O'Leary attributed his future business success at The Learning Company as a result of the extensive marketing skills that he honed during his assistant brand management days at Nabisco.

After leaving Nabisco, O'Leary began a brief career as a television producer. With two of his former MBA classmates, Scott Mackenzie and Dave Toms (both of whom had assisted on O'Leary's MBA documentary), O'Leary co-founded Special Event Television (SET). SET was an independent television production company that produced original sports programming such as The Original Six, Don Cherry's Grapevine, and Bobby Orr & The Hockey Legends. The company achieved limited success with minor television shows, soccer films, sports documentaries, and short in-between-period commercials for local professional hockey games. One of his partners later bought out his share of the venture for $25,000.

=== SoftKey ===
After selling his SET share, O'Leary then proceeded to move on to his next business venture. He started SoftKey in a Toronto basement in 1986, along with business partners John Freeman and Gary Babcock. The company was a publisher and distributor of CD-based personal computer software for Microsoft Windows and Macintosh computers. A major financial supporter who had committed $250,000 in investment capital to finance O'Leary's company backed out the day before signing the documents and delivering his cheque, leaving O'Leary to go elsewhere to seek the necessary funding sources that he needed to support his fledgling business. Desperate to secure funding, O'Leary turned to using the proceeds that he gained from selling his SET share while also convincing his mother to lend him $10,000 in seed capital to establish SoftKey Software Products.

As the software and personal-computer industries were proliferating throughout the course of the early 1980s, O'Leary convinced printer manufacturers to bundle Softkey's program with their hardware. With distribution assured, the company developed several educational software products focused on mathematics and reading education. Softkey products typically consisted of software for home users, especially compilation discs containing various freeware or shareware games packaged in "jewel-case" CD-ROMs.

Softkey weathered stiff competition from other software companies in the late 1980s and prospered throughout the 1990s. By 1993, Softkey had become a major consolidator in the educational software market, acquiring rivals such as WordStar and Spinnaker Software in the process. In 1995, Softkey acquired The Learning Company (TLC) for $606 million, adopting its name, and moved its headquarters to Cambridge, Massachusetts.

TLC lost $105 million (US) in 1998 on revenues of $800 million and suffered losses over the previous two years. TLC bought its former rival Broderbund in June 1998 for $416 million.

In 1999, TLC was acquired by Mattel for US$4.2 billion. Following the acquisition, sales and earnings for Mattel soon dropped, and O'Leary was fired. The purchase by Mattel was later called one of the most disastrous corporate acquisitions in recent business history. While acquisition management had projected a post-acquisition profit of US$50 million, Mattel actually experienced a loss of US$105 million. Mattel's stock dropped, wiping out US$3 billion of shareholder value in a single day. Mattel's shareholders later filed a class-action lawsuit accusing Mattel executives, O'Leary, and former TLC CEO Michael Perik of misleading investors about the health of TLC and the benefits of its acquisition. The lawsuit alleged that TLC used accounting tricks to hide losses and inflate quarterly revenues. In response, O'Leary and his defendants disputed all of the charges, with Mattel later paying $122 million to settle the lawsuit in 2003. O'Leary blamed the technology meltdown and a culture clash between the management of the two companies for the failure of the acquisition. Bernie Stolar who was brought in to save Mattel did not mince words, he openly blamed O'Leary for killing the edutainment industry. Stolar hired a forensic accountant and determined the company was losing US$1 million per day. He said "The problem was when Jill Barad bought The Learning Company, it was the right decision for Mattel to go into the software business. They just bought the wrong company. She didn’t realize she was buying a company that had top-end revenue but no bottom line. It was an ugly mess with an awful lot of mismanagement. O'Leary left behind hidden losses, such as massive product return rates. It was an utter disaster." Stolar bluntly told Mattel's board "you approved this, you should never have fired Jill, all of you should have been fired instead. You're the board of directors".

O'Leary and financial backers from Citigroup made an unsuccessful attempt to acquire the French video game company Atari, with O'Leary having made plans to start a video-gaming television channel which never materialized.

=== StorageNow Holdings ===
In 2003, O'Leary became a co-investor and corporate director at StorageNow Holdings, a Canadian developer of climate-controlled storage facilities controlled by Reza and Asif Satchu. StorageNow became the largest operator of storage services in Canada, with facilities in 11 cities, and was acquired by Storage REIT in March 2007 for $110 million. O'Leary later sold his shares, which yielded a windfall profit exceeding $4.5 million through realized capital gains, with his initial stake being originally valued at $500,000.

In May 2005, Reza Satchu and O'Leary's operating partner, Wheeler, filed a $10-million wrongful dismissal lawsuit, charging that they had altered an agreed-upon compensation deal and illegally reduced Wheeler's share of the profits. O'Leary and Satchu claimed Wheeler failed to reach performance targets. The case was settled out of court.

=== Other ventures ===
In March 2007, O'Leary joined the advisory board of Genstar Capital, a private equity firm that focuses on investing in health care, industrial technology, business services, and software. Genstar Capital appointed O'Leary to its Strategic Advisory Board to seek new investment opportunities for its $1.2 billion fund.

==== O'Leary Funds ====
In 2008, O'Leary co-founded O'Leary Funds Inc., a mutual fund management firm focused on global yield investing. He is the company's chairman and lead investor, while his brother, Shane O'Leary, serves as a director. The fund's assets under management grew from $400 million in 2011 to $1.2 billion in 2012. The fund's primary manager was Stanton Asset Management, a firm controlled by the husband-and-wife team of Connor O'Brien and Louise Ann Poirier.

According to research by Canadian banker Mark R. McQueen, O'Leary's fund increased distribution yield from his funds by returning invested capital to shareholders. While this is not unusual, it was contrary to O'Leary's statements. Another analysis also found that one-quarter of the distributions from one of O'Leary's funds were return of capital.

In November 2014, O'Leary Funds Management agreed to pay penalties to the Autorité des marchés financiers for violating certain technical provisions of the Securities Act. At the time of the agreement, O'Leary Funds reported taking steps to correct the violations. On October 15, 2015, O'Leary Funds was sold to Canoe Financial, a private investment-management company owned by Canadian businessman W. Brett Wilson. Wilson was once an investor with O'Leary on CBC's Dragons' Den.

==== O'Leary Ventures ====
O'Leary is also the founder of O'Leary Ventures, a private early-stage venture capital investment company, O'Leary Mortgages, O'Leary books, and O'Leary Fine Wines. In April 2014, O'Leary Mortgages closed. O'Leary's funds have a questionable history and are said to have declined over 20% in a year, often a big blow to fund managers. O'Leary no longer manages outside money.

==== ETF and investing ====
On July 14, 2015, O'Leary launched an Exchange-traded fund (ETF) through O'Shares Investments, a division of his investment fund, O'Leary Funds Management LP, where O'Leary serves as chairman. A value investor, he has advised on personal finance. He advocates portfolio diversification and suggests that investors have their age as the percentage of bonds in their portfolios (i.e., 30% in bonds and 70% in stocks for a 30-year-old investor, with an increasing proportion of bonds and decreasing proportion of stocks as the investor ages). O'Leary has also "stated on many occasions that he won't invest in publicly-traded stock unless it pays him a dividend."

O'Leary is also an active gold investor, with five percent of his financial portfolio invested in physical gold. However, he does not invest in stocks of gold-mining companies because he says cash flow is an important investment factor to him. O'Leary also advises diversification in multiple industry sectors while dedicating no more than 20 percent of one's financial portfolio being concentrated in one sector.

==== Cryptocurrency ====
O'Leary initially expressed skepticism about cryptocurrency, describing bitcoin as "a digital game" and "useless currency" in 2019. He illustrated his thinking with the following example, "Let's say you want to buy a piece of Swiss real estate for $10 million in bitcoin...The seller wants a guarantee that the bitcoin value comes back to the U.S. currency. You have to somehow hedge the risk of bitcoin. That means it's not a real currency. That means the receiver is not willing to take the risk of the volatility it has. It's worthless."

In May 2021, O'Leary said he had made a 3 to 5% allocation to bitcoin and had become a strategic investor in the Vancouver-based decentralized finance platform Defi Ventures; the company then renamed itself WonderFi Technologies, in reference to O'Leary's nickname, "Mr. Wonderful".

In August 2021, it was announced O'Leary would take an ownership stake in the parent companies of FTX.com and FTX.US as part of his compensation for becoming a "spokesperson and ambassador" for FTX. FTX subsequently went bankrupt due to CEO Sam Bankman-Fried secretly using client funds to make speculative bets that were unsuccessful. In November 2022, O'Leary, alongside other spokespeople for FTX, was sued in a class-action lawsuit. There is precedent for prosecuting individuals promoting fraudulent cryptocurrency ventures—regardless of whether they had plausible deniability. For example, in February 2022, the U.S. 11th Circuit Court of Appeals ruled in a lawsuit against Bitconnect that the Securities Act of 1933 extends to targeted solicitation using social media. O'Leary claimed on CNBC that he was paid $15 million for the spokesman role, adding that he lost $9.7 million in digital assets, the remainder allotment in various fees and taxes, and a further million dollars' worth of equity after the company's insolvency. At an FTX hearing, O'Leary claimed that Binance CEO Changpeng Zhao "put FTX out of business."

O'Leary has been an advocate of cryptocurrency investing, including Pawthereum.

=== Project Stratos ===
In April 2026, O'Leary announced a joint venture between O'Leary Digital and Utah's Military Installation Development Authority (MIDA) to construct a large data centre campus and energy infrastructure in Box Elder County, Utah. The venture, the Stratos Project, would span roughly 40,000 acres (160 km^{2}) across multiple sites in the arid region north of the Great Salt Lake. At full capacity, the project is estimated to consume up to 9 gigawatts of electricity, or more than double the entire state of Utah's current consumption. Citing energy concerns, O'Leary claimed the project would operate off-grid, generating its own energy by tapping into the nearby natural gas Ruby Pipeline.

Local residents and scientists have raised concerns relating to the project's potential energy and water use, emissions, as well as its overall environmental impact. 76% of Utahns opposed further data center construction in their state in an October 2026 survey.

On May 4, 2026, Box Elder County officials green-lit the project's proposal.

On May 12, 2026, O'Leary accused two Utah-based nonprofit groups which oppose construction of the Stratos project, without evidence, of being funded by the Chinese government during a televised exchange with the leader of one of the groups. In July 2026, the accused parties sued O'Leary and FOX News Network for defamation. In October 2026, O'Leary was sued by another party for defamation.

The project was mocked on NBC's Saturday Night Live as James Austin Johnson imitated O'Leary and said "I'm going to make the future go away. And we’re doing just that in Utah."

== Books ==
- Cold Hard Truth: On Business, Money & Life (2011)
- Cold Hard Truth on Men, Women, and Money: 50 Common Money Mistakes and How to Fix Them (2012)
- Cold Hard Truth on Family, Kids and Money (2015)
- Cold Hard Truth on Marriage and Money: Part Two of Cold Hard Truth on Family, Kids and Money (2015)
- Digital Pivot or Bust In a Post COVID-19 World: Why Small Businesses Must Re-Think Everything to Survive and Thrive! (2020)

== Media ==
=== Dragons' Den and Shark Tank ===
In 2006, O'Leary appeared as one of the five follow-up venture capitalists on the then-new show Dragons' Den on CBC, the Canadian installment of the international Dragons' Den format. On the show, O'Leary developed a persona as a blunt, abrasive investor, who at one point told a contestant who started crying, "Money doesn't care. Your tears don't add any value." This television persona was encouraged by executive producer Stuart Coxe, who occasionally asked O'Leary to be "more evil" during the first two seasons. Dragons' Den became one of the most-watched shows in CBC history, with around two million viewers per episode. Coxe attributed the show's success in large part to O'Leary's presence.

In 2009, the American version of Dragons' Den, Shark Tank, began, and Shark Tank executive producer Mark Burnett invited two of the CBC Dragons' Den investors, O'Leary and Robert Herjavec, to appear on the show. Both have remained with Shark Tank since the beginning. For several years, they appeared on both shows, although Herjavec left Dragons' Den in 2012, and O'Leary left in 2014. Shark Tank became a ratings hit, averaging 9 million viewers per episode at its peak in the 2014–15 season. It has also been a critical favourite, winning the Primetime Emmy Award for Outstanding Structured Reality Program four times.

O'Leary's appearances on Dragons' Den and Shark Tank popularized the nickname "Mr. Wonderful" for him; he has said that he is often referred to by that name in public. O'Leary has said that the nickname serves both as a tongue-in-cheek reference to his reputation for being mean, as well as a reflection of his view that his blunt assessments are helpful to misguided, naive, and inexperienced entrepreneurs. In a 2013 interview, O'Leary implied that he could not remember how he got the nickname. He had already referred to himself as "Mr. Wonderful" in a 2006 casting video for Dragon's Den, predating either show.

Besides his acerbic demeanor, domineering imposition, and blunt television persona, O'Leary has also gained a reputation on both shows for preferring deals in which he loans the entrepreneurs money in exchange for a percentage of future revenue, rather than taking a share of the company.

Notable deals in which O'Leary has been involved on Shark Tank include investments in Talbott Teas (later bought by Jamba Juice) and GrooveBook (later bought by Shutterfly), the latter with Mark Cuban. Some of his recent investments include Hello Prenup with Nirav Tolia of Nextdoor. All of his Dragons' Den and Shark Tank investments are consolidated, presided, and managed under his holding company, called "Something Wonderful."

=== Discovery Channel's Discovery Project Earth ===
In 2008, O'Leary worked as a co-host for the Discovery Channel's Discovery Project Earth, a show that explores innovative ways to reverse climate change.

=== The Lang and O'Leary Exchange ===
In 2009, O'Leary began appearing with journalist Amanda Lang on CBC News Network's The Lang and O'Leary Exchange. During a segment of The Lang & O'Leary Exchange on the Occupy Wall Street protests in 2011, O'Leary criticized Pulitzer Prize-winning journalist Chris Hedges for sounding "like a left-wing nutbar." Hedges said afterward that "it will be the last time" he would appear on the show and compared the CBC to Fox News. CBC's ombudsman found O'Leary's behaviour to be a violation of the public broadcaster's journalistic standards.

In January 2014, on The Lang and O'Leary Exchange, O'Leary remarked,

It's fantastic, and this is a great thing because it inspires everybody, gets them motivation to look up to the one percent and say, 'I want to become one of those people, I'm going to fight hard to get up to the top.' This is fantastic news, and, of course, I applaud it. What can be wrong with this? I celebrate capitalism. Don't tell me that you want to redistribute wealth again, that's never gonna happen... Redistribution of wealth doesn't work, we tried it in the Soviet Union, North Korea, would you like to live there?

O'Leary later clarified these statements, saying,

No I don't think poverty is fantastic. I don't think income disparity is fantastic. What I think is how successful capitalism has been over the last hundred years reducing poverty and reducing income disparity. In the last 30 years the number of people living on this globe in extreme poverty has been reduced from 42% down to 17%. Amanda, I want you to thank capitalism for that, because that's how it happened.

=== Other projects ===
In 2009, O'Leary hosted a Winnipeg Comedy Festival gala called Savings & Groans in which he performed a Dragon's Den style sketch in which Sean Cullen and Ron Sparks tried to get him to invest in their invention – the wheel. The show aired on CBC in 2010.

O'Leary co-produced and hosted the 2012 reality show Redemption Inc., which aired for one season on CBC, in which ten ex-convicts competed to have O'Leary fund their business idea. Having also been a co-host of SqueezePlay on Bell Media's Business News Network (BNN), he returned to the Discovery Channel on September 1, 2014, to join as a contributor for its radio and television stations such as CTV.

On May 5, 2015, O'Leary made an appearance on the game show Celebrity Jeopardy and received $10,000 for his charity despite finishing 3rd and in negative points after both Double Jeopardy and Final Jeopardy rounds. In September that year, O'Leary appeared as a celebrity judge in the 95th Miss America pageant.

In 2016, he was a member of ARHT Media's Board of Advisors.

In 2018 O'Leary hosted the podcast Ask Mr. Wonderful for seven episodes. In 2019, he began posting videos on YouTube, again under the title "Ask Mr. Wonderful".

In 2021, O'Leary appeared with Katie Phang and Ada Pozo on CNBC's Money Court, where they adjudicated financial disputes.

O'Leary made his acting debut in the 2025 movie Marty Supreme. He plays Milton Rockwell, a pen magnate who invites protagonist Marty Mauser (Timothée Chalamet) to participate in an exhibition ping pong game.

== Filmography ==
=== Film ===
Year	Title	Role
2025	Marty Supreme	Milton Rockwell
2026	The Breadwinner	Himself

== Political activity ==
In January 2016, O'Leary offered to invest $1 million in the economy of Alberta in exchange for the resignation of Premier Rachel Notley and appeared with four other prospective leadership candidates at a conference for federal Conservatives in late February 2016, where he gave a presentation titled "If I Run, This is How." During his speech, he predicted that the Liberal government would fall within four years of economic collapse.

=== 2017 federal Conservative Party leadership race ===
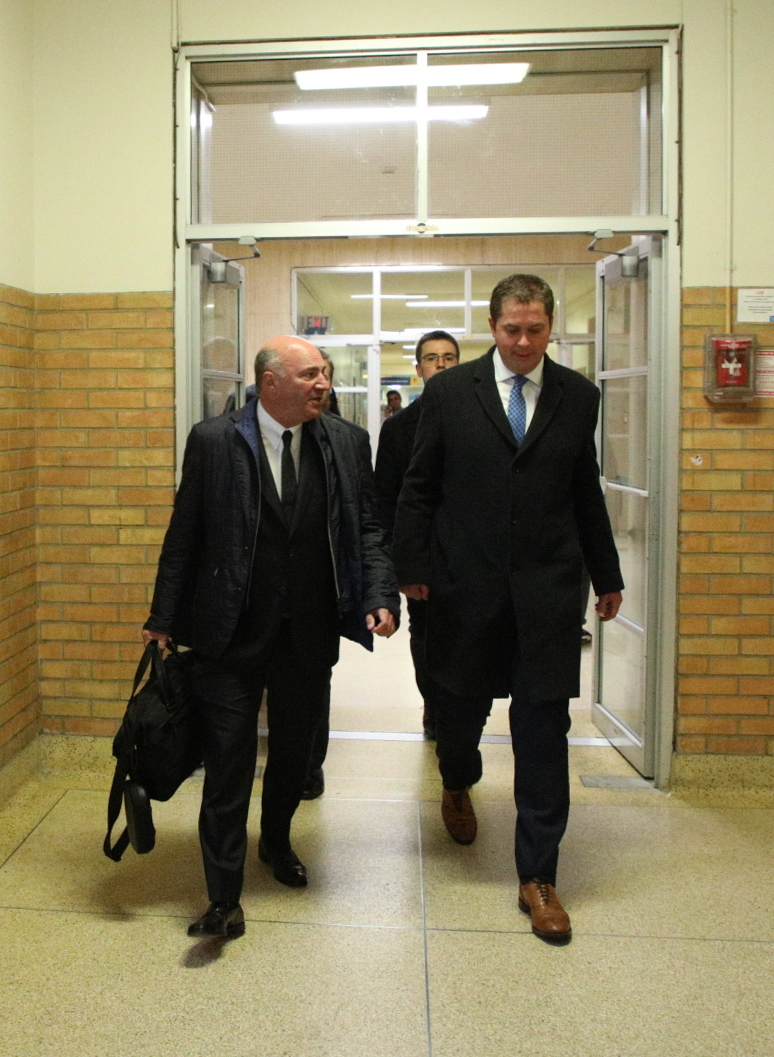
O'Leary with Andrew Scheer in 2018

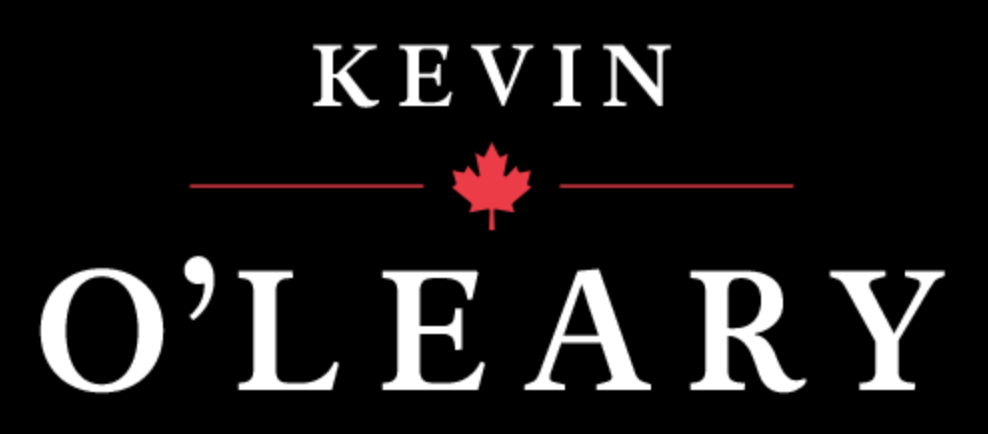
Campaign logo

Following Stephen Harper's resignation as leader of the Conservative Party of Canada, O'Leary attended Conservative Party gatherings in February and May 2016, leading to public speculation about whether he would run for the 2017 leadership election.

In February 2016, Maxime Bernier, a Conservative politician from Quebec, criticized O'Leary, calling him a "tourist" for wanting to be prime minister without being able to speak French. Bernier later explained that he wanted all leadership candidates to learn French and praised his fellow leadership contender Lisa Raitt, who was trying to improve her French. O'Leary stated that he was taking French lessons, and he promised to learn French in time for the next federal election.

On January 18, 2017, O'Leary officially entered the Conservative leadership race. That same day, his former Dragons' Den co-star Arlene Dickinson stated that she found O'Leary to be too "self-interested and opportunistic" to be qualified for the office of prime minister. In response, another former Dragons' Den co-star, W. Brett Wilson, endorsed O'Leary, highlighting differences between O'Leary as a businessman and his TV persona.

On February 1, 2017, O'Leary posted a video of himself shooting in a Miami gun range. It was removed from Facebook out of respect for the funeral for three victims of the Quebec City mosque shooting on that day. It was also revealed that he was in New York promoting one of his business ventures when this occurred. O'Leary later apologized for the timing of this post.

He dropped out of the leadership race on April 26, 2017, stating that, though he still thought he could win the leadership election, a lack of support in Quebec meant that it would be difficult for him to beat Trudeau in 2019, and it would thus be "selfish" of him to continue. On dropping out, he endorsed Bernier, another frontrunner for the position. (Andrew Scheer eventually won the leadership election, narrowly edging out Bernier.)

=== Political positions ===
==== Donald Trump support ====
In 2017, O'Leary described hypothetical trade negotiations between US President Donald Trump and Canadian Prime Minister Justin Trudeau as "Godzilla versus Bambi".

During the 2024 U.S. presidential election, O'Leary criticized Democratic presidential candidate Kamala Harris, citing her plan to increase corporate taxes. During the campaign, O'Leary also defended Trump for bank fraud, suggesting that it was a victimless crime. After Donald Trump won the election, O'Leary said he was very happy with the outcome and that he was "very proud of the work [he] did" during the campaign.

Amid President Donald Trump's threats in 2025 to impose 25% tariffs on Canadian goods and annex Canada, O'Leary visited Trump at his Mar-a-Lago resort. O'Leary also supported making Canada part of the United States and said, "Think about the power of combining the two economies."

==== Economy and trade ====
O'Leary supports multilateral free trade agreements such as the North American Free Trade Agreement. O'Leary believes corporate tax rates in Canada are too high and has promised to eliminate the national carbon tax. O'Leary has threatened to punish provinces by withholding transfer payments if they do not eliminate their respective carbon taxes. O'Leary is a critic of deficit spending and supports eliminating the national debt.

O'Leary opposes control of the CRTC over Canada's telecommunications system.

He has accused Rep. Alexandria Ocasio-Cortez, a New York politician, of "killing jobs by the thousands," citing higher corporate taxes which she favors.

O'Leary supports the Trump administration's Liberation Day tariffs policy and has called for increasing United States' tariffs on China to 400%.

==== Labor rights ====
O'Leary opposes right to disconnect legislation, which gives employees the legal right not to respond to work-related communications outside of working hours. O'Leary has advocated for employers not hiring people who participated in pro-Palestinian protests, saying that "these people are screwed" and that employers could use AI to identify protesters during background checks of prospective employees.

==== Energy ====
O'Leary supports building a pipeline from the Athabasca oil sands to Eastern Canada with the intention of making Canada "energy independent". He has criticized Canada's reliance on Saudi Arabia for oil and gas. He has stated he would support a national referendum on the issue of pipelines.

==== Social ====
O'Leary describes his social policies as "very liberal". He supports same-sex marriage. O'Leary supports the legalization and regulation of marijuana.

O'Leary supports assisted suicide and cited Switzerland as a model for Canada to follow.

==== Foreign and military policy ====
O'Leary supported ending Canadian airstrikes on ISIS and supports taking a peacekeeping role in the Syrian Civil War.

In 2017, O'Leary described Russia as "neither an ally nor a foe" in an interview with the CBC.

O'Leary has criticized Justin Trudeau's procurement plan. He supports purchasing aerial combat drones to defend Canadian airspace and supports phasing out the use of the Lockheed CP-140 Aurora citing cost reasons. He has criticized the lack of funding of the Canadian Armed Forces and supports spending the NATO recommended 2% of GDP on military expenditures.

==== Immigration ====
O'Leary has proposed creating a "fast track" for citizenship for immigrants who graduate from college or university and find employment, as well as for their spouses and children.

O'Leary has advocated for increased border security in order to tackle the issue of irregular border crossing.

==== Senate ====
In a 2017 interview with Evan Solomon, O'Leary suggested that Senators should pay money every year, instead of being paid, thus turning "a cost centre to Canada" into "a profit centre."

=== Leadership debt and lawsuit ===
In November 2018, O'Leary hired lawyer Joseph Groia and sued Elections Canada and Canada's federal elections commissioner over campaign finance laws which limited candidates to spending only $25,000 of their own money for their leadership campaign. At the time of the lawsuit, O'Leary still owed $430,000 to creditors. O'Leary had proposed to Elections Canada that he pay off the debt now with his own money and fundraise the money later, but was rebuffed, since this would be illegal. O'Leary publicly stated that the law promoted mediocrity since rich people would be discouraged from running and hurt the businesses that had pledged money for his failed leadership campaign.

In O'Leary's legal submissions, he argued that the laws preventing the use of personal money over $25,000 were a restriction of his Section 2 Charter right to free expression and the threat of jail time in those laws violated his Section 7 Charter right to security of the person.

== Personal life ==
O'Leary is Catholic. He and his wife, Linda (née Greer), have been married since 1990. The couple separated in 2011, but they resumed their marriage after two years. They have two children, Trevor and Savannah. In a 2016 interview, O'Leary stated: "In a successful growing business, it eats your time alive. Then later in life, you can provide for your family things that many others can't have. But because you sacrificed, you're then given the reward of freedom."

The O'Learys live in Miami Beach and Toronto. He also maintains a cottage in Muskoka, Ontario, as well as homes in Boston and Geneva, Switzerland. In a 2022 CNBC interview, he mentioned that he has obtained a United Arab Emirates citizenship in order to be able to partner with Emiratis on investments.

O'Leary is a fan of the New England Patriots football team and claims to watch all of their games, even when he is traveling around the world and games occur during the middle of the night. He is a wine aficionado and belongs to the Confrérie des Chevaliers du Tastevin, an international association of Burgundy wine enthusiasts. He is also a lifelong photographer and has exhibited and sold prints of his photographs, donating the proceeds to charity. O'Leary is also an avid watch collector and expert, sharing his insights on both Shark Tank and social media. He is known for wearing signature red watch bands and frequently wears two watches simultaneously, stating his belief that a watch loses its soul if it is not worn.

On August 24, 2019, O'Leary and his wife Linda were involved in a fatal crash on Lake Joseph in Muskoka, Ontario, when they were on a boat owned by O'Leary and allegedly operated at the time by Linda. The O'Learys' boat collided with another one and a 64-year-old man and 48-year-old woman on that vessel were killed. O'Leary said in a statement that he was cooperating with the police investigation and that the other boat did not have its lights on and "fled the scene". The police stated that both boats left the scene to "attend a location and both parties called 911." On September 24, Linda O'Leary was charged with "careless operation of a vessel" under the small vessel regulations of the Canada Shipping Act, a charge that carries maximum 18 months imprisonment and a $10,000 fine. The pilot of the other boat, Richard Ruh of Orchard Park, New York, was charged with "failing to exhibit navigation light while underway". On October 11, the Public Prosecution Service of Canada ruled out jail time for Linda. On September 14, 2021, Linda was found not guilty of careless operation of the vessel. A series of lawsuits over the crash were settled in 2026. The settlement terms were confidential, but the National Post has written of the settlement, "the total payout from both boat operators involved in the collision to all the 14 claimants could not have exceeded a combined $2 million; no single operator paid more than half of that; and two of the claimants — both children seeking damages for the death of their mother — were each paid $100,000 minus a $25,000 cut paid to their lawyers, not including taxes and fees."

== See also ==
- List of University of Waterloo people
