= Sally Armstrong =

Sally Armstrong may refer to:

- Sally Armstrong (The Bill), a character from British TV series, The Bill
- Sally Armstrong (journalist) (born 1943), Canadian journalist and author
- Sally Armstrong, character in Dark Eyes (audio drama)
