= Amanda Lang =

Canadian business journalist

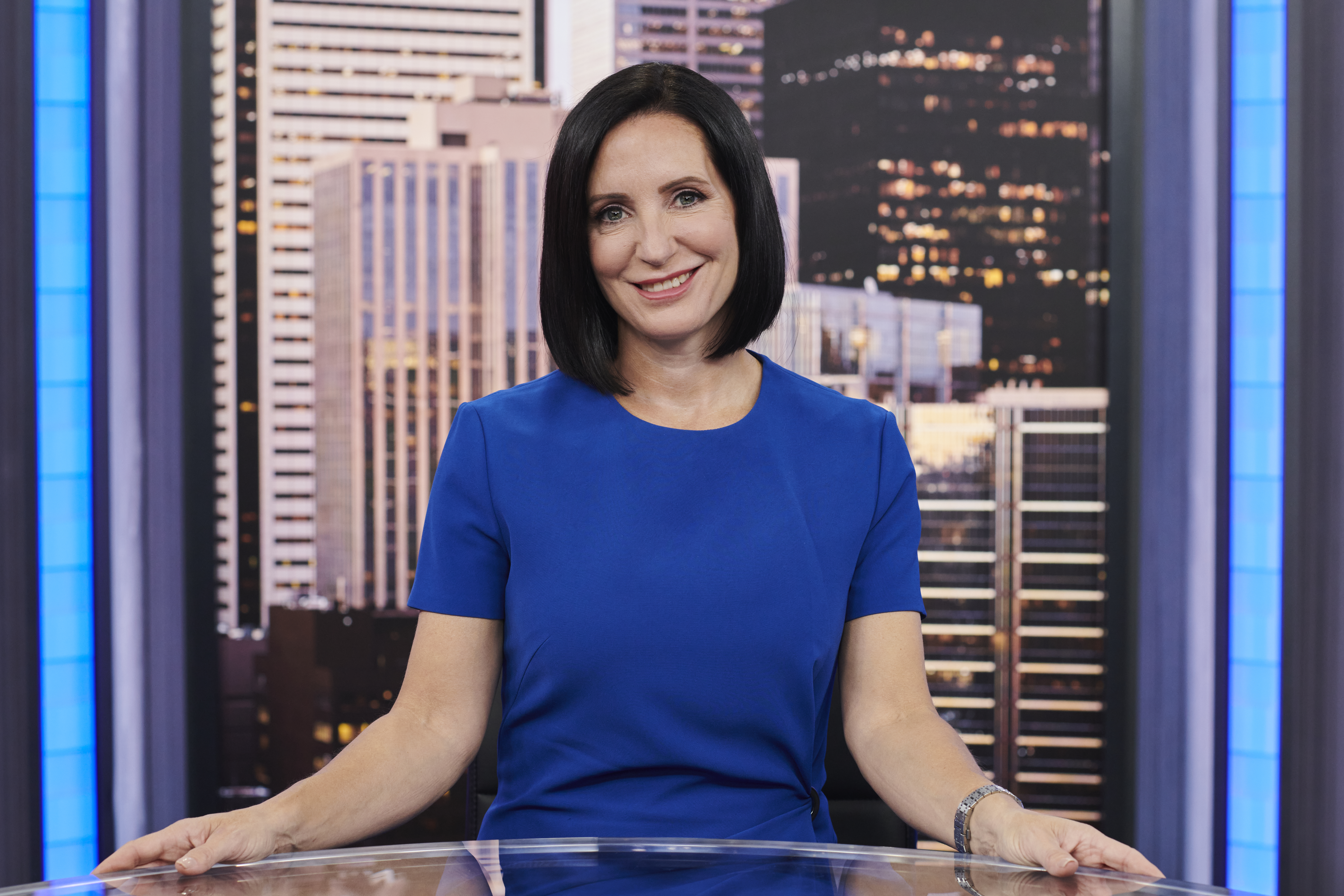
- Born: 31 October 1970 (age 55); Ottawa, Ontario, Canada
- Education: St. Mary's Academy
- Alma mater: University of Manitoba
- Occupations: Chief Financial Correspondent; News Anchor; Author
- Known for: The Exchange with Amanda Lang; Bloomberg North
- Spouse: Geoff Beattie
- Children: 1
- Parent(s): Otto Lang and Adrian Macdonald
- Relatives: Anthony Merchant (uncle); Sally Merchant (grandmother); Vincent Reynolds Smith (great-grandfather); Pana Merchant (aunt)

Amanda Lang (born 31 October 1970) is a Canadian business journalist, chief financial correspondent for CTV News, and host of Taking Stock, a weekly business news program on CTV, BNN Bloomberg and CP24. Previously, she was the host of Bloomberg North on Bloomberg TV Canada. Lang was formerly senior business correspondent for CBC News, where she anchored The Exchange with Amanda Lang daily on CBC News Network. Prior to her work with CBC, she worked as a print journalist for Canadian national newspapers and was an anchor for CNNfn and BNN.

== Early life and personal life ==
Lang's father is Otto Lang, a Liberal party MP and federal cabinet member during the 1960s and 1970s. Lang's stepfather, Donald Stovel Macdonald, was also a federal Liberal Cabinet member.

Lang is one of six siblings, including her identical twin sister, Adrian Lang, an executive at Staples Canada, Elisabeth Lang, the Superintendent of Bankruptcy of Canada, and Timothy Lang, a non-profit leader. She is an avid reader, runner and cyclist.

Lang attended St Mary's Academy, a private Catholic girls' school in Winnipeg, Manitoba. She later studied architecture at the University of Manitoba.

== Journalism career ==
=== Early career ===
Lang began her journalism career in print at The Globe and Mail in the InfoGlobe unit.

She then moved to the National Post (then the Financial Post) as their New York correspondent.

=== Switch to television ===
She got her start in television with what was then RoBTV (now BNN) in 1999, in New York, before moving to CNN in 2000 where she reported from the New York Stock Exchange for American Morning, and anchored programs on CNN's then-financial network, CNNfn.

In 2002, she returned to CTV and RoBTV, before anchoring Squeezeplay with Kevin O'Leary and The Commodities Report in 2003.

Lang left SqueezePlay and BNN in July 2009.

=== Move to CBC ===
In 2010, Lang and O'Leary moved to CBC and launched The Lang & O'Leary Exchange. Upon O'Leary's departure in 2014, the show was rebranded as The Exchange with Amanda Lang.

While at the CBC, Lang's coverage ranged from the Occupy Movement, to the high-profile NSA leak by Edward Snowden, to questions of increasing wealth inequality.

In 2010, Lang won a Gemini award in the category of Best Host or Interviewer in a News Information Program or Series. Other nominees included Heather Hiscox of CBC News Now and Erica Johnson of Marketplace.

During her time at CBC Lang also worked as Senior Business Correspondent reporting for The National.

Her book, The Power of Why, came out in 2012. Touted as a possible successor for Peter Mansbridge on The National, the 42-year-old Lang made Toronto Life's 2012 '50 Most Influential People in Toronto' annual list.

=== CTV/Bell Media ===
Lang became a host of Bloomberg TV Canada's Bloomberg North in early-2016. Following the September 2017 wind-down of the network, Bell Media hired Lang once again for Business News Network (which had announced that it would become a co-branded franchise of Bloomberg Television, BNN Bloomberg), where she co-hosted Bloomberg Markets as part of a co-production arrangement for the program.

Since 2025, Lang has been the chief financial correspondent for CTV News, appearing across several Bell/CTV platforms including CTV National News, BNN Bloomberg, CTV News Channel, and CP24. She has hosted the weekly show Taking Stock on BNN Bloomberg since 2022.

== Community involvement ==
=== Chair, Covenant House ===
Lang served as a member of the board of directors at Covenant House from 2017 to 2024, including as board chair.

Covenant House is the largest agency in Canada serving homeless and at-risk youth, working to provide care for young people who have experienced homelessness and sex trafficking. The charity has supported more than 100,000 young people since its founding in 1982.

During Lang's board tenure, the charity expanded its support of education around human trafficking and undertook a major strategic review of its priorities.

=== Munk School ===
Lang is a senior fellow at the Munk School of Global Affairs at the University of Toronto, which primarily offers master's degrees in global affairs and public policy.

== Writing ==
In 2012, Lang published her first book, The Power of Why: Simple Questions That Lead to Success. In the book, she argues that curiosity can be harnessed to drive innovation and change not just in business, but in our personal lives. The book received positive reviews with high-profile individuals like Peter Mansbridge and David Chilton offering praise.

In 2013, the book was shortlisted for the National Business Book Award.

In 2017 she published her second book, The Beauty of Discomfort: How What We Avoid Is What We Need, where she argues that successful people tend to embrace and seek out discomfort. She illustrates this theory with stories of a wide range of successful individuals including business leaders and professional athletes.

== Conflict of interest controversies ==
=== NDP ===
In 2011, Lang hosted a panel on CBC's The National where she was assigned to determine the credibility of then NDP leader Jack Layton's election platform. It was not disclosed to the viewing audience that her brother, Andrew Lang, was running against Layton for the Liberal Party in the riding of Toronto—Danforth. CBC's Ombudsman reported that, "There was nothing problematic about Lang's reporting in the campaign," however the report raised concerns about perceived conflicts, stating that, "it was not possible to compartmentalize Lang's reporting on NDP policy from Layton's qualities as a leader and credentials to be supported as a candidate. Any of her campaign reporting even indirectly intersecting with the Liberals or NDP could have been perceived as conflicted."

According to the Ombudsman's response, Mark Harrison, the executive producer of The National, noted that, "the feature in question did not focus on Layton, but was a broad segment on how the NDP was going to finance its promises." He also noted that "the reporting decision was not Lang's, but the program's senior editors."

=== Manulife and Sun Life ===
In December 2014, media website Canadaland reported evidence that earlier that year Lang had provided favorable CBC coverage to two companies, Manulife and Sun Life, without disclosing to viewers that each company had recently paid her for speaking engagements. Lang's speaking engagements were disclosed on the CBC's website.

=== Royal Bank of Canada ===
In January 2015, Canadaland ran stories noting that Lang participated in the coverage of the Royal Bank of Canada during its temporary foreign worker program scandal, including interviewing the then-CEO of the bank Gord Nixon, while having done speaking engagements at RBC sponsored events, promoting her own book, which featured a back cover endorsement from Nixon without disclosing she was in a relationship with a board member of the bank.

In the wake of the RBC stories, George Monbiot, a columnist for The Guardian, wrote on 20 January 2015, "It amazes me that [Lang] remains employed by CBC." John Doyle, a columnist for the Toronto The Globe and Mail, wrote on 23 January "It's time for Lang to get down off her high horse and go away. This is about the CBC's reputation, not hers, which is already in tatters."

On 22 January 2015, the CBC announced it had banned on-air talent from accepting paid speaking engagements. Later that day, Lang conceded in a piece in The Globe and Mail that she should have made on-air disclosures about her connection to RBC and stated that she agreed with the speaking engagement ban.

Jennifer McGuire, the general manager and editor-in-chief of CBC News, launched an investigation of Lang's reporting on RBC that analyzed her coverage since 2013. The review showed no evidence of bias. Ms. McGuire also noted that, according to an external review conducted by Cormex, a media research firm, Lang's coverage of the banking sector showed "no evidence of partiality."

== Publications ==
- The Power of Why: Simple Questions That Lead to Success (2012)
- The Beauty of Discomfort: How What We Avoid Is What We Need (2017)

== Filmography ==
=== Television ===
Year	Title	Role	Notes
2011-2012	George Stroumboulopoulos Tonight	Herself	4 episodes
2013	The National	Herself - Senior Business Correspondent	
2013-2014	The Lang & O'Leary Exchange	Herself - Host	
2018	The Marilyn Denis Show	Herself	2 episodes
2022	Question Period	Herself - BNN Bloomberg	
2023	Power Play with Vassy Kapelos	Herself - Host of BNN Bloomberg's Taking Stock	Episode: "Fall Economic Statement"
2022-present	Taking Stock	Herself - Host	
