= Anthony Merchant =

Canadian politician (1944–2025)

Anthony Merchant KC

Member of the Legislative Assembly for Regina Wascana
- In office 1975–1978
- Preceded by: Henry Baker
- Succeeded by: Clinton Oliver White

Personal details
- Born: October 19, 1944 Yorkton, Saskatchewan, Canada
- Died: October 13, 2025 (aged 80) Regina, Saskatchewan, Canada
- Party: Liberal
- Spouse: Pana Merchant
- Relations: Vincent Reynolds Smith (grandfather); Sally Merchant (mother); Otto Lang (brother-in-law); Amanda Lang (niece)
- Education: University of Saskatchewan
- Occupation: Lawyer

Evatt Francis Anthony Merchant KC (October 19, 1944 – October 13, 2025) was a Canadian lawyer, businessman and politician. His law firm Merchant Law Group LLP, which he founded in 1986, is best known for representing former students of Indian residential schools in the $1.9 billion Indian Residential School Settlement in 2006, the largest class-action settlement in Canadian history. Prior to founding his law firm, Merchant represented Regina Wascana in the Legislative Assembly of Saskatchewan as a Liberal member. Merchant was named a Queen's Counsel in 1995.

== Background ==
Evatt Francis Anthony Merchant was born Yorkton, Saskatchewan on October 19, 1944, and was raised by his mother. He studied arts and law at the University of Saskatchewan and business administration at the University of Regina. He was later in the navy. Merchant was admitted to the Saskatchewan bar in 1968, to the Alberta bar in 1976, to the British Columbia bar in 1977 and to the Arizona bar in 1987. He was also host for an open-line radio show in Saskatchewan and a freelance television interviewer with the CBC. In 1975, he was the elected as a Liberal member of the Saskatchewan legislature. In 1976, he was a candidate for the leadership of the provincial Liberal party. That post went instead to Ted Malone. Merchant later tried and failed to run for federal office in 1979 and 1980.

He was a fifth generation lawyer. His maternal grandfather was Saskatchewan politician Vincent Reynolds Smith, later a judge. Merchant's father, Captain Evatt Francis Anthony Merchant, was a member of C Company of the Queen's Own Cameron Highlanders. He was killed in action towards the end of hostilities in WWII, just after Merchant was born. Merchant's mother, Sally Merchant, was a television personality who later also became a member of the Saskatchewan legislature.

== Professional career ==
Merchant's law firm—Merchant Law Group—dealt with over seven thousand claims, through trials and appeals of Indigenous peoples in Canada, who had been students in the Canadian Indian residential school system—a system which closed its last schools in 1996.

The law firm reportedly obtained more than $25 million in legal fees in the settlement.

== Controversy ==
=== Colin Thatcher trial ===
In 1983, Merchant became involved in the murder trial of Colin Thatcher, a Canadian politician from Saskatchewan who was eventually convicted of murdering his ex-wife, JoAnne Wilson. Merchant was convicted of criminal mischief and reprimanded by the Law Society of Saskatchewan (LSS) for an incident that evolved after Merchant visited the home where Ms. Wilson and Mr. Thatcher's daughter was residing and demanded that the daughter be surrendered to Mr. Thatcher after he murdered his wife. Additionally, Merchant testified at the trial of Mr. Thatcher as a defense witness. Merchant claimed that he had retained certain telephone records relating to calls from himself to Mr. Thatcher after Ms. Wilson was shot, but that there were several unexplained break-ins that resulted in the theft of the records. In his testimony, Merchant implied that the police were looking for the records and may have been behind the break-ins. Merchant subsequently changed his testimony to state that the break-ins had occurred before Mr. Thatcher was arrested, which resulting in the trial judge giving a specific jury instruction in relation to the reliability of Merchant's evidence.

=== Law Society Disciplinary Sanctions ===
Merchant had been disciplined by the LSS with a three-month suspension from practicing law in 2012 in relation to a residential school claim.

In January 2022, the Saskatchewan Court of Appeal dismissed a proposed citation and ruled that Merchant had not contravened Law Society regulations.

=== 2013 offshore leaks ===
Merchant's name appeared in documents released as part of the Offshore Leaks, a 2013 leak of documents related to offshore accounts that predated the similar 2016 Panama Papers and 2017 Paradise Papers.

The documents revealed that Merchant had transferred $1.7 million into offshore havens. A note in the files stated that the writer had "[r]eceived a letter from Mr. Merchant requesting that we do not disclose now or in the future any information to the authorities in Luxembourg, or anywhere".

== Personal life and death ==
Merchant had three sons, all of whom are lawyers. His brother-in-law is Otto Lang, a federal Liberal politician and the former attorney general. His niece is Amanda Lang, a television personality. Merchant was married to Pana Merchant, a Liberal senator (2002–2017).

Merchant died at his home in Regina, Saskatchewan, on October 13, 2025, at the age of 80, from cancer.

== Awards ==
In 2007, Merchant was voted the best lawyer in Regina by the Prairie Dog Magazine. Merchant was named a Queen's Counsel in 1995.
