= Who We Are: A Citizen's Manifesto =

2009 book by Rudyard Griffiths

Who We Are
- First edition cover
- Author: Rudyard Griffiths
- Original title: Who We Are: A Citizen's Manifesto
- Language: English
- Genre: Non-fiction
- Publisher: Douglas & McIntyre
- Publication date: 2009-03-10
- Publication place: Canada
- Media type: Print (Hardcover)
- Pages: 214
- ISBN: 1-55365-124-3
- OCLC: 277067450

Who We Are: A Citizen's Manifesto is a 2009 book by Rudyard Griffiths. In it, Griffiths argues that Canada has become a "postmodern state"—a nation that downplays its history and makes few demands on its citizens, allowing them to find their allegiances where they may, in their region, their ethnic group or the language they speak. According to Griffiths the notion of a national identity, with shared responsibilities and a common purpose, is considered out of date, even a disadvantage in a world of transnational economies, resurgent regions and global immigration. Griffiths argues that this vision of Canada is an intellectual and practical dead end. Without a strong national identity and robust civic values, the country will be hard pressed to meet the daunting challenges that lie ahead: the social costs of an aging population, the unavoidable effects of global warming and the fallout of a dysfunctional immigration system. Griffiths calls for a rediscovery of the founding principles that made Canada the nation it is today and why a loyalty beyond the local and personal is essential to Canada's survival.

== Synopsis ==
Who We Are challenges the idea that Canada's essence is its diversity and lack of a single "national" story. In Griffith's characterization of this view, the indeterminacy of the Canadian identity — the lack of a single answer to the question "who are we?" — is Canada's comparative advantage in a world of globalization and diffused power. In Canada, the world's pre-eminent "postnational" state, national identity plays second fiddle to ethnic and regional loyalties, and citizenship is a ticket to entitlements, demanding very little in the way of shared responsibilities. Griffiths argues that this idea is mistaken and potentially harmful. Canada, along with other advanced democracies, is confronting a host of challenges (most notably the effects of climate change, mass migration and an aging population) which require the summoning of a collective will and purpose.

Yet Canadians are disengaging from national institutions and formal politics, volunteering in lower numbers and opting for personalized forms of community and belonging. Unless the nation takes steps to rebuild civic values and a sense of obligation to Canada's founding principles, Griffiths argues, the country's reservoir of social solidarity will run dry — along with its capacity to tackle the gathering "storm."

As co-founder of the Dominion Institute, an organization that promotes Canadian history and civic literacy, Griffiths has worked to address the low levels of knowledge Canadians have about their country's past and its political and social institutions. Who We Are continues this mission, encouraging Canadians to think about their history differently. For Griffiths, the first part of 19th century is particularly significant in understanding "who we are."

During the turbulent decade after the failed rebellions in Upper and Lower Canada, French and English reformers collaborated in the creation of civic institutions and values that made democratic self-government a reality. In the process, the author observes, they "forged an enduring consensus as to whom Canadians should be loyal to and why." The focus was no longer the governor-general and the imperial connection, or a particular religious or ethnic group (French/English, Protestant/Catholic), but rather an experiment in bicultural and democratic politics called Canada. This period also witnessed a "flurry of nation building," everything from non-denominational schools and local government to railways and the telegraph. Griffiths praises these grand, national projects, and draws parallels to another historical moment that defined Canada: the postwar government of Louis St. Laurent.

By embracing multiculturalism and decentralized federalism, Griffith argues, Canada has forgotten the lessons of these earlier periods about citizenship, loyalty and nation-building. Instead, the belief took hold that newcomers to Canada would settle more effectively, and that regional grievances could be addressed more easily, if the country was seen to be made up of many equal identities, without an overarching creed.

Griffiths's reading of history, by contrast, leads him to conclude that Canada is a political community, based on shared democratic values and institutions rather than on ethnicity, region or language. It is, in short, "a nation of citizens, not a collection of communities." And it is a revitalized citizenship that he contends will save Canada from the empty promises of postnationalism.

== Criticism ==
Some of Who We Are's proposals for kick-starting Canada's civic values are straightforward and draw on the experience of other societies: a new citizenship exam and mandatory language training for newcomers; increased government spending to integrate immigrants; and a national civics exam for graduating high-school students. Others, however, such as mandatory civic service and voting, are more controversial and reflect a particular philosophy about the boundaries of community in a globalized age. Indeed, while Griffiths accuses others of adopting a "20th-century mindset," Who We Are sometimes suffers from the same affliction.

The best example is his critique of the benefits enjoyed by non-resident Canadian citizens, and his recommendation that Canada annul the citizenship of those Canadians who voluntarily acquire the citizenship of another country. Griffiths writes that citizenship should be "earned through physical settlement" and an active contribution to the "economic and social betterment of the community." Dual citizenship is the enemy that corrodes social solidarity.

More evidence is needed for this latter assertion. Not all dual citizens are "hedging their bets" about Canada's future, and many of them are capable of managing their different allegiances. Furthermore, the solutions to the challenges Griffiths identifies are international as well as national — a reality that makes global knowledge and expertise relevant factors in addressing them.

While Who We Are doesn't present all the answers, it opens up an important debate.

== Reviews ==
In The Globe and Mail, Jennifer Welsh's book review said:

...Who We Are's diagnosis of the postnational predicament is compelling, refreshing and highly relevant...in writing this book, Griffiths distinguishes himself as one of the very best Canadians of his generation.

— The Globe and Mail,

In Policy Options, James Allan Evans' book review said:

The main section of Who We Are is a brilliant snapshot of Canadian national development. I agree with Griffiths that Canada is a product of its history, and we shall lose Canada's spiritual wellbeing if we forget it..

— Policy Options,

In The Walrus, Daniel Baird's book review said:

Who We Are is a bold and sometimes provocative book: while rejecting crude nationalism, Griffiths insists that multicultural Canada in a complicated, often volatile world is best served by a more robust idea of citizenship and a stronger allegiance to its traditions and institutions.

— The Walrus,

In the National Post, George Jonas' book review said:

Who We Are: A Citizen's Manifesto isn't only about who we are but also about who, in Griffiths opinion, we ought to be. The young public intellectual is a Canadian patriot, 21st century style. He makes a convincing case…

— National Post,
