= Vincent Reynolds Smith =

Canadian politician (1890–1960)

Vincent Reynolds Smith (December 18, 1890 – May 3, 1960) was a lawyer and political figure in Saskatchewan. He represented Yorkton from 1934 to 1938 in the Legislative Assembly of Saskatchewan as a Liberal.

== Life and career ==
Smith was born in Amherst, Nova Scotia, the son of Charles Reynolds Smith and Mary Gavin, and was educated at St. Francis Xavier University and Dalhousie University. His brother Robert Knowlton Smith was also a politician, serving in the House of Commons of Canada from 1925 to 1935. He opened a law practice in Regina in 1914, later moving to Yorkton. In 1915, Smith married Rita Fitzgerald. Smith was defeated by Alan Carl Stewart when he ran for reelection to the assembly in 1938. He was a prominent member of the Knights of Columbus, founding the Yorkton Council and serving as its first Grand Knight. In 1944, Smith was named a district court judge, serving first in Kerrobert, then Saskatoon. He died in Vancouver, British Columbia at the age of 69.

His daughter, Sally Merchant, and her son – his grandson, Tony Merchant both served in the Saskatchewan assembly. His great-granddaughter is television personality Amanda Lang.
