= Bloomberg TV Indonesia =

24-hour business news channel in Indonesia

- Country: Indonesia
- Broadcast area: Indonesia
- Headquarters: The City Tower, 9th floor, Jl. M.H. Thamrin no. 81. Jakarta

Programming
- Language: Indonesian
- Picture format: 16:9 (720p, HDTV)

Ownership
- Owner: Idea Karya Indonesia
- Sister channels: Depok TV and channels included on CTV Network

History
- Launched: 11 July 2013
- Closed: 31 August 2015

Links
- Website: www.bloombergindonesia.tv

Bloomberg TV Indonesia was a 24-hour Indonesian language business news channel that operated from 2013 to 2015. Licensed from Bloomberg L.P. and produced in cooperation with Bloomberg Television, it was Indonesia's first international business channel broadcasting fully in Indonesian, targeting the country's growing middle class, entrepreneurs, and investors.

== History ==
Plans for the channel emerged in early 2013, driven by Bloomberg's view that Indonesia was a rapidly growing economy with strong demand for business information. The station was designed to broadcast 24 hours a day with 80 percent of programming centered on macroeconomics and the remainder on stock market news, while adopting Bloomberg's global standards of accuracy, speed, and data-driven reporting.

Bloomberg TV Indonesia officially launched on 11 July 2013 on the pay-TV platform First Media. Idea Karya Indonesia held a five-year license to operate the channel, with major shareholders including Sandiaga Uno and Rosan Roeslani. Its distribution strategy relied on pay-TV and digital platforms to reach an upper-middle-class audience accustomed to subscription services, alongside planned collaborations with local stations.

The newsroom was staffed by senior journalists and initially gained traction with original programming such as Start Up, one of the first Indonesian TV shows highlighting the local startup ecosystem. The channel was even considered to host one of the 2014 presidential debates but declined to preserve editorial independence.

By late 2014, internal issues surfaced as senior staff departed, reducing local production to about 20 percent and increasing reliance on repackaged Bloomberg International content. Bosowa Group was later reported to be considering an acquisition. Financial difficulties persisted, and the channel ceased operations on 31 August 2015.

== Programming ==
Bloomberg TV Indonesia combined locally produced business and economic news with selected programming from Bloomberg Television. It aired around eight to ten hours of live news daily, covering markets, corporate developments, and economic policy.

Other programs focused on entrepreneurship, financial education, and industry insights. The flagship original show, Start Up, introduced Indonesian audiences to the concept of startup businesses and profiled local founders. The rest of its schedule included adapted Bloomberg International content supported by real-time data and analytics.
