= Books with Wings =

Philanthropic educational organisation

Books With Wings
- Official logo
- Type: Philanthropic, non-profit, non-governmental organisation
- Purpose: Provision of books for students in Afghanistan
- Headquarters: University of Manitoba, Canada
- Location: Afghanistan, Canada, United Kingdom, United States
- Founder: Richard Gordon
- Website: Official website (archived)

Books With Wings is a philanthropic educational organisation, based at the University of Manitoba, Canada. It is a collaborative project between Canadian and American students and their counterparts in Afghanistan to provide books for universities throughout Afghanistan. A United Kingdom Chapter was formed in 2015.

== History ==
The organisation was founded by Dr. Richard (Dick) Gordon, a professor of radiology at the University of Manitoba. The program began as a class project at the university's medical school, and the organization began shipping books to Afghanistan in 2001.

Books sent to Afghanistan were originally mainly medical and science textbooks, but the range later expanded to include material covering multiple disciplines such as accounting, business, computer science, education, engineering, English, history, law, literature, mathematics, medicine, midwifery, public health and science.

Sally Armstrong provided critical support to Books With Wings, and devoted half a chapter of one of her books to it.

Shipment of most books was via Canadian Armed Forces and, except for one shipment of 32,000 books by The Idries Shah Foundation distributed by Books With Wings, shipments ceased when they withdrew from Afghanistan. According to founder, Richard Gordon, Books With Wings is currently inactive because they no longer have any mechanism to transport books.
