= Bloomberg Television =

Financial and business cable news channel

- Country: United States

Programming
- Language: English
- Picture format: 1080i (Note: A 4K feed is supplied by the Samsung TV Plus platform.)

Ownership
- Owner: Michael Bloomberg (88%) and Bank of America (12%; through Merrill Lynch)
- Parent: Bloomberg L.P.
- Sister channels: See channels

History
- Launched: June 1994; 32 years ago
- Former names: Bloomberg Direct (1994–1995); Bloomberg Information TV (1995–1997)

Links
- Webcast: www.bloomberg.com/live/
- Website: www.bloomberg.com

Bloomberg Television (on-air as Bloomberg) is an American business news channel focusing on business and capital market programming, owned by diversified information and media private company Bloomberg L.P. It is distributed globally, reaching over 310 million homes worldwide. It is headquartered in New York City, with European headquarters in London and Asian headquarters in Hong Kong (Greater China and Northeast Asia) and Singapore (ASEAN Region), respectively.

== History ==
Bloomberg Television first launched in the United States in mid-1994 under the name Bloomberg Direct and was first carried on the then new satellite television service DirecTV. Within a year it was renamed Bloomberg Information TV, before it was shortened to its current name in 1997. The network has taken over the channel space of the-defunct Financial News Network, as well as hiring most of the former FNN workforce. Shortly after Bloomberg's launch, the now-defunct American Independent Network carried a simulcast of the channel at various times each weekday from 1995 to 1997, which was picked up by some broadcast stations in early morning periods to provide a de facto morning business show. Starting on July 1, 1995, the network's morning pre-opening bell programming (from 5:30 AM to 7 AM) was also aired on the USA Network, simulcast in a paid programming arrangement with the channel until 2004, when that network dropped the simulcast months before the NBCUniversal merger was consummated, due to concerns that USA would then air the coverage of a competitor to future sister network CNBC. The simulcast then moved to E! (which also became NBCUniversal-owned and sister network of CNBC in January 2011 due to that company's purchase by Comcast), where it remained until the simulcast ended in January 2009, when it was felt it had expanded digital cable footprint enough to discontinue the simulcast. During its time on E!, the 5–8 a.m. block was the most-watched period for the network, according to Nielsen Media Research.

Bloomberg Television's U.S. network debuted a new graphics package in January 2009. This current scheme was first used on the network's now-defunct pre-market program, Starting Bell, before the new graphics expanded to all of the network's programs on February 17, 2009. Also on that date, Bloomberg U.S. revamped its weekday programming lineup (see "Programs on Bloomberg" below).

In October 2009, Bloomberg Television debuted another new graphics package. In 2011, Bloomberg Television announced a strategic relationship with Gas Station TV (GSTV) to deliver personal finance and business news through the LCD screens beginning to proliferate fueling stations (currently, Cheddar is GSTV's business news provider).

Bloomberg launched a high definition simulcast feed on May 9, 2011, with Time Warner Cable as the first provider to carry it. In mid-April 2013, DirecTV started carrying Bloomberg HD.

As of July 2014, Bloomberg Television's standard-definition feed now shows a down-scaled version of its native HD feed, with the 16:9 letterbox picture on its 4:3 SD feed. In May 2020, the network launched a 2160p 4K feed, using the larger screen space to communicate more news and information; it is currently exclusive to Samsung TV Plus, an ad-supported streaming service.

== International channels ==
In February 2009, Bloomberg Television announced that it would cease operating some of the international variations of the channel, placing a greater focus on a more international Bloomberg channel.

On March 9, 2009, the localized channels available in Germany, France, Italy and Spain ceased operations. Today, throughout Europe, the original pan-European version of Bloomberg Europe (International) is available on cable and digital television providers.

Since March 9, 2009, Bloomberg Television utilizes its existing international production teams in Marina Bay Financial Centre (Bloomberg Asia), Petronas Towers, Kuala Lumpur City Centre (Bloomberg Asia), Pacific Place Jakarta (Bloomberg Asia), Europe (Bloomberg Europe) and America (Bloomberg) adding a more global feel to the channel. Bloomberg International provides programming from Marina Bay Financial Centre, Petronas Towers, Kuala Lumpur City Centre and Pacific Place Jakarta in the early morning produced by Bloomberg Asia (International), from London in the late morning produced by Bloomberg Europe (International) and from its main headquarters in New York City in the afternoon. Each Bloomberg receives localized advertising and a relevant business news ticker on screen.

Bloomberg Japan ceased broadcasting on April 30, 2009. The channel was replaced by Bloomberg Asia (International). Bloomberg Japan's Japanese language print newsroom and website continue to operate as normal. In June 2009, the Japanese service began running small on-air segments in cooperation with BS-Fuji Television. In October 2009, segments produced with the Tokyo Broadcasting System were added. Bloomberg Brazil and Bloomberg Latin America were integrated into the global Bloomberg channel during 2009.

Bloomberg is an associate member of the Caribbean Cable & Telecommunications Association and the Caribbean Cable Cooperative.

In November 2011, Bloomberg announced the formation of Bloomberg TV Mongolia in partnership with Trade and Development Bank of Mongolia (TDB), the oldest and one of the largest commercial banks in Mongolia. The channel offers a mix of locally produced, Mongolian language content as well as English language news from Bloomberg Television.

In February 2015, Bloomberg partnered with Canadian media company Channel Zero to form Bloomberg TV Canada, which featured U.S. Bloomberg Television programming and Canadian-produced studio programs produced from Bloomberg's Brookfield Place studio and other Canadian bureaus. The channel replaced the U.S. service on Canadian television providers. The channel shut down in October 2017, after which Bloomberg entered into a partnership with Bell Media's Business News Network (BNN), to co-brand the channel as BNN Bloomberg, and grant the company rights to distribute its television and radio content in Canada. The co-branded service will augment BNN's existing business day programming with additional Bloomberg programs to handle coverage of international markets, and access to its bureaus.

=== Current channels ===
Most of the channels listed are not directly operated by Bloomberg, but are operated by local companies which franchise the Bloomberg brand and may take some of its English-language programming.

- Bloomberg Television (from Bloomberg Tower, Manhattan, New York City)
- Bloomberg El Financiero (from Mexico in Spanish and English)
- Bloomberg TV Malaysia (from Petronas Towers, Kuala Lumpur City Centre in Malay and English)
- Bloomberg Television Asia–Pacific (from Singapore, Tokyo, Seoul and Hong Kong)
- Bloomberg Television Middle East (from Dubai)
- Bloomberg Television Europe (from London)
- Bloomberg HT (from Istanbul in Turkish)
- Bloomberg Television Mongolia (from Ulaanbaatar in Mongolian)
- Bloomberg Television South Asia (from Mumbai)
- Bloomberg Television Australia (from Sydney)
- Bloomberg Television Bulgaria (from Sofia in Bulgarian)
- Bloomberg Television Brazil (from São Paulo)
- BNN Bloomberg

=== Former channels ===
- Bloomberg Brazil (from São Paulo in Portuguese)
- Bloomberg Television Indonesia (from Jakarta in Indonesian)
- Bloomberg Television Canada
- Bloomberg Television India (from New Delhi)
- Bloomberg Germany (in German)
- Bloomberg Television France (in French)
- Bloomberg Italy (in Italian)
- Bloomberg Television Philippines (in English and Filipino)
- Bloomberg Japan (in Japanese)
- Bloomberg Spain (in Spanish)
- Bloomberg Television Africa (launched October 2013, closed in April 2015)

=== United States service ===
Bloomberg's U.S. broadcasts are headed by Justin Smith, the CEO of Bloomberg Media Group. Smith replaced Andy Lack, who eventually returned to NBC News. The network also provided funding and studio facilities for the nightly PBS/WNET program Charlie Rose.

== Programs ==
Live weekday shows

The weekday schedule begins Sunday 6:00pm (New York), 11:00pm (London), 7:00am (Hong Kong/Singapore), 8:00am (Tokyo/Seoul) and 9:00am (Sydney）

The weekend schedule begins on Friday/Saturday at the same times.

=== Bloomberg Television Australia (from Sydney) / Asia–Pacific (from Singapore, Tokyo, Seoul and Hong Kong) ===
New York	London	Hong Kong/ Singapore	Tokyo/ Seoul	Sydney	Program	Anchor	First aired and Off aired
6:00pm-7:59pm	11:00pm-12:59am	7:00am-8:59am	8:00am-9:59am	9:00am-10:59am	Bloomberg The Asia Trade	Regular: Shery Ahn (Tokyo/Seoul) and Avril Hong (Singapore) Alternative: Paul Allen (Sydney)/ Annabelle Droulers (Hong Kong) and Avril Hong (Singapore): In rotation basis for hosting region with subject to operational needs, thus, exceptional combinations would be applied if necessary	23 June 2016; 10 years ago
8:00pm-8:59pm	1:00am-1:59am	9:00am-9:59am	10:00am-10:59am	11:00am-noon	Bloomberg The China Show	David Ingles and Yvonne Man (Hong Kong)	24 February 2019; 7 years ago
9:00pm-10:59pm	2:00am-3:59am	10:00am-11:59am	11:00am-noon	noon-1:00pm	Insight With Haslinda Amin	Haslinda Amin (Singapore)	10 October 2016; 10 years ago

=== Bloomberg Television Middle East (from Dubai) ===
New York	London	UAE	Hong Kong/ Singapore	Tokyo/ Seoul	Sydney	Program	Anchor	First aired
11:00pm-11:59pm	4:00am-4:59am	noon-12:59pm	1:00pm-1:59pm	2:00pm-2:59pm	3:00pm-3:59pm	Horizons Middle East and Africa	Joumanna Bercetche (Dubai)	18 March 2018; 8 years ago

=== Bloomberg London / Bloomberg Television Europe (from London) ===
New York	London	UAE	Hong Kong/ Singapore	Tokyo/ Seoul	Sydney	Program	Anchor	First aired
midnight-12:59am	5:00am-5:59pm	1:00pm-1:59pm	2:00pm-2:59pm	3:00pm-3:59pm	4:00pm-4:59pm	Bloomberg Daybreak: Europe	Tom Mackenzie (London)	24 August 2023; 3 years ago
1:00am-2:59am	6:00am-7:59am	2:00pm-3:59pm	3:00pm-4:59pm	4:00pm-5:59pm	5:00pm-6:59pm	Bloomberg The Opening Trade	Guy Johnson, Anna Edwards and Kiri Gupita (London)	25 November 2024; 23 months ago (operational); 25 November 2024; 23 months ago (official)

=== Bloomberg Television (from Bloomberg Tower, Manhattan, New York City) ===
New York	London	Hong Kong/ Singapore	Tokyo/ Seoul	Sydney	Program	Anchor	First aired
3:00am-5:59am	8:00am-10:59am	4:00pm-6:59pm	5:00pm-7:59pm	6:00pm-8:59pm	Bloomberg Brief	Dani Burger (New York)	24 September 2013; 13 years ago
6:00am-8:59am	11:00am-12:59pm	7:00pm-8:59pm	8:00pm-9:59pm	9:00pm-10:59pm	Bloomberg Surveillance	Jonathan Ferro, Lisa Abramowicz and Annmarie Hordern	26 May 2020; 6 years ago
9:00am-10:59am	2:00pm-3:59pm	10:00pm-11:59pm	11:00pm-12:59am	Midnight-1:59am	Bloomberg: Open Interest	Matt Miller, Katie Greifeld and Sonalie Basak	8 July 2024; 2 years ago
11:00am-12:59pm	4:00pm-5:59pm	Midnight-1:59am	2:00am-2:59am	3:00am-3:59am	Bloomberg Markets	Matt Miller and Amanda Lang (Toronto with BNN Bloomberg)	11 May 2015; 11 years ago
1:00pm-1:59pm	6:00pm-6:59pm	2:00am-2:59am	3:00am-3:59am	4:00am-4:59am	Bloomberg: Balance of Power	Joe Mathieu and Kailey Leinz	11 September 2017; 9 years ago
2:00pm-2:59pm	7:00pm-7:59pm	3:00am-3:59am	4:00am-4:59am	5:00am-5:59am	Bloomberg Businessweek Daily	Carol Massar and Tim Stenovec	11 October 2018; 8 years ago
3:00pm-4:59pm	8:00am-9:59pm	4:00am-5:59am	5:00am-6:59am	6:00am-7:59am	Bloomberg:The Close	Romaine Bostick, Alix Steel and Scarlet Fu	11 October 2018; 8 years ago
5:00pm-5:59pm	10:00pm-10:59pm	6:00am-6:59am	7:00am-7:59am	8:00am-8:59am	Bloomberg: Balance of Power	Joe Mathieu and Kailey Leinz	11 September 2017; 9 years ago

Weekly shows

- Bloomberg This Weekend
- Bloomberg Wall Street Week (from Wall Street, Manhattan, New York City)
- Best of Bloomberg Technology with Emily Chang
- Bloomberg Best
- Bloomberg Businessweek with Carol Massar and Jason Kelly
- Bloomberg Commodities Edge with Alix Steel
- Brilliant Ideas
- Good Fortunes
- Bloomberg Real Yield with Jonathan Ferro
- Bloomberg ETF IQ with Scarlet Fu
- Studio 1.0 with Emily Chang
- High Flyers with Haslinda Amin
- Best of Bloomberg Markets Middle East with Yousef Gamal El-Din or Tracy Alloway
- Leaders with Lacqua with Francine Lacqua

== Controversy ==
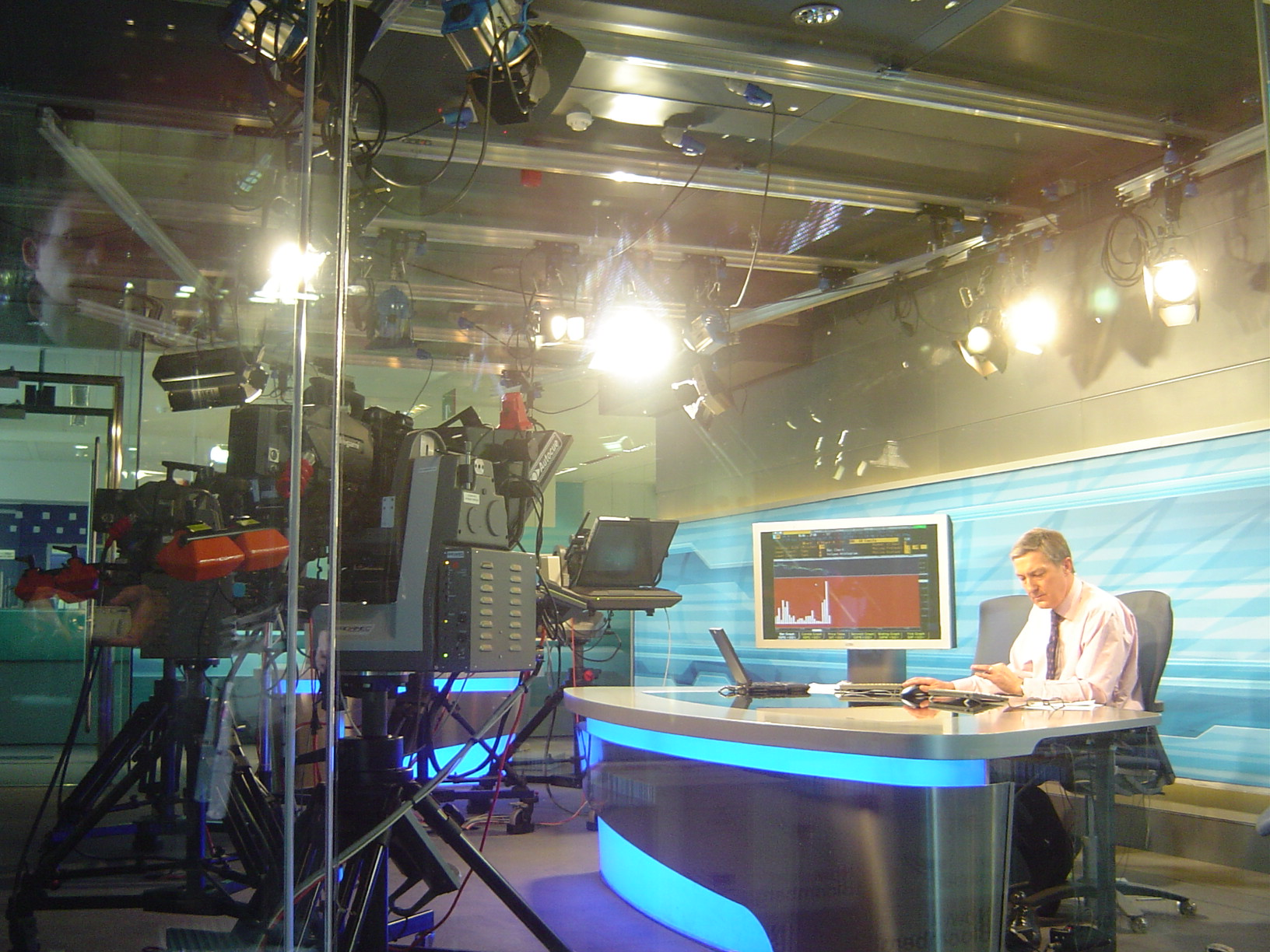
Bloomberg Europe studio

In the United Kingdom, Bloomberg Television was severely reprimanded for breach of Ofcom rules during the 2005 UK national (General) election. Bloomberg was found to have shown pro-Labour Party bias. This occurred because of a breach of British law. In the run up to a general election, television channels must provide equal time to all major political parties. Bloomberg covered the release by the Labour Party of their so-called "Business Manifesto", but did not provide counterbalancing air time to the Conservatives or Liberal Democrats.

== Datascreen and news ticker ==
Bloomberg was well known for using a datascreen format that occupied most of the television screen and the camera shots. Until 1998, Bloomberg did not have a moving ticker. Instead, it had boxes that were dedicated to world news, as well as weather conditions in selected cities, in addition to market data which was confined to the bottom of the screen. This changed gradually to focus more on business news. The data screen was reformatted several times to include a moving stock ticker and accommodate new graphics.

The datascreen format was phased out in late 2007, where the programs were seen almost in full-screen with the ticker and headlines bar confined to the lower part of the screen. However, Bloomberg HD (available in the US only) features more data boxes on the right side of the screen compared to its SD counterpart. This effectively makes on-screen presentation on Bloomberg HD resemble the pre-2007 datascreen.

On Monday September 22, 2014, Bloomberg Television dropped the long-standing live stock ticker as part of the new on screen information format. No reason for this was given.

== Other platforms ==
The widespread growth of mobile devices and social media have influenced sites such as Bloomberg to expand its news platforms into other areas. Bloomberg Television offers some off-air news updates via social media including Facebook, and Twitter. Rebroadcasts of news and other special programs are additionally aired on the station's official YouTube channel "Bloomberg Television". On mobile devices, Bloomberg Television released an app available for the iPad. It is also available for free viewing on Pluto TV streaming service.

As of February 2019, the audio simulcast of Bloomberg TV is distributed on Entercom's Radio.com website and app.

== See also ==
- Bloomberg News
- WBBR
