= Embryonic differentiation waves =

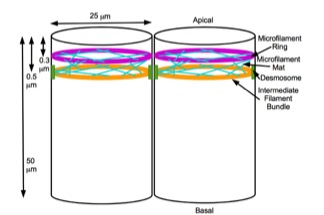
Schematic of cell state splitter organelle

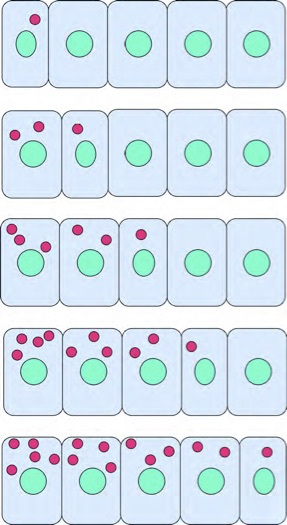
How embryonic differentiation waves create gradients

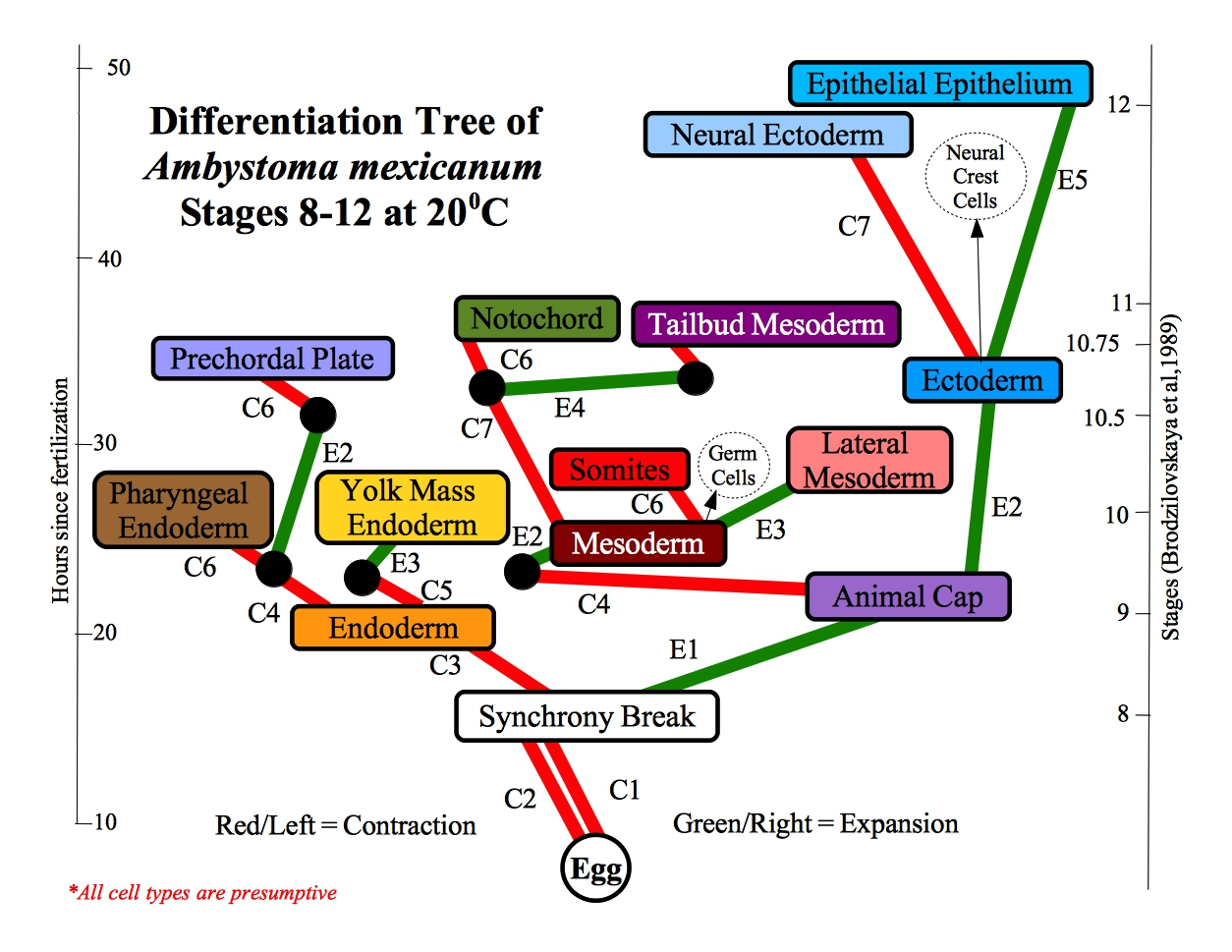
Differentiation tree of the Axolotl

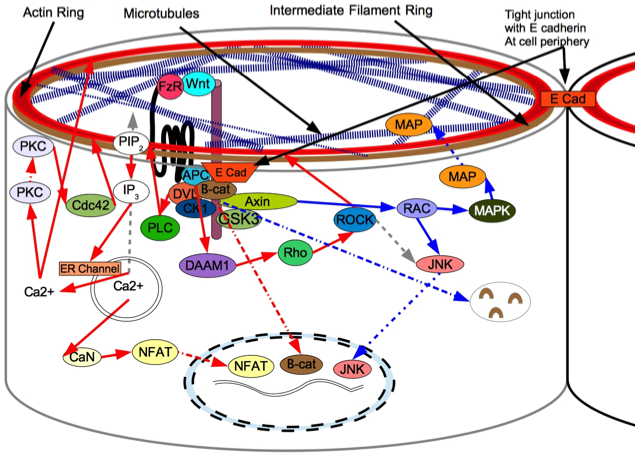
Signal transduction model for embryonic differentiation waves

A mechanochemical based model for primary neural induction was first proposed in 1985 by Brodland and Gordon. They proposed that there is a mechanically sensitive bistable organelle made of microtubules and microfilaments in the apical ends of cells within cell sheets that are about to differentiate (that are competent) and these cells are under mechanical tension. The microtubules and microfilaments are in mechanical opposition in a proposed embryonic organelle they called the cell state splitter. Depending on where the cell is within a sheet, the tension will be resolved by either the apical end contracting or the apical end expanding. The resolution will begin at one point and spread over the rest of the tissue limited by other mechanical forces at boundaries. An actual physical wave of contraction has been found which traverses the presumptive neural epithelium of the developing salamander, the axolotl (Ambystoma mexicanum). The contraction wave's trajectory was more complex than predicted in the original model however it did originate from the precise location of the Spemann organizer and traversed only the presumptive neural epithelium. Electron microscopy showed intermediate filaments are also present in the cell state splitter. Additional waves of both contraction and expansion were also discovered by time lapse photography of axolotl gastrulation. Among them was a wave of expansion that occurs in ectoderm only in the presumptive epithelium. When the trajectories of the waves were superimposed on the fate map of the axolotl it was shown that there is a unique combination of expansion and contraction waves that correlates with the tissue types determined during gastrulation and that this set of wave trajectories could explain the shape of the fate map.

A biochemical basis for the signal transduction from the cytoskeleton to the nucleus resulting in changes in gene expression was first proposed by Björklund (now Gordon) and Gordon in 1993 This would result in a biochemical transduction of the biomechanical signal from the cytoskeleton that is thereby passed on to the nucleus. This then signals the changes in gene expression. If the cell has experienced contraction, one signal is sent and if the cell has experienced expansion then another signal is sent. The signal from the cytoskeleton is what causes determination of cell fate. The phenomena of gene gradients during development is dismissed as an epiphenomena resulting from the passage of the biomechanical wave initiating changes in gene expression in individual cells as the wave passes through a cell sheet. They have outlined their research and their theory of differentiation waves in detail in their book Embryogenesis Explained. For example, the first differentiation that takes place during mammalian compaction is explained in terms of their differentiation waves model thus; Cells on the outside of the morula expand due to the effect of their position on the outside of the early ball of cells and they become determined to be trophoblast. Cells on the inside of the ball contract instead due to the mechanical force of being on the inside and they become determined to be the inner cell mass. All the other activity, such as changes in gene expression, signalling proteins, release of morphogens, and epigenetic changes, are considered the result of differentiation after the response of the cytoskeleton to mechanical signals which then determines cell fate using purely mechanical signals. Failure of neural tube closure is explained as a failure of methylation of cytoskeleton of developing neural tissue for those neural tube defects which are folate sensitive and prevented by folic acid supplementation.
