= Double-wristing =

Wearing two watches at once

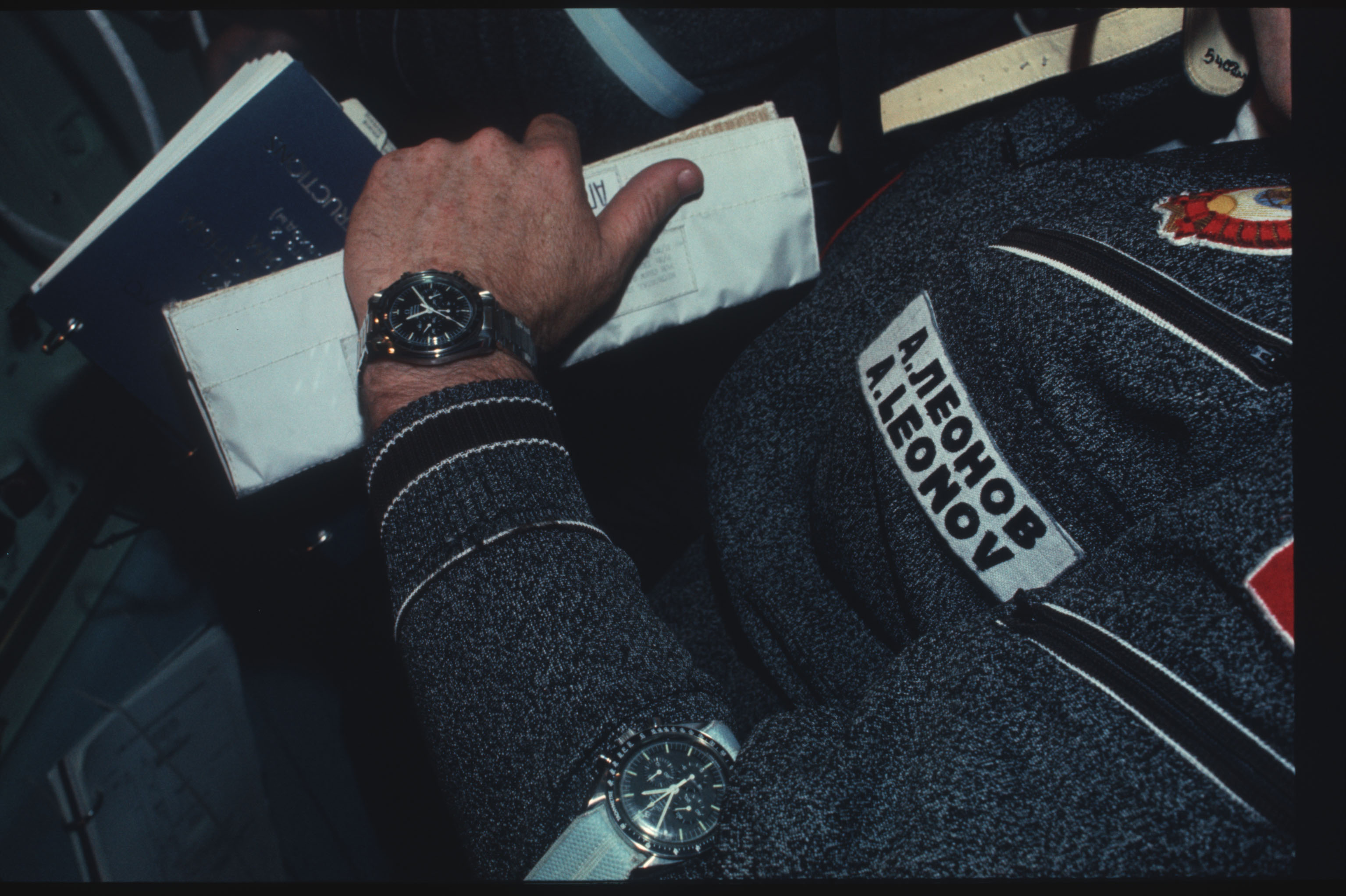
Alexei Leonov wearing two watches in the Apollo Soyuz Test Project

Double-wristing is the habit of wearing two watches at the same time. The watches may be worn on the same arm or one on each wrist. The practice may be done as a way to keep time in different time zones, as luxury display or for personal reasons. While often seen as eccentric, double-wristing is also done by non-public people for practical reasons.

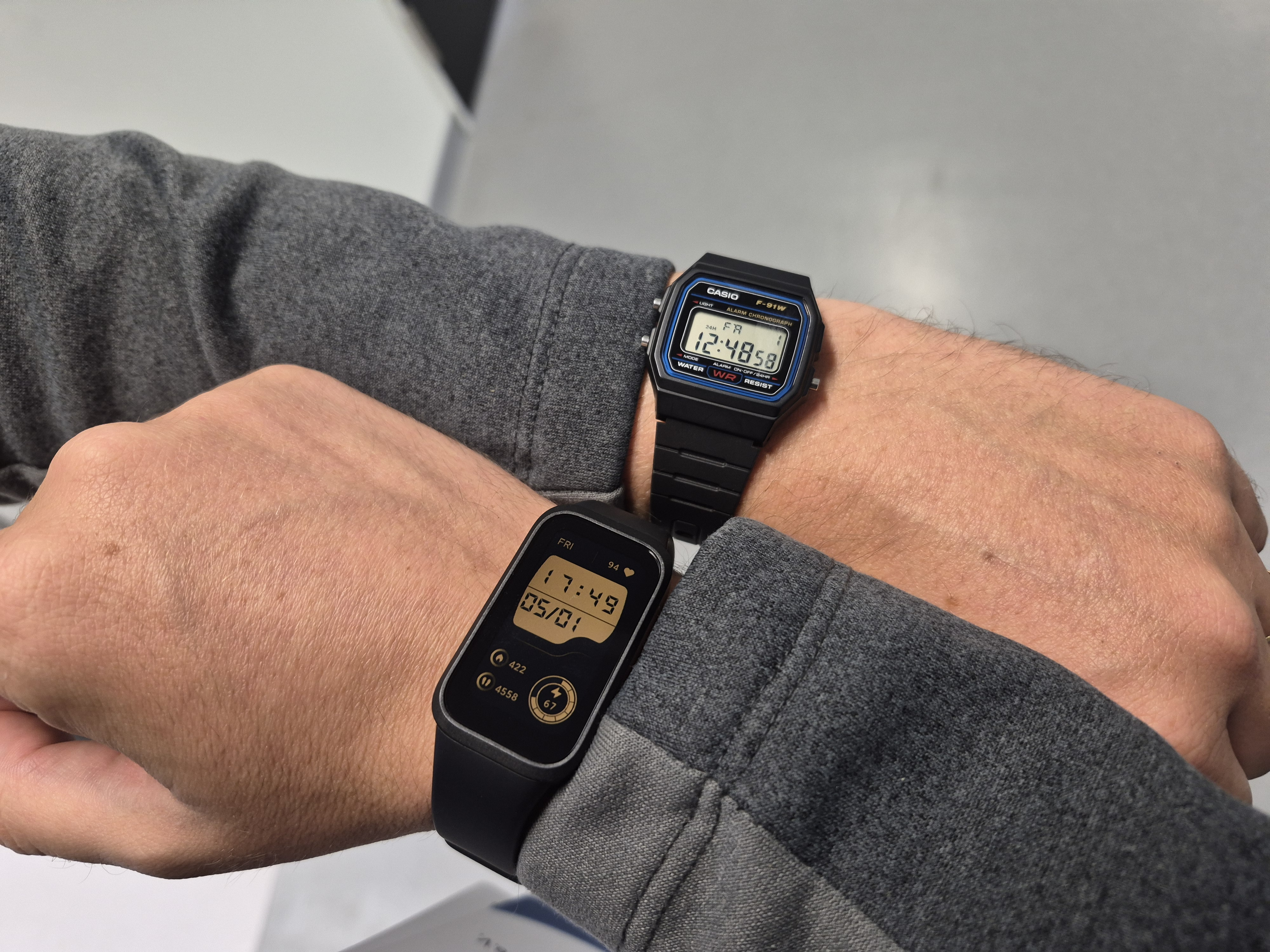
Practical double-wristing with a Casio F-91W and a Mi Band 9 in different time zones

In the decade of 2020, the habit was considered by some as a fashion trend.

== Notable people ==
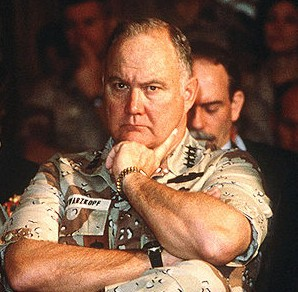
GEN Norman Schwarzkopf Jr. was a major example of a military figure who would wear two watches.

The list of people known for double-wristing habits ranges from military personnel to sports and television celebrities. Maradona was also known for his habits of using two watches, each reportedly engraved with the name of one of his two daughters with Claudia Villafane. Buzz Aldrin reportedly wore three watches at the same time.

The list also includes:

- Bill Murray
- Prince William
- Chris Pratt
- Drake
- Fidel Castro
- Johnny Depp
- Justin Bieber
- Kevin O'Leary
- LeBron James
- Marcus Rashford
- Marlon Brando
- Norman Schwarzkopf Jr.
- Offset
- Princess Diana
- Toto Wolff

== See also ==
- Segal's law
