= Project Earth (TV series) =

2008 television series

- Presented by: Kevin O'Leary, Jennifer L. Languell, Basil Singer and Mocean Melvin

Production
- Camera setup: Multi-camera

Project Earth is a 2008 reality TV series, hosted by Kevin O'Leary, Jennifer L. Languell, Basil Singer and Mocean Melvin, on the Discovery Channel in which several groups of scientists experiment with radical ideas to slow and/or stop global warming using geoengineering methods.

== Projects ==
The show consists of eight experiments to weigh pros and cons of ideas on how to reduce global warming. The projects are as follows:

=== Wrapping Greenland ===
Seeing if glacier melting on Greenland can be prevented by covering them with insulating sheets.

=== Raining Forests ===
Led by scientist Mark Hodges, they attempt to reforest areas of bare Earth from helicopters using canisters holding a tree seedling.

=== Brighter Earth ===
Led by atmospheric physicist John Latham and engineer Stephen Salter, the team attempted a Cloud reflectivity enhancement experiment. Their goal was to make clouds more reflective to bounce more of the Sun's heat generating rays back into space as a stop-gap against global warming. By changing the size of water droplets within a cloud, they make clouds brighter and reflect the Sun's heat into space. They choose to seed marine stratocumulus clouds because of their commonality around the world and the fact that they are low-lying, making it easier for man-made droplets to reach them. The Project Earth team uses the potassium chloride and sodium chloride from (salt-based) flares to form droplet particles that are one micrometre in diameter, and that can rise to 300 ft (91 m), even in adverse (cloudless) conditions. The experiment proves that man-made droplets can indeed seed stratocumulus clouds.

The team is also charged with creating a delivery system for the cloud creation mechanisms that allows for low carbon emission, remote controlled vessels. They employ the concept of the Flettner rotor by fabricating rotors and installing them onto a reinforced/retrofitted trimaran.

After a series of computer simulations based on current and rising CO_{2} levels, Basil determined that without the proposed fleet of ships, the average global temperature would rise 2.9 degrees Celsius by the end of the 21st Century; enough to melt glaciers that are important to the freshwater needs of Asia and Africa and the hydro-electric power needs of Europe. Using a fleet of 1500 cloud enhancing ships employing the recently discovered technologies would reduce that average global temperature change to only 1 degree Celsius by the end of the 21st century. The slower rise in temperature would grant humanity more time to reduce carbon emissions before a major climate related catastrophe was likely to strike.

The estimated cost of the fleet of remote-operated cloud enhancing vessels would was valued at $5.8 billion US, a fraction of the $44 trillion US world economy that would be irreparably damaged if climate change were to continue unchecked.

=== Infinite Winds ===
Testing of a revolutionary wind turbine led by Inventor and lead engineer Fred Ferguson (Magenn Power) in an attempt to harness the energy of high-altitude winds. The team will test a 70-foot (21 m) prototype attached to a blimp over The Appalachians to harness the endless supply of wind.

=== Hungry Oceans ===
Dr. Brian von Herzen and the Discovery team join Professors David Karl (University of Hawaii) and Ricardo M Letelier (Oregon State University) to test wave powered pumps in an effort to bring nutrients from the depths of the oceans to the surface. This nutrient enrichment of the open ocean's well-lit surface layers is needed to enhance photosynthesis and trigger large blooms of phytoplankton that could increase the role of vast oceanic regions in the sequestration of anthropogenic carbon dioxide. However, before producing large scale perturbations using these pumps, the scientific team from Hawaii and Oregon wants to better understand the risks and benefits of such large scale perturbations by looking at the effect that the deployment of a few pumps may have in the environment.

=== Space Sunshield ===
Attempting to create a 100,000-square-mile (260,000 km^{2}) sunshade by placing trillions of lenses in space, led by astronomer and professor Roger Angel. Angel has developed a diffraction pattern by etching onto a lens, which will deflect the Sun's rays.

=== Orbital Power Plant ===
Former NASA physicist John C. Mankins's vision of launching thousands of satellites into space, gathering solar energy from the Sun and beaming it down to Earth as microwave energy. The energy will then be collected by antennas on the ground, which will convert it into electricity.

=== Fixing Carbon ===
Testing to see if the air can be scrubbed clean of its carbon dioxide. David Keith builds a machine prototype that sucks air into one end and sprays with a sodium hydroxide solution, then expelling clean air out.

== See also ==
- Retreat of glaciers since 1850
