= Catherine Violet Hubbard Animal Sanctuary =

Memorial charity based in Newtown, Connecticut, US

- Named after: Catherine Hubbard
- Formation: 2013; 13 years ago
- Founders: Jenny and Matt Hubbard
- Location: Newtown, Connecticut
- Executive Director and President: Jenny Hubbard
- Website: cvhfoundation.org

The Catherine Violet Hubbard Animal Sanctuary was created in 2013 in honor of Catherine Violet Hubbard, a six-year-old killed at Sandy Hook Elementary School on December 14, 2012. Started by Catherine's parents, Jenny and Matt Hubbard, the goal of the sanctuary is to provide "a place of compassion and acceptance where all creatures will know they are safe and people are kind, just as Catherine would have wanted." Jenny Hubbard is the executive director of the Sanctuary and President of the Catherine Violet Hubbard Foundation.

The sanctuary includes 34 acres of meadows and woodlands in Newtown, Connecticut. The sanctuary does not have a building at this time, though the property is open to the public from dawn to dusk.

== Mission ==
The Catherine Violet Hubbard Animal Sanctuary (CVHAS) is a non-profit organization that provides animal rescue support, educational programming on wildlife conservation, and community workshops focused on the human-animal bond.

== Programs ==
Whether focused on bugs, birds, pets, farm animals, nature or the ecosystem, Sanctuary programs provide learning opportunities that promote the care and nurture of creatures and the world where they live.
