= Peter Armstrong (journalist) =

Canadian radio/television journalist

- Born: Oakville, Ontario, Canada
- Education: Acadia University; Université Laval
- Spouse: Piya Chattopadhyay
- Parent: Sally Armstrong (mother)
- Presenting career
- Show: On the Money
- Network: CBC News Network

Peter Armstrong is a Canadian radio and television journalist, working with the Canadian Broadcasting Corporation. He is currently the economics reporter for CBC News, and was the host of the business news series On the Money (cancelled June 28, 2018) on CBC News Network.

Originally from Oakville, Ontario, Canada, he is the son of journalist Sally Armstrong. He graduated from Acadia University and Université Laval before he began working for CBC Radio in Quebec City. He later moved to Saint John, Toronto, Ottawa and Vancouver before moving to the Middle East in 2006 as the CBC's bureau chief in Jerusalem. In 2009, he returned to Canada as anchor of CBC Radio One's morning newscast World Report.

He has also been a reporter in the network's sports division.

Armstrong has received several awards including the RTNDA for Best Newscast in 2012 and the Golden Nymph for best TV news item at the Monte Carlo TV Festival in 2008.

He is married to fellow journalist Piya Chattopadhyay, whom he met while both were working for the CBC.
