= Sally Armstrong (journalist) =

Canadian journalist, documentary filmmaker and human rights activist

Sally Armstrong OC
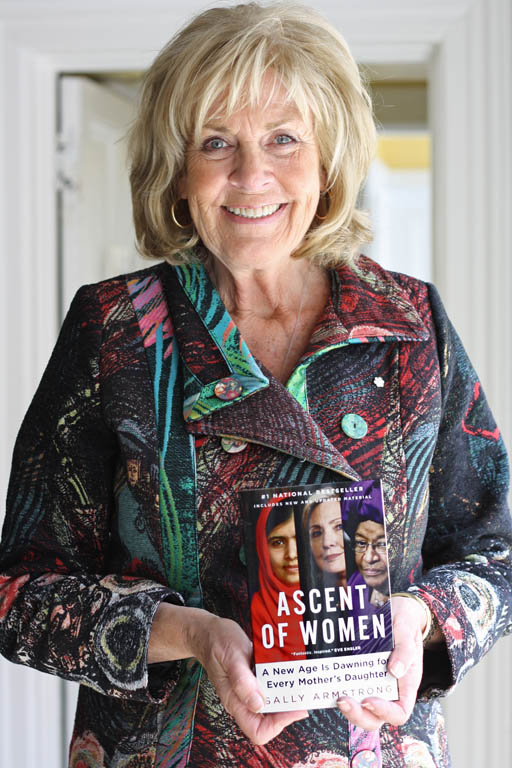
- Born: 1943 (age 82–83); Montreal, Quebec, Canada
- Other name: Sally Wishart Armstrong
- Occupations: journalist, documentary filmmaker, and human rights activist
- Awards: Officer of the Order of Canada

Sally Wishart Armstrong OC (born 1943) is a Canadian journalist, documentary filmmaker, and human rights activist.

== Career ==
Armstrong was born in Montreal, Quebec. She received a Bachelor of Education degree from McGill University in 1966 and a Master of Science degree from the University of Toronto in 2001. From 1975 to 1988, she worked for Canadian Living magazine. From 1988 to 1999 she was editor-in-chief of Homemakers magazine. She was a contributing editor of Maclean's from 2001 to 2010. In 2002, she was UNICEF's Special Representative to Afghanistan. She is the author of Mila (1992), Veiled Threat: The Hidden Power of the Women of Afghanistan (2002), The Nine Lives of Charlotte Taylor (2007), Bitter Roots, Tender Shoots: The Uncertain Fate of Afghanistan's Women (2008), Ascent of Women: A New Age Is Dawning for Every Mother's Daughter (2013), and Power Shift: The Longest Revolution (2019). In 2001, she was the scriptwriter for the documentary Falling from the Sky and Daughters of Afghanistan in 2003.

== Honours ==
In 1998, she was made a Member of the Order of Canada. In 2002, she was awarded an honorary doctorate degree from McGill University. In 2015, she was awarded an honorary Doctor of Laws from Carleton University. In 2000, she won the Amnesty International Media Award for her article "Honour's Victims" in Chatelaine magazine. She won again in 2002, for her article "Speaking their peace" in Chatelaine magazine and again in 2011 for her article "These Little Girls are Setting out to Change the World" in Chatelaine. She provided critical support to Richard Gordon with the founding of the charity Books With Wings. Sally Armstrong is a member of a UN group consisting of 20 Palestinian women, 20 Israeli women and 12 women of other nationality working to help bringing peace to the Middle East. In 1996 she was awarded Women of Distinction Award in Communications by the YWCA of Toronto.

She was the invited speaker for the 2019 CBC Massey Lectures, a series entitled "Power Shift: The Longest Revolution", in which she said that "improving the status of women was crucial to our collective surviving – and thriving."

== Personal ==
She is the mother of CBC News journalist Peter Armstrong.
