= Rudyard Griffiths =

Canadian author, broadcaster, and philanthropic adviser

- Born: 1970 (age 55–56)
- Education: University of Toronto; Emmanuel College, Cambridge
- Occupations: Author; television broadcaster; philanthropic adviser; columnist

Rudyard Griffiths (born 1970) is a Canadian author, television broadcaster, and philanthropic adviser. He has been a columnist at the National Post, Toronto Star and The Hub and a television anchor on CTV News Channel and the Business News Network. He is a senior fellow at the Munk School of Global Affairs and Public Policy where he chairs the Ontario 360 research initiative.

== Education ==
Griffiths was educated at the University of Cambridge, Trinity College, and the University of Toronto, where he studied political theory.

== Munk Debates ==
Rudyard Griffiths is the organizer and moderator of the Munk Debates. The semi-annual debates are a signature initiative of the Aurea Foundation and its founder industrialist Peter Munk. In 2015, Rudyard Griffiths moderated the first-ever Canadian election debate dedicated to foreign policy.

Rudyard Griffiths was the co-founder of the Dominion Institute; a national charity created in 1997 to promote history and civics education in Canadian high schools. He stepped down as executive director in July 2008. Following the 2009 merger of the Dominion Institute and the Historica Foundation to create Historica Canada, he was a board member of the combined organization until 2012. He is a founding director and member of the executive committee of the board of the Global Centre for Pluralism; an international initiative of the Aga Khan IV and the Government of Canada.

In 2006, Rudyard Griffiths was recognised by The Globe and Mail as one of Canada's top 40 under 40. He has edited various collections of essays on international, political, and historical themes and is the author of the bestselling book Who We Are: A Citizen's Manifesto (2009).

== Bibliography ==
- Editor, Great Questions of Canada, Stoddart, 2000
- Contributor, Passages to Canada, Doubleday, 2001
- Contributor, Story of a Nation, Doubleday, 2002
- Editor, Lafontaine-Baldwin Lectures, Vol. I, Penguin, 2002
- Contributor, Our Story, Doubleday, 2004
- Co-author, Rare Courage, McClelland & Stewart, 2005
- Editor, Lafontaine-Baldwin Lectures, Vol II, Penguin, 2006
- Editor, Great Questions of Canada, 2nd Edition, Key Porter Books, 2007
- Co-Editor, American Power: Potential and Limits in the 21st Century, Key Porter Books, 2007
- Co-Editor, The Race to the White House, Key Porter Books, 2008
- Editor, American Myths: What Canadians Think They Know About the U.S., Key Porter Books, 2008
- Editor, Canada 2020: Twenty Leading Voices Imagine Canada's Future, Key Porter Books, 2008
- Editor, 101 Things Canadians Should Know About Canada, Key Porter Books, 2008
- Author, Who We Are: A Citizen's Manifesto, Douglas & McIntyre, 2009
- Editor, The Munk Debates: Volume I, Anansi Books, 2010
- Editor, Hitchens vs. Blair: The Munk Debate on Religion, Anansi Books, 2011
- Co-Editor, The Munk Debate on China, Anansi Books, 2011
- Co-Editor, The Munk Debate on The North American Economy, Anansi Books, 2012
- Editor, The Munk Debate on Europe, Anansi Books, 2012
- Editor, The Munk Debate on Iran, Anansi Books, 2013
- Editor, The Munk Debate on Taxing the Wealthy, Anansi Books, 2013
- Editor, The Munk Debate on Gender in the 21st Century, Anansi Books, 2013
- Editor, The Munk Debate on State Surveillance, Anansi Books, 2014
- Editor, The Munk Debate on Obama's Foreign Policy, Anansi Books, 2015
- Editor, The Munk Debate on Putin's Russia, Anansi Books, 2015
- Editor, The Munk Debate on Progress, Anansi Books, 2016
