= On the Money (Canadian TV program) =

Economic news program

- Presented by: Peter Armstrong
- Country of origin: Canada
- Original language: English

Original release
- Network: CBC News Network
- Release: September 12, 2016 – June 28, 2018

On the Money is a business and economics news program which aired on CBC News Network from September 12, 2016 to June 28, 2018. The program was developed as a replacement for the network's previous business news program, The Exchange. It was hosted by Peter Armstrong and aired weekdays at 4pm ET/ 1pm PT.

The program was cancelled on June 20, 2018 due to budget constraints at the CBC.
