= Pana Merchant =

Canadian politician

The Honourable Pana Merchant

Canadian Senator from Saskatchewan
- In office December 12, 2002 – March 31, 2017
- Nominated by: Jean Chrétien
- Appointed by: Adrienne Clarkson

Personal details
- Born: Pana Papas Merchant; April 2, 1943 (age 83) Greece
- Party: Senate Liberal Caucus
- Other political affiliations: Liberal (until 2014)
- Spouse: Anthony Merchant
- Children: 3
- Education: University of Saskatchewan; University of Regina

Pana Pappas Merchant (born April 2, 1943) was a Liberal Senator from the Canadian province of Saskatchewan. She held the position since her appointment to the Senate by Prime Minister Jean Chrétien in 2002 until her retirement in 2017.

== Background ==
On January 29, 2014, Liberal Party leader Justin Trudeau announced all Liberal Senators, including Merchant, were removed from the Liberal caucus, and would continue sitting as Independents. The Senators refer to themselves as the Senate Liberal Caucus even though they are no longer members of the parliamentary Liberal caucus.

Pana Merchant was a longtime member of the Board of Directors of The Parliamentary Network, a founding and long term member of the Canadian Race Relations Foundation, and a longtime member of the World Hellenic Inter-Parliamentary Association.

Senator Pana announced her resignation from the Senate on March 31, 2017, approximately a year ahead of her mandatory retirement date.
