= BNN Bloomberg =

Canadian specialty TV channel

- Country: Canada
- Broadcast area: Nationwide
- Headquarters: 299 Queen Street West, Toronto, Ontario, Canada

Programming
- Language: English
- Picture format: 1080i HDTV (downscaled to letterboxed to 480i for the SDTV feed)

Ownership
- Owner: Bell Media (branding licensed from Bloomberg L.P.)
- Sister channels: CTV News Channel; CP24

History
- Launched: September 1, 1999; 27 years ago
- Former names: Report on Business Television (1999–2007); Business News Network (2007–2018)

Links
- Website: bnnbloomberg.ca

BNN Bloomberg is a Canadian English-language discretionary specialty channel owned by Bell Media with the name licensed from Bloomberg L.P. It broadcasts programming related to business and financial news and analysis. The channel is headquartered at 299 Queen Street West in Downtown Toronto.

BNN was established on September 1, 1999, as Report on Business Television (RoBTV) under a joint venture of Thomson Corporation, the owners of The Globe and Mail newspaper, Western International Communications, and Cancom. Canwest, the owners of Global Television Network, acquired WIC in 2000, while Thomson transferred the shares of its channel to Bell Globemedia, where it has been solely owned since 2001. The channel was rebranded to Business News Network in 2007, which allowed The Globe and Mail to regain exclusive rights to the Report on Business brand. After Thomson Corporation reacquired the Globe paper and Bell Canada regained control of CTVglobemedia (the former Bell Globemedia) in 2011, where it became Bell Media, the channel was relaunched on April 30, 2018, under its current name, under a partnership with U.S. business channel Bloomberg Television.

In addition to BNN producing a large portion of its business day programming in-house, much of the channel's programming was also simulcasted on radio, branded as BNN Bloomberg Radio, formerly by CKOC in Hamilton and CFTE in Vancouver.

As a former Category A service, BNN Bloomberg was required to be carried on the basic service of all digital cable providers across Canada. The channel was, and still is, typically offered optionally at the discretion of providers.

== History ==
=== As Report on Business Television (RoBTV) ===
Logo as Report on Business Television used from used from 1999 to 2002

Logo as Report on Business Television used from 2002 to 2007

The network was licensed by the Canadian Radio-television and Telecommunications Commission (CRTC) in 1996 to a joint venture of Thomson Corporation (50%), Western International Communications (25%), and Cancom (25%). It launched on September 1, 1999, as Report on Business Television (although using the abbreviation ROBTv); it was co-branded with Report on Business, the business news section of the Thomson-owned The Globe and Mail.

In 2000, Canwest acquired WIC and its interest in ROBTv. As part of the agreement transferring WIC's interests in Cancom to Shaw Communications, Canwest acquired Cancom's share of the channel as well.

The same year, the owners came into conflict with each other: Canwest acquired the Southam newspaper chain, including the National Post, the Globe's chief rival, while Thomson transferred the Globe and its shares of ROBTv to Bell Globemedia, a newly formed media company that also included CTV, in which Thomson held a 20% interest.

Following threats of legal action from both sides, in 2001 CanWest agreed to sell its 50% interest to Bell Globemedia in exchange for carriage of a proposed competitor aligned with the Financial Post on Bell Expressvu.

Bell Globemedia assumed full control of ROBTv in late 2001; the channel was then rebranded as Report on Business Television, discontinuing use of the abbreviated "ROBTv" brand.

=== As Business News Network (BNN) ===
Logo as BNN used from 2007 to 2018

On March 12, 2007, the channel was renamed Business News Network. The name change occurred to give exclusive rights to the "Report on Business" name to The Globe and Mail and for the channel to have its own identity. It also alleviated a common problem with the ROBTv name: other media and viewers called it "Rob TV," rather than sounding out the ROB acronym as preferred by the network.

BNN relocated its operations from 720 King Street West to 299 Queen Street West on December 6, 2010, in the building that was previously occupied by CITY-TV's CityNews department and where CTV's Much and Toronto's 24-hour news service CP24 are based; all were formerly owned by CHUM Limited.

Thomson Corporation reacquired control of The Globe and Mail (and therefore Report on Business) in late 2010, and CTVglobemedia's broadcasting assets were sold to Bell Canada; as a result, the channel and the newspaper are no longer co-owned, although Bell retains a 15% interest in the paper. Following the merger with Bell Canada on April 1, 2011, Bell Canada renamed its new business unit from CTVglobemedia to Bell Media.

=== As BNN Bloomberg ===
On January 9, 2018, Bell Media announced that it had reached a licensing and content agreement with Bloomberg L.P., under which BNN would be co-branded as BNN Bloomberg—a rebranding that took effect April 30, 2018. The rebranded network collaborates with Bloomberg's existing news bureaus, which include five Canadian bureaus staffed by over 25 reporters. Bell Media Radio also holds rights to distribute Bloomberg Radio content in Canada;

Bloomberg had previously partnered with Channel Zero on Bloomberg TV Canada, which was the U.S. service supplanted with programs covering Canadian financial news; that channel shut down in October 2017. BNN's existing domestic programming was largely maintained upon the rebranding, although the network does carry Bloomberg's business day programs for Asia and Europe outside of the North American business day. In addition, the 1:00 p.m. ET hour of Bloomberg Markets: Americas became a co-production with BNN, with Amanda Lang co-hosting from Toronto. As a result of the partnership, U.S. Bloomberg Television was once again pulled from Canadian television providers, but the network, as well as BNN Bloomberg itself, can be streamed online by BNN subscribers on participating television providers.

On June 20, 2024, Bell Media announced that BNN Bloomberg (along with sister channel CP24) would move to Bell Media's 9 Channel Nine Court building in Scarborough in the third quarter of 2025.

On September 3, 2024, BNN Bloomberg celebrated its 25th anniversary with a highlight reel featuring memorable moments from the station's history. Former hosts Frances Horodelski, Marty Cej, Kim Parlee, Bruce Sellery, Pat Kiernan and Ali Velshi also returned to celebrate the milestone.

== Programming ==
A large majority of the programming carried on BNN is produced in-house. Previously, it had been the Canadian broadcast partner of CNNfn, an American business news channel that ceased operations in December 2004. BNN features a televised stock ticker with real-time data from the Toronto Stock Exchange, the New York Stock Exchange, NASDAQ, and many international financial exchanges. BNN Bloomberg is headquartered in Scarborough, Ontario.

BNN attracts approximately 300 regular viewers daily and has a strong viewership outside of the home (such as in gyms, restaurants, and offices), which is not reflected in its ratings. This is a situation also faced by networks with high out-of-home viewing patterns, such as CNBC. In March 2016, ratings data from Numeris showed BNN had an average weekly reach of more than 1 million viewers since December 2015.

=== Special programming ===
The network hosts a series of special presentations throughout the year, including specials for tax and Registered Retirement Savings Plan seasons. In the fall of 2006, Report on Business Television hosted its first "Live On Location" event in Toronto, during which a studio audience was featured during two of the network's most popular shows, Market Call with Jim O'Connell and SqueezePlay with Kim Parlee and Andrew Bell. This was the first time viewers had the opportunity to go live in person with the network during its regular broadcasts of Market Call.

In May 2008, the network relaunched BNN.ca, featuring its first online contest called "The BNN.ca $25,000 Challenge." The updated BNN.ca showcased a new video player allowing investors to search, sort, and personalize BNN video, and the new player increased availability of past BNN video by allowing viewers to access content for an unlimited period of time online. Other added features on the site included blogs, a "Market Monitor" feature, video clips on the homepage, an online stock ticker, features such as "Hot Stocks" and "Guest Picks," stock indices, and tracking of the latest and popular news stories on the site.

BNN's weekend programming consists mainly of repeats of some of the programs aired on BNN's weekday schedule, as well as other Bloomberg Television series.

== Radio ==
Concurrent with the April 30, 2018, rebranding of BNN, Bell also relaunched its Vancouver radio station CFTE (formerly a TSN Radio station) as BNN Bloomberg Radio. The station features audio simulcasts of BNN Bloomberg television programs, as well as other Bloomberg Radio programs. The station is aimed at a national audience for streaming via iHeartRadio. On February 9, 2021, Bell flipped CKOC in Hamilton to BNN Bloomberg Radio as well, after it dropped its own TSN Radio format. In 2023, CFTE in Vancouver was closed, and Hamilton's CKOC was sold, pending CRTC approval. The BNN Bloomberg Radio feed will continue to run until the sale of CKOC is completed. On June 26, 2024, the CRTC approved the sale of CKOC, and the BNN Bloomberg Radio feed officially ended on August 19, 2024.

== Notable on-air personalities ==
- Amber Kanwar (resigned)
- Paul Bagnell (retired)
- Andy Bell (retired)
- Amanda Lang

== Notable producers ==
- Ryan Miller
