= Media in Brandon, Manitoba =

This is a list of media in Brandon, Manitoba, Canada.

== Radio stations ==
Frequency	Call sign	Branding	Format	Owner	Notes
FM 91.5	CKLQ-FM	Q Country 91.5	Country	Pattison Media	
FM 92.7	CBWS-FM	CBC Music	public music	Canadian Broadcasting Corporation	rebroadcasts CBW-FM Winnipeg
FM 94.7	CKLF-FM	Star FM	Hot AC	Pattison Media	
FM 96.1	CKX-FM	Bounce 96.1	Adult hits	Bell Media	
FM 97.9	CBWV-FM	CBC Radio One	news/information	Canadian Broadcasting Corporation	rebroadcasts CBW Winnipeg
FM 99.5	CKSB-8-FM	Ici Radio-Canada Première	French news/information	Canadian Broadcasting Corporation	rebroadcasts CKSB Winnipeg
FM 101.1	CKXA-FM	Pure Country 101	Country	Bell Media	Also broadcasts TSN 1290 feed of Winnipeg Jets games
FM 106.5	CJJJ-FM	CJ106	campus radio	Assiniboine Community College	

Brandon University has a closed-circuit campus radio station, which uses the informal call sign "CQBU", but this station does not currently broadcast on terrestrial radio.

Interlake Broadcast Group has an Internet-only radio station based in Brandon, playing an Adult Contemporary format. The station broadcasts 24/7 at channel1radio.com.

Maestro Music also has an internet-only radio station featuring independent artists broadcasting 24/7 at gomaestro.ca

== Television ==
All local aerial television in Brandon are analogue rebroadcasters of stations from Winnipeg. The first DTV channel is expected to be CKND-DT-2 in October, 2013:

OTA Analogue Channel	PSIP (OTA Digital Channel)	Westman Cable channel	Call sign	Network	Notes
2	2.1 (9)	9	CKND-TV-2	Global	Transmitter located near Minnedosa. CKND-DT-2 expected to begin transmission in October, 2013.
		6	CBWT-DT	CBC	No longer available over-the-air.
4		7	CKYB-TV	CTV	Transmitter located near Brandon.
		13	CBWFT-10	Radio-Canada	No longer available over-the-air.

Cable television in Brandon is served by Westman Cable, which operates a local community channel, WCGtv, on cable channel 12.

Until 2009, Brandon had only one locally based terrestrial television station, CKX-TV, which originated programming locally. The station was primarily a CBC Television affiliate, but also aired some programming from the A-Channel system owned by CTVglobemedia. CKX-TV closed down on October 2, 2009, after a deal to sell the station to an investor fell through. CBC service in Brandon is still available on Westman Cable channel 6, which was taken over by CBWT, after the closure of CKX-TV.

Maestro Music has programming through television streaming platforms like Roku and Firestick on Maestro TV. Its primary focus is independent artists through music videos and interviews as well as some local programming.

== Print ==
Brandon has three regular local newspapers. The Brandon Sun is a daily paper, News in a Minute is a daily coffee shop paper and the Westman Journal is a weekly paper. The Sun also produces two "community" editions that are distributed throughout Westman on Thursdays.

Students at Brandon University are served by the student newspaper The Quill, while Assiniboine Community College students are served by the monthly Student Focus newsletter.

The nominal Winnipeg edition of The Globe and Mail was at one time printed in Brandon.
