= CBC Winnipeg =

CBC Winnipeg refers to:

- CBW and CBW-1-FM, CBC Radio One on 990 AM and 89.3 FM
- CBW-FM, CBC Radio 2 on 98.3 FM
- CBWT-DT, CBC Television on channel 6

SRC Winnipeg refers to:

- CKSB and CKSB-10-FM, Première Chaîne on 1050 AM and 90.5 FM
- CKSB-FM, Espace Musique on 89.9 FM
- CBWFT-DT, Ici Radio-Canada Télé on channel 3
