= 24Hours (TV program) =

Canadian local television news program

24Hours is a one-hour news and current affairs program that was broadcast by CBWT, the CBC television station in Winnipeg, Manitoba, Canada.

== History ==
It began on October 5, 1970, (on the same day that James Cross was kidnapped by the FLQ in Quebec) and was first broadcast between 6:30 and 7:30 p.m.. The original on-air hosts were Garth Dawley (news), Murray Parker (weather), Don Wittman and Bob Picken (sports), John Harvard and Gerry Haslam (interviewer). On occasions, others contributed to the program, namely Heather Hildebrandt (CBC Winnipeg public affairs department) and freelancers Alice Poyser and Per Holting. Bill Morgan was the producer in the first year, and executive producer in the second.

Starting in the 1977–78 season, 24Hours was moved to a more standard time of 6:00-7:00 p.m., with John Robertson replacing John Harvard as host.

John Harvard, who was the program's first interviewer and held the post between 1970 and 1977. He returned the day after the November 1981 Provincial election, and remained until 1986. He interviewed the former interviewer from the 1977-1981 period, John Robertson.

In 1980, journalist Ricki Katz and producer Susan Millican won the Gordon Sinclair Award for broadcast journalism at the 9th ACTRA Awards, for the 24Hours documentary feature Incest: Scandal in the Family.

In September 1982, the chalkboard easel used for the 24Hours weather forecast, regularly provided by Murray Parker, was replaced with an electronic Telidon system. This was used for about two years when a regular CG system was put in place.

Also in 1982, CBWT was a pioneer within CBC television stations to use Betacam ENG cameras. Before this, reports were filed on 16 mm film.

In May 1984, Marv Terhoch was appointed director of CBWT of 24Hours.

Also between these years, Kevin Evans was the interviewer for 24Hours, until the local Videon cable system replaced KTHI Fargo with WDIV Detroit; the latter featured Mort Crim and his style of news and interviewing. To compete with that station, it hired the former ABC correspondent Mike McCourt who co-hosted the program between September 1986 and 1991.

John Bertrand, who was formerly the editor of the Winnipeg Sun, was hired as host of the new 5.30–6 p.m. segment, 24Hours Talkback, in November 1992. This program was broadcast until 1994 when it was canceled and Bertrand had moved on to CBC Radio One as on-air host of Questionnaire.

On October 2, 2000, as part of nationwide budget cuts and a shift of focus towards reporting of geopolitical events (war in Iraq and Afghanistan), 24Hours was replaced by a 30-minute program, Canada Now.

== News history after 24Hours ==
On November 10, 2006, CBWT announced that the CKY-TV news presenter Janet Stewart would become the 6 p.m. news presenter at the station.

On November 30, 2006, CBC announced that it would revert to the pre-2000 early evening news model from February 2007. Canada Now was cancelled, while local newscasts nationwide once again used an hour-long format.

CBWT announced on February 2, 2007, that the full hour of local news would return on Monday, February 19, 2007, and that Murray Parker would return as weather person. CBWT's newscast became known as CBC News: Winnipeg at Six. In September 2009, the station's news operations were expanded again with the launch of a 90-minute newscast from 5pm to 6:30pm and, a month later, a late night update following The National each weeknight.
