= CKX =

CKX may refer to:

- Chicken Airport's IATA code
- CKX-AM, callsign of former AM radio station in Brandon which became CKXA-FM
- CKX-FM in Brandon, Manitoba, Canada
- CKX-TV, former television station in Brandon, Manitoba, Canada
- Sony Pictures Television Nonfiction, American entertainment company previously known as CKX, Inc.
