= CKSB =

CKSB may refer to:

- CKSB-10-FM, a radio station (88.1 FM) licensed to St. Boniface, Manitoba, Canada
- CKSB-FM, a radio station (89.9 FM) licensed to Winnipeg, Manitoba, Canada
