= CBW =

CBW may refer to:

- CBW (AM), a radio station (990 AM) in Winnipeg, Manitoba, Canada
- CBW-FM, a radio station (98.3 FM) in Winnipeg, Manitoba, Canada
- Chemical and biological weapons/warfare – see:
  - Chemical warfare
  - Biological warfare
  - Weapons of mass destruction
- Cincinnati Bell Wireless
- Command Block Wrapper – see USB mass storage device class
- Canterbury West railway station
