= KX96 =

KX96 may refer to:

- CKX-FM, in Brandon, Manitoba
- CJKX-FM, in Ajax, Ontario
