= CBC Saskatchewan =

CBC Saskatchewan may refer to:

- CBC Regina (disambiguation)
- CBC Saskatoon (disambiguation)
