= Judy Waytiuk =

Canadian journalist

Judy Waytiuk is a Canadian freelance journalist based in Winnipeg, Manitoba.

She began her journalism career at the Winnipeg Free Press, as agriculture reporter, general reporter and business writer. After the Free Press, she joined CBC Television in Winnipeg as a morning television co-host, then spent two years in Toronto as co-host and producer for the short-lived national business program MoneyMakers. She returned to Winnipeg in 1978 to host the CBC regional current affairs weekly program Points West, and moved onto CBWT's 24Hours as reporter in 1979, then advanced to assignment editing and producing newscasts and documentaries. In 1987, she joined CKND to "assume responsibility for TV news and current affairs programming" as news director and executive producer, current affairs programming.

After leaving television news in 1994, she became a freelance journalist, writing for several magazines. She specialized in story/photo packages covering aspects of Canadian social geography, history, and culture. Since her move into freelancing, She has won the 2008 Travel Story of the Year Award and a 2003 Northern Lights Award from the Canadian Tourism Commission, the 2003 Tourism Industry Association of Canada Globe and Mail Travel Media Award, the 2002 Pluma de Plata (Silver Quill) award from the Mexico Tourism Board, a 2001 Travel Manitoba Tourism Media Award, and the 2001 Travel Media Association of Canada Best Canadian Destination Article Award.

She briefly returned to university to study creative writing and long form fiction writing. In 2018, she received the Alice Munro Literary Festival Best Short Story award, and in 2019, an unpublished novel was shortlisted as one of the ten best first, unpublished mystery novels in the Unhanged Arthur Award competition by the Crime Writers of Canada.

She splits her time between Canada and Mexico, and continues to write fiction.
