= Ricki Katz =

Canadian television journalist

- Occupations: Television journalist; reporter; documentarian
- Years active: 1976–1980s
- Employer: CBC
- Awards: Gordon Sinclair Award for Broadcast Journalism at the 9th ACTRA Awards (1980, shared with Susan Millican)

Ricki Katz is a Canadian former television journalist, who was a reporter and documentarian for 24Hours, the local news program on CBWT in Winnipeg, Manitoba, in the 1970s and 1980s.

She is historically most noted as host and co-creator of the 24Hours documentary special Incest: Scandal in the Family, for which she and producer Susan Millican won the Gordon Sinclair Award for broadcast journalism at the 9th ACTRA Awards in 1980.

She first joined the CBC in 1976 as a researcher for the program, before moving into an on-air role. She left the CBC in the 1980s to become public affairs manager for the Core Area Initiative, Winnipeg's urban renewal program to revitalize its downtown core.
