= Garth Dawley =

Canadian television journalist (1933–2020)

Garth Dawley (1933 - 2020) was most known for reading the news on CBWT's supper-hour news program 24Hours from October 5, 1970 – 1983.

Prior to his role at 24Hours he co-hosted the local morning show on CBW-AM in the 1960s.

At the age of 19, he became station announcer at Brandon's CKX-AM in 1952, and was one of the station's first reporters when it added a local news division in 1954. He also worked at Brandon's television station CKX-TV when it opened in 1955.

He also worked at Regina television station CKCK-TV.

He also taught journalism at summer workshops held at the University of Saskatchewan.

Garth got a spot on the Regina School Board and also served on the Regina Board of Education after amalgamation.

Garth began his broadcasting career at radio station CKX in Brandon, Manitoba, in 1952. Although his duties included general staff announcing, his main interest was in journalism. When CKX established a local news department he became one of its first on air voices. When TV came to Brandon he was assigned to present the daily supper hour news and though this assignment changed from time to time it remained his main focus. Moving to CKCK-TV Regina, Saskatchewan, in 1957, Garth again became involved with the reporting and presentation of daily news broadcasts.

Garth was elected to the Regina Public School Board and later when the Public School Board and the Collegiate Board amalgamated was elected to the new Regina Board of Education where he took an active role and led the contract negotiations that settled Canada's first ever school teachers strike.

In 1966 Garth joined CBC Winnipeg as a staff announcer later to become the TV News Commentator/Anchor for the daily major news programs. Denying he was a "news reader" he always believed his role was to "TELL" the stories of the day.

Always active in his community, Garth acted as emcee and guest speaker at numberless functions as well as taking part in his professional organizations such as CUPE and ACTRA where he served as President and Vice President respectively. He served two terms as President of the Regina Press Club and was Vice Chairman of Deer Lodge Centre.

In the federal election of 1988 Garth contested the riding of Winnipeg South Centre for the now defunct Progressive Conservative Party of Canada. When he failed to win election he returned to the CBC until appointed by the Mulroney government to the Canadian Radio-television and Telecommunications Commission as the first Regional Commissioner for Manitoba and Saskatchewan, a position he held for five years till 1998 when he retired.

Garth died from ALS on June 1, 2020. His wife May died July 28, 2022. They are survived by their three children, 5 grandchildren and one great grandchild.
