= Robin Spry =

Canadian film director (1939–2005)

- Born: October 25, 1939; Toronto, Ontario, Canada
- Died: March 28, 2005 (aged 65); Montreal, Quebec, Canada
- Education: Oxford University; London School of Economics
- Occupations: Film director Film producer Screenwriter
- Years active: 1965 - 2005

Robin Spry (October 25, 1939 – March 28, 2005) was a Canadian film director, producer and writer. He was perhaps best known for his documentary films Action: The October Crisis of 1970 and Reaction: A Portrait of a Society in Crisis about Quebec's October Crisis. His 1969 film Prologue won the BAFTA Award for Best Documentary.

== Biography ==
Robin Spry was born in Toronto, Ontario to Canadian broadcast pioneer and Canadian Broadcasting Corporation founder Graham Spry CC, and economic historian Irene Spry OC.

After studies at Oxford University and the London School of Economics, Spry began his filmmaking career in 1964 at the National Film Board in Montreal, earning a place on its payroll in 1965. He built a reputation as a documentarian engaged with the issues of the day, with films on abortion, youth rebellion, and contemporary politics. His 1969 film Prologue documented the riots at the 1968 Democratic National Convention in Chicago, weaving narrative with archival footage. His Canadian Film Award-winning documentary Action: The October Crisis of 1970 (1973) used a similar approach to tell the story of the kidnapping of British diplomat James Richard Cross and the murder of Pierre Laporte. While at the NFB, Spry acted as a producer, director, writer, cinematographer, film editor and actor, appearing in several colleagues' films, including Denys Arcand's Québec, Duplessis et après" (1972), in which he read sections of the 1839 Durham Report. He also starred in the 1981 hostage film Kings and Desperate Men.

In 1978, Spry left the NFB. He did some work for the CBC, then founded his own production company, Telescene Film Group Productions, through which he produced many TV movies and series. Upon its bankruptcy in 2000, he worked with the Montreal production company CinéGroupe.

The first season of his last production, Charlie Jade, was dedicated to his memory, as mentioned in the credits of the final episode, as was Air Crash Investigation's episode "Mistaken Identity".

== Personal life and death ==
Spry was divorced from journalist Carmel Dumas; they had two children. He died in a car crash in Montreal on March 28, 2005.

== Filmography ==
- You Don't Back Down - documentary short, Don Owen, National Film Board of Canada 1965 - writer
- Miner - documentary short, National Film Board of Canada 1965 - writer and director
- Level 4350 - documentary short, National Film Board of Canada 1965 - writer and director
- Little White Crimes - documentary short, George Kaczender, National Film Board of Canada 1966 - writer
- Illegal Abortion - documentary short, National Film Board of Canada 1966 - writer and director
- Change in the Maritimes - documentary short, National Film Board of Canada 1966 - writer and director
- Ride for Your Life - documentary short, National Film Board of Canada 1966 - director
- Flowers on a One-Way Street - documentary, National Film Board of Canada 1967 - writer and director
- Prologue - documentary, National Film Board of Canada 1967 - producer and director
- Downhill - short film, National Film Board of Canada 1973 - writer, producer and director
- Reaction: A Portrait of a Society in Crisis - documentary, National Film Board of Canada 1973 - producer and director
- Action: The October Crisis of 1970 - documentary, National Film Board of Canada 1974, writer, producer and director
- Face - short film, National Film Board of Canada 1975 - editor, cinematographer, producer and director
- One Man - feature, National Film Board of Canada 1977 - writer and director
- Drying Up the Streets - TV movie, CBC 1978 - director
- Don’t Forget - TV movie, For the Record), CBC 1979 - director
- Suzanne - feature, RSL Films 1980 - writer and director
- Winnie - short film 1981 - director
- To Serve the Coming Age - documentary 1983 - director
- You've Come a Long Way, Ladies - TV movie, Roger Cardinal 1984 - producer
- Stress and Emotion - documentary, for The Brain, WNET/PBS 1984
- Keeping Track - feature, Telescene Film Group Productions 1986 - writer, producer, director
- Malarek - feature, Telescene Film Group Productions, Roger Cardinal 1988 - producer
- Straight for the Heart - feature, Telescene Film Group Productions, Léa Pool 1988 - producer
- Obsessed (aka Hitting Home) - TV movie, Telescene Film Group Productions 1987 - writer and producer
- An Imaginary Tale - feature, Telescene Film Group Productions, André Forcier 1990 - producer
- Urban Angel - TV series, Telescene Film Group Productions, Canadian Broadcasting Corporation 1991-1992 - producer
- A Cry in the Night - TV movie, Telescene Film Group Productions et al - writer, producer and director
- The Myth of the Male Orgasm - feature, Telescene Film Group Productions et al, John Hamilton 1993 - producer
- Witchboard III: The Possession - feature, Telescene Film Group Productions, Peter Svatek 1995 - producer
- Hiroshima - docudrama, Cine Bazar & Telescene Film Group Productions, Koreyoshi Kurahara & Roger Spottiswoode 1995 - producer
- On Dangerous Ground - TV movie, Telescene Film Group Productions et al, Lawrence Gordon Clark 1996 - producer
- Windsor Protocol - TV movie, Telescene Film Group Productions & Vision View Productions, George Mihalka 1997 - producer
- Midnight Man - TV movie, Telescene Film Group Productions et al, Lawrence Gordon Clark 1997 - producer
- The Hunger - TV series, Telescene Film Group Productions, 1997-2000 - producer
- Student Bodies - TV series, Telescene Film Group Productions et al 1997-1999 - producer
- Mario, Mike and the Great Gretzky - Video, Telescene Film Group Productions, France Corbeil 1998 - producer
- Going to Kansas City - TV movie, Telescene Film Group Productions, Pekka Mandart 1998 - producer
- Escape from Wildcat Canyon - TV movie, Telescene Film Group Productions et al, Marc F. Voizard 1998 - producer
- Thunder Point - TV movie, Telescene Film Group Productions & Vision View Productions, George Mihalka 1998 - producer
- Nightmare Man - TV movie, Telescene Film Group Productions & Isambard Productions, Jim Kaufman 1999 - producer
- Big Wolf on Campus - TV series, Telescene Film Group Productions CinéGroupe & Saban Entertainment 1999-2002 - producer
- The Lost World - TV movie, Telescene Film Group Productions et al, Richard Franklin 1999 - producer
- The Lost World - TV series, Telescene Film Group Productions et al 1999-2001 - producer
- Live Through This - TV series, Telescene Film Group Productions et al, 2000-2001
- Dr. Jekyll and Mr. Hyde - TV movie, Telescene Film Group Productions, Colin Budds 2000 - producer
- The Lost World: Underground - Video, Telescene Film Group Productions, Colin Budds & Michael Offer 2002 - producer
- Matthew Blackheart: Monster Smasher - TV movie, Telescene Film Group Productions, Érik Canuel 2002 - producer
- Seriously Weird - TV series, CinéGroupe 2002-2005 - producer
- Student Seduction - TV movie, CinéGroupe et al 2003 - producer
- Charlie Jade - TV series, CinéGroupe 2004-2006 - producer

== Awards ==
Flowers on a One-way Street (1967)

- Melbourne Film Festival, Melbourne, Australia: Golden Boomerang, Special Prize for Reportage and Style, 1969
- American Film and Video Festival, New York: Blue Ribbon, 1969
- Chicago International Film Festival, Chicago: Gold Hugo for Best Television Film, Local Broadcast, 1968

Ride for Your Life (1967)

- International Short Film Festival Oberhausen, Oberhausen, Germany: Best in Category, 1968
- Melnik Automobile Club Festival, Prague: First Prize, 1969

Prologue (1969)

- 23rd British Academy Film Awards, London: BAFTA Award for Best Documentary, 1970
- Film Critics and Journalists Association of Ceylon, Colombo, Sri Lanka: First Prize

Action: The October Crisis of 1970 (1974)

- Visions du Réel, Nyon, Switzerland: Grand Prize for Best Documentary, Youth Jury 1975
- Chicago International Film Festival, Chicago: Silver Plaque, Feature Film, Documentary, 1975
- 26th Canadian Film Awards, Niagara-on-the-Lake, ON: Gemini Award for Best Direction, 1975

One Man (1977)

- International Festival of Red Cross and Health Films, Varna, Bulgaria: Best Direction, 1979
- ACTRA Awards, Montreal: Film of the Year, 1978
- ACTRA Awards, Montreal: Best Writing in the Visual Medium, 1978
- Film Festival Antwerpen, Antwerp: Second Best Film of the Festival, 1978
- Film Festival Antwerpen, Antwerp: Honorable Mention by the Press Jury, 1978
- 28th Canadian Film Awards, Toronto: Best Original Screenplay, 1977

Drying Up the Streets (1978)

- 9th ACTRA Awards, Toronto: Best Television Program of the Year, 1980

Obsessed (1987)

- Montreal World Film Festival, Montreal: Best Canadian Film, 1988

Straight for the Heart (1988)

- Festival International du Film Francophone de Namur, Namur, Belgium: Première Magazine First Prize, 1989
- FIN Atlantic Film Festival, Halifax, Nova Scotia: Award of Excellence, 1989

An Imaginary Tale (1990)

- Montreal World Film Festival, Montreal: Most Popular Film, 1990
- Cinéfest Sudbury International Film Festival, Greater Sudbury, ON: Best Canadian Film, 1990

Hiroshima (1995)

- 12th Gemini Awards, Toronto: Best Dramatic TV Movie or Mini-Series, 1998
- 48th Primetime Emmy Awards, Los Angeles: Nominee: Outstanding Miniseries, 1996
