= Murray Parker =

Murray Parker may refer to:

- Murray Parker (cricketer)
- Murray Parker (broadcaster)
