= Arvel Gray =

Canadian-born CBC Manitoba personality

Arvel Gray is a Canadian-born CBC Manitoba personality who anchored the local 30 minute television news program News at Noon until January 1985, when CBC's Midday program took its place.

== Biography ==
Gray has a sister, Avis Gray, who was a Liberal MLA in the 1980s.

Gray became 24Hours' weatherperson in the summer of 1977. Previous to this she worked briefly at KXJB-TV TV 4 Fargo as weather person while studying theatre and speech at Moorhead State University in 1976.

Arvel was news anchor for 24Hours LateNight in the 1980s as alternate to Anne Petrie.

She left CBWT in January 1995 to become a program jockey with then fledgling WTN, returning to CBC Manitoba after WTN was sold to Corus Entertainment in 2001.

Gray has written for Manitoba Gardener, Ontario Gardener and Alberta Gardener.

She was host of SCN's Math Works Tv for the 2003-04 television season.
