= Sarah Torgov =

Canadian actress

Sarah Torgov (born c. 1956) is a Canadian actress. She appeared in popular movies in the 1980s, including Meatballs, If You Could See What I Hear, American Gothic, The July Group, and Drying Up the Streets. Her television appearances included episodes of Simon & Simon and The Greatest American Hero.

She won an ACTRA Award for her performance in Drying Up the Streets at the 9th ACTRA Awards in 1980. It also earned her a nomination for a Canadian Film Award for Best Actress in a Non-Feature.

She stopped acting in 1988 and is now working as an artist and book illustrator in Los Angeles. She illustrated Let's Read Together: A Parent's Guide to Beginning Reading, by Ellen Gordon and Eileen Zweig.

== Personal life ==
She was born in Toronto. She is the daughter of noted Canadian humourist and novelist Morley Torgov and played the cello in high school. She is married to writer and television producer Douglas Steinberg.

== Filmography ==
=== Film ===
| Year | Title | Role | Notes |
|---|---|---|---|
| 1978 | Drying Up the Streets | Anne | |
| 1979 | Meatballs | Candace | |
| 1982 | If You Could See What I Hear | Patti Steffen | |
| 1988 | American Gothic | Cynthia | |

=== Television ===
| Year | Title | Role | Notes |
|---|---|---|---|
| 1979 | Matt and Jenny | Sarah | "A Call to Arms" |
| 1979 | The Littlest Hobo | Sarah | "Stand-in" |
| 1981 | Jack London's Tales of the Klondike | | "Scorn of Women" |
| 1981 | The July Group | Deborah | TV film |
| 1982 | The Greatest American Hero | Anna Kurienna | "It's All Downhill from Here" |
| 1982 | Simon & Simon | Rosalie Arthur | "Art for Arthur's Sake" |
| 1982 | The Circle Family | Betsy Circle | TV film |
| 1984 | Hangin' In | Lindsay | "Bridesmaid Revisited" |
