= Susan Millican =

Susan Millican, née Chipman, is a Canadian retired television and film industry executive.

== Career ==
She began her career as a news and documentary producer for 24Hours, the CBC Television local newscast in Winnipeg, Manitoba. In this role she and reporter Ricki Katz created the television documentary special Incest: Scandal in the Family, for which they won the Gordon Sinclair Award for broadcast journalism at the 9th ACTRA Awards in 1980. She was later also a producer, primarily of arts and entertainment features, for the national news program The Journal.

She was part of the team that launched Women's Television Network in the early 1990s, as the channel's vice-president of programming until the channel was sold to Corus Entertainment in 2001 and its operations were moved from Winnipeg to Toronto. She was then hired in a production role to develop Canadian and international programming for the similar American channel Oxygen, and later was chief executive officer of the National Screen Institute from 2002 to 2010.

Throughout her career she has also taught journalism classes at Winnipeg's Red River College, including launching a dedicated program for Indigenous Canadian journalists. She has also continued to be on community boards, including with The Winnipeg Foundation, Rossbrook House, and the Inspirit Foundation.

== Personal ==
She is the sister of Mark Chipman, the chairman of True North Sports & Entertainment. Their father, Bob Chipman, was a successful auto dealer in Winnipeg; their other siblings include Jeoff, who was CEO of the Winnipeg real estate holding company Stevenson Group, and Steve, who took over leadership of their father's car dealership business.

The Winnipeg Free Press published an article in 2014 that collectively highlighted all three brothers as community leaders without mentioning Millican at all, following which Katz wrote a letter to the editor noting Millican's achievements and community service work as being just as worthy of praise as her brothers.

Her husband, Jim Millican, was a music manager for The Guess Who, and a radio host and program director for CKMM-FM, during the same era as Susan's early career, and later also took on a senior role with True North.
