= Crossbar (film) =

Crossbar is a Canadian television film, which aired on CBC Television in 1979. A fictionalized account of the career of Canadian amputee athlete Arnie Boldt, the film starred Brent Carver as Aaron Kornylo, a former Olympic medalist struggling to return to athletics after losing his leg in a farming accident. Carver is not an amputee; Boldt himself was a stand-in for the film's athletic scenes and others where it was necessary for the character's amputation to be visible.

The film was not, however, a literal adaptation of Boldt's life; while it depicted Aaron Kornylo as a past Olympic athlete struggling to return to sport after an adult injury, in reality Boldt lost his leg in childhood and had only ever competed at the Paralympic Games.

The cast also included Kim Cattrall, Murray Westgate, Sara Botsford, Sean Sullivan, John Ireland and Kate Reid.

Carver was nominated for the Earle Grey Award for best actor in a television film at the 9th ACTRA Awards in 1980.
