= Inspirit Foundation =

Canadian foundation

- Founded: May 3, 2012
- Purpose: Media and Arts, Equity, Impact Investing, Youth, Systems Change, Social Change
- Location: Toronto, Ontario, Canada
- Region served: Canada
- Method: Grants
- Key people: Chair of Board of Directors Barbara Hall; CEO Sadia Zaman. Previous Board Chairs: Peter Lyman, Susan Millican, Dale Godsoe. Previous President & CEO: Andrea Nemtin
- Website: http://www.inspiritfoundation.org/

Inspirit Foundation is a Canadian, non-profit and granting organization, working to promote inclusion and pluralism through media and arts, support for young change leaders and impact investing – specifically addressing discrimination based on ethnicity, race or religion.

== History ==
The Inspirit Foundation grew out of the S-VOX Foundation after S-VOX sold its broadcasting assets to ZoomerMedia in 2010. S-VOX was a Canadian non-profit media organization that produced content on spirituality. It operated VisionTV and other related Canadian specialty channels from 1988 to 2010. At the time, Vision TV was the only multi-faith network. After the sale of VisionTV, S-VOX’s board of directors used the funds to create Inspirit Foundation.

== Activities ==
Inspirit's vision and mission is focused on building a pluralist Canada. The foundation does this by funding media and arts for social change, supporting the leadership of youth in the media and arts sectors, and investing capital in ways that align with their mission.

Inspirit's assets are invested in both public and private investments. The foundation relies on the financial returns earned through the investments to fund granting, programming and operations.

The foundation is committed to a 100% impact portfolio, with a goal of activating their full asset base to further the organizational vision.

Inspirit has charitable status and is governed by a Board of Directors, with a majority of members at arm's length from one another.

Some of the institutions supported by the Inspirit Foundation include the United Nations Association in Canada, the Canadian Red Cross, the Indian Residential Schools Truth and Reconciliation Commission, the John Humphrey Centre for Peace and Human Rights, Hot Docs, imagineNATIVE Film + Media Arts Festival, Apathy is Boring, and the Atwater Library in Quebec.

On the 4th anniversary of the Quebec Mosque Shooting, Inspirit Foundation along with Noor Culture Center funded a video series called "Islamophobia is...". The series deals with the topics of hate crimes against Muslims, gendered Islamophobia, the role of the mainstream media, and other issues related to Islamophobia in Canada.
