= Rosemary Thompson =

Canadian journalist

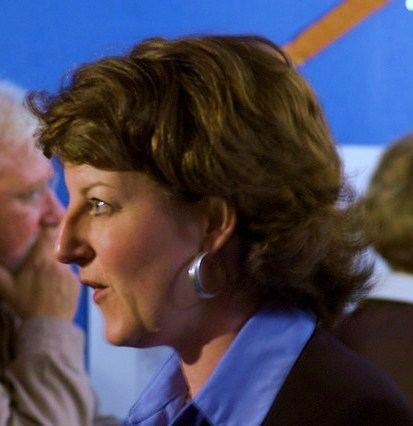
Rosemary Thompson in 2008

Rosemary Thompson is an entrepreneur and fluently bilingual arts and media executive. She serves as Senior Vice President, External of the Royal Canadian Geographical Society, which publishes Canadian Geographic, the country's #1 paid magazine online and in print with 4.4M readers each month. CanGeo Education has built a network of 28,000 educators that work with its free learning materials in the classroom. She is the co-founder of Artful Stratégies and has served in senior roles at the National Gallery of Canada, Banff Centre for Arts and Creativity, and Canada's National Arts Centre. She worked as deputy bureau chief of the parliamentary bureau for CTV News. She was a reporter and frequent guest host on CTV programs including Question Period and Mike Duffy Live. A veteran political correspondent, she covered 7 election campaigns in the United States, Quebec and Canada.

== Life and career ==
Thompson began her career as a summer intern at the MacNeil-Lehrer NewsHour on PBS in New York City in the 1980s. After graduating from Carleton University's School of Journalism in 1987 she was hired by the CBC in Winnipeg as an editorial assistant. She quickly climbed the reporting ranks at CBWT's 24 Hours program in the late 1980s. Thompson met her husband, Pierre Boulet, in Winnipeg. He worked as a reporter for Radio-Canada, the French language services of the CBC.

They married on 16 June 1990, just a week after the Meech Lake Accord was signed in Ottawa. But when that political accord began to unravel, Thompson wanted to move back to her home province of Quebec, to cover the political situation.

Thompson was hired by CBC Montreal's news program NewsWatch in 1991. Her mentors included the legendary assignment editor there, Bernard St-Laurent, and anchor Dennis Trudeau.

In 1995, just six months before a potential referendum, Thompson left the CBC for CTV, because she wanted a seat on the referendum campaign bus. Her life had been marked by Quebec politics and she wanted a front row seat to history. CTV News gave her that chance, when she was named "Montreal Bureau Chief" in March 1995.

Thompson's favourite political campaign was the 1995 referendum. Her favourite story was an investigation into how the Ontario Government handled the Dionne quintuplet's trust fund. Thompson's documentary resulted in a $4 million settlement paid to the surviving Dionne sisters by the Ontario Government.

In 2000, Thompson was named the first ever woman correspondent for CTV News in Washington. She covered the end of the Clinton Presidency, the cliff-hanger election of George W. Bush against Al Gore. She was in Washington on the morning of September 11, 2001 when the World Trade Center and the Pentagon were attacked. She covered the initial attack and its aftermath, and was on the south lawn of the White House when secret service agents warned her to leave the area because another plane was heading to Washington. That plane eventually crashed in a field in Pennsylvania.

Thompson comes from a family of successful broadcasters, her sister, Virginia Thompson is the executive producer of Corner Gas a top-rated sitcom on CTV. Her cousin, Shelagh Rogers is the Host and producer for The Next Chapter on CBC Radio. Her brother owns several restaurants in Vancouver.

Thompson is a member of the Board of Research Canada, volunteers for the Ottawa Chapter of The Famous Five Foundation and is a member of Equal Voice. She has served as a Director of the Parliamentary Press Gallery, and served for three years on the Board of the Children's Bridge Foundation.

In 2002, Thompson and her family moved to Ottawa for her to take up the post with CTV News. Her husband is a teacher at a private school in Ottawa. She is a mother of three children, two boys and a girl adopted from China. Her son Maxime died accidentally in Qualicum Beach in 2002.

Since joining the National Arts Centre in 2009 she has worked as the lead organizer of the Royal Visit to the NAC in June 2010, when the Queen unveiled a statue of jazz great, Oscar Peterson, in front of a live audience of 10,000 people. She has re-introduced the tradition of screening great Canadian films at the NAC, including Genius Within: The Inner Life of Glenn Gould, Barney's Version, Starbuck and Breakaway. She brought the Genie Awards for the first time to the NAC in March 2011, which was broadcast nationally on the CBC. She also produced a 9/11 requiem concert with the National Arts Centre Orchestra that was covered by all major media outlets in Canada.
