= Action: The October Crisis of 1970 =

- Directed by: Robin Spry
- Written by: Robin Spry
- Produced by: Tom Daly; Normand Cloutier; Robin Spry
- Narrated by: Robin Spry
- Edited by: Shelagh MacKenzie; Joan Henson; Bernard Bordeleau (sound)
- Distributed by: National Film Board of Canada
- Release date: 1973
- Running time: 87 minutes
- Country: Canada
- Language: English

Action: The October Crisis of 1970 is a 1973 Canadian feature from Robin Spry, produced by the National Film Board of Canada (NFB). It is one of two NFB films by Spry completed in 1973 about the 1970 October Crisis, along with Reaction: A Portrait of a Society in Crisis.

== Synopsis ==
The film looks at the desperate days of the October Crisis, when FLQ terror gripped the streets of Montreal and it seemed that Quebec's search for independence and security of its language and culture might end in insurrection and repression.

Film by National Film Board of Canada crews during the events themselves, and supplemented by news and other actuality films, this documentary of the Crisis shows that, beyond the immediate threat of the FLQ bombings, the kidnappings and finally the murder of Pierre Laporte, a Quebec cabinet minister, there were more widespread resentments that had been a long time in growing. The FLQ objective of an independent, sovereign Quebec was supported by several legitimate political movements. This film puts the Crisis into the long perspective of history.

The protagonists are Pierre Trudeau, Robert Bourassa, René Levesque, Jean Drapeau, Tommy Douglas and others. Their speeches, statements and explanations are interwoven with the kidnappings, the communiqués, the FLQ manifesto, the War Measures Act, the death of Laporte, the arrival of the Canadian Army, the arrests and escapes, and the questions of civil liberties.

== Critical reception ==
Variety called Action: The October Crisis of 1970 "an uncharacteristically strong and gripping National Film Board of Canada feature documentary" and Take One said, "Action is a highly instructive survey of the development in Quebec, from the 1940s to October 1970."

However, Screen, a publication of the Media Study Program of the NFB, said this about the film: "It purports to be a film – that is, some form of artistic statement, no merely a television commercial — about the October Crisis. It is rather a collage of static television images, trivial anecdotes and marginal vocalisms whose consequence is to induce a feeling of well-being. More accurately, it is a successful laxative in which we spend one and one-half hours re-digesting and later discharging the trauma of October 1970. The film leaves us unchanged, unprovoked, other than to reinforce our sedation."

== Contributing filmmakers include ==
Louis Portugais, Bernard Gosselin, Donald Winkler, Michel Régnier, David De Volpi, Douglas Kiefer, Serge Beauchemin, Yves Dion, John Yanyck, Claudio Luca, and Michel Thomas d'Hoste.

== Stock shots and photographs ==
Canadian Broadcasting Corporation, Radio-Canada, La Presse, Toronto Star, CTV, CFCF-DT, Canada Wide Media and Canadian Press.

== Awards ==
- Visions du Réel, Nyon, Switzerland: Grand Prize for Best Documentary, Youth Jury, 1975
- Chicago International Film Festival, Chicago: Silver Plaque, Feature Film, Documentary, 1975
- 26th Canadian Film Awards, Niagara-on-the-Lake, ON: Gemini Award for Best Direction, 1975
