= Drying Up the Streets =

- Directed by: Robin Spry
- Written by: Anne Cameron
- Produced by: Ralph L. Thomas
- Starring: Don Francks; Len Cariou; Sarah Torgov; August Schellenberg; Laurie Brown; Frank Moore; Warren Davis
- Cinematography: Kenneth Gregg
- Edited by: Myrtle Virgo
- Music by: Patrick Russell
- Distributed by: Canadian Broadcasting Corporation
- Release dates: September 1978 (Montréal World Film Festival); February 28, 1979 (CBC-TV)
- Running time: 86 minutes
- Country: Canada
- Language: English
- Budget: $300,000 (estimated)

Drying Up the Streets is a 1978 Canadian feature from Robin Spry produced by the Canadian Broadcasting Corporation.

== Synopsis ==
This film was originally planned as a one-hour drama for the CBC's For the Record, series but was expanded into a feature while it was being shot cinéma vérité-style on the streets of Toronto between October 11 and October 27, 1977. It concerns the search for a runaway (Laurie Brown) by her father (Don Francks), an aging hippy who is coerced to do so by a member of the RCMP drug squad (Len Cariou). Exploring the darker side of the ‘flower power’ generation, Drying Up the Streets mixes documentary realism with stylized set pieces.

It's one of director Robin Spry’s finest films; however, it never received theatrical distribution and was eventually aired on the CBC in 1979 to good notices.

== Awards and nominations ==
Year	Award	Category	Individual	Result
1978	29th Canadian Film Awards	Actress, Non-Feature	Sarah Torgov	Nominated
1980	9th ACTRA Awards	Best Acting Performance on Television in a Leading Role (Earle Grey Award)	Don Francks	Won
1980	9th ACTRA Awards	Best New Television Performer	Sarah Torgov	Won
1980	9th ACTRA Awards	Best Television Program of the Year	Ralph L. Thomas	Won
