= CBC Regina =

CBC Regina refers to:

- CBK and CBKR-FM, CBC Radio One on 540 AM and 102.5 FM
- CBK-FM, CBC Radio 2 on 96.9 FM
- CBKT, CBC Television on channel 9

SRC Regina refers to:

- CBKF-FM, Première Chaîne on 97.7 FM
- CKSB-1, Espace Musique on 88.9 FM, rebroadcasts CKSB-FM
- CBKFT, Télévision de Radio-Canada on channel 13
