= Reaction: A Portrait of a Society in Crisis =

1973 Canadian documentary film

- Directed by: Robin Spry
- Written by: Robin Spry
- Produced by: Tom Daly
- Cinematography: Douglas Kiefer
- Edited by: Joan Henson; Shelagh MacKenzie
- Music by: Bernard Bordeleau
- Distributed by: National Film Board of Canada
- Release date: 1973
- Running time: 58 minutes
- Country: Canada
- Language: English
- Budget: $65728 CAD

Reaction: A Portrait of a Society in Crisis is a 1973 Canadian documentary film directed by Robin Spry and produced by the National Film Board of Canada. The companion film to Spry's Action: The October Crisis of 1970, it explores the reactions of English-speaking Quebecers to the 1970 October Crisis and the threat of the Quebec nationalist group, Front de libération du Québec.

== Overview ==
The film captures the sometimes personal reactions of groups of English-speaking Quebecers, identified by their different ages and social classes. They express their reactions to the actions of the FLQ and those taken by the Trudeau government.

The film summarizes the events of the crisis and contains TV footage of Trudeau speaking, explaining his decision to make use of the War Measures Act. The film captures a group watching the footage in Westmount, a wealthy enclave on the Island of Montreal. The group argues over whether what happened in Quebec could also happen outside of the province. The professors in the group perceive their political weakness as a minority in Quebec. The fears discussed are that the United States will intervene in Canadian affair or that Quebec nationalism will leave them isolated in the province.

In a poorer English-speaking suburb of Montreal, a group discuss democracy and how citizens were not given the right to vote on the use of the War Measures Act, and how this could facilitate a police state. However one woman supports the deployment of the troops, judging it as an appropriate action to the excesses of the FLQ. A man rebukes her when she says the troops make her feel safe, he argues that they are only stationed to protect the homes of the city's wealthy elite. The group also discuss whether or not the FLQ detainees should be released or not.

The film then bases attention on a group of business executives. They regard the government's actions in the wake of the crisis as 'courageous and very right'. They also express that the local anglophone community should make an effort to preserve Quebec from such anarchy.

== Production ==
On 15 October 1970, as 6 000 federal troops entered stationed in Montreal, Robin Spry's request to film the unfolding drama was rejected by the English Programme Committee of the National Film Board of Canada. However, it soon emerged that the French Programme Committee of the board had commissioned filming, and so Spry was told he was able to film.

After filming, Spry was briefly not able to work on editing the footage as it was sub judice with legal trials occurring in the wake of the crisis. Spry began assembling the footage the next summer, charged with the task of forming a coherent representation of footage taken by thirty Film Board staff. Spry had been left alone on the project after Jacques Godbout, Mireille Dansereau and Pierre Maheu had recently withdrew. The film shares footage of the crisis with Action: The October Crisis of 1970.
