= American Gothic (1988 film) =

1988 Canadian film directed by John Hough

- U.S. theatrical release poster
- Directed by: John Hough
- Written by: Burt Wetanson; Michael Vines
- Produced by: Christopher Harrop; John Quested
- Starring: Rod Steiger; Yvonne De Carlo; Michael J. Pollard; Fiona Hutchison; Sarah Torgov
- Cinematography: Harvey Harrison
- Edited by: John Victor-Smith
- Music by: Alan Parker
- Production companies: Brent Walker PLC; Pinetalk Ltd.; Manor Ground Prods.; Vidmark Entertainment
- Distributed by: Norstar Releasing (Canada); Virgin Video (United Kingdom)
- Release dates: 1 August 1987 (Shock Around the Clock Festival); 12 February 1988 (United Kingdom); 20 May 1988 (U.S.)
- Running time: 89 minutes
- Countries: United Kingdom; Canada
- Language: English

American Gothic is a 1988 slasher film directed by John Hough and starring Rod Steiger, Yvonne De Carlo, Sarah Torgov, Janet Wright, and Michael J. Pollard. The film follows a group of travelers who become stranded on an island in the Puget Sound where they find themselves in the clutches of a demented family of murderers. The film's poster is a pastiche of the Grant Wood painting of the same name.

A co-production between Canada and the United Kingdom, American Gothic was filmed on Bowen Island, British Columbia. In the United Kingdom, the film was released directly to video by Virgin Video under the alternative title Hide and Shriek on 12 February 1988. It was distributed theatrically in the United States by Vidmark Entertainment beginning 20 May 1988, and premiered on home video in September 1988.

== Plot ==
Cynthia, traumatized by the death of her baby after leaving her in a bathtub where she accidentally drowned, decides to go on a vacation with five of her friends: Jeff, Rob, Lynn, Paul and Terri. They charter a plane in Seattle, but are plagued by engine troubles and are forced to land on a lonely island in the Puget Sound. They set-up camp. The next morning, Paul stays at the camp while the others set off to find help. They come upon a large cottage nestled in the woods.

After entering the cottage and fooling around a bit, they meet the owners, an elderly married couple going by the simple names of Ma and Pa. The group of friends are welcomed to spend the night. At dinner, Lynn starts smoking and Pa scolds her and demands that she smoke outside. Later, Lynn and Cynthia discover Ma and Pa have a child, Fanny, who looks like a middle-aged woman but claims she is only 12. That night, Ma and Pa insist on some strict rules in, such as no cussing and forcing the girls and boys apart to prevent premarital sex.

The next morning, Rob goes for a walk and finds Fanny pushing her brother, Woody, on a crudely crafted swing. Rob is invited to swing and he agrees, only for Woody to climb to the top and chop the rope, sending Rob down the rocky cliff below to his death.

The group finds out about Rob's death and mourn his loss. Later, Lynn and Cynthia are outside, Lynn talks about how this family is a bunch of freaks and Fanny overhears. Cynthia sees this after Lynn leaves and consoles Fanny and reluctantly agrees to play games with her. Fanny shows Cynthia her baby, thought to be just a doll, but it turns out to be the remains of an infant. Cynthia meets another brother, Teddy, and Fanny explains to him that Cynthia is her friend. Meanwhile, Lynn stumbles upon Woody, Teddy, and Fanny playing jump rope in the woods. After Lynn insults them, she is attacked and presumably killed by the three.

Cynthia tells Jeff about the mummified infant. Jeff tries to console Cynthia and they kiss. Fanny, who wants Jeff to herself, sees and becomes jealous. She confronts the two and kills Jeff by stabbing him in the eye with a sword on a knight statue. Cynthia explains her fear to Ma, but Ma attacks her, saying they are all wicked people. Cynthia flees, and Ma finishes Jeff off with her knitting needles. Cynthia runs into the woods, finding Lynn's corpse hanging from a tree and a frightened Terri. Cynthia explains everything to Terri and learns that Paul and the plane are missing. Woody and Teddy find the girls and chase them into the woods. Terri and Cynthia find Fanny, and Terri reveals a gun and holds Fanny at gunpoint, forcing her to help them get off the island. They show Fanny to Ma and Pa and demand their help to get off the island. To save his daughter, Pa tells the girls where a boat is. He leads them to a dinky fisherman's boat, where Paul's corpse is lying, an ax buried in his skull. Cynthia and Terri flee, and Teddy and Woody light Paul's body on fire.

Night comes, and Terri and Cynthia spend the night in a hollow tree. Terri and Cynthia run back to the cottage to find a radio but are attacked by Woody and Teddy. Teddy pursues Terri into the woods, and Fanny toys with Cynthia. Terri is caught by Teddy and has her neck snapped. Teddy rapes Terri's corpse, Woody tattletales, and Teddy gets a beating as Cynthia watches in horror. Cynthia eventually breaks down and becomes one of the family, celebrating Fanny's birthday and dressing in a pink gown to match Fanny. However, the flashbacks of her baby drowning get to her; she goes mad, bludgeoning Fanny to death with a metal washtub. She then murders Woody with the sword. She then confronts Ma and stabs her to death with her knitting needles. She finds Teddy and stabs him with a sickle. Pa discovers his family dead and goes outside only to be shot by his own shotgun by Cynthia, who has taken revenge and killed the demented family. The film ends as Cynthia goes upstairs, sits in Fanny's room, and slowly begins rocking the cradle, singing a soft lullaby.

== Cast ==
- Rod Steiger as Pa
- Yvonne De Carlo as Ma
- Sarah Torgov as Cynthia
- Janet Wright as Fanny
- Michael J. Pollard as Woody
- William Hootkins as Teddy
- Mark Erickson as Jeff
- Caroline Barclay as Terri
- Mark Lindsay Chapman as Rob
- Fiona Hutchison as Lynn
- Stephen Shellen as Paul

== Production ==
The film was shot in the winter of 1986–1987 on Bowen Island near Vancouver, British Columbia, Canada. Actress Sarah Torgov described the shoot as physically taxing due to the tight schedule and cold weather conditions, and recalled that she slept an average of four hours per night. "Most nights we worked so late that we had to dash frantically, still in costume, to catch the last public ferry of the day. If we happened to be wearing pajamas in the last shot of the day, that was what we went home in."

== Release ==
American Gothic screened in London at the Shock Around the Clock Festival, an exploitation film festival, on 1 August 1987. It was released theatrically in the United States through Vidmark Entertainment, opening in Chicago, Illinois and South Bend, Indiana, on 20 May 1988. It subsequently opened in other cities such as Los Angeles, New York City and San Francisco in the following weeks. It continued to screen in several U.S. cities, including Owensboro, Kentucky; Pittsburgh, Pennsylvania; Sacramento, California; and Cleveland, Ohio, through the summer of 1988.

=== Home media ===
The film was released on VHS in the United Kingdom on 12 February 1988 by Virgin Video under the alternative title Hide and Shriek. Fangoria stated the film was being prepared for a July or August released on home video by Vidmark Home Entertainment. American Gothic was released on VHS and Betamax by Vidmark Entertainment on 7 September 1988.

It was released for the first time on DVD by Trinity Home Entertainment on 28 September 2004. It was released by Stax Entertainment in the United Kingdom on 27 March 2006, running 85 minutes. E1 Entertainment the film on DVD in Canada on 14 October 2008. Shout! Factory released the film for the first time on Blu-ray on 19 December 2017.

== Reception ==
Caryn James from The New York Times gave the film a negative review, stating that the film "offers just a few meager possibilities for unintentional campy comedy". The Los Angeles Times's Michael Wilmington summarized: "Devotees of mindless, squalid movies might find something to enjoy in the consciously camp shocker American Gothic... so might people trying to get away from the summer heat. Anyone else is in trouble," but conceded that the performances "probably deserve backhanded praise. To be good with a good script is relatively easy. To be reasonably good with material this atrocious is a sign of true professionalism."

Joe Baltake of The Sacramento Bee found the film distasteful, describing it as "a formula horror movie that is creepier than most and boasts a few good performances and is still awful," ultimately deeming it "just plain sick." Author and film critic Leonard Maltin awarded the film a BOMB, his lowest rating, writing, "Populated exclusively by obnoxious characters; even Steiger can't help this one." VideoHound's Golden Movie Retriever, awarded the film their lowest rating, calling it "A stultifying career low for all involved." Vincent J. Bossone of Cinefantastique felt that the lead performances of Steiger and De Carlo are "not enough to salvage this well-worn yarn," adding that "The banal plotting is occasionally relieved by welcome moments of off-beat and an unpleasant bit involving a mummified baby."

A critic for the New York Daily News noted that while the plot is "pedestrian," the film "comes through with an impressive array of truly sicko surprises... Rod Steiger and Yvonne De Carlo are consistently entertaining in what may be the most humiliating roles of their already checkered careers." TV Guide awarded the film two out of five stars, writing: "Despite the rather obvious plotting, derivative of everything from Psycho and more recent Spam-in-a-cabin epics to The Most Dangerous Game, this Canadian effort is mildly interesting. Without a doubt, however, the performances of Steiger and Torgov are the most noteworthy aspects of the film. Steiger's Bible-spouting, moralizing patriarch is superb, given the weakness of the material in general. Torgov's part is better written, and she makes the most of it, letting us see madness in her eyes better than anyone since Barbara Steele."

In Slimetime: A Guide to Sleazy, Mindless Movies (2002), writer Steven Puchalski notes that director John Hough "has more on his mind than a body count. There's a genuinely creepy imagination at work here too... Hough goes for a decidedly non-hack approach in the first half before slicing straight into the jugular for the wrap-up, with the last fifteen minutes taking unexpected turns into solid dementia."

== Sources ==
- Biel, Steven (2005). American Gothic: A Life of America's Most Famous Painting. New York City, New York: W. W. Norton & Company. ISBN 978-0-393-05912-0.
- Craddock, Jim (2011). VideoHound's Golden Movie Retriever. Detroit, Michigan: Gale/Cengage Learning. ISBN 978-1-4144-4878-7.
- Maltin, Leonard (2017). Leonard Maltin's Movie Guide: The Modern Era, Previously Published as Leonard Maltin's 2015 Movie Guide. New York City, New York: Penguin Publishing Group. ISBN 978-0-525-53631-4.
- Puchalski, Steven (2002). Slimetime: A Guide to Sleazy, Mindless Movies. Manchester, England: Headpress/Critical Vision. ISBN 978-1-900-48621-7.
