= Terry Matte =

Terry Matte (c. 1943 – December 28, 2009) was a news producer for CBWT's 24Hours program in Winnipeg in the 1980s before moving to Ottawa where he was senior producer for "Newsday", CBC Ottawa's supper-hour, television newscast. Previous to that, he was The National's Manitoba correspondent responsible for coverage of Northwestern Ontario and Canada's North.

== Life ==
Matter was born in Victoria, B.C. and graduated from the University of Toronto. He has a son, Andrew Matte, who works as an editor for Regina Leader Post.

== Career ==
He started his career in newspapers in the late 1960s, and was a reporter and assistant city editor at the Toronto Telegram at the time of the newspaper's demise in 1971 when he started his career at the CBC.

At the time of his retirement in 1997, he was a producer and host of The Money Report, a widely popular consumer segment on CBC's Newsday. He died December 28, 2009, in Ottawa of cancer. He had been diagnosed in February and was 66 years old at the time of his death.
