= Mike McCourt =

Canadian television journalist

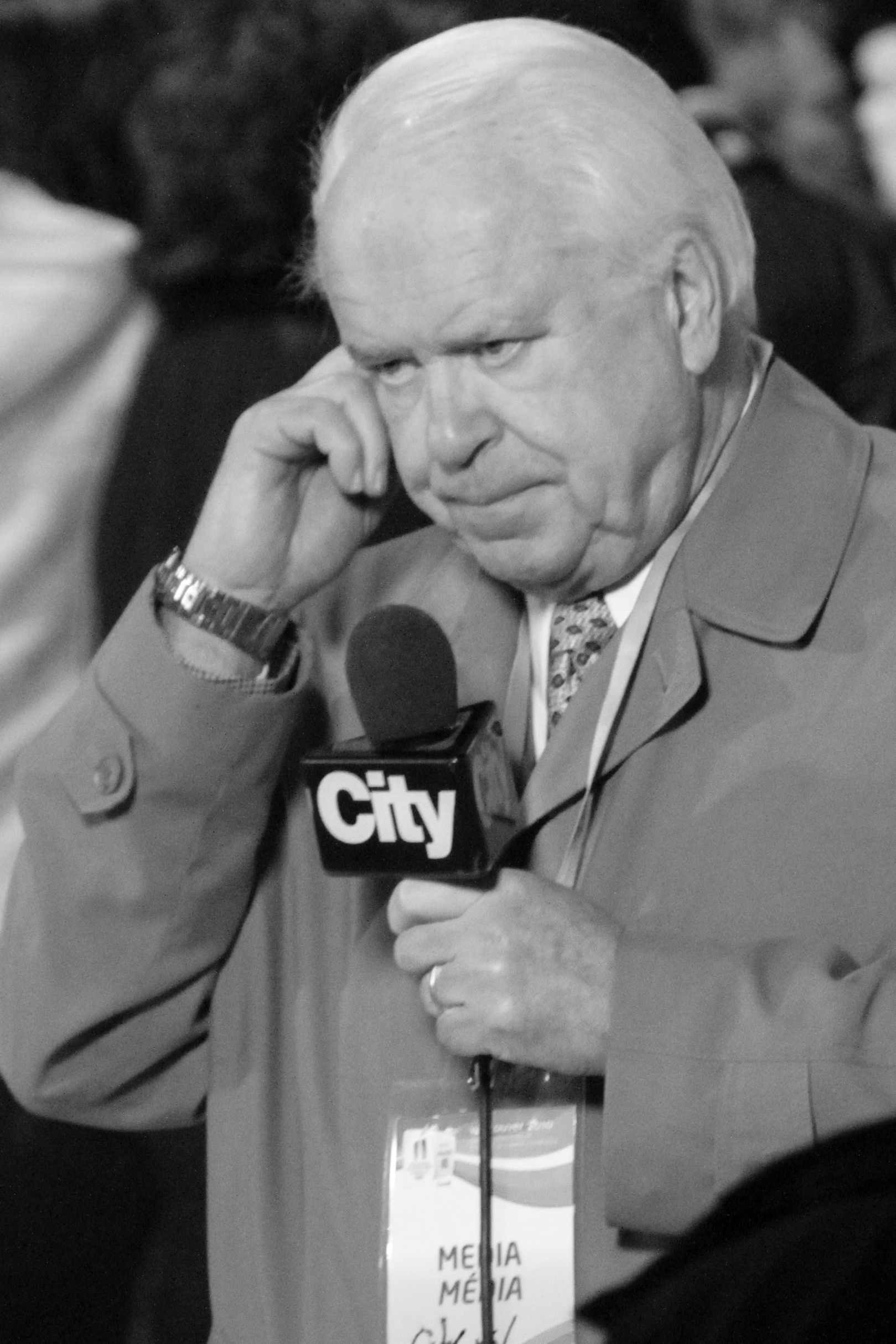
- Mike McCourt in Calgary (2010)

Mike McCourt is a TV journalist working at Citytv outlet CKAL-TV in Calgary, Alberta, Canada. He co-hosted the local CBWT local news program 24Hours in Winnipeg from 1987 to 1992. He was also the main ABC correspondent during the Israeli invasion of Lebanon in 1982.
