= Jim Reed (journalist) =

Canadian journalist, producer and news anchor

- Born: Robert James Reed; 20 October 1938; Goderich, Ontario, Canada
- Died: 12 February 2011 (aged 72); Toronto, Ontario, Canada
- Occupation: Television journalist
- Years active: 1972–2011
- Employer(s): CTV Television Network (1972–1990); CBC News (1990–2002)
- Notable credit(s): W5 producer, co-host (1972–1990)

Robert James Reed was a Canadian journalist, producer and news anchor, best known for his work on W5, a CTV Television Network current affairs program.

== Early life ==
Reed was born in Goderich, Ontario in 1938. He had three sons.

== Broadcasting career ==
Reed joined W5, a national Canadian newsmagazine and current affairs program, in 1972 as a producer. His notable achievements with W5 included an interview with Susan Nelles, a nurse falsely accused in the Toronto hospital baby deaths in 1980 and 1981, and the first North American interview with Yasser Arafat in 1981. Subsequent to this, Reed worked for 12 years as a journalist at CBC News, and also worked for TVO and as a freelance journalist for The Associated Press, The New York Times, and The Globe and Mail.

During his career, he was awarded three Gemini Awards and a Gordon Sinclair Award for excellence in journalism.

Reed died on 12 February 2011 in Toronto of non-small cell lung cancer.

== Career timeline ==
- 1972: CTV Television Network, W5, producer
- 1972–1990: CTV Television Network, W5, anchor
- 1990–2002: CBC News, journalist

== Awards ==
=== Public and industry awards ===
- Gordon Sinclair Award, 1986
