= Ed Russenholt =

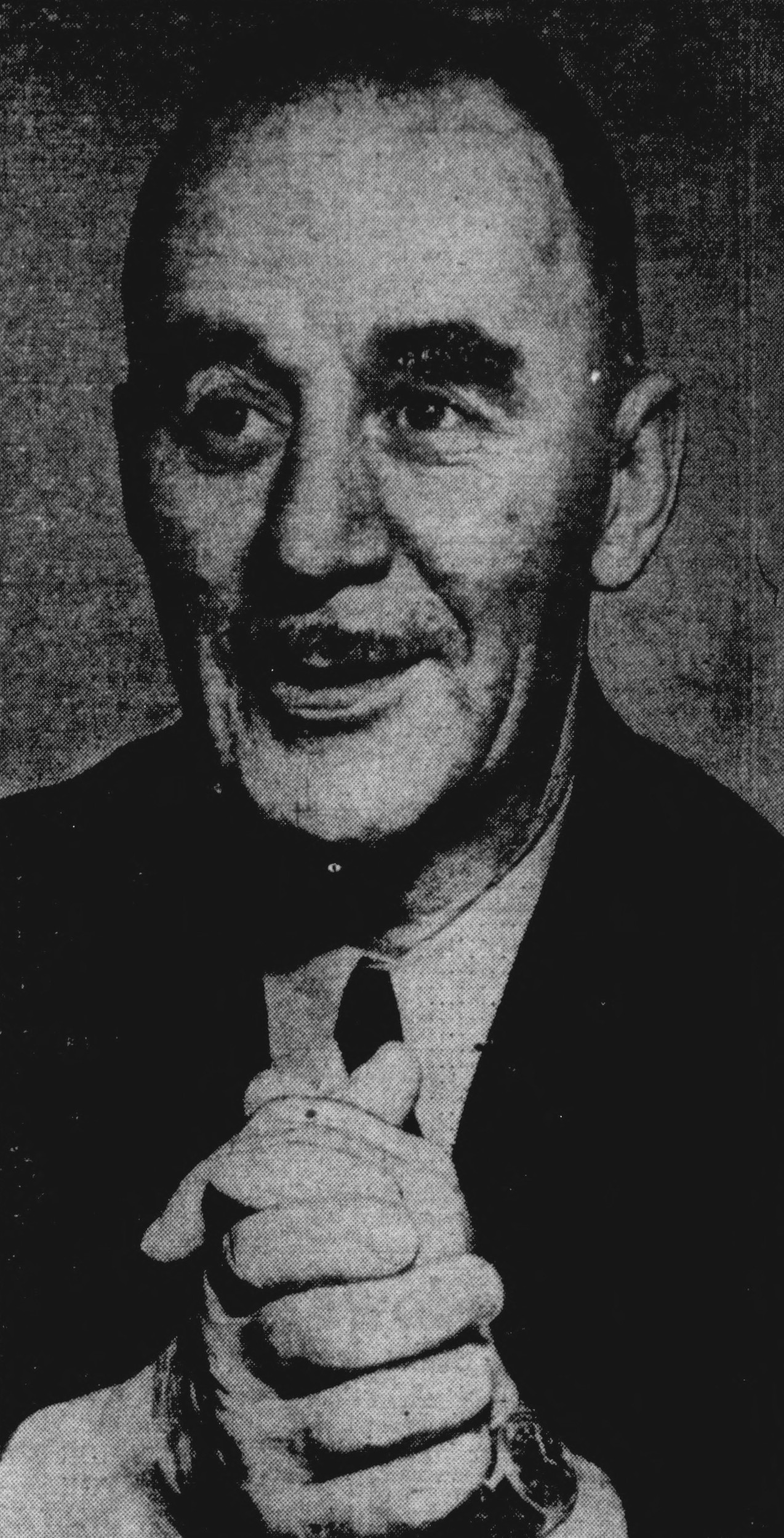
Russenholt, circa 1946

Ed Stanford Russenholt (May 18, 1890 – February 3, 1991, aged 101) was best known as CBC Manitoba's first weather person. He was born in Uxbridge, Ontario. He was replaced in that task in 1962 by news reader Maurice Burchell.

He wrote a book on the history of Assiniboia, The Heart of the Continent: being the history of Assiniboia - the truly typical Canadian community, and edited a book on Rockwood, Manitoba, Re-echoes from Rockwood.
