= Prologue (1969 film) =

- Directed by: Robin Spry
- Written by: Michael Malus
- Produced by: Tom Daly; Robin Spry
- Starring: John Robb; Elaine Malus; Gary Rader; Peter Cullen; Christopher Cordeaux; Abbie Hoffman
- Cinematography: Douglas Keifer
- Edited by: Christopher Cordeaux
- Music by: Bill Brooks; Michael Malus
- Distributed by: National Film Board of Canada
- Release date: 1969
- Running time: 87 minutes
- Country: Canada
- Language: English
- Budget: $140,000

Prologue is a 1969 National Film Board of Canada feature from Robin Spry, shot and set in Montreal and Chicago, blending drama with documentary sequences from the 1968 Democratic National Convention protests.

== Plot ==
Jesse (John Robb) edits and sells an underground newspaper on the streets of Montreal. He firmly believes in 'direct action' as a means of changing 'the system.' He and his girlfriend (Elaine Maulus), meet an American draft dodger, David (Gary Rader), who is into 'spiritualism.' Torn between the two, Karen leaves Montreal to join David on a commune while Jesse travels to Chicago for the 1968 Democratic National Convention. Tired of David's abstract ideas, Karen leaves him and returns to her life with Jesse.

== Release ==
The film premiered at the 30th Venice International Film Festival.

== Reception ==
Canadian film historian Peter Morris wrote in 1984 about Prologue in The Film Companion, "One of the most important films of the sixties, widely released abroad and well-received by most foreign critics, that at the time was praised for its sensitivity and unpretentious realism, but that in retrospect seems more important for its persuasive and convincing encapsulation of the period's central (if false) dilemma: to drop out or change the system. Despite its documentary-like style, it was carefully scripted (before the Chicago convention); and in theme, style and acting, remains, more than a decade later, a testament to the (unfulfilled) potential of Canadian cinema of the time."

"Beside the modest and very Canadian self-questioning of Prologue, previous films about drop-outs and the under thirties' revolution in North America begin to appear guilty of over-sell, colour advertisements for a glamorous, swinging and homogenized life-style. It is not simply that Robin Spry's first feature has the inestimable advantage of being shot in down-beat black and white, but rather that his principal characters are too concerned with working out a tenable way of life for themselves to begin laying very much on other people. Far from being anti-social, they are shown to possess a highly developed sense of social responsibility and a faith in the principles of a democracy whose practices they deplore." Sight And Sound

"This intelligent Canadian film attempts to consider objectively the cases for militant revolution and peaceable dropping-out. Unfortunately, its objectivity is very nearly overthrown by the amount of footage devoted to clever actuality material from the hackle-raising Democratic Convention of 1968 in Chicago, an occasion used more imaginatively by Haskell Wexler in Medium Cool but still potent enough in this different context to sway the sympathy in favour of the activists." Films and Filming

"Black-and-white photography by Douglas Keifer consistently supports the cinéma vérité style but is equally effective in staged scenes with principles. Music and sound track have an authentic ring. [John] Robb and [Gary] Rader give standout performances for non-pros. Prologue is a safe bet for art houses and the university circuit. It might even join such pix as Easy Rider in bigger circuits." Variety

== Awards ==
- 23rd British Academy Film Awards, London: BAFTA Award for Best Documentary, 1969
- Film Critics and Journalists Association of Ceylon, Colombo, Sri Lanka: First Prize
- 22nd Canadian Film Awards, Toronto: Best Editing to Christopher Cordeaux, 1970

== Works cited ==
- Evans, Gary (1991). In the National Interest: A Chronicle of the National Film Board of Canada from 1949 to 1989. University of Toronto Press. ISBN 0802027849.
