= Warner Troyer =

Canadian journalist (1932–1991)

- Born: 16 January 1932; Cochrane, Ontario
- Died: 15 September 1991 (aged 59); Toronto, Ontario
- Occupations: Broadcaster, documentary producer, author
- Spouse(s): Margaret Graham, Martha Jennings, Glenys Moss
- Children: Marc, Scott, Jill, Jennifer, John, Peggy, Peter and Anne
- Parent(s): Gordon and Ruth

Warner Troyer (16 January 1932 – 15 September 1991) was a Canadian broadcast journalist and writer.

== Biography ==
Troyer was born in Cochrane, Ontario, the son of Gordon Troyer, a Presbyterian circuit minister. He lost his leg at a young age, and later worked with Patrick Watson who also had a missing leg.

Troyer began his career as an overnight radio disc jockey in Saskatchewan, then became the first radio reporter in the Manitoba legislature and was not even allowed in the press gallery. He then moved to the Winnipeg Free Press and worked as a news reporter for CKRC radio 630kc. He was later featured on the 1960s CBC Television current affairs program This Hour Has Seven Days. In 1975, Troyer co-hosted the first season of the fifth estate with Adrienne Clarkson, also on CBC. He was also involved in the production of CBWT's Eye-To-Eye program and was for a time executive producer and co-host of W5 on CTV.

In 1976, Troyer provided commentaries following episodes of The Prisoner as they were broadcast on commercial-free TVOntario. He also interviewed Patrick McGoohan about the series for a TVOntario broadcast in 1977 and was credited as a consultant in the 1976 TVOntario publication The Prisoner Puzzle.

No Safe Place (ISBN 0-772-01117-6), published in 1977, was a book by Troyer about mercury poisoning in Northern Ontario waters. His 1980 book 200 Days: Joe Clark in Power (ISBN 0-920510-05-1) was an examination of the short-lived Progressive Conservative administration of Prime Minister Joe Clark, which was a 1979 minority government, defeated in a motion of non-confidence late that year. He also wrote a book on the history of Canadian radio and television broadcasting, The Sound & the Fury: An Anecdotal History of Canadian Broadcasting (ISBN 0-471-99872-9), published in 1982.

Troyer married his first wife, Margaret and had six children: Marc, Scott, Jill, Jennifer, Peggy and John. He also had two children, Peter and Anne, with his second wife.

In the early 1980s, Troyer and his third wife, Glenys Moss, established a journalism school in Sri Lanka.

In his later years he focused on environmental issues. Troyer was listed as a consultant for The Canadian Green Consumer Guide (ISBN 0771071620), published in 1989, and wrote Preserving Our World: A Consumer's Guide to the Brundtland Report (ISBN 0-969453-80-9), published in 1990.

Troyer contracted throat cancer and died in Toronto at age 59.
