= CBWF =

CBWF may refer to:

- CBWF (AM), a radio rebroadcaster (920 AM) licensed to MacKenzie, British Columbia, Canada, rebroadcasting CBYG-FM
- CBWF-FM, a radio rebroadcaster (90.9 FM) licensed to Flin Flon, Manitoba, Canada, rebroadcasting CBWK-FM
- CBWF, Christian Business Women's Fellowship
