= Anne Petrie =

Anne Petrie (born December 24, 1946) is a broadcaster and was most known as the host of Canada Live and Coast to Coast on CBC Newsworld during its early years. Prior to that she was the primary news anchor and host of CBWT's 24Hours LateNight from October 1985 to July 1989.

She has written several books. She has also hosted Anne Petrie's Talk TV and Absolutely Canadian, both on CBC Newsworld, and The Moral Divide, a co-production with VisionTV.

She is the daughter of actress Doris Petrie.

== Publications ==
- Ethnic Vancouver (ISBN 0888391595)
- Vancouver Secrets (ISBN 091949319X)
- More Vancouver Secrets (ISBN 0919493750)
- A guidebook to ethnic Vancouver : walking, shopping, and eating tours of the ethnic neighborhoods of Vancouver (ISBN 0888391595)
- Gone to an Aunt's: Remembering Canada's Homes for Unwed Mothers (ISBN 0771069715).
