= 9th ACTRA Awards =

Canadian television awards ceremony

- Date: April 9, 1980
- Hosted by: Dave Broadfoot

Highlights
- Best TV Program: Drying Up the Streets
- Best Radio Program: Sunday Morning: "Aftermath of Jonestown"

Television/radio coverage
- Network: CBC Television

The 9th ACTRA Awards were presented on April 9, 1980. The ceremony was hosted by Dave Broadfoot.

== Television ==
Best Television Program	Earle Grey Award
Drying Up the Streets; Dieppe; The Music of Man	Don Francks, Drying Up the Streets; Brent Carver, Crossbar; Bruno Gerussi, The Newcomers
Best Supporting Performer	Best New Performer
Paul Harding, A Man Called Intrepid; Gerard Parkes, A Gift to Last; Christopher Plummer, Riel	Sarah Torgov, Drying Up the Streets; Megan Follows, Matt and Jenny; Liliane Stilwell, Piaf
Best TV Variety Performance	Best Television Host or Interviewer
Burton Cummings, Burton Cummings: Portage and Main; Salome Bey, Dream Weaver; Toller Cranston, Dream Weaver; Karen Kain, Karen Kain Requests the Pleasure	Brian Linehan, City Lights; Larry Stout, Newsmagazine; Patrick Watson, The Watson Report
Best Children's Television Program	Best Writing, Television Drama
Intergalactic Thanksgiving; Matt and Jenny; The Stowaway	Ralph L. Thomas and Roy MacGregor, Every Person Is Guilty; Roy Moore, Riel; Gordon Pinsent, A Gift to Last
Best Writing, Television Comedy/Variety	Best Writing, Television Public Affairs
Johnny Wayne, Frank Shuster, Kate Lonsdale and Ted Lonsdale, Wayne and Shuster; John Candy, Joe Flaherty, Eugene Levy, Andrea Martin, Catherine O'Hara, Harold Ramis and Dave Thomas, Second City Television; Stan Jacobson, Rick Moranis and Paul Perlove, Burton Cummings: Portage and Main	Barbara Young, Newsday: "Penny Kitchen"; Yehudi Menuhin and Charles Weir, The Music of Man: "Parting of the Ways"; Dini Petty, Incest: Scandal in the Family

== Radio ==
Best Radio Program	Best Radio Host or Interviewer
Sunday Morning: "Aftermath of Jonestown"; Ideas: "Search for Tutankhamun"; The Pat Lowther Poem	Barbara Frum and Alan Maitland, As It Happens; Lynne Gordon, Israel; Don Harron, Morningside
Best Radio Actor	Best Writing, Radio Drama
Kate Reid, Grasshopper Hill; Douglas Rain, Coming Through Slaughter; Henry Ramer, Grasshopper Hill	Betty Lambert, Grasshopper Hill; Silver Donald Cameron, The Sisters; Sheldon Rosen, Ned and Jack
Best Writing, Radio Public Affairs
Terence McKenna, Sunday Morning: "Aftermath of Jonestown"; Tom Keenan and Mary McGuire, Alberta Towns; Stuart McLean, Sunday Morning: "The Marijuana Run"

== Journalism and special awards ==
Gordon Sinclair Award	Foster Hewitt Award
Ricki Katz; Susan Millican; Don Anderson; Morton Shulman; Gerry Sperling	Dave Hodge; Don Chevrier; Bob Cole
John Drainie Award
Norman Campbell
