= CKSB-10-FM =

Ici Radio-Canada Première station in Winnipeg

- Saint Boniface, Winnipeg, Manitoba; Canada
- Broadcast area: Winnipeg Metropolitan Region
- Frequency: 88.1 MHz

Programming
- Language: French
- Format: Public broadcasting
- Network: Ici Radio-Canada Première

Ownership
- Owner: Canadian Broadcasting Corporation
- Sister stations: CBW, CBW-FM, CKSB-FM, CBWT-DT, CBWFT-DT

History
- First air date: May 27, 1946
- Former call signs: CKSB (1946–2014)
- Former frequencies: 1250 kHz (AM) (1946–1958); 1050 kHz (1958–2014); 90.5 MHz (FM) (2006–2014)
- Call sign meaning: St. Boniface

Technical information
- Class: C1
- ERP: 100,000 watts
- HAAT: 223 metres (732 ft)
- Transmitter coordinates: 49°46′14.9″N 97°30′37.1″W

Links
- Website: Ici Radio-Canada Première

CKSB-10-FM (88.1 MHz) is a Canadian public radio station serving the Winnipeg Metropolitan Region in Manitoba. It is owned by the Société Radio-Canada (CBC) and airs the Ici Radio-Canada Première network, concentrating on news and talk in French. It had been licensed to Saint Boniface, which was a separate city until it was annexed by Winnipeg in 1971. Even though the call sign includes a number, usually indicating the station is a rebroadcaster, CKSB-10-FM originates some of its own local programming and contributes to the Ici Radio-Canada Première network.

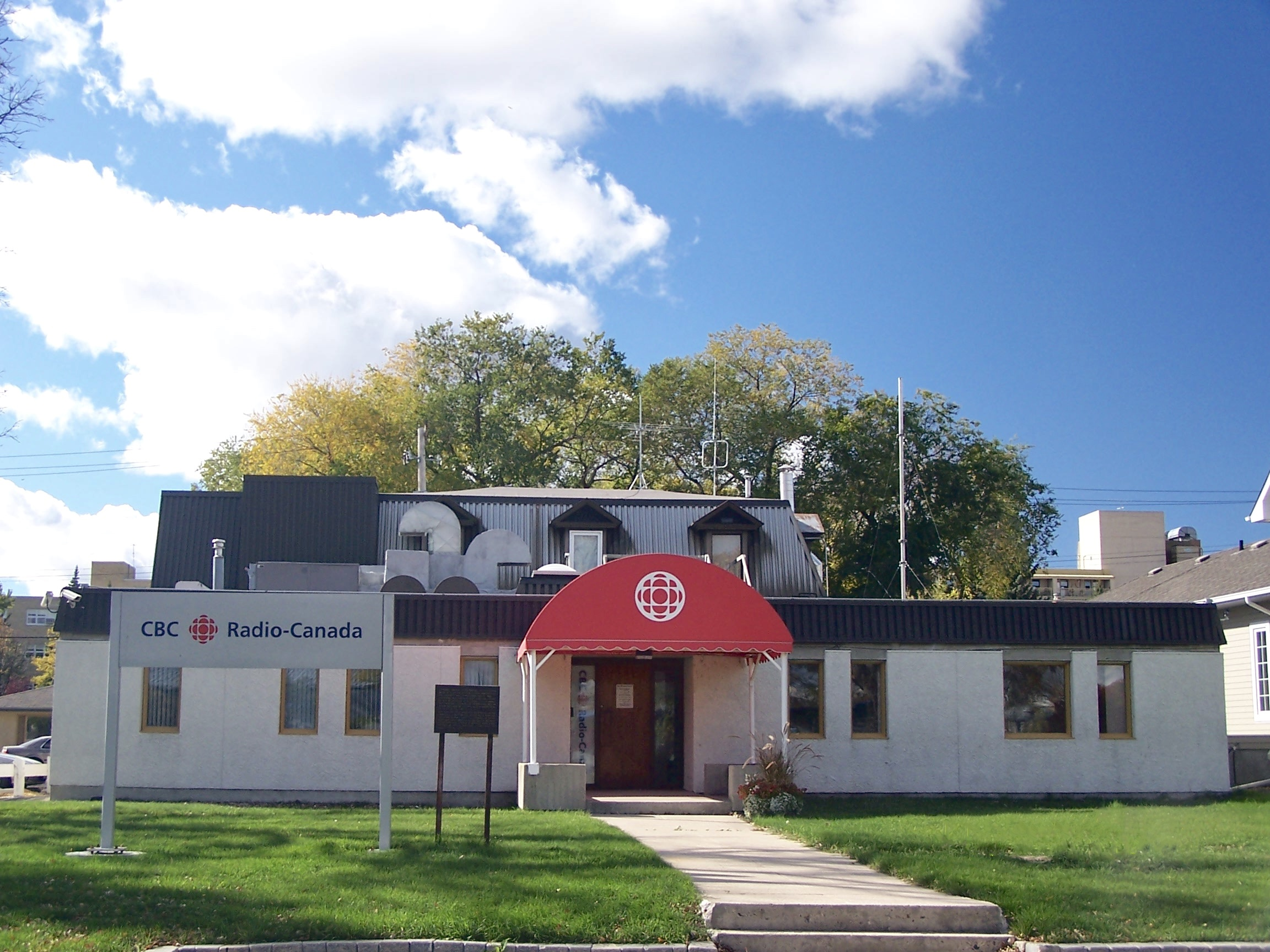
Ici Radio-Canada Premiere studio, rue Langevin, St. Boniface, Man. (ca. 2006)

Studios and offices are located on Rue Langevin in Saint Boniface. Since 2014 the transmitter was relocated to the community of Starbuck, MB, improving the signal of the Ici Radio-Canada Premiere network to Manitoba's French community. CKSB-10-FM has an effective radiated power of 100,000 watts. CBWFT-DT continues to broadcast from the Richardson Building (1 Lombard Place) in downtown Winnipeg.

== History ==
A year prior to its first broadcast, St. Boniface Radio Corp., the company that owned the initial station requested purchase of an 3.2 ha (8-acre) parcel of land to be used for the station's transmitter at the corner of St. Anne's Road and Havelock. However at a meeting of the R. M. of St. Vital Council the proposal was denied.

CKSB signed-on at 6 p.m. on May 27, 1946, as a French-language commercial AM station, broadcasting from 607 College St. in St. Boniface. The building site was originally part of the St. Boniface College that burned down in 1922. It originally broadcast on a frequency of 1250 kHz with a power of 1,000 watts. The antenna was originally located three miles from the studio, at Dawson Rd. It was the first francophone station west of Ontario. It also aired programming in Ukrainian, Polish, German, Portuguese, Hebrew and Italian.

Two AM rebroadcast transmitters were added in the late 1960s, CBXF (Ste. Rose du Lac, now CKSB-1-FM at 92.7) on February 1, 1968, and CBKB (St. Lazare, now CKSB-2) on March 12, 1969. Both stations operated on 860 kHz. In 1958, the station moved to 1050 AM and boosted its power to 10,000 watts at all times. During the day, the station broadcast with a relatively omnidirectional pattern, but at night, it used a directional antenna, sending its signal toward the north, in order to protect Mexican Class A station XEG near Monterrey.

CKSB was independently owned and operated until 1973, when the CBC/Radio-Canada network purchased the station to expand its French network service.

On March 16, 2006, the Canadian Radio-television and Telecommunications Commission (CRTC) approved an application by the station to implement a nested city-grade 2.8 kW FM rebroadcaster at 90.5 MHz in Winnipeg, CKSB-10-FM, to simulcast the AM programming. This FM signal was set up due to address reception problems in parts of Winnipeg.

In September 2012, the CBC applied to replace CKSB's AM transmitter and its nested FM repeater with a new 100 kW FM signal on 88.1 MHz. This application was approved by the CRTC on March 18, 2013. The station began simulcasting in October 2013, then ceased operation on 1050 and 90.5 on January 3, 2014.

The station uses the call sign of its now-former Winnipeg translator, CKSB-10-FM, because the call letters "CKSB-FM" are already used for Radio-Canada's Ici Musique outlet at 89.9 MHz, and the call sign "CBWF" was already used for two different CBC radio repeaters.

== Programming ==
The station's current local programs are Le 6 à 9, in the mornings from 6:00 a.m. to 9 a.m. and L'Actuel in the afternoons, 3:30 p.m. to 6 p.m. The Saturday morning program, Culture et confiture, originates from CBUF-FM Vancouver.

CKSB-10-FM also produces a holiday morning program for western Canada - Les matins de l'Ouest. Le retour de l'ouest produced by Alberta's CHFA-FM, replaces regional drive programming on Première outlets in western Canada.

== Rebroadcasters ==
Rebroadcasters of CKSB-10-FM
| City of licence | Identifier | Frequency | Power | Class | RECNet | CRTC Decision | Notes |
|---|---|---|---|---|---|---|---|
| Sainte Rose du Lac | CKSB-1-FM | 92.9 FM | 5,420 watts | A | Query | 2003-508 | 51°4′14.88″N 99°31′18.12″W |
| St. Lazare | CKSB-2 | 860 AM | 40 watts | LP | Query | | 50°26′48.12″N 101°17′34.80″W |
| The Pas | CKSB-3-FM | 93.7 FM | 79 watts | A1 | Query | | 53°50′8.88″N 101°15′10.80″W |
| Flin Flon | CKSB-4-FM | 92.7 FM | 351 watts | A | Query | 2019-276 | 54°47′16.08″N 101°50′38.40″W |
| Thompson | CKSB-5-FM | 99.9 FM | 55 watts | A1 | Query | | 55°43′46.92″N 97°51′51.84″W |
| Dryden, Ontario | CKSB-6-FM | 102.7 FM | 1,290 watts | A | Query | | 49°47′0.96″N 92°48′25.92″W |
| Kenora, Ontario | CKSB-7-FM | 93.5 FM | 21,721 watts | B | Query | | 49°46′9.12″N 94°30′18″W |
| Brandon | CKSB-8-FM | 99.5 FM | 21,700 watts | C1 | Query | | 49°40′5.16″N 100°0′43.20″W |
| Fort Frances, Ontario | CKSB-9-FM | 89.1 FM | 12,170 watts | B1 | Query | | 48°38′21.84″N 93°43′14.88″W |
