= Gordon Sinclair Award =

Annual Canadian television award

- Awarded for: In recognition of excellence in broadcast journalism
- Country: Canada
- Presented by: Academy of Canadian Cinema & Television
- First award: 1972
- Currently held by: Hazel Mae (2025)
- Website: academy.ca/awards

The Gordon Sinclair Award is a Canadian journalism award, presented by the Academy of Canadian Cinema and Television for excellence in broadcast journalism. Originally presented as part of the ACTRA Awards, it was transferred to the new Gemini Awards in 1986. During the ACTRA era, the award was open to both radio and television journalists; when it was taken over by the Academy, it became a television-only award.

In the late 1990s, the award transitioned from a competitive award with a shortlist of nominees, which was presented to honour journalism work within the past year, into a lifetime achievement award whose winner was announced in advance of the annual award ceremony.

Since 2013, it has been presented as part of the Canadian Screen Awards.

The award is named in honour of television and radio commentator Gordon Sinclair.

A different Gordon Sinclair Award is also presented by Toronto Metropolitan University to graduate students in its journalism school, but has no connection to the Canadian Screen Awards.

== Winners ==
=== ACTRA Awards (1972-1986) ===
- 1972 - Pierre Berton
- 1973 - Max Ferguson
- 1975 - Jack Webster
- 1976 - Warner Troyer and Adrienne Clarkson
- 1977 - Judy LaMarsh
- 1978 - Linden MacIntyre
- 1979 - Barbara Frum
- 1980 - Ricki Katz and Susan Millican
- 1981 - Eric Malling
- 1982 - Stephen Lewis
- 1983 - Laurier LaPierre
- 1984 - Elizabeth Gray
- 1985 - Eric Malling and Hana Gartner
- 1986 - Roy Bonisteel

=== Gemini Awards (1986-2012) ===
- 1986 - Jim Reed and Eric Malling
- 1987 - Joe Schlesinger
- 1988 - no award presented
- 1989 - Patrick Watson
- 1990 - Peter Mansbridge
- 1991 - Pamela Wallin
- 1992 - Linden MacIntyre
- 1993 - Craig Oliver
- 1994 - Linden MacIntyre
- 1995 - Brian Stewart
- 1996 - Victor Malarek
- 1997 - Linden MacIntyre
- 1998 - Peter Mansbridge
- 1999 - David Studer
- 2000 - Ron Haggart
- 2001 - Bill Cunningham
- 2002 - Dennis McIntosh
- 2003 - Brian McKenna
- 2004 - Neil Docherty
- 2005 - David Halton
- 2006 - Hana Gartner
- 2007 - Tony Burman
- 2008 - Don Newman
- 2009 - no award presented
- 2010 - no award presented
- 2011 - Lloyd Robertson
- 2012 - Laurier LaPierre

=== Canadian Screen Awards (2013-present) ===
- 2013 - W5
- 2014 - Ric Esther Bienstock
- 2015 - Mark Starowicz
- 2016 - Simcha Jacobovici
- 2017 - Karyn Pugliese
- 2018 - no recipient
- 2019 - no recipient
- 2020 - Anton Koschany
- 2021 - no recipient
- 2022 - Rassi Nashalik
- 2023 - Lisa LaFlamme
- 2024 - Paul Workman
- 2025 - no recipient
- 2026 - Hazel Mae
