= Murray Parker (broadcaster) =

Canadian broadcaster

Murray Parker (born 1937) was a Canadian broadcaster who was with CBC Manitoba for many years as weather forecaster on 24Hours, and station announcer. He also co-hosted Noon Hour in the 1970s.

Murray started at CBWT in 1966, and prior to that at Winnipeg radio station CKRC.

In the mid-1980s he was host of the local cable-TV version of Reach for the Top on Videon Cable-TV.

He has also co-hosted several Children's Miracle Network Telethons in Manitoba.

CBC Manitoba announced on February 2, 2007, that Murray would return as weather person on the evening local newscast (24Hours?) starting Monday, February 19, 2007. However his return lasted only one season.
