= CKSB-FM =

Ici Musique station in Winnipeg

- Winnipeg, Manitoba; Canada
- Broadcast area: Winnipeg, Regina and Saskatoon
- Frequency: 89.9 MHz
- Branding: Ici Musique

Programming
- Format: Public Music
- Affiliations: Ici Musique

Ownership
- Owner: Canadian Broadcasting Corporation
- Sister stations: CBW, CBW-FM, CKSB-10-FM, CBWT-DT, CBWFT-DT

History
- First air date: December 23, 2001
- Call sign meaning: St. Boniface

Technical information
- Class: C1
- ERP: 61,000 watts
- HAAT: 223 metres (732 ft)

CKSB-FM (89.9 MHz) is a public radio station in Winnipeg, Manitoba, owned by the Canadian Broadcasting Corporation. It carries Radio-Canada's Ici Musique network, airing a mix of adult album alternative (AAA), classical music and other genres.

CKSB-FM has an effective radiated power of 61,000 watts, broadcasting from the Starbuck Communications Tower.

== History ==
On August 21, 2001, the CRTC approved the CBC's application to launch the new French language radio station. CKSB-FM signed on the air December 23, 2001.

== Transmitters ==
CKSB-FM also has rebroadcast transmitters in Saskatchewan:

Rebroadcasters of CKSB-FM
City of licence	Identifier	Frequency	Power	Class	RECNet	CRTC Decision	Notes
Regina	CKSB-FM-1	88.9 FM	100,000 watts	C1	Query	2002-125	50°28′58.08″N 104°30′21.60″W
Saskatoon	CKSB-FM-2	88.7 FM	100,000 watts	C1	Query	2002-125	52°10′27.84″N 106°26′6″W

Both rebroadcasters for Regina and Saskatoon were approved by the CRTC on April 30, 2002.

== See also ==
- CKSB-10-FM
- CBWFT-DT
