= CBW-FM =

CBC Music station in Winnipeg

- Winnipeg, Manitoba; Canada
- Broadcast area: Southern Manitoba
- Frequency: 98.3 MHz
- RDS: CBC MUSIC
- Branding: CBC Music

Programming
- Format: Adult contemporary/Public music

Ownership
- Owner: Canadian Broadcasting Corporation
- Sister stations: CBW, CKSB-10-FM, CKSB-FM, CBWT-DT, CBWFT-DT

History
- First air date: December 10, 1962
- Former call signs: CFMW-FM (1962–1965)
- Call sign meaning: Canadian Broadcasting Corporation Winnipeg

Technical information
- Class: C
- ERP: 160,000 watts
- HAAT: 223 metres (732 ft)

Links
- Website: CBC Manitoba

CBW-FM (98.3 MHz) is a public non-commercial radio station in Winnipeg, Manitoba, owned by the Canadian Broadcasting Corporation. The station airs the CBC Music Network, a mix of adult album alternative, classical music and other genres. Its studios are located on Portage Avenue in Downtown Winnipeg, while its transmitter is located on the Starbuck Communications Tower.

CBW-FM is one of the most powerful radio stations in Canada, with an effective radiated power (ERP) of 160,000 watts, while most FM stations run at 100,000 watts or less. (Winnipeg is also home to the most powerful station, CJKR-FM at 310,000 watts.)

== History ==
CBW-FM is Winnipeg's second FM station, signing on the air on December 10, 1962. It began as a commercial classical music station with the call sign CFMW-FM (Fine Music Winnipeg). At the time it had the strongest FM signal in all of Canada at 354,000 watts, giving it a range of 200 miles. It broadcast from a studio building at 4051 Pembina Hwy. in St. Norbert, although some programming came from CFAM in Altona.

The CBC purchased the station in 1965. CBW-FM joined the CBC Stereo network at its start on November 3, 1975.

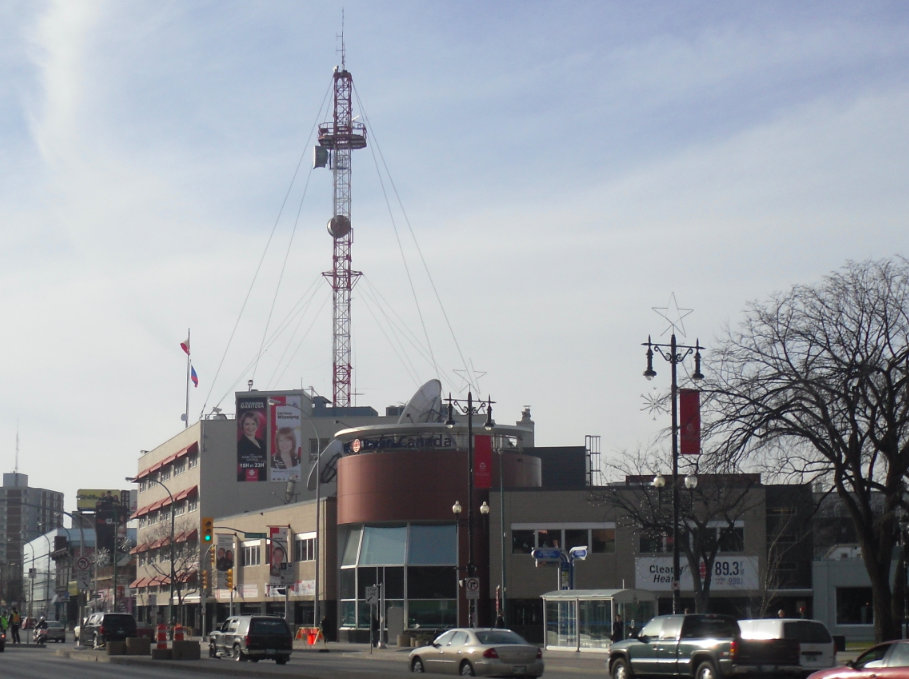
CBC Winnipeg Building, 541 Portage Ave.

Today, CBW-FM has its studios and offices at 541 Portage Avenue, along with its English-language sister stations CBW and CBWT-DT.

== Programming ==
CBW-FM was the originating station of the jazz program After Hours with Ross Porter, since 1993, but the program aired its final episode on March 16, 2007. Tonic, a similarly themed program hosted from Montreal by Katie Malloch on weeknights and from Calgary by Tim Tamashiro on weekends, debuted in its place on March 19.

== Transmitters ==
Rebroadcasters of CBW-FM
City of licence	Identifier	Frequency	Power	Class	RECNet	Notes
Brandon	CBWS-FM	92.7 FM	90,000 watts	C1	Query	49°40′5.16″N 100°0′43.20″W

An expansion of CBW is in the works for other regions of Manitoba. Future rebroadcasters are planned for Dauphin (106.1), Flin Flon (89.7), The Pas (100.3), and Thompson (90.7).
