= CKXA-FM =

Radio station in Brandon, Manitoba

Coordinates: 49°40′05″N 100°00′42″W

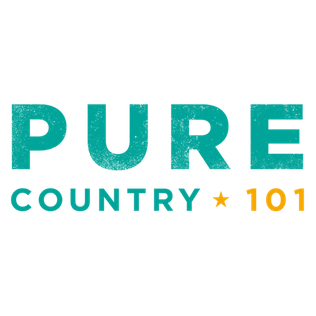
- Brandon, Manitoba; Canada
- Broadcast area: Westman Region
- Frequency: 101.1 MHz
- Branding: Pure Country 101

Programming
- Format: Country
- Affiliations: Premiere Networks; Winnipeg Jets Radio Network

Ownership
- Owner: Bell Media
- Sister stations: CKX-FM

History
- First air date: December 5, 1928
- Former call signs: CKX (1928–1999)
- Former frequencies: 1120 kHz (1928–1941); 1150 kHz (1941–1999)

Technical information
- Class: C
- ERP: 100,000 watts
- HAAT: 349.5 metres (1,147 ft)

Links
- Webcast: Listen Live
- Website: www.purecountry.ca/brandon.html

CKXA-FM (101.1 MHz) is a radio station in Brandon, Manitoba. Owned by Bell Media, it broadcasts a country format.

== History ==
The station went into operation on December 5, 1928, as CKX, and was owned and operated by the Manitoba Telephone System. It broadcast at 1120 AM until 1941, at which time it switched to 1150 kHz.

In 1947, the provincial government announced that it was leaving the radio business. The following year, CKX was purchased by a group of Brandon businessmen headed by John B. Craig, managing director of Western Manitoba Broadcasters.

The station was affiliated with the CBC's Dominion Network from 1944 until 1962 and then with the main CBC Radio network until 1978.

The station moved to FM in 1999. It added an A to its callsign when it moved to FM, as it already had a sister station using the callsign CKX-FM. In 2001, CKXA changed to a Top 40/CHR format under the name Hot 101, similar to owner Craig Broadcasting's CKMM-FM in Winnipeg.

In 2002, CKX and CKXA, along with two other Craig radio properties, were sold to Standard Radio. In 2005, CKXA returned to the country music format. In 2007, Astral Media acquired CKXA as part of its purchase of Standard Broadcasting. In 2013, Bell Media acquired Astral Media. It was known as 101.1 The Farm.

On May 28, 2019, the station rebranded as Pure Country 101 as part of a nationwide rebranding.

== Notable personalities ==
- Don McGowan, disc jockey (1957–1958).
