= CKX-FM =

Radio station in Brandon, Manitoba

Coordinates: 49°50′30″N 99°58′42″W

- Brandon, Manitoba; Canada
- Broadcast area: Westman Region
- Frequency: 96.1 MHz
- Branding: Bounce 96.1

Programming
- Format: Adult hits
- Affiliations: Bounce Radio

Ownership
- Owner: Bell Media; (Bell Media Radio G.P.)
- Sister stations: CKXA-FM

History
- First air date: December 16, 1963
- Call sign meaning: Derived from sister station CKX

Technical information
- Class: C
- ERP: 88,700 watts
- HAAT: 349.5 metres (1,147 ft)

Links
- Webcast: Listen Live
- Website: iheartradio.ca/bounce/brandon

CKX-FM (96.1 MHz) is a radio station in Brandon, Manitoba. Owned by Bell Media, it broadcasts an adult hits format branded as Bounce 96.1.

== History ==
The station started operation on December 16, 1963 as a sister station to CKX-AM. The station, with a power of 29,000 watts, was the first stereo FM station in Manitoba. In 1983, the station adopted the KX 96 and mainstream rock format, making 2008 their 25th year on air. As a mainstream rock station, KX 96 focused most of its airtime on classic rock or familiar music and features a somewhat limited collection of modern rock tracks.

In 1991, Western Manitoba Broadcasters, who formerly owned CKX-FM, CKX-AM and CKX-TV, changed its name to Craig Broadcast Systems Inc. Craig's radio operations in Brandon were sold to Standard Radio in 2002, along with two other Craig Media properties.

Ownership changed hands once again when on October 29, 2007, Astral Media took over all stations operating under Standard Broadcasting. It is now owned by Bell Media after Astral merged with the company in 2013.

On August 30, 2013, CKX-FM switched its format to adult hits and re-branded as 96.1 Bob FM.

On May 18, 2021, the station rebranded under Bell's national adult hits brand Bounce 96.1, with no change in format.
