= CBWT-DT =

Television station in Winnipeg

- Winnipeg, Manitoba; Canada
- Channels: Digital: 27 (UHF); Virtual: 6
- Branding: CBC Manitoba (general); CBC Winnipeg News (newscasts)

Programming
- Affiliations: 6.1: CBC Television

Ownership
- Owner: Canadian Broadcasting Corporation
- Sister stations: CBW, CBW-FM, CKSB-10-FM, CKSB-FM, CBWFT-DT

History
- First air date: May 31, 1954
- Former call signs: CBWT (1954–2011)
- Former channel numbers: Analogue: 4 (VHF, 1954–1958), 3 (VHF, 1958–1964), 6 (VHF, 1964–2011)
- Former affiliations: Paramount Television Network (secondary, 1954–1956)
- Call sign meaning: CBC Winnipeg Television

Technical information
- Licensing authority: CRTC
- ERP: 42 kW
- HAAT: 138.6 m (455 ft)
- Transmitter coordinates: 49°53′43″N 97°08′17″W

Links
- Website: CBC Manitoba

CBWT-DT (channel 6, cable 2) is a CBC Television station in Winnipeg, Manitoba, Canada. It has common ownership with Ici Radio-Canada Télé station CBWFT-DT (channel 3). The two stations share studios on Portage Avenue and Young Street in Downtown Winnipeg; CBWT-DT's transmitter is located near Red Coat Trail/Highway 2 in Macdonald.

== History ==
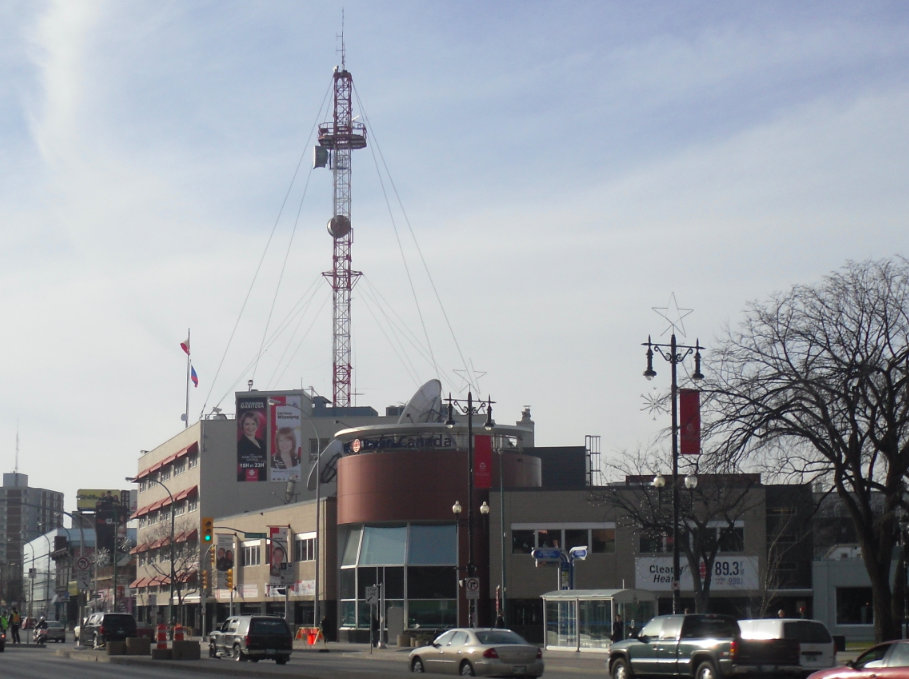
CBC Winnipeg Building at 541 Portage Avenue

Planning for CBWT started in November 1952, when the Government of Canada announced its intention of setting up a television station in Winnipeg. The station was announced by J. R. Finlay at a Cosmopolitan Club meeting at the Marlborough Hotel on September 16, 1953. At the time, the station was projected to become western Canada's first television station (before Vancouver's CBUT), but was delayed. There was an entry for CBWT in the 1953 MTS telephone book. In September 1953, CBC Winnipeg moved into a new 5,000 m^{2} (50,000 sq ft) facility at 541 Portage Avenue.

A few months later, on May 31, 1954, CBWT began as a bilingual station on channel 4 with an effective radiated power of 60,000 watts. In the same year KXJB-TV began broadcasting on channel 4 from Fargo, North Dakota, and there were concerns of interference between the two stations. CBWT's first equipment consisted of an RCA Victor TT10AL transmitter and a 60-metre (196 ft) six-section Super Turnstile Type TF-6AM antenna, located atop the station's roof.

One of CBWT's first large mobile production was Ice Revue, broadcast from the Winnipeg Winter Club in March 1956. However, the equipment was different and there were complains of television receivers becoming stuck in the vertical or horizontal hold when the mobile unit switched cameras. Older tube-television sets had a sync generator which was blamed for the reception problem.

On September 30, 1956, the station connected to the Trans-Canada Microwave Relay System, which allowed Winnipeggers to watch CBC Television programming on the same day it was broadcast in Toronto and Montreal. To celebrate this link, CBC Television produced a special one-hour program, Along the Tower Trail, the Winnipeg segment featured a view of the CPR's Marshalling Yards, the Saint Boniface Cathedral, a prairie harvest clip, and a musical piece sung by the Andrew Mynarski School choir. By late 1957, it was decided to move CBWT from channel 4 to channel 3. The changeover occurred in April 1958.

Eye-To-Eye was a weekly local current affairs program broadcast from 10:15 to 11 p.m. every Tuesday and was the predecessor to 24Hours. It debuted on October 20, 1959, and was similar in style to Close-Up on the national network. The first topics covered were: "The Slums of Winnipeg", "Civic Politics – A Sick Joke" and "Interview – Two Young Ladies". Eye-To-Eye was produced by Ken Black and Warner Troyer.

On April 24, 1960, the station became English-only, while French programming moved to the newly launched CBWFT. At the same time two video tape recorders, worth $75,000 each, were installed at the station to replace the kinescope system used previously. The local version of Reach for the Top debuted in 1962 and was hosted by Bill Guest, alternately by Ernie Nairn. The program ran until 1985.

On November 16, 1964, CBWT swapped channels with CBWFT and higher-powered transmitters were installed on a new 324-metre (1,064 ft) antenna mast near Starbuck, Manitoba. This enabled reception as far as 113 kilometres (70 mi) away, and improved reception in the towns of Portage la Prairie, Gimli, Carman, Winkler, Morden, Morris, Letellier, Emerson, Altona, and Dominion City. It continues to be the tallest free-standing structure in the province. The move to VHF channel 6 also permitted people in the coverage area to hear the English feed's audio on FM radios tuned to 87.7; this option was no longer available after the station shifted to digital and shut down the analogue transmitter.

There was a large National Association of Broadcast Employees and Technicians (NABET) strike throughout the CBC organization in the spring of 1981, and production of 24Hours was halted. Strike action began at 10:30 p.m. on May 3. Shortly after the Mulroney government came to power in 1984, they made major cuts to the CBC, and as a result, 86 staff members were let go at CBWT. A second round of major cuts in December 1990, had a negative effect on local production, especially on the resources of 24Hours.

On February 27, 1997, CBC Manitoba announced that it would update and expand its studio facilities by 2,700 square metres (29,063 sq ft) at a cost of $2.8 million. In 1998, CBC Manitoba's newsroom and studios were expanded into a new building, after essentially using portables and an abandoned church for many years. The new studio featured a window looking down onto Portage. It was one of the first CBC stations to transition to a new digital Betacam SX format. The first television broadcast from the new studio occurred on Monday, September 21, 1998.

Previous programs produced at CBWT include Fred Penner's Place, It's a Living, and Disclosure.

== Programming ==
CBWT is CBC Television's flagship station for the Central Time Zone, airing the main CBC schedule one hour after stations in the Eastern Time Zone. This differs from other Canadian television networks, whose Eastern and Central time zones stations air programs simultaneously.

Country Canada, CountryWide and a local edition of CBC News at Six (formerly the local segment of CBC News: Canada Now from 2000 to 2006 and 24Hours from 1970 to 2000) have been produced at CBWT. In addition, The National has an investigative unit based at the station.

=== Local programming ===
Country Canada was one of the longest-running programs in Canadian television history and is broadcast nationally. It began as Country Calendar in 1954. The program name was carried over to a new digital specialty channel called CBC Country Canada, which first launched in September 2001. Spotlight was one of CBWT's first news interview programs, which aired Monday through Saturdays between 7:15 and 7:30 p.m.

3's Company was a local program broadcast in the early 1960s, hosted by Mary Liz Bayer, Bill Guest, and Jose Poneira, and similar to Living Winnipeg. Bayer had become the host of her own show, The Mary Liz Show, one year earlier. The Medicine Show was a local production shown nationally from January 1980 to August 1982. Show Business, hosted by Tom McCulloch, and Ten O'Clock Live, a music program from a local bar, were produced by CBWT in 1981.

In Search of the Perfect Summer was a summertime series produced by Sean Sullivan and was co-hosted by Anne Harding and Laurie Mustard in the 1982 season. It was nominated Best Variety Program on Television in the 1982 Winnipeg Broadcast Awards. Mustard won Best Host/Interviewer for the series.

Between 1983 and 1986, Mustard hosted the Winnipeg edition of a Sunday morning program for kids called Switchback. By 1989, the Winnipeg program was cancelled and amalgamated with the CBKT Regina edition of Switchback, contributing a portion of the program content.

The end of regional non-news programming came in 2000–01, when Breakaway, a program profiling Manitoba towns which had aired since June 1987, was canceled in a round of CBC budget cuts. Co-host Sandi Coleman went on to host the morning program on CBC Radio One Yukon.

CBWT broadcast Living Winnipeg, another regional non-news program, weekdays from January 15, 2007, until the program was cancelled across the network in 2009.

=== News operation ===
As of March 2024, CBWT-DT broadcasts 5 hours of locally produced newscasts each week. CBWT airs a 60-minute supper hour newscast from 6 to 7 p.m. CBC Radio One's Information Radio program is also simulcast on CBC Television weekdays from 6 to 7 a.m. CBWT-DT used to produce a 10-minute summary at 11 p.m. on weeknights, however as of March 2024, the station now airs a rebroadcast of the 6 p.m. newscast at 11 p.m.

The first big news story CBWT covered was on June 8, 1954, about one week after the station opened, when the Time Building at 333 Portage Avenue caught fire. The Time Building was across from the Eaton's building.

At one time, Western Manitoba Broadcasters (a subsidiary of Craig Media) and CBC Manitoba had an agreement where the Dauphin retransmitter (CBWST 8) would carry a local newscast in place of the Winnipeg news, under the branding of Intermountain Television (IMTV). The program was called IMTV The Report and was broadcast at 5:30 p.m. in the 1980s and 1990s.

News at Noon was CBWT's half-hour news program that ran until January 1985, when the network program Midday took the timeslot. It had been previously called Noon Hour, which was a 60-minute program. Midday ran until 2000, but local news programming has not returned during the noon hour. 24Hours, an hour-long news and current affairs program, had run from 1970 to 2000.

On January 5, 2024, longtime CBC Manitoba meteorologist John Sauder signed off for the final time. Sauder had been with the CBC for 16 years, joining in 2008 from rival broadcaster CKY-TV.

On April 5, 2024, weeknight anchor Janet Stewart announced she would be leaving the television broadcast for a year to host Radio Noon on CBC Radio One. In May 2024, the corporation announced that Brittany Greenslade would host the 6 p.m. broadcast for one year.

==== Notable current on-air staff ====
- Bartley Kives – reporter
- Janet Stewart – weeknight anchor (currently hosting CBC Radio One's Radio Noon)

==== Notable former on-air staff ====
- Maurice Burchell – CBWT's first news reader
- Sandy Cushin – former host of Country Canada (1975–2000)
- Garth Dawley – former 24Hours newsreader (1970–1983)
- Arvel Gray – former 24Hours weather forecaster
- Liz Grogan – co-hosted Noon Hour in the 1970s
- Bill Guest – former station announcer, host of Reach for the Top quiz show, co-hosted Tandem (early 1960s)
- John Harvard – former 24Hours interviewer
- Peter Herrndorf – worked for CBWT (1965–?)
- Peter Jordan – former host of It's a Living and "W six" segment on CBC News Winnipeg
- Peter Mansbridge – former anchor of The National, began his career at CBWT.
- Terry Matte – former 24Hours reporter
- Mike McCourt – former 24Hours interviewer (1986–1991)
- Tom McCulloch – hosted Show Business (early 1980s)
- Bill Morgan, original producer of 24Hours
- Sheila North – former host of CBC Winnipeg Late Night, left for unsuccessful run for Assembly of Manitoba Chiefs
- Scott Oake – former 24Hours and CBC Sports anchor and reporter
- Fred Penner – children's entertainer
- Anne Petrie – former host of 24Hours Late Night (1985–1989)
- Aarti Pole – CBC News Winnipeg news reporter and substitute anchor
- Üstün Reinart – former 24Hours interviewer/reporter
- John Robertson – former 24Hours interviewer (1977–1981)
- Lloyd Robertson – began his television career here (1954–1957)
- Ed Russenholt – CBWT's first weather person on Spotlight
- Murray Parker (1966–1992 and 2007–2008) longtime staff announcer, Let's Go!, Reach for the Top, host of Around Town (late 1960s), CBC Sports (anchored nightly national round-up during '76 Olympics), and best known as the 24Hours weatherman until his retirement in 1992.
- Diana Swain – former 24Hours news anchor and interviewer (1995–2000)
- Rosemary Thompson – former 24Hours reporter
- Warner Troyer – former Eye-To-Eye producer
- Judy Waytiuk – former 24Hours reporter
- Jack Wells – former sports anchor of Spotlight
- Bob Willson – original host of Spotlight

==== Notable former on-air staff of IMTV ====
- Darren Dutchyshen – former IMTV The Report sports anchor (late 1980s)

== Technical information ==
Subchannel of CBWT-DT
Subchannel	Res.	Short name	Programming
6.1	720p	CBWT-DT	CBC Television

=== Analogue-to-digital conversion ===
CBWT switched from analogue to digital television broadcasting on December 9, 2011, from its Winnipeg transmitter atop the Richardson Building. There had been several delays in the switchover, due to issues involving antenna erection. CBWT's former analog transmitter was located southwest of Winnipeg at 49°53′43″N 97°08′17″W. CBWT's digital signal operates on UHF channel 27, using virtual channel 6.

=== Former transmitters ===
CBWT operated approximately 50 analogue television rebroadcasters throughout the province of Manitoba (e.g. The Pas and Thompson), the Central Time Zone portion of Northern Ontario (e.g. Kenora), and portions of Saskatchewan. Due to federal funding reductions to the CBC, in April 2012, the CBC responded with substantial budget cuts, which included shutting down CBC's and Radio-Canada's remaining analogue transmitters on July 31, 2012. None of CBC or Radio-Canada's rebroadcasters were converted to digital.

CBWT began extending its signal using various methods, beginning in June 1962 with CBWBT in Flin Flon and CBWBT-1 in The Pas using kinescope recordings from CBWT. Later on, CBTA in Lynn Lake became part of the Frontier Coverage Package in September 1967. From 1968 onwards, CBWT used the province-wide microwave system to provide live television signals.

At one time, CBWAT in Kenora offered separate local news programming from CBWT, which was discontinued in 1979–80 when CJBN-TV went on the air.

==== Manitoba ====
City of licence	Call sign	Channel	ERP (W)	Notes
Baldy Mountain (Dauphin)	CBWST	8 (VHF)	120,000	Began operation on June 19, 1960
Churchill	CHFC-TV	8 (VHF)	8.9	Previously a CBC North transmitter until 1981; began operation as CHGH-TV on May 17, 1965
Cross Lake	CBWNT	12 (VHF)	8.9	
Easterville	CBWHT-2	11 (VHF)	8.9	
Fairford	CBWGT-2	11 (VHF)	2,000	
Fisher Branch	CBWGT	10 (VHF)	27,400	Formerly CBWT-1; began operation January 31, 1967
Flin Flon	CBWBT	10 (VHF)	68	Began operation June 8, 1962
Gillam	CBWLT	8 (VHF)	5	Began operation October 3, 1969
Gods Lake Narrows	CBWXT	13 (VHF)	2,400	
Grand Rapids	CBWHT	8 (VHF)	5	Began operation November 29, 1968
Jackhead	CBWGT-15	5 (VHF)	3,400	Began operation June 7, 1977
Lac de Bonnet	CBWT-2	4 (VHF)	8,400	Began operation May 27, 1968
Leaf Rapids	CBWQT	13 (VHF)	260	
Little Grand Rapids	CBWZT	9 (VHF)	230	
Lynn Lake	CBWRT	8 (VHF)	8.9	Began operation as CBTA-TV on September 18, 1967
Mafeking	CBWYT	2 (VHF)	4,000	
Manigotagan	CBWGT-3	22 (UHF)	151	
McCusker Lake	CBWUT	10 (VHF)	240	
Moose Lake	CBWIT-1	9 (VHF)	8.9	
Nelson House	CBWPT	11 (VHF)	8.9	
Norway House	CBWOT	9 (VHF)	8.9	
Oxford House	CBWVT	8 (VHF)	8.9	
Pickle Lake	CBWDT-6	7 (VHF)	5	
Pikangikum	CBWDT-5	9 (VHF)	5	
Piney	CBWT-3	29 (UHF)	25,000	
Pukatawagan	CBWBT-1	11 (VHF)	8.9	
Red Lake	CBWET	10 (VHF)	570	
Snow Lake	CBWKT	8 (VHF)	5	Began operation on February 22, 1969
South Indian Lake	CBWQT-1	10 (VHF)	8.9	
The Pas	CBWIT	7 (VHF)	288	Formerly CBWBT-1; began operation June 13, 1962
Thompson	CBWTT	7 (VHF)	296	Began operation April 1, 1965
Wabowden	CBWMT	10 (VHF)	8.9	
Wassagomach	CBWWT	9 (VHF)	3,400	

==== Northwest Ontario ====
City of licence	Call sign	Channel	ERP (W)	Notes
Atikokan	CBWCT-1	7 (VHF)	2,800	Began broadcasting November 3, 1964
Big Trout Lake	CBWT-1	13 (VHF)	10	
Dryden	CBWDT	9 (VHF)	8,900	Began operation March 26, 1963
Ear Falls, Ontario	CBWJT	13 (VHF)	10	
Fort Frances	CBWCT	5 (VHF)	50,500	Began broadcasting July 30, 1964; also served border regions of north-central Minnesota, including International Falls
Ignace	CBWDT-2	13 (VHF)	8.9	
Kenora	CBWAT	8 (VHF)	8,000	Began broadcasting December 5, 1959
Osnaburgh	CBWDT-4	13 (VHF)	8.9	
Red Lake	CBWET	10 (VHF)	570	Began broadcasting on July 27, 1954
Sandy Lake	CBWDT-7	10 (VHF)	10	
Savant Lake	CBWDT-3	8 (VHF)	8.9	
Sioux Narrows	CBWAT-1	4 (VHF)	8.9	

==== Northeast Saskatchewan ====
City of licence	Call sign	Channel	ERP (W)
Cumberland House	CBWIT-2	9 (VHF)	8.9
Island Falls	CBWBT-2	7 (VHF)	330
Pelican Narrows	CBWBT-3	5 (VHF)	13.2
