= CBW (AM) =

CBC Radio One station in Manitoba, Canada

- Winnipeg, Manitoba; Canada
- Broadcast area: Southern Manitoba
- Frequency: 990 kHz / 89.3 MHz
- RDS: CBC RADIO 1-
- Branding: CBC Radio One

Programming
- Format: Public radio - News/Talk

Ownership
- Owner: Canadian Broadcasting Corporation
- Sister stations: CBW-FM, CBWT-DT, CKSB-10-FM, CKSB-FM, CBWFT-DT

History
- First air date: March 13, 1923; 103 years ago
- Former call signs: CKY (1923-1949)
- Call sign meaning: Canadian Broadcasting Corporation Winnipeg

Technical information
- Class: A (clear-channel)
- Power: 50,000 watts day; 46,000 watts night
- Transmitter coordinates: 49°50′10″N 97°30′46″W
- Repeater: See list

Links
- Website: CBC.ca/Manitoba

CBW is the call sign of the CBC Radio One station in Winnipeg, Manitoba, Canada. The station broadcasts at 990 kHz. CBW is a non-commercial Class A Clear-channel station reserved for Canada under the North American Regional Broadcasting Agreement (NARBA) allocations.

CBW's studios are located on Portage Avenue (Winnipeg Route 85) in Downtown Winnipeg, while its transmitters are located near Beaudry Provincial Park in Springstein.

Due to the station's transmitter power and Manitoba's mostly flat land (with near-perfect ground conductivity), CBW 990 reaches almost all of southern Manitoba during the day and much of the middle portion of North America at night. The station is simulcast on CBW-1-FM at 89.3 MHz. The FM transmitter is atop the Richardson building, in downtown Winnipeg.

== History ==
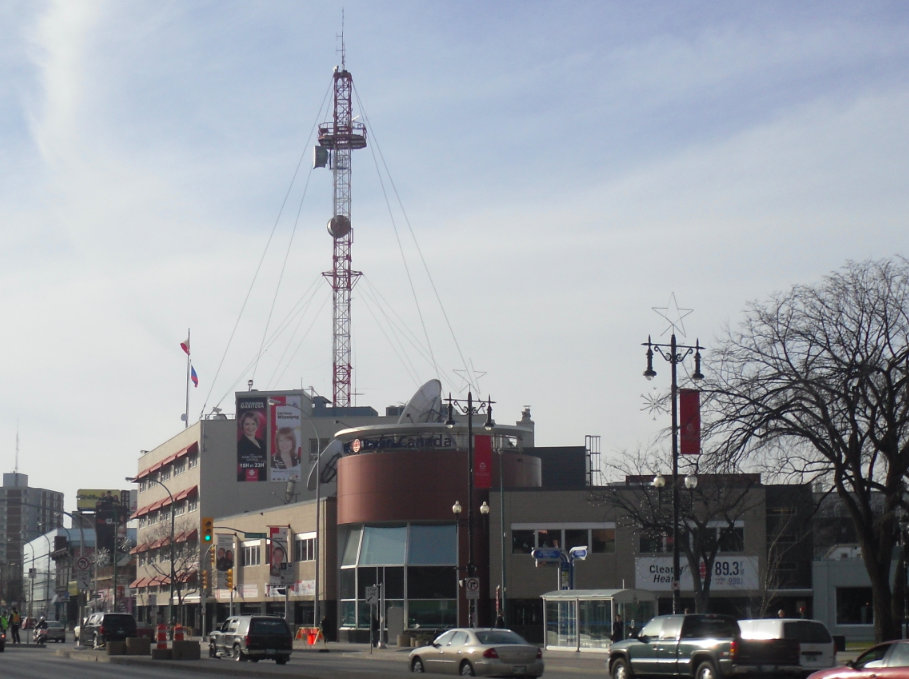
CBC Winnipeg Building, 541 Portage Ave.

An early demonstration of radio by Lee de Forest took place in Winnipeg in April 1910, with extensive amateur and experimental interest after that date. Regularly scheduled broadcasting did not begin until the spring of 1922, when Lynn Salton established a private station with the call sign CKZC. Both Winnipeg daily newspapers developed their own radio stations in 1922, notably providing coverage of the 1922 Provincial election. However, the stations were found to be expensive to operate. In January 1923, the newspapers agreed to get out of the broadcasting business in favor of the government-owned station.

The station first signed on March 13, 1923 as CKY, owned and operated by the Manitoba Telephone System, with a transmitter power of 500 watts at a frequency of 665 kHz. It became a partial affiliate of the Canadian Radio Broadcasting Commission in 1933, and was purchased outright by the CBC in 1948. The station adopted its current call sign a few months after the CBC purchase, and the CKY call sign was reassigned to a new commercial radio station in 1949.

CBW was part of the Trans-Canada Network, which was the main CBC radio network, while CKRC carried programming from the Dominion Network between January 1, 1944 and 1962.

The transmitter was originally located in Carman. On February 3, 1952, a small plane with 3 passengers struck the Carman tower, due to heavy fog. None of the passengers survived. Three tower workers were killed when the tower collapsed during efforts to replace a missing guy wire.

On July 29, 1992, CBW was authorized to decrease its night-time power from 50,000 watts to 46,000 watts and relocate the transmitter from Carman to a new site near Springstein. On October 15, 1993, CBW began broadcasting from the new site, which was 30 miles closer to Winnipeg than the old site.

CBW moved from the 3rd floor of the Telephone Building on Portage Avenue East to its current location on Portage Avenue, broadcasting from the new location for the first time on July 5, 1953. The opening officially occurred on September 25, 1953. Over the next week, the station held open house tours of the station. The building cost $1 million to construct and was state of the art at the time.

Today, CBW shares this same location with CBW-FM and CBWT-DT.

On March 16, 2006, the Canadian Radio-television and Telecommunications Commission (CRTC) approved an application by the CBC for a "nested" FM rebroadcaster in Winnipeg as a simulcast of CBW. The station had long been plagued by poor coverage in portions of Winnipeg itself, and the FM repeater was intended to improve reception in these areas. CBW-1-FM 89.3 operates from a transmitter atop MTS Bell Place Main, and has an effective radiated power of 2,800 watts.

The call sign CBW was previously used by the CBC Radio station in Windsor, Ontario in 1937-38 until it was shut down. When it was revived in 1950, the Windsor CBC outlet became CBE.

== Local programming ==
CBW's local programs are Information Radio in the morning, Radio Noon and Up to Speed in the afternoon; The Weekend Morning Show runs on Saturdays and Sundays, and the arts and culture show Manitoba Scene at 5:00 p.m. on Saturdays in addition to North Country programming weekdays at 7:30 a.m. and 12 p.m. CT.

CBWK-FM Thompson and its rebroadcasters also air programming from the CBC Manitoba studio in Winnipeg (with the exception of "Information Radio").

== Transmitters ==
Rebroadcasters of CBW
City of licence	Identifier	Frequency	RECNet	CRTC Decision	Notes
Winnipeg	CBW-1-FM	89.3 FM	Query	2006-84	49°53′43.08″N 97°8′17.16″W
Brandon	CBWV-FM	97.9 FM	Query		49°40′5.16″N 100°0′43.20″W
Dauphin-Baldy Mountain	CBWW-FM	105.3 FM	Query		51°28′14.16″N 100°43′12″W
Fisher Branch	CBWX-FM	95.7 FM	Query		51°4′51.96″N 97°38′52.08″W
Manigotagan	CBWA-FM	101.3 FM	Query		51°8′30.12″N 96°15′54″W
Jackhead	CBWY-FM	92.7 FM	Query		51°53′20.04″N 97°19′0.84″W
Fairford	CBWZ-FM	104.3 FM	Query		51°42′43.92″N 98°35′3.12″W

== CBW personalities ==
=== Current ===
- Rosanna Deerchild, host Unreserved, Saturdays 5:00 PM Manitoba Sundays 7:00 PM National
- Marcy Markusa, host Information Radio
- Marjorie Dowhos, host Radio Noon
- Faith Fundal, host Up to Speed
- Nadia Kidwai, host Weekend Morning Show
- Shannah-Lee Vidal, traffic & community reporter
- Heather Wells, news anchor weekday mornings
- Matt Humphrey, news reader
- Riley Laychuk, weather specialist, CBC evening news
- Brittany Greenslade, TV News anchor
- Karen Pauls, National reporter
- Meaghan Ketcheson, reporter
- Susan Magas, reporter
- Bartley Kives, City Hall reporter Formerly of the Winnipeg Free Press
- Bruce Ladan, director/host, Weekend Morning Show

=== Former ===
- Bill Guest - host Information Radio, Reach for the Top
- Donald Benham - hosted Questionnaire in the (1990s)
- Garth Dawley - co-hosted Information Radio (1960s) (Deceased June 1, 2020)
- Eric Friesen - co-hosted Radio Noon, Up to Now (1970s)
- Lesley Hughes - co-hosted Information Radio (1980s)
- Tom McCulloch - Information Radio news anchor (1970s)
- Doug McIlraith - co-hosted Radio Noon (1970s)
- Gren Marsh - co-hosted Up to Now (1970s)
- Agatha Moir - Information Radio (1980s), regular fill-in host for all radio shows
- Gary Moir - news/sports
- Lionel Moore - co-hosted Radio Noon (1970s)
- Maureen Pendergast - co-hosted Information Radio (1990s)
- Jim Rae - co-hosted Radio Noon (1970s)
- Kerän Sanders - host of The Afternoon Edition (1989–1997) & The Weekend Morning Show (2009–2012)
- Jack Turnbull - Information Radio news anchor (1970s)
- Bob Willson - co-hosted 1950 flood coverage
- Roger Currie
- Peter Duck (Moved to Windsor)
- Ismaila Alfa (now host of CBC Toronto's Fresh Air)
- Terry Mcleod (retired host of Information Radio and Weekend Morning Show)
- Megan Benedictson (now with CKY-DT)
- Sean Kavanagh (now with Manitoba government)
- Marianne Klowak (resigned as of 2023 citing pandemic reporting)
- Larry Updike (former host, Up to Speed)
- Sarah Penton (now hosting Radio West in Kelowna, BC)
- Leslie McLaren - news reader/reporter
- Marilyn Maki, retired
- Katie Nicholson (now with The National)
- Emily Brass, reporter (now hosting Information Morning in Saint John, NB)

== CRTC licensing ==
- CRTC Decision 1999-515 - New multi-channel antenna serving Brandon, Manitoba
- CRTC Decision 2006-84 - FM rebroadcast transmitters

== See also ==
- CBW-FM
- CBWT-DT
- History of broadcasting in Canada
