= CBWFT-DT =

Television station in Winnipeg

- Winnipeg, Manitoba; Canada
- Channels: Digital: 32 (UHF); Virtual: 3
- Branding: ICI Manitoba

Programming
- Affiliations: 3.1: Ici Radio-Canada Télé

Ownership
- Owner: Société Radio-Canada
- Sister stations: CBWT-DT

History
- First air date: April 24, 1960
- Former call signs: CBWFT (1960–2011)
- Former channel numbers: Analog: 6 (VHF, 1960–1964), 3 (VHF, 1964–2011); Digital: 51 (UHF, 2011–2020)
- Call sign meaning: CBC Winnipeg Français Télévision

Technical information
- Licensing authority: CRTC
- ERP: 9.5 kW
- HAAT: 135.1 m (443 ft)
- Transmitter coordinates: 49°53′43″N 97°8′17″W

Links
- Website: ICI Manitoba

CBWFT-DT (channel 3) is an Ici Radio-Canada Télé station in Winnipeg, Manitoba, Canada, serving the province's Franco-Manitoban population. It has common ownership with CBC Television station CBWT-DT (channel 6). The two stations share studios on Portage Avenue and Young Street in Downtown Winnipeg; CBWFT-DT's transmitter is located atop the Richardson Building.

== History ==
The CBC announced on February 17, 1959, that they would appear before the BBG (predecessor to the CRTC) in Ottawa on March 18 to apply for a license to extend Radio-Canada's television signal into the Winnipeg area.

CBWFT logo from 1977

CBWFT first signed on at 3 p.m. on April 24, 1960, using channel 6 with an ERP of 2,800 watts. At the same time two VTRs, worth $75,000 each were installed at the station. It was the first francophone television station west of Ontario. Its opening broadcast was a ceremony held at the Notre Dame Auditorium in St. Boniface. Dignitaries included in attendance were Lieutenant-Governor Errick Willis; Premier Duff Roblin; CBC President Alphonse Ouimet; Marcel Ouimet, general manager of Radio-Canada; J. R. Finlay, CBC Prairie Region Director; and Leo Remillard, CBWFT's program director.

At first, CBWFT's broadcast day ran between 6 and 12 hours, with a longer programming day on weekends. Over the years, this was extended to encompass most of the day. Initially, Radio-Canada's microwave link did not reach as far as Winnipeg. Instead, videotapes and films were "bicycled" from Montreal and delayed by one week, except for news and live events like La Soirée du hockey.

CBWFT logo from 1986 to 1992

On November 15, 1964, it swapped frequencies with CBWT and a higher-powered transmitter was installed at the new site near Starbuck. From 1964 till the early 1980s, it referred to itself simply as "CBWFT canal 3 Winnipeg". During the early 1980s, CBWFT was known as "CBWFT 3/10", signifying its position on Channel 3, Cable 10 in Winnipeg. On January 1, 1986, it became known as "Radio-Canada Manitoba".

By October 31, 1966, CBWFT was connected to the Radio-Canada microwave signal, allowing the live feed of Le Téléjournal at 6 p.m. Prior to this the newscast consisted of Radio-Canada's radio news with locally inserted images. Several months after the first Anik A satellite was launched in 1972, CBWFT switched to the satellite feed of Radio-Canada and dropped the microwave feed, except to distribute its signal within its coverage area, Manitoba and Northwestern Ontario, and part of Saskatchewan. In 1976, a rebroadcaster of CBWFT programming in Regina became CBKFT. In 1985, CBKFT was issued a separate license to broadcast its own Ce Soir regional news program.

== News operation ==
In 2005, the long-running Ce Soir news program was renamed to Le Téléjournal, which is the same name of the French national news program on Radio-Canada. The Téléjournal local edition is normally 30 minutes in length; however, the Wednesday edition is 60 minutes. The program is also rebroadcast at 11 p.m.

As of 2023, the Monday to Thursday bulletins are presented by Godlove Kamwa and Friday to Sunday by Cédrick Noufele.

== Technical information ==
=== Subchannel ===
Subchannel of CBWFT-DT
Subchannel	Res.	Short name	Programming
3.1	720p	CBWFTDT	Ici Radio-Canada Télé

=== Analog-to-digital conversion ===
CBWFT switched from analog to digital television broadcasting on December 9, 2011, from its Winnipeg transmitter atop the Richardson Building, after several delays, due to an "unforeseen delay that is outside of the Corporation's control", involving antenna erection. CBWFT's digital signal operates on UHF channel 32, using virtual channel 3.

=== Transmitters ===
CBWFT operated 11 analog television retransmitters in Manitoba (e.g. Brandon) and Northwestern Ontario (in the parts of that region which fall in the Central Time Zone, e.g. Kenora). Due to federal funding reductions to the CBC, in April 2012, the CBC responded with substantial budget cuts, which included shutting down CBC's and Radio-Canada's remaining analog transmitters on July 31, 2012. None of CBC or Radio-Canada's television rebroadcasters were converted to digital.

==== Manitoba ====
City of license	Callsign	Channel
Brandon	CBWFT-10	21 (UHF)
Flin Flon	CBWFT-2	3 (VHF)
Oak Lake	CBWFT-12	32 (UHF)
Pine Falls	CBWFT-6	11 (VHF)
St. Lazare	CBWFT-3	13 (VHF)
Sainte Rose du Lac	CBWFT-4	3 (VHF)
The Pas	CBWFT-1	6 (VHF)
Thompson	CBWFT-5	5 (VHF)

==== Northwest Ontario ====
City of license	Callsign	Channel
Dryden	CBWFT-9	6 (VHF)
Fort Frances	CBWFT-11	15 (UHF)
Kenora	CBWFT-7	2 (VHF)
