= Media in Waterloo Region =

This is a list of media in the Regional Municipality of Waterloo, Ontario, including Kitchener, Waterloo, Cambridge and the surrounding area.

== Radio ==
| Frequency | Call sign | Branding | Format | Owner | City of license | Notes |
|---|---|---|---|---|---|---|
| AM 570 | CKGL | CityNews 570 | News/Talk | Rogers Radio | Kitchener | Defunct as of July 7, 2026. |
| FM 88.3 | CJIQ-FM | 88.3 CJIQ | Campus radio, Modern rock | Conestoga College | Kitchener | |
| FM 89.1 | CBLA-FM-2 | CBC Radio One | Public radio, talk radio | Canadian Broadcasting Corporation | Paris | Local programming since 2013 from studios in Kitchener. |
| FM 89.9 | CJBC-FM-2 | Ici Musique | Public radio, variety | Canadian Broadcasting Corporation | Paris | Rebroadcaster of CJBC-FM (Toronto) |
| FM 90.7 | CBL-FM-2 | CBC Music | Public radio, Adult contemporary | Canadian Broadcasting Corporation | Paris | Rebroadcaster of CBL-FM (Toronto) |
| FM 91.5 | CKBT-FM | 91.5 The Beat | Contemporary hit radio | Corus Entertainment | Kitchener | |
| FM 93.7 | CJTW-FM | Faith FM 93.7 | Christian radio | Sound of Faith Broadcasting | Kitchener | |
| FM 96.7 | CHYM-FM | 96.7 CHYM | Adult contemporary | Rogers Radio | Kitchener | |
| FM 98.5 | CKWR-FM | 98.5 CKWR | Community radio, adult standards | Wired World, Inc. | Kitchener | |
| FM 99.5 | CFCA-FM | 99.5 Virgin Radio | Contemporary hit radio | Bell Media Radio | Kitchener | |
| FM 102.7 | CKMS-FM | 102.7 Radio Waterloo | Community radio | Radio Waterloo, Inc. | Waterloo | Former campus radio station of the University of Waterloo |
| FM 105.3 | CKKW-FM | Bounce 105.3 | Classic hits | Bell Media Radio | Kitchener | |
| FM 106.7 | CIKZ-FM | Country 106.7 | Country music | Rogers Radio | Kitchener | |
| FM 107.5 | CJDV-FM | 107.5 Dave FM | Mainstream rock | Corus Entertainment | Kitchener | |

Waterloo Region is also within the coverage area of the clear-channel station CJBC (AM 860), the Toronto outlet of Ici Radio-Canada Première.

Stations from neighbouring cities such as Hamilton, Guelph, London, Brantford and Toronto can also be received in some areas of the Waterloo Region.

== Television ==
The only broadcast television station based in Waterloo Region is CTV owned-and-operated station CKCO-DT, which is branded on-air as CTV Kitchener. It is located in Kitchener and is owned by Bell Media. The region is also served by Rogers TV, a community channel based in Kitchener available only to Rogers Cable subscribers providing local talk shows, coverage of special events, and local hockey games.

Television stations and rebroadcasters based in the vicinity of Waterloo Region are:

| OTA virtual channel (PSIP) | OTA channel | Rogers Cable | Call Sign | Network | Notes |
|---|---|---|---|---|---|
| 6.1 | 17 (UHF) | 3 | CIII-DT | Global | Transmitted from Paris; rebroadcaster of CIII-DT-41 (Toronto) |
| 13.1 | 13 (VHF) | 12 | CKCO-DT | CTV | |
| 28.1 | 28 (UHF) | 2 | CICO-DT-28 | TVOntario | Transmitted from Paris; rebroadcaster of CICA-DT (Toronto) |
| – | – | 20 | – | Rogers TV | Community channel for Rogers Cable subscribers |

Waterloo Region previously received CBC Television and Ici Radio-Canada Télé from rebroadcasters of Toronto's CBLT-DT and CBLFT-DT, respectively, before the rebroadcasters were shut down by the CBC in 2012 due to budget cuts. Stations from adjacent markets belonging to CBC, Radio-Canada, Citytv, CTV 2, and other networks / systems that are not readily available over the air remain available on the basic service of most pay television subscriptions. The incumbent cable television provider in Waterloo Region is Rogers Cable.

== Print ==
=== Newspapers ===
The daily newspaper serving Waterloo Region is Metroland Media Group's Waterloo Region Record. In addition to the regional newspaper, Metroland also publishes local newspapers for the individual communities in the region. In Kitchener, it has published Kitchener Post since June 2011. Equivalent local newspapers exist for Waterloo and Cambridge in the form of Waterloo Chronicle and Cambridge Times, respectively. Prior to 2004, a separate local newspaper, the Cambridge Reporter, was published, but has since been merged with the Cambridge Times.

The regional townships are also served by their own local newspapers. The Observer is aimed towards readers in Elmira, Woolwich, and Wellesley, and New Hamburg Independent for New Hamburg and Wilmot. The Ayr News is aimed towards readers in Ayr and the surrounding township of North Dumfries.

=== Magazines ===
- A\J: Alternatives Journal, circulation about 5,000, based at the University of Waterloo since 1984, is a bi-monthly national Canadian magazine exploring environmental science, issues, policy and debate. It is the official publication of the Environmental Studies Association of Canada.
- Chinese Canadian Voice, the first Chinese community monthly magazine based in Cambridge, covering community news and events in Southwestern Ontario, published since 2013
- Exchange Magazine for Business, circulation 20,000, is an 8 time a year business magazine and Monday to Friday online business daily that has been publishing in the Waterloo Region since 1983.
- Stare City Guide, a locally owned publication based in Waterloo that promotes noteworthy independent businesses in the Kitchener-Waterloo area, published since 2010.
- Visitor Guide, circulation 100,000, is a 3 time a year tourist magazine that has been published in Waterloo Region since 1978.
- Grand magazine, published by Metroland Media Group and delivered to upscale suburban neighbourhoods.
- The Holistic Parent, a natural health and wellness magazine for families in the Waterloo Region and Wellington County.
