= CBC Toronto =

CBC Toronto refers to:

- CBLA-FM, CBC Radio One on 99.1 FM
- CBL-FM, CBC Radio 2 on 94.1 FM
- CBLT-DT, CBC Television on channel 5

SRC Toronto refers to:

- CJBC, Première Chaîne on 860 AM
- CJBC-FM, Espace musique on 90.3 FM
- CBLFT-DT, Ici Radio-Canada Télé on channel 25

See also:

- Canadian Broadcasting Centre, the main CBC/Radio-Canada premises in Toronto
