= Metro Morning =

CBC Radio One Program

- Other names: Tomorrow Is Here (1973-74)
- Running time: 5:30 am–8:30 am
- Country of origin: Canada
- Language: English
- Home station: CBLA-FM
- Hosted by: Chris Glover
- Recording studio: Canadian Broadcasting Centre
- Original release: April 2, 1973
- Website: cbc.ca/metromorning

Metro Morning is CBC Radio One's local morning program in Toronto, airing on CBLA-FM. The program airs from 5:30 a.m. to 8:30 a.m. weekday mornings, and has frequently been Toronto's highest-rated radio program in its timeslot.

Metro Morning does not air on most of CBLA's rebroadcast transmitters outside of Toronto, which air the separate program Ontario Morning instead. However Metro Morning was broadcast on the Paris, Ontario transmitter CBLA-FM-2 to serve Waterloo Region and the westernmost parts of the Greater Toronto Area, until the start of that region's local morning programming, Morning Edition, on March 11, 2013.

== History ==
Metro Morning premiered in 1973 with the name Tomorrow Is Here. It replaced I'm Here Till 9 which had been hosted by Alex Trebek from 1971 until the end of 1972 when it was decided to replace it with a show that had a harder news format. George Rich hosted the morning show between Trebek's departure at the end of 1972 and the launch of Tomorrow Is Here on April 2, 1973.

Previously, CBC's morning show had been Toast and Jamboree, hosted by Bruce Smith, from 1948 until 1971.

Tomorrow Is Here was renamed Metro Morning in 1974. The program's first host was Bruce Rogers, who was succeeded by Harry Brown in 1975. Brown won an ACTRA Award for Best Public Affairs Broadcaster in 1976 for his work on the program.

For its first two decades, the program was broadcast from CBC Radio's former Cabbagetown studio at 509 Parliament Street, which had previously been a theatre. During this era, the show was famous for Tuffy, the station's "watchcat", who would be referred to regularly on air and even appeared on station merchandising. The show moved, along with all of the station's operations, to the Canadian Broadcasting Centre in 1992.

Joe Côté became host of the program in 1979, and stayed with the program until 1992 as its longest-serving host as of that time. He was succeeded by Matt Maychak, who left the program in 1995; Maychak was replaced by Andy Barrie, the longest-serving host in the show's history.

After Barrie retired from the program in 2010 he was succeeded by Matt Galloway, who had served for several years as host of the station's afternoon show Here and Now. Galloway's final day as host of Metro Morning was on December 6, 2019, following which he took over as host of the network's national morning news show The Current on January 6, 2020. The program was helmed after Galloway's departure by guest hosts including Farrah Merali, Piya Chattopadhyay, Ismaila Alfa, Jill Dempsey and David Common until Alfa was named the permanent host on July 7, 2020. He officially assumed the role on August 24, 2020.

Prior to being named host of Metro Morning, Alfa was the host of Up to Speed, the network's afternoon program on CBW in Winnipeg, Manitoba, and has been active as a hip hop musician, most notably participating in the 2008 Record of the Week Club project. In March 2023, he announced that he was leaving the program, remaining with the CBC but transferring to become host of the weekend morning program Fresh Air for personal reasons. The program was hosted by various guest hosts for the next several months, although Chattopadhyay was the consistent guest host in May and June due to the importance of the 2023 Toronto mayoral by-election as a subject of coverage on the program.

The program announced in October 4, 2023 that Common would be the new permanent host starting October 16, 2023. Dempsey, the program's primary regular newsreader, also frequently fills in as guest host when the host is absent.

Common left the program in January 2026 to become host of CBC Morning Live on CBC News Network. Guest hosts have included Dempsey and CBC journalists Angie Seth, Anis Heydari, Stephanie Skenderis and Chris Glover, who was named the permanent host of the programme effective May 21, 2026.

== Hosts ==
- Bruce Rogers (April 2, 1973 – 1975)
- Harry Brown (1975 – 1977)
- David Schatzky (1977 – 1979)
- Joe Coté (1979 – 1992)
- Matt Maychak (1992 – 1995)
- Andy Barrie (September 5, 1995 – February 25, 2010)
- Matt Galloway (March 1, 2010 – December 6, 2019)
- guest hosts (December 9, 2019 – August 21, 2020)
- Ismaila Alfa (August 24, 2020 – March 10, 2023)
- guest hosts (March 13, 2023 – October 13, 2023)
- David Common (October 16, 2023 – January 16, 2026)
- guest hosts (January 20, 2026 – May 20, 2026)
- Chris Glover (May 21, 2026 – present)
