= CJBC =

CJBC may refer to:

- CJBC (AM), a radio station (860 AM) licensed to Toronto, Ontario, Canada
- CJBC-FM, a radio station (90.3 FM) licensed to Toronto, Ontario, Canada
- Chief Justice of British Columbia, the Chief Justice of the British Columbia Court of Appeal
