= Podcast Playlist =

CBC Radio One program

- Genre: Podcast Curation
- Running time: 54 minutes
- Country of origin: Canada
- Language(s): English
- Syndicates: CBC Radio One, Public Radio Exchange
- Hosted by: Sean Rameswaram (May - November 2015); Matt Galloway (November 2015 - 2020); Lindsay Michael (2015 - 2020); Nana aba Duncan (2020); Elamin Abdelmahmoud (2020 - 2021); Leah-Simone Bowen (2021 - 2024)
- Produced by: Kate Evans, Julian Uzielli, Kelsey Cueva
- Original release: 2015 – 2024
- Audio format: Stereo
- Website: Official website

Podcast Playlist is a Canadian radio program and podcast, which airs weekly on CBC Radio One. It's currently hosted by Leah-Simone Bowen. Podcast Playlist was the first and longest running podcast curation show. It often explores a particular theme in each episode through curated excerpts from podcasts. The show frequently includes special guest curators and interviews. Some featured guests include: Glynn Washington, Rainn Wilson, Anna Sale, Nicole Byer, Nate DiMeo, Nick Quah, Phoebe Judge, Roman Mars, Sean Rameswaram, Jamie Loftus, Dan Savage, W. Kamau Bell, Elaine Lui, Adam Conover, Hrishikesh Hirway, Dylan Marron, Avery Trufelman, Sam Sanders, Lauren Ober, Helen Zaltzman, Aisha Tyler, David Suzuki, Scaachi Koul, Gaby Dunn, Latif Nasser, Mara Wilson, Max Kerman and more.

The program debuted in May 2015 as a short-run summer series, and was subsequently extended as part of Radio One's permanent regular season schedule in September. The program was originally cohosted by Lindsay Michael and Sean Rameswaram, a Canadian radio producer and podcaster currently based in New York City, where he was a producer for Studio 360 and the host of its spinoff podcast Sideshow. Rameswaram was previously heard on CBC Radio as a guest host of Q in early 2015, and was one of the five finalists for the permanent new host of the program before Shad's selection was announced in March.

Rameswaram left the show in November 2015, and was succeeded by Matt Galloway. After Galloway was named host of The Current while Michael was concurrently on maternity leave, the show was hosted for several months by Nana aba Duncan, until Elamin Abdelmahmoud joined as the new host in September 2020.

In September 2021 Leah-Simone Bowen joined as the permanent host. Bowen also co-hosts the CBC podcast The Secret Life of Canada.
