= CBC London =

CBC London refers to:

- CBCL-FM, CBC Radio One on 93.5 FM
- CBLN-TV, CBC Television on channel 40, rebroadcasts CBLT

SRC London refers to:

- CJBC-4-FM, Première Chaîne on 99.3 FM, rebroadcasts CJBC
- CBLFT-9, Télévision de Radio-Canada on channel 53, rebroadcasts CBLFT
