= Laura Lynch =

Canadian journalist

Laura Lynch is a Canadian television and radio journalist for CBC News, who hosts CBC Radio's weekly show What on Earth. Previously, she was a frequent guest host of CBC Radio's daily morning news program The Current.

After studying law at the University of Victoria and journalism at Carleton University, she began her career with the CBC as a legal affairs reporter covering stories in the Department of Justice and the Supreme Court of Canada. She won the Law Society of British Columbia's award for Excellence in Legal Journalism, and was nominated for a Jack Webster Award, for her reporting on the Supreme Court case R v O'Connor. She received the Martin Wise Goodman Nieman Fellowship the same year, and spent a year studying human rights at Harvard University.

She was subsequently a foreign correspondent based in Washington, D.C., and London, as well as travelling to report from various international locations including Afghanistan, Pakistan, Israel, Saudi Arabia, Zimbabwe, and Syria, before returning to Canada as a national affairs reporter in Vancouver.

In addition to her appearances as a guest host of The Current, she was the program's regular interim host in 2019, between the retirement of Anna Maria Tremonti and the debut of new host Matt Galloway in January 2020. She is currently the host of What on Earth, a weekly CBC Radio show on environmental issues.

Laura Lynch announced her retirement from the CBC on June 26, 2026.
