= Matthew Kang =

- Born: Matthew Kang; Ottawa, Ontario
- Education: University of Toronto
- Occupation: Television Journalist
- Notable credit(s): CTV News Kitchener; CBC News; Forbes Magazine

Matthew Kang is a Canadian-American journalist and video producer.

== Career ==
=== Deutsche Welle ===
Kang began his career at Deutsche Welle as a radio anchor and reporter in Bonn, Germany, where he reported on various world news events focusing on Germany and the European Union.

=== CTV ===
Kang joined CTV's Kitchener affiliate CKCO-DT as a general assignment reporter, he also reported for various CTV News Platforms including BNN, CTV News Channel and CTV National News. During his time there, he landed various high-profile interviews which included actor, Martin Sheen, Olympic athlete Clara Hughes and former CTV National News Anchor Lloyd Robertson.

=== CBC ===
Kang joined CBC News in 2013, he served as a local reporter for CBC Radio One Kitchener-Waterloo's affiliate CBLA FM. He covered stories on new product launches by BlackBerry, he recently covered the live Toronto launch of the Blackberry Passport and the launch of its new app 'Blackberry Blend'.

Kang has also covered the release of the Blackberry Classic.

=== Forbes Magazine ===
Kang joined Forbes Magazine in January 2016, based in San Francisco, California, he primarily covered stories on the technology industry as a video producer. He left in 2024 to join the media team at Y Combinator.

== Awards ==
Kang was awarded with a RTDNA Canada (Adrienne Clarkson Award - Diversity) in 2012 for his story on the challenges local police services face in attracting minorities, women and members of the LGBT community to joining their services as recruits.
