= Andy Barrie =

American Canadian radio personality

Andy Barrie CM
- Born: January 30, 1945 (age 81); Baltimore, Maryland, United States
- Education: Dartmouth College
- Occupation: Radio host
- Years active: 1964-2010
- Known for: Host of Metro Morning on CBLA-FM (1995–2010)
- Spouse: Mary Cone Barrie (m. 1970; died 2009)
- Children: 1

Andy Barrie, CM (born January 30, 1945) is an American Canadian radio personality most known for his work at Toronto radio stations, first at CFRB and later as host of Metro Morning on CBLA-FM from 1995 until his retirement on March 1, 2010.

== Early life ==
Born in Baltimore, Maryland, Barrie moved with his family to Yonkers, New York in 1952, where he attended public schools, going on to major in theater at Dartmouth College in Hanover, New Hampshire. Barrie first got involved with radio while a student at Dartmouth, and after graduation he began a career in radio: WCCC-FM in Hartford, Connecticut, WAYE in Baltimore and WASH-FM, then a Metromedia station in Washington, DC.

Given Conscientious Objector status by his local draft board during the Vietnam War, Barrie trained as a combat medic. In 1969, he received orders to be shipped to Vietnam. A conversation with his brother, a career officer who had just returned from two years there, confirmed Barrie's decision to desert and leave the U.S. for Canada. He later received a general discharge from the United States Army, became a Canadian citizen, and is free to travel to the U.S.

== Career in radio ==
Barrie was introduced to CJAD in Montreal, and when one of the station's long-time commentators resigned in protest during the October Crisis of 1970, Barrie was named as his replacement. In 1977, he moved to Toronto and a job at CFRB, where his commentaries won him an ACTRA award. He also worked briefly as an anchor and reporter for the Global Television Network.

In 1995, he was invited to join CBC Radio as the host of CBLA-FM's morning drive-time show, Metro Morning, in Toronto, Ontario, the talk and current affairs program that became the top-rated morning radio show in Toronto.

On June 29, 2007, Barrie revealed to his listeners that he had been diagnosed with early-stage Parkinson's disease. Barrie said he intended to continue as a broadcaster for at least another three years. On February 1, 2010, he announced his retirement from Metro Morning. Barrie's last day as host was Thursday, February 25, 2010. He was succeeded by Matt Galloway.

June 16, 2010, Barrie was awarded an Honorary Doctor of Laws degree by Toronto's York University.

On December 30, 2012, it was announced that Barrie was admitted to the Order of Canada for his achievements in Canadian broadcasting, and for his advocacy on behalf of those living with Parkinson's disease.

== Personal life ==
Andy Barrie was married in 1970 to Dr. Mary Cone Barrie, who retired in 2005 as the director of the School of Continuing Studies at the University of Toronto. Their daughter Jessie also has a doctorate in educational leadership and is the head of Bosque School, an independent school for students in grades 6–12, in Albuquerque, New Mexico.

Mary Cone Barrie died on February 18, 2009. Barrie took a leave of absence from the CBC from November 2008 to March 2009 to care for her during her illness.
