= Exclaim! =

Canadian music and entertainment publisher

- General manager: Alex Hudson
- Features editor: Kaelen Bell
- Online editor: Allie Gregory
- Print magazine editor: Calum Singerland
- Categories: Music; film; comedy; gaming
- Frequency: Monthly
- Circulation: 103,000
- Publisher: Ian Danzig
- Founder: Ian Danzig
- Founded: 1991
- First issue: April 1992; 34 years ago
- Company: 1059434 Ontario Inc.
- Country: Canada
- Based in: Toronto, Ontario, Canada
- Language: English
- Website: exclaim.ca
- ISSN: 1207-6600
- OCLC: 1144404847

Exclaim! is a music and entertainment publisher based in Toronto, Canada, which features coverage of new music across all genres with a special focus on Canadian and emerging artists. The monthly Exclaim! print magazine publishes seven issues per year, distributing over 103,000 copies to over 2,600 locations across Canada.

In addition to music, the magazine also covers film and comedy.

== History ==
Exclaim! began as a discussion among campus and community radio programmers at Ryerson's CKLN-FM in 1991. It was started by then-CKLN programmer Ian Danzig, together with other programmers and Toronto musicians. The goal of the publication was to support great Canadian music that was otherwise going unheralded. The group worked through 1991 to produce their first issue in April 1992, with monthly issues being produced since. Ian Danzig has been the publisher of the magazine since its start.

The magazine had no official name for its first year of operations, with only the !☆@# logo appearing on the cover, and introduced the name Exclaim! after Danzig realized that its growth and appeal to advertisers were being limited by a reader tendency to refer to it as Fuck.

The magazine is distributed across Canada as a free publication to campuses, community radio stations, bars, concert halls, record stores, cinemas, libraries, coffee shops, convenience stores and street vending boxes. It is also available with a home mail delivery subscription.

In 1999 Exclaim magazine became the host for Earshot Radio Charts, the national music chart based on airplay reports from campus and community radio stations, headed by the National Campus and Community Radio Association.

Danzig has attributed the magazine's survival in part to the fact that the internet ushered in an era of "free culture" in the late 1990s, meaning that the magazine never had to change its existing business model or alienate readers by introducing paywalls.

In 2023, The Ubyssey, the student newspaper of the University of British Columbia, parodied Exclaim! with a year-end spoof issue titled Explain!

== Website ==
The Exclaim! website is updated daily with the latest in music news, reviews, interviews, premieres, and feature stories, reaching over 675,000 unique visitors each month. There are also a number of recurring content series, including the monthly Eh! List Spotify playlist, New Faves emerging artists, the Exclaim! Questionnaire, Music School, Canadian Cannabis Heroes coverage and more.

In addition to music, Exclaim! covers major film festivals, such as the Toronto International Film Festival (TIFF), the Sundance Film Festival, Hot Docs Documentary Film Festival, and the Toronto After Dark Film Festival, and publishing interviews with a number of high-profile directors and movie stars. Its comedy section, similarly, focuses on profiles and interviews with established and up-and-coming stand-up comedians. The magazine's website also has contests where readers can enter for a chance to win various music, film and apparel prizes.

== Contributors ==
Many notable writers have worked for Exclaim! over the years, including Canadian radio personality Matt Galloway, Canadian punk chronicler and new media personality Sam Sutherland, hip-hop scribe and CBC Music producer Del Cowie, published author Andrea Warner, Canadian editor at The FADER Anupa Mistry, filmmaker Bruce LaBruce, and award-winning DJ and author Denise Benson.
