= What on Earth (Canadian radio show) =

What on Earth is a Canadian news radio program focusing on environmental issues, broadcast on CBC Radio One. It was hosted by Laura Lynch until her retirement in 2026. Since September 2026, the host is Johanna Wagstaffe.

It began as a summer 2020 replacement series, and it was continued as a regular season series.
