= Matt Galloway =

Canadian radio personality (born 1970)

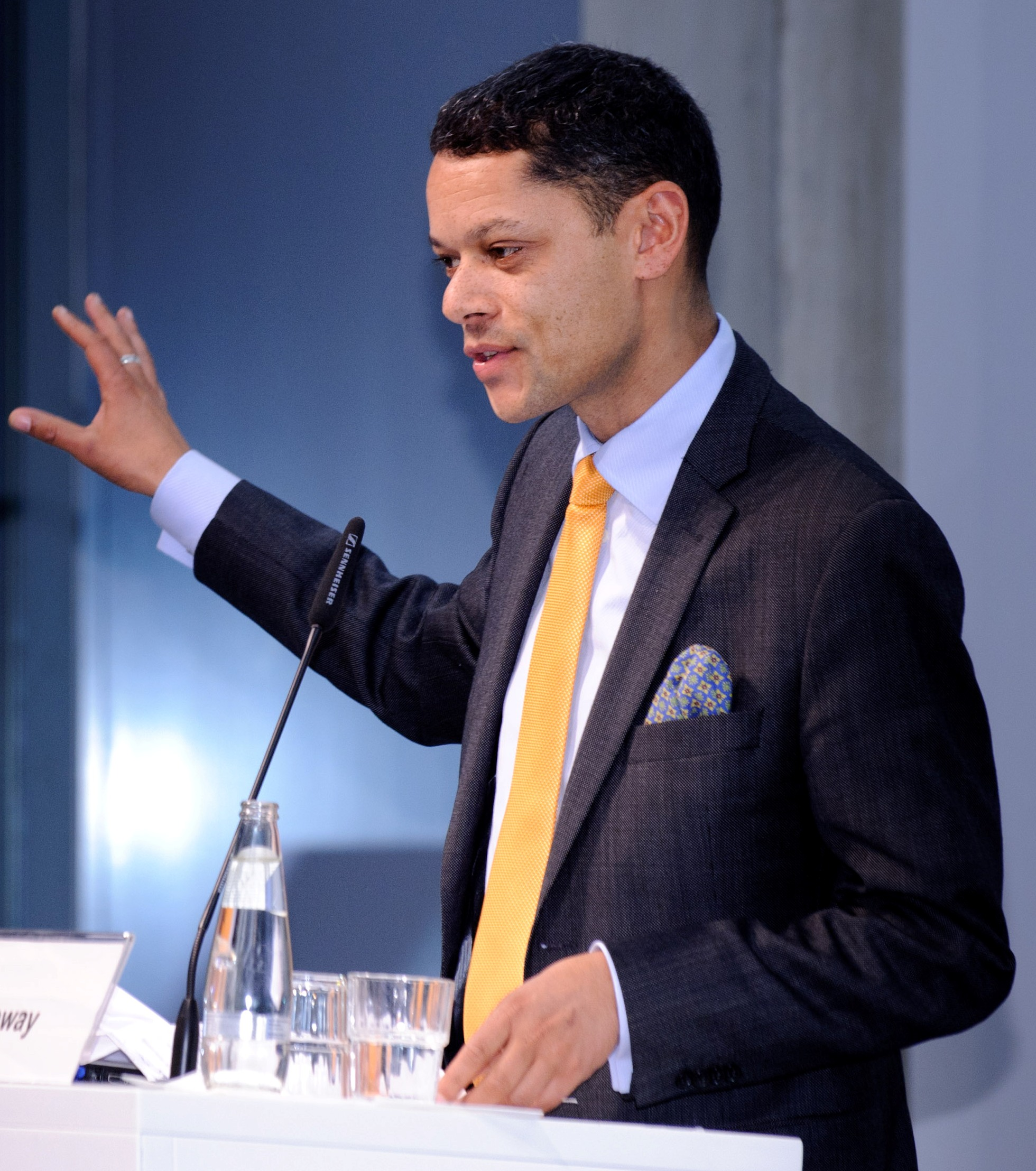
- Galloway in 2011
- Born: 1970 (age 55–56); Newmarket, Ontario, Canada
- Occupation: CBC Radio broadcaster
- Known for: The Current, Metro Morning

Matt Galloway (born 1970) is a Canadian radio personality, who debuted in January 2020 as the host of The Current on CBC Radio One. Previously, he was the host of Metro Morning on the network's Toronto station CBLA-FM from 2010 to 2019. Galloway succeeded Andy Barrie as host of Metro Morning effective March 1, 2010. Galloway has also been heard nationally as a host of Canada Live and Podcast Playlist, and as an occasional guest host of The Current prior to his selection as the program's permanent host.

== Early life and education ==
Galloway was born in Newmarket, Ontario to a European-Canadian mother and an African-American father, and raised in Kimberley, Ontario. He is a 1994 graduate of York University in Toronto.

== Career ==
Galloway took over as the new permanent host of The Current on January 6, 2020, succeeding Anna Maria Tremonti to become the national current affairs programme's second permanent host. Galloway's final day as host of Metro Morning was on December 6, 2019.

From 2004 through February 2010 Galloway hosted Here and Now, CBLA's local afternoon program.

Before he became a CBC Radio host he wrote for Toronto alternative weekly NOW, worked as music director for campus radio station CHRY-FM, and was a freelance producer on Brave New Waves.

== Personal life ==
Galloway is an avid cyclist and lives in Toronto with his wife and two daughters.
