= Lorne Saxberg =

Canadian television journalist

- Born: August 6, 1958; Thunder Bay, Ontario
- Died: May 6, 2006 (aged 47); Phuket, Thailand
- Occupations: journalist, broadcast news anchor

Lorne Saxberg (August 6, 1958 – May 6, 2006) was a Canadian broadcast journalist for CBC Radio and CBC Newsworld. Saxberg was born in Thunder Bay, Ontario and first joined the CBC's radio arm. As host of Ontario Morning in the late 1980s, he was known for his keen mind, calm demeanour, and melodious voice. "He had a full, rich voice not often heard in modern radio," said Canadian freelance broadcaster James Careless, who worked with Saxberg at Ontario Morning. "He was truly a class act both on and off the air."

Saxberg left Ontario Morning to become one of the original CBC Newsworld TV anchors from that network's start in 1989. Saxberg served with the Canadian Broadcasting Corporation for 27 years and was popular with news audiences. He was also an active volunteer with the Canadian Media Guild.

Saxberg received an Edward R. Murrow Award for his work on the 2005 coverage of the 60th anniversary of the atomic bombing of Hiroshima. Saxberg took a leave of absence from CBC Newsworld to work at Japan's NHK public broadcaster as a trainer and announcer from 2004. He died in a snorkelling accident in Phuket, Thailand, where he was on vacation. He was 47 years old.

Ken Becker, a Newsworld producer who worked with Saxberg, said: "He was the consummate pro and an exceptional journalist...When he was in the anchor chair, you knew you could throw Lorne any story – from the outbreak of war to the birth of a panda at the zoo—and he'd deliver it to the viewer with exactly the right tone."

"He brought to every story a vast knowledge on nearly every subject, a reporter's curiosity and an appreciation of fine writing," Becker said. Once, following a report on the Russian precursor of Naked News, Saxberg began to remove his tie as he ended the newscast.

== Personal life ==
Saxberg often returned home to visit his family, who bought a general store in the small town of Silver Islet in 1987. When home, Saxberg often worked in the store and as the summer resort town's harbourmaster.

In Toronto, however, Saxberg—who was openly gay—was known for being playfully flamboyant with his wardrobe, often wearing a snakeskin jacket and leather pants when socializing with friends at bars in the Church and Wellesley area.
