= Elamin Abdelmahmoud =

Sudanese Canadian writer, culture and politics commentator

- Abdelmahmoud in 2026
- Born: March 10, 1988 (age 38)
- Education: Queen's University
- Occupations: Writer and commentator
- Children: 1
- Website: Official Instagram

Elamin Abdelmahmoud (born March 10, 1988) is a Canadian writer, culture and politics commentator, and broadcaster based in Toronto, Ontario. He is best known as a culture writer for BuzzFeed and as a CBC Radio podcast and network radio host.

In November 2022 the CBC announced that Abdelmahmoud would debut on January 30, 2023, as the host of Commotion, a daily pop culture magazine show which airs after Q weekday mornings.

== Early life and education ==
Abdelmahmoud was born in Sudan and emigrated to Canada at the age of 12, settling in Kingston, Ontario. He studied philosophy and gender studies at Queen's University, graduating in 2011. As a student at Queen's he wrote for the Queen’s Journal and worked at CFRC-FM, the campus radio station. In 2018, Abdelmahmoud was awarded the One to Watch Award by the Queen's Alumni Association.

== Career ==
Abdelmahmoud's career began as a production assistant at the CBC. He began working as researcher for George Stroumboulopoulos Tonight in 2012 before joining The National as a researcher and editorial assistant. He left the CBC to join TVO, where he worked as a social for TVO's The Agenda. Abdelmahmoud joined BuzzFeed in 2015 and took over writing BuzzFeed's morning newsletter in 2018. His inspirational newsletter signoffs gained widespread popularity, resulting in merchandise featuring his well wishes to readers. Abdelmahmoud has been a panelist on The National and is a regular guest on other CBC programs. In 2019 Abdelmahmoud began co-hosting the political podcast Party Lines with Canadian political journalist Rosemary Barton. He began hosting Pop Chat in 2020. The same year he joined the Podcast Playlist as the program's new host.

As a long-form writer, Abdelmahouhd has written about culture and politics for publications including Chatelaine, Maclean's and The Guardian. He is also known for writing about race as it pertains to music and social life including interviews with Yola, Rhiannon Giddens, and Jason Isbell about racism in country music and the whiteness of the Canadian cottage industry.

Abdelmahmoud's first book Son of Elsewhere: A Memoir in Pieces was published by Random House in 2022. The book draws on his experience identifying as Arab as a child only to be defined as Black after arriving in Canada.

== Personal life ==
Abdelmahmoud lives in Toronto with his wife, Emily, and their daughter Amna Eliot.
