= CKWR-FM =

Radio station in Waterloo, Ontario

Coordinates: 43°27′0″N 80°36′7″W

FM 985 CKWR
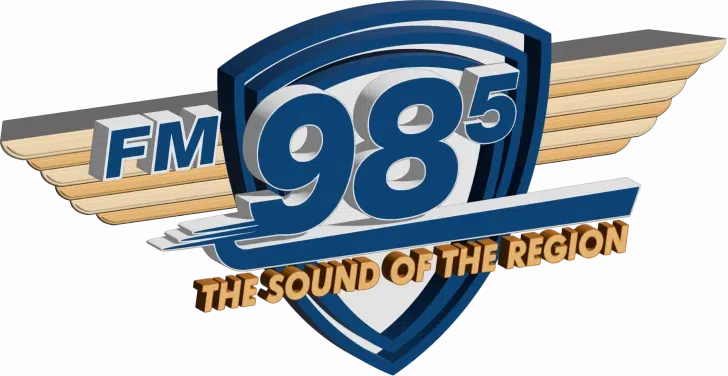
- Waterloo, Ontario; Canada
- Broadcast area: Waterloo Region
- Frequency: 98.5 MHz
- Branding: FM 985

Programming
- Format: Classic Rock/Multicultural

Ownership
- Owner: Wired World Inc.

History
- First air date: 1973
- Former frequencies: 98.7 MHz (1973–1997)
- Call sign meaning: Kitchener Waterloo Radio

Technical information
- Licensing authority: CRTC
- Class: B
- ERP: 2,500 watts
- HAAT: 180 metres (590 ft)

Links
- Website: ckwr.com

FM 985 CKWR is a Canadian radio station, broadcasting a local news, classic rock, and multicultural format at 98.5 FM in Waterloo, Ontario, Ontario. The station has broadcast since 1973.

The studio is located on 100 Frobisher Drive, Unit 7 in Waterloo, Ontario while its transmitter is located on Wilby Road near Wilmot Line in Wilmot.

== History ==
FM 985 CKWR is a not-for-profit radio station that serves the communities of Kitchener, Waterloo, Cambridge and Guelph. It was the first licensed community radio station in Canada, receiving a license in 1973.

On July 21, 1997, the station received approval from the Canadian Radio-television and Telecommunications Commission (CRTC) to change CKWR-FM's frequency from 98.7 MHz to 98.5 MHz and increase the effective radiated power from 1,430 watts to 2,400 watts. The change was to eliminate interference received from co-channel station CBCB-FM 98.7 MHz in Owen Sound.

Programming weekdays is Classic Rock with local news and community events announcements. Evenings air specialty music programs, and weekends are multicultural.FM985 is the broadcasting home of the Kitchener Rangers Junior A OHL hockey team, airing both home and away games. FM985 is the only locally owned radio station in Waterloo Region.
