= Bruce Rogers (broadcaster) =

Canadian broadcaster, author and political candidate (1933–2026)

- Born: Bruce Alfred Rogers; August 14, 1933; Toronto, Ontario, Canada
- Died: July 20, 2026 (aged 92); St. Albert, Alberta, Canada
- Education: Ryerson Institute of Technology
- Occupations: Broadcast journalist; author; educator; political candidate
- Employers: Canadian Broadcasting Corporation; TVOntario; CFRB
- Known for: Original anchor of The World at Six; first host of Metro Morning
- Notable work: You Can Say That Again!

Bruce Alfred Rogers (August 14, 1933 – July 20, 2026) was a Canadian broadcast journalist, author, educator and political candidate. A longtime broadcaster with the Canadian Broadcasting Corporation (CBC), he was one of the original anchors of The World at Six and the first host of CBC Radio Toronto's Metro Morning. He later worked for TVOntario and CFRB and taught broadcasting at Ryerson University.

== Early career ==
Born in Toronto, Rogers studied at the Ryerson Institute of Technology, where he was a student in Radio and Television Arts in the 1950s. During his time at Ryerson, he served as chief announcer of CJRT-FM. He later studied journalism at Ryerson.

By 1962, Rogers was working for the CBC. During the network's coverage of the 1962 Canadian federal election, he reported election results from the Toronto area.

== Broadcasting career ==
Rogers worked extensively in both radio and television for the CBC during the 1960s, 1970s and 1980s. On October 31, 1966, Rogers and John O'Leary anchored the inaugural broadcast of The World at Six, the CBC's national evening radio newscast.

In 1967, Rogers hosted the CBC Radio program 1967 And All That, which examined aspects of Canadian life during the country's Centennial year. In December 1969, he and Lyal Brown co-hosted a CBC Radio retrospective on the events of the 1960s.

On April 2, 1973, Rogers became the host of CBC Radio Toronto's morning program, succeeding George Rich. The program was renamed Metro Morning during Rogers's tenure. He remained its host until 1975, when he was succeeded by Harry Brown.

He also hosted CBC Radio's Radio Noon. His other CBC radio work included Sunday Magazine and numerous hourly news bulletins.

On television, Rogers hosted CBLT's The Rogers Report and worked on CBC television newscasts.

Rogers subsequently worked for TVOntario, including as host of the financial programs Money$worth and Money$ense. His broadcasting career also included work for the Knowledge Network and Global Television Network.

After leaving the CBC, Rogers worked as a newsreader at Toronto radio station CFRB where he hosted Prime Time News for the station and produced, wrote, and anchored The World This Week for CFRB's affiliates radio syndication service, Standard Broadcast News. He retired from CFRB and Standard on May 31, 1998.

He also taught broadcast journalism at Ryerson University, including in its journalism and Radio and Television Arts programs.

== Political activity ==
Rogers was a candidate for the federal New Democratic Party on four occasions. He first ran in the Toronto riding of Parkdale in the 1968 Canadian federal election, finishing second with 8,983 votes.

More than three decades later, Rogers returned to electoral politics as the NDP candidate in Oshawa in the 2000 Canadian federal election, receiving 4,203 votes. He subsequently ran in Clarington—Scugog—Uxbridge in the 2004 Canadian federal election and Durham in the 2006 Canadian federal election.

== Writing ==
Rogers wrote You Can Say That Again!: A Fun Approach to Sounding Better When You Open Your Mouth to Speak (ISBN 0-88882-208-1), a book about speech and oral communication published by Dundurn Press in 1999.

== Death ==
Rogers died in St. Albert, Alberta on July 20, 2026, at the age of 92.
