= CBLA-FM-2 =

CBC Radio One station in Paris, Ontario

Coordinates: 43°15′38.88″N 80°26′38.04″W

- Paris, Ontario; Canada
- Broadcast area: Waterloo Region
- Frequency: 89.1 MHz (FM)

Programming
- Language: English
- Format: Public Radio
- Network: CBC Radio One

Ownership
- Owner: Canadian Broadcasting Corporation

History
- First air date: 1999 (rebroadcaster of CBLA-FM; March 11, 2013 (start of local programming); April 26, 2013 (officially licensed station)
- Call sign meaning: Canadian Broadcasting Corporation Great Lakes

Technical information
- Class: B
- ERP: 3,700 watts average 10,400 watts peak horizontal polarization 3,700 watts average 7,880 watts peak vertical polarization
- HAAT: 249 metres (817 ft)

CBLA-FM-2 is the CBC Radio One station licensed to Paris, Ontario, Canada but primarily serving the nearby Waterloo Region. It broadcasts on the FM band at 89.1 MHz.

Previously licensed as a rebroadcaster of CBLA-FM in Toronto, it began originating a limited amount of programming targeting Waterloo Region and surrounding cities in March 2013. Studios are located on King Street West in downtown Kitchener.

== History ==
Prior to 1999, the Kitchener-Waterloo area received CBC Radio programming through CBL Toronto, whose city-grade signal easily covered most of southern Ontario. On July 29, 1997, the Canadian Radio-television and Telecommunications Commission (CRTC) approved the CBC's plan to move CBL to FM; this plan included provisions for new or improved rebroadcasters to serve areas that the new Toronto FM transmitter would not reach, including one at 89.1 FM in Paris.

Originally, the Paris rebroadcaster simulcasted CBLA's main-transmitter schedule for most of the day, including during most regional programming blocks. It even carried the Toronto-based Metro Morning on weekdays, instead of the regional Ontario Morning program also produced in Toronto and carried on most of the Radio One rebroadcasters in southern Ontario. However, like most of these rebroadcasters, it carried (and continues to carry) network programming instead of the first hour of the afternoon-drive program Here and Now, and does not carry any other specially scheduled Toronto-specific programming.

In September 2011, the CBC announced plans to launch a new local radio service for the Kitchener-Waterloo area beginning in fall 2012, as part of the corporation's 2011-15 strategic plan. (The launch date was later pushed back in connection with the CBC's 2012 budget cuts.) The other major city in Waterloo Region, Cambridge, was originally said to be not part of the initial local coverage focus, though this decision was reversed by the time the station launched.

On November 7, 2012, the CRTC published the CBC's application to upgrade CBLA's Paris repeater to a local production centre focused on the Waterloo Region. The application stated that the new station would continue to broadcast programming received from CBC Radio One but would also broadcast a minimum of 12 hours and 30 minutes of local programming targeting Kitchener-Waterloo residents in each broadcast week.

On January 22, 2013, the CBC announced that the new radio programming for Kitchener-Waterloo would debut on March 11. Despite CRTC approval having not been received by that date, the launch went ahead as scheduled. As the CBC had previously been permitted to air different program schedules on different rebroadcasters of CBLA-FM (as noted above) it was not obviously clear that the broadcast was improper, even with the conversion application still outstanding. However, in the evening of April 23, 2013, the CBC announced it had been informed that the early launch was in fact not permitted, which it termed an "unfortunate oversight", and that it was pulling the terrestrial broadcasts of The Morning Edition and other separate Kitchener-Waterloo programming until the new licence was fully approved. In the interim, local programming continued to be produced for Internet streaming, but 89.1 FM reverted to a rebroadcaster of CBLA-FM.

Two days later, on April 25, 2013, the CRTC formally approved the CBC's application for the new Paris station, with its licence replacing the repeater licence used for CBLA-FM-2. However, the transmitter retained its rebroadcaster-like call sign. Over-the-air broadcasts of Kitchener-Waterloo local programming resumed the next day.

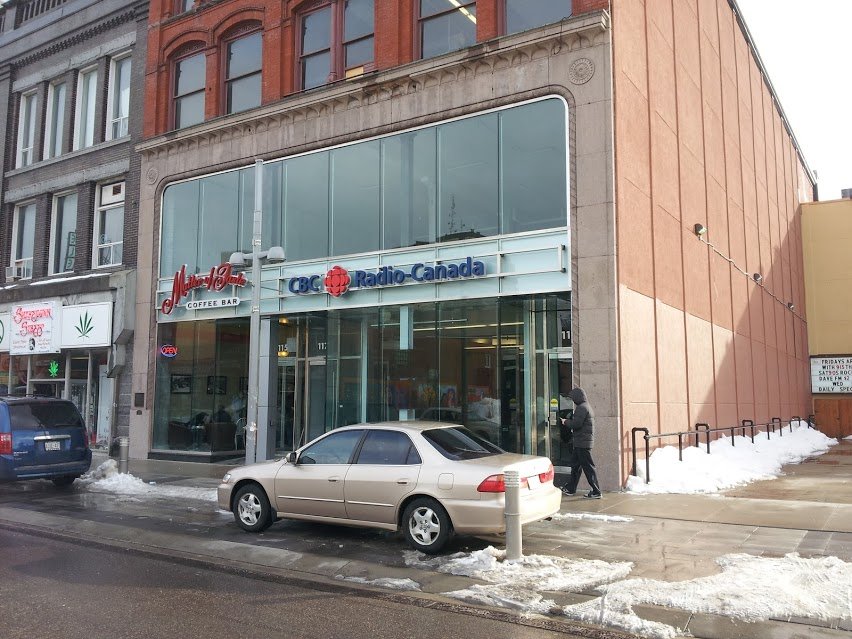
CBLA-FM-2's studios in downtown Kitchener

== Local programming ==
CBLA-FM-2's local morning program, The Morning Edition, hosted by Craig Norris, airs from the studios on King Street West. A Saturday afternoon regional network program highlighting Ontario arts, music and culture, In The Key of C, also hosted by Norris, is produced at the Kitchener studio and heard on all Radio One transmitters in Ontario on Saturday afternoons (except CBLA-FM Toronto which airs Big City, Small World).
