= Leah-Simone Bowen =

Canadian writer, producer, and director

- Born: Edmonton, Alberta
- Education: University of Alberta
- Occupations: Playwright, podcaster

Leah-Simone Bowen is a Canadian writer, producer, and director.

== Personal life ==
Bowen was born in Edmonton, Alberta. She is a first generation Canadian whose family is from Barbados. Bowen currently lives in Toronto, Ontario.

== Work and education ==
Bowen attended the University of Alberta's theatre program. She was the artistic producer at Obsidian Theatre.

In 2016 Bowen was appointed as the theatre grants officer for the Toronto Arts Council. In 2018 Bowen's book The Flood was published by Playwrights Canada Press. The book is based on the history of the St. Lawrence Market in Toronto, Ontario and the history of female prisoners in Canada.

== Theatre ==
Bowen has served as playwright-in-residence at a number of Canadian theatre companies including: the Blyth Festival, Stratford Festival, Cahoots Theatre, Playwright's Workshop Montreal and Obsidian Theatre.

She has been involved in a number of theatre productions including:

- Treemonisha (2020), playwright
- The Hallway (2015), playwright.
- Nowheresville
- Code Word: Time, playwright
- The Postman (2015), playwright.
- The Hours That Remain (2012), assistant director.
- Job's Wife, Summerworks Festival (2009), Third Eye.

== Podcasting ==
Bowen is the creator of the Canadian Broadcasting Corporation podcast, Secret Life of Canada, which she co-hosts with Falen Johnson. This podcast focuses on little known parts of Canadian history and explores the histories of marginalized communities in Canada.
