= Chris Glover (journalist) =

Canadian journalist

Chris Glover is a Canadian television and radio journalist, who was named as the new host of Metro Morning, CBC Radio's local morning program in Toronto, Ontario, in 2026.

== Biography ==
Born and raised in Whitby, Ontario, he studied journalism at Toronto Metropolitan University. He began his career as a journalist in Halifax, and later worked in Winnipeg and Washington, D.C. before transferring to Toronto in the 2010s.

During his time as a television reporter in Toronto, he briefly became a national news story when, while he was doing a live spot from Comedy Bar's emergency meeting responding to SiriusXM Canada's controversial plan to rebrand its Canada Laughs channel, actor Boyd Banks began licking Glover's ear on the air. Banks apologized for his behaviour the following day, and Glover wrote a first-person essay about the incident and its ramifications a few days later, in which he noted that as embarrassed and humiliated as he was, women in journalism regularly face much more persistent and aggressive harassment.

In 2025 he joined the national consumer affairs newsmagazine Marketplace.

He was a Canadian Screen Award nominee for Best Local Reporter at the 9th Canadian Screen Awards in 2021, and won a Radio Television Digital News Association award in 2023 for his coverage of the 2023 Toronto mayoral by-election.

He is out as gay.
