= Ontario Morning =

- Running time: 6:00 am–8:30 am
- Country of origin: Canada
- Language: English
- Home station: CBLA-FM
- Hosted by: Ramraajh Sharvendiran
- Recording studio: Canadian Broadcasting Centre
- Website: cbc.ca/ontariomorning

Ontario Morning is a Canadian radio program, which airs as the CBC Radio One local morning program for non-metropolitan markets in Southern Ontario. While the network's main stations in Toronto, Ottawa, Waterloo Region, Windsor and London each produce their own city-oriented morning programs, nearly all Radio One rebroadcasters in smaller markets air Ontario Morning in place of their host station's program.

The program is produced from the studios of CBLA-FM at the Canadian Broadcasting Centre in Toronto, although it does not air on that station's primary transmitter in Toronto. Past hosts have included Sue Prestedge, Jane Hawtin, Joe Coté, Avril Benoit, Dave Seglins, Erika Ritter, Lorne Saxberg, Martina Fitzgerald, Wei Chen, Julianne Hazlewood, Ramraajh Sharvendiran, and Nav Nanwa. Sharvendiran returned as host of Ontario Morning in October 2025 after a year and a half as interim host of Here and Now in Toronto, with Nanwa remaining with the CBC as a reporter.
