= Anna Maria Tremonti =

Canadian radio and television journalist (born 1957)

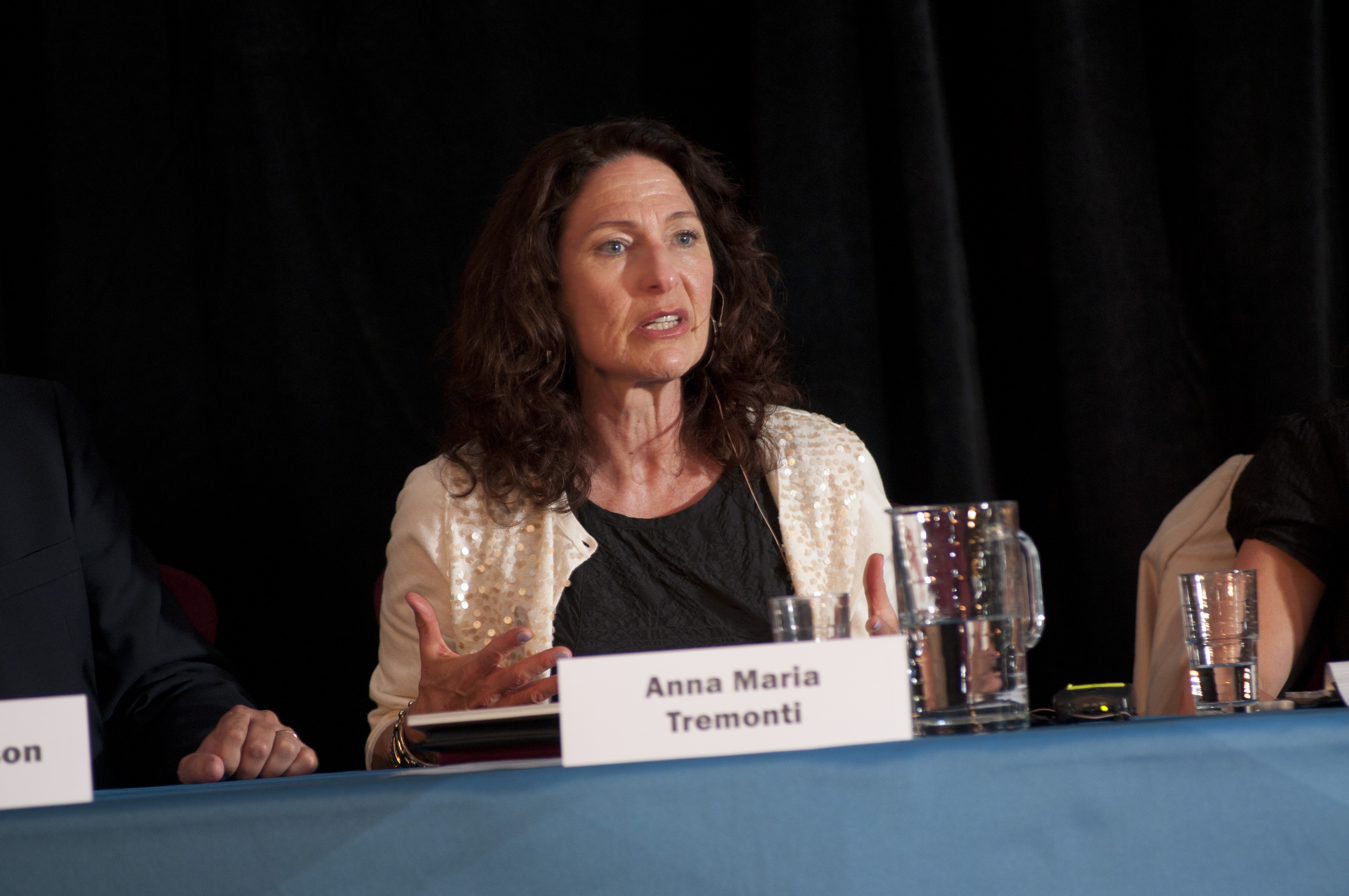
- Makes a point at Muzzled Media in 2011
- Born: July 2, 1957 (age 69); Windsor, Ontario, Canada
- Education: University of Windsor
- Partner: John Filion
- Presenting career
- Show: The Current
- Network: CBC Radio One
- Country: Canada

Anna Maria Tremonti (born July 2, 1957) is a Canadian radio and television journalist who has been featured on a variety of radio and television programs on the CBC.

She has served as a senior reporter for The National, where she won two Gemini Awards, and a host of The Fifth Estate, where she won a Gracie Award. From 2002 until 2019, she hosted CBC Radio One's morning news and current affairs program The Current; in May 2019, she announced that she would retire from the program at the end of her 17th season, and transition to a new role creating and hosting two new CBC podcasts. In November 2019, her first new podcast was announced, which was released in January 2020, as More With Anna Maria Tremonti.

Born in Windsor, Ontario, she began her journalism career at the University of Windsor student newspaper, The Lance, and the university's radio station, CJAM.

Her later experiences included private broadcasting contracts in New Glasgow, Nova Scotia at CKEC Radio and Toronto before serving with the CBC in Fredericton, Halifax, Edmonton, Ottawa and Toronto. She also worked as a CBC correspondent in Europe, and was for several years the chief CBC correspondent in the Middle East.

She is the partner of former Toronto city councillor John Filion. In February 2022, she published Welcome to Paradise on CBC Radio and in podcast format. Welcome to Paradise is an audio memoir of her earlier marriage to an abusive husband.
