= CBLFT-DT =

Television station in Toronto

- Toronto, Ontario; Canada
- Channels: Digital: 25 (UHF); Virtual: 25
- Branding: ICI Ontario

Programming
- Affiliations: 25.1: Ici Radio-Canada Télé

Ownership
- Owner: Société Radio-Canada
- Sister stations: CBLT-DT, CBL-FM, CBLA-FM, CJBC, CJBC-FM

History
- First air date: March 23, 1973
- Former call signs: CBLFT (1973–2011)
- Former channel numbers: Analog: 25 (UHF, 1973–2011); Digital: 24 (UHF, 2005–2011)
- Call sign meaning: "CBC Great Lakes Français Télévision"

Technical information
- Licensing authority: CRTC
- ERP: 106.2 kW
- HAAT: 491.0 m (1,611 ft)
- Transmitter coordinates: 43°38′33″N 79°23′14″W

Links
- Website: ICI Ontario

CBLFT-DT (channel 25) is an Ici Radio-Canada Télé station in Toronto, Ontario, Canada, which broadcasts programming to the province's Franco-Ontarian population. It is part of a twinstick with CBC Television flagship CBLT-DT (channel 5). The two stations share studios at the Canadian Broadcasting Centre on Front Street West in downtown Toronto; CBLFT-DT's transmitter is located atop the CN Tower.

The station provides French-language programming to the Greater Toronto Area and most of Ontario, including the Southwestern, Central and Northeastern regions of the province.

== History ==
CBLFT was originally licensed by the Canadian Radio-television and Telecommunications Commission (CRTC) in 1972 as a standalone station; the station first signed on the air on March 23, 1973. Until CBLFT signed on, CBC O&O CBLT aired French-language programming from Radio-Canada on Sunday mornings. The station originally transmitted from the CBC's Jarvis Street transmitter site, but as with almost all other radio and television stations in Toronto, approval was given by the CRTC to move the transmitter site to the CN Tower on December 14, 1973. Several transmitters in Northern Ontario which were already in operation as rebroadcasters of CBOFT in Ottawa were reassigned to CBLFT's license, and various additional rebroadcasters were added throughout Ontario in the 1970s and 1980s.

In the early 1990s due to budget cutbacks at the CBC, all Radio-Canada transmitters in Ontario (except those in the northwest part of the province, which was served by CBWFT in Winnipeg) were reassigned to the license of CBOFT as rebroadcasters. All of the transmitters that were formerly part of CBLFT's license continued to broadcast a separate local early evening newscast, which was produced in Ottawa, but was only seen in that city via a late night rebroadcast, similar to the split broadcast used at CBC Radio One station CBLA-FM (99.1 FM) for its morning programs.

On April 28, 2010, the CRTC granted a license request by the CBC to relaunch CBLFT as a separate station which would once again produce a distinct local newscast from CBOFT. Most of the network's transmitters in Ontario, except for those in the Ottawa area, were again reassigned to CBLFT's license, and newscast production later returned to Toronto.

== Technical information ==
=== Subchannel ===
Subchannel of CBLFT-DT
Subchannel	Res.	Short name	Programming
25.1	720p	CBLFT-DT	Ici Radio-Canada Télé

=== Analog-to-digital conversion ===
CBLFT shut down its analog signal, over UHF channel 25, on August 31, 2011, the official date on which Canadian television stations in CRTC-designated mandatory markets transitioned from analog to digital broadcasts. The station's digital signal relocated from its pre-transition UHF channel 24 to post-transition (and former analog) channel 25.

Transmitters in mandatory markets were required to switch to digital or shut down by the transition deadline of August 31, 2011. Radio-Canada requested to temporarily broadcast in analog in these markets beyond 2011, as programming for Radio-Canada is not produced in these markets. The following CBLFT rebroadcasters are in mandatory markets:

- CBLFT-8 Kitchener
- CBLFT-9 London
- CBLFT-18 Thunder Bay
- CBEFT Windsor

However, on August 16, 2011, the CRTC granted the CBC permission to continue operating 22 repeaters in mandatory markets, including the above, in analog until August 31, 2012, in which by then they must either convert to digital or close down. This was pending the corporation's licence renewal process, which will include an evaluation of its transition plans.

At some point before June 20, 2012, CBLFT had begun airing a Mobile DTV simulcast of CBLT-DT on virtual channel 5.2, encoded in the H.264 and HE-AAC formats.

=== Transmitters ===
CBLFT operated almost 30 analog television rebroadcasters throughout the province of Ontario and included communities such as London, Kitchener and Sudbury. Additionally, several Radio-Canada transmitters in eastern Ontario, such as Kingston and Belleville, were part of the CBLFT license even though they served cities that were closer to Ottawa than Toronto.

Due to federal funding reductions to the CBC, in April 2012, the CBC responded with substantial budget cuts, which included shutting down CBC's and Radio-Canada's remaining analog transmitters on July 31, 2012. (A transmitter serving Barrie, CBLFT-11, closed down the previous year, in August 2011.) None of CBC or Radio-Canada's television rebroadcasters were converted to digital, leaving rural Canadians and U.S. border regions with no free over-the-air CBC/Radio-Canada coverage. Some affected viewers could get the signal back for a price by subscribing to cable or satellite.

CBLFT is not carried on cable or satellite in the United States.

In many communities, TVOntario transmitted from Radio-Canada sites and therefore permanently left the air the same day. Former rebroadcast transmitters, all now defunct, included:

Former rebroadcasters of CBLFT
Station	City of licence	Channel	ERP	HAAT	Transmitter coordinates
CBLFT-1 (Note: Formerly CBFST; began operations in 1961.)	Sturgeon Falls	7	17.5 kW	188.1 m	46°25′10″N 79°56′3″W
CBLFT-2 (Note: Formerly CBFST-1; began operations in 1962.)	Sudbury	13	17.1 kW	143.6 m	46°30′14″N 80°58′3″W
CBLFT-3 (Note: Formerly CBFOT.)	Timmins	9	30 kW	220 m	48°28′12″N 81°17′49″W
CBLFT-4 (Note: Formerly CBFOT-1.)	Kapuskasing	12	30 kW	133.5 m	49°17′47″N 82°11′9″W
CBLFT-5 (Note: Formerly CBFOT-2.)	Hearst	7	16.8 kW	186.2 m	49°38′50″N 83°30′50″W
CBLFT-6 (Note: Formerly CBFST-3.)	Elliot Lake	12	37 kW	162.2 m	46°23′21″N 82°37′6″W
CBLFT-7 (Note: Formerly CBFST-4.)	Espanola	4 (Note: Formerly broadcast on channel 11.)	0.01 kW	—N/a	46°14′15″N 81°44′28″W
CBLFT-8 (Note: Formerly CBLFT-1.)	Kitchener	61 (Note: Broadcast on channel 76 prior to 1983.)	0.635 kW	198.1 m	43°27′0″N 80°36′7″W
CBLFT-9 (Note: Formerly CBLFT-2.)	London	53 (Note: Broadcast on channel 40 (later used for CBLN-TV) prior to 1988.)	0.34 kW	306.5 m	42°57′16″N 81°21′17″W
CBLFT-10 (Note: Formerly CBLFT-3.)	Chatham	48	40.6 kW	193.2 m	42°27′0″N 82°4′59″W
CBLFT-11	Barrie	55 (Note: Closed down in August 2011.)	14.7 kW	189 m	44°21′0″N 79°41′50″W
CBLFT-12 (Note: Formerly CBLFT-4.)	Peterborough	44	111 kW	267.6 m	44°7′11″N 78°8′11″W
CBLFT-13 (Note: Formerly CBLFT-5.)	Belleville	15	410 kW	170.1 m	44°18′45″N 77°12′24″W
CBLFT-14 (Note: Formerly CBLFT-6.)	Kingston	32	109 kW	169.8 m	44°17′25″N 76°28′42″W
CBLFT-15	Penetanguishene	34	17.4 kW	181.7 m	44°46′10″N 79°59′24″W
CBLFT-16	Driftwood	74	0.1 kW	—N/a	—N/a
CBLFT-17	Sarnia-Oil Springs	17 (Note: Formerly on channel 68, had plans to convert to digital on UHF 17 before shutdown was announced.)	12.12 kW	98 m	42°54′31″N 82°20′19″W
CBLFT-18	Thunder Bay	12	22.7 kW	237.7 m	48°33′2″N 89°13′25″W
CBLFT-19	Nipigon	26	4.3 kW	263.9 m	48°58′18″N 88°18′24″W
CBLFT-20	Sault Ste. Marie	26	3.6 kW	135 m	46°35′50″N 84°16′53″W
CBLFT-21	Gogama	12 (Note: Formerly broadcast on channel 23.)	2.36 kW	197.8 m	47°48′46″N 81°35′39″W
CBLFT-22	Chapleau	13	2.45 kW	36.6 m	47°47′18″N 83°22′48″W
CBLFT-23	Wawa	16	14.8 kW	154.5 m	48°1′13″N 84°45′0″W
CBLFT-24	Dubreuilville	11 (Note: Formerly broadcast on channel 7.)	0.01 kW	—N/a	48°20′52″N 84°32′48″W
CBLFT-25	Manitouwadge	15	55.4 kW	200.6 m	49°8′21″N 85°49′23″W
CBLFT-26	Geraldton	7	3.4 kW	204.2 m	49°43′40″N 86°44′10″W
CBLFT-27	Mattawa	26	16.7 kW	93 m	46°17′13″N 78°40′35″W
CBEFT	Windsor	35 (Note: Previously broadcast on channel 78 until October 29, 1982, and on channel 54 until August 31, 2011.)	36 kW	206.8 m	42°9′12″N 82°57′11″W
CBFST-2	Témiscaming, Quebec	12	14.2 kW	262.3 m	46°38′28″N 79°4′23″W

On December 17, 1985, the CRTC approved the CBC's application to add a transmitter at Thorne/Eldee on channel 16 with 13 watts to rebroadcast the programs of CBLFT Toronto, through CBLFT-1 (channel 7) Sturgeon Falls. Its unknown if the transmitter at Thorne/Eldee was ever launched.
