= The Current (radio program) =

Canadian radio program

- Genre: current affairs
- Running time: 90 minutes
- Country of origin: Canada
- Language: English
- Home station: CBC Radio One
- Hosted by: Matt Galloway
- Original release: November 18, 2002 – present
- Website: http://www.cbc.ca/thecurrent/

The Current is a Canadian current affairs radio program which airs weekday mornings on CBC Radio One. It airs from 8:37 a.m. local time to 10 a.m., with the exception of Newfoundland, where it runs from 9:07 a.m. to 10:30 a.m.

The show features interview sessions and radio documentaries that typically take up a half hour each.

== History ==
The program premiered in 2002, and was hosted from its inception by investigative journalist Anna Maria Tremonti. It was created as a replacement for This Morning, partially in response to criticism that the prior program's prerecorded format had hamstrung the network's ability to pivot to a live breaking news broadcast on the day of the September 11 attacks.

Tremonti retired from the program in June 2019. Laura Lynch served as interim host until the end of 2019, and Matt Galloway took over as the program's new permanent host effective January 6, 2020.

During the COVID-19 pandemic until May 15, 2020, The Current's runtime was extended to the rest of the morning for most of the nation to cover that issue, replacing Q (although it still had its shorter evening broadcast slot) and the various half-hour 11:30 AM shows with the host of the former show, Tom Power appearing for selected arts stories related to the pandemic. In addition, the final hour was pre-empted in most of the nation's time zones by a daily scheduled public address by Prime Minister Justin Trudeau and analysis of it with the remaining time of the final hour covered by reruns of interviews earlier of that day's show.

== Guest hosts ==
On Fridays during the regular season period, a guest host was often used for the broadcast, who would be introduced on the preceding Thursday to read listener correspondence with Tremonti. Guest hosts were usually CBC personalities such as Maureen Taylor, Adrienne Arsenault, Nancy Wilson, Erica Johnson, Ian Hanomansing, Piya Chattopadhyay and Anthony Germain, although other Canadian journalists, including Haroon Siddiqui, Jan Wong and David Frum, also appeared.

In 2004, the program also did a one-off joint broadcast with the American radio program Democracy Now!, with Amy Goodman acting as the guest host of The Current.

During the summer months of July and August, the regular host is replaced as host for the entire period with guests; on major holidays, the show is usually preempted for other network programming, commonly repeat broadcasts of entertainment programs, holiday music, or selections from the CBC's library of podcasts.

== Season-long story themes ==
From 2007 to 2018, the series ran regular season-long arcs of stories that dealt with a particular theme. The themes that were explored have included:

- 2007–08 — "Diet for a Hungry Planet": Food and world hunger.
- 2008–09 — "Watershed": The politics and issues dealing with water.
- 2009–10 — "Work in Progress": Labour and employment related issues.
- 2010–11 — "Shift": Population demographics and the changing nature of Canada's population.
- 2011–12 — "Gamechangers": People and significant events that had made a noticeable change in the world in some fashion.
- 2012–13 — "Line in The Sand: Dilemmas that Define Us": Moral dilemmas.
- 2013–14 — "Project Money": Money and related financial issues.
- 2014–15 — "By Design": Design issues such as industrial design and social design.
- 2015–16 — "Ripple Effect": Stories of consequences of various decisions and technologies, intended or otherwise.
- 2016–17 — "The Disruptors": Stories of people, ideas and things that are disrupting today's society, both negatively and positively.
- 2017–18 — "Adaptation": Stories of people adapting to changing realities in the world.

During the network's summer schedule when The Current was shortened to an hour, selections of these features were rerun as a separate half-hour program. In 2018, The Current ran at the regular length year-round with segments over the regular season rerun during the summer period in addition to new stories. However, in 2019, a compromise in the format was reached with the series running CBC Radio One's original documentary podcasts for the summer, having new content for the first portion of the show and taking advantage of the remaining hour's time to accommodate the podcasts' irregular length. In the 2021–22 season, there was a less formal revisiting of the "Work in Progress" theme regarding employment, especially concerning the impact of the COVID-19 pandemic with selected interviews occasionally rerun during the summer months in addition to the podcasts.

== Humour ==
Although primarily a serious news program, The Current from 2003 to 2012 began each show with a brief satirical commentary by a character credited only as The Voice. The role was performed by actor Stephen Hart.

The Voice also announced fictional advertisements for the "Ambiguous Party", a fictional political party. A few campaign ads were created and aired for morning show listeners' amusement in which The Voice tried to persuade listeners to vote for the Ambiguous Party. Comparisons are made between the Ambiguous Party (complete and utter fence-sitters on all issues) and the current parties of the day.

On June 20, 2019, Hart returned for a guest appearance to pay tribute to Anna Maria Tremonti on her last regular appearance as the show's host.

In addition, as holiday programming on statutory holidays, recorded selections of Stuart McLean's Vinyl Cafe's humorous "Dave and Morley" stories are aired.

== Repeat airings ==
An abbreviated edition of each day's program is repeated at 10 p.m. under the title The Current Review. Prior to 2008, The Review aired a single feature from The Current, alongside one from Sounds Like Canada, under the title Nighttime Review.

The program is also currently repeated at 3 a.m. as part of the CBC Radio Overnight schedule. Although the overnight airing uses the same abbreviated edit as the previous evening's The Current Review, it is titled as The Current.

== Hosts ==
- Anna Maria Tremonti (2002–2019)
- Laura Lynch (2019–2020)
- Matt Galloway (2020–present)
