= Canadian Broadcasting Centre =

Broadcasting centre in Toronto, Ontario

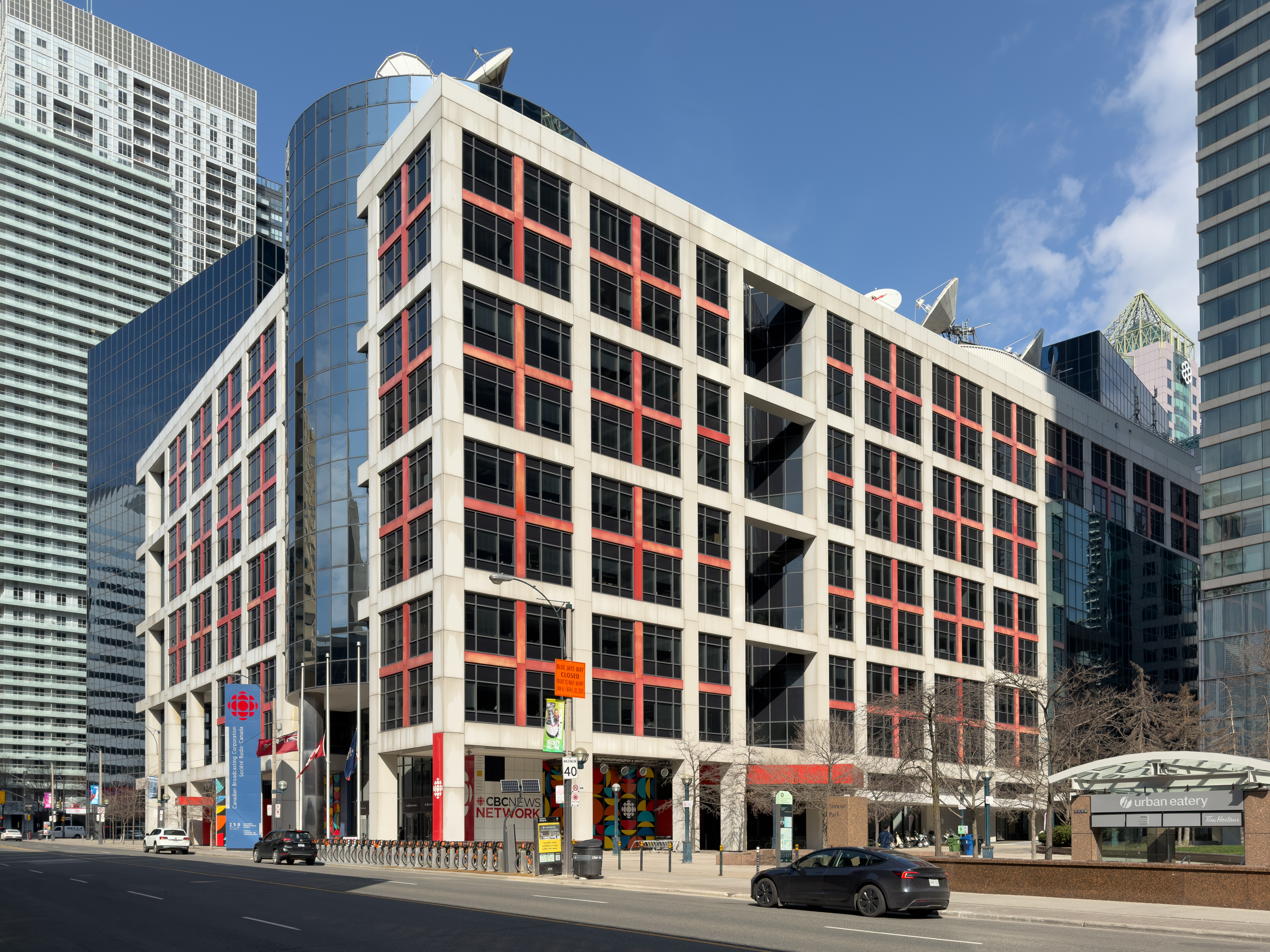
- Canadian Broadcasting Centre in 2025
- Alternative names: Toronto Broadcast Centre

General information
- Status: Completed
- Type: Broadcasting centre
- Location: 250 Front Street West; Toronto, Ontario; M5V 3G7
- Coordinates: 43.644833°N 79.388194°W
- Current tenants: North American Broadcasters Association; Bensimon Byrne
- Construction started: April 1988
- Completed: 1992
- Owner: Canadian Broadcasting Corporation

Technical details
- Floor count: 13
- Floor area: 1,720,000 square feet (160,000 m^{2})

Design and construction
- Architect: Philip Johnson
- Architecture firm: John Burgee Architects
- Developer: Bregman + Hamann Architects
- Other designers: Barton Myers

Other information
- Public transit: Union subway

Website
- www.cbc.ca/facilities/sp.html

The Canadian Broadcasting Centre, also known as the Toronto Broadcast Centre, is an office and studio complex located in Toronto, Ontario, Canada. It serves as the main broadcast and master control centre for the Canadian Broadcasting Corporation's English-language television and radio services. It also contains studios for local and regional French-language productions and is the headquarters of the North American Broadcasters Association. Two floors of the facility house the ad agency Bensimon Byrne and its subsidiaries Narrative and OneMethod.

The analogous facility for the CBC's French language services is Maison Radio-Canada in Montreal, while corporate headquarters are located at the CBC Ottawa Production Centre.

The Canadian Broadcasting Centre is at 250 Front Street West in downtown Toronto, with additional entrances at 205 Wellington Street West and 25 John Street, directly across from the Metro Toronto Convention Centre. It is within walking distance of Union Station, the Rogers Centre, and the CN Tower and connected to the city's PATH underground walkway network.

== History ==
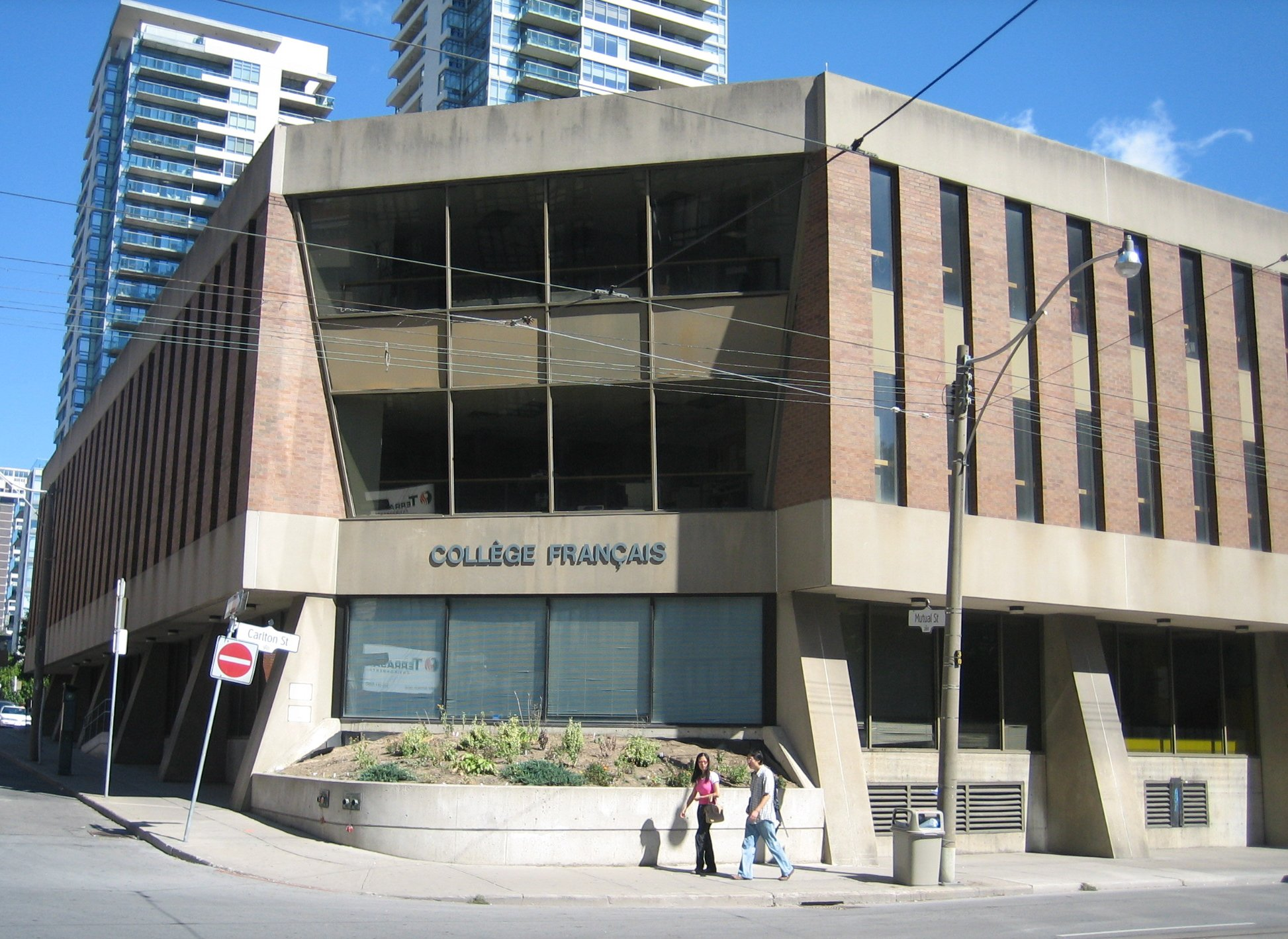
72 Carlton Street, one of 26 CBC Toronto pre-consolidation locations

The 13-storey broadcast complex is partly located on the site of the First Ontario Parliament Buildings (or the Third Parliament Building of Upper Canada), which stood on the block bounded by Wellington, John, Front, and Simcoe streets between 1832 and 1903. Constructed at a cost of CA$350 million (excluding technology renewal), the Canadian Broadcasting Centre complex entered service in 1993. Previously, the CBC's Toronto operations had been based at a smaller facility on Jarvis Street, near the former television transmitter.

Its architectural, structural, and infrastructural design features eventually incorporated, among others, the emergent concepts and information technologies underlying Digital HDTV, Digital Radio Broadcast, IT platform as a "Global Information Server and MultiMedia Cloud" integrated with the Internet. The project's leading aim was much-needed integration of large number of CBC employees who were located at 26 separate facilities throughout Toronto and modernization of the CBC corporate automation infrastructure in preparation for the 21st century.

The project required over twelve years of planning with particular emphasis (1988–90) on critical IT strategic planning, digital archives, multimedia, interactive TV, corporate office automation, and high-capacity advanced corporate intranet technology design dependent on physical considerations including fiber-optics and electromagnetic interference from within and nearby sources such as the CN Tower. It took another four years for construction completion, corporate IT platforms, communication backbone, skeletal communication structure erection and S/W applications refurbishment. Without the loss of one minute of airtime, the personnel and the systems migrated to the new facility, which was recognized to be the most advanced of its kind in the world with a minor technology challenge posed only by CNN Center in Atlanta, Georgia.

Television production is located on the upper floors (with many programs recorded in the three rooftop studios), and radio on the second, third and fourth floors. Some of the larger sound stages are rented out to outside movie, television and commercial productions, such as Global's Canadian versions of Deal or No Deal, Are You Smarter Than a 5th Grader?, YTV's Life with Boys, and a multitude of commercials for Ford, Canadian Tire, among others.

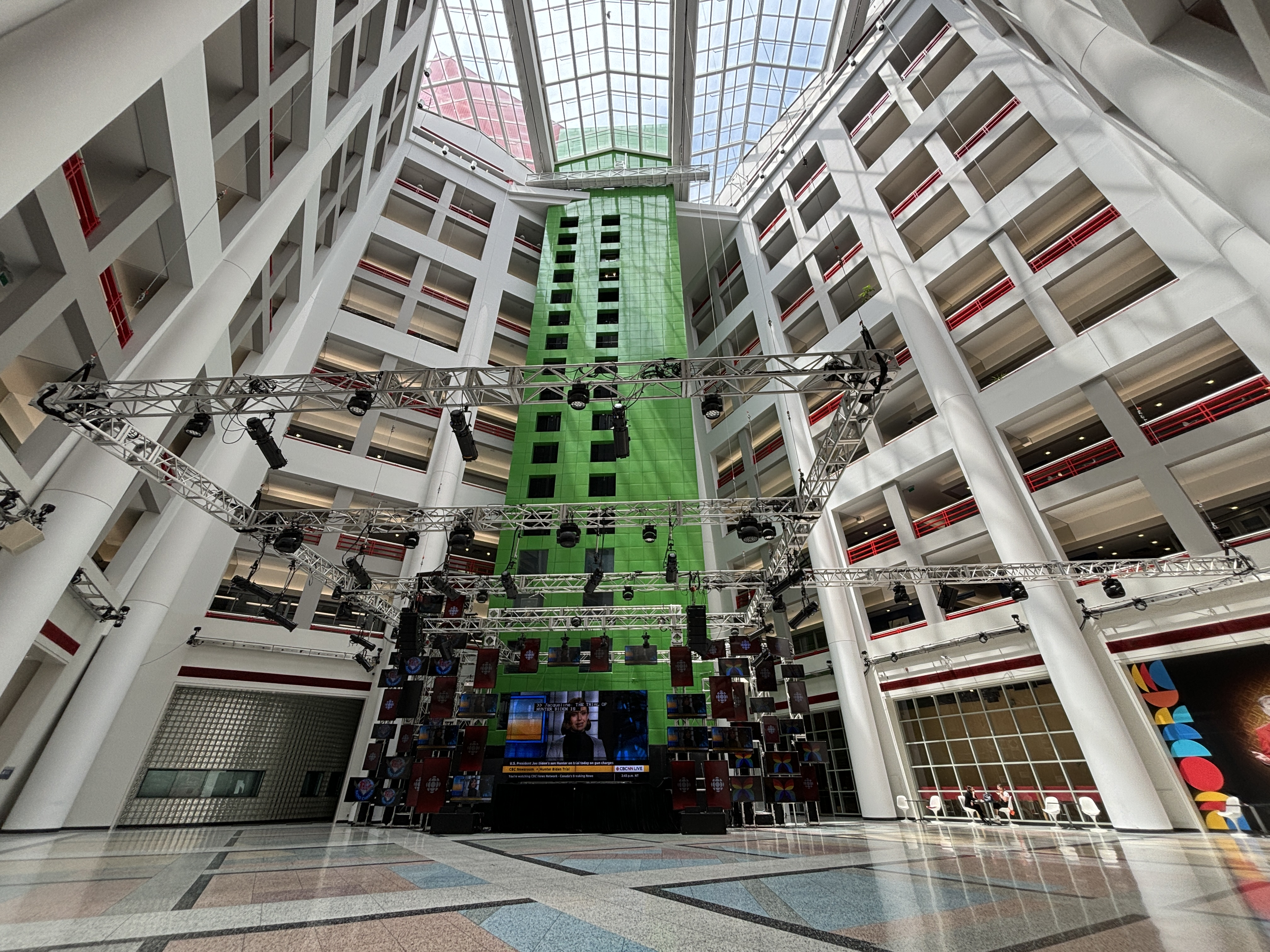
Barbara Frum Atrium

The structure sits on 3,000 massive hard-rubber pads to reduce unwanted noise and vibrations. Therefore, all studios are located in the core of the building. The complex also has four 1250-kilowatt Cummins generators to provide power to critical loads during a power failure. The atrium was named for Barbara Frum, a noted Canadian journalist. It is used as the venue for special broadcasts, including federal election coverage and the 2000 Today millennium special, and episodes of Canadian Antiques Roadshow.

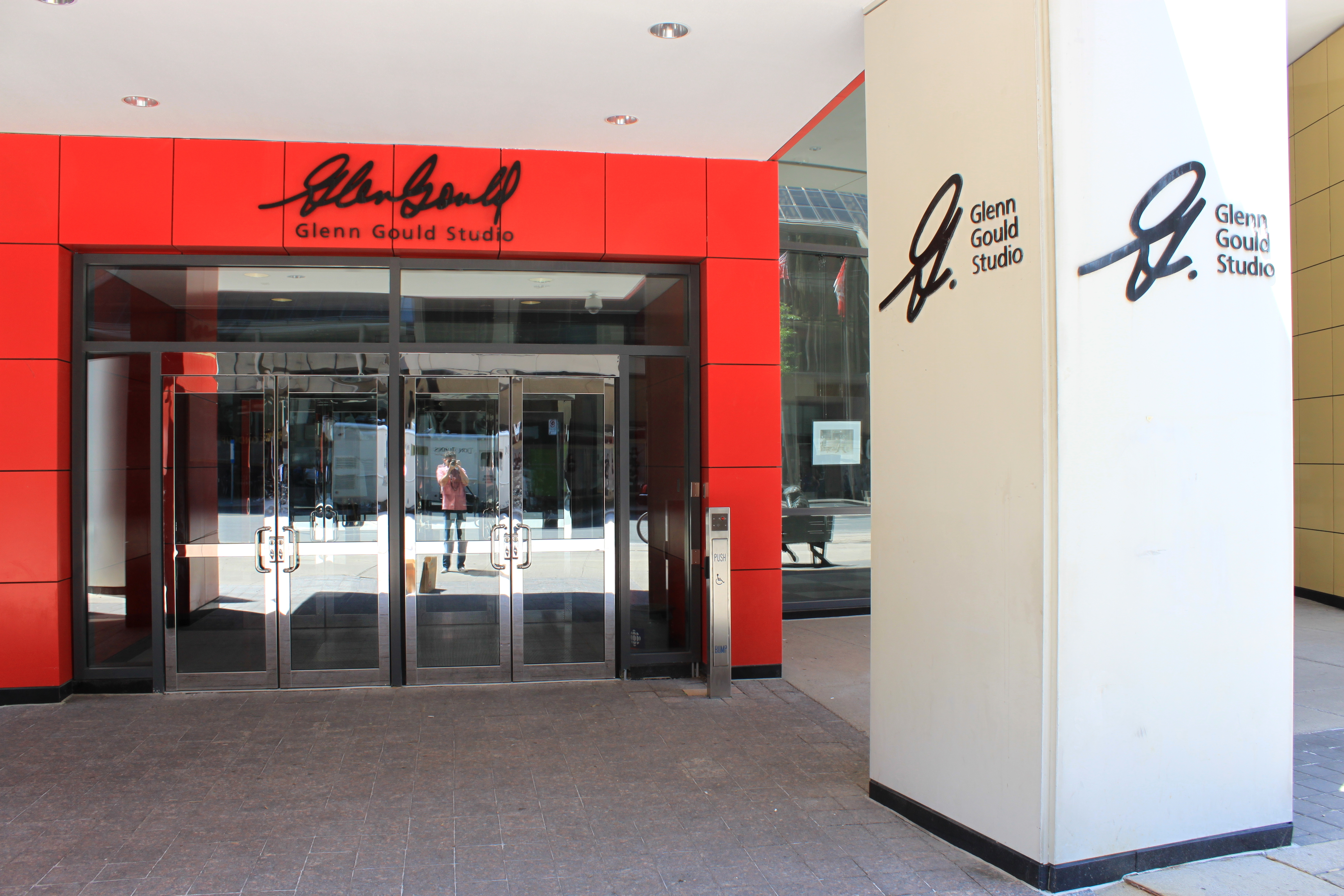
The Glenn Gould Studio is one of three radio studios at the Broadcasting Centre.

The building contains three radio studios (including the Glenn Gould Theatre), 19 radio production studios, three television studios, two local television studios, two all-purpose studios, and one national news studio. Local programming for the Toronto stations CBLA-FM (CBC Radio One), CBL-FM (CBC Music), CJBC (Ici Radio-Canada Première), CJBC-FM (Ici Musique), CBLT-DT (CBC Television), and CBLFT-DT (Ici Radio-Canada Télé) are produced in these studios, in addition to national programming for the CBC's television and radio networks.

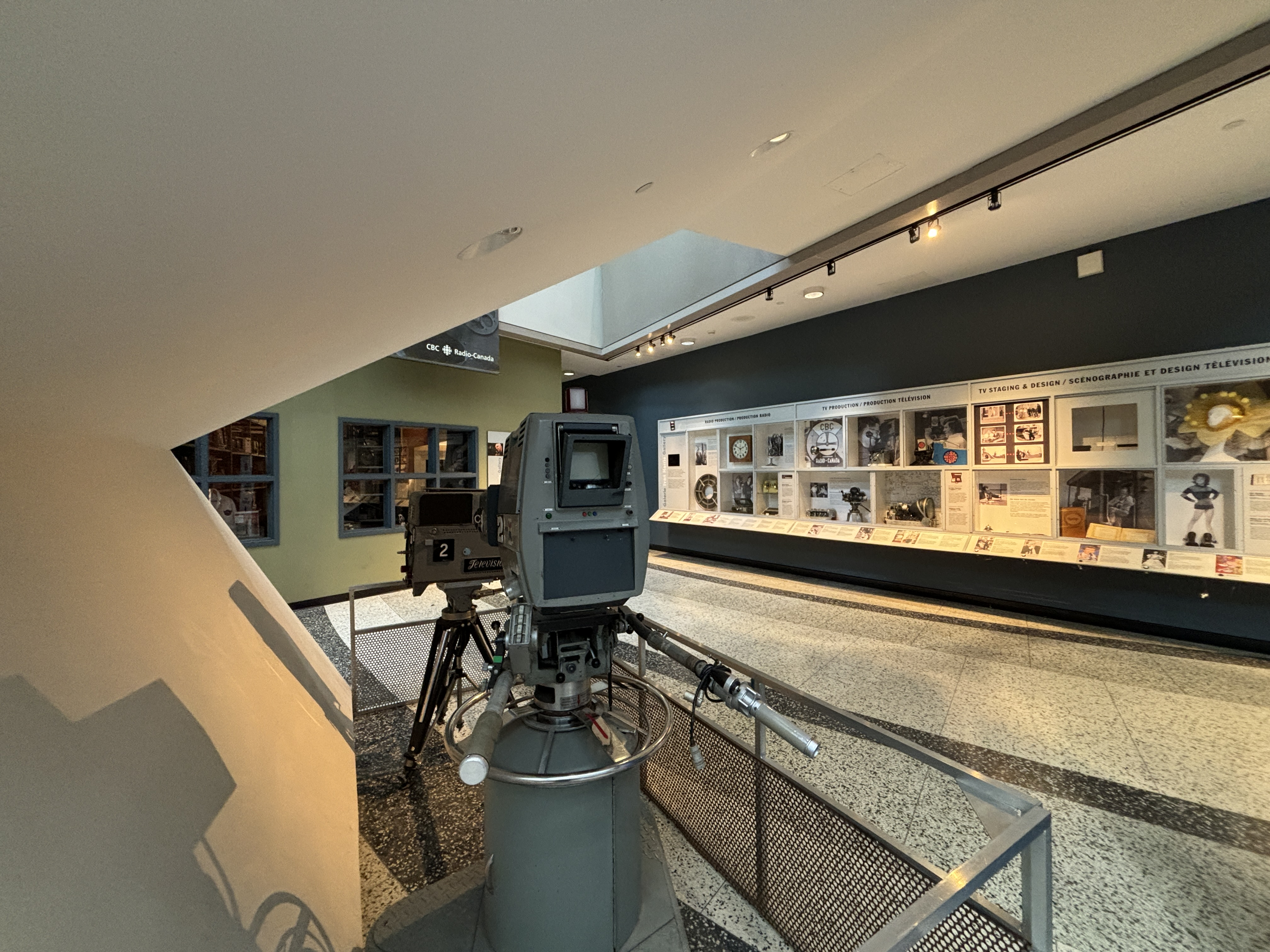
CBC Gallery in PATH level

The former CBC Museum, dedicated to preserving the memories and physical artifacts of the national broadcaster's heritage, was located on the first floor of the building. Exhibits included the original "Tickle Trunk" from Mr. Dressup (Casey's treehouse from the same series is on display in the lobby just outside the entrance to the museum), a portion of the original set used for Friendly Giant, Muppet puppets from Sesame Park, video clips from numerous programs, and original sound and tape equipment. Additional exhibits of memorabilia from CBC's history are also located in other areas on the first floor. The museum closed in 2017 and its collection was transferred to Ingenium, the federal Crown corporation which operates Canada's national science and technology museums. In 2018, this space was re-opened as the CBC Kids studio. The studio has windows along the south wall and a glass entrance allowing visitors to see inside and observe filming when production is on. It features a replica Tickle Trunk and many other nods to historic Canadian children’s television. The studio launched with a live public event called the "Thankathon".

In 2015, the CBC announced that it was considering selling the building and leasing back parts of it. Due to zoning restrictions, the CBC opted to retain ownership of the building while leasing out parts of it.

The analogous facility for the CBC's French-language networks is Maison Radio-Canada in Montreal. The CBC's corporate headquarters are located in Ottawa in the CBC Ottawa Production Centre.

== Security and threats ==
The so-called Toronto 18 terrorists included the building in their list of targets in a 2006 Ontario terrorism plot.

In 2010, the broadcast centre was inside of the secure zone due to the 2010 G-20 Toronto summit protests and employees were not allowed to leave the building during portions of the rioting when gates into and out of the zone were locked down.

A Canadian Security Intelligence Service (CSIS) regional office is located on Front Street West directly across from the Canadian Broadcasting Centre, and helped identify suspicious packages and led to the arrest of a suspect in 2011.

The broadcast centre in downtown Toronto had to be evacuated in November 2015 after someone taking stock of inventory in the archives stumbled upon what looked like a military shell. Police and military bomb technicians were called in and determined the shell was inert.

In 2018, a user on website incel.me called on other users to attack the CBC and shoot employees, leading to increased security and Toronto Police Service being called.

== Television studios ==
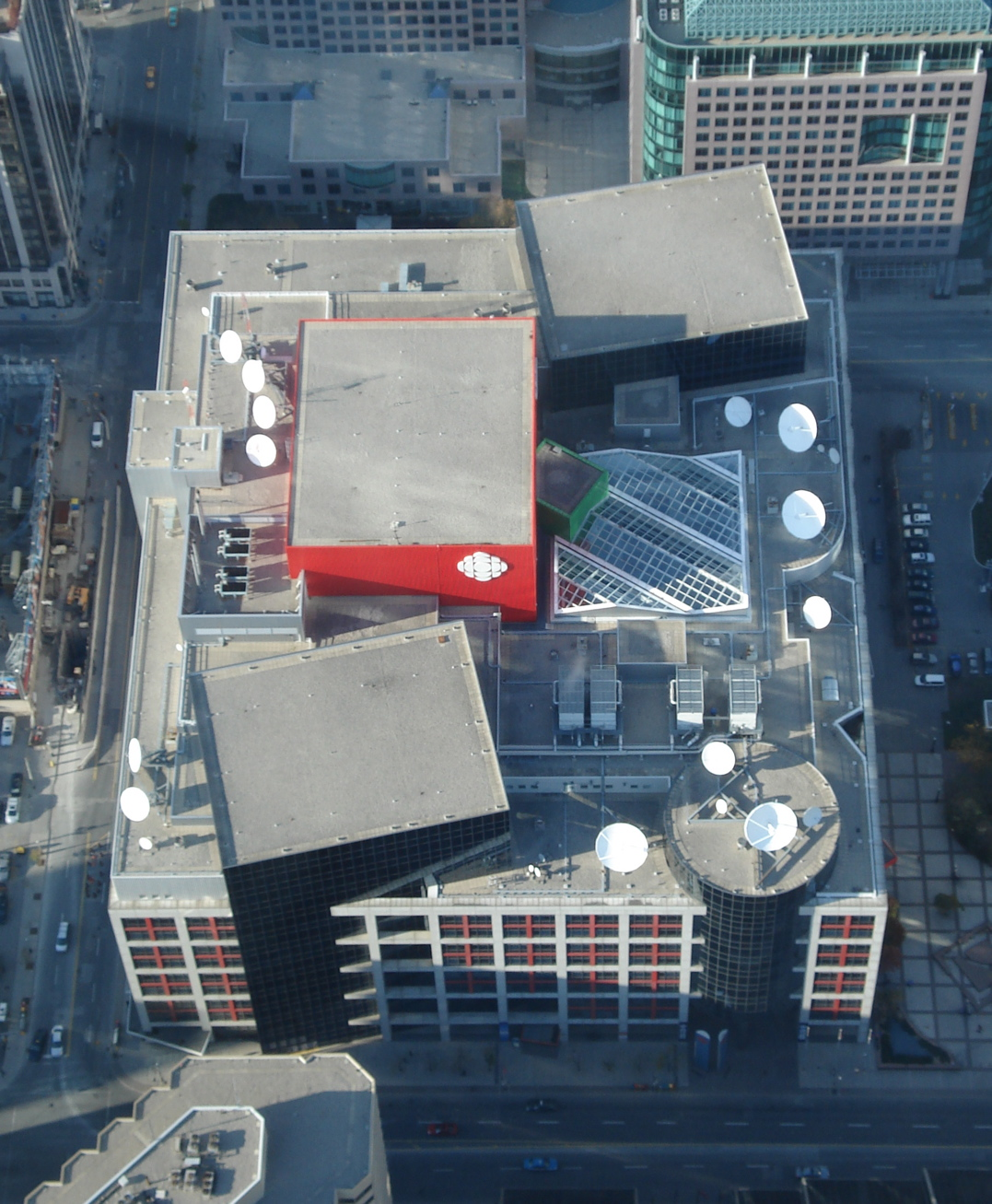
The roof of the Broadcasting Centre, as seen from the CN Tower. Studio 40 is centre, flanked by studios 41 and 42.

- Studio 40 – 13,287 square feet (1234 m^{2}) – Located on the 10th floor of the building, with a ceiling height of 18 m (60 feet), this studio is described by CBC as "the largest purpose built multi-camera capable studio soundstage in Canada." Productions filmed in this studio have included Dragons' Den, Canada's Smartest Person, Deal or No Deal Canada, Family Feud Canada, The Price is Right Tonight and various Paris By Night shows.
- Studios 41 and 42 – 11,070 square feet (1024 m^{2}) each – Also on the 10th floor, these two studios are almost identical, and have been used by many of CBC's comedy programs, including Air Farce Live, Rick Mercer Report, The Ron James Show and The Red Green Show. Studio 41 was leased by Sportsnet to serve as the studio for its NHL coverage, including Hockey Night in Canada, until they relocated to the Rogers Building in 2021.
- Studios 43 and 65 – 4,345 square feet (404 m^{2}) each – Located on the 6th floor, these smaller studios have been used for the CBC's talk show and lifestyle programming, including George Stroumboulopoulos Tonight, Steven and Chris and The Goods. The classic children's television show Mr. Dressup was taped in former Studio 4 at Yonge and Marlborough until the broadcast centre opened in 1992.
- Studio 50 – size unknown – The studio for the CBC's 24-hour news channel, CBC News Network.
- Studio 55 – size unknown – Home to CBC's flagship national news program The National.
- Studio 73 – 1,386 square feet (129 m^{2}) – Located on the 5th floor, this studio is equipped with a large green screen, and is used to tape the hosted segments of CBC Kids, among others.

== See also ==
- CBC Toronto (English TV)
- CBC Toronto (French TV)
- Simcoe Place - commercial building part of the complex, joined by underground facilities.
- Death to Smoochy - 2002 film set in this location as KidNet Studios.
