= CBLA-FM =

CBC Radio One station in Toronto, Canada

- Toronto, Ontario; Canada
- Broadcast area: Golden Horseshoe
- Frequency: 99.1 MHz (HD Radio)

Programming
- Language: English
- Format: Public radio/News/Talk
- Subchannels: HD2: CBL-FM simulcast
- Network: CBC Radio One

Ownership
- Owner: Canadian Broadcasting Corporation
- Sister stations: CBL-FM, CJBC, CJBC-FM, CBLT-DT, CBLFT-DT

History
- First air date: March 5, 1928
- Former call signs: CKGW (1928–1932); CRCT (1932–1937); CBL (1937–1999)
- Former frequencies: 910 kHz (1928–1929); 690 kHz (1929); 960 kHz (1929–1931, 1933-1934); 840 kHz (1931–1933, 1934-1941); 740 kHz (1941–1999)
- Call sign meaning: Canadian Broadcasting Corporation Great Lakes A

Technical information
- Licensing authority: CRTC
- Class: C1
- ERP: 55,100 watts (average); 98,000 watts (peak)
- HAAT: 303.7 metres (996 ft)

Links
- Webcast: Listen live
- Website: CBC Toronto

CBLA-FM (99.1 MHz) is a non-commercial radio station in Toronto, Ontario, Canada. Owned and operated by the Canadian Broadcasting Corporation, the station is the flagship station of the CBC Radio One network, broadcasting a mix of news and talk. In addition to the Toronto market, CBLA also reaches much of Central Ontario with a network of twelve rebroadcasters. The studios are in the Canadian Broadcasting Centre.

CBLA-FM has an average effective radiated power (ERP) of 55,100 watts, peaking at 98,000 watts. The transmitter is atop First Canadian Place, at King and Bay Streets. It uses a directional antenna to avoid interference with stations in the U.S. Besides a standard analog transmission, CBLA streams its programming online.

== History ==
=== CKGW and CBL ===
CBLA's origins date back to March 5, 1928. That was the official sign on of CKGW at 910 AM, a commercial station owned by Gooderham and Worts, with studios at the King Edward Hotel. However, Gooderham & Worts had been operating the station on an experimental basis from as early as 1925.

Due to the instability of frequency allocations in North America at the time, the station's frequency changed several times over the next number of years, to 960, 690 and finally clear channel 840.

CKGW was one of several privately owned Toronto stations whose facilities were used by railway broadcasting networks. By the end of 1924, CNR Radio linked Toronto stations CFCA and CKGW by telegraph line during "CNR-paid time" under the CNRX phantom call sign; in 1931, CKGW shared time on 840 kHz with CNRT. Canadian Pacific Radio's Toronto phantom station CPRY also used CKGW's facilities in the early 1930s.

In 1932, the station was leased by the CBC's predecessor, the Canadian Radio Broadcasting Commission. It used the call sign CRCT until 1937, when the station was purchased outright by the CBC and adopted the call letters CBL. It moved to a new transmitter facility in rural Hornby. The 650 ft guyed mast that the station transmitted from was for many years the tallest structure in all of Canada.

=== 740 AM ===
With North American Regional Broadcasting Agreement (NARBA) in 1941, the station moved to 740 kHz. Its former channel, now 860 kHz, went to CFRB (which would relocate to 1010 kHz in 1947), while the 840 kHz clear channel was relocated to Louisville, Kentucky, where it was taken by WHAS. (See Canadian allocations changes under NARBA.)

Between 1938 and 1943, CBL had a rebroadcaster, CBY, to supplement coverage in Toronto. CBY broadcast on 960 kHz, switching to 1420 in 1939 and then to 1010 in 1941. CBY is now CJBC 860, Toronto's Ici Radio-Canada Première French language station.

=== 99.1 FM ===
In 1946, CBL-FM was launched, bringing the CBC's FM network (now known as CBC Music) to Toronto. It originally broadcast on the same 99.1 MHz frequency now used by CBLA, but moved to 94.1 in 1966. 99.1 was vacant until 1977, when it was assigned to the CKO radio network. CKO ceased operations in 1989, and the frequency was again vacant until it was assigned to CBLA.

CBL established a large low-power relay transmitter (LPRT) network in Northern and Central Ontario during the 1950s and '60s. These transmitters, all on AM frequencies, mainly rebroadcast the CBL signal but also offered some separate regional programming directed towards the regions served by the LPRT network in place of some local Toronto programming. One example of this was the daily Northern Ontario Report, which aired in the late afternoon. Most of these LPRT network transmitters now rebroadcast CBCS-FM in Sudbury or CBQT-FM in Thunder Bay. Some of these transmitters have switched to FM as well, or have been shut down as FM transmitters covering areas served by multiple AM transmitters have signed on.

In 1997, CBL applied to the Canadian Radio-television and Telecommunications Commission for conversion to FM. 740's daytime signal easily covered Buffalo, New York; Erie, Pennsylvania and Youngstown, Ohio. It was also powerful enough to serve as the CBC outlet for the Waterloo Region as well. Its nighttime signal reached much of the eastern half of North America (including three-fourths of Canada). However, radio frequency interference made the station nearly unlistenable in some parts of downtown Toronto. In a controversial decision, the CBC was awarded the 99.1 frequency over Milestone Radio, which had applied to open an urban music station, and which would have been the first station operating under that format in Canada, to serve the city's large black community. Adding to the controversy of the CBC being awarded a station on the FM band in the country's biggest market, 99.1 was believed at the time to be the last available FM frequency in the city. On April 19, 1998, the new FM signal signed on for the first time, and began simulcasting CBL.

Former CBC Radio One logo used until 2018

On June 18, 1999, the station completed its move to FM, adopting the callsign CBLA-FM. CBL 740 remained in operation for an additional day, broadcasting a recorded loop listing alternative FM frequencies for any remaining listeners. The final announcement ran thus:

This is CBC Radio One, broadcasting from the Hornby transmitter at 740 AM. In the Toronto area, we will now move to 99.1 FM, with additional frequencies throughout southern Ontario. This transmitter has served the community well since 1937, and has been at 740 AM since 1941. This is the end of an era in Canadian broadcasting history. Now, signing off, from CBL, adieu.

— Philip Savage, CBC Communications department

=== Relay transmitters and HD Radio ===
The CBC subsequently surrendered two relay transmitters outside the city which duplicated the CBLA signal. In 2000, the CRTC awarded one of the new frequencies thereby available in Toronto to Milestone, which launched CFXJ in 2001, and the other to the Aboriginal Voices Radio Network, launching CFIE-FM in 2002; that frequency later became home to CFPT-FM. The Hornby transmitter was leased to the new occupant of 740, CHWO, in 2001. That station is now known as full-service oldies station CFZM.

The CBC Jarvis Street Tower site was demolished in 2002 to make way for the RadioCity condominium development.

On October 4, 2021, CBLA added HD Radio operations, as part of upgrades in Toronto, Ottawa and Vancouver.

== Local programming ==
The station's local morning program is Metro Morning, and Toronto's most popular radio show in the ratings since 2004. Chris Glover was named the program's new host on May 20, 2026, following several weeks of guest hosts after prior host David Common transferred to CBC News Network in January. Here and Now, hosted by Farrah Merali, airs in the afternoon slot.

On weekend mornings the station produces Fresh Air, hosted by Ismaila Alfa and heard throughout Ontario. Saturday afternoons the station broadcasts an arts and culture magazine, Big City, Small World, hosted by Errol Nazareth.

The station also produces a second morning program, Ontario Morning, which airs on most of the network's transmitters in Southern Ontario outside of the Toronto, Kitchener-Waterloo, Ottawa, London and Windsor metropolitan areas. Ontario Morning is currently hosted by Ramraajh Sharvendiran. Similarly, the aforementioned Big City, Small World is replaced by CBLA-FM-2 Kitchener-Waterloo's In the Key of C (formerly CBO-FM Ottawa's Bandwidth until its cancellation) on all of the station's rebroadcasters outside Toronto.

Since October 2005, Here and Now has begun at 3 p.m. on CBLA's main transmitter in Toronto, unlike most CBC Radio One stations whose local afternoon programs begin at 4 p.m. However, the station's rebroadcast transmitters outside of Toronto air regular CBC network programming for the first hour and join Here and Now in progress at 4.

CBLA's rebroadcaster in Crystal Beach, which serve areas within commuting distance of Toronto, normally air Metro Morning instead of Ontario Morning, but otherwise abides by the schedule used by other rebroadcasters – it carries neither the 3 p.m. hour of Here and Now, nor any other specially-scheduled programming specific to the Toronto area. (For example, special weekend editions of Metro Morning aired on CBLA during the 2010 G20 Toronto summit; however, the Crystal Beach and Paris transmitters carried a morning show originating from Ottawa, as did CBLA's other rebroadcasters outside Toronto.)

In September 2011, the CBC announced plans to launch a new local radio service for the Kitchener-Waterloo area beginning in fall 2012, re-using the existing transmitter, CBLA-FM-2 (89.1 FM) in Paris. On November 7, 2012, the CBC applied to the CRTC to convert CBLA-FM-2 to a self-sustaining FM radio station, which would carry national CBC Radio One programs, along with a minimum of 12 hours and 30 minutes a week of local programming. The new station commenced programming on March 11, 2013, but was later forced to resume rebroadcaster-only service in April, due to a misunderstanding of the application details and the conditions of the repeater license. The new station received full approval from the CRTC on April 25, 2013. Prior to its sign-on, CBLA-FM-2 carried the same schedule as the provincial CBLA feed, apart from Metro Morning (Kitchener-Waterloo, like Crystal Beach, is also within commuting distance of Toronto).

== Rebroadcasters ==
CBLA-FM has the following rebroadcasters.

Rebroadcasters of CBLA-FM
City of licence	Identifier	Frequency	Power	Class	RECNet	CRTC Decision	Notes
Bancroft	CBLA-FM-5	99.3 FM	269 watts	A	Query	2014-488	45°3′34.92″N 77°51′32.04″W
Crystal Beach	CBLA-FM-1	90.5 FM	319 watts	A	Query	98-428	42°55′35.04″N 79°5′35.16″W
Haliburton	CBLY-FM	92.3 FM	250 watts	A1	Query	89-765	45°2′35.16″N 78°29′40.92″W
Huntsville	CBLU-FM	94.3 FM	70,000 watts	C1	Query	92-783	45°24′38.16″N 79°15′20.88″W
Maynooth	CBOD-FM	89.3 FM	110 watts	A1	Query	89-612	45°13′36.84″N 77°52′28.92″W
Orillia	CBCO-FM	91.5 FM	5,200 watts	B	Query	88-487	44°32′58.92″N 79°32′8.16″W
Owen Sound	CBCB-FM	98.7 FM	100,000 watts	C1	Query		44°44′33″N 80°54′18″W
Parry Sound	CBLR-FM	89.9 FM	180 watts	A1	Query	92-783	45°23′24″N 80°2′20.04″W
Penetanguishene	CBCM-FM	89.7 FM	2,800 watts	A	Query	98-27	44°46′10.92″N 79°59′27.96″W
Peterborough	CBCP-FM	98.7 FM	10,170 watts	B	Query	98-516	44°7′15.96″N 78°8′8.16″W
Shelburne	CBLA-FM-4	102.5 FM	2,600 watts	A	Query	2001-157	44°3′11.16″N 80°19′18.12″W
Wingham	CBLA-FM-3	100.9 FM	11,800 watts	B	Query	99-192	44°1′4.08″N 81°11′44.88″W

In the 1970s, the CRTC approved the CBC's application to change the frequency of CBOD Maynooth from 1230 kHz to 1400 kHz and later moved to 89.3 MHz in 1989.

In 1986, the CRTC approved the CBC's application to change the frequency of CBLY Haliburton from 710 kHz to 1400 kHz and later moved to 92.3 MHz in 1989. In 2021, the CRTC approved the CBC's application to increase CBLY-FM's power from 50 watts to 250 watts.

On December 2, 1998, the CRTC approved the CBC's application to change the frequency for CBCP-FM Peterborough from 93.5 MHz to 98.7 MHz. CBCP-FM originally signed on in Peterborough at 93.5 FM in 1980.

On July 4, 2014, the CBC submitted an application to convert CBLV Bancroft from 600 kHz to 99.3 MHz; this was approved on September 23, 2014. In March 2015, the call sign CBLA-FM-5 was chosen for the new FM transmitter to replace CBLV. CBLV was one of the last AM low-power relay transmitters to rebroadcast CBLA-FM Toronto.

=== Former rebroadcasters ===
- Kitchener-Waterloo - CBLA-FM-2 89.1 - A former repeater of CBLA-FM what is now a local CBC Radio One outlet serving the Kitchener-Waterloo region.

=== Shortwave relay (VE9GW/CRCX) ===
CRCX
- Bowmanville, Ontario; Canada
- Frequencies: 6.095 MHz; 11.81 MHz; 24.38 MHz

Programming
- Format: shortwave radio
- Network: CRBC (1933–36); CBC (1936–38)

Ownership
- Owner: Gooderham & Worts (1930–36); CBC (1936–38)
- Sister stations: CKGW/CRCT/CBL

History
- First air date: April 1930
- Last air date: 1938
- Former call signs: VE9GW (1930–35)
- Call sign meaning: Canadian Radio Commission X

Gooderham & Worts opened an experimental shortwave radio station in April 1930 with the callsign VE9GW. Listed as being located at Bowmanville, Ontario, at CKGW's transmitter site, it relayed CKGW programming on 6095 kHz to northern Ontario, northern Manitoba and the Canadian Arctic. While mostly relaying programming from CKGW, it would also air a regular specialty programme for DXers in the International Short Wave Club. The station also carried religious services conducted by the Rev. James Edward Ward from St. Stephen-in-the-Fields Anglican Church in Toronto. Ward's radio services, which were also broadcast over CFRB, attracted an international audience; the church describes Saint Stephen's as the first Canadian church whose services were broadcast directly across the Atlantic.

After switching to a new transmitter in the winter of 1930–1931, the station boosted its power to 200 watts from 25 watts and it could be received as far away as Europe, South Africa, and New Zealand on either 6.095 or 11.81 MHz, and would later broadcast on 24.38 MHz, as well. In 1932, the station's power increased to 500 watts. From 1933 to 1936, CKGW and VE9GW were leased from Gooderham & Worts by the Canadian Radio Broadcasting Commission, which used the station as one of the broadcasters of Northern Messenger, a mailbag programme aimed at listeners in the Far North, which the CBC would continue to air into the 1970s. CKGW became CRCT and, in 1935, VE9GW's callsign changed to CRCX. In 1937, both stations were purchased by the new Canadian Broadcasting Corporation. CRCT became CBL and CRCX was closed down in 1938. The station mostly broadcast on 6.095 MHz but, at various times, transmitted on 11.81 or 24.38 MHz.

== Former callsigns ==
CBLA is a former callsign of a defunct CBC radio transmitter in Atikokan, as well as the defunct CBLR in Red Rock that now belongs to CBLA's rebroadcaster in Parry Sound.
