= CJBC-FM =

Radio station in Toronto, Ontario, Canada

- Toronto, Ontario; Canada
- Frequency: 90.3 MHz (HD Radio)
- Branding: Ici Musique

Programming
- Language: French
- Format: Adult album alternative; Public Music
- Subchannels: HD2: CJBC (AM) simulcast

Ownership
- Owner: Canadian Broadcasting Corporation
- Sister stations: CJBC; CBLA-FM; CBL-FM; CBLT-DT; CBLFT-DT

History
- First air date: November 3, 1992
- Call sign meaning: Jarvis Street Baptist Church (which founded an early radio station in Toronto)

Technical information
- Class: B
- ERP: 5,730 watts; 10,000 watts maximum
- HAAT: 303.7 metres (996 ft)

Links
- Website: www.icimusique.ca

CJBC-FM (90.3 MHz) is a non-commercial, public, French-language radio station in Toronto, Ontario, Canada. It carries the programming of Radio-Canada's Ici Musique network. The studios are in the Canadian Broadcasting Centre on Front Street West in Downtown Toronto.

CJBC-FM is a Class B station. It has an effective radiated power (ERP) of 5,730 watts (10,000 watts maximum). The transmitter is atop First Canadian Place on King Street West in Toronto's Financial District.

== History ==
The station signed on the air on November 3, 1992. It is a sister station to CJBC (860 AM), which is part of the Ici Radio-Canada Première network.

In December 2017, CJBC-FM added an HD Radio feed to broadcast a high-quality digital radio signal. CJBC-FM has retransmitters in Windsor and Paris, serving Kitchener and Waterloo.

== Programming ==
As a part of the Ici Musique network, CJBC-FM mainly broadcasts the same programs as the rest of the network. However, as the Ici Radio-Canada Première station in Toronto is heard on AM radio only, CJBC-FM simulcasts the local Toronto Ici Première morning and afternoon drive time programs Y'a pas deux matins pareils and L'heure de pointe. The morning show has been simulcast since 2004. The afternoon show has been simulcast on CJBC-FM since 2020, with a full-time simulcast of the AM station later added on the HD2 subchannel.

== Transmitters ==
Rebroadcasters of CJBC-FM
City of licence	Identifier	Frequency	Power	Class	RECNet	CRTC Decision	Notes
Windsor	CJBC-FM-1	103.9 FM	1,260 (6,000 maximum) watts	A	Query	2006-187	42°18′59.04″N 83°2′57.84″W
Paris (Kitchener/Waterloo)	CJBC-FM-2	89.9 FM	4,960 (14,800 maximum) watts	B	Query	2002-126	43°15′38.88″N 80°26′38.04″W
