= CBL-FM =

CBC Music radio station in Toronto, Canada

- Toronto, Ontario; Canada
- Broadcast area: Central Ontario
- Frequency: 94.1 MHz
- Branding: CBC Music

Programming
- Format: Adult Album Alternative - Adult Contemporary - Classical - Jazz - Folk - World music/Public broadcasting

Ownership
- Owner: Canadian Broadcasting Corporation
- Sister stations: CJBC, CBLA-FM, CJBC-FM

History
- First air date: October 7, 1946
- Former call signs: VE9EV (1946–1947); CBC-FM (1947–1968)
- Former frequencies: 99.1 MHz (1946–1966)
- Call sign meaning: Canadian Broadcasting Corporation Great Lakes

Technical information
- Class: C1
- ERP: 37,400 watts
- HAAT: 449 metres (1,473 ft)
- Repeater: 99.1 CBLA-FM HD2 (Toronto)

Links
- Webcast: Listen live
- Website: CBC Toronto

CBL-FM (94.1 MHz) is the flagship station of the CBC Music network. It is a non-commercial station, licensed to Toronto, Ontario, and is owned by the Canadian Broadcasting Corporation.

CBL-FM's studios and offices are located at the Canadian Broadcasting Centre, on Front Street West, while its transmitter is located atop the CN Tower.

== History ==
Former logo adopted in February 2017 after the rebrand to CBC Music.

CBL-FM was launched on October 7, 1946, with the callsign VE9EV, as an FM simulcast for 740 CBL. It was the corporation's second FM station behind VE9CB in Montreal (now CBFX-FM). In 1947, its callsign was changed to CBC-FM. The station originally broadcast at 99.1 MHz, but moved to 94.1 in 1966. (The 99.1 frequency was vacant until 1977, when it was assigned to the CKO all-news radio network. CKO ceased operations in 1989, and the frequency was again vacant until it was assigned to CBLA-FM, co-owned with CBL-FM.)

As part of an 18-month trial for a nationwide FM network, CBC-FM began airing separate programming in 1960, playing mostly classical music along with the corporation's other English-language FM stations (CBM-FM Montreal and CBO-FM Ottawa). CBC-FM returned to simulcasting CBL in 1962, but resumed separate programming again in 1964. The station was renamed CBL-FM in 1968. The FM network was rebranded CBC Stereo on November 3, 1975, CBC Radio Two in 1997 and CBC Music in 2018, as it shifted away from mostly classical music, to a mix of adult album alternative, classical, jazz and other genres.

== Rebroadcasters ==
Rebroadcasters of CBL-FM
City of licence	Identifier	Frequency	RECNet	CRTC Decision	Notes
Huntsville	CBL-FM-1	106.9 FM	Query	2005-264	45°24′38.16″N 79°15′20.88″W
Kingston	CBBK-FM	92.9 FM	Query		44°17′21.84″N 76°28′49.08″W
London	CBBL-FM	100.5 FM	Query		42°57′15.84″N 81°21′16.92″W
Orillia	CBL-FM-3	90.7 FM	Query	2002-456	44°32′58.92″N 79°32′8.16″W
Owen Sound	CBL-FM-4	97.1 FM	Query		44°44′33″N 80°54′18″W
Paris	CBL-FM-2	90.7 FM	Query	99-1	43°15′38.88″N 80°26′38.04″W
Peterborough	CBBP-FM	103.9 FM	Query		44°7′15.96″N 78°8′8.16″W

On February 15, 1979, the CRTC approved the CBC's application to operate a new FM transmitter in Belleville on 94.3 MHz (CBBB-FM) and on May 7, 1979, the CRTC also approved the CBC's application to operate a new FM transmitter in Brockville on 104.9 MHz (CBBA-FM), to rebroadcast the programming originating from CBL-FM Toronto. Neither of these transmitters in Belleville and Brockville were implemented and the frequencies were awarded to other broadcasters.

In 1979, CBBK-FM began broadcasting at 92.9 MHz in Kingston.

In 1983, a rebroadcaster was added at Peterborough operating at 103.9 MHz as CBBP-FM.

On June 28, 2005, the CRTC approved the CBC's application to change the frequency of its transmitter CBL-FM-1 104.7 to 106.9 MHz. This change of frequency was to eliminate significant interference with a local radio station CFBK-FM operating at 105.5 MHz in Huntsville.
