= CJBC (AM) =

Ici Radio-Canada Première station in Toronto

- Toronto, Ontario; Canada
- Broadcast area: Southern Ontario
- Frequency: 860 kHz
- Branding: Ici Radio-Canada Première

Programming
- Language: French
- Format: Public radio; news/talk
- Network: Ici Radio-Canada Première
- Affiliations: CBC Dominion Network (1944–1962)

Ownership
- Owner: Canadian Broadcasting Corporation
- Sister stations: CJBC-FM; CBLA-FM; CBL-FM; CBLT-DT; CBLFT-DT

History
- First air date: October 5, 1925
- Former call signs: CKNC (1925–1933); CRCY (1933–1938); CBY (1938–1943)
- Former frequencies: 840 kHz (1925–1928); 690 kHz (January 1927); 580 kHz (1928–1931); 1030 kHz (1931–1935); 1420 kHz (1936–1941); 1010 kHz (1941–1948)
- Call sign meaning: Jarvis Street Baptist Church (which set up an early radio station in Toronto)

Technical information
- Licensing authority: CRTC
- Class: A (clear-channel)
- Power: 50,000 watts
- Repeater: 90.3 CJBC-FM HD2 (Toronto)

Links
- Website: ici.radio-canada.ca/ohdio/premiere

CJBC (860 kHz) is a French language, non-commercial, public radio station in Toronto, Ontario. It is the Ici Radio-Canada Première Network's outlet for much of Southern Ontario. The studios are in the Canadian Broadcasting Centre on Front Street West in Downtown Toronto.

CJBC is a Class A station. It runs at 50,000 watts, the maximum power for Canadian AM stations. It uses a non-directional antenna. The transmitter is on Auburn Road in Milton near Ontario Highway 401. CJBC programming is heard on five rebroadcasters around Southern Ontario.

== History ==
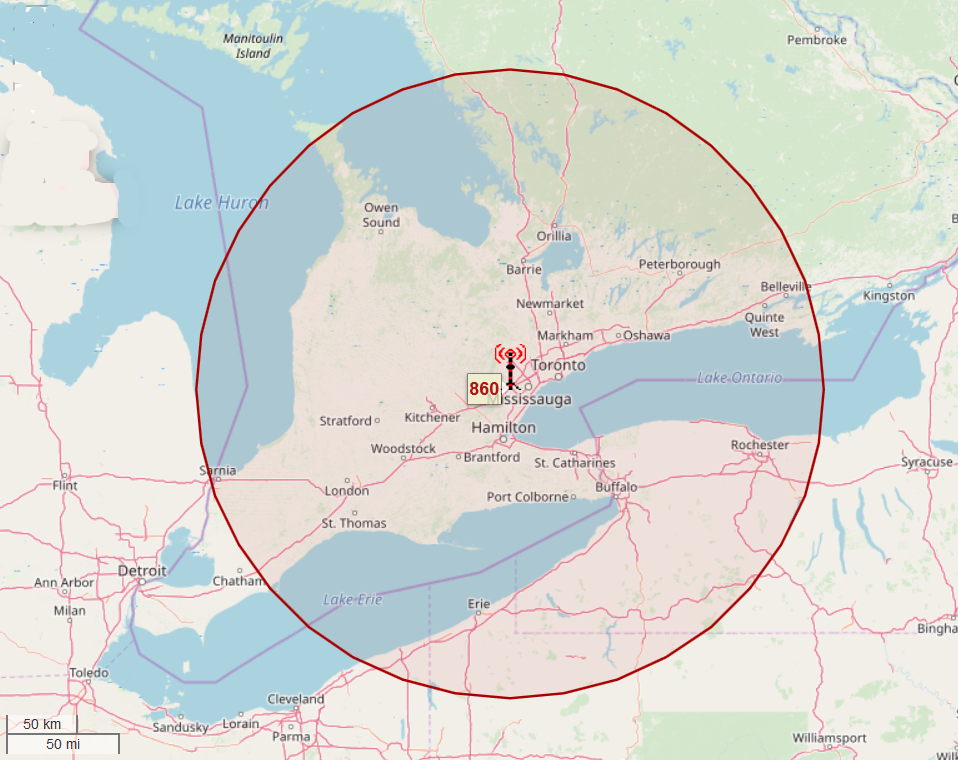
Broadcast area for the station.

=== Early years ===
The station signed on the air in 1925. Its original call sign was CKNC and it broadcast on 840 kHz. It was owned by the Canadian National Carbon Company. In January 1927, the station moved to 690 kHz, returning to 840 kHz a month later. The station then moved to 580 in 1928, and to 1030 in 1931.

In 1933, the station was leased and then acquired by the Canadian Radio Broadcasting Commission, the forerunner of the modern Canadian Broadcasting Corporation. It became CRCY, before leaving the airwaves in 1935. The following year, it returned on 1420 kHz, as a signal booster for CRCT. The station's call sign was changed to CBY in 1938. In 1941, with the enactment of the North American Regional Broadcasting Agreement (NARBA), the station moved to 1010 kHz.

=== Unusual call sign ===
A previous radio station with the call sign CJBC was owned and operated by the Jarvis Street Baptist Church from 1925 until 1933. That station went dark in 1933, after the government of Canada withdrew all religious broadcasting licenses.

The CJBC call letters were subsequently acquired by the Canadian Broadcasting Corporation to replace CBY. They were transferred on November 15, 1943. The call signs for all other CBC and Radio-Canada stations in major cities begin with "CB".

=== CBC Dominion Network ===
In 1944, CJBC became the flagship station of the CBC's Dominion Network. On September 1, 1948, CJBC moved to its current frequency, 860 kHz, exchanging frequencies with the privately owned CFRB, which moved to 1010. CJBC's signal strength was boosted to 50,000 watts, up from its previous strength of 1,000 watts.

As a Dominion network affiliate, the station carried network programming in the evening, which included light entertainment fare and some American shows. Local programming and news was heard during the day.

=== French programming ===
CJBC began carrying some French language programming in 1962, initially in the form of a nightly, half-hour newscast. With the closure of the Dominion Network on October 1, 1962, CJBC's French schedule expanded to two hours of programming each evening. The station adopted a French-only schedule when it became a fully fledged Radio-Canada station on October 1, 1964.

Federal Member of Parliament Ralph Cowan attempted to fight the changeover, arguing that since the French language had no legal status outside of Quebec, the station's conversion to French was inappropriate and illegal. However, his case was dismissed by the Ontario Supreme Court in 1965 on grounds of legal standing, as Cowan could not show material harm from the format change.

=== Ontario rebroadcasters ===
The station has been carried on rebroadcasters in Belleville, Kingston and Midland-Penetanguishene since 1977, London since 1978, and Peterborough since 1980. CJBC also had rebroadcasters under the CJBC call sign that served most of Northern Ontario. Those were changed over to CBON-FM programming out of Sudbury after that station signed on in 1978.

CBEF in Windsor, although officially licensed as a separate station, has also been a de facto rebroadcaster of CJBC. Staffing cutbacks in 2009 resulted in only limited programming originating in Windsor. The station maintained a skeleton staff of just two reporters for local news breaks, while otherwise simulcasting CJBC's programming the rest of the time. Eventually, CBEF expanded its local programming with a morning program and local news bulletins, though otherwise broadcasting a similar schedule as CJBC.

On July 8, 2024, the CRTC published applications by the CBC to reassign the London rebroadcaster, CJBC-4-FM, to CBEF, following a request by a coalition of Francophone groups in that area to receive the Windsor station's programming.

A sister station, CJBC-FM 90.3, was launched in 1992, to broadcast Radio-Canada's FM music network. Since 1993, the CJBC studios have been based at the Canadian Broadcasting Centre on Front Street West in Downtown Toronto.

=== Nested rebroadcaster proposal ===
In 2011, following the revocation of CKLN-FM's licence, the CBC submitted an unsuccessful application to the CRTC to add a nested rebroadcaster of CJBC on 88.1 FM in Toronto. It would have an average effective radiated power (ERP) of 98 watts and a height above average terrain (HAAT) of 303.4 metres. The rebroadcaster would help improve reception in areas of Toronto, due to inefficiencies of the AM signal.

On September 11, 2012, the 88.1 FM frequency was awarded to Central Ontario Broadcasting, which launched a station on 88.1 as CIND-FM, "Indie88". Beginning in 2020, CJBC's weekday morning and afternoon drive time programs were simulcast on CJBC-FM 90.3, which carries Ici Musique network programming the other hours of the week, with a full-time simulcast later added on 90.3 HD2.

== Programming ==
The station's regional morning program is Y'a pas deux matins pareils, and its regional afternoon program Dans la mosaïque, is also heard on CBEF in Windsor. On Saturdays, CJBC airs the provincewide morning program À échelle humaine, which also airs on CBON-FM in Sudbury and CBEF.

On public holidays, Pas comme d'habitude is heard provincewide (except Ottawa). On some holidays, Y'a pas deux matins pareils or Le matin du Nord from CBON-FM airs on both stations, but on some other holidays, both stations either air their local shows as usual or carry CBEF's Matins sans frontières.

== Transmitters ==
Rebroadcasters of CJBC
| City of licence | Identifier | Frequency | Power | Class | RECNet | CRTC Decision | Notes |
|---|---|---|---|---|---|---|---|
| Belleville | CJBC-1-FM | 94.3 MHz | 34,950 watts | B | Query | 92-764 | 44°18′51.12″N 77°12′25.92″W |
| Kingston | CJBC-2-FM | 99.5 MHz | 1,560 watts | A | Query | | 44°17′21.84″N 76°28′49.08″W |
| London | CJBC-4-FM | 99.3 MHz | 22,500 watts | B | Query | | 42°57′15.84″N 81°21′16.92″W |
| Penetanguishene | CJBC-3-FM | 96.5 MHz | 15,300 watts | B | Query | | 44°46′10.92″N 79°59′27.96″W |
| Peterborough | CJBC-5-FM | 106.3 MHz | 13,000 watts | B | Query | | 44°7′15.96″N 78°8′8.16″W |
