= List of The National personalities =

== Anchors ==
=== Primary ===
- 1954–1959: Larry Henderson
- 1959–1966: Earl Cameron
- 1966–1969: Stanley Burke
- 1969–1970: Warren Davis
- 1970–1976: Lloyd Robertson
- 1976–1978: Peter Kent
- 1978–1988: Knowlton Nash
- 1988–1992: Peter Mansbridge
- 1992–1995: Alison Smith
- 1995–2017: Peter Mansbridge
- 2017–2020: Adrienne Arsenault, Rosemary Barton, Andrew Chang, Ian Hanomansing
- 2020–present: Adrienne Arsenault and Andrew Chang

=== Weekend/Fill-in ===
- Jan Tennant (1974–1982)
- George McLean (1978–1983)
- Peter Mansbridge (1984–1988)
- Knowlton Nash (1988–1992)
- Alison Smith (1990–1992, 2005)
- Brian Stewart (1992–2009)
- Adrienne Arsenault (1998–2017)
- Carole MacNeil (2004–2009)
- Evan Solomon (2004–2009)
- Jacquie Perrin (–2009)
- Diana Swain (2005–present)
- Amanda Lang (2009–2015)
- Wendy Mesley (2009–2020) (Regular host Fridays and Sundays)
- Kim Brunhuber (2009–present)
- David Common
- Ian Hanomansing (2020–present) (Regular host Fridays and Sundays)
- Heather Hiscox
- Mark Kelley
- Asha Tomlinson (2021-present) (guest anchor)

== Reporters ==
=== Current ===
- Sandra Abma, National Arts Reporter
- Adrienne Arsenault, London, England
- Nahlah Ayed, Montreal (2002–Present)
- Keith Boag (1983–Present)
- Kim Brunhuber, Toronto
- David Common
- Kelly Crowe
- Gillian Findlay, Toronto (1978–Present)
- Mellissa Fung, Toronto (2003–Present)
- Rob Gordon (1992–Present)
- Havard Gould
- Ian Hanomansing, Vancouver (1986–Present)
- Paul Hunter
- Mark Kelley (1995–Present)
- Amanda Lang, Toronto (2009–2015)
- Neil Macdonald, Washington, D.C. (1988–Present)
- Duncan McCue, Vancouver (1992–Present)
- Wendy Mesley, Toronto (1985–Present)
- Susan Ormiston, Toronto (1977–1991, 2001–Present)
- Saša Petricic, Ottawa (1993–Present)
- Reg Sherren, Winnipeg (2000–Present)
- Katie Simpson
- Julie Van Dusen (1988–Present)

Don Newman (1976-2009) Don Newman (broadcaster)

=== Former ===
- Claude Adams (1988–1991)
- Paul Adams
- Rosemary Barton
- Chris Brown
- Laurie Brown
- Patrick Brown (1980–2008)
- Lynda Calvert
- Bill Cameron
- Ron Charles
- Michelle Cheung
- Natalie Clancy
- Marisa Dragani
- Carolyn Dunn
- Robert Fisher (1978–1988)
- John Fitzgibbon
- Laurie Graham
- David Halton
- Tom Harrington
- Michael Hornbrook
- Der Hoi–Yin (1985–1995)
- Tom Kennedy (1976–2001)
- Fred Langan (1969–2009)
- John Main
- Peter Mansbridge (1975–1988)
- Don Newman (1976-2009)
- Claire Martin, Vancouver (2005–2014)
- Terry Matte (1971–1997)
- Margo McDiarmid
- Terry Milewski (1980–2007)
- Rex Murphy, Toronto (1994–2017)
- Tom Murphy
- Don Murray
- Steve Paikin (1988–1992)
- Lynne Robson
- Eve Savory (1981–2008)
- Joe Schlesinger (1966–1994)
- Alison Smith (1989, 1996–2009)
- Eric Sorensen (1992–2006)
- Brian Stewart (1971–1985, 1987–2009)
- Kevin Tibbles
- Judy Waytiuk (1979–1987)
- Karen Webb
- Nancy Wood
- Paul Workman (1982–2006)

== Commentators ==
=== Current ===
- Bob McDonald is the newscast's science commentator.
- Gwynne Dyer appears occasionally, commenting on world and military affairs.
- Rex Murphy contributes a weekly commentary on a segment entitled "Point of View", which runs just before the end of the broadcast. (1994–Present)
- A political panel titled "At Issue" airs weekly except during the summer. The regular panelists are columnists Andrew Coyne and Chantal Hébert from Maclean's and the Toronto Star respectively, and Allan Gregg, of Decima Research.

=== Former ===
- Keith Boag (1999-2009)
