= CBC Parliamentary Television Network =

Canadian satellite-cable network (1979–1992)

- Country: Canada
- Broadcast area: National
- Headquarters: Ottawa, Ontario

Programming
- Languages: English, French

Ownership
- Owner: Canadian Broadcasting Corporation

History
- Launched: September 1979
- Closed: October 1992
- Replaced by: CPAC
- Former names: The House of Commons Broadcast Service

CBC Parliamentary Television Network was a Canadian cable television specialty channel that broadcast the House of Commons of Canada proceedings via Anik satellite to Canadian cable television headends between September 1979 and 1992.

== History ==
The House of Commons Broadcast Service was established in October 1977 to maintain the video and audio equipment for broadcasting House of Commons proceedings. CBC had applied for the license in June 1979 to broadcast the House of Commons video feed with additional commentary. A competitive bid, by Canadian cable tv consortium, Cable Satellite Network (CSN) did not get a license for this service. The responsibility to distribute the signal was assigned to the Canadian Broadcasting Corporation. CBC used the Anik satellites to distribute the proceedings to Canadian cable companies.

For most of the network's history, John Warren hosted a preview monologue before the beginning of daily proceedings and provided a short summary afterward.

In 1989, the CBC and a consortium of cable television providers made a joint proposal for the creation of a new entity, the Canadian Parliamentary Channel (CPaC) that would carry the proceedings of the House of Commons and committees, along with proceedings of royal commissions, enquiries, court hearings and provincial legislatures, and public affairs programming. A review of parliamentary broadcasting resulted but the CPaC proposal was not acted upon. In December 1990, the CBC announced that as a result of budget cuts the CBC "is no longer able to bear the cost of operating the English- and French-language parliamentary channels. The government will seek the views of the Speaker of the House and consider means of maintaining the service." The CBC announced that it was discontinuing its role as the parliamentary broadcaster effective April 1, 1991. As an interim measure, the House of Commons' Board of Internal Economy negotiated a temporary contract with the CBC to provide parliamentary coverage for an additional year while the Board considered proposals to take over the service. In 1992, the Board came to an agreement with Canadian Parliamentary Channel, Inc., a consortium of 25 cable companies, to take over the CBC's role. The Cable Public Affairs Channel, owned by a consortium of Canadian cable companies, took over responsibility for broadcasting the House of Commons of Canada proceedings in 1992.

== Hours of operation ==
Live Coverage (Eastern Time)
Day	Time Period
Monday	1:55 p.m. to 6 p.m.; 7:55 p.m. to 10:30 p.m.
Tuesday	1:55 p.m. to 6 p.m.; 7:55 p.m. to 10:30 p.m.
Wednesday	1:55 p.m. to 6 p.m.
Thursday	1:55 p.m. to 6 p.m.; 7:55 p.m. to 10:30 p.m.
Friday	10:55 p.m. to 1 p.m.; 1:55 p.m. to 5 p.m.

== Other uses ==
At times of special occasions, the network was used to carry coverage of Canadian Radio-television and Telecommunications Commission (CRTC) hearings, as happened in the fall of 1981 to license Canada's first pay television services.

During the summer of 1984, Pope John Paul II toured Canada. The network was used to carry live coverage as he visited several cities.

In October 1984, NASA TV coverage of mission STS-41-G was simulcast, as Canada's first astronaut in space, Marc Garneau, served aboard the Space Shuttle Challenger.

In 1986, it was used to air CBC's The National and The Journal at 10 p.m. Eastern when it was preempted on the main CBC network by the Stanley Cup playoffs. This prompted complaints from the cable services and the CBC's privately owned affiliates and the network was rebuked by the CRTC for not having first asked for authorization from the CRTC. Commission chairman Andre Bureau commented "We're not against the CBC using the parliamentary channel for special events if they are authorized to do so by the CRTC, but they should respect the regulations and come to us first." The experiment was not repeated.

== CBC-2 ==
For a while during the 1980s, CBC suggested that its broadcast day could be expanded into a second CBC network, CBC-2. However, when they applied to the CRTC for this network, they denied it for that purpose.

== Notes ==
- The CBC Parliamentary Television Network. Communications Services. CBC Head Office. October 1982.
