= Peter Mansbridge =

Canadian broadcast journalist (born 1948)

Peter Mansbridge OC
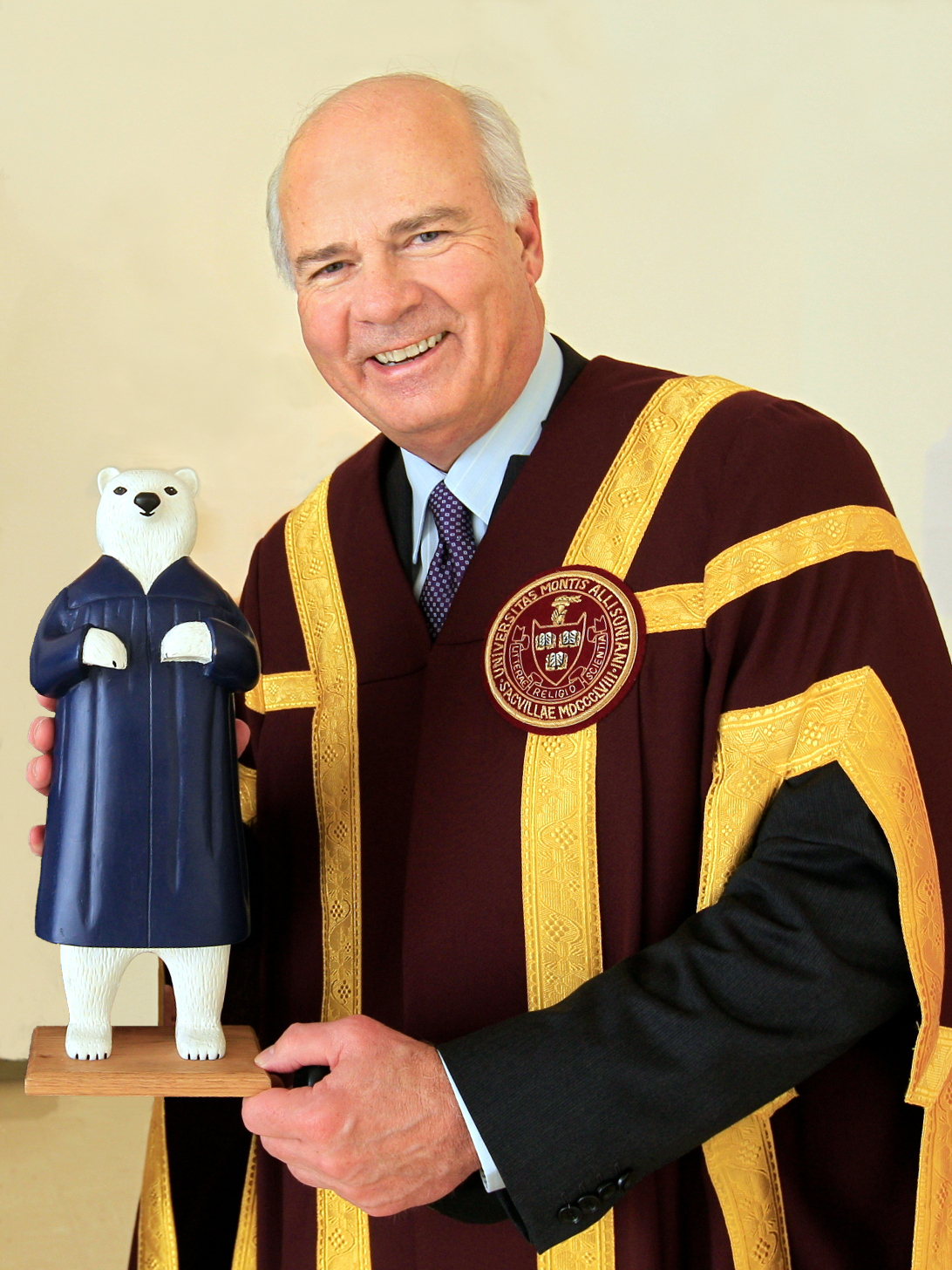
- Mansbridge at Mount Allison University in May 2011
- Born: July 6, 1948 (age 78); London, England
- Occupations: Journalist, news presenter
- Years active: 1968–2017
- Employer: Canadian Broadcasting Corporation
- Television: The National; Mansbridge One on One
- Spouses: Parm Dhillon (div. 1975); Wendy Mesley (m. 1989; div. 1992); Cynthia Dale (m. 1998)
- Children: 3
- Website: the bridge with Peter Mansbridge

Peter Mansbridge OC (born July 6, 1948) is an English-born Canadian retired news anchor. From 1988 to 2017, he was chief correspondent for CBC News and anchor of The National, CBC Television's flagship nightly newscast. He was also host of CBC News Network's Mansbridge One on One. Mansbridge has received many awards and accolades for his journalistic work, including an honorary doctorate from Mount Allison University, where he served as chancellor until the end of 2017. On September 5, 2016, the Canadian Broadcasting Corporation announced that Mansbridge would be stepping down as chief correspondent and anchor on July 1, 2017, after the coverage of Canada's 150th-anniversary celebrations. He is a Distinguished Fellow at the Munk School of Global Affairs and Public Policy at the University of Toronto.

== Early life ==
Mansbridge was born on July 6, 1948, in London, England. He and his siblings Paul and Wendy were the children of Stanley Harry Mansbridge, DFC (1918–2005), an RAF Wing Commander who worked as a civil servant in England, Malaya, and Canada; and Brenda Louise Mansbridge (née Harris-Jones, died 2008). His father received a Distinguished Flying Cross (DFC) medal for his service as a navigator aboard an Avro Lancaster bomber during World War II. His grandfather Sergeant Harry Frederick Mansbridge (1896-1969) was Canadian and a member of the Princess Patricia's Canadian Light Infantry. After moving to Ottawa, Ontario, Mansbridge attended high school at the Glebe Collegiate Institute, but dropped out or quit before graduating Grade 12 in 1966. He next served in the Royal Canadian Navy (RCN) in 1966 and 1967 as a Royal Canadian Navy Pilot Trainee (Venture Officer's Plan) but left because this two year RCN Officer training plan required everyone joining to be a high school graduate.

== Newscasting career ==
Mansbridge worked as a ticket agent for Transair at Churchill Airport in Churchill, Manitoba. In 1968, Mansbridge was discovered by Gaston Charpentier, a station manager for the local CBC radio station CHFC, when he heard Mansbridge making a flight announcement. Charpentier hired the 19-year-old Mansbridge as the host of CHFC's late night music program. In 1971, Mansbridge moved to Winnipeg to continue as a reporter for the CBW radio station and in the next year, he joined CBWT-TV as a reporter.

In 1975, Mansbridge became a reporter in Saskatchewan for the CBC's flagship evening news program The National. In 1976, he relocated to Ottawa to become parliamentary correspondent. Following a decade of political coverage, Mansbridge had become a substitute anchor for Knowlton Nash and in 1988, CBS offered him a job as a co-anchor for a morning show. To keep Mansbridge in Canada, Nash retired from his anchoring duties at the CBC.

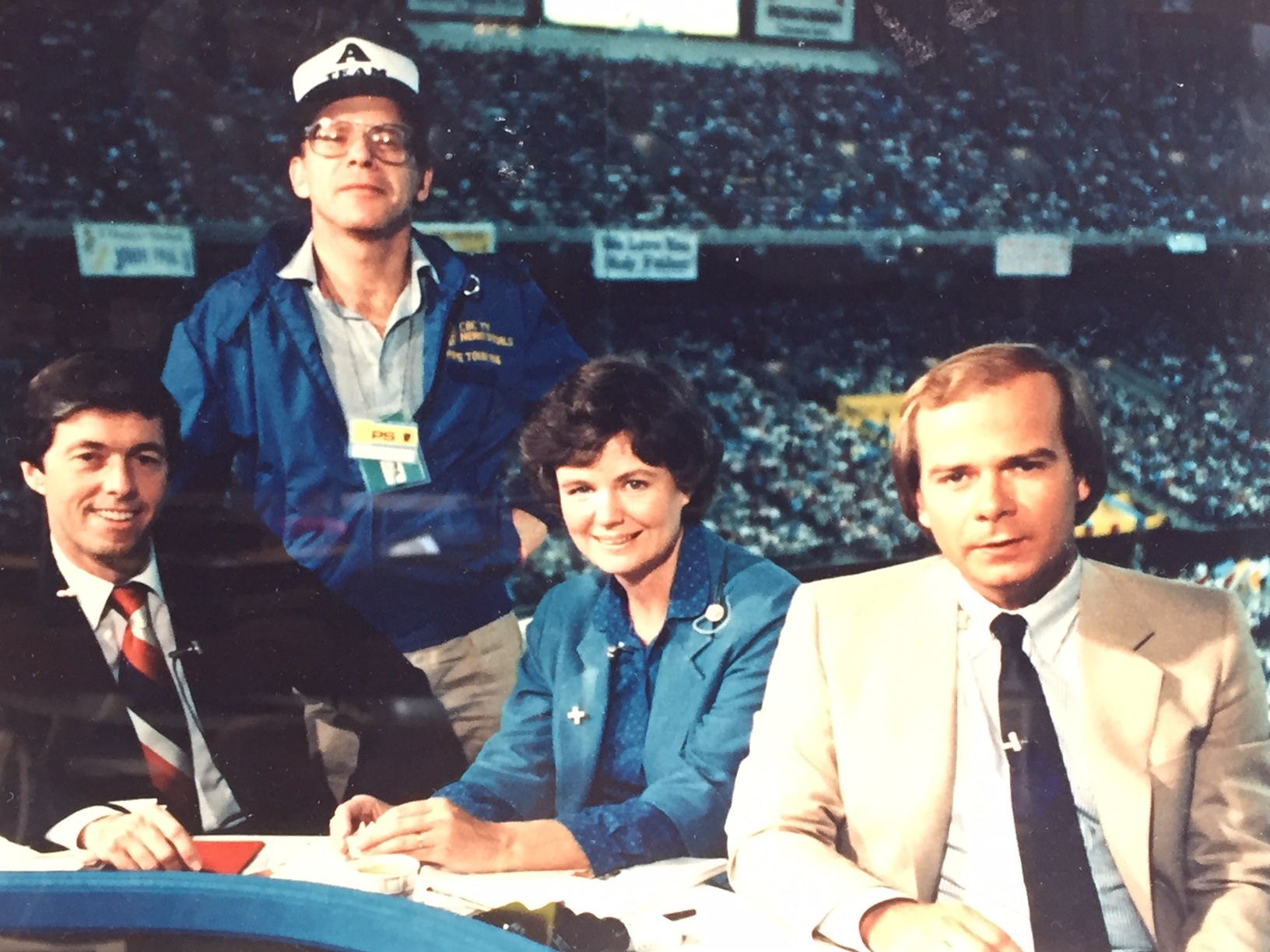
Mansbridge (right foreground) with CBC panelists and producers during Pope John Paul II's second Canadian tour in September 1984

Mansbridge was also the announcer of CBC News' This Week In Parliament (1981–1993), which was hosted by colleague Don Newman; Mansbridge provided the voice-over for the opening, intro, and ending of the program.

On May 2, 1988, Mansbridge debuted as the sole anchor of The National. In 1992 he became co-anchor with Pamela Wallin of CBC Prime Time News, which replaced The National as CBC Television's main network newscast; when the newscast reverted to the name The National in 1995, Mansbridge resumed his role as the program's sole anchor.

During his tenure as anchor, he covered Canadian news stories including federal elections, party leadership conventions, the Meech Lake Accord negotiations, the Charlottetown Accord and its referendum, the 1995 Quebec referendum, floods in Manitoba in 1997, ice storms in Ontario and Quebec in 1998, the six days in September 2000 that marked the death and state funeral of Pierre Trudeau, the 2003 blackout across much of Eastern North America and the death and state funeral of Jack Layton. His coverage of the blackout was notable because the normally clean-shaven Mansbridge had grown a beard during his summer hiatus (as he did every summer), and the news of the blackout broke with no time for him to shave. Thus, Canadian viewers saw a bearded Peter Mansbridge reporting on the events of that day.

He has also anchored coverage of many world events, both in the studio and on the scene. In the studio, he anchored coverage of the Gulf War, the War in Kosovo, the September 11 attacks and the 2014 Parliament Hill shootings. He was on the air live when the 2003 invasion of Iraq began and anchored coverage of it. On the scene, he anchored coverage of the fall of the Berlin Wall, the funerals of Diana, Princess of Wales and Pope John Paul II, numerous royal, papal, and US presidential visits to Canada, numerous Olympic Games, and the inauguration of US President Barack Obama. He reported extensively from Normandy both 50 and then 60 years after D-Day and from the United Kingdom and the Netherlands for the fiftieth anniversary of V-E Day. He also reported from the Netherlands for the sixtieth anniversary of V-E Day.

In 1999, he launched a new program, Mansbridge One on One, in which he interviewed newsmakers.

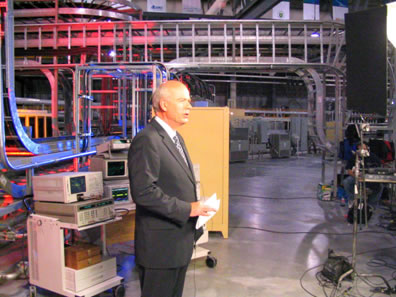
Mansbridge opens The National at the Canadian Light Source cyclotron, October 2004

With the retirement of Lloyd Robertson of CTV National News on September 1, 2011, Mansbridge became the longest-serving active anchor among the big three networks in Canada, as Dawna Friesen had taken over as anchor at Global National only in 2010. Lisa LaFlamme taking over for Robertson also meant that Mansbridge is the only male chief anchor among the big three English networks in Canada (Mansbridge, LaFlamme, and Friesen).

=== Controversies ===
==== Salary speculation ====
In 2011, Conservative Member of Parliament, Brent Rathgeber, had questions regarding the compensation of Peter Mansbridge and other CBC personalities. The former Canadian Heritage Minister, James Moore, stated that, while Mansbridge could disclose his salary on his own accord, the Canadian Government could not be compelled to do so. In 2014, the CBC provided a document to the Canadian Senate Committee on Transport and Communications indicating that Peter Mansbridge earned $80,000 per year. Later that year, CBC released additional documents to both the Senate and on its own webpage demonstrating that four CBC "on-air" employees earned more than $300,000 per year (the average salary of these four employees was $485,667 per year in 2014); while the CBC did not disclose the name of these employees, it was speculated that Peter Mansbridge was likely in this group of four. While the CBC still releases a Compensation Report online, it does not include prior years; however some screen captures of the 2014 compensation report were made available by media outlets. In 2016, an anonymous source revealed CBC internal documents to CANADALAND's Jesse Brown indicating Peter Mansbridge's salary, including additional remunerations on top of his base pay, was roughly $1.1 million per year for a number of years prior to 2014. Despite there being screen captures of Mansbridge's alleged employee file and salary numbers, Mansbridge has strongly denied the veracity of the $1.1 million per year salary figure.

==== Speaking fees controversy ====
In 2014, Mansbridge faced criticism for accepting speaking fees. Mansbridge defended himself saying he gave about 20 speeches each year, about half of them unpaid, and that he often donates part of the money to charity. However, he had recently made a paid speech at the Investment Symposium organized by the Canadian Association of Petroleum Producers (CAPP), a lobby group that promotes the pro-oil-sands-development side of the debate. Media critics felt accepting payment from an agency actively trying to influence public policy, even if it was only as a speaking fee, could be a conflict of interest. Mansbridge was the second CBC employee discovered to be accepting money from outside agencies for speaking fees. Rex Murphy of CBC's Cross Country Check-up was the first. CBC president Hubert Lacroix defended the practice stating that the CBC was aware of the speaking engagements and payments, having pre-vetted them for any potential conflict of interest. Nevertheless, the CBC reviewed its policies following the controversy. In 2016, anonymous insider sources from the CBC told CANADALAND that the CBC compensated Mansbridge for losing earnings from speaking fees; Mansbridge denies this claim.

=== Retirement ===
In 2016, Mansbridge announced his retirement from hosting The National, and step down as Chief Correspondent of CBC News after anchoring CBC's Canada Day coverage on the country's 150th anniversary. He made his final broadcast from The National on June 30, 2017; and made his final live coverage during Canada Day on July 1, 2017, paving the way for his retirement.

From October to December 2017, Mansbridge undertook a 17-stop cross-Canada storytelling tour.

Since his retirement, he made appearances in CBC including as guest co-host on CBC's coverage of the wedding of Prince Harry and Meghan Markle in May 2018, and as a guest contributor for the 2019 federal election. Since the 2019 federal election, Mansbridge has hosted a daily podcast called The Bridge.

Mansbridge had a voice cameo in the 2016 Walt Disney Animation Studios film Zootopia as "Peter Moosebridge," an anthropomorphic moose news anchor and reprised the role again in Zootopia 2. Ahead of his final broadcast in 2017, a space in the Canadian Broadcasting Centre in Toronto was renamed as Mansbridge Hall in his honor.

== Personal life ==
Mansbridge has been married three times. His previous marriage to CBC colleague Wendy Mesley (January 6, 1989 – 1992) became regular tabloid fodder in Frank magazine as their marriage ended. He has been married to Canadian actress Cynthia Dale since November 14, 1998, and they have a son, William, born in 1999. Mansbridge has two daughters from a first marriage to Parm Dhillon, which ended in 1975. He lives in Stratford, Ontario with his family, and also has a summer cottage in the Gatineau Hills.

Among his hobbies, Mansbridge collects small mementos from his travels around the world, including rocks, soil and other "sentimental" items from various prominent historical places. He kept pebbles from a visit to the Battle of Dieppe site in France, dirt from Vimy Ridge, and sand from the beaches at Normandy, as well as pieces of the Berlin Wall and the Great Wall of China. A silver bracelet was bought on his trip to South Africa for Nelson Mandela's funeral, which is engraved only with the numerals "46664" — Mandela's prisoner number on Robben Island.

Mansbridge was and is also an avid and longtime fan of the original Winnipeg Jets and the current Winnipeg Jets, having attended the signing of Bobby Hull in 1972 while working as a reporter for CBWT. Mansbridge's past public support for both Jets franchises – including use of his Twitter account – is often seen as a humorous contrast to his balanced reporting style. To underline this image, Mansbridge is also known to occasionally make jokes at the expense of the Toronto Maple Leafs. Nonetheless, he continues to support his childhood Maple Leafs in a secondary capacity.

== Awards and honorary degrees ==
Mansbridge has won several honours throughout his career, including 13 Gemini awards. In 2008, he was made an Officer of the Order of Canada, the second grade of nation's second highest civilian honour. In that capacity, the Queen Elizabeth II Diamond Jubilee Medal was also conferred upon him in 2012.

Peter Mansbridge has received a number of honorary degrees; these include:

- 1989: Lakehead University, Doctor of Humane Letters (DHL)
- 1996: Mount Royal University, Bachelor of Applied Communications (Journalism)
- 1999: Mount Allison University, Doctor of Laws (LL.D)
- 2001: University of Manitoba, Doctor of Laws (LL.D)
- 2005: Ryerson University, Doctor of Journalism
- 2008: University of Western Ontario, Doctor of Laws (LL.D)
- 2010: University of Windsor, Doctor of Laws (LL.D)
- 2011: York University, Doctor of Laws (LL.D)
- 2014: Carleton University, Doctor of Laws (LL.D)
- 2017: University of Calgary, Doctor of Laws (LL.D)
- 2017: McMaster University, Doctor of Laws (LL.D)
- 2017: University of Toronto, Doctor of Laws (LL.D)

Academic offices
| Preceded by John Bragg | Chancellor of Mount Allison University; 2009–2017 | Succeeded by Lynn Loewen |
Media offices
| Preceded by Knowlton Nash | Chief Correspondent for CBC News; 1988–2017 | Succeeded by Adrienne Arsenault |
| Preceded by Knowlton Nash | Anchor of The National; 1988–1992; Served alongside: Pamela Wallin (1992–1995) and Hana Gartner (1995) of CBC Prime Time News (1992–1995) | Succeeded by Alison Smith |
| Preceded by Alison Smith | Anchor of The National; 1995–2017 | Succeeded by Adrienne Arsenault, Rosemary Barton, Andrew Chang & Ian Hanomansing |
