= CPAC (TV channel) =

Canadian parliamentary broadcaster

- Country: Canada
- Broadcast area: Nationwide
- Headquarters: Ottawa, Ontario

Programming
- Languages: English, French
- Picture format: 1080i HDTV (downscaled to letterboxed 480i for the SDTV feed)

Ownership
- Owner: Rogers Communications (66.75%); Vidéotron (21.81%); Cogeco (6.73%); Eastlink (3.77%); Access Communications (0.92%); Vecima Networks (0.02%)

History
- Launched: October 1992; 33 years ago
- Replaced: CBC Parliamentary Television Network
- Former names: Canadian Parliamentary Channel (CPaC)

Links
- Website: www.cpac.ca/en

The Cable Public Affairs Channel (French: La Chaîne d'affaires publiques par câble), better known by its acronym CPAC (/ˈsiːpæk/ SEE-pak), is a Canadian specialty television channel owned by a consortium consisting of Rogers Communications, Vidéotron, Cogeco, Eastlink, and Access Communications. The channel is devoted to coverage of public and government affairs, including carrying a full, uninterrupted feed of proceedings of the House of Commons of Canada, with three audio channels, one untreated feed and, with the assistance of interpreters, one in each of the official languages.

== Synopsis ==
CPAC's main purpose is the broadcast of proceedings of the House of Commons. Other programming includes meetings of The House of Commons and Senate of Canada parliamentary committees, occasional Supreme Court proceedings, political conventions, conferences, committees and coverage of general elections. CPAC also airs the proceedings of certain Royal Commissions and judicial enquiries.

CPAC is similar to services in other countries including C-SPAN (United States), EuroparlTV (European Union), La Chaîne parlementaire (France), Phoenix (Germany), BBC Parliament (United Kingdom), Arutz HaKnesset (Israel) and TV Câmara and TV Senado (Brazil), some of which (particularly C-SPAN) occasionally supply programming to CPAC.

== History ==
Television broadcasting of the proceedings of the House of Commons began in 1977 after a motion approving it was adopted by the House, with broadcasts commencing in October of that year. The Canadian Radio-television and Telecommunications Commission (CRTC) allowed cable companies to carry the broadcasts on their specialty channels as an interim measure. In 1979, the Canadian Broadcasting Corporation was given a temporary network licence to begin live coverage of the proceedings (which had been airing on a tape delayed basis until then), leading to the creation of the CBC Parliamentary Television Network. A permanent licence was granted to the CBC the next year.

Original logo used from 1992 to 1996

In 1989, the CBC and a consortium of cable television providers made a joint proposal for the creation of a new entity, the Canadian Parliamentary Channel (CPaC) that would carry the proceedings of the House of Commons and committees, along with proceedings of royal commissions, enquiries, court hearings and provincial legislatures, and public affairs programming. A review of parliamentary broadcasting resulted but the CPaC proposal was not acted upon.

In December 1990, the CBC announced that as a result of budget cuts the CBC "is no longer able to bear the cost of operating the English- and French-language parliamentary channels. The government will seek the views of the Speaker of the House and consider means of maintaining the service." The CBC announced that it was discontinuing its role as the parliamentary broadcaster effective April 1, 1991. As an interim measure, the House of Commons' Board of Internal Economy negotiated a temporary contract with the CBC to provide parliamentary coverage for an additional year while the Board considered proposals to take over the service. In 1992, the Board came to an agreement with Canadian Parliamentary Channel, Inc., a consortium of 25 cable companies, to take over the CBC's role; the new service received its licence from the CRTC in 1993.

Second CPAC logo used from 1996 to 2001

While the Canadian Parliamentary Channel's name was soon changed to Cable Public Affairs Channel to reflect the greater diversity of programming and the cable industry's ownership of the service, the ownership structure continues today. The shareholders of Cable Public Affairs Channel Inc. are cable companies Rogers Communications (66.75%), Vidéotron (21.81%), Cogeco (6.73%), Eastlink (3.77%), and Access Communications (0.92%), with a small stake held by technology company Vecima Networks (0.02%).

To date there have been few, if any, accusations of influence by these cable companies on CPAC's editorial policy. Indeed, some CPAC promotions (featuring Tom Green) have claimed that because it is owned by the cable industry, "not the government", it is more independent than other broadcasters, such as the national public broadcaster CBC, which also provide extensive political coverage through various outlets.

During federal election campaigns, the network frequently airs Campaign Politics, a documentary series in which each episode profiles one individual electoral district through interviews with candidates and voters.

=== Choice of feeds ===
Logo used from 2001 to 2016

In 2003, at the behest of the Canadian Radio-television and Telecommunications Commission (CRTC), CPAC and its carriers started to allow television viewers to choose which language they can hear the service in, putting the feed of one language on the service's main audio channel and the feed of the other language on its second audio program channel. Some cable systems also offer the two feeds on separate channels for easier access. CPAC has also offered a "floor" feed, a feed that does not carry any simultaneous translation, although due to the changes noted above, it may not remain in use over cable or satellite television. A choice between all three feeds are offered on CPAC's free Internet video stream available on the channel's website.

=== Senate proceedings ===
Logo used from 2016 to 2021

Proceedings of the Senate were historically not carried as the upper house had not agreed to allow its sessions to be televised. Then, on 25 April 2006, Senator Hugh Segal moved that the proceedings of the Senate be televised. The motion was referred to the Senate Standing Committee on Rules, Procedures and the Rights of Parliament for consideration; although the motion was approved, broadcast of senate proceedings was not launched at that time apart from selected committee meetings. Full broadcast of Senate proceedings launched for the first time on 18 March 2019, concurrently with the Senate's temporary relocation to the Government Conference Centre.

=== Non-political programming ===
From February 12 to 28, 2010, CPAC simulcasted the V network's coverage of the 2010 Winter Olympics. V (since renamed Noovo) does not have wide availability outside Quebec, unlike previous rightsholder Radio-Canada or even rival private network TVA. This had caused some concern with francophone groups outside Quebec, thus, CPAC was chosen because of its mandatory carriage on the basic service of all cable and satellite providers, as well as the fact that the House of Commons was not sitting during the games. Although CPAC's conditions of licence do not normally permit the channel to air sports, it received special authorization from the CRTC to permit this simulcast.

Since 2009, CPAC has also had the authority to carry entertainment programming on July 1 in order to cover Canada Day celebrations on Parliament Hill or elsewhere.

== On-air staff ==
Past and present hosts associated with the channel have included:

- Esther Bégin
- Catherine Clark
- Marc-André Cossette
- Omayra Issa
- Dale Goldhawk
- L. Ian MacDonald
- Ken Rockburn
- Michael Serapio
- Alison Smith
- Martin Stringer
- Mark Sutcliffe
- Peter Van Dusen
- Paul Wells
