= CBC2 =

CBC2 may be:

- CBC Radio 2, FM radio network in Canada
- CBC-2, a proposed (but never aired) second English-language Canadian TV service that was to be operated by the Canadian Broadcasting Corporation
- Ford Bay Airport, CBC2 ICAO airport code, in the Northwest Territories, Canada
