= Canadian Broadcasting Corp v Canada (Labour Relations Board) =

- Supreme Court of Canada

Hearing: March 14, 1994 Judgment: January 27, 1995
- Full case name: Canadian Broadcasting Corporation v. Canada Labour Relations Board and Alliance of Canadian Cinema, Television and Radio Artists
- Citations: [1995] 1 S.C.R. 157
- Docket No.: 23142
- Prior history: Judgment against the Canadian Broadcasting Corporation in the Federal Court of Appeal
- Ruling: Appeal dismissed

Holding
- The standard of review of a Canada Labour Relations Board decision regarding labour practices is one of "patent unreasonableness".; An administrative tribunal's decision that interprets external legislation does not automatically mean the standard of review becomes "correctness", if the decision is one that would otherwise be within the tribunal's jurisdiction.

Court membership
- Chief Justice: Antonio Lamer; Puisne Justices: Gérard La Forest, Claire L'Heureux-Dubé, John Sopinka, Charles Gonthier, Peter Cory, Beverley McLachlin, Frank Iacobucci, John C. Major

Reasons given
- Majority: Iacobucci (paras. 1–87), joined by Lamer, Cory, and Major
- Concurrence: La Forest (para. 88)
- Concurrence: L'Heureux‑Dubé (paras. 89–93)
- Concurrence: Sopinka (paras. 94–98)
- Concurrence: Gonthier (para. 99)
- Dissent: McLachlin (paras. 100–136)

Canadian Broadcasting Corp v Canada (Labour Relations Board), [1995] 1 S.C.R. 157 is a leading decision of the Supreme Court of Canada on judicial review. The decision affirms the "pragmatic and functional approach" to labour relations and rules that the standard of review for interpreting external legislation should usually be one of correctness.

== Background ==
Dale Goldhawk was a host of CBC Radio's Cross Country Checkup and president of the Alliance of Canadian Cinema, Television and Radio Artists (ACTRA). During the federal election, Goldhawk was an outspoken opponent of the North American Free Trade Agreement and free trade. He wrote an article in the union's newspaper that was highly critical of free trade. The Canadian Broadcasting Corporation (CBC) found his conduct unacceptable as he was both a host and president. The CBC asked that he chose either to leave one of his two positions. He chose to step down as president and remain a host.

The union filed a complaint against the CBC for interference with the administration of the union's business which was prohibited under the Canada Labour Code. The board considered the issue of whether Goldhawk's conduct was protected by the code. They found that it was and that the CBC violated the code. It was reasoned that the article was directed at the union and so was protected under the code.

The Federal Court of Appeal held that the standard of review was patent unreasonableness and found that on the facts the board decision was not patently unreasonable.

The issue before the Supreme Court was the decision of the board was a question of jurisdiction, which would set a standard of review of correctness, and whether a different standard of review should be applied to external statutes such as the Canada Labour Code.

== Decision of the court ==
Justice Iacobucci, writing for the majority, dismissed the appeal.

== See also ==
- List of Supreme Court of Canada cases
