= Keith Boag =

Canadian journalist

Keith Boag is a retired Canadian journalist.

Until 2018, he worked with The National as the chief political correspondent, CBC News: Sunday and other current affairs programs, as chief political correspondent, based in Ottawa, Ontario.

While in Ottawa Boag analyzed Canadian political affairs, and studies polls and news developments in brief interviews with news anchor Peter Mansbridge. He occasionally created feature reports.

Boag first joined CBC in 1983 as a reporter in Fredericton, New Brunswick. Two years later, he moved to the newsroom in Montreal, Quebec. In 1987, he joined network news in Toronto, Ontario and one year later became national reporter for the CBC in British Columbia. In 1995, he became foreign correspondent in Washington, D.C. then moved to South Africa before returning to Canada in 1999. Born in Montreal, he has a degree in history from McGill University and completed a graduate program in journalism at Carleton University.

Boag was reassigned by the CBC as a correspondent in Los Angeles, as part of the changing of the guard in their Ottawa bureau. Boag returned to Washington as correspondent in 2012.
