= Phone-sync =

A phone-sync (also known as a tape-sync, a simul-rec, or a double-ender) was a technique used to conduct televised interviews over long distances in the 1980s before satellite television became commonplace, in order to provide video to what would otherwise be an audio-only interview. It was commonplace in such news programs as The Journal on CBC Television.

A standard Tape sync works as follows: an interviewer, usually in a television studio, is videotaped conducting an interview via a long-distance phone call to the interviewee in another part of the world. This interviewee, often in a studio in front of a background representing the city in which he or she is located, is videotaped as he or she participates in the interview. The two videotapes are then sent to the interviewer's production team to be synchronized through video editing. Cuts between shots of the interviewer and interviewee are made accordingly, and the higher-quality sound of the videotapes are used instead of the telephone audio. For effect, the interviewer may be taped looking into a bluescreen or greenscreen, into which the video of the interviewee would at this point be resized if necessary and inserted using chroma key.

The double-ender technique has become much less commonplace with the proliferation of live satellite television feeds and video over Internet (Skype, etc.), but is still used today when such technology is not available.

The double-ender technique can also be done with audio-only mediums, such as radio or podcasting. Syndicated radio show interviews are often done as a double-ender, with the host in their studio, and the guests recording in their own city, in the studio of their local affiliate.

Double-ender audio interviews have become more common with the rise in popularity of podcasting. The result is a cast that sounds like the hosts and guests are in the same room, when they're actually in different cities.
