= The Journal (Canadian TV program) =

Canadian television show

- Presented by: Barbara Frum; Mary Lou Finlay
- Country of origin: Canada
- Original language: English
- No. of episodes: 2772

Production
- Executive producer: Mark Starowicz
- Running time: 38 minutes

Original release
- Network: CBC
- Release: January 11, 1982 – October 30, 1992

The Journal is a current affairs newsmagazine television program broadcast on CBC Television from 1982 to 1992. It aired weeknights at 10:22 pm, following The National at 10 pm, and expanding on stories presented on there with in-depth interviews, documentaries, and televised "town hall" meetings. The division of the 10:00 hour into two entirely separate programs, and the length of each, reflect the separation and political tension between the CBC's then-separate news and public affairs production units.

The program premiered on January 11, 1982. In its first season, it was hosted by Barbara Frum and Mary Lou Finlay, and was the first network news program in the world hosted by two women without a male co-anchor. However, after the first season Frum became the program's sole host, although Finlay remained with the program as a reporter and documentary producer. Frum anchored on her own until her death in 1992. The program was produced for its entire run by Mark Starowicz, who had produced As It Happens for CBC Radio, which also featured Frum. Guest hosts when Frum was absent from The Journal included Bill Cameron, Peter Kent, Keith Morrison, Lyn Whitham and Brian Stewart.

Interviews were generally conducted in the early years of the program using a technique known as the double-ender, wherein guests were interviewed earlier in the day on videotape and later presented as live using a split screen. As satellite television technology progressed and became more commonplace, interviews were instead conducted using satellite uplinks.

Beginning in the late 1980s, Friday night's edition of The Journal was frequently given over to arts and literature, under the rubric Friday Night Arts. The Friday arts program was anchored by Daniel Richler or David Gilmour. At other times, an entire show—or even, in one case, an entire week of shows—would be devoted to a single topic, usually in the form of the "full-edition documentary"; documentary topics ranged from the serious (aboriginal land claims and the Oka crisis) to the mundane (a 30-minute exposé on feet). One of the most memorable documentaries was a two-part travelogue by Allen Abel driving from Budapest to Bucharest two days after the fall of the Ceauşescu regime in Romania.

The Journal was based on CBC Winnipeg's successful suppertime program, 24Hours. It also bore many similarities in its format to the American program Nightline which premiered three years earlier, in 1979.

== Cancellation ==
Following Frum's death in 1992, and with plans underway to move their daily news and current affairs hour to 9 pm, the CBC chose to also revamp its entire approach to TV news programming. In the fall of 1992, CBC Prime Time News debuted with Peter Mansbridge and Pamela Wallin as equal cohosts of a package that mixed news and Journal-type features into a single program. That format lasted only two years before reverting to the old National/Journal format, although the name Prime Time News persisted for another year. When the news program returned to the name The National in 1995, the current affairs program became The National Magazine. This subsequently was renamed The Magazine. It was again reintegrated into the first half news program, as The National, in 2001.
