= Who Wants to Be a Millionaire: Canadian Edition =

- Logo
- Also known as: Millionaire: Canadian Edition
- Genre: Game show
- Presented by: Pamela Wallin
- Country of origin: Canada
- Original language: English
- No. of seasons: 1
- No. of episodes: 2

Production
- Production locations: ABC Television Center; New York, New York
- Running time: 39–48 minutes
- Production companies: Celador; Valleycrest Productions; Buena Vista Television

Original release
- Network: CTV
- Release: September 13 – September 14, 2000

Related
- Who Wants to Be a Millionaire (U.S.); Who Wants to Be a Millionaire? (UK)

Who Wants to Be a Millionaire: Canadian Edition is a Canadian game show based on the British format of Who Wants to Be a Millionaire? and taped on the set of the American version of that show in New York City, which aired on ABC. A Canadian audience was flown to New York City so the contestants could "ask the audience" for help on the Canadian-themed questions. Following the airing of the two specials, CTV did announce that additional episodes of the Canadian Edition would be produced, but they never came to fruition. The series was hosted by Pamela Wallin.

The Canadian version aired on CTV on September 13 and 14, 2000.

== Gameplay ==
Payout structure
Question number	Question value
15	$1,000,000
14	$500,000
13	$250,000
12	$125,000
11	$64,000
10	$32,000
9	$16,000
8	$8,000
7	$4,000
6	$2,000
5	$1,000
4	$500
3	$300
2	$200
1	$100
Milestone Top prize

As in the United Kingdom and the United States, contestants tried to answer 15 multiple-choice questions to win CA$1,000,000 (US$797,802) with three lifelines (50:50, Phone-A-Friend, and Ask The Audience) to help them. Contestants were guaranteed $1,000 for correctly answering the fifth question, and $32,000 for the tenth.

Bill Shizas was the first contestant on the Canadian show. He won $1,000 after answering his $8,000 question incorrectly.

The biggest winner during the show's run was François Dominic Laramée, a writer from Verdun, Quebec. He won $64,000.

== See also ==
- International versions of Millionaire
