= John Warren (journalist) =

Canadian journalist

John Warren (born 1937) is a retired journalist and the English language anchor of the CBC Parliamentary Television Network from 1979 to 1992. In the 1980s and 1990s he wrote a weekly column for the Ottawa Citizen newspaper called Commons Sense. Prior to his role as host of the Parliamentary Television Network, he was a CBC radio and television reporter.

Warren was elected president of the Canadian Parliamentary Press Gallery in 1977 and served as President of the National Press Club in 1986.

He graduated from Carleton University with a B.J. degree in 1960. His career in journalism began with the Saskatoon Star-Phoenix in 1958 after which he moved on to the Edmonton Journal, and later the Canadian Press. He spent a year as chairman of the journalism department at Mount Royal College in Calgary before joining the Canadian Broadcasting Corporation in 1965.

With CBC, Warren served as a reporter in Edmonton, Calgary and Regina before his posting to Parliament Hill in 1971. During his service in Edmonton he was elected president of the Alberta Legislature Press Gallery. He held a similar post in the Saskatchewan Legislature Press Gallery while in Regina.

With Robert Fife, he co-authored the best-selling book, A Capital Scandal in 1991. It exposed many of the lavish and little-known perqs and privileges enjoyed by MPs and Senators. He was suspended between October 1991 and January 1992 by the CBC, based on fears that he would promote his book on-air.

John Warren is the father of Gregory, Steven, Ken and Adrienne and grandfather of four girls. He enjoys extensive volunteer work in a healthy retirement life divided between Ottawa and an historic home near Prescott on the St. Lawrence River.
