= Pamela Wallin =

Canadian senator and television journalist

The Honourable Pamela Wallin OC SOM
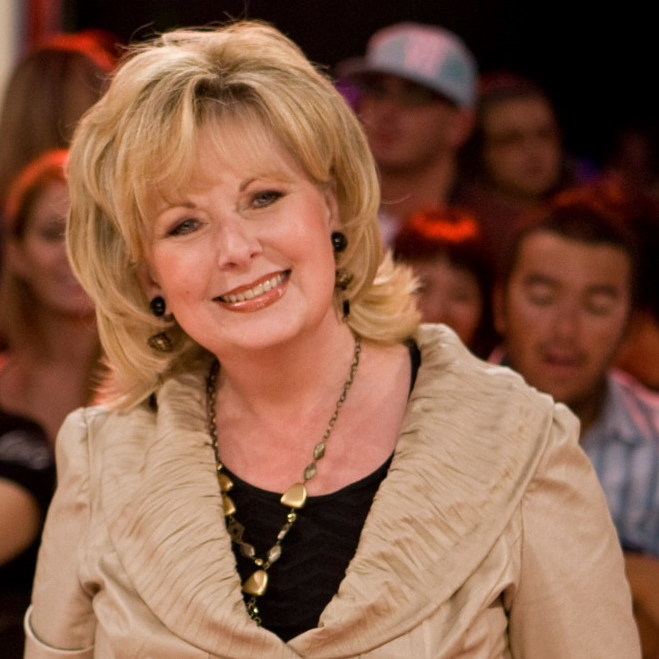
- Wallin in 2008

Canadian Senator from Saskatchewan
- In office January 2, 2009 – October 18, 2026
- Nominated by: Stephen Harper
- Appointed by: Michaëlle Jean

Personal details
- Born: April 10, 1953 (age 73) Moose Jaw, Saskatchewan, Canada
- Party: Canadian Senators Group (since 2019)
- Other political affiliations: Independent Senators Group (2016–2019); Independent Conservative (2013–2016); Conservative (2009–2013); New Democratic (1970s)
- Occupation: Journalist; diplomat; corporate board member

Pamela Wallin OC SOM (born April 10, 1953) is a Canadian politician, former journalist, diplomat and former Canadian Senator, serving from 2009 to 2026.

== Early life and career ==
Wallin was born in Moose Jaw, Saskatchewan, and is of Swedish descent. Wallin spent much of her formative years in Wadena but completed her high school in Moose Jaw. In 1973, she graduated with a degree in psychology and political science from the University of Saskatchewan, Regina Campus (now the University of Regina) and began her career as an officer at the Saskatchewan Federal Penitentiary. Politically, she was a member of The Waffle, a left-wing faction in the New Democratic Party that existed in the early to mid-1970s.

== Journalism ==
In 1974, she began her career in journalism, joining CBC Radio's news division. In 1978, she joined the Ottawa bureau of the Toronto Star where she remained for two years. In 1980 she joined CTV and became cohost, with Norm Perry, of Canada AM. In 1985, CTV named her its Ottawa bureau chief. She later rejoined Canada AM, hosting alongside J. D. Roberts.

In 1992, CBC Television hired Wallin in a highly publicized move. For many years, The National had been followed by a 40-minute nightly newsmagazine hosted by Barbara Frum, called The Journal. However, as a result of Frum's death in March 1992, the CBC wanted to revamp and reposition its entire approach to news programming.

In the fall of that year, Wallin and Peter Mansbridge debuted as the co-hosts of Prime Time News. Instead of Mansbridge reading the news on The National, followed by Frum introducing documentary and current affairs features and interviewing newsmakers on The Journal, the new show integrated the two former programs and featured Wallin and Mansbridge as equal co-hosts of the entire package. As well, the new show aired at 9 p.m., one hour earlier than the old National/Journal tandem.

The show fared poorly in the ratings and by 1994 had returned to its old format and time slot, with Mansbridge reading the news, followed by Wallin hosting a magazine segment which eventually took on the name The National Magazine. In April 1995, Wallin was dropped as host of The Magazine, and was succeeded in June by Hana Gartner.

Following her dismissal from CBC News, Wallin briefly returned to CTV as part of its coverage of the 1995 provincial election in Ontario, but did not rejoin the company permanently. Instead, she created her own production company, Pamela Wallin Productions, and launched a daily interview series called Pamela Wallin Live in 1995. Airing on CBC Newsworld and, in some years, on the CBC's main network as well, Pamela Wallin Live was a highly successful series which featured Wallin interviewing newsmakers, celebrities and other interesting personalities in a manner similar to CNN's Larry King Live. The show ran for four years before Wallin moved to the cable network TalkTV.

In 2000, Wallin hosted the Canadian edition of Who Wants to Be a Millionaire?.

Wallin has also published two books, Since You Asked (ISBN 978-0679310082) and Speaking of Success (ISBN 1552633705), and has made cameo appearances on the Canadian comedy series Royal Canadian Air Farce and Corner Gas.

== Diplomatic and academic appointments ==
In 2001, Wallin, along with Foreign Affairs Minister John Manley, was one of the organizers of the "Canada Loves New York" rally for Canadians to show their support after the September 11 attacks (Manley ran in the New York City Marathon in 2001, a contributing factor in the organization of the rally).

On June 25, 2002, Wallin's television career came to an end when Canadian prime minister Jean Chrétien advised Governor General Adrienne Clarkson to appoint Wallin to a four-year term as Canada's consul general in New York City, her first diplomatic posting. In 2003, Wallin and Senator Jerry Grafstein were honoured by the Canadian Society of New York for their ongoing commitment to strengthening the ties between Canada and the United States. In 2006, she became a senior advisor to the president of the Americas Society and the Council of the Americas in New York.

One of the perquisites of the post of Consul General was an official residence on Park Avenue. In 2005, shortly before her term ended, Wallin bought a 500 square feet (46 m^{2}) apartment for US$379,000.

In March 2007, she was appointed the seventh chancellor of the University of Guelph and was installed in June. She sat on the Panel on Canada's Future Role in Afghanistan, chaired by Manley, a former cabinet minister.

She was also appointed by the governor general as an honorary colonel of the Royal Canadian Air Force.

== Corporate boards ==
In 2006, Wallin was appointed to the board of Bell Globemedia, owners of The Globe and Mail and CTV Inc. From 2007 to 2011 she served on the board of Oilsands Quest, Inc. and has also served on the board of Gluskin Sheff & Associates, Inc., an investment and wealth management firm and as a member of the advisory board of BMO Harris Bank. In 2013, as a result of the Senate expense claims scandal she was embroiled in, Wallin resigned from all three paid positions she held outside of the Senate: as a director of Gluskin Sheff & Associates, a wealth management firm, in May 2013, the board of Porter Airlines in June 2013 after having been on the board since 2008, and the board of the Ideas Council.

== Canadian Senate ==
On January 2, 2009, Wallin was appointed to the Senate of Canada on the advice of Prime Minister Stephen Harper, representing Saskatchewan.

Initially a member of the Conservative Senate Caucus, Wallin sat as an independent following her departure from the caucus in 2013. She joined the Independent Senators Group in 2017. On November 4, 2019, she joined the Canadian Senators Group, with which she remained affiliated until her resignation in 2026.

=== Residency and travel expense controversy ===
Wallin was among the senators investigated during the Canadian Senate expenses scandal that began in 2013. An audit found that approximately $140,000 of the $500,000 in travel expenses she had claimed were improper, including expenses related to her positions on corporate boards.

On May 17, 2013, Wallin left the Conservative Senate Caucus while an audit of her expense claims was underway. Wallin apologized for mistakes in her expense filings, which she attributed to carelessness rather than deliberate misuse of Senate funds. She reimbursed the Senate $38,369 following her own review of her expenses, followed by an additional $114,538, including interest, in September 2013.

On November 5, 2013, the Senate voted to suspend Wallin without pay for the remainder of the 41st Canadian Parliament over her expense claims. Her suspension ended with the dissolution of Parliament for the 2015 Canadian federal election, and she subsequently resumed her Senate duties. In May 2016, the Royal Canadian Mounted Police announced that no criminal charges would be laid against Wallin following its investigation of her expenses.

In an October 2026 interview, Wallin declined to revisit the controversy but acknowledged that reforms introduced following the expenses scandal had been necessary.

=== Resignation ===
Wallin resigned from the Senate effective October 18, 2026, after nearly 17 years of service and approximately two years before reaching the mandatory retirement age of 75. In an interview with The Canadian Press the following day, she described the decision as personal, saying that it "just felt like the right time" to leave.

Wallin said that the federal government's announcement of plans to permit advance requests for medical assistance in dying in Canada (MAID) had provided a sense of closure. She had long advocated for advance requests after witnessing her mother's prolonged struggle with Alzheimer's disease and had served on parliamentary committees examining assisted dying legislation.

Reflecting on her Senate career, Wallin defended the institution as an important check on the House of Commons, while arguing that provincial governments should have greater influence over the appointment of senators.

== Personal life ==
Wallin is divorced. She was diagnosed with colorectal cancer in 2001.

== Honours ==
In 1994, her home town of Wadena, Saskatchewan named its major street Pamela Wallin Drive in her honour. In 1999, she was inducted into the Saskatchewan Order of Merit, and in 2007 was made an Officer of the Order of Canada. In 2008, Toastmasters International announced that Wallin would be that year's winner of their Golden Gavel award.

Wallin has received 14 honorary degrees, including from Athabasca University, the University of Lethbridge and the University of Windsor.

Academic offices
Preceded by Lincoln Alexander	Chancellor of the University of Guelph; 2007–2011	Succeeded by David Mirvish
