= Kelly Crowe =

Canadian television journalist

Kelly Crowe is a Canadian television journalist, and medical sciences correspondent for CBC Television's The National. Crowe joined The National in 1991. Before joining CBC, Crowe worked for several years in private television and radio. She came to The National from CBLT in Toronto where she had been a regional correspondent since 1988.

== Biography ==
Crowe grew up in the small Ontario town of Harriston. Completed high school at Norwell District Secondary School in Palmerston. Attended Carleton University in Ottawa in the 1980s. Her journalism career began in Yarmouth, Nova Scotia. She has covered a wide variety of subjects in her reporting, including elections, floods, forest fires, political leadership conventions and breaking news events such as the Columbine shootings in Colorado in 1999 and the SARS outbreak in Canada in 2003.

As a CBC National correspondent Crowe's first assignment was in the Saskatchewan bureau. She then spent six years in Alberta before returning to Toronto as a current affairs documentary reporter. One of Crowe's documentaries followed an Afghan theatre troop touring the war-ravaged country. In other documentaries she has been embedded with the Canadian military for sovereignty exercises in Canada's North, and has followed a Canadian wolf pack that had been re-established in Yellowstone National Park. Her current assignment is medical sciences correspondent for The National.
