= Roy Peterson =

Canadian editorial cartoonist

- Born: Roy Eric Peterson; 14 September 1936 Winnipeg, Manitoba, Canada
- Died: 30 September 2013 (aged 77) West Vancouver, British Columbia, Canada
- Area: Cartoonist
- Awards: Officer of the Order of Canada; National Newspaper Awards, seven times

Roy Eric Peterson, OC (14 September 1936 – 30 September 2013) was a Canadian editorial cartoonist who drew for The Vancouver Sun from 1962 to 2009.

== Biography ==
Peterson was born in Winnipeg and studied in Vancouver at the Kitsilano Secondary School and the Vancouver School of Art. Along with the Sun, his work often appeared in Maclean's magazine, where he would illustrate the columns of Allan Fotheringham. He has also illustrated the covers of many of Fotheringham's books.

The Vancouver Sun laid off Peterson in 2009.

Peterson died in West Vancouver, British Columbia, Canada, on 30 September 2013, aged 77, of complications from Parkinson's disease. He was survived by five children and nine grandchildren. His longtime wife, Margaret, had predeceased him in 2004.

== Awards ==
In 2004 he was made an Officer of the Order of Canada and Peterson won seven National Newspaper Awards for his work, the most in the history of the awards.

== Bibliography ==
- Drawn and Quartered: the Trudeau Years (Key Porter Books, 1984) - containing cartoons drawn during the administration of Pierre Elliott Trudeau, with commentary by Peter C. Newman
- The World According to Roy Peterson (Douglas & McIntyre, 1979) containing selected cartoons from the 1970s, with commentary by Alan Fotheringham
- The Canadian ABC Book, (Hurting, c.1977), a children's book of the alphabet with a Canadian focus
- The Day of the Glorious Revolution (Lorimer, 1974) — collaboration with Stanley Burke
- Frog Fables and Beaver Tales (Lorimer, 1973) — a children's book collaboration with Stanley Burke
