= Dale Goldhawk =

- Born: Dale Goldhawk; 1942 or 1943 (age 83–84)
- Education: Ryerson Polytechnical Institute (1967)
- Occupations: Canadian broadcaster, investigative reporter

Dale Goldhawk (born 1942 or 1943) is a Canadian broadcaster, journalist, and investigative reporter.

Goldhawk graduated from the journalism program at Ryerson Polytechnical Institute in 1967 and began his career as a reporter for the Toronto Telegram. He moved to radio station CHIC in 1971 where he served as news director. In 1974 he moved to television as a reporter for the fledgling Global Television Network. In 1980, he became a local CBC reporter in Toronto.

Goldhawk Fights Back began as a consumer advocacy segment on CBLT's dinner hour newscast in the 1980s — Newshour. He joined Leslie Jones as co-host of CBLT Morning between 1984 and 1986. He moved to national radio from 1986 to 1992 as host of CBC Radio's Cross-Country Checkup. He was president of Alliance of Canadian Television and Radio Artists (ACTRA) and was also president of the NABET, the union representing most workers at CBC. This position was the background of Canadian Broadcasting Corp. v. Canada (Labour Relations Board), where he alleged he was dismissed due to his union position.

Goldhawk moved to CTV, where his consumer ombudsman segment was featured on the CTV National News until 2001 when his feature was cancelled by the network for budgetary reasons.

He then hosted Goldhawk Live, a nightly current affairs interview and phone in show, which aired on Rogers Television from 2001 until 2013. The show had a number of community figures and local and provincial politicians as guests and featured all candidate debates for Toronto electoral districts during federal, provincial, and municipal elections. Until 2016, he also had a Sunday night phone in show on CPAC, also called Goldhawk Live, which dealt with national issues.

From 2008 until 2016, Goldhawk Fights Back was a daily radio show on CFZM.

Goldhawk has also been involved in a consumer advocacy battle over the past decade against "bad faith business practices" that he claims are a major cause of net debt. He has partnered with political figures, notably Adam Vaughan on a campaign to clean up the streets in Ward 20 Trinity—Spadina. Goldhawk worked on and off with then-Toronto police chief Julian Fantino in efforts to enforce heavier fines on illegal garbage dumping in Ontario as part of the Warwick Watford Landfill Committee.

Goldhawk left broadcasting in 2016 to establish Goldhawk Group Canada, a public and media relations company.
