= Duncan McCue =

CBC radio and television personality

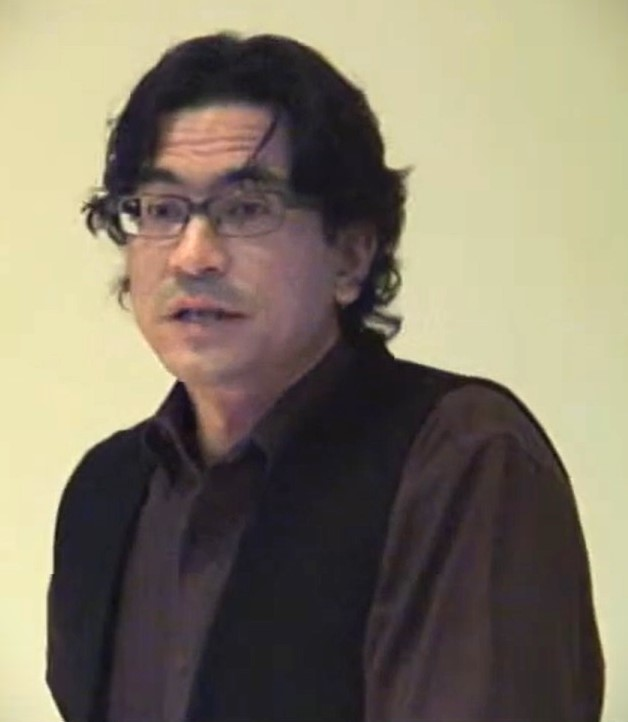
- McCue speaks at Media Democracy Days Vancouver before 2013
- Born: 1971 (age 54–55)
- Education: University of King's College
- Occupations: Journalist, academic

Duncan McCue is a Canadian television and radio journalist for the Canadian Broadcasting Corporation. He is Anishinaabe (Ojibway), from Ontario, a member of the Chippewas of Georgina Island First Nation. A longtime reporter for CBC Television's The National, he was the host of CBC Radio One's radio call-in show Cross Country Checkup from 2016 to 2020, and the first Indigenous person to host a mainstream show at the public broadcaster.

He took a sabbatical from the CBC in 2020 to take a journalism fellowship with Massey College; he has since returned to the CBC in other roles, including as host of a podcast on the history of the Indian residential school system, as a summer guest host of The Current, and as the host of a new weekly program on audio documentaries slated to premiere in fall 2022. In 2023, McCue announced that he would be leaving the CBC to join Carleton University's School of Journalism and Communication as an associate professor to lead a certificate course on Indigenous journalism.

== Early life ==
Born in 1971, McCue describes himself as half-Ojibwe, half-Caucasian and is a member of the Chippewas of Georgina Island First Nation in southern Ontario through his father Harvey McCue, an indigenous educator and advocate. He spent the majority of his early years in an urban environment in southern Ontario. When McCue was 11 years old, his father accepted a job in a school in northern Quebec, and brought the family to the remote Cree village, where Duncan felt like a "fish out of water" at school. McCue soon left the northern Cree village and returned to southern Ontario to attend Lakefield College School to finish high school.

At 17, McCue graduated high school and, at the suggestion of his father, took a year off school to hunt with a James Bay Cree family in northern Quebec, to trap and fish with an elder named Robbie Matthew Sr. Living on the land for five months helped McCue settle questions about his identity. He also learned about the plants and animals, and traditional methods of Cree teaching, which he calls "learning experientially". McCue would later write a book about that time in his life called The Shoe Boy.

McCue left the community to attend university and earned a degree in English at University of King's College in Halifax, Nova Scotia. His first introduction to journalism came working on the school newspaper at King's. After graduating, he attended law school at the University of British Columbia First Nations law program. While in school he worked part-time at several different television jobs, including as part of the CBC youth newsmagazine series Road Movies. In 1998 after he was called to the bar, McCue launched a career as television news reporter at CBC.

== Career ==
From 1998 to 2016 McCue worked as a national reporter for CBC radio and television in Vancouver, frequently filing for The National.

During this time McCue also worked as an adjunct professor at the University of British Columbia Graduate School of Journalism. He also taught Indigenous Canadians at First Nations University and Capilano College.

McCue has won a number of journalism awards, including a Jack Webster Award for Best Feature, an RTNDA Award for Best Long Feature and two regional RTNDA Diversity Awards for his coverage of Indigenous issues. McCue was part of the CBC Aboriginal team's investigation into missing and murdered Indigenous women which won the Hillman Award for Investigative Journalism and the 2016 Canadian Association of Journalist's Don McGillivray Award. in 2017 he won an Indspire award for public service.

In 2010–11, he was awarded a John S. Knight Journalism Fellowships at Stanford University in California. The fellowship allowed McCue to create an online education guide to help journalists who report in Indigenous communities. He continues to be the curator of Reporting in Indigenous Communities.

Beginning August 7, 2016 McCue became the new host of Cross Country Checkup, replacing Rex Murphy, making McCue the first Indigenous person to host a mainstream show at the public broadcaster. Checkup is a national open-line radio program. It plays weekly on Sunday afternoons, and covers a broad range of topics. According to the CBC, the show has more than a half million listeners and on average, 5,000 to 10,000 people attempt to call in each week. He also regularly reports on current affairs for The National.

In 2016 he was appointed Rogers visiting journalist at the Ryerson School of Journalism at the Faculty of Communication & Design (FCAD) where he worked with instructors in the School of Journalism to develop new approaches and curriculum for students learning to report on indigenous stories and issues. In 2018 he was awarded an Honorary Doctorate in Civil Law from the University of King's College in recognition of his public service.

In 2023 McCue was appointed as an associate professor at Carleton University in the School of Journalism and Communication. In this capacity, he is also the Director of a one year Certificate in Reporting in Indigenous Communities, which will accept its first class of students in fall 2025.

McCue lives in Ottawa. He has two children.
