= Saturday Report =

Saturday Report (officially titled CBC News: Saturday Report from 2001 to 2009) was the primary Saturday newscast aired on CBC Television and CBC Newsworld from 1982 to 2009. Jacquie Perrin was the program's most recent regular anchor, although that position had rotated frequently among CBC personalities in the newscast's later years. Its format has also changed over the years, with a lengthy sports highlights segment - found in few other CBC newscasts - replaced by additional features and panel discussions in 2001.

The program was rebranded as the Saturday edition of The National in September 2009, shortly before the news division's overall relaunch in late October. CBC News: Sunday Night was similarly replaced at the same time. Saturday Report had already been using the same graphics and music as the weekday program since 2001.

During the season of Hockey Night in Canada, the newscast aired nationwide at 6:00 p.m. ET / 3:00 p.m. PT on CBC Television. Otherwise it aired at 6:00 p.m. local time (7:00 AT, 7:30 NT). Additional airings were at 5:00, 9:00 and 12:00 midnight ET on Newsworld, with the 9:00 edition being frequently updated from the early-evening broadcast. The Saturday edition of The National followed a similar broadcast schedule until it was discontinued in late 2017, by which point many CBC stations had filled the timeslot with local newscasts; the remaining stations now air a simulcast of CBC News Network's rolling coverage.

Until the late 1990s, the main network also aired a late edition of Saturday Report outside of hockey season; this was later reduced to a short update and ultimately eliminated. A similar update aired during the first intermission of HNIC late games for a longer period but has since also been discontinued.

Prior to being renamed Saturday Report in 1982, the program was called The Saturday Evening News, and was anchored by Jan Tennant and alternately George McLean. The theme music used the instrumental portion of Joni Mitchell's Free Man in Paris.
