= Larry Henderson =

- Born: September 4, 1917; Montreal, Quebec, Canada
- Died: November 26, 2006 (aged 89); London, Ontario, Canada
- Education: McGill University
- Occupations: broadcaster, actor, news anchor, writer

Larry Henderson (September 4, 1917 – November 26, 2006) was the first regular newsreader on the CBC Television's The National News, later rebranded as The National, from 1954 to 1959. He was born in Montreal, Quebec.

Henderson was selected by Mavor Moore as the CBC Television's first regular national newsreader. Previously, each five-minute news bulletin had been read by a variety of announcers - a situation found to create a disjointed broadcast. By the end of 1954 the national news broadcast was expanded to 15 minutes, twice a day, with film and still pictures accompanying Henderson's narration.

Henderson was known for his temper and would swear on the air or make his reading unintelligibly fast when signalled by the director to speed up. On one occasion he walked off the set when the film for a news story was not ready on cue.

Henderson was born in Montreal and attended McGill University, where he studied music. In 1936 he travelled to England with the hopes of becoming a Shakespearian actor. In London, he studied at the London School of Economics and did further graduate studies at the School of Graduate Studies in Geneva, Switzerland. He spent three years in repertory theatre in England performing the lead in Doctor Faustus and playing Mercutio to Alec Guinness's Romeo in Romeo and Juliet.

In 1940, he returned to Canada and joined the announcing staff of the Canadian Broadcasting Corporation. In 1943, he enlisted in the Canadian Army serving in North Africa and Italy during World War II in the signal corps. Following the war, Henderson rejoined CBC - he applied to work for the broadcaster as an actor but instead found himself working as a staff announcer from 1946 to 1948 when he moved to CFRB to host Headliners which would eventually be syndicated to 24 private radio stations.

Henderson was the first Canadian broadcaster to cover the Korean War spending six weeks in the wartorn country in 1950. He subsequently travelled through Europe for three years sending recordings for his Headliners program back to Canada as well as hosting a CBC show, Passport to Adventure.

In 1954, he returned to Canada to accept a position at CBC Television as its newsreader in hopes of becoming the country's answer to Edward R. Murrow. Henderson would anchor the broadcast for almost five years and would, unusually for newsreaders at the time, memorize his script rather than read it live.

In 1959, Henderson left CBC to work for CHFI-FM and CHCH-TV. He later joined CTV National News as its international affairs expert and weekend news anchor. He left after several years to lecture and write books on international affairs and ran the Larry Henderson School of Television in Toronto. In the 1970s, Henderson joined the Canadian International Development Agency going on assignment to Tanzania where he helped organize the country's national broadcasting system.

In 1973, Henderson began writing for the Catholic Register becoming its editor the next year. He revitalized the paper increasing its subscription rate from 30,000 to 60,000 before his retirement in 1986. Under his leadership, the newspaper became a leading voice in the Canadian anti-abortion movement. In his later years, Henderson was managing editor of Challenge, a Canadian monthly Roman Catholic magazine. He retired from this venture in 2002.

Henderson died in his sleep on Monday, November 26, 2006 at his home in London, Ontario.

Media offices
Preceded by first	Anchor of The National News; CBC TV Nighttime National News; 1954–1959	Succeeded by Earl Cameron
