= Cross Country Checkup =

CBC Radio One program

- Genre: Phone-in
- Country of origin: Canada
- Language: English
- Syndicates: CBC Radio
- Hosted by: Ian Hanomansing
- Original release: May 16, 1965 – present
- Website: Cross Country Checkup

Cross Country Checkup is a Canada-wide open-line phone-in talk radio show that airs Sunday afternoons on CBC Radio One. Beginning in 2021, the first hour of the program has also been simulcast on television on CBC News Network.

The program has been hosted by Ian Hanomansing since September 2020; he was initially announced as an interim host for the 2020–21 season while previous host Duncan McCue was on an eight-month sabbatical, although his time with the program continued into 2022 before he was announced as the permanent host in June of that year.

Every week, the show features a lively discussion on an issue of national interest or importance and invites listeners to call in with their opinions and thoughts. The topics are usually related to Canadian politics. In addition to the host, the show has commentators who are experts or involved in the issue. They are interviewed by the host and answer questions from callers.

== Format ==
The program is broadcast Sundays live at 4 p.m. Eastern Time Zone across the country, unlike most other Radio One programs, which air at the same local time in each time zone. The recording of the live show is rerun in a condensed format on Monday afternoons at 3 p.m. EST as Cross Country in an Hour. On extraordinary news occasions, the show may also produce a special episode outside of its regular broadcast time.

Close to half-a-million listeners tune in every Sunday afternoon to hear a lively exchange of ideas between callers and invited guests, and a broad cross-section of opinion on the topic of the day. On average, 5,000 to 10,000 people attempt to call the program during the broadcast to join the discussion.

The show's current format takes calls on two topics for the show, one for each hour. The show previously had a segment called "Ask Me Anything" in which listeners were invited to call or write to ask a guest expert questions. However, that feature has been supplanted by a new live Saturday afternoon show, Just Asking, which is dedicated to that activity.

== History ==
The show was first broadcast on May 16, 1965, when it was started to provide a nationwide forum to discuss the then-proposed national health insurance system now in place in Canada. The first host was CBC Montreal announcer Bob Cadman, and its first guest was Dr Victor Goldbloom, then president of the Canadian Medical Association. When Checkup started broadcasting as a weekly series on November 24, 1965, Jim Schrumm was the first regular host. Subsequent hosts have included Brad Crandall, Moses Znaimer, Percy Saltzman, Betty Shapiro, John Dafoe, Pierre Pascau, Harry Elton, Elizabeth Gray, Wayne Grigsby, Dennis Trudeau, Augusta La Paix, Dale Goldhawk, Peter Downie, Royal Orr and Rex Murphy, who maintained the position for 21 years.

In September 2015, Murphy announced that he would be retiring from the program as of September 20. The program was hosted by a series of guest hosts through the first half of 2016, until McCue's appointment as the new permanent host was announced in July.

On occasions in the past, the program has gone to air as Cross-Continent Checkup by involving a radio network in at least one other foreign country, such as National Public Radio in the United States, London Broadcasting Company (as it was then known) in Britain or the CBC's own Radio Canada International, and taking calls from English-speaking callers in all involved countries. In each case, callers generally call a toll-free number in their own country. Checkup, nevertheless, often receives calls from callers outside Canada.

For the 2016–2017 season; the show changed the signature music that opened the programme since at least the early 1970s.
