= Alison Smith (journalist) =

Canadian television and radio journalist and anchor

Alison Smith (born August 22, 1954) is a Canadian television and radio journalist and anchor.

She graduated in 1972 from Southern Okanagan Secondary School in Oliver, British Columbia, where her father Bruce was a guidance counsellor. She studied at the University of British Columbia in Vancouver and Ryerson Polytechnical Institute in Toronto.

By 1982, Smith was working as a reporter in Toronto. From 2005 to 2009, Smith was CBC Television's Washington correspondent, succeeding David Halton. Prior to her Washington assignment, she was the host of the network's morning show CBC News: Morning, and was also the anchor for The National from 1992 to 1995 when the program aired only on CBC Newsworld during which period CBC Prime Time News was CBC's flagship news show. Smith was also one of the first anchors for CBC Newsworld on the program This Day.

On September 28, 2009, Smith became anchor of CBC Radio One's The World at Six. On May 8, 2014, Smith announced her retirement from CBC. Smith's last day as anchor on The World at Six was June 26, 2014. In 2016, she joined CPAC as host of a new weekly series on international affairs.
