= Board of Internal Economy =

Administrative body of the Canadian House of Commons

The Board of Internal Economy (French: Bureau de régie interne) is the body that governs the administrative and financial policies of the House of Commons of Canada. Unlike most committees of the Parliament of Canada, the Board of Internal Economy continues through prorogation and dissolution. The Board is presided over by the Speaker of the House of Commons.

== History ==
The Board of Internal Economy was established in 1868, with the passage of An Act respecting the internal Economy of the House of Commons, and for other purposes.

== Membership of the Board ==
=== The Chair of the Board ===
The Speaker of the House of Commons is the Chair of the Board of Internal Economy; the current Chair is Francis Scarpaleggia. The Chair is responsible for presiding over sittings of the Board, deciding on points of order, and for delivering a casting vote wherever a question before the Board cannot be decided. The Chair is counted when discerning the presence of a quorum.

The Chair is established by Section 50(1) of the Parliament of Canada Act.

50. (1) There shall be a Board of Internal Economy of the House of Commons, in this section and sections 51 to 53 referred to as "the Board", over which the Speaker of the House of Commons shall preside.

In the event of the death, incapacity or unavoidable absence of the Speaker, then five members of the Board would constitute a quorum (one of whom would need to be a Minister of the Crown, in the absence of the Speaker), and the Board would then proceed to designate one of its members as the Chair for that sitting.

=== Other members ===
The Board also has two members of His Majesty's Privy Council for Canada, appointed by the Governor General, under Section 50(2) of the Parliament of Canada Act, to represent the Government. Generally speaking, members appointed to the Board from the Privy Council are simultaneously Ministers of the Crown. Currently, these are the House Leader and the Whip.

The Leader of the Opposition is given an opportunity to sit on the Board under Section 50(2) of the Parliament of Canada Act; however, in modern times, the workload of the Opposition Leader necessitates the appointment of another member of the Opposition to represent His Majesty's Loyal Opposition on the Board.

Sections 50(2)(a) and 50(2)(b) provide for the appointment of several additional members to the Board of Internal Economy, to represent the other recognized parties in the House of Commons (a recognized party is any with at least twelve seats in the House). If there is only one recognized party in opposition to the Government, then that party receives two representatives, and the Government receives one. If there are multiple recognized parties in opposition, then each party receives one representative, and the Government may appoint a number of members one less than the total number appointed by those parties.

=== List of members ===
As of November 2025, the membership in addition to the chair is as follows:

Party	Member	Office
Liberal	Francis Scarpaleggia	Speaker of the House (Chair)
Liberal	Mark Gerretsen	Chief Government Whip
Liberal	Arielle Kayabaga	Deputy Government House Leader
Liberal	Steven MacKinnon	Government House Leader
Bloc Québécois	Yves Perron	Bloc Québécois Whip
Conservative	Chris Warkentin	Opposition Whip
Conservative	Andrew Scheer	Opposition House Leader

== Secretary to the Board ==
The Secretary to the Board is responsible for recording the results of questions put to the Board, and for responding to the requests of the Chair for clarification regarding parliamentary procedure and regulations; he or she also records the minutes of the sittings. In addition to this role, as the chief executive of House administration, the Secretary to the Board is the officer responsible for carrying out and enforcing the decisions of the Board in the name of the Speaker. As per Section 51 of the Parliament of Canada Act, the Clerk of the House of Commons serves as the Secretary to the Board. The current Secretary is Charles Robert.
