= Saša Petricic =

Canadian journalist

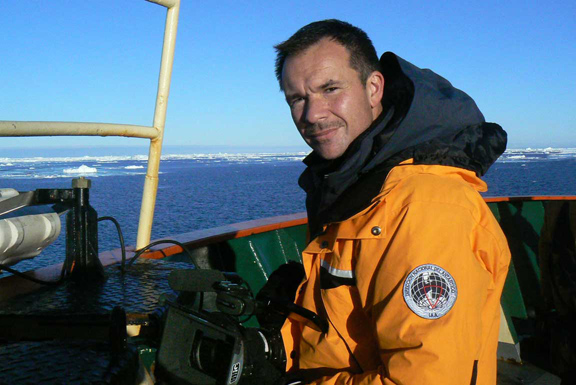
- CBC videojournalist Saša Petricic on assignment in Antarctica, March 2007
- Occupation: journalist

Saša Petricic (/pɛtʃrɪsɪk/ PEH-tri-sick) is a Canadian journalist and photographer. He is currently a senior correspondent and videojournalist for CBC Television's The National and other CBC News programs, based in Toronto and specializing in world news. He previously spent five years as the CBC's Asia Correspondent, based in Beijing and four years covering the Middle East from Jerusalem.

== Education ==
Petricic attended high school in Toronto, at the North Toronto Collegiate Institute. He went on to earn a journalism degree with combined honours in Soviet and East European Studies from Carleton University. He also studied at Hope College in Michigan and at the University of Quebec.

== Career ==
From 1993 to 2001, Petricic covered federal politics, elections and political issues from the Canadian Parliament in Ottawa. During that time, he contributed various stories and features to BBC News and CNN. He subsequently covered major events and issues from every continent as a CBC correspondent and videojournalist. In 2006, Petricic was the first CBC reporter to file stories from Antarctica. He covered the 2004 Indian Ocean earthquake and tsunami and genocide in Rwanda, the September 11 attacks on the U.S. and Canada's mission in Afghanistan for CBC News.

From 2011 to 2015, Petricic was Middle East Correspondent for The National, based in Jerusalem. He covered the region's Arab Spring uprisings from Egypt, Libya, Syria and Tunisia. Petricic also covered conflicts between Israel and Hamas in Gaza in 2012 and 2014.

In 2015, Petricic was appointed China Bureau Chief for CBC in Beijing. He followed the rise in power of the Chinese Communist Party leader Xi Jinping and a new, more assertive China. In the region, he covered standoffs between South Korea and North Korea from both countries, pro-democracy protests in Hong Kong, earthquakes in Nepal and typhoons in the Philippines. Petricic chronicled the arrest of Canadians Michael Kovrig, an ex-diplomat, and Michael Spavor, a businessman, by China on espionage charges. He also watched the COVID-19 pandemic spread from Wuhan, Hubei, China from its first days.

Petricic has also taught television journalism at the National University of Rwanda, through the non-profit Rwanda Initiative, and conducted courses in documentary-making at the Canadian Screen Training Centre and through the London-based organization Raindance.

On June 12, 2013, Petricic was arrested by Turkish forces during the 2013 Gezi Park protests in Turkey while photographing a municipal cleanup crew clearing barricades near Taksim Square in Istanbul. He was released one day later.

== Awards ==
Petricic has won numerous awards for his work. In 2014, his war coverage of the Syrian conflict from Aleppo and around Syria won Canada's top TV journalism award, the Canadian Screen Award for Best Reportage. Petricic also won the 1999 Canadian Association of Journalists Award for Investigative Journalism and the 2005 Canadian Radio and Television News Directors' Association Award for his work in Rwanda, for a story profiling Canadian Doctor James Orbinski. In August 2008, Petricic received a Gemini Nomination for Best News Feature for his documentary on activities by Christian missionaries in Thailand after the 2004 Indian Ocean earthquake and tsunami.

== Photography ==
For most of his journalistic career, Petricic has also been a photojournalist and art photographer. His first solo exhibition "Innocent Bystanders" was at Heliographics Gallery in Toronto in June 2022. This was followed up with a second solo exhibit in Ottawa at Studio Sixty Six in July 2023. His premiere international exhibit was held in Belgrade, Serbia in September 2023 at Grafički Kolektiv and opened by Canadian ambassador to Serbia Giles Norman. Petricic has also presented his work at London, U.K.'s Frontline Club. In June 2024, he held an exhibit of his photography from the ancient Silk Road at Heligraphics Gallery and published the book "Scenes from the Silk Road" to coincide with the show.
