= Brian Stewart (journalist) =

Canadian journalist

Brian Stewart OC OOnt
- Born: April 21, 1942 (age 84); Montreal, Quebec, Canada
- Occupation: reporter
- Known for: broadcast journalism

Brian Edward Stewart, OC OOnt (born April 21, 1942) is a Canadian journalist. Stewart is best known for his news reports and documentary features as senior correspondent of the Canadian Broadcasting Corporation's (CBC) flagship news hour, The National, where he worked for over two decades.

A past Gemini award winner as Canada's Best Overall Journalist, Stewart also hosted network current affairs shows including CBC News: Our World, and continues to appear frequently on CBC as a current affairs analyst and documentary essayist following his retirement in 2009. A journalist since 1964, Mr Stewart has been a reporter in both print and television.

He is currently a Distinguished Senior Fellow with the Munk School of Global Affairs at the University of Toronto.

== Early life and education ==
Born in Montreal, Quebec on April 21, 1942, Stewart spent much of his youth in Halifax, Nova Scotia and England. Stewart's father was the president of the Simpsons department store chain. He attended Upper Canada College and Thornton Hall in Toronto in 1958 and graduated from the Ryerson School of Journalism in 1964.

=== Career ===
Stewart first worked in print as a reporter with the (now defunct) Oshawa Times, the Richmond-Twickenham Times (UK) and The Montreal Gazette through the years 1964–71. He first joined the CBC in 1971 at CBMT Montreal as a host of the supper-hour television current affairs program Hourglass.

In 1973 he was appointed a national reporter in Ottawa where he was the network's foreign affairs and military specialist. He became CBC's foreign correspondent in London in 1982 where he worked until joining NBC as a foreign correspondent in 1985.

Stewart returned to Canada in 1987 to become senior reporter with the CBC's The Journal, a post in which he wrote and hosted a series of specials on North American and world politics.

Stewart has been one of Canada's most prominent foreign correspondents. He covered many of the world's conflicts and has reported from ten war zones, from El Salvador and Beirut to Afghanistan.

During the Gulf War, he was the first Canadian reporter to get into the liberated Kuwait City. In the Second Sudanese Civil War in 1989, his report on child slavery, Sudan: Children of Darkness (with Tony Burman), won several international awards, including the UNDA prize at the Monte Carlo Television Festival.

He has worked extensively in underdeveloped countries and was the first North American reporter to focus the world's attention on the massive Ethiopian famine of 1984–85 (also with Tony Burman). In 1987, Stewart's career was the subject of a major documentary, The War Reporters, produced by Brian McKenna.

"Having Brian Stewart on a story meant no one could ever beat us," says Mark Starowicz, creator and executive producer of The Journal. "It would always be brilliant journalism and it would always be head and shoulders over any reportage by any other journalist in the world covering that story."

During the Ethiopian Famine of 1984, Stewart covered the near death survival of a three-year-old girl Birhan Woldu, reports that made her the Face of Famine in 1985 and the subject of a famous video played during the Live Aid Concert.

Stewart later returned to search for the girl in Northern Ethiopia and continued to chronicle her life over two decades. The two were interviewed on the Oprah Winfrey Show in 2006. Birhan Woldu, who remains close friends with Stewart's family, went on to graduate from college with degrees in Agriculture and Nursing in Ethiopia. The story of Stewart's discovery of her is told in the 2012 book "Feed the World: Birhan Woldu and Live Aid" by British journalist Oliver Harvey.

In the course of his reporting career, Stewart has interviewed such leading world figures as Margaret Thatcher, Lech Wałęsa, Nelson Mandela and Henry Kissinger.

In 1994, he was made host of CBC current affairs show The Magazine and later conducted extensive interviews with newsmakers as host of two interview shows, including CBC News: Our World. He was a frequent back-up anchor on The National to Host Peter Mansbridge.

=== Personal ===
Stewart married CBC broadcaster and journalist Tina Srebotnjak in 1989, and they have a daughter, Kathleen Stewart (b. 1993). The Stewart family lives in Toronto. In the article "Black Mischief" published in the February 2007 issue of Vanity Fair, Stewart is described as the closest friend of former newspaper mogul Conrad Black. Of Black, Stewart is quoted as saying, "He has a child-like hunger that cannot be assuaged. He is driven by the need to be somebody, to be noticed, that is beyond the norm. He has a totally tin ear when it comes to his P.R. persona."

== Awards and honours ==
In 1988, Stewart received a Centre for Investigative Journalism Award in the "Television" category for his groundbreaking report on the Air India Flight 182 crash.

Stewart received the Gemini Award as "Best Overall Broadcast Journalist," the prestigious Gordon Sinclair Award, in 1996. Nominated for numerous Geminis, he won "Best Information Segment" in 1994 for Rwanda: Autopsy of a Genocide, in which he uncovered advanced warnings of the mass murders. In 1995, his moving report Return To Ethiopia was broadcast internationally and his documentary The Somalia Affair won top prize for investigative reporting at the Canadian Association of Journalists awards in 1993.

In May 2004, he presented the Convocation Address during the 160th Anniversary of Toronto's Knox College, University of Toronto, titled On the Front Lines .

He was the 2009 Ross Munro Media Award Recipient; awarded by the Conference of Defence Associations (CDA), in concert with the Canadian Defence and Foreign Affairs Institute, in recognition of "his extraordinary contribution to increasing public understanding of Canadian defence and security issues." In 2012 he was made an honorary doctor of Theology after giving the Convocation address at the Atlantic School of Theology in Halifax to mark his service to humanity as a reporter. In June 2012 he was awarded the Queen's Diamond Jubilee Medal. In 2013, he was made a Member of the Order of Ontario.

He was appointed to the Order of Canada in 2022 with the rank of Officer.
