= Jan Tennant =

Canadian journalist, news anchor

- Born: January 5, 1937 (age 89); Toronto, Ontario, Canada
- Education: Humberside Collegiate Institute
- Alma mater: University of Toronto
- Occupations: Journalist; news anchor; teacher
- Employer(s): Canadian Broadcasting Corporation; Global Television Network
- Known for: Reach for the Top; Saturday Report

Jan Tennant (born January 5, 1937) is a Canadian television journalist, news anchor, and announcer.

== Early life ==
Tennant was born January 5, 1937 in Toronto, Ontario, growing up in the High Park North neighbourhood, attended Runnymede Public School and Humberside Collegiate Institute, and then attended the University of Toronto.

== Teaching ==
She graduated with a degree in Physical Education and Health and began teaching at Queen Elizabeth Junior High in Port Credit, Ontario (1960), Switzerland (1961–62), then obtained a Type A Certificate in Physical and Health Education, and Type B in English and French at the Ontario College of Education (1962–63) before resuming teaching at Castle Frank High School in Toronto until 1965.

== Broadcasting ==
Jan Tennant joined the CBC in 1966 as a unit secretary. She soon became a script assistant for The Way It Is and The Nature of Things and then moved into announcing for both radio and television. She was formerly an announcer for the CBC Radio and CBC Television including commentary on Science Magazine and in 1974, became the first woman to host The National when she appeared as a substitute anchor. Jan became the announcer for the popular CBC-TV series Reach for the Top in 1971, and in 1973 she took over from Alex Trebek as host of the series for the next eight years. Tennant had also anchored The Saturday Evening News, the 6 p.m. national newscast, before that program was renamed Saturday Report in 1982.

She left the CBC in 1982 worked as an anchor for Global Television Network, including two years co-anchoring the supper hour newscast with Peter Trueman, until Trueman moved to Ottawa to host a half-hour national newscast that followed Tenant anchoring a half-hour from Toronto. She also anchored the 11 pm newscast and occasionally Global's noon newscast until leaving the network in 1987.

Tennant then moved to CBC Stereo where she hosted Listen to the Music, a 90-minute classical music programme, for two years. Tennant also narrated various independent documentaries in the 1980s and 1990s including Footholds (1984) Handle on Health (1987), and Return of the Swift Fox and For Richer, For Poorer (1988), and A Nurse's Opinion (1991). In 1989, she moved to West Vancouver and worked on a freelance basis. She hosted and narrated The Time of Your Life, from 1991 to 1996. The series profiled inspiring senior citizens and aired on Global Television, Vision TV and the W Network and was carried by stations around the world. Her last professional job was narrating Burns Bog - A Road Runs Through It, a National Film Board documentary about an ecosystem south of Vancouver. She retired from broadcasting in 1998.

In 2022, following the ouster of Lisa LaFlamme from her position as anchor of CTV National News, Tennant commented "I was the first woman to read CBC's The National on April 13, 1974. I weep for Lisa LaFlamme. I weep for myself (a little bit) and for all the women anchors in between and yet to come."

Tennant is married to George Robertson, a former producer of CBC Television's The Fifth Estate.
