= Susan Ormiston =

Canadian journalist

Susan Ormiston is a Canadian television journalist, correspondent for CBC Television's The National and guest host for several CBC radio and television programs. She has covered prominent events including the election of Nelson Mandela in 1994 in the first free elections in South Africa.

In 2022, she was named the CBC's permanent new climate correspondent.

== Biography ==
Ormiston is a foreign correspondent for CBC News. She has reported widely on Canadian and world events, including the election of President Nelson Mandela in South Africa (1994), and the retirement of Pope Benedict XVI in 2013. Ormiston has covered wars and rebellions in Afghanistan, Lebanon, Syria, Libya and Egypt. She has also followed the euro area crisis in Egypt, Italy, and Germany, and while based in London covered the London Olympics, the Royal Wedding of William and Kate, and the Queen's Diamond Jubilee.

Ormiston has interviewed a wide variety of news-makers including Bill Clinton, Michaëlle Jean, Stanley McChrystal, Christine Lagarde, and entertainment personalities such as Celine Dion, Shania Twain and Russell Peters. She has taught broadcast journalism courses at Ryerson Polytechnic University in Toronto and has served as a volunteer speaker for Alzheimer's Disease.

Originally from Saskatchewan, Ormiston attended Evan Hardy Collegiate in Saskatoon. She received a Bachelor of Journalism Honours degree at Carleton University in Ottawa. Ormiston joined CBC as host and reporter in Toronto, and was a news co-anchor in Halifax, Nova Scotia as well as CBC's National TV Reporter in the Maritime provinces.

During the 1990s, Ormiston moved to CTV, as host of its long-running W-FIVE current affairs program. She also hosted NewsNet and was a financial reporter from the Toronto Stock Exchange.

In 2001, Ormiston rejoined CBC to work on Marketplace, and later, Fifth Estate. As a reporter for CBC's The National, she has reported from Canada, Europe, and the Middle East. Ormiston hosted "Ormiston Online" for Canada Votes, CBC's coverage of the 2008 Federal election. In 2010 she moved to London as CBC's foreign correspondent, where she lived with her husband Keith Harradence and two sons.

== TV and radio programs ==
- The National, CBC TV, Correspondent
- As It Happens, CBC Radio, guest host
- CBC News: Morning, CBC TV, guest host
- CBC News: Sunday, CBC TV, guest host
- The Current, CBC Radio, guest host
- The Fifth Estate, CBC TV Host
- Inside Media, CBC Newsworld, CBC TV, Host
- Marketplace, CBC TV Correspondent
- W-FIVE, CTV (1990–2000) Host/Correspondent
- The Alzheimer Journey, Alzheimer Society of Canada, educational video host

== Awards ==
- 2012 Gemini Nomination Best Breaking News - Reports from Syria
- 2011 Foreign Press Association Award News Story of the Year "Protecting Kate".
- 2011 RTNDA Best News Story From Madrassa to Murder
- 2010 - Gemini Award for Ormiston Online - digital reporting
- 2007 - Gemini Award Best News Reporting 'Reports from Afghanistan'
- 1996 - Gemini Award Best News Feature Multiculturalism Documentary
- 1995-2010 - Four News Awards RTNDA (Radio Television News Director Awards)
