= Stanley Burke =

Canadian journalist (1923–2016)

- Born: February 8, 1923
- Died: May 28, 2016 (aged 93); Kingston, Ontario, Canada
- Occupations: Journalist, news presenter, author
- Television: The National

Stanley Burke Jr. (February 8, 1923 – May 28, 2016) was a Canadian television journalist.

== Early years ==
Born February 8, 1923, Burke's father was businessman Stanley Burke, founder of Pemberton Securities, a stockbrokerage firm in Western Canada. His brother was Lieutenant-Commander Cornelius Burke, a prominent Royal Canadian Navy officer during World War II.

== Career ==
He was the anchor of CBC Television's The National News from 1966 to 1969. The show was renamed The National after he resigned to launch a public campaign to bring attention to the Nigerian Civil War and the humanitarian crisis in the secessionist state of Biafra.

Following his retirement from the CBC, Burke also wrote a number of books satirizing Canadian politics in the form of children's stories, including Frog Fables and Beaver Tales, The Day of the Glorious Revolution and Swamp Song.

In the 1980s, he was publisher with partner Jack McCann of the weekly newspaper Nanaimo Times in Nanaimo, British Columbia.

== Death ==
Burke died at the Kingston General Hospital in Kingston, Ontario on May 28, 2016, aged 93.

== Bibliography ==
- — (1973). Frog Fables & Beaver Tales. Illustrated by Roy Peterson. Toronto: J. Lewis & Samuel. ISBN 0-88862-048-9.
- — (1974). The Day of the Glorious Revolution. Illustrated by Roy Peterson. Toronto: James Lorimer & Company Ltd. ISBN 0-88862-067-5.
- —; Roy Peterson (1976). Blood, sweat & bears. Vancouver: J. J. Douglas. ISBN 0-88894-117-X.
- —; Roy Peterson (1978). Swamp song. Vancouver: Douglas & McIntyre. ISBN 0-88894-212-5.
- —; Roy Peterson (1981). The birch bark caper. Vancouver: Douglas & McIntyre. ISBN 0-88894-306-7.
- —; Peggie Coulter (1990). The heart of Newfoundland. Halifax: Stone House. ISBN 0-921128-30-4.

Media offices
Preceded by Earl Cameron	Anchor of The National News; CBC TV Nighttime National News; 1966–1969	Succeeded by Warren Davis
