= Earl Cameron (broadcaster) =

Canadian broadcaster (1915–2005)

- Born: June 12, 1915; Moose Jaw, Saskatchewan, Canada
- Died: January 13, 2005 (aged 89); Barrie, Ontario, Canada
- Occupation: Broadcaster
- Known for: CBC's The National Anchor (1959–1966)

Earl Cameron (June 12, 1915 – January 13, 2005) was a Canadian broadcaster and was anchor of CBC's The National from 1959 to 1966.

== Biography ==
Cameron was born in Moose Jaw, Saskatchewan in 1915, and, as a student, found a summer job at a local radio station, CHAB. He established a career in broadcasting before joining the main CBC Radio network in Toronto in 1944 where he was assigned as reader of the daily CBC National News Bulletin following Lorne Greene's departure from the CBC as the "Voice of doom". It was Cameron who announced the D-Day invasion of Normandy to Canadian listeners. As an announcer his other duties included reading commercials, station identifications and hosting various programs.

During this period CBC followed the example of the BBC in giving responsibility for reading the news to announcers rather than to journalists, an approach that became entrenched by union regulations.

In 1959, Cameron succeeded Larry Henderson as the anchor of the CBC Television National News (today known as The National). During the 1960s, managers at CBC News moved towards a philosophy of regarding news announcers as journalists rather than performers. As part of this shift, the news service management put pressure on the announcers union to accept an agreement prohibiting news readers from commercials or accepting outside contracts with ad agencies. Cameron was personally pressured to terminate his outside announcing contracts reading commercials for products such as Crest toothpaste and Rambler automobiles and agreed in 1965 to give up his lucrative ad contracts. However, the next year, Cameron was dropped as the anchor of the National News, due to management's desire to have a professional journalist in the position of news anchor. Cameron was replaced by broadcast journalist Stanley Burke, although he continued as an announcer on CBC radio and television until his retirement in 1976. One of his duties was as the host of Viewpoint, a nightly five-minute programme which followed The National in which Cameron read letters from viewers.

Eugene Levy's Earl Camembert character on SCTV was named after Earl Cameron, but otherwise bore no resemblance to Cameron — the name was merely an offhand joke designed to get a laugh from Canadian viewers. (The same is true of Camembert's coanchor Floyd Robertson, played by Joe Flaherty, who otherwise has no connection with or resemblance to Canadian news anchor Lloyd Robertson.)

Cameron died in Barrie, Ontario, on January 13, 2005.
