= George McLean (journalist) =

Canadian journalist (1923–2016)

- Born: George Angus McLean; May 16, 1923; Brandon, Manitoba, Canada
- Died: March 13, 2016 (aged 92); Toronto, Ontario, Canada
- Occupations: Journalist, news presenter
- Employer: Canadian Broadcasting Corporation
- Television: The National

George Angus McLean (May 16, 1923 – March 16, 2016) was a Canadian television journalist, best known for his work as a TV anchor for the Canadian Broadcasting Corporation (CBC).

== Personal ==
Born in Brandon, Manitoba, his family moved to Manchester, England in 1929. McLean was educated in the United Kingdom and joined the Royal Air Force during World War II. He transferred to the Royal Canadian Air Force in 1944 and returned to Canada following the end of the war.

McLean married his first wife, Majorie, in 1947; she died in 1982. His second marriage to Barbara Quick in 1987 lasted until his death.

== Broadcasting career ==
=== Radio ===
In 1946 he joined CJRL radio in Kenora, Ontario and in 1952 became news editor at CKRC in Winnipeg, Manitoba. In 1953 he became chief announcer at CKOK in Penticton, British Columbia.

=== Television ===
In 1956 he joined the CBC in Vancouver as a staff announcer for CBC Television. In 1965 McLean was transferred to Toronto and became a regular backup for hosting national newscasts including The National, a role which he performed until 1986 when he retired from the CBC. McLean was also the regular host of Saturday Report, the Saturday evening national newscast. He was the announcer on the long-running series Front Page Challenge.

== Post retirement and death ==
He continued to do occasional voice-over work after his retirement and golf in his spare time, moved to Lagoon City in Ramara, Ontario and died in a Toronto hospital in March 2016.
