= Kim Brunhuber =

Canadian journalist and writer

Kim Barry Brunhuber is a Canadian journalist and author.

He served as a weekend anchor on CNN International, hosting the European breakfast edition of CNN Newsroom until May 2026. Before joining CNN in 2020, he served as anchor and reporter for the Canadian Broadcasting Corporation, including on the flagship news program The National and on CBC News Network.

== Career ==
Born in Montreal and raised in Ottawa, Brunhuber is of mixed Cameroonian and White South African descent.

He published a novel, Kameleon Man, in 2004. The novel was a shortlisted nominee for the 2004 ReLit Award in the fiction category.
