= Warren Davis (broadcaster) =

Canadian broadcaster (1926–1995)

Warren Davis (1926 – January 27, 1995) was a Canadian broadcaster and newsreader. He was the first anchor of CBC Television's The National, from 1969 to 1970. The show was rebranded from the earlier news program The National News. He was born in Peterborough, Ontario.

At various times in his career on television and radio, Davis hosted a number of music and current affairs programs as well as being the host of Reach for the Top for the 1965 to 1966 season. He won an ACTRA Award for best radio host in 1979.

He was the original host of CBC Radio's Two New Hours, a weekly showcase of contemporary classical music, from 1978 until his retirement in 1986. Upon his retirement he began a brief acting career. He was married and had three children. He died at the age of 68 on January 27, 1995 in Barrie, Ontario, of cancer.

Media offices
Preceded by Stanley Burke	Anchor of The National; 1969–1970	Succeeded by Lloyd Robertson
