= CBC Prime Time News =

Canadian television newscast

- Title screen used from 1992 to 1994. A different opening used for the 1994-95 season was essentially identical (aside from the title) to the open used by The National from 1995-97.
- Also known as: Prime Time News
- Presented by: Peter Mansbridge; Pamela Wallin (1992–95); Hana Gartner (1995)
- Country of origin: Canada
- Original language: English
- No. of episodes: N/A

Production
- Running time: 60 mins.

Original release
- Network: CBC
- Release: November 2, 1992 – September 1, 1995

CBC Prime Time News is a Canadian nightly newscast which aired on CBC Television from 1992 to 1995.

== Background ==
For the previous ten years, the CBC's nightly newscast, The National, had aired at 10 p.m., and was followed by a 40-minute newsmagazine package called The Journal, which was hosted by Barbara Frum. However, following Frum's death in early 1992, the CBC took the opportunity to revamp its flagship newscast.

The CBC's live coverage of the Charlottetown Accord referendum results on October 26, 1992, effectively acted as a soft launch for the show, which formally debuted on November 2. With Peter Mansbridge and Pamela Wallin as equal cohosts of a package which replaced both The National and The Journal, Prime Time News combined news and Journal-style features into a single integrated program which aired at 9 p.m.

Despite the change, The National was not entirely discontinued; concurrently with the change on the main network, the CBC's separate all-news channel CBC Newsworld adopted the title for its own prime time news program.

The program's choice of name also created a conflict with CBC Radio's Prime Time, whose host Geoff Pevere spoke out against the potential confusion caused by the television and radio programs having such similar names.

== Ratings performance ==
Although ratings were strong at first, with its first week seeing a full 30 per cent improvement over The National's average ratings during the previous year, the approach proved unpopular, both within the CBC and with network audiences and critics. The National had been produced by the CBC's news department, while The Journal belonged to current affairs; bringing the two departments together was fractious, and the on-air rapport between Wallin and Mansbridge was visibly tense at times. Critics especially lambasted the debut episode, whose lead story was the last full day of the 1992 United States presidential election campaign, as "an uninspiring collection of newsreading, charts and cutaways to foreign correspondents" more reminiscent of a local television station than a national network with the high reputation of CBC News, and viewer response to the new program's format was highly unfavourable.

Also, because the program aired at 9 p.m. (in most time zones as per long-standing CBC scheduling policy, with a half-hour delay in the Newfoundland Time Zone), it was competing in one of the most heavily watched timeslots on the commercial networks in the Eastern, Pacific and Mountain time zones, the majority of the four principal zones in Northern America. Although The National and The Journal had faced commercial competition at 10 p.m. ET/PT/MT, they had been much more successful at carving out their own niche because in that time slot, almost all of the commercial networks were airing drama series (indeed, news programs in that time slot and 9 p.m. CT had been long-standing successes for both independent stations and affiliates of Fox and its newer competitors The WB and UPN in the United States). At 9 p.m. ET/PT/MT, Prime Time News had to compete with fare including popular sitcoms produced by the television divisions of Hollywood studios such as Cheers, Frasier, Seinfeld and Murphy Brown.

As a result, Prime Time News rapidly dropped off in the ratings, seeing a 12 per cent viewership decline after its first week alone; by the end of the first month ratings were lower than The National. CTV National News concurrently saw its ratings jump 40 per cent, overtaking the CBC in national newscast ratings for the first time in its history, and CBC Newsworld's edition of The National saw viewership gains of 30 per cent over that network's prior prime time lineup, and itself sometimes garnered higher ratings than Prime Time News.

The shift also resulted in significant ratings declines for several other programs, including Man Alive and The Nature of Things, whose timeslots had been shifted to accommodate the new program.

== Format revisions ==
In the fall of 1994, Prime Time News returned to the 10 p.m. time slot, and to a format closer to the old National and Journal. Mansbridge again became the sole anchor of the news portion of the show, and Wallin became the host of a magazine segment very similar to The Journal. However, the show retained the name Prime Time News for the 1994–1995 television season, and Wallin sometimes appeared as substitute anchor of the main news portion when Mansbridge was absent.

Ratings recovered significantly following this shift; by December, the show was regularly drawing fully 95 per cent of The National's former audience.

In April 1995, Wallin was dropped from the program, and was succeeded by Hana Gartner in June. In the fall the newscast officially reverted to the name The National, while the magazine segment became The National Magazine. This format remained in place until The National was again re-launched as a one-hour newscast in early 2001.
