= The National (TV program) =

Canadian national television news program

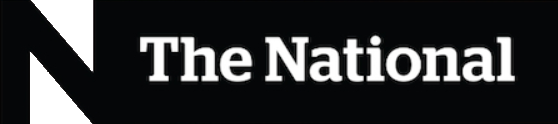
- Logo for The National as of November 6, 2017
- Genre: News
- Created by: Mavor Moore
- Presented by: Monday–Thursday: Adrienne Arsenault; Friday: Paul Hunter; Sunday: Ian Hanomansing
- Country of origin: Canada
- Original language: English

Production
- Production locations: Monday–Thursday: Canadian Broadcasting Centre, Toronto; Friday and Sunday: CBC Regional Broadcast Centre, Vancouver; At Issue: CBC Ottawa Production Centre, Ottawa
- Camera setup: Multi-camera
- Running time: 60 minutes
- Production company: Canadian Broadcasting Corporation

Original release
- Network: CBC Television (1952–1992, 1995–present); CBC News Network (1989–present)
- Release: 1952 – present

Related
- Le Téléjournal

The National (officially CBC News: The National) is a Canadian national television news program that serves as the flagship broadcast for the English-language news division of CBC News by the Canadian Broadcasting Corporation. It reports on major Canadian and international news stories, airing on CBC Television stations nationwide Sunday to Friday at 10:00 p.m. local time (10:30 p.m. NT).

The program is also aired on CBC News Network; on weekdays, the initial version that airs live to Atlantic Canada on the main network is simulcast on CBC News Network at 9:00 p.m. ET, with several repeat broadcasts overnight. Until August 2005, The National was seen in the United States on the defunct Newsworld International channel; the program continues to be aired occasionally on C-SPAN when that network wants to provide coverage of a major Canadian news story, or a Canadian angle for a world or American event.

The National and other CBC newscasts, including CBC owned-and-operated stations' (O&Os) early-evening local newscasts, are streamed on the CBC website; those residing outside of Canada may not be able to view some content. The show is also aired in Australia on SBS and made available on SBS ON Demand.

The National's partner French-language newscast is Le Téléjournal, aired on the Radio-Canada TV network.

== Format ==
The National used to run a news headlines segment for 20 to 25 minutes without commercial interruption. This format has been relaxed or reinstated at various points over the years. Subsequent segments would consist of documentaries or other feature reports, either in the form of a separate program (The Journal or The Magazine) or as additional segments of the main program.

The opening segment generally runs 15 to 20 minutes, followed by additional segments of varying length featuring additional stories, features, or panel discussions. Long-form documentaries or feature reports are not as common as they were prior to 2009, but are featured from time to time, particularly during the Friday and Sunday editions. The broadcast contains some live inserts but some of the broadcast's segments are taped prior to the program's airtime. The anchor begins every broadcast by saying "Thanks for joining us" or "Thank you for joining us". Because of the length and the story count of the first two segments, the anchor concludes the first segment of the broadcast by saying "We're back in two" and the second segment of the broadcast by saying "The National breaks down the stories shaping our world, next" or "The National takes you deeper into the stories shaping our world, next". Since 2023, the news segment of the show has been followed by a segment called "The Breakdown". The anchor begins the segment by saying "Now it's time to dig deeper into the stories shaping our world." The program concludes with a final segment called "The Moment".

From October 2009 to September 2012, weekday (and, on some stations, Sunday) airings on CBC O&Os ended at 10:55 p.m. with the anchor handing over to 10-minute local news bulletins that overlapped the normal 11:00 p.m. start time of the competing CTV National News. On CBC News Network, the weekday editions continued to run a full hour during this period; separate final segments, both pre-taped, were used for the 55- and 60-minute versions. Private affiliates, some of which had already been airing 11:00 p.m. local newscasts prior to the implementation of the 55-minute format, had the option of carrying either the 55- or 60-minute version. On September 17, 2012, with many CBC O&Os extending late local news to 30 minutes, The National reverted to a single 60-minute format on weeknights and Sundays. (Those stations which continue to produce 10-minute late local newscasts now air them starting at 11:00, followed by a condensed 20-minute version of The Exchange before rejoining the network schedule at 11:30.)

From 2009 to 2017, a 30-minute Saturday edition of The National (essentially a rebranding of the long-standing Saturday Report) generally aired on CBC Television at 6:00 p.m. ET during the season of Hockey Night in Canada (or if other live CBC Sports broadcasts are scheduled for that evening), and 6:00 local (7:00 AT, 7:30 NT) otherwise, with updated editions throughout the evening on CBC News Network. However, beginning in the early 2010s, most CBC stations in eastern Canada began to carry local newscasts in that timeslot instead, or used a local opt-out at 6:20 ET. Just before the fall 2017 relaunch, the Saturday edition was discontinued altogether in favour of additional segments of CBC News Network's rolling coverage, with the 6:00 p.m. ET segment, simulcast on CBC Television in western Canada, serving as the CBC's de facto network TV newscast of record on Saturdays.

== History ==
The National began as The National News in 1954. Since 1952, there had been a five-minute national news bulletin on the fledgling CBC Television service - each bulletin would be read by a different reader, which the CBC's management realised resulted in a disjoined broadcast. Program director Mavor Moore decided to choose a single newsreader for the program in order to create continuity. He hired veteran radio newsman Larry Henderson to anchor the broadcast which soon expanded to a nightly thirteen-minute program airing at 11 pm. Henderson, who had hoped to become Canada's answer to Edward R. Murrow, had spent several years travelling the world with his Headliners radio broadcast. He proved a temperamental newsreader who would occasionally swear on the air, respond in anger to cues to speed up his reading, and once walked off the set when a filmed segment was not ready on cue.

Henderson left the broadcast in 1959 and was succeeded by Earl Cameron, who had been presenter of the National News Bulletin on the CBC's main radio service, the Trans-Canada Network, since 1944. Changes in the philosophy of CBC News led to Cameron, a professional announcer rather than a journalist, being replaced by journalist Stanley Burke, in 1966.

Though journalists were now reading the news, union regulations required a journalist acting as news anchor to leave the journalists' union and join the announcers' union and thus prohibited the anchor from doing anything other than reading a script written by others. Burke anchored the show from 1966 until 1969 when he resigned in order to launch a public campaign on the Biafran civil war. Burke was replaced by Warren Davis, at which point the show was renamed The National and the program was broadcast in colour. From 1970, the program was anchored by Lloyd Robertson until he was hired away by the CTV Television Network, the CBC's rival, in 1976, largely as a result of Robertson's frustration at not being able to participate in the writing of the newscast due to union rules.

Peter Kent hosted the show for two years and, because he had worked as a senior correspondent with CBC News Magazine and The National, he was allowed to report and write and anchor The National and CBC News Specials before leaving to return to work as a foreign correspondent. In 1978, Knowlton Nash—who had been director of news and current affairs, three management levels above being Kent's supervisor—became the newscast's new anchor, after winning an audition process whose result was upheld in arbitration. Inaccurate news reports had claimed Nash appointed himself to the role. During Nash's tenure, the CBC was able to win formal concessions from its unions allowing working journalists to read the news, allowing Nash to assume the title of "Chief Correspondent" for CBC News. This allowed him to participate in the writing of the show's script as well as act as a news editor with influence over the stories selected for the newscast and other questions of editorial judgment. Nash stepped down as chief anchor in 1988 and was replaced by Peter Mansbridge.

On January 11, 1982, The National was relaunched in the 10:00 p.m. timeslot with a modernized design and format. The Journal, a program that covered news stories in greater depth using interviews and documentaries, followed it at 10:22 p.m.

One of the hosts of The Journal from the beginning was Barbara Frum, who quickly became a symbol of CBC News as she was not afraid to tackle the toughest and most controversial of issues. Frum died of chronic leukemia on March 26, 1992. Her final interview was with Canadian author Mordecai Richler, which took place just days before her death.

That same year, the CBC, which was undergoing major changes, replaced The National and The Journal with Prime Time News, an integrated package which aired at 9:00 p.m. with two hosts, Mansbridge and Pamela Wallin. However, the show fared poorly in the ratings, resulting in the competing CTV National News overtaking the CBC in national news ratings for the first time in its history, and returned to the 10 p.m. time slot in 1994. During this time, the title The National was retained by a separate newscast on CBC Newsworld, hosted by Alison Smith.

In 1995, the main-network program reverted to the name The National, hosted by Mansbridge, and was followed by The National Magazine, hosted by Hana Gartner. Brian Stewart later took the helm of the second program, which was retitled The Magazine. It continued as a pseudo-separate program until the start of the federal election campaign of fall 2000, when the second half-hour was turned over to additional election coverage hosted by Mansbridge, under the moniker "Behind the Ballot". However, The Magazine did not return after the election, and Mansbridge continued to anchor the full hour. In early 2001, this integrated format was introduced as part of a revamp of the program; for a time, the latter part of the hour was often titled Documentary, on nights when such were featured; on other occasions, feature reports and/or panel discussions would be featured instead. The program acquired a new look and format in the eventful fall of that year with the CBC's latest corporate redesign.

Beginning in the late 1990s, in an effort to provide an 11:00 p.m. alternative to the now-dominant CTV National News, the CBC's owned-and-operated stations would repeat the news headline portion of The National at 11:00 p.m., followed (until summer 2000) by a half-hour local newscast at 11:30. This practice ended in October 2006, when The Hour began airing in that timeslot. Most private affiliates of the CBC did not broadcast the 11 p.m. airing.

"The National Online" debuted on the web on March 21, 1996. The interactive website initially made "available both information about the program and more in-depth content to supplement what we broadcast on television." Later that year the website added news "headlines and very short summaries that got updated about once a day - but that's how online news got started at CBC."

On January 9, 2006, The National adopted a new look as part of a major rebranding for CBC News, stemming mainly from an extensive study by the CBC into how to make news programming more relevant, particularly in the face of stiff competition from CTV National News and Global National. The rebranding had been scheduled for September 2005 but was postponed because of the lengthy lockout that had just concluded at that time. The primary colour of CBC News shifted from blue to red, not unlike BBC News.

The CBC in summer 2006 briefly and controversially aired The National at 11 p.m. on Tuesday nights in the Eastern Time Zone, in order to simulcast the American airing of The One: Making a Music Star. The One received very low ratings on both ABC and CBC, and after two weeks The National returned to airing at 10 p.m. five nights a week as of July 31, 2006.

In May 2007, The National launched a redesigned website featuring the latest broadcast, recent documentaries, and an extensive online archive that opens the floor for comments from the viewers. There is also a behind-the-scenes blog and video bios on many of the reporters.

In December 2008, it was announced that as part of a larger series of planned changes surrounding CBC News, Saturday Report and Sunday Night were to be replaced by weekend editions of The National in 2009, citing that The National had better brand awareness than other CBC News properties. These changes took effect in September 2009; as with its predecessor, a half-hour version of the Saturday-night edition was still scheduled at 6 p.m. ET during the NHL season as a lead-in to Hockey Night in Canada's pre-game show.

Mansbridge, as chief correspondent for CBC News, remained the regular weeknight anchor until 2017, normally hosting from Monday to Thursday, but hosting other nights if a significant news event occurred. Mansbridge also regularly anchored on Fridays until the late 2000s; although CBC primetime promos on Fridays in the early 2010s often indicated that Mansbridge was the regular anchor that night as well, by that point Wendy Mesley was usually substituting, and she was later made the permanent Friday anchor. Mesley had also been the Sunday anchor since September 2010, essentially a reprisal of her tenure as anchor of Sunday Report in the early 1990s, while Asha Tomlinson was the last regular Saturday anchor.

=== 2017–present: Mansbridge's retirement, relaunch ===
In September 2016, Mansbridge announced that he would retire as anchor of the program in 2017, following the network's Canada Day broadcast. On the future of the program following his departure, CBC News editor-in-chief Jennifer McGuire told the Canadian Press that the CBC were planning to perform a significant revamp of The National in October 2017.

On August 1, 2017, the CBC announced that Adrienne Arsenault, Rosemary Barton, Andrew Chang, and Ian Hanomansing would host a revamped version of The National beginning on November 6, 2017. The four anchors hosted from different cities, with Arsenault and Hanomansing initially hosting primarily from Toronto, Barton from Ottawa, and Chang from Vancouver; however, the anchors were able to host on-location as warranted by stories. Master control and playout still came from the CBC facilities in Toronto. During the series run the anchor duty stations shifted, with Hanomansing principally hosting from Vancouver and Chang from Toronto.

CBC News executive Jonathan Whitten stated that the new format will be designed to focus more upon in-depth and "personal" coverage of ongoing stories, rather than merely recapping all of the day's headlines. Whitten explained that "increasingly the audience is going to demand more at the end of the day. Some may think we're jumping too fast into a world where we're abandoning that six or seven, two-minute news item [model], but we think that's what the positioning for the future's about." There will also be a focus on expanding the presence of The National as an overarching brand for original journalism across the CBC's television and digital platforms, rather than referring solely to the TV program (to emphasize this perspective, CBC staff have also referred to the program internally as The National Tonight rather than just The National).

The inaugural episode with the new format received mixed to negative reviews; John Doyle wrote in The Globe and Mail that the show was no longer a newscast, but a "chatty, visually bewildering assessment of some news stories of the day" that felt "disjointed, surreal and sadly lacking in coherence". Although acknowledging that its hosts were "superb" journalists, he argued that its opening story on the Sutherland Springs church shooting featured "a reporter, skilled at doing traditional TV reportage, suddenly doing deep feelings and expected to be personally raw. That, with respect, is what the Dr. Phil show is for – exposed feelings and some kind of half-baked social context." Johanna Schneller wrote for the Toronto Star that the new format was likely an admission by the CBC that "you know the news, but we're the experts. Not the stentorian experts-on-high the way we used to be; we're chatty experts. Your four friends who always make you go, 'Huh.'"

On January 22, 2020, CBC News announced revisions to the program, dropping the four-anchor format and having Arsenault and Chang co-anchor from Monday through Thursday. Hanomansing would serve as solo anchor for the Friday and Sunday editions. Barton became the chief political correspondent for CBC News and the host of the Sunday morning political talk show Rosemary Barton Live; she continues to host The National's weekly "At Issue" political panel.

In 2022, the CBC announced further changes. Arsenault now serves as sole weekday anchor, with Hanomansing continuing to anchor on Friday and Sunday. Chang moved to a new daily program being created for the launch of CBC's streaming news service, CBC News Explore.

== Presentation ==
Former title card in 2009

The show's name was shortened to The National in 1969. The broadcast's original opening, used from 1969 through 1982, was known as "the Bloops" and featured the title of the program in a "space-age" font in green on the bottom of the screen, superimposed over a wide shot of the set. Sometimes the program title appeared in the centre of the screen, with a black background. Accompanied by synthesized beeps that resembled an old computer, different letters rapidly cycled from left to right until they spelled "The National".

An announcer, usually Allan McFee, would intone "The National, with <anchorperson>", followed by a cut to a shot of the anchor beside a screen. The anchor of the program would then summarize the top stories as different slides appeared for each of them on the screen.

An internal study was conducted in July 1979 on whether to move The National to the 10 p.m. slot. This study group was composed of Bill Morgan, Mark Starowicz, and Vince Carlin.

On January 11, 1982, the CBC relaunched The National with a radically different format and presentation style that looked very hi-tech for its time. The intro started with a map of the world superimposed on a cube which began to rotate, splitting into smaller cubes as it did. The final rotation revealed the title of the show in shiny chrome lettering using the font Stop. The synthesized opening music featured a fanfare played by The Canadian Brass, called The National.

During the mid-1980s, Quantel Paintbox was used to create many of the graphics for the stories.

On July 31, 1989, the CBC updated the presentation of The National with more modern computer graphics, similar to those used on CBC Newsworld at the same time. The logo used all upper-case letters in the typeface Times New Roman.

After Barbara Frum's death in 1992, The Journal—which she hosted—was subsequently cancelled later that year and replaced with CBC Prime Time News; the name The National was retained on CBC Newsworld for its late evening news bulletin.

From 1995 to 1997, the logo used the font Palatino in upper-case for the words "The National", and Frutiger in upper-case for the words "CBC News" underneath.

A new opening and look for the show appeared in 1997 that retained the style of the 1995 opening but used somewhat more sophisticated and modern computer animation.

In 2001, a logo was introduced that used the typeface Microgramma, centred on two lines, with the CBC News logo underneath in Frutiger. It was short-lived, lasting only a few months.

In the fall of 2001, the presentation of The National was updated along with the corporate redesign of the entire network to have one consistent branding. The New York design firm Razorfish designed the look of this and other network programs. The logo used the typeface Frutiger in upper case.

In late 2004 or early 2005, several graphics were modified, featuring more blue, less beige, and a slightly modified logo (with bolder type for "The National"). These changes were only implemented in selected sequences, sometimes leading to confusion - i.e., the older set of graphics was used at the start of the newscast's opening, and the new set was used at the end of the open.

The opening sequence started with the CBC News ID which flowed into the main graphic sequence, followed by Mansbridge or the fill-in anchor saying "Tonight ..." followed by a verbal listing of the main headlines and accompanying video and graphics. The title sequence would then continue, and cut to an aerial view of Toronto (new shot every Monday which then ran the entire week) and Lisa Dalbello announcing up and under the theme saying "The National; from the Canadian Broadcasting Centre, here is Peter Mansbridge."

In early 2006, the entire news division - including The National and CBC Newsworld - received another update, including a new theme song and new title sequences, featuring the colours red, black, and white. From 2008 to the 2009 rebranding, Tony Daniels introduced the show and the host.

After more than two years in the making, The National underwent sweeping changes on October 26, 2009. Host Peter Mansbridge began delivering all segments of the news standing up, a style pioneered in Canada by the Citytv system. The set was redesigned and the colour blue was mixed into the previous channel's colours of red and white. A press release had stated that the 2006 theme music would remain intact; however, new music cues by Eggplant Collective were created. Most of the logos and graphic fonts were changed to use Christian Schwartz's Stag typeface.

In 2016, the program received a new opening sequence featuring a sweeping pan of the program title followed by a flash. The lower-thirds and other graphical elements were also updated.

Since 2023, during The Breakdown, the studio lights were changed from blue to white.

== Personalities ==
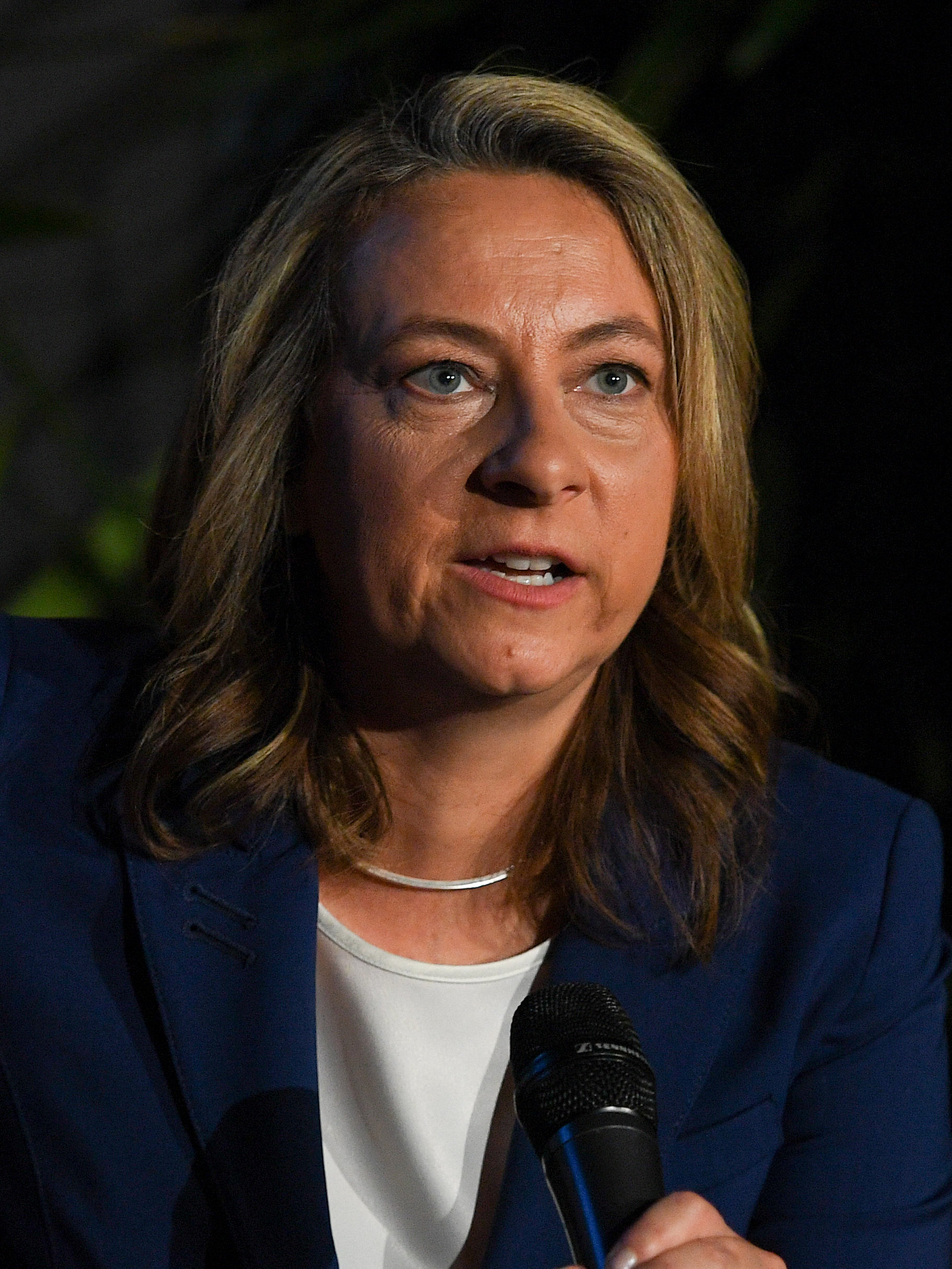
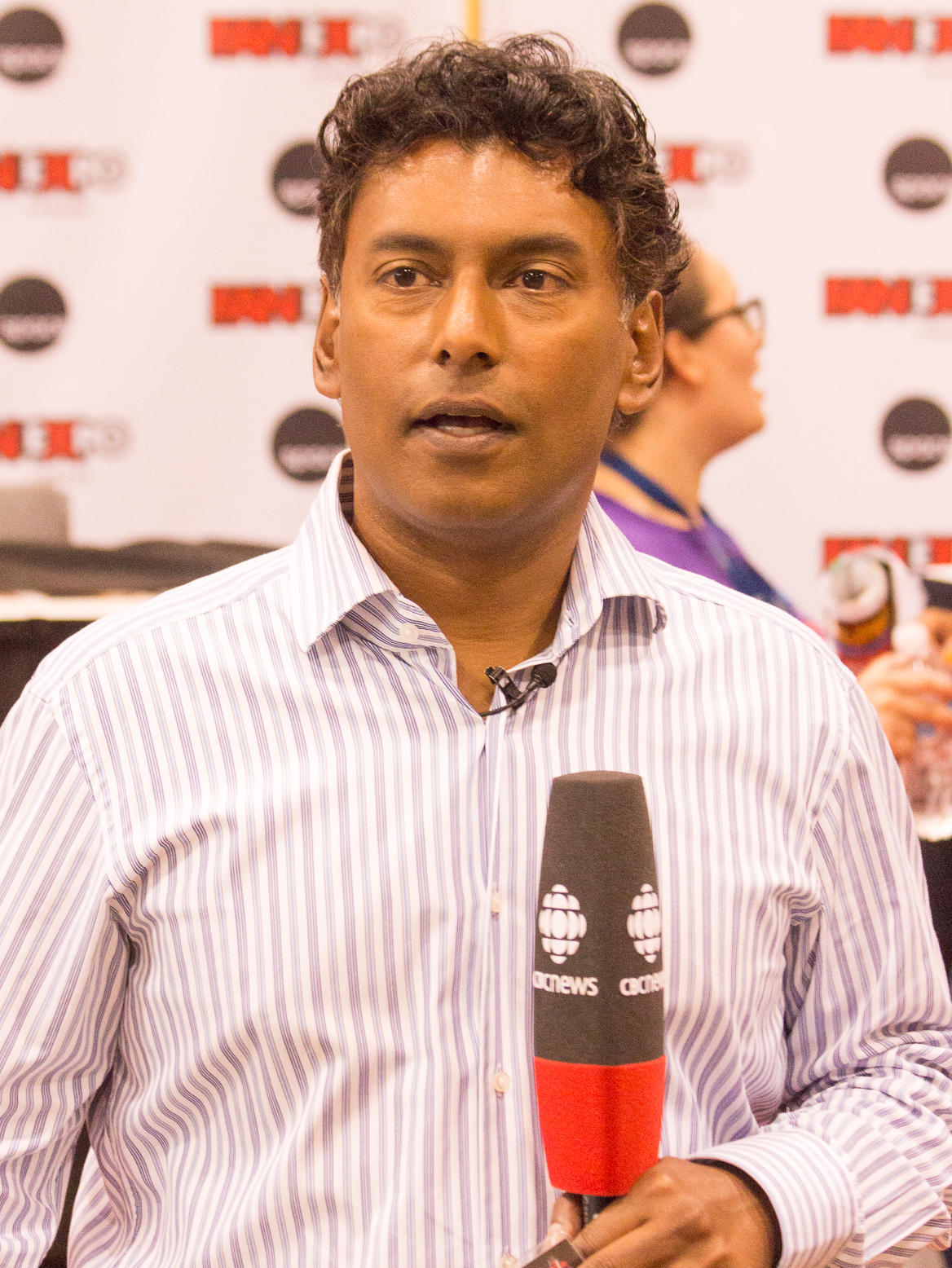
Adrienne Arsenault and Ian Hanomansing, the current hosts of The National

=== Anchors ===
- 1954–1959: Larry Henderson
- 1959–1966: Earl Cameron
- 1966–1969: Stanley Burke
- 1969–1970: Warren Davis
- 1970–1976: Lloyd Robertson
- 1976–1978: Peter Kent
- 1978–1988: Knowlton Nash
- 1988–1992: Peter Mansbridge
- 1992–1995: Alison Smith
- 1995–2017: Peter Mansbridge
- 2017–2020: Adrienne Arsenault, Rosemary Barton, Andrew Chang and Ian Hanomansing
- 2020–2022: Adrienne Arsenault and Andrew Chang (Monday to Thursday); Ian Hanomansing (Friday and Sunday)
- 2022–2025: Adrienne Arsenault (Monday to Thursday); Ian Hanomansing (Friday and Sunday)
- 2025–2026: Adrienne Arsenault (Monday to Thursday); Erica Johnson (Friday); Ian Hanomansing (Sunday)
- 2026-present: Adrienne Arsenault (Monday to Thursday); Paul Hunter (Friday); Ian Hanomansing (Sunday)

=== Journalist staff ===
- Nahlah Ayed, foreign correspondent, London, UK
- Rosemary Barton, chief political correspondent
- Christine Birak, health and science reporter
- Keith Boag, correspondent, Washington, D.C.
- Kim Brunhuber, correspondent, Los Angeles
- Havard Gould, business reporter, Toronto
- Ian Hanomansing, Friday & Sunday anchor
- Paul Hunter, foreign correspondent and substitute host, Toronto
- Laura Lynch, reporter, Toronto
- Neil Macdonald, senior correspondent, Ottawa
- Duncan McCue, reporter, Vancouver
- Bob McDonald, science correspondent, currently based in Victoria
- Wendy Mesley, reporter, Toronto
- Terry Milewski, senior correspondent, Ottawa
- Rex Murphy, commentator, Toronto
- Susan Ormiston, senior correspondent, Toronto
- Saša Petricic, foreign correspondent, Beijing
- Reg Sherren, reporter, Winnipeg
- Katie Simpson, foreign correspondent, Washington, D.C.
- Derek Stoffel, foreign correspondent, Middle East
- Deana Sumanac-Johnson, arts reporter, Toronto
- Diana Swain, senior investigative journalist, Toronto

Other personalities who have anchored The National as weekend or substitute anchors include George McLean, George Finstad, Alison Smith, Wendy Mesley, Diana Swain, Carole MacNeil, Mark Kelley, Brian Stewart, Ian Hanomansing, Heather Hiscox, Asha Tomlinson, and Evan Solomon. In 1974, Jan Tennant became the first woman to anchor the programme.

=== Commentators and panels ===
The National features a number of recurring discussion and commentary segments:

- A political panel titled "At Issue" hosted by Rosemary Barton airs weekly, usually on Thursday nights, except during the summer. The regular panellists are columnists Andrew Coyne, Chantal Hébert, and Althia Raj from the Globe and Mail, Toronto Star, and Toronto Star respectively, who are occasionally joined by one or more guest panellists. The At Issue panel was formerly followed by a weekly commentary segment by Rex Murphy, titled "Point of View", prior to his retirement in 2017.
  - "At Issue" and Rex Murphy's commentary were also repeated as a stand-alone half-hour weekend program on CBC News Network.
- Other regular panels include:
  - "The Insiders": Three former political-party backroom organizers – usually David Herle of the Liberals, Jaime Watt of the Conservatives, and Kathleen Monk of the New Democratic Party – provide commentary (intended as non-partisan) about political strategy. Usually appears bi-weekly on Tuesday nights
  - "The Bottom Line": A monthly Tuesday-night panel about the economy with various panellists, typically including Preet Banerjee, Patti Croft and Jim Stanford
  - "Turning Point": A semi-regular panel on foreign affairs, with regular panellists Samantha Nutt and Janice Stein
  - "National Check-Up": A semi-regular panel on health issues, with physicians Danielle Martin, Vivek Rao and Samir Sinha
  - "The Sunday Talk": A weekly panel on Sunday broadcasts, with various panellists
  - "The Pop Panel": A weekly panel on Friday broadcasts
  - "The Moment": A segment that was shown at the end of every broadcast
  - "Our Changing Planet"
  - "CBC News Investigates"
  - "Go Public": A weekly segment introduced by Hanomansing on Sunday broadcasts, except during the summer months. Ian closes every Go Public segment by saying "Our Go Public stories come from you, so if you have a tip for the team to investigate, send an e-mail to gopublic@cbc.ca"
  - "Marketplace": A weekly segment introduced by Arsenault on Thursday broadcasts, except during the spring and summer months
  - "The Fifth Estate": A weekly segment introduced by Arsenault on Thursday broadcasts, except during the summer months
  - "The Interview with Ian Hanomansing/It Changed Everything": A weekly segment hosted by Hanomansing on Sunday broadcasts. During summer months, reruns of segments were aired.
  - "Quick Question": A weekly segment on Friday broadcasts
  - "The Breakdown": A daily segment during the second half of the show
  - "Frontburner": A commercial that was aired after the final commercial break

Current Affairs Editors

- Aileen McBride (senior)
- Sheldon Beldick
- Ed MacDonald
- Morna Scott-Dunne
- Jan Silverthorne

== Awards ==
The National has received many awards including Geminis and foreign awards.
