= CBC-2 =

Proposed second Canadian public television service

CBC-2 Télé-2
- Type: Proposed television channel
- Country: Canada
- Availability: National
- Owner: Canadian Broadcasting Corporation (Government of Canada)
- Launch date: Never aired
- Fate: Applications denied by the CRTC

CBC Television 2 and Télé-2 were proposed second television services to be operated by the Canadian Broadcasting Corporation (CBC)/Société Radio-Canada (SRC). These were to have been the Canadian equivalents to BBC Two in the United Kingdom (itself the second television channel of the BBC) and Antenne 2 in France.

== History ==
In the late 1970s, the CBC/SRC created a plan that would make two additional channels available to Canada's 3.5 million cable subscribers. These two channels, CBC-2 and Télé-2, would have potentially bumped U.S. commercial stations carried on the cable system because, at the time, there was a lack of extra channel capacity on most cable systems.

The CBC/SRC made a formal application to the Canadian Radio-television and Telecommunications Commission (CRTC) in August 1980 for a licence to create a network that would replay programming in English and French (Télé-2), with the formal hearing taking place over three days, beginning on January 14, 1981. The two new services would commence broadcasting in January 1982. In response to the application, the CRTC received 82 interventions, of which 25 individuals or organizations would make in-person presentations.

Among those opposed to the creation of the networks were Canwest Broadcasting (owner of CKND-TV), four Progressive Conservative MPs, the Canadian Association of Broadcasters (CAB), B.C. Television Broadcasting System Ltd., and the Ontario government. Among the supporters of the application were various arts groups.

The networks would air Monday thru Friday between 6:45 p.m. and 11:05 p.m. On weekends, the schedule would air between 6:30 p.m. and 11:30 p.m. Operational costs in the first year for both networks would be C$27.5–30 million.

The corporation had proposed that CBC-2 would:

- be non-commercial
- be a basic, must-carry service
- feature programming from CBC and provincial educational broadcasters
- feature regional programming broadcast to a national audience
- feature arts and culture, drama, news

== License denial ==
In CRTC Decision 81-353, the governing body denied the CBC's applications, citing concerns over funding, audience erosion, and the services' limited reach. The commission sought to have the original CBC television network be completed first.
