= Andrew Chang =

Canadian journalist (born 1982)

- Born: 15 December 1982 (age 43); Ottawa, Ontario, Canada
- Education: Carleton University
- Presenting career
- Show: The National; About That
- Network: CBC Television
- Country: Canada
- Previous shows: CBC News Vancouver at 6 CBC Montreal News at 6

Andrew Chang (born 15 December 1982) is a Canadian television journalist, best known as a co-anchor of CBC Television's nightly flagship newscast The National. Since 2022, he has hosted the CBC streaming news program About That.

== Early life and education ==
Andrew Chang was born on 15 December 1982 in Ottawa. He grew up speaking English in a family where his father spoke Cantonese and his mother spoke Mandarin. After moving to Quebec, he became fluent in French.

He graduated from Carleton University with a degree in journalism.

== Career ==
Chang joined the CBC in 2004 at CBC Montreal as a researcher. He was a part of CBC's broadcast team for the 2014 Winter Olympics. From 2014 to 2017, he was anchor of CBC Vancouver's News at 6. For this work, he won the Best News Anchor, Local award at the Canadian Screen Awards in 2016 and 2018. On 1 August 2017, he was named co-host of The National.

In June 2022, the CBC announced that Chang would be stepping away from The National, and moving to host a new daily program for the CBC's forthcoming streaming news service. His program, About That, features him delving in more depth into one particular topic or issue in the news in each episode, and launched on CBC News Explore on November 30, 2022.
