= Adrienne Arsenault =

Canadian journalist

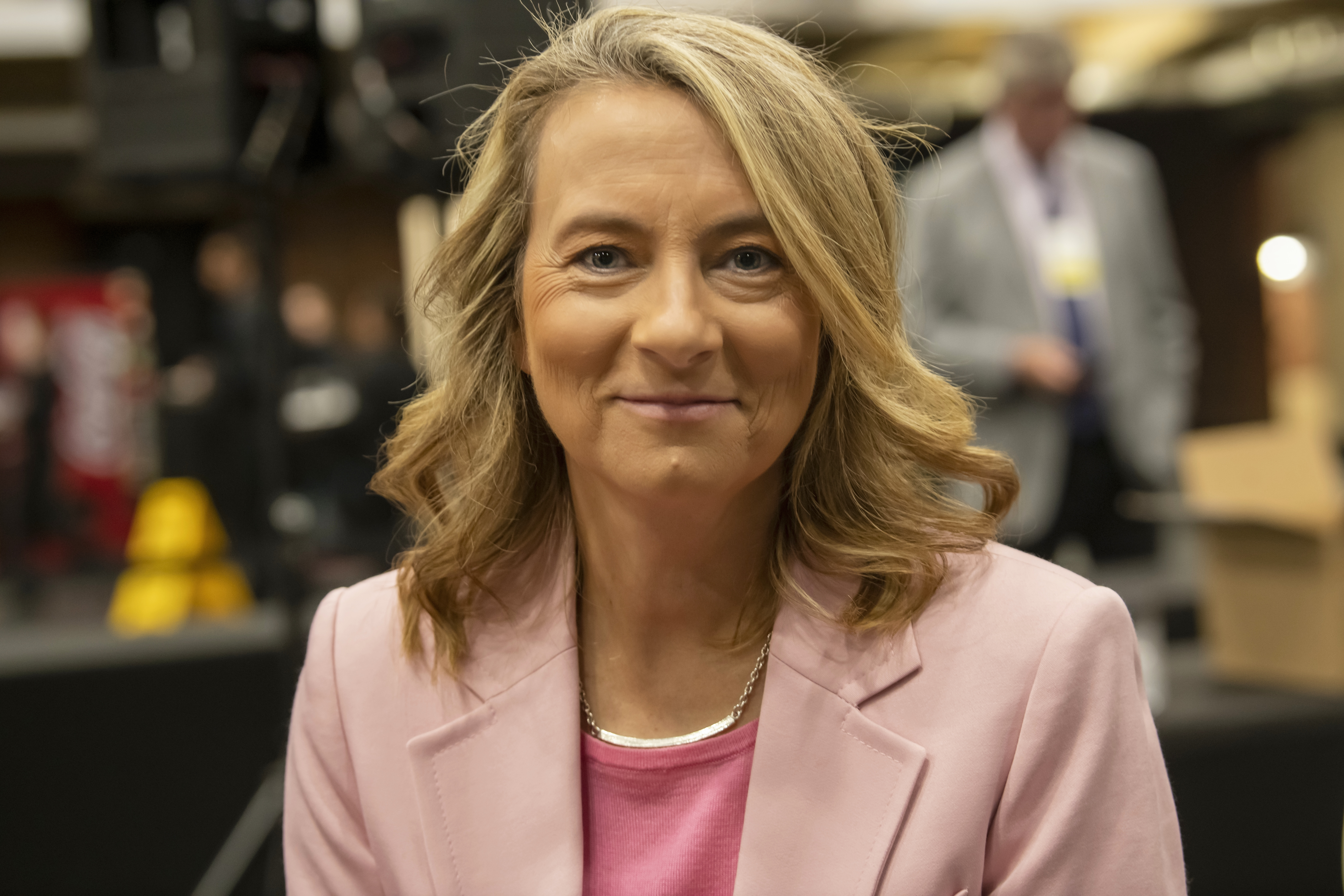
- Arsenault in 2023
- Born: 1966 or 1967 (age 59–60); Toronto, Ontario, Canada
- Education: University of Western Ontario (BA, MA)
- Occupation: Journalist
- Years active: 1991–present
- Title: Anchor of The National

Adrienne Arsenault (born 1966 or 1967) is a Canadian journalist who is the Chief Correspondent of CBC News and anchor of The National since November 2017.

== Early life and education ==
Born and raised in Toronto, Arsenault is the daughter of Bette Arsenault and Ray Arsenault (1929–2006), a Canadian television director whose credits include King of Kensington and Hockey Night in Canada.

In 1986, Arsenault graduated from St. Clement's School in Ontario as Head Girl. She went on to the University of Western Ontario, receiving a Bachelor of Arts in 1990 and a Master of Arts in Journalism in 1991. While at Western, Arsenault developed her interest in broadcasting at CHRW-FM.

== Career ==
Arsenault joined the CBC in 1991, as an editorial assistant and night assignment editor for CBC Toronto. She has had numerous other positions with the CBC. She spent three years as the foreign correspondent in Jerusalem. In 2006, she succeeded Don Murray as the chief London correspondent.

In 2008, she was part of a small group of Western reporters who were allowed into Zimbabwe to report on that year's election in the country. In 2023, she interviewed Princess Anne for CBC News.

== Awards ==
Arsenault was named the Commonwealth Broadcasting Association's journalist of the year for 2005.

Arsenault has won two Gemini Awards, in 2008, in the categories of Best Reportage and in Best News Magazine Segment and nominated for five Gemini Awards, for her work on The National, including a segment called "Healing Hikkaduwa". She has won awards from the American Society of Professional Journalists, the Radio-Television News Directors Association, and the New York and Columbus festivals.

In September 2015, she was Senior Correspondent on a team that won the News & Documentary Emmy Award for her coverage of the Ebola virus epidemic in Liberia.

She won the Canadian Screen Award for Best Host or Interviewer in a News or Information Program or Series at the 7th Canadian Screen Awards in 2019.

She was awarded an honorary Doctor of Divinity from Huron University College in 2023.

== Related Media ==
- CBC biography
- Bio: Adrienne Arsenault on YouTube
- Adrienne Arsenault at IMDb
