= Rex Murphy =

Canadian political commentator (1947–2024)

- Born: Robert Rex Rafael Murphy; March 1947; Carbonear, Newfoundland
- Died: 9 May 2024 (aged 77); Toronto, Ontario, Canada
- Education: Memorial University of Newfoundland (BA); St Edmund Hall, Oxford
- Occupations: Author, journalist

Rex Murphy (March 1947 – 9 May 2024) was a Canadian commentator and author, primarily on Canadian political and social matters. He was the regular host of CBC Radio One's Cross Country Checkup, a nationwide call-in show, for 21 years before stepping down in September 2015. He wrote for the National Post and had a YouTube channel called RexTV.

== Early life and education ==
Robert Rex Rafael Murphy was born in March 1947 in Carbonear, in the Dominion of Newfoundland. Like all British subjects born in Newfoundland prior to its union with Canada in 1949, Murphy became a natural-born Canadian citizen under the Newfoundland Terms of Union and an amendment to the Canadian Citizenship Act, passed in 1949. Murphy grew up in Placentia, 105 kilometres west of St. John's, and is the second of five children of Harry and Marie Murphy. He graduated from Memorial University of Newfoundland with a degree in Education in 1966. In 1968, he studied law for a year at St Edmund Hall, Oxford, as a Rhodes scholar. Returning to Newfoundland, he began a master's degree in English, but did not complete it.

== Early career ==
Murphy first came to national attention in 1965, while attending Memorial University, during a nationally covered speech in Lennoxville, Quebec. Murphy characterized Newfoundland Premier Joey Smallwood's governing style as dictatorial and proclaimed his legislature's recent announcement of free tuition as a sham as it only covered the first year of a degree program. Smallwood warned the undergraduate student in a news conference not to return. Murphy did return, and was elected President of Memorial University Student Council. Smallwood's administration followed through with its promise – students were awarded both free tuition and an additional $50 monthly living allowance for those residing in St. John's ($100 for those living in the outports).

Murphy won a Progressive Conservative nomination in 1975. However, he abandoned it due to lack of funds. Instead, he went to work as special assistant to PC leader and Premier Frank Moores.

Murphy later switched parties in the 1980s and served two years as chief researcher for the provincial Liberal caucus before running for provincial office twice, as a Liberal. He stood for election in the 1985 general election in the riding of Placentia, and came in second, losing by 146 votes to William G. Patterson. The next year, he stood for election in a by-election in the riding of St. John's East. This time, he came in third, behind the successful New Democratic Party candidate, Gene Long, and the Progressive Conservative candidate, Shannie Duff.

== Canadian Broadcasting Corporation ==
Murphy was a frequent presence on the various branches of the CBC. In the 1970s, he worked as an interviewer on Here and Now which aired on CBC Radio in Newfoundland, and in Toronto, on the current affairs program Up Canada!

He returned to CBC in the 1990s and had regular commentary segments entitled "Point of View" on The National, CBC Television's flagship nightly news program. He was also the regular host of CBC Radio One's Cross Country Checkup, a nationwide call-in show, starting in 1994 and continuing for 21 years.

In 2004, he and nine other prominent Canadians participated in the production and the defence of a Great Canadian on the CBC Television program The Greatest Canadian. Murphy, advocating for former prime minister Pierre Trudeau, guided his candidate to third place in the final vote.

Murphy retired from Cross Country Checkup on 20 September 2015, and continued his commentary segments on The National until 28 June 2017.

After receiving several public complaints in 2014, the CBC's ombudsman investigated claims that Murphy may have been in conflict of interest by criticizing opponents of the Alberta oil sands in his "Point of View" segments while receiving money from the oil industry for paid speeches. In the final report and after an investigation, the CBC's ombudsman, Esther Enkin, did not say whether Murphy's speeches presented a conflict of interest but did conclude that "since taking money leads to a perception of a conflict of interest, CBC management might want to consider, in the review they are undertaking, whether even with disclosure, it is appropriate for CBC news and current affairs staff to get paid for their speaking engagements."

== Subsequent work ==
Murphy wrote a column for the Saturday edition of The Globe and Mail newspaper until January 2010, when the Globe cancelled the column and Murphy moved to the National Post, for which he continued to write until his death.

In October 2019, he launched RexTV, his own YouTube channel, in which he interviewed prominent figures in politics, business, academia, journalism, science and culture who might be ignored or misrepresented by the mainstream media.

== Views ==
In 2009, Murphy criticized the Liberal Party for proposing "green" policy responses to global warming. In 2020, Murphy criticized the Justin Trudeau–led Liberal government's response to the COVID-19 pandemic for creating a system in which the government is "without opposition, free to gush money wherever it wishes, in whatever amounts it chooses, to whomever it favours." In 2021, Murphy published a column calling the government "the worst Canadian government ever."

Murphy argued that climate change is "a sub-branch of climate politics". He criticized former US Vice President Al Gore's opposition to the Alberta oil sands and in a 2013 column, called the industry "a dazzling and profitable engineering endeavor of which all Canadians should be proud".

== Death ==
Murphy died from cancer on 9 May 2024 in Toronto, at the age of 77.

== Honours ==
In June 2008, Murphy was awarded an Honorary Doctor of Laws degree from the University of Waterloo. He was awarded honorary doctorates of letters by Memorial, St. Thomas, and Nipissing universities. In June 2013, he was awarded the Honorary Fellowship of the Canadian Institute of Management.

== See also ==
- List of newspaper columnists
