= 2016–17 Canadian network television schedule =

The 2016–17 network television schedule for the five major English commercial broadcast networks in Canada covers primetime hours from September 2016 through August 2017. The schedule is followed by a list per network of returning series, new series, and series canceled after the 2015–16 television season, for Canadian, American and other series.

CBC Television was first to announce its fall schedule on May 26, 2016, followed by CTV and CTV Two, as well as City on May 30, 2016, and Global on June 9, 2016. As in the past, the commercial networks' announcements come shortly after the networks have had a chance to buy Canadian rights to new American series.

CTV Two and Global are not included on Saturday as they do not carry network programming.

== Schedule ==
- New series are highlighted in **bold**. Series that have changed network are not highlighted as new series.
- All times given are in Canadian Eastern Time and Pacific Time (except for some live events or specials).
  - Most CBC programming airs at the same local time in all time zones, except Newfoundland time (add 30 minutes).
  - For commercial stations in the Central Time Zone, subtract one hour.
  - For commercial stations in the Atlantic and Mountain time zones, add one hour for programming between 8:00 and 10:00 PM. Programs airing at 10:00 PM ET/PT will generally air at 8:00 PM local on stations in these areas. For viewers in the Newfoundland time zone, add an additional 30 minutes to the Atlantic time schedule.
  - Notwithstanding the above, timeslots may occasionally vary further in some areas due to local simultaneous substitution considerations, compliance with watershed restrictions, or other factors.

== Legend ==
Light blue indicates Local Programming.
Grey indicates Encore Programming.
Light green indicates sporting events.
Orange indicates movies.
Red indicates Canadian content shows, which is programming that originated in Canada.
Magenta indicates series being burned off and other irregularly scheduled programs, including specials.
Cyan indicates various programming.
Light yellow indicates the current schedule.

=== Sunday ===
Network		7:00 PM	7:30 PM	8:00 PM	8:30 PM	9:00 PM	9:30 PM	10:00 PM	10:30 PM
CBC	Fall	Heartland		**This Is High School**		**This Life**		The National	
CBC	Follow-up	Heartland		Canada's Smartest Person		**This Life**		The National	
CBC	Winter	Heartland		The A Word		Michael: Every Day	Michael: Every Day	The National	
CBC	Late Winter	Heartland		The A Word		Interrupt This Program	Crash Gallery	The National	
CBC	Spring	Heartland		**Anne**		**Canada: The Story of Us**		The National	
City	Fall	Encore Programming	Bob's Burgers	**Nirvanna the Band the Show**	**Son of Zorn**	Family Guy	The Last Man on Earth	Encore Programming	
City	Spring	**Making History**	Bob's Burgers	Little Big Shots		Family Guy	The Last Man on Earth	Encore Programming	
CTV	Fall	NFL		Once Upon a Time		Secrets and Lies		Quantico	
CTV	Spring	Encore Programming		Once Upon a Time		**Time After Time**		Saving Hope (3/12)	
CTV Two		Encore Programming		Dancing with the Stars				Encore Programming	
Global	Fall	Superstore	The Simpsons	NCIS: Los Angeles		Madam Secretary		Elementary	
Global	Winter	**The Good Fight**		NCIS: Los Angeles		NCIS: Los Angeles		Shades of Blue	
Global	Spring	Elementary		NCIS: Los Angeles		**Chicago Justice**		Shades of Blue	
Global	Summer	Big Brother		Hockey Wives		NCIS: Los Angeles		Shades of Blue	

=== Monday ===
Network		8:00 PM	8:30 PM	9:00 PM	9:30 PM	10:00 PM	10:30 PM
CBC	Fall	Murdoch Mysteries		**Shoot the Messenger**		The National	
CBC	Winter	Murdoch Mysteries		**Pure**		The National	
CBC	Late Winter	Murdoch Mysteries		**Bellevue**		The National	
City	Fall	The Middle	The Real O'Neals	2 Broke Girls	The Odd Couple	Scorpion	
City	Winter	**24: Legacy**		2 Broke Girls	The Middle	Scorpion	
City	Spring	**24: Legacy**		2 Broke Girls (R)	2 Broke Girls	Scorpion	
CTV	Fall	Gotham		Lucifer		**Conviction**	
CTV	Winter	Encore Programming				Quantico	
CTV	Spring	The Voice				Quantico	
CTV Two		The Voice				Encore Programming	
Global	Fall	**Kevin Can Wait**	**Man with a Plan**	Chicago Fire		**Timeless**	
Global	Winter	The Simpsons	**Man with a Plan**	The Blacklist		**Timeless**	
Global	Spring	**Kevin Can Wait**	**Man with a Plan**	Big Brother Canada		**Taken**	
Global	Summer	**Kevin Can Wait**	The Simpsons	Private Eyes		**Midnight, Texas**	

=== Tuesday ===
Network		8:00 PM	8:30 PM	9:00 PM	9:30 PM	10:00 PM	10:30 PM
CBC	Fall	Rick Mercer Report	22 Minutes	**Kim's Convenience**	Mr. D	The National	
CBC	Winter	Rick Mercer Report	22 Minutes	Schitt's Creek	**Workin' Moms**	The National	
City	Fall	Brooklyn Nine-Nine	New Girl	Scream Queens		Encore Programming	
City	Winter	New Girl	**The Mick**	Bones		Encore Programming	
City	Spring	Brooklyn Nine-Nine	**The Mick**	Prison Break		Encore Programming	
CTV	Fall	The Flash		**This Is Us**		Agents of S.H.I.E.L.D.	
CTV	Spring	The Voice		**Trial & Error**	**Trial & Error** (3/7)	Agents of S.H.I.E.L.D.	
CTV Two	Fall	The Voice		Encore Programming			
CTV Two	Winter	The Flash		Legends of Tomorrow		Encore Programming	
Global	Fall	NCIS		**Bull**		NCIS: New Orleans	
Global	Winter	NCIS		**Bull**		**Ransom**	
Global	Spring	NCIS		**Bull**		Chicago Fire	
Global	Summer	NCIS		**Bull**		**Somewhere Between**	

=== Wednesday ===
Network		8:00 PM	8:30 PM	9:00 PM	9:30 PM	10:00 PM	10:30 PM
CBC	Fall	Dragons' Den		The Romeo Section		The National	
CBC	Winter	Dragons' Den		X Company		The National	
City	Fall	Lethal Weapon		Modern Family	Black-ish	Encore Programming	
City	Spring	**Shots Fired**		Modern Family	Black-ish	Encore Programming	
CTV	Fall	Blindspot		Criminal Minds		**Designated Survivor**	
CTV	Winter	Blindspot		Criminal Minds		**Cardinal**	
CTV	Spring	Blindspot		Criminal Minds		**Designated Survivor**	
CTV Two		Arrow		Law & Order: Special Victims Unit		Code Black	
Global	Fall	Survivor		Chicago Med		Chicago P.D.	
Global	Late Fall	Survivor		Rookie Blue		Chicago P.D.	
Global	Late Winter	Chicago Med		**Mary Kills People**		Chicago P.D.	
Global	Spring	Survivor		Big Brother Canada (3/15)		Chicago P.D.	
Global	Summer	Big Brother		**Salvation**		**Travelers**	

=== Thursday ===
Network		8:00 PM	8:30 PM	9:00 PM	9:30 PM	10:00 PM	10:30 PM
CBC		The Nature of Things		Firsthand		The National	
City	Fall	**Thursday Night Football** (continued to game completion)					
City	Follow-up	The Mindy Project	**Second Jen**	Mom	Life in Pieces	Encore Programming	
City	Winter	The Mindy Project	The Middle	Mom	Life in Pieces	Encore Programming	
City	Spring	The Real O'Neals	The Middle	Mom	Life in Pieces	Encore Programming	
CTV	Fall	Grey's Anatomy		**Notorious**		How to Get Away with Murder	
CTV	Follow-up	The Big Bang Theory	The Goldbergs	**Notorious**		How to Get Away with Murder	
CTV	Winter	The Big Bang Theory	**Powerless**	How to Get Away with Murder		**Training Day**	
CTV	Spring	The Big Bang Theory	**Powerless**	MasterChef Canada		**Training Day**	
CTV Two	Fall	Legends of Tomorrow		Encore Programming			
CTV Two	Winter	MasterChef Junior		Reign		Encore Programming	
CTV Two	Spring	MasterChef Junior		Reign		The Catch	
Global	Fall	Superstore	**The Good Place**	**Pitch**		The Blacklist	
Global	Follow-up	Superstore	**The Great Indoors**	**Pitch**		The Blacklist	
Global	Late fall	The Simpsons	**The Great Indoors**	**Pitch**		**Pure Genius**	
Global	Winter	Superstore	**The Great Indoors**	Chicago Med		The Blacklist	
Global	Late Winter	Superstore	**The Great Indoors**	Chicago Med		**The Blacklist: Redemption**	
Global	Spring	Big Brother Canada		Chicago Med		**The Blacklist: Redemption**	
Global	Summer	**The Wall**		Big Brother		The Night Shift	

=== Friday ===
Network		8:00 PM	8:30 PM	9:00 PM	9:30 PM	10:00 PM	10:30 PM
CBC	Fall	Marketplace	Hello Goodbye	The Fifth Estate		The National	
CBC	Late Winter	Marketplace	**True North Calling**	The Fifth Estate		The National	
City		Hell's Kitchen		Encore Programming			
CTV	Fall	Shark Tank		**The Exorcist**		Blue Bloods	
CTV	Winter	Grimm		Shark Tank		Blue Bloods	
CTV Two	Fall	The Vampire Diaries		Encore Programming			
CTV Two	Winter	The Vampire Diaries		Sleepy Hollow		Encore Programming	
Global	Fall	**MacGyver**		Hawaii Five-0		The Firm	
Global	Follow-up	**MacGyver**		Hawaii Five-0		**Pure Genius**	
Global	Late fall	**MacGyver**		Hawaii Five-0		Undercover Boss Canada	
Global	Winter	**MacGyver**		Hawaii Five-0		**Pure Genius**	
Global	Spring	**MacGyver**		Hawaii Five-0		Madam Secretary (3/10)	
Global	summer	**MacGyver**		Hawaii Five-0		**Ransom**	

=== Saturday ===
Network		8:00 PM	8:30 PM	9:00 PM	9:30 PM	10:00 PM	10:30 PM
CBC		Hockey Night in Canada					
City		Hockey Night in Canada					
CTV		Comedy Night on CTV					
Global	Fall	Various Programming					
Global	Winter	**Ransom**		Encore Programming			

== By network ==
=== CTV/CTV Two ===
Comedies

- American Housewife (October 11, 2016 – present)
- The Big Bang Theory (September 23, 2007 – present)
- The Goldbergs (September 26, 2013 – present)

Dramas

- Agents of S.H.I.E.L.D. (September 24, 2013 – present)
- Arrow (September 24, 2012 – present)
- Blindspot (September 21, 2015 – present)
- Blue Bloods (September 24, 2010 – present)
- Castle (September 29, 2009 – present)
- Code Black (September 29, 2015 – present)
- Conviction (October 3, 2016 – present)
- Criminal Minds (September 21, 2005 – present)
- Designated Survivor (September 23, 2016 – present)
- The Exorcist (September 23, 2016 – present)
- The Flash (January 17, 2015 – present)
- Gotham (September 22, 2014 – present)
- Grimm (October 28, 2011 – present)
- How to Get Away With Murder (September 25, 2014 – present)
- Law & Order: Special Victims Unit (September 19, 1999 – present)
- Legends of Tomorrow (January 12, 2016 – present)
- Lucifer (January 26, 2016 – present)
- Once Upon a Time (September 25, 2011 – present)
- Quantico (September 27, 2015 – present)
- Secrets and Lies (July 19, 2015 – present)
- This Is Us (September 21, 2016 – present)

Upcoming Programming

- The Mick (2017)
- Time After Time (2017)

=== Global ===
Comedy Programming

- The Great Indoors (October 27, 2016 – present)
- The Good Place (September 22, 2016 – present)
- Kevin Can Wait (September 19, 2016 – present)
- Man with a Plan (October 24, 2016 – present)
- The Simpsons (December 19, 1989 – present)
- Superstore (December 1, 2015 – present)

Drama Programming

- The Blacklist (September 23, 2013 – present)
- Bones (September 12, 2005 – present)
- Bull (September 21, 2016 – present)
- Chicago Fire (September 18, 2012 – present)
- Chicago Med (November 19, 2015 – present)
- Chicago P.D. (January 19, 2014 – present)
- Elementary (September 20, 2012 – present)
- Hawaii Five-0 (September 20, 2010 – present)
- MacGyver (September 23, 2016 – present)
- Madam Secretary (September 28, 2014 – present)
- NCIS (September 24, 2004 – present)
- NCIS: Los Angeles (September 22, 2009 – present)
- NCIS: New Orleans (September 21, 2014 – present)
- Pitch (September 22, 2016 – present)
- Pure Genius (October 27, 2016 – present)
- Timeless (October 3, 2016 – present)

Upcoming Programming

- Doubt (2017)
- Great News (2017)
- Powerless (2017)
- Training Day (2017)
- Trial & Error (2017)

== See also ==
- 2016–17 United States network television schedule
