= 5th Canadian Screen Awards =

5th year of awards given by the Academy of Canadian Cinema & Television

- Date: March 12, 2017
- Location: Sony Centre for the Performing Arts, Toronto
- Hosted by: Howie Mandel

Highlights
- Most awards: Film: It's Only the End of the World (6); TV: Orphan Black (9)
- Most nominations: Film: It's Only the End of the World (9); TV: Orphan Black (14)
- Best Motion Picture: It's Only the End of the World
- Best Dramatic Series: Orphan Black
- Best Comedy Series: Letterkenny

Television/radio coverage
- Network: CBC
- Produced by: Barry Avrich

The 5th annual Canadian Screen Awards were held on March 12, 2017, to honour achievements in Canadian film, television, and digital media production in 2016. Nominations were announced on January 17, 2017.

Awards in many of the technical categories were presented in a series of galas, collectively called Canadian Screen Week, in the days leading up to the main ceremony. At the main ceremony, the film It's Only the End of the World and the television series Orphan Black won the most awards in film and television categories, with six and nine awards, respectively.

== Broadcast ==
The ceremony was hosted by Howie Mandel. His performance was not well received by critics; Kate Taylor of The Globe and Mail criticized Mandel's recurring joke of dubbing the awards the STDs – for "Screen, television, Digital" – in response to the fact that the awards still do not have an official short-form name in the manner of "Oscar" for the Academy Awards, while Norman Wilner of NOW criticized Mandel's "hacky crowd work and even hackier bits", concluding that "I'm sure this stuff kills at Casino Rama, but when you're supposed to be anchoring an awards show it just seems cheap and lazy."

Both critics wrote that the broadcast's best moments came from various winners' moving and funny acceptance speeches, including Tatiana Maslany's emotional response to winning the award for Best Actress in a Film for The Other Half; Paul Sun-Hyung Lee's moving speech about how honoured he was to win Best Actor in a Comedy Series for Kim's Convenience, a series which celebrated the immigrant contribution to Canadian society; Christopher Plummer's grace and humility in accepting a lifetime achievement award; and Catherine O'Hara's decision to accept her award for Best Actress in a Comedy Series in character as Moira Rose from Schitt's Creek.

At the broadcast, George Stroumboulopoulos announced that beginning in 2018, the academy's annual award for Science or Nature Documentary Program would be named the Rob Stewart Award in memory of documentary filmmaker Rob Stewart, who died in January 2017.

== Film ==
Motion Picture	Direction
It's Only the End of the World (Juste la fin du monde) – Nancy Grant, Sylvain Corbeil, Xavier Dolan; Bad Seeds (Les mauvaises herbes) – Luc Vandal, Lorraine Dufour; Before the Streets (Avant les rues) – Chloé Leriche; Hello Destroyer – Daniel Domachowski, Haydn Wazelle; Old Stone – Xianjian Wu, Chi-an Lin, Jing Wang, Sarah Stallard; Operation Avalanche – Matthew Miller, Lee Kim, Matt Johnson; Race – Louis-Philippe Rochon, Dominique Séguin, Jean-Charles Lévy, Luc Dayan; Searchers (Maliglutit) – Zacharias Kunuk; Those Who Make Revolution Halfway Only Dig Their Own Graves (Ceux qui font les révolutions à moitié n'ont fait que se creuser un tombeau) – Hany Ouichou; Weirdos – Marc Almon, Mike MacMillan, Bruce McDonald	Xavier Dolan, It's Only the End of the World (Juste la fin du monde); Mathieu Denis and Simon Lavoie, Those Who Make Revolution Halfway Only Dig Their Own Graves (Ceux qui font les révolutions à moitié n'ont fait que se creuser un tombeau); Kevan Funk, Hello Destroyer; Matt Johnson, Operation Avalanche; Chloé Leriche, Before the Streets (Avant les rues)
Actor in a leading role	Actress in a leading role
Stephan James, Race; Jared Abrahamson, Hello Destroyer; Lawrence Barry, Riverhead; Chen Gang, Old Stone; Andrew Gillis, Werewolf	Tatiana Maslany, The Other Half; Nathalie Doummar, Boundaries (Pays); Carmen Ejogo, Born to Be Blue; Sasha K. Gordon, Natasha; Bhreagh MacNeil, Werewolf
Actor in a supporting role	Actress in a supporting role
Vincent Cassel, It's Only the End of the World (Juste la fin du monde); Henry Czerny, The Other Half; Evan Mercer, Riverhead; Jacques Newashish, Before the Streets (Avant les rues); Michael Reventar, Kidnap Capital	Molly Parker, Weirdos; Nathalie Baye, It's Only the End of the World (Juste la fin du monde); Kwena Bellemare-Boivin, Before the Streets (Avant les rues); Sherri Shepherd, Jean of the Joneses; Gabrielle Tremblay, Those Who Make Revolution Halfway Only Dig Their Own Graves (Ceux qui font les révolutions à moitié n'ont fait que se creuser un tombeau)
Original Screenplay	Adapted Screenplay
Daniel MacIvor, Weirdos; Kevan Funk, Hello Destroyer; Zacharias Kunuk, Searchers (Maliglutit); Johnny Ma, Old Stone; Stella Meghie, Jean of the Joneses	Xavier Dolan, It's Only the End of the World (Juste la fin du monde); Bachir Bensaddek, Montreal, White City (Montréal la blanche); David Bezmozgis, Natasha
Feature Length Documentary	Short Documentary
I Am the Blues — Daniel Cross, Bob Moore, Mila Aung-Thwin, Bruce Cowley; Gulîstan, Land of Roses — Zaynê Akyol, Fanny Drew, Sarah Mannering, Yanick Létourneau, Mehmet Aktas, Denis McCready; Koneline: Our Land Beautiful — Nettie Wild, Betsy Carson; The Prison in Twelve Landscapes — Brett Story; Waseskun — Steve Patry, Nathalie Cloutier, Denis McCready, Colette Loumède	This River — Katherena Vermette, Erika MacPherson, Alicia Smith, David Christensen; Frame 394 — Rich Williamson, Shasha Nakhai, Ed Barreveld; The Road to Webequie — Ryan Noth, Tess Girard; Stone Makers (Carrière) — Jean-Marc E. Roy, Colette Loumède, Denis McCready, Claudia Chabot; Tshiuetin — Caroline Monnet, Éric Cinq-Mars
Live Action Short Drama	Animated Short
Mutants — Alexandre Dostie, Hany Ouichou, Gabrielle Tougas-Fréchette; A Funeral for Lightning — Emily Kai Bock; Oh What a Wonderful Feeling — François Jaros, Fanny-Laure Malo; Star — Émilie Mannering, Fanny Drew, Sarah Mannering; Wild Skin (La Peau sauvage) — Ariane Louis-Seize, Jeanne-Marie Poulain, Hany Ouichou	Blind Vaysha — Theodore Ushev, Marc Bertrand; I Am Here — Eoin Duffy, Maral Mohammadian, Shirley Vercruysse; I Like Girls (J'aime les filles) — Diane Obomsawin, Marc Bertrand; Mamie — Janice Nadeau, Marc Bertrand, Corinne Destombes; Red of the Yew Tree (If ou le rouge perdu) — Marie-Hélène Turcotte, Félix Dufour-Laperrière
Art Direction/Production Design	Cinematography
Emmanuel Fréchette, Two Lovers and a Bear; André-Line Beauparlant, Bad Seeds (Les mauvaises herbes); David Brisbin, Isabelle Guay and Jean-Pierre Paquet, Race; Aidan Leroux and Joel Richardson, Born to Be Blue; Matt Likely, Weirdos	André Turpin, It's Only the End of the World (Juste la fin du monde); Glauco Bermudez, Before the Streets (Avant les rues); Josée Deshaies, Nelly; Leung Ming Kai, Old Stone; Scott Moore, Werewolf
Costume Design	Editing
Patricia McNeil, Nelly; Bethana Briffett, Weirdos; Mario Davignon, Race; Megan Oppenheimer, Operation Avalanche; Marjatta Nissinen, The Girl King	Richard Comeau, Two Lovers and a Bear; Michael Long, Old Stone; Ashley McKenzie, Werewolf; Claude Palardy, Bad Seeds (Les mauvaises herbes); Duff Smith, Weirdos
Overall Sound	Sound Editing
Claude La Haye, Luc Boudrias and Pierre-Jules Audet, Race; Sylvain Brassard, Michel Lecoufle, Stephen De Oliveira and Nicholas Gagnon, King Dave; Matt Chan, Operation Avalanche; Marcel Chouinard, Philippe Lavigne, Stéphane Bergeron, Shaun-Nicholas Gallagher and Louis Collin, Bad Seeds (Les mauvaises herbes); François Grenon, It's Only the End of the World (Juste la fin du monde)	Pierre-Jules Audet, Jérôme Décarie, Michelle Cloutier, Stan Sakell, Jean-François Sauvé, Mathieu Beaudin, François Senneville, Luc Raymond and Jean-Philippe Saint-Laurent, Race; Sylvain Brassard, Guy Francoeur, Benoît Dame and Guy Pelletier, It's Only the End of the World (Juste la fin du monde); Sylvain Brassard, Guy Pelletier and Christian Rivest, King Dave; Matt Chan, James Patrick and Frieda Bay, Operation Avalanche; Miguel Nunes, Ryan Thompson, Gina Mueller and Maureen Murphy, The Unseen
Achievement in Music: Original Score	Achievement in Music: Original Song
Todor Kobakov, Steve London and David Braid, Born to Be Blue; Alain Mayrand, Numb; Taymaz Saba, Window Horses; Michael White, Hevn (Revenge); Jesse Zubot, Two Lovers and a Bear	David Braid, "Could Have Been" – Born to Be Blue; Nikan Boivin, "Sokecimyekw" – Before the Streets (Avant les rues); Camille Poliquin and Laurence Lafond-Beaulne, "Natalie" – King Dave; Matthew Schellenberg, "Draw Blood" – Lovesick; Daniel Stimac, "Almost Had It All" – A Date with Miss Fortune
Make-Up	Visual Effects
Maïna Militza and Denis Vidal, It's Only the End of the World (Juste la fin du monde); Kathryn Casault, Two Lovers and a Bear; Lynda McCormack, Born to Be Blue; Melissa Meretsky, Jennifer Walton and Lisa Belyea, The Northlander; Natalie Trépanier and Réjean Goderre, Race	Martin Lipmann, Cynthia Mourou, Benoît Touchette, Jonathan Piché-Delorme and Frédéric Breault, Race; Bob Habros, Adele Venables, Julika Pape, Milos Djakovic, Adam Kube, Mike Wearing and Richard Darwin, The Unseen; Tristan Zerafa, Operation Avalanche
Best Cinematography in a Documentary	Best Editing in a Documentary
John Price, I Am the Blues; Joan Poggio, Gun Runners; Derek Rogers, The Skyjacker's Tale; Chris Romeike, Giants of Africa; Van Royko, Koneline: Our Land Beautiful	Dave De Carlo, Giants of Africa; Mathieu Bouchard-Malo, Gulîstan, Land of Roses; Michael Brockington, Koneline: Our Land Beautiful; Nathalie Lamoureux, Waseskun; Eric Pedicelli, Black Code
Best First Feature	Golden Screen Award
Johnny Ma, Old Stone	The 3 L'il Pigs 2 (Les 3 p'tits cochons 2)
John Dunning Discovery Award
Randall Okita, The Lockpicker

== Television ==
=== Programs ===
Drama series	Comedy series
Orphan Black; 19–2; Blood and Water; This Life; Vikings	Letterkenny; Kim's Convenience; Mohawk Girls; Mr. D; Schitt's Creek
Animated program or series	Documentary program
The Curse of Clara: A Holiday Tale; Beat Bugs; The Deep; Fangbone!	My Millennial Life; Hold Your Fire; Looking for Mike; Survivors Rowe; Wasted
Children's or youth fiction	Children's or youth non-fiction
Odd Squad; Backstage; Degrassi: Next Class; Make It Pop; Wild Kratts	Science Max; Gaming Show (In My Parents' Garage); We Are Savvy
Dramatic Mini-Series or TV Movie	History Documentary Program or Series
Murdoch Mysteries: A Merry Murdoch Christmas; Odd Squad: The Movie; Slasher; Unclaimed	War Story: Afghanistan; Newfoundland at Armageddon; The Pass System; Reunion of Giants
Performing arts program	Lifestyle Program or Series
The Taming of the Shrew; The Adventures of Pericles	You Gotta Eat Here!; CityLine; The Great Canadian Cookbook; Leave It to Bryan; Masters of Flip
Music Program or Series	Biography or Arts Documentary Program or Series
2016 Juno Awards; 2016 iHeartRadio Much Music Video Awards; We Day 2016	Hip-Hop Evolution; Interrupt This Program; Justice for MLK: The Hunt for James Earl Ray; Loretta Lynn: Still a Mountain Girl
Pre-School Program or Series	Reality/Competition Program or Series
PAW Patrol; The Adventures of Napkin Man; Kids' CBC Training Day; Peg + Cat; Scout and the Gumboot Kids	The Amazing Race Canada; Big Brother Canada; Canada's Smartest Person; Knock Knock Ghost; Masterchef Canada
Science or Nature Documentary Program or Series	Social/Political Documentary Program (Donald Brittain Award)
The Nature of Things – "Moose: A Year in the Life of a Twig Eater"; Kenya Wildlife Diaries; The Nature of Things – "My Brain Made Me Do It"; The Nature of Things – "Trapped in a Human Zoo"; Volcanic Odysseys	Guantanamo's Child: Omar Khadr; After the Last River; I, Pedophile; The War at Home
Factual Program or Series	Variety or sketch comedy program or series
Still Standing; Curse of the Frozen Gold; Keeping Canada Alive; Real Detective; This Is High School	Baroness von Sketch Show; The Beaverton; Canada's Walk of Fame 2015; This Hour Has 22 Minutes
Live entertainment special	Talk program or series
The Tragically Hip: A National Celebration; 4th Canadian Screen Awards; etalk @ The Oscars	The Marilyn Denis Show; etalk's Ultimate Oscar Guide 2016; InnerSPACE; The Social
Golden Screen Award for TV Drama/Comedy	Golden Screen Award for TV Reality Show
Murdoch Mysteries; Heartland; Motive; Private Eyes; Saving Hope	The Amazing Race Canada; Big Brother Canada; Canada's Worst Driver; Dragons' Den; Masterchef Canada

=== Actors ===
Lead actor, drama	Lead actress, drama
Adrian Holmes, 19–2; Louis Ferreira, Motive; Landon Liboiron, Frontier; Jason Momoa, Frontier; Eric Schweig, Blackstone	Tatiana Maslany, Orphan Black; Erica Durance, Saving Hope; Megan Follows, Reign; Kristin Lehman, Motive; Carmen Moore, Blackstone
Lead actor, comedy	Lead actress, comedy
Paul Sun-Hyung Lee, Kim's Convenience; Gerry Dee, Mr. D; Jared Keeso, Letterkenny; Dan Levy, Schitt's Creek; Eugene Levy, Schitt's Creek	Catherine O'Hara, Schitt's Creek; Andrea Bang, Kim's Convenience; Kim Cattrall, Sensitive Skin; Jennifer Dale, What Would Sal Do?; Jean Yoon, Kim's Convenience
Lead actor, television film or miniseries	Lead actress, television film or miniseries
Ben Carlson, The Taming of the Shrew; Steve Byers, Slasher; Evan Buliung, The Adventures of Pericles; Geraint Wyn Davies, Hamlet	Elle-Máijá Tailfeathers, Unclaimed; Sara Botsford, L.M. Montgomery's Anne of Green Gables; Millie Davis, Odd Squad: The Movie; Hélène Joy, Murdoch Mysteries: A Merry Murdoch Christmas
Supporting actor, drama	Supporting actress, drama
Kevin Hanchard, Orphan Black; Torben Liebrecht, X Company; Simu Liu, Blood and Water; Dan Petronijevic, 19–2; Evan Williams, Versailles	Wendy Crewson, Slasher; Lara Jean Chorostecki, X Company; Michelle Nolden, Saving Hope; Shailyn Pierre-Dixon, Between; Lauren Lee Smith, This Life
Supporting actor, comedy	Supporting actress, comedy
Andrew Phung, Kim's Convenience; Nathan Dales, Letterkenny; John Hemphill, Schitt's Creek; Ryan McDonald, What Would Sal Do?; Jonathan Torrens, Mr. D	Emily Hampshire, Schitt's Creek; Laine MacNeil, You Me Her; Kathleen Phillips, Mr. D; Naomi Snieckus, Mr. D; Mary Walsh, Sensitive Skin
Performance in a children's or youth program or series	Performance in a guest role, drama series
Brittany Raymond, The Next Step; Addison Holley, Annedroids; Sean Michael Kyer, Odd Squad; Jordan Lockhart, Hi Opie!; Jeni Ross, Lost and Found Music Studios	Ed Asner, Forgive Me; Julian Black Antelope, Blackstone; Christine Horne, Saving Hope; Gord Rand, Orphan Black; William Shatner, Murdoch Mysteries
Performance in an animated program or series	Performance in a variety or sketch comedy program or series
Martin Short, The Cat in the Hat Knows a Lot About That!; Saara Chaudry, The Curse of Clara: A Holiday Tale; Joe Cobden, Knuckleheads; Devan Cohen, Daniel Tiger's Neighbourhood; Dwayne Hill, Peg + Cat	Gord Downie, Rob Baker, Johnny Fay, Paul Langlois and Gord Sinclair, The Tragically Hip: A National Celebration; Alessia Cara, 2016 Juno Awards; Mark Critch, Cathy Jones, Susan Kent, Shaun Majumder and Meredith MacNeill, This Hour Has 22 Minutes; Carolyn Taylor, Meredith MacNeill, Aurora Browne and Jennifer Whalen, Baroness von Sketch Show; Whitehorse, 2016 Juno Awards

=== News and information ===
News special	News reportage, local
Global News, Fort McMurray Wildfire – Michael Fulmes, Deb Zinck, Kerry Powell, Darcy Craig, Kevin Jesus, Christine Meadows; CBC News, Canada Votes 2015 – Michael Gruzuk, Fred Parker, Tom Dinsmore, Bob Weiers, Angela Naus, Peter Mansbridge, Raj Ahluwalia, Sharon Musgrave; CBC Newfoundland and Labrador, Beaumont-Hamel 100th Anniversary – Lee Pitts, Peter Gullage, Christina Mayo, Rod Dobbin, Anthony Germain, Heather Hiscox; CTV News, Election 2015 – Anton Koschany, Lisa LaFlamme, Wendy Freeman, Scott Ferguson, Rosa Hwang, Allan Myers; Global News, Decision Manitoba – Brent Williamson, Jon Lovin, Tamara Forlanski, Heather Steele, Lauren McNabb	John Hua, Jill Krop and Doug Sydora, "Missing Plane Found" (Global News Vancouver); Natalie Clancy, Yvette Brend and Karen Burgess, "Online Revenge Arrest" (CBC News Vancouver at 6); Christina Stevens, Simon Ostler, Mackay Taggart and Kari Vierimaa (Global News Toronto); Heather Yourex-West, Leslie Wells and Jerry Favero, "Life and Death Decisions" (Global News Calgary)
News reportage, national	Local newscast
Nahlah Ayed, "Trapped at the Border" (CBC News); Dawna Friesen, Leslie Stojsic and Tristan Staddon, Global National; Lisa LaFlamme, Odai Sadik and Marc D'Amours, "On the Front Line: Iraq" (CTV News); Diana Swain, Timothy Sawa and Loir Ward, "Campus Sexual Harassment" (CBC News)	CBC News: Here and Now; CBC News: Toronto; CTV News Toronto; Global News Hour at 6 (Edmonton)
National newscast	News or information series
CBC News: The National; CBC News Now with Ian Hanomansing; CTV National News; Global National	Daily Planet; The Fifth Estate; Marketplace; W5
News anchor, local	News anchor, national
Daryl McIntyre, CTV News Edmonton; Andrew Chang, CBC News Vancouver at 6; Debbie Cooper, Jonathan Crowe and Ryan Snoddon, CBC News: Here and Now; Sophie Lui and Chris Gailus, Global BC News Hour; Tom Murphy and Amy Smith, CBC News Nova Scotia at 6	Lisa LaFlamme, CTV National News; Ian Hanomansing, CBC News Now; Heather Hiscox, CBC News Now
Host or interviewer, news or information program or series	News or information program
Wendy Mesley, CBC News: The National; Rosemary Barton, Power & Politics; Adrian Harewood, CBC News Ottawa; Peter Mansbridge, Mansbridge One on One; Kevin Newman, W5	W5: "Healing Hands"; CBC News: "Face to Face with the Prime Minister"; Marketplace: "Toxic Jewelry"
Host in a variety or reality competition program or series	Host in a lifestyle, talk or entertainment news program or series
Norm Macdonald, 4th Canadian Screen Awards; Jann Arden and Jon Montgomery, 2016 Juno Awards; Jessi Cruickshank, Canada's Smartest Person; Steve Patterson, The Great Canadian Screen Test; Chloe Wilde, Jus Reign and Jillea, 2016 iHeartRadio Much Music Video Awards	Jonny Harris, Still Standing; Noah Cappe, The Great Canadian Cookbook; Danielle Graham, eTalk Presents Adele; Anna Olson, Bake with Anna Olson; Dave Wilson and Kortney Wilson, Masters of Flip
News or information segment
Adrienne Arsenault, Carmen Merrifield, Dave Rae, Jamie Hopkins and Dominique Banoun, "Catching Up with the Farwans" (CBC News: The National); Tamar Weinstein, Gillian Findlay, Nil Köksal, Liz Rosch and Ghalia Bdwie, "The Boy on the Beach" (The Fifth Estate); Adrienne Arsenault, Michelle Gagnon and Jonathan Castell, "Captured in Carnage" (CBC News: The National); Nahlah Ayed, Richard Devey and Tracy Seeley, "Dirty Work" (CBC News: The National); Nick Purdon, Leonardo Palleja and Brenda Witmer, "Another Choice" (CBC News: The National)

=== Sports ===
Live sporting event coverage	Sports analysis or commentary
Trevor Pilling, Chris Irwin, Paul McDougall, Mike Dodson, Don Peppin and Karen Sebesta, Rio 2016; Paul Graham and Jon Hynes, 2015 Grey Cup; Ed Hall, Mark Askin and Ron Forsythe, 2016 Stanley Cup Finals, Game 6; Dan Gladman, Aaron Lafontaine, Paul Graham and Dave Stiff, NBA Eastern Conference Finals Game 4	Jack Armstrong, 2016 NBA Playoffs: Heat vs. Raptors Game 7; Glen Suitor, 2015 Grey Cup; Ray Ferraro, 2016 IIHF World Hockey Championship Gold Medal Game; Gregg Zaun, Blue Jays Central; Mark Tewksbury, Rio 2016
Sports host	Sports play-by-play
Scott Russell, Rio 2016; James Duthie, Free Agent Frenzy; Ron MacLean, Hometown Hockey; Brian Williams, Queen's Plate	Chris Cuthbert, 2015 Grey Cup; Gord Miller, 2016 IIHF World Hockey Championship Gold Medal Game; Buck Martinez, Blue Jays Baseball; Jim Hughson, Hockey Night in Canada; Mark Lee, Rio 2016
Sports feature segment	Sports opening
Josh Shiaman, Rick Westhead, Jason Wessel, Darren Oliver and Kevin Fallis, "Radical Play"; Josh Shiaman, Jason Wessel, Kevin Fallis, Sara Orlesky and Brent Blanchard, "Believe in Ryp"; Josh Shiaman, Jason Wessel, Brent Blanchard, Michael Farber, Matt Dorman and Gary Hawke, "El Presidente"; Stephen Brunt, Robert MacAskill, Kirt Berry, Mike Fleury and Marc LeBlanc, "Gordie Howe"; Stephen Brunt, Stephen Paine, Paul Sidhu, Alvin Sison and Marc Leblanc, "Ali Essay"	Jon Coleman, Phil Rzentkowski and Murray Wren, Toronto Raptors Playoff/Marcus Stroman; Phil Rzentkowski, Bryan Johnson and Murray Wren, Toronto Blue Jays Post Season Opening Tease; Chris Irwin, Tim Thompson and Jeff Shelegy, Rio 2016; Craig Chambers, Devon Burns and Brent Blanchard, Toronto Argonauts Season Opener
Sports program or series	
Stephen Brunt, Stephen Paine, Paul Sidhu, Alvin Sison, Steve Maich, Marc Leblanc, Muhammad Ali -The Greatest; Dugald Maudsley, P.J Naworynski, Marion Gruner, Mark Alberts, Jeff Morrow and Michael Grippo, Against All Odds: The RCAF Flyers; Robert Lang, Allen Booth and Rebecca Snow, The Equalizer; Ross Rheaume, Brent Blanchard, Michael Banani and Sean Pattendon, Journey to the Grey Cup: 2015 Edmonton Eskimos; Stephen Brunt, George Skoutakis, Marc Leblanc, Jason Wesel, Jimmy Yoo and Damian Kearns, Roberto Osuna: Sinaloa to the Show

=== Craft awards ===
Editorial research (Barbara Sears Award)	Visual research (Barbara Sears Award)
Nancy Lang, Michael Burtch, Joanie McGuffin, Gary McGuffin, Rebecca Middleton and Emma Hambly, Painted Land: In Search of the Group of Seven; Alex Williams, The Pass System; France Rivet, The Nature of Things: "Trapped in a Human Zoo"; Andrew Theobald, War Story: Afghanistan; Monika Delmos, The Nature of Things: "While You Were Sleeping"	Elizabeth Klinck and Liz Etherington, How to Change the World; Elspeth Domville, Against All Odds: The RCAF Flyers; Adam Benzine, Leslie Swift, Lindsay Zarwell and Elizabeth Klinck, Claude Lanzmann: Spectres of the Shoah; Leslie Morrison, The Fifth Estate: "The Fire Breather: The Rise and Rage of Donald Trump"; Drew Taylor and Matthew Taylor, Ron Taylor: Dr. Baseball
Make-Up	Costume Design
Elizabeth Kuchurean, Frontier – "Mushkegowuk Esquewu"; Jenny Arbour and Linda Preston, Reign – "Clans"; Joanne Jacobsen and Jo-Dee Thomson, Wynonna Earp – "Digging Up Bones"; Deb Drennan and Shirley Bond, Murdoch Mysteries – "Summer of '75"; Lynda McCormack and Renee Chan, Dark Matter – "Welcome to Your New Home"	Meredith Markworth-Pollack, Reign – "Clans"; Jennifer Haffenden, Wynonna Earp – "Keep the Home Fires Burning"; Alexander Reda, Murdoch Mysteries – "Unlucky in Love"; Andrea Flesch, X Company – "Black Flag"; Michael Ground, Frontier – "Wolves"
Photography in a comedy series	Photography in a documentary program or factual series
Douglas Koch, Sensitive Skin – "Episode 203"; Gerald Packer, Schitt's Creek – "Happy Anniversary"; Gerald Packer, Schitt's Creek – "Finding David"; Ian Bibby, Mr. D – "Gerry Turns 40"; Fraser Brown, Kim's Convenience – "Frank & Nayoung"	Mark Caswell, Real Vikings: Age of Invasion; Martin Buzora, Kenya Wildlife Diaries – "Vanishing Wilderness"; Hugo Kitching and Joshua J. See, The Nature of Things – "Moose: A Year in the Life of a Twig Eater"; Mark Ellam, Newfoundland at Armageddon; Barry Russell, Real Detective – "Darkness"
Photography in a drama program or series	Photography in a lifestyle or reality program or series
Aaron Morton, Orphan Black – "From Dancing Mice to Psychopaths"; Brendan Uegama, The Romeo Section – "A String of Pearls"; Fraser Brown, Blood & Water – "Episode 108"; Michael Storey, Reign – "In a Clearing"; Tobie Marier Robitaille, 19–2 – "Rescue"	Ryan Shaw, The Amazing Race Canada – "Who's Ready to Let It All Hang Out?"; Colin Evans, Love It or List It Vacation Homes – "Kelly & Brent"; Wesley Legge and Brian Stewart, Masters of Flip – "Color Code"; Les Stroud, Survivorman – "Lost on Park Trails – Patagonia"; Devin Lund, Tornado Hunters – "The Manitoba Monster"
Photography in a news or information program, series or segment	Photography in a variety or sketch comedy program or series
Richard Devey, CBC News: The National – "Ethiopia on Edge"; Rob Smith, APTN Investigates – "Defiance"; Hans Vanderzande and Ed Middleton, The Fifth Estate – "Why Didn't We Know?"; Jerry Vienneau, W5 – "Born Free"	Alex Nadon and Tyler Pigeon, The Tragically Hip: A National Celebration; Don Spence, Rick Mercer Report – "Episode Five"; D. Gregor Hagey, Sunnyside – "War Is Hell"; Ian Bibby, This Hour Has 22 Minutes – "Episode 6"; D. Gregor Hagey, HumanTown
Editing in a comedy program or series	Editing in a dramatic program or series
Kye Meechan, Kim's Convenience – "Gay Discount"; Erin Deck, Letterkenny – "Super Soft Birthday"; Duncan Christie, Letterkenny – "Ain't No Reason to Get Excited"; Trevor Ambrose, Schitt's Creek – "Moira's Nudes"; Trevor Ambrose, Schitt's Creek – "Happy Anniversary"	Jay Prychidny, Orphan Black – "The Scandal of Altruism"; Aaron Marshall, Vikings – "The Profit and the Loss"; Christopher Donaldson, vikings – "Kill the Queen"; Don Cassidy, Vikings – "The Last Ship"; Arthur Tarnowski, 19–2 – "Burn Pile"
Editing in a variety or sketch comedy program or series	Editing in a documentary program or series
Mike Fly and Jeremy LaLonde, Baroness von Sketch Show – "If the Killer is Watching"; Allan MacLean and Miles Davren, Rick Mercer Report – "Episode Nineteen"; Aren Hansen, HumanTown; Ken Yan and Jordan Lavigne, Canada's Walk of Fame 2015; Stephen Withrow and Christopher Minns, The Beaverton – "Episode 103"	Steve Taylor and Mark Staunton, Hip-Hop Evolution; Tiffany Beaudin, Claude Lanzmann: Spectres of the Shoah; Cathy Gulkin, Guantanamo's Child: Omar Khadr; Geoff Klein, Interrupt This Program – "Medellin"; Duncan Christie, Rock Icons – "Daryl Hall: The Soul Man"
Editing in a factual program or series	Editing in a reality or competition program or series
Sarah Cruise, This Is High School – "Grade 9 is the Worst Year"; Charles Fogel, Sarah Baptist and Morna Scott-Dunne, Marketplace – "Are We Racist?"; Derek Esposito, Hello Goodbye – "Second Chances"; Joshua Hendricks, Hello Goodbye – "Honour the Past"; Jason Schneider, Keeping Canada Alive – "Episode 1001"	Mike Tersigni, Ben O'Neil, Burak Ozgan, Jonathan Dowler and Allan Hughes, The Amazing Race Canada – "Who's Ready to Let it All Hang Out"; Mike Tersigni, Al Manson, Jonathan Dowler, Dave McMahon, Ryan Monteith and Cynthia Flengeris, The Amazing Race Canada – "Second place Isn't Good Enough"; Al Manson, Jordan Wood, Ryan Monteith, Baun Mah, Jonathan Dowler and Dave McMahon, Big Brother Canada – "Finale"; Baun Mah, Chopped Canada – "Redemption: Gone Too Soon"; Miles Davren, Dave McMahon and Allan Hughes, Masterchef Canada – "Season 3 Finale"
Production design/art direction in a fiction program or series	Production design/art direction in a non-fiction program or series
John Dondertman and Liz Calderhead, Orphan Black – "Human Raw Material"; Aidan Leroux and Rob Hepburn, Reign – "Spiders in a Jar"; Armando Sgrignuoli and Kent McIntyre, Murdoch Mysteries – "24 Hours til Doomsday"; Gordon Barnes, Frontier – "A Kingdom Unto Itself"; Ian Brock and Andy Loew, Dark Matter – "Welcome to Your New Home"	Brent Clark, The Tragically Hip – A National Celebration; Michael "Spike" Parks, 4th Canadian Screen Awards; Peter Faragher, Aaron Scholl and Andy Roskaft, Big Brother Canada – "Premiere"; Dave Roche and Andronico Del Rosario, Canada's Worst Driver – "Soaked and Wet"; David Blanchard, Don McEwen and Brendan Mahon, Real Detective – "Vengeance"
Sound in a fiction program or series	Sound in a non-fiction program or series
Jane Tattersall, Steve Medeiros, Brennan Mercer, David McCallum, Dale Sheldrake, Martin Lee, Kirk Lynds, Yuri Gorbachow, Daniel Birch, Goro Koyama and Jack Heeren, Vikings – "The Last Ship"; Alan deGraaf, Mike Woroniuk, Kevin Howard, Nathan Robitaille, J.R. Fountain, Jill Purdy, Richard Calistan, Joe Mancuso, Steve Hammon, Erick Culp and Zenon Waschuk, X Company – "Butcher and Bolt"; Tom Bjelic, Brad Zoern, Christian T. Cooke, Peter Persaud, Steve Baine, Dale Lennon, Mike Mancuso and Rachelle Audet, Dark Matter – "We Voted Not to Space You"; John Laing, Dale Lennon, Tom Bjelic, Marilee Yorston, Chris Guglick, Shaun Gratto, Marco Difelice and Herwig Gayer, Orphan Black – "The Scandal of Altruism"; Robert Labrosse, Jean Camden, Guillaume Boursier, Martin M Messier, Sebastien Bedard, Sabin Hudon and Jacques Plante, 19–2 – "Burn Pile"	Jeff Henschel and Ewan Deane, Sonic Magic: The Wonder and Science of Sound; Mark Krupka, The Amazing Race Canada – "Shine Your Light"; Ian Rodness, Steve Blair, Jeremy Kessler, Bruce Fleming and Dustin Harris, Guantanamo's Child: Omar Khadr; Chris McIntosh, Brayden McCluskey and Aaron Tchir, Highway Thru Hell – "War Zone"; Michael Filippov, Ryan Birnberg, Faustine Pelipel and Michael Bonini, Real Vikings: Age of Invasion
Sound in a variety or animated program or series	Visual effects
Jay Vicari, Peter Gary, Jon Erickson, Lee Moro and Mark Vreeken, The Tragically Hip: A National Celebration; Anthony Montano and Howard Baggley, We Day 2016; Jonny Ludgate, Jeff Davis, Melanie Eng and Ray Zhao, The Deep: Here Be Dragons; Howard Baggley, Simon Bowers, Doug McClement and Mark Vreeken, 2016 Juno Awards; John Lacina, Jeff Kozak, Doug McClement, Simon Bowers, Canada's Walk of Fame 2015	Dominic Remane, Bill Halliday, Michael Borrett, Kieran McKay, Jim Maxwell, Paul Wishart, Ovidiu Cinazan, Jeremy Dineen, Tom Morrison and Leann Harvey, Vikings – "The Last Ship"; Stephen Lebed, Jeff Skochko, Rob Vandenhoek, Max Bettie, Chris Cheeseman, Steve Ramone, JP Giamos, Mike Duffy, Dennis Ngariuku and Kristina Walker, Beauty and the Beast – "Au Revoir"; Michael Gibson, Tom Turnbull, Lara Osland, Anthony Paterson, Brandon Outhwaite, Shoban Narayanan, Tony Cybulski, Pranjal Choudhary, Geoff Marshall and Garloff Langenbeck, Killjoys – "How to Kill Friends and Influence People"; Geoff Scott, William Garrett, Sarah Wormsbecher, Eric Doiron, Nathan Larouche, Anthony DeChellis and Lon Molnar, Wynonna Earp – "I Walk the Line"; Geoff Scott, Sarah Wormsbecher, Eric Doiron, Nathan Larouche, Anthony DeChellis and Lon Molnar, Orphan Black – "From Dancing Mice to Psychopaths"
Casting	
Deirdre Bowen and Millie Tom, Kim's Convenience – "Frank & Nayoung"; Denise Chamain, Sara Kay, Jenny Lewis and Danielle Irvine, Frontier – "A Kingdom Unto Itself"; Deirdre Bowen, Frank Moiselle and Nuala Moiselle, Vikings – "Yol"; Jenny Lewis and Sara Kay, Letterkenny – "Rave"; Lisa Parasyn and Jon Comerford, Schitt's Creek – "Bob's Bagels"

=== Directing ===
Children's or youth	Comedy
Eleanore Lindo, Degrassi: Next Class: "#ThisCouldBeUsButYouPlayin"; J. J. Johnson, Odd Squad: "The First Day"; Zsolt Luka, The Mystery Files: "The Mystery Behind the Mask"; Ryan Marley, Science Max: "How You Build It"; Stefan Scaini, Odd Squad: "Failure to Lunch"	Jacob Tierney, Letterkenny: "Super Soft Birthday"; Jerry Ciccoritti, Schitt's Creek: "Moira's Nudes"; Tracey Deer, Mohawk Girls: "Pinó Noir"; Paul Fox, Schitt's Creek: "Happy Anniversary"; Peter Wellington, Kim's Convenience: "Gay Discount"
Documentary or factual series	Documentary program
Barry Stevens, War Story: Afghanistan: "The Long Way Home"; Oliver Aghaby, Interrupt This Program: "Beirut"; Sebastian Cluer, Still Standing: "Vanastra"; Mitchell Gabourie, Hello Goodbye: "Second Chances"; Darby Wheeler, Hip-Hop Evolution: "From the Underground to the Mainstream"	Patrick Reed and Michelle Shephard, Guantanamo's Child: Omar Khadr; Adam Benzine, Claude Lanzmann: Spectres of the Shoah; Phyllis Ellis, Girls Night Out; Susan Fleming, The Nature of Things – "Moose: A Year in the Life of a Twig Eater"; Jerry Rothwell, How to Change the World
Dramatic program or mini–series	Dramatic series
Michael McGowan, Murdoch Mysteries: A Merry Murdoch Christmas; Philippe Gagnon, Amber Alert; Shelagh O'Brien, Hamlet; Rachel Talalay, Unclaimed; Craig David Wallace, Slasher	John Fawcett, Orphan Black: "Transgressive Border Crossing"; Louis Choquette, 19–2: "Water"; Brad Peyton, Frontier: "A Kingdom Unto Thyself"; Helen Shaver, Vikings: "Promised"; Jeff Woolnough, Vikings: "The Last Ship"
Lifestyle program or mini–series	Live sporting event
Frank Samson, Vikings: "Season 4 Special"; Andrew Gregg, Imagining Canada; Heather Hawthorn Doyle, Love It Or List It Vacation Homes: "Margaret and Barbara"; Jim Morrison, You Gotta Eat Here!: "Florence"; Les Stroud, Survivorman: "Lost on Park Trails: Patagonia"	Andy Bouyoukos, 2015 Grey Cup; Andy Bouyoukos, 2016 IIHF World Junior Gold Medal Game; Ron Forsythe, Calgary Stampede; Sherali Najak, Rio 2016
Reality or competition program or series	Variety or sketch comedy program or series
Rob Brunner, The Amazing Race Canada: "For Those About to Rock"; Victor Kushmaniuk, Tornado Hunters: "The Manitoba Monster"; Dave Russell, Canada's Smartest Person: "Episode 208"; Dave Russell, Big Brother Canada: "Finale"; Frank Samson, Ultimate Survivor Adventure	Dave Russell, The Tragically Hip: A National Celebration; Vivieno Caldinelli and Michael Lewis, This Hour Has 22 Minutes: "Episode 6"; Henry Sarwer-Foner, Rick Mercer Report: "Episode 7"; Henry Sarwer-Foner and Shelagh O'Brien, The Beaverton: "Episode 3"; Aleysa Young, Baroness von Sketch Show: "Last Year You Weren't Forty"
Animated program or series
Jamie Whitney, PAW Patrol: "Pups Save Friendship Day"; Harold Harris, Justin Time: "Babushka's Bear"; Paul Hunt, The Cat in the Hat Knows a Lot About That!: "The Cat in the Hat Knows a Lot About Camping!"; Phillip Stamp and William Gordon, Inspector Gadget: "Gadget 2.0"; Rich Weston, Fugget About It: "What the F#@k is the Grey Cup"

=== Music ===
Non-fiction program or series	Original score for a program
Mark Korven, Guantanamo's Child: Omar Khadr; Lesley Barber, How to Change the World; Geoff Bennett, Andre Hirz and Mary Margaret O'Hara, The Nature of Things – "Moose: A Year in the Life of a Twig Eater"; Joel Goodman, Claude Lanzmann: Spectres of the Shoah; John Welsman, Painted Land: In Search of the Group of Seven	Robert Carli, Murdoch Mysteries: A Merry Murdoch Christmas; Paul Buckley, Odd Squad: The Movie; James Gelfand and Louise Tremblay, Crossfire; Lawrence Shragge, L.M. Montgomery's Anne of Green Gables; Jeff Toyne, Love Under the Stars
Original score for a series	
Trevor Yuile, Orphan Black: "The Scandal of Altruism"; Amin Bhatia and Ari Posner, X Company: "Black Flag"; Robert Carli and Peter Chapman, Wynonna Earp: "House of Memories"; Nicolas Maranda, 19–2: "City"; Schaun Tozer, The Romeo Section: "The China Shop"

=== Writing ===
Children's or youth	Comedy
Alejandro Alcoba, Degrassi: Next Class: "#YesMeansYes"; Adam Barken, Bruno & Boots: "Go Jump in the Pool"; Ken Cuperus, The Stanley Dynamic: "The Stanley Wild Weekend"; J. J. Johnson and Christin Simms, Annedroids: "The Mother of Invention, Part 2"; Tim McKeon, Odd Squad: "The First Day"	Jacob Tierney and Jared Keeso, Letterkenny: "Super Soft Birthday"; Garry Campbell, Kim's Convenience: "Ddong Chim"; Ins Choi and Kevin White, Kim's Convenience: "Gay Discount"; Andrew DeAngelis, What Would Sal Do?: "Punches Pilot"; Cynthia Knight, Mohawk Girls: "Going Native"
Documentary	Dramatic program or miniseries
Richard O'Regan, The Woman Who Joined the Taliban; Ralph Chapman and Sam Dunn, Rock Icons: "Geddy Lee: The Maestro"; Jerry Rothwell, How to Change the World; Shelley Saywell, The War at Home	Peter Mitchell, Murdoch Mysteries: A Merry Murdoch Christmas; Susan Coyne, L.M. Montgomery's Anne of Green Gables; James Phillips and Doug Barber, Swept Under; Martha Williamson and Brandi Harkonen, Signed, Sealed, Delivered: From Paris with Love
Drama series	Factual program or series
Graeme Manson, Orphan Black: "The Collapse of Nature"; Emily Andras, Wynonna Earp: "Purgatory"; Russ Cochrane, Orphan Black: "Transgressive Border Crossing"; Aubrey Nealon, Orphan Black: "The Stigmata of Progress"; Bruce M. Smith, 19–2: "Water"	Jonny Harris, Fraser Young and Steve Dylan, Still Standing: "Vanastra"; Tim Doiron, Real Detective: "Malice"; Catharine Parke, Ed Hatton, Lisa Cichelly and Saskia de Boer, Polar Bear Town: "Quest for the Cubs"; Julia Nunes, Mayday: "Fatal Delivery"; Todd Serotiuk and Catharine Parke, Highway Thru Hell: "My Purpose is to Protect"
Lifestyle or reality/competition program or series	Variety or sketch comedy program or series
Mark Lysakowski, Rob Brunner and Jennifer Pratt, The Amazing Race Canada: "Toads! Are You Kidding Me?"; Chris Benisch and Cathie James, Masterchef Canada: "Yes, No, Maybe So"; Andrew Fedosov and Maia Filar, Food Factory: "Easy as ABC"; Les Stroud, Survivorman: "Lost on Park Trails: Patagonia"; Andrew Younghusband, Canada's Worst Driver: "The Checkered Flag"	Carolyn Taylor, Meredith MacNeill, Jennifer Whalen, Jennifer Goodhue, Dawn Whitwell, Monica Heisey and Mae Martin, Baroness von Sketch Show: "I Can't Believe This Used to Take Days"; Mike Allison, Mark Critch, Bob Kerr, Greg Thomey, Jon Blair, Tim Polley, Heidi Brander, Adam Christie, Scott Vrooman, Jeremy Woodcock, Dean Jenkinson, Cathy Jones and Mary Walsh, This Hour Has 22 Minutes: "Episode 3"; Jeff Detsky, Luke Gordon Field, Jacob Duarte Spiel and Alexander Saxton, The Beaverton: "Episode 103"; Rick Mercer, Rick Currie, Greg Eckler, Chris Finn, Tim Steeves and George Westerholm, Rick Mercer Report: "Episode 7"; Dan Redican, Gary Pearson, Kathleen Phillips, Jan Caruana, Alastair Forbes and Pat Thornton, Sunnyside: "Volcano"
Animated program or series	
Craig Martin, Nerds and Monsters: "Bee-Hive Yourself"; Michel Beaudet and Bobby Theodore, Knuckleheads: "The Revenge of Jack Curtis"; Richard Elliott and Simon Racioppa, Fangbone!: "The Field Trip of Mayhem"; Alex Ganetakos, Total Drama Presents: The Ridonculous Race: "Bahamarama"; Mike Kiss, Fangbone!: "The Polluted Light of Destiny"	

== Digital media ==
Immersive Experience	Original Interactive Production
Nomads; Cardboard Crash; Cut-Off; The Unknown Photographer	I Love Potatoes; The Deeper They Bury Me; The Incredible Tales of Weirdwood Manor; Seances; Sons of Gallipoli
Original Program or Series, fiction	Original Program or Series, Non-Fiction
The Amazing Gayl Pile; Inhuman Condition; Newborn Moms; Petrol; Yidlife Crisis	Vice Canada Reports; Kenny Hotz's Getting an Election; Queer Hutterite; True Dating Stories
Cross-Platform Project, fiction	Cross-Platform Project, Non-Fiction
Wynonna Earp Interactive; Ride Along with Nick & Ben; X Company: Animated	Canada's Smartest Person; Bugs on the Menu; Finding Refuge (CBC News: British Columbia); Home to Win: Integrated Digital Strategy; My Millennial Life
Cross-Platform Project, Children's	Direction
Science Max Interactive; Backstage: Too Much Keaton; Fangbone: The Billbarians; Look Kool Online; Total Drama Presents: 'Donculous Dash	Morgan Waters and Brooks Gray, The Amazing Gayl Pile; Kevin Eastwood, The Death Debate; Andy King and Andrew Ferguson, True Dating Stories; Laura O'Grady, Queer Hutterite; Rich Williamson, Frame 394
Actor	Actress
Paul Soles, My 90-Year-Old Roommate; Eli Battalion, Yidlife Crisis; Jamie Elman, Yidlife Crisis; Kane Mahon, Petrol; Jesse Rath, The Brief	Melissa D'Agostino, Tactical Girls; Nadine Djoury, Newborn Moms; Amber Goldfarb, LARPs; Lindsey Middleton, Counselling Vanessa; Emily Piggford, That's My DJ

== Multiple nominations and awards ==
Films that received multiple nominations
Nominations	Film
9	It's Only the End of the World
8	Race
6	Before the Streets
6	Operation Avalanche
6	Weirdos
5	Born to Be Blue
5	Old Stone

Films that received multiple awards
Awards	Film
6	It's Only the End of the World
4	Race
2	Born to Be Blue
2	I Am the Blues
2	Two Lovers and a Bear
2	Weirdos

Shows that received multiple nominations
Nominations	Show
14	Orphan Black
13	Schitt's Creek
11	Kim's Convenience
10	19–2
9	Vikings
8	CBC News: The National
8	Letterkenny
7	Frontier
7	The Amazing Race Canada
6	Mr. D
6	Rio 2016
6	The Tragically Hip: A National Celebration
6	Wynonna Earp
5	2016 Juno Awards
5	Baroness von Sketch Show
5	Guantanamo's Child: Omar Khadr
5	Murdoch Mysteries: A Merry Murdoch Christmas
5	Odd Squad
5	Reign
5	Slasher
5	This Hour Has 22 Minutes
5	X Company

Shows that received multiple awards
Awards	Show
9	Orphan Black
5	CBC News: The National
6	The Amazing Race Canada
4	Kim's Convenience
4	Murdoch Mysteries: A Merry Murdoch Christmas
4	The Tragically Hip: A National Celebration
3	Baroness von Sketch Show
3	Guantanamo's Child: Omar Khadr
3	Letterkenny
3	Still Standing

== Special awards ==
Several special awards were given:

- board of directors' Tribute: Helga Stephenson
- Earle Grey Award: Tantoo Cardinal
- Fan Choice Award: Natasha Negovanlis
- Gordon Sinclair Award: Simcha Jacobovici
- Icon Award: Just for Laughs
- Lifetime Achievement Award: Christopher Plummer
