= 2015–16 Canadian network television schedule =

The 2015–16 network television schedule for the five major English commercial broadcast networks in Canada covers primetime hours from September 2015 through August 2016. The schedule is followed by a list per network of returning series, new series, and series canceled after the 2014–2015 television season, for Canadian, American and other series.

CBC Television was the first to announce its fall schedule on May 28, 2015, followed by Global on June 1, 2015 and Citytv on June 2, 2015; this was followed by CTV and CTV Two on June 4. As in the past, the commercial networks' announcements come shortly after the networks have had a chance to buy Canadian rights to new American series.

== Legend ==
Light blue indicates Local Programming.
Grey indicates Encore Programming.
Light green indicates sporting events.
Orange indicates movies.
Red indicates Canadian content shows, which is programming that originated in Canada.
Magenta indicates series being burned off and other irregularly scheduled programs, including specials.
Cyan indicates Various Programming.
Yellow indicates the current schedule.

== Schedule ==
- New series are highlighted in **bold**. Series that have changed network are not highlighted as new series.
- All times given are in Canadian Eastern Time and Pacific Time (except for some live events or specials).
  - Most CBC programming airs at the same local time in all time zones, except Newfoundland time (add 30 minutes).
  - For commercial stations in the Central Time Zone, subtract one hour.
  - For commercial stations in the Atlantic and Mountain time zones, add one hour for programming between 8:00 and 10:00 PM. Programs airing at 10:00 PM ET/PT will generally air at 8:00 PM local on stations in these areas. For viewers in the Newfoundland time zone, add an additional 30 minutes to the Atlantic time schedule.
  - Notwithstanding the above, timeslots may occasionally vary further in some areas due to local simultaneous substitution considerations, compliance with watershed restrictions, or other factors.

=== Sunday ===
PM		7:00	7:30	8:00	8:30	9:00	9:30	10:00	10:30
CBC		Heartland		Canada's Smartest Person		**Keeping Canada Alive**		The National	
Citytv		Encore Programming	Bob's Burgers	Sunnyside	Brooklyn Nine-Nine	Family Guy	**The Last Man on Earth**	Encore Programming	
CTV		NFL	NFL Game Day	Once Upon a Time		**Blood & Oil**		**Quantico**	
CTV Two		Encore Programming		Dancing with the Stars				Encore Programming	
Global	Fall	The Simpsons		Madam Secretary		The Good Wife		Bones	
Global	Winter	**Angel from Hell**	The Simpsons	Madam Secretary		NCIS: Los Angeles		**Shades of Blue**	
Global	Spring	Border Security		Big Brother Canada		Madam Secretary		NCIS: Los Angeles	
Global	Summer	The Simpsons		Big Brother		Madam Secretary		**BrainDead**	

=== Monday ===
PM		8:00	8:30	9:00	9:30	10:00	10:30
CBC		Murdoch Mysteries		**This Life**		The National	
Citytv	Fall	**The Muppets**	**Life in Pieces**	Scorpion		Encore Programming	Encore Programming
Citytv	Follow-up	**The Muppets**	The Middle (10/2)	Scorpion		Encore Programming	Encore Programming
CTV		Gotham		**Blindspot**		Castle	
CTV Two		The Voice				Hot In Cleveland (R)	
Global	Fall	**Supergirl**		**Minority Report**		NCIS: Los Angeles	
Global	Winter	**Crazy Ex-Girlfriend**		**Minority Report**		**Chicago Med**	
Global	Spring	Bones		NCIS: New Orleans		**Houdini & Doyle**	
Global	Summer	The Night Shift		**Crazy Ex-Girlfriend**		Hawaii Five-0	

=== Tuesday ===
PM		8:00	8:30	9:00	9:30	10:00	10:30
CBC		Rick Mercer Report	This Hour Has 22 Minutes	**Young Drunk Punk**	**Raised by Wolves**	The National	
Citytv		**Grandfathered**	**The Grinder**	**Scream Queens**		Encore Programming	
CTV		The Flash		Agents of S.H.I.E.L.D.		CSI: Cyber	
CTV Two		The Voice		Reign		**Best Time Ever with Neil Patrick Harris**	
Global	Fall	NCIS		NCIS: New Orleans		**Limitless**	
Global	Winter	Chicago Fire		NCIS		**Limitless**	
Global	Spring	NCIS		The Night Shift		**Maya & Marty**	
Global	Summer	NCIS		**Private Eyes**		NCIS: New Orleans	

=== Wednesday ===
PM		8:00	8:30	9:00	9:30	10:00	10:30
CBC		Dragons' Den		**The Romeo Section**		The National	
Citytv		Empire		Modern Family	Black-ish	Encore Programming	
CTV		Arrow		Criminal Minds		**Code Black**	
CTV Two		The Mysteries of Laura		Law & Order: Special Victims Unit		Encore Programming	
Global	Fall	Survivor		**Heartbeat**		Chicago P.D.	
Global	Winter	NCIS		**Superstore**	**The Carmichael Show**	Chicago P.D.	
Global	Spring	Survivor		Big Brother Canada		**Containment**	
Global	Summer	Big Brother		**You, Me and the Apocalypse**		**American Gothic**	

=== Thursday ===
PM		8:00	8:30	9:00	9:30	10:00	10:30
CBC		The Nature of Things		**First Hand**		The National	
Citytv	Fall	**Thursday Night Football** (continued to game completion)					
Citytv	Follow-up	Mr. D (11/5)	**Life in Pieces** (11/5)	Mom (11/5)	The Mindy Project (11/5)	Encore Programming	
CTV		The Big Bang Theory	The Goldbergs	Saving Hope		How to Get Away with Murder	
CTV Two		The Vampire Diaries		Sleepy Hollow		Encore Programming	
Global	Fall	**Heroes Reborn**		The Blacklist		Elementary (11/5)	
Global	Winter	Border Security	**Telenovela**	NCIS: New Orleans		Elementary (11/5)	
Global	Spring	Big Brother Canada		**Game of Silence**		Elementary (11/5)	
Global	Summer	**Spartan: Ultimate Team Challenge**		Big Brother		Vikings	

=== Friday ===
PM		8:00	8:30	9:00	9:30	10:00	10:30
CBC	Fall	Marketplace	**Crash Gallery**	The Fifth Estate		The National	
CBC	Follow-up	Marketplace	**Interrupt This Program** (11/6)	The Fifth Estate		The National	
Citytv		**Undateable**		World's Funniest Fails		Encore Programming	
CTV		The Amazing Race		Grimm		Blue Bloods	
CTV Two		MasterChef Junior (11/6)		Shark Tank		Encore Programming	
Global	Fall	**Angel from Hell**	**Truth Be Told**	Hawaii Five-0		Hell's Kitchen	
Global	Winter	Bones		Hawaii Five-0		Hell's Kitchen	
Global	Spring	The Blacklist		Hawaii Five-0		**Chicago Med**	
Global	Summer	NCIS: Los Angeles		Hawaii Five-0		The Firm	

=== Saturday ===
PM	8:00	8:30	9:00	9:30	10:00	10:30
CBC	Hockey Night in Canada					
Citytv	Hockey Night in Canada					
CTV	Comedy Night on CTV				Encore Programming	

== By network ==
=== CBC Television ===
Canadian series:

Returning series:

- Canada's Smartest Person
- Dragons' Den
- The Fifth Estate
- Heartland
- Hello Goodbye
- Hockey Night in Canada
- Jekyll and Hyde
- Just for Laughs
- Marketplace
- Murdoch Mysteries
- Mr. D
- The National
- The Nature Of Things
- Rick Mercer Report
- Schitt's Creek
- Still Standing
- This Hour Has 22 Minutes
- X Company

New series:

- Crash Gallery
- Exhibitionists
- First Hand
- Interrupt This Program
- Keeping Canada Alive
- The Romeo Section
- This Life
- Young Drunk Punk (second run)

Not returning from 2014 to 2015:

- Strange Empire

Other series:

Returning series:

- Coronation Street

New series:

- Please Like Me
- Raised by Wolves

Not returning from 2014 to 2015:

=== Citytv ===
Canadian series:

Returning series:

- Sunnyside
- Young Drunk Punk

New series:

- Mr. D (second run)

Not returning from 2014 to 2015:

American series:

Returning series:

- 2 Broke Girls
- The Bachelor
- Black-ish
- Brooklyn Nine-Nine
- Empire
- Hell's Kitchen
- The Middle
- Mike & Molly (also on CTV)
- The Mindy Project
- Modern Family
- Mom
- New Girl
- Scorpion
- World's Funniest Fails

New series:

- Bob's Burgers (moved from Global)
- Bordertown
- Cooper Barrett's Guide to Surviving Life
- Family Guy (moved from Global)
- Grandfathered
- The Grinder
- The Last Man on Earth
- Life in Pieces
- Little Big Shots
- The Muppets
- Rush Hour
- Scream Queens
- Thursday Night Football
- Undateable

Not returning from 2014 to 2015:

- Scandal

=== CTV/CTV Two ===
Canadian series:

Returning series:

- etalk
- MasterChef Canada
- Motive
- Saving Hope
- W5

New series:

Not returning from 2014 to 2015:

American series:

Returning series:

- Agents of S.H.I.E.L.D.
- The Amazing Race
- Arrow
- The Big Bang Theory
- Blue Bloods
- Castle
- Criminal Minds
- CSI: Cyber
- Dancing with the Stars
- The Flash
- The Goldbergs
- Gotham
- Grey's Anatomy
- Grimm
- Hot in Cleveland
- How to Get Away with Murder
- Law & Order: Special Victims Unit
- MasterChef Junior
- Mike & Molly (also on Citytv)
- The Mysteries of Laura
- NFL GameDay
- NFL on Fox
- Once Upon a Time
- Reign
- Shark Tank
- The Vampire Diaries
- The Voice

New series:

- Best Time Ever with Neil Patrick Harris
- Blindspot
- Blood & Oil
- The Catch
- Code Black
- Legends of Tomorrow
- Lucifer
- Sleepy Hollow (moved from Global)
- Quantico

Not returning from 2014 to 2015:

=== Global ===
Canadian series:

Returning series:

- Big Brother Canada
- Entertainment Tonight
- Entertainment Tonight Canada

New series:

- The Code
- Houdini and Doyle

Not returning from 2014 to 2015:

- Rookie Blue

American series:

Returning series:

- The Blacklist
- Bones
- Chicago Fire
- Chicago P.D.
- Elementary
- The Good Wife
- Hawaii Five-0
- Madam Secretary
- NCIS
- NCIS: Los Angeles
- NCIS: New Orleans
- Survivor
- The Simpsons

New series:

- Angel from Hell
- Chicago Med
- Containment
- Heartbeat
- Heroes Reborn
- Limitless
- Minority Report
- Shades of Blue
- Supergirl
- Telenovela
- Truth Be Told

Not returning from 2014 to 2015:

- Bob's Burgers (moved to Citytv)
- Family Guy (moved to Citytv)
- Sleepy Hollow (moved to CTV)
