= 2015 in Canadian television =

The following is a list of events affecting Canadian television in 2015. Events listed include television show debuts, finales, cancellations, and channel launches, closures and rebrandings.

== Events ==
=== Notable events ===
==== January ====
Date	Event
8	Global News suspends Leslie Roberts, the anchor and executive editor of its local newscasts on flagship station CIII-DT, after a Toronto Star investigation reveals that he is also a silent partner in a public relations firm which was regularly placing its clients on his own programs.
26	CTV suspends all scheduled broadcasts of the new season of its sitcom Spun Out, after cast member J. P. Manoux is arrested on charges of voyeurism.

==== February ====
Date	Event
13	The Quebecor Media-owned news channel Sun News Network ceases broadcasting.

==== March ====
Date	Event
1	The 3rd Canadian Screen Awards airs on CBC.

==== April ====
Date	Event
12	Kevin Bazinet wins the third season of La Voix.I
16	Broadcaster Corus Entertainment announced that it had reached an agreement with the Disney–ABC Television Group to acquire long-term, Canadian multi-platform rights to distribute Disney Channel's programming library and associated brands. As a result, Canadian versions of Disney Channel in English and French would launch on September 1, 2015.

==== May ====
Date	Event
12	Sarah Hanlon wins season 3 of Big Brother Canada.
20	Corus Entertainment announces that its three CBC Television affiliate stations in Ontario — CHEX-DT in Peterborough, CHEX-TV-2 in Oshawa and CKWS-DT in Kingston — will switch their affiliation to CTV effective August 31. Legally, the affiliation deal is described by Corus as a "program supply agreement" (the term "affiliation" has specific legal implications under CRTC rules), as Corus maintains editorial control over the stations' programming and the ability to sell local advertising, and is not delegating responsibility for CTV programs aired by the stations to Bell Media, CTV's parent company.

==== June ====
Date	Event
1	After 15 years, Cogeco officially signs Bpm:tv off the air.
9	The Canadian Broadcasting Corporation fires Evan Solomon, the host of Power & Politics on CBC News Network and The House on CBC Radio One, after the Toronto Star publishes conflict of interest allegations that Solomon was using his journalistic connections for personal benefit by running a private art sales brokerage business for clients including past interview guests on his CBC shows.

==== December ====
Date	Event
11	CHCH-DT announces that due to the bankruptcy of its production entity, Channel 11 L.P., created by Channel Zero, which in turned stemmed from the loss of federal subsidy and an inability to draw "national advertising revenue" to a local station, the station's news department would experience major cutbacks; the station's daytime rolling news blocks and all weekend newscasts were immediately canceled. The station's morning newscast (Morning Live) and its 6:00 and 11:00 evening newscasts will continue.

== Television programs ==
=== Programs debuting in 2015 ===
Start date	Show	Channel	Source
January 3	Guilt Free Zone	APTN	
January 7	The Book of Negroes	CBC Television	
January 9	Sports on Fire	HBO Canada	
January 8	The Expandables	HGTV	
January 8	Sunnyside	City	
January 13	Schitt's Creek	CBC Television	
January 21	Young Drunk Punk	City; CBC Television	
February 2	Songs of Freedom	Vision TV	
February 18	X Company	CBC	
March 17	Game of Homes	W	
May 4	Game On	YTV	
May 12	Masters of Flip	W	
May 21	Between	City	
June 23	Fool Canada	CBC Television	
June 23	Still Standing	CBC Television	
August 31	Chef in Your Ear	The Food Network	
September 1	First Dates Canada	Slice	
October 2	Crash Gallery	CBC Television	
October 4	Exhibitionists	CBC Television	
October 4	Keeping Canada Alive	CBC Television	
October 5	This Life	CBC Television	
October 14	The Romeo Section	CBC Television	
November 6	Interrupt This Program	CBC Television	
November 8	Blood and Water	OMNI	
Date unknown	Le nouveau show	ARTV, Ici Radio-Canada Télé	

=== Changes of network affiliation ===
Show	Moved from	Moved to
Fugget About It	Teletoon at Night	Adult Swim

=== Programs ending in 2015 ===
End date	Show	Channel	First aired	Status	Source
January 29	Detentionaire	Teletoon	2011	Ended	
May 25	Grojband	Teletoon	2013	Canceled	
July 11	Packages from Planet X	Teletoon	2014	Canceled	
July 16	Steven and Chris	CBC	2008	Canceled	
July 29	Rookie Blue	Global Television Network	2010	Ended	

== Television stations ==
=== Stations changing network affiliation ===
Date	Market	Station	Channel	Prior affiliation	New affiliation	Source
August 31	Peterborough, Ontario	CHEX-DT	12.1	CBC	CTV, Global (secondary)	
August 31	Kingston, Ontario	CKWS-DT	11.1	CBC	CTV, Global (secondary)	
August 31	Oshawa, Ontario	CHEX-TV-2	22 (analog)	CBC	CTV, Global (secondary)	

=== Network conversions and rebrandings ===
Old network name	New network name	Type	Conversion date	Notes
Bite	Makeful		August 24	
Teletoon Retro	Cartoon Network and Disney Channel		September 1	
Disney Junior	Family Jr.		September 18	DHX Media was acquiring the Disney rights to Corus Entertainment.
Disney XD	CHRGD		October 9	

== Deaths ==
Date	Name	Age	Notability	Source
January 17	Don Harron	90	Canadian actor, writer, and radio personality, best known for appearances as Charlie Farquharson on Hee Haw and other programs.	
April 15	Jonathan Crombie	48	Best known as Gilbert Blythe in the Anne of Green Gables television movies.	
April 23	Lois Lilienstein	78	Musical performer who starred on The Elephant Show and Skinnamarink TV as a member of children's trio Sharon, Lois & Bram.	
August 4	Chris Hyndman	49	Interior designer, talk show host (Designer Guys, Steven and Chris)	
November 20	Jim Perry	82	American-born game show host (Canadian shows included Definition, Headline Hunters, Miss Canada pageant)	

== See also ==
- 2015 in Canada
- List of Canadian films of 2015
