= Tim Blais =

Canadian science communicator

- Born: Hudson, Quebec, Canada

YouTube information
- Channel: acapellascience
- Years active: 2012–present
- Genres: Educational film; popular science; educational entertainment
- Subscribers: 373 thousand
- Views: 35.7 million
- Last updated: June 19, 2026

Tim Blais is a Canadian science communicator. He explains scientific topics via writing and performing a capella parodies of popular music which he records and posts on his YouTube channel, A Capella Science.

== Early life and education ==
Blais was born in Hudson, Quebec. Blais states that he comes from an "incredibly musical" family. His mother leads a church choir; Blais joined the choir when he was three. He also plays drums, piano, and stringed instruments including guitar. Blais graduated from McGill University in 2011 with a Bachelor of Science degree. In 2013, he earned a master's degree in high-energy theoretical physics with honors from McGill.

== Career ==
Blais created his first parody video in 2012, motivated by a desire to help people understand the world around them. He states that creating parody videos with a factual science theme came out of being fascinated by science, music (particularly a capella), and parody. He was inspired by "Weird Al" Yankovic, Bill Nye, Mike Tompkins, and Vi Hart. He was also inspired by the group The Maccabeats, an a cappella group that sings parodies of songs with replacement lyrics about Jewish themes. Blais has had an a cappella singing experience with Vancouver's Acapocalypse group.

In his solo videos, Blais performs all the tracks with his own voice, sometimes beat-boxing and creating brass sound effects. Most videos take a few hundred hours to complete.

Blais' first video parody was "Rolling in the Higgs", based on Adele's "Rolling in the Deep". The video was one of a handful of musical creations that followed the 2012 announcement of the discovery of a boson particle with Higgs-like characteristics. Blais' YouTube video generated over 17,000 hits in its first five days and has almost 1.2 million views as of April 2025. The video took Blais 60 hours to complete. Blais' second video, "Bohemian Gravity," parodied Queen's "Bohemian Rhapsody" to explain string theory. The video features a sock puppet portraying Albert Einstein. The work attracted the attention of Brian May, Queen's guitarist (who also holds a PhD degree in astrophysics), and May posted the video on his website.

Blais' YouTube channel has covered such topics as entropic time, exoplanets, and the discovery of insulin as a treatment for diabetes. Blais has collaborated with Dianna Cowern and others. Although Blais' career in science includes previous employment at the TRIUMF particle accelerator center in Vancouver, Canada, Blais makes a living from creating his videos, being supported by advertising revenue, sales of mp3s and posters, and contributions from fans via the Patreon website.

Blais also does public talks which include performances of his creations and as well as discussions of science culture and his experiences as a science graduate student and an artist in new media. In 2014, he was an artist-in-residence with the National Music Centre in Alberta, during which he experimented with new sounds and recorded tracks for an album. In 2015, he appeared on Canada's reality television program, Canada's Smartest Person, in which he won his episode but lost in the season finale.

== Discography ==
S.no	Song name	Parody of:	Key Idea(s)	Date of Upload to YouTube	Duration of Music Video	Notes
1.	"Rolling in the Higgs"	"Rolling in the Deep" – Adele	Higgs boson	August 21, 2012	3:53	First Video on the 'acapellascience' channel
2.	"Bye Bye Song"	N/A (Cover)	N/A	August 31, 2012	0:13	N/A
3.	"Bohemian Gravity"	"Bohemian Rhapsody" – Queen	String Theory	September 16, 2013	6:04	N/A
4.	"Massless"	"Madness" – Muse	Massless Particles	November 27, 2013	8:19	N/A
5.	"Eminemium (Choose Yourself)"	"Lose Yourself" – Eminem	Ethical and societal implications of scientific discovery	July 15, 2014	4:51	N/A
6.	"All About That Base (No Acid)"	"All About That Bass" – Meghan Trainor	Acid-Base Chemistry	November 7, 2014	3:40	First video on 'acapellascience2' channel
7.	"Take Exams"	"Shake it off" – Taylor Swift	Struggles of Exam preparation	December 12, 2014	4:46	Uploaded to 'acapellascience2'
8.	"The Surface Of Light"	"Circle of Life" – The Lion King (1994)	CMB Radiation	March 2, 2015	6:12	N/A
9.	"The Blankle of Space Life (YoungTay Remix)"	Experimental fusion of "Circle of Life" – The Lion King (1994) and "Blank Space" – Taylor Swift	N/A	March 25, 2015	3:58	Uploaded to 'acapellascience2'
10.	"Puffed Up Cores!"	"Pumped up Kicks" – Foster The People	Black Holes and Stars	June 9, 2015	4:02	N/A
11.	"PLUTO MARS: Outbound Probe "	"Uptown Funk" – Bruno Mars	Planetary Exploration	July 13, 2015	3:36	N/A
12.	"Hotline Tutoring"	"Hotline Bling" – Drake	'Nerdy' Love song	November 13, 2015	5:25	Uploaded to 'acapellascience2'
13.	"NERDS: A Manifesto"	N/A	Nerd Rap/ Anthem	December 1, 2015	3:08	N/A
14.	"Animalia Chorus!"	Chorus:"Hallelujah" – George Frideric Handel	Description of Kingdom Animalia	December 25, 2015	3:45	N/A
15.	"The Science of Love"	"Somebody to Love" – Queen	Biochemical Description of Falling in Love	February 9, 2016	5:10	N/A
16.	"LIGO Feel That Space"	"Can't Feel My Face" – The Weeknd	Laser Interferometer Gravitational-Wave Observatory (LIGO)	March 10, 2016	3:46	N/A
17.	"Defining Gravity (ft. Physics Girl & MALINDA)"	"Defying Gravity" – composed by Stephen Schwartz, Recorded by Idina Menzel and Kristin Chenoweth	Heated Debate between Isaac Newton and Albert Einstein	April 5, 2016	5:03	N/A
18.	"For Good (feat. Puppet Einstein & Puppet Newton)"	N/A	Wholesome Conversation between Newton and Einstein	April 5, 2016	5:59	Uploaded to 'acapellascience2'
19.	"Entropic Time"	"The Longest Time" – Billy Joel	Arrow of time (Second Law of Thermodynamics)	May 7, 2016	4:09	Tim used his ability to sing songs backward to record this song, and flipped it digitally, all to demonstrate the idea which forms the basis of this song.
20.	"William Rowan Hamilton"	"Alexander Hamilton" – from “Hamilton: An American Musical”	Life of William Rowan Hamilton	July 28, 2016	4:14	This is a Collaborative work of various Science YouTubers: Veritasium, Science with Tom, Coma Niddy, Hood Skalas, Tom Zalatnai, Hellen Arney, Simonoxfphys, Hank Green, and Baba Brinkman.
21.	"CRISPR-Cas9"	"Mr. Sandman" – Vaughn Monroe	CRISPR-Cas9 gene editing tool	October 8, 2016	4:48	N/A
22.	"Work From Home (Physics Version)"	"Work from Home" – Fifth Harmony ft. Ty Dolla $ign	Mechanical Advantages of Simple Machines	December 8, 2016	3:03	Features Nate Perl
23.	"Whole New Worlds: An Aladdin History of Exoplanets"	"Aladdin" (1992) Soundtrack	Exoplanets	March 2, 2017	8:06	Features Trudbol, SamRobson, and Gia Mora
24.	"More Than Birds"	"More Than Words" – Extreme	Evolutionary Relationship between Birds and Dinosaurs	May 3, 2017	4:48	N/A
25.	"The Molecular Shape of You"	"Shape of You" – Ed Sheeran	Quantum Mechanics, Chemical bonding, and Molecular Biology.	June 9, 2017	3:59	The Most Popular Music Video of the channel (9M views as of January 5, 2025)
26.	"Evo Devo"	"Despacito" – Luis Fonsi, Daddy Yankee	Evolutionary Developmental Biology	September 24, 2017	3:52	N/A
27.	"A Scientific Sea Shanty: Banting's Imparted Years"	"Barrett's Privateers" – Stan Rogers	Life, before and after Discovery of Insulin by Frederick Banting.	January 17, 2018	4:07	N/A
28.	"Nanobot"	"Havana" – Camila Cabello	Nanotechnology	August 25, 2018	3:20	ft. Dorothy Andrusiak
29.	"Started From A Bottom Quark"	"Started From the Bottom" – Drake	Large Hadron Collider (LHC)	February 19, 2019	3:03	N/A
30.	"Quarantine"	"Hide and Seek" – Imogen Heap	COVID-19 pandemic	May 23, 2020	4:26	N/A
31.	"Vaccine Wellerman"	"Wellerman" – Nathan Evans	COVID-19 Vaccine	January 18, 2021	1:00	N/A
32.	"the next phase"	"Aud Lang Syne" – Trad.	Human Immune system	January 5, 2023	1:31	Embedded within the music video is an announcement of a new series – "A Capella Science: Immunology"
33.	"Leukocyte"	"Dynamite" – BTS	Mechanisms of the WBC	January 28, 2023	3:34	First installment of "A Capella Science: Immunology"
34.	"Sargasso"	"Espresso" – Sabrina Carpenter	Life Cycle and Reproduction of the European Eel	November 1, 2024	4:37	N/A
35.	"Seven Science Carols"	1. "Silent Night" – Trad.; 2. "Winter Wonderland" – Bing Crosby; 3. "The First Noel" – Trad.; 4. "Jingle Bells" – Trad.; 5. "Angels we have Heard on High" – trad.; 6. "O Holy Night" – Trad.; 7. "Sleigh Ride" – Leroy Anderson	Seven Christmas Carols modified to parodies about Scientific topics like The Scientific Method, Evolution, The Nobel Prize, The VSEPR Theory, Black Holes, Molecular Biology, and Scientific Integrity.	December 25, 2024	7:16	Each of the songs was (Except the Parody of "Sleigh Ride") teased through Short Form videos on the channel throughout the Month of December.
