= Petrol (web series) =

Petrol is a Canadian crime drama web series, which premiered in 2016. The series focuses on five getaway drivers working for an organized crime syndicate led by a shadowy and mysterious crime boss (Neil Affleck) known only as The Employer.

The series cast includes Tyler Blake Smith, Kevin Corrigan, Jamie Elizabeth Sampson, Jimmy Yu, Kane Mahon, Jeremy Hull, Robert Gulassarian, Reza Sholeh, Kathryn Aboya, and Dennis Nimoh Jr. The series was produced and written by Sholeh and Ant Horasanli, and directed by Horasanli.

The series premiered in 2016 on YouTube. A second season, subtitled P2-GTA, launched in 2018.

The first season received a Canadian Screen Award nomination for Best Original Digital Program or Series, Fiction at the 5th Canadian Screen Awards in 2017, and Mahon was nominated for Best Actor in a Web Program or Series. At the 7th Canadian Screen Awards in 2019, Nimoh received a nomination for Best Supporting Performance in a Web Program or Series.
