= Paul Sun-Hyung Lee =

South Korean–Canadian actor (born 1972)

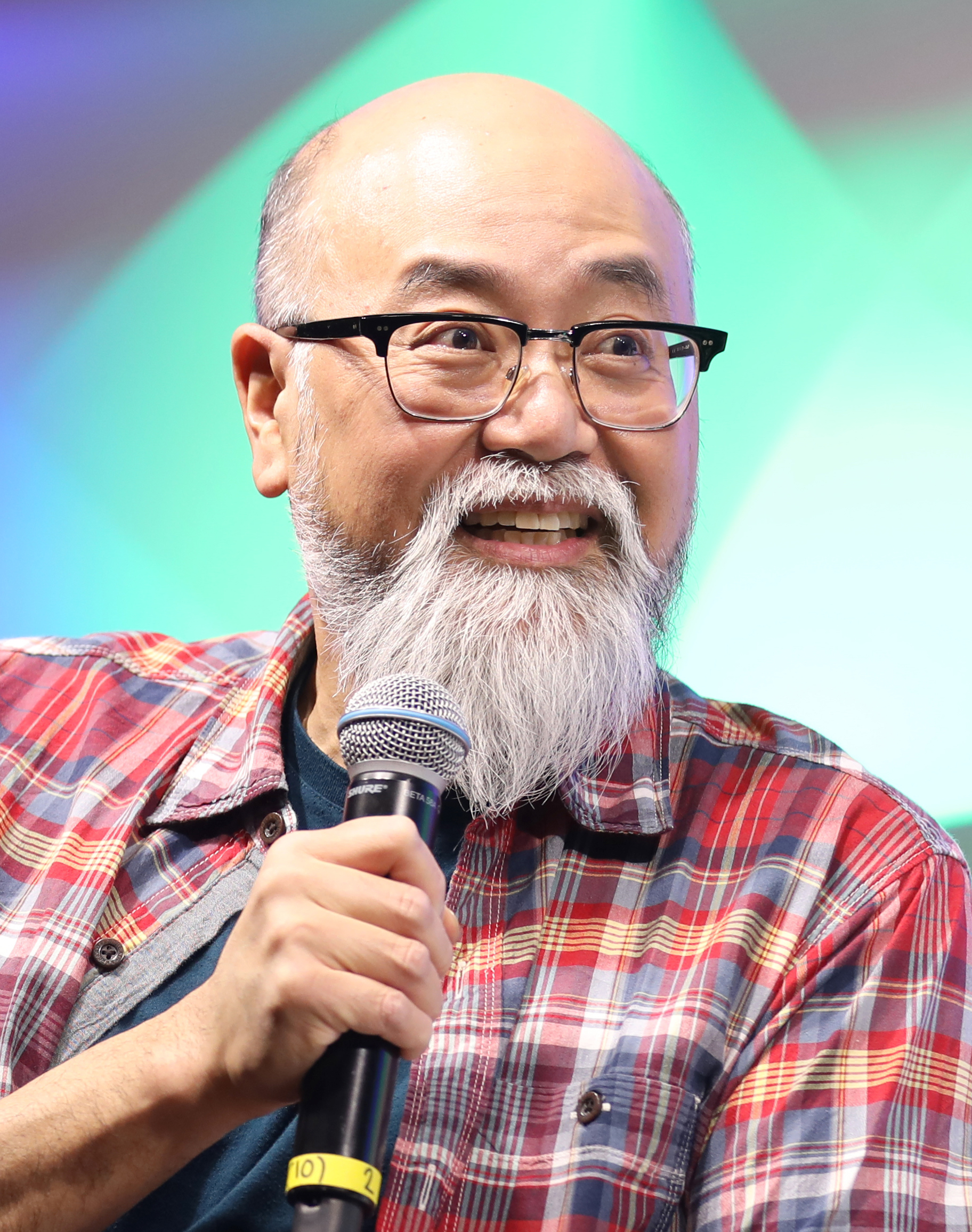
- Lee at the 2024 Phoenix Fan Fusion
- Born: August 16, 1972 (age 54); Daejeon, Chungnam, South Korea
- Education: University of Toronto
- Occupation: Actor
- Years active: 1989–present

Korean name
- Hangul: 이선형
- RR: I Seonhyeong
- MR: I Sŏnhyŏng

Paul Sun-Hyung Lee (Korean: 이선형; born August 16, 1972) is a South Korean–Canadian actor. He is best known for his roles as Randy Ko in the soap opera Train 48 (2003–2005) and as family patriarch Appa in the play Kim's Convenience (2011) and its television adaptation (2016–2021).

Lee has won the Canadian Screen Award for Best Actor in a Comedy Series four times for his role as Mr. Kim in Kim's Convenience. He has been nominated twice for the Dora Mavor Moore Award for Outstanding Performance by a Male in a Principal Role, Large Theatre, for The Monster Under the Bed in 2010 and the stage version of Kim's Convenience in 2012.

== Early life ==
When Lee was three months old, his parents emigrated from Daejeon, Chungnam, South Korea, to Canada. They lived successively in London and Toronto, both in the province of Ontario; and Calgary in Alberta.

In 1990, Lee moved back to Ontario to attend the University of Toronto. He studied in the drama program at University College.

== Career ==
Lee made his acting debut in 1989 in the television series Gideon Oliver. He had a supporting role in the film Ice Princess (2005) playing Tiffany's father. Lee appeared in the horror film P2 and the thriller The Echo. In 2006, he took the role of Jung Park in the video game Rainbow Six: Vegas and its 2008 sequel Rainbow Six: Vegas 2.

Lee was part of the main cast of the Global nightly improvised soap opera Train 48 in the role of Randy Ko for the entire run of the series from 2003 to 2005.

In 2012, Lee won the Best Actor citation from the Toronto Theatre Critics' Awards for his portrayal of Kim Sang-il in Kim's Convenience. He played the role of Appa on stage in several Toronto productions of Kim's Convenience and on a national tour with the Soulpepper theatre company, as well as at an Off Broadway staging of the play. He brought the role of Appa to television in 2016 when the show was adapted as a television series. In 2016, Lee played Zhang Lin in the Royal Manitoba Theatre Centre/Canadian Stage production of Chimerica. On January 11, 2017, he guest starred on an episode of This Hour Has 22 Minutes.

Lee has been nominated twice for the Dora Mavor Moore Award for Outstanding Performance by a Male in a Principal Role, Large Theatre, for The Monster Under the Bed in 2010 and Kim's Convenience in 2012. In the 5th, 6th, and 9th Canadian Screen Awards, he won the Best Actor in a Comedy Series for his portrayal of Appa in the Kim's Convenience television series. Lee was selected to host the fourth season of the reality competition show Canada's Smartest Person, entitled Canada's Smartest Person Junior and featuring children as contestants.

Lee is also a playwright. His play Dangling premiered N8at Toronto's fu-GEN theatre festival in 2010.

In 2020, he began portraying New Republic X-wing pilot Captain Carson Teva in The Mandalorian, appearing in two episodes of Season 2 ("Chapter 10: The Passenger" and "Chapter 12: The Siege") and twice more in Season 3 ("Chapter 21: The Pirate" and "Chapter 24: The Return"). Lee continued to reprise the role in various Star Wars franchise-related media such as The Book of Boba Fett ("Chapter 5: Return of the Mandalorian") in 2022, three episodes of Ahsoka Season 1 in 2023 ("Part Four: Fallen Jedi", "Part Five: Shadow Warrior", and "Part Seven: Dreams and Madness"), and in the 2026 feature film The Mandalorian and Grogu.

In 2021, Lee appeared as a panelist on Canada Reads, championing Natalie Zina Walschots's novel Hench. In the same year, Lee's five seasons on Kim's Convenience came to an abrupt end when the two show runners left the project.

In 2022, he was announced as the host of Fandemonium, a factual series which will profile the internal cultures of various pop culture fandoms. He also appeared on the 2022 revival of The Kids in the Hall.

In 2024, he played Uncle Iroh in the Netflix live action adaptation of Avatar: The Last Airbender. On March 6, 2024, Netflix announced that the series was renewed for two additional seasons after garnering 21.2 million views in its first four days. He also plays a new main character, Inspector Albert Choi, the new head of Station House No 4, in the eighteenth season of the CBC mystery series Murdoch Mysteries.

=== Honours ===
In 2023, Lee received the National Arts Centre Award at the Governor General's Performing Arts Awards.

== Filmography ==
=== Film ===
Year	Title	Role	Notes
1996	Harriet the Spy	Bruno Hung Fat	
2001	Khaled	Grocer	
2005	Ice Princess	Tiffany Lai's Dad	
2003	One Way	Hotel Receptionist	
2004	P2	Man in Elevator	
2014	RoboCop	Omnicorp Technician	Removed in the final cut
2015	End of Days, Inc.	Mort	
2020	Kitty Mammas	Dr. Han	
2024	The Second	Philip	Short
2024	Night of the Zoopocalypse	Felix	Voice
2026	The Mandalorian and Grogu	Captain Carson Teva	

=== Television ===
Year	Title	Role	Notes
1989	Gideon Oliver	Dan Wu	Episode: "Tongs"
1995	Where's the Money Noreen?	Gene Kajikawa	Television film
1999	Total Recall 2070	Waiter	Episode: "Rough Whimper of Insanity"
2002	Soul Food: The Series	Dan Lee	Episode: "A Taste of Justice"
2002	Doc	Orderly	Episode: "Complicated"
2002	Tagged: The Jonathan Wamback Story	Doctor	Television film
2003	Profoundly Normal	Delivery Doctor	Television film
2003–2005	Train 48	Randy Ko	Main role
2004	Kevin Hill	Phil Steckler	Episode: "The Good Life"
2005	This Is Wonderland	Mr. Phan	Episode #2.9
2005	1-800-Missing	Dr. Winston Nakano	Episode: "Fugitive"
2006	Billable Hours	Paul	Episode: "The Handicapped Bathroom"
2006	Between Truth and Lies	D.A. Lee	Television film
2007	The Jane Show	E.R. Doctor	Episode: "Plastic Ono Jane"
2007	Mayday	Captain Park Yong-chul	Episode: "Missed Approach" (Season 4, Episode 4)
2008	Little Mosque on the Prairie	Airport Security Guard Clask	Episode: "Islam on Tap"
2010	Covert Affairs	Theo Will	2 episodes
2010–2011	Degrassi: The Next Generation	Juan Tong	Recurring role, 6 episodes
2016–2021	Kim's Convenience	Sang-Il Kim (Appa)	Main role; 65 episodes Canadian Screen Award for Best Actor in a Comedy Series, 5th (2017) and 6th (2018); nominated 8th (2020)
2017	Dark Matter	Dr. Borsin	Episode: "It Doesn't Have to Be Like This"
2018	Canada's Smartest Person Junior	Himself	Host (season 4 of Smartest Person)
2019–2022	Abby Hatcher	Chef Jeff	Recurring voice role
2019	The Bravest Knight	The Potion Maker	Recurring voice role
2020–2023	The Mandalorian	Captain Carson Teva	4 episodes
2021	Private Eyes	Chef Andre	Episode: "The Perfect Storm"
2021	Bakugan: Geogan Rising	Spartillion	Recurring voice role
2021	Boyfriends of Christmas Past	Leo Kim	Television film
2022	The Book of Boba Fett	Captain Carson Teva	Episode: "Chapter 5: Return of the Mandalorian"
2022	The Kids in the Hall	Mr. Lewis	1 episode
2023	Family Law	Bert Choi	Episode: “Revisionist History”
2023	Ahsoka	Captain Carson Teva	3 episodes
2024–present	Avatar: The Last Airbender	Uncle Iroh	Main role
2024–2025	Go Togo	Sparks	Main voice role
2024–2026	Murdoch Mysteries	Inspector Albert Choi	Seasons 18-19
2025–present	Paw Patrol	Mr. Park	Recurring voice role
2026	Adults	Mr. Lee	Episode: "Vote for Paul Baker"

=== Video games ===
Year	Title	Role	Notes
2006	Rainbow Six: Vegas	Jung Park	
2008	Rainbow Six: Vegas 2	Jung Park	
