= Queer Hutterite =

- Directed by: Laura O'Grady
- Produced by: Laura O'Grady; Kelly Hofer
- Starring: Kelly Hofer
- Cinematography: Phil Harrison
- Edited by: Dean Evens
- Production company: Spotlight Productions
- Distributed by: Telus Optik Local
- Release date: 2016
- Running time: 15 minutes
- Country: Canada
- Language: English

Queer Hutterite: Misfit on the Colony is a Canadian documentary film, released in 2016.

Directed by Laura O'Grady, the film profiles Kelly Hofer, a gay activist and photographer in Calgary who grew up in a Hutterite religious community in southern Manitoba. The film focuses on Hofer's early life within the community, and what eventually forced him to leave and move to Calgary in 2012.

The film was released online through the Telus Optik Local platform in Alberta, before being released to YouTube later in the year. The film was also nominated for several awards through the Canadian Screen Awards in 2017 following its release.

== Plot ==
Queer Hutterite follows the life of Kelly Hofer as he grew up in the Hutterite colony of Green Acres, in southern Manitoba, Canada. The documentary focuses on the early life of Hofer as he grew up discovering his passion for photography in his early teens, while also coming to the discovery that he was gay. He knew that as a gay man, he would face discrimination within the Hutterite community and that he would no longer fit into the fabric of society within the colony. In June 2012, Hofer with the help of his sister who had left the colony years earlier, ran away from his family and the colony to move to Calgary where he could live more openly as himself. The film then moves to focus on Hofer's work as a photographer shedding light on the Hutterites in Canada and to provide support to other LGBTQ members of Hutterite communities.

His departure and eventual coming out caused a shift within the Hutterite community as it addressed internal homophobia and the possibility of more people within the colony of being gay. From Calgary, Hofer worked to help set up online forums for people within the Hutterite colonies where they can be more open and possibly even come out as gay themselves.

The film finishes by showing the unique photography work that Hofer has focused his life on. With his upbringing within the Hutterite community, he focuses his work to give a glimpse into the world of the Hutterites and break down the barriers and stereotypes that exist between common society and the society of the Hutterite colonies across Canada. The film finishes with a scene with Hofer and his sister reminiscing over old photos of their life within the Hutterite community and Hofer speaking about his hopes that he can one day visit his family again.

== Reviews ==
The documentary received positive feedback from Canadian news and media outlets. Most coverage of the movie focused on its nominations for awards following its release. In an April 2016 interview on CBC Radio's Q, O'Grady and Hofer talked about the role of the documentary in helping to raise awareness of LGBTQ issues within the Hutterite communities.

== Impact ==
The film, coupled with Hofer's work both within the LGBTQ community as well as with other former and current Hutterites has garnered some attention, both within and outside Hutterite communities across Canada. In an article released by the DailyXtra, another gay teen fled a Hutterite community in southern Manitoba, and moved to Winnipeg and came out after fleeing from the colony. In the article, Hofer is cited as an inspiration to the teen, who saw Hofer as an example of a fellow Hutterite, who fled their colony to live a more open life in a place where they can be accepted openly.

== Awards ==
The film received two Canadian Screen Award nominations at the 5th Canadian Screen Awards in 2017, for Best Original Program or Series produced for Digital Media – Non-Fiction and Best Direction in a Program or Series Produced for Digital Media. It won the 2017 Rosie Award for Best Director (Non-Fiction under 30 minutes).

== See also ==
- List of LGBT films directed by women
