= Hench (novel) =

2020 superhero novel by Natalie Zina Walschots

- Author: Natalie Zina Walschots
- Language: English
- Genre: Superhero fiction/Science fiction
- Publisher: William Morrow
- Publication date: September 22, 2020
- Publication place: United States
- Pages: 403
- ISBN: 9780062978578
- Followed by: Villain

Hench is a 2020 superhero fiction novel by Natalie Zina Walschots.

A sequel, Villain, was published in 2026.

== Synopsis ==
Anna Tromedlov works in the gig economy, providing clerical services to low-level supervillains in need of "henches"—until she becomes the collateral damage of one of the world's most powerful superheroes, SuperCollider. Anna is injured and disabled; during her long recovery, she begins to research the negative effects of superheroes and concludes that superheroes often cause massive collateral damage and do more harm than good to the world. She starts a blog to share her findings, which brings her to the attention of the world's greatest supervillain, Leviathan, who recruits her to assist him. Anna heads a team that uses data science to find superheroes's weaknesses and sabotage them, bringing her and Leviathan closer to their goal of revenge against SuperCollider.

== Reception ==
The New York Times considered that Hench "works well as a piece of office satire but loses its way in the last third", stating that the "long action sequences" make it "less a subversive take on power and more a straightforward comic book story;" the Times did, however, appreciate the "slow rollout" of the worldbuilding. Kirkus Reviews lauded Walschots' plot, prose, and "patient yet propulsive pacing", and observed that the novel's theme is moral relativism, as well as "the corrupting influence of power, and the necrotic nature of revenge."

National Public Radio called Anna "delightfully acerbic" and "sympathetic and horrible", and emphasized that although the novel "tackles serious issues like how women are treated in the workplace, or how friendships might splinter under the weight of fear", it is also "steeped in the glorious campiness of Golden and Silver Age superheroes".

Quill & Quire praised the novel as "stunning", "incisively smart", and a "hilarious and frequently bloody deconstruction of the superhero mythos", with the relationship between heroes Supercollider and Quantum Entanglement serving as a "vivid parsing" of "traditional gender roles".

In Locus, Paul Di Filippo commended the portrayal of Anna as "utterly human and relatable" and "never (...) predictable or boring", with the "understated quasi-romance between her and Leviathan [being] played just right"; Di Filippo also called Walschots an "expert at staging [superhero] battles", but expressed doubt as to the overall effectiveness of Anna's plan to ruin the lives of superheroes by subjecting them to an unending barrage of minor frustrations.

Cory Doctorow noted the novel's "sly, devastating critique of the state's monopoly on violence" and its "gender-, race- and class-based analysis of societal injustice", as well as its "verse-verse-chorus structure, building to a fantastic climax" and its "deliciously grotesque superhero battle".

Amal El-Mohtar underlined the extent to which the novel "dwell(s) in the reality of disability, the utter grinding mortality of enduring injury", as well as its "visceral tenderness and breathtaking insight", comparing it to Superfolks and to the work of Samit Basu.

Hench was featured on Canada Reads 2021, where it was championed by Paul Sun-Hyung Lee.
