= HumanTown =

Canadian sketch comedy troupe

HumanTown is a Canadian sketch comedy troupe, best known for winning the Canadian Broadcasting Corporation's ComedyCoup seed accelerator competition in 2014. Based in Vancouver, the troupe consists of Kajetan Kwiatkowski, Jack Heyes, Liam MacLeod, Kane Stewart, Miles Chalmers, and Daniel Doheny.

The troupe's comedy concept is framed by an orc named Orthak, who lives in a world populated entirely by Dungeons & Dragons character archetypes; within his reality, he is a fan of a role-playing game called HumanTown about imaginary creatures called humans. After he is magically teleported into the game's alternate reality, linked comedy sketches depict life in the human world. The troupe members are all high school friends, whose first collaboration as teenagers was a short comedy film called Monkey: Dawn of the Ape.

Their ComedyCoup prize consisted of $500,000 in production funding toward the creation of a 30-minute CBC Television comedy special. The special, directed by Vivieno Caldinelli, aired on the CBC in July 2016, and garnered two Canadian Screen Award nominations at the 5th Canadian Screen Awards for Best Photography in a Variety or Sketch Comedy Program or Series (D. Gregor Hagey) and Best Editing in a Variety or Sketch Comedy Program or Series (Aren Hansen).
