= Joel Richardson =

Canadian artist

Joel Aleister Richardson (born October 15, 1969) (a.k.a. Jimmy Swann), is a Canadian artist, filmmaker and award-winning athlete.

Richardson became widely known for his controversial clash with Toronto's mayor, Rob Ford. His work is extensive, ranging from oil on canvas, portraits and landscapes, to his unique style of flash mob performance street art, which closed streets in the heart of Toronto's financial district. He was an invited participant to the Occupy Wall Street main art show in New York City, which took place at the J. P. Morgan Building on Wall Street. He is a member of the Directors Guild of Canada (DGC) and has over 20 IMDb credits.

== Early life ==
Richardson's childhood was spent in Owen Sound, Ontario. He made a name for himself as an up-and-coming long distance runner, and in 1988 met future Olympic gold medalist Matthew Birir and his brother Jonah Birir at the World Junior Championships in Sudbury, Ontario. At the age of seventeen Richardson traveled to Kenya where he lived in a mud hut with the Birirs in a tiny village named Metipso, in the central highlands of Kenya.

== Artistic beginnings ==
In 1992, after returning to Canada from spending four months on the Gaza/Israeli border, Richardson was hospitalized for undisclosed reasons. After spending a month in the hospital, he rented a studio in the infamous 888 Dupont, a former factory with artists, musicians and hustlers. The atmosphere was one of creativity, subversion and a sense of community.

Two years later, Richardson returned to Metipso, where he would paint the people and landscapes that had so inspired him as a young athlete. These paintings would later be displayed at his first major exhibition at the Tom Thomson Memorial Gallery.

== Grenada ==
While at 888 Dupont, Richardson met with former members of Maurice Bishop's militia and made arrangements to travel to Grenada to paint. This eventually led him to live four months in Grenada with a fundamentalist Rastafarian family, where he painted over seventy-five paintings.

== Guatemala ==
In Guatemala, Richardson met stockbroker Johnny English (alias). Three days later, Richardson narrowly escaped an attack by bandits that left one man shot dead. These were life-changing experiences that dramatically affected his work. Finance became a major theme, and his relationship with English would inspire the yet-to-be-released documentary highlighting English's eventual flight from the markets, by motorcycle, into the Sahara Desert.

== Suitman ==
Over the years that followed, Richardson and stockbroker Johnny English would stay in contact, and through several trips to Europe, particularly to English's Options Trading Firm in Paris France, Richardson got a glimpse into the world of derivatives. Taking what he learned from English, Richardson created his own large equations based on the Black–Scholes model, and replacing certain numbers with a figure of a man in a suit.
