= Painted Land: In Search of the Group of Seven =

Canadian documentary film

Painted Land: In Search of the Group of Seven is a Canadian 2015 documentary film written by Nancy Lang and directed by Phyllis Ellis. It tells the daring story of three adventurers who travel through the Canadian terrain to arrive at different landscapes that have famously been painted before, and allows them to appreciate the spirituality and artistry behind the paintings, and their natural locations. The title refers to the Group of Seven, a group of Canadian landscape artists who were active 1920–1933.

The film was an official selection at the 2015 Vancouver International Film Festival.
