= True North Calling =

2017 Canadian documentary television series

- Genre: Documentary
- Country of origin: Canada
- Original language: English
- No. of episodes: 6

Production
- Production company: Proper Television

Original release
- Network: CBC Television
- Release: February 17 – March 24, 2017

True North Calling is a Canadian documentary television series that debuted on CBC Television on February 7, 2017. Produced by Proper Television, the six-part series profiles several young Canadians living in the Canadian Arctic territories of Northwest Territories, Yukon and Nunavut.

== Production ==
True North Calling was produced by Proper Television with executive producer Allison Grace. According to Grace, they sought to show "a cross-section of Northerners, each doing different things directly connected to the land and culture". They wanted to cover each of the three territories – Northwest Territories, Yukon and Nunavut – to show the differing landscapes and cultures.

The series was filmed over ten months in the Canadian territories. The shoot was expensive due to the remote locations, availability of local film crews, and effects of the climate on equipment and schedules. On some days of the shoot, there were fewer than three hours of daylight.

== Subjects ==
The series focuses on six people and their livelihoods in Canada's far north:

- Franco Buscemi, the general manager of a fuel depot in Iqaluit, Nunavut, who hunts, performs stand-up comedy, and plans to run for public office
- Kylik Kisoun Taylor, a tour operator in Inuvik, Northwest Territories, who mixes cultural traditions with shrewd marketing
- Shawn Buckley, a third-generation fisherman and single parent in Yellowknife, Northwest Territories
- Kate Mechan and Bart Bounds, sustainable farmers outside of Whitehorse, Yukon, starting their family off the grid
- Stacey Aglok Macdonald, a television producer in Iqaluit, who seeks to make a comedy series in the Inuktitut language.

== Episodes ==
No.	Title	Original release date
1	"Taking Risks"	February 17, 2017
A team of staff in Iqaluit makes certain that a fuel transfer from tanker to fuel farm is completed without incident. Fuel manager Franco Buscemi wants to run in the next territorial government election. Raised in Ontario, Kylik Kisoun Taylor returns to Inuvik to run a tourism company. He consults an elder for guidance on a tourist promotion for the annual migration of the reindeer to the calving grounds.
2	"Living Off the Land"	February 24, 2017
Third-generation Yellowknife fisher Shawn Buckley passes on the tradition of fishing on ice in Great Slave Lake to his son while confronting the memories of losing his brother who fell through the ice. Organic farmers Kate Mechan and Bart Bounds, living off the grid in Takhini Valley, just north of Whitehorse, ponder their future plans in preparation for the birth of their second child.
3	"Next Steps"	March 3, 2017
Taylor makes a successful practice run on the reindeer migration before pitching his tour at a meeting of wholesale travel agencies in China. Buscemi makes another step towards launching his political career while highlighting challenges in the community such as poverty, high cost of living and high suicide rates.
4	"Growing Pains"	March 10, 2017
Spring arrives in the north. Mechan and Bounds face an interior-space issue with the birth of their second child. The cost of buying a second yurt for additional space means they have to increase their sales. Buckley had to retrieve his nets early from an early spring storm. To supplement his income, he decides to enter the tourism industry and demonstrate commercial fishing to tourists.
5	"New Beginnings"	March 17, 2017
Stacey Aglok MacDonald, faced challenges producing Qanurli, an Iqaluit-based television show spoken entirely in Inuktitut, including lack of local talent, a small population to audition for roles, insufficient studio space and camera gear lost during transport. Buckley can't find the crane to lift his boat out of Great Slave Lake. A contact of his finds a spot for his boat to overwinter at the dock in Back Bay.
6	"The Future"	March 24, 2017
Mechan and Bounds save enough money to buy the second yurt. While filming for season 6 of Qanurli, MacDonald has to deal with environmental problems (extreme cold and short daylight hours in winter) and socioeconomic challenges (unreliable internet). The reindeer migration tour from north of Inuvik to calving grounds in Richards Island is a success and Taylor stakes out the land for his future home.

== Release ==
True North Calling was announced as part of CBC Television's "most ambitious, diverse programming" schedule for the 150th anniversary of Canada in 2017.

== Reception ==
Greg David of TV, eh? found that the series succeeded in showing the difficulties of living in the arctic and the people who take on the challenge, with "glorious views" of the arctic landscape. Writing for The Toronto Star, David Korb felt the series provided "fascinating insight" into how people live in Canada's north. Chris Lackner of the Winnipeg Free Press wrote that the series provided "a candid look at inspiring lives".

McGill University Professor Marianne Stenbaek, an expert in Nunavik literature and the northern regions, felt that the series showed "northerners' ingenuity and diversity" in the modern north. She felt that the series was overdue, and provided an optimistic view to balance news coverage which focused on social problems such as alcoholism, suicide, and housing shortages.
