= Hello Goodbye (TV series) =

2005 Dutch airport reality television show

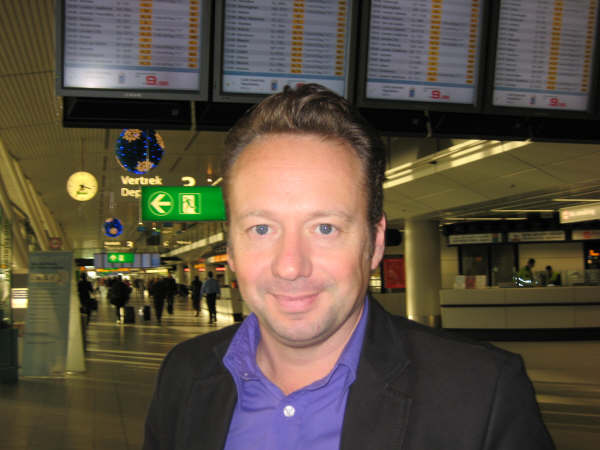
- Portrait of Joris Linssen Schiphol of hello goodbye series
- Starring: Joris Linssen
- Country of origin: Netherlands

Production
- Running time: 30-50 mins (no ads)

Original release
- Network: Nederland 1 (now NPO 1)
- Release: 2005 – present

Hello Goodbye is a Dutch airport reality television show produced by the Dutch broadcaster NCRV for Nederland 1 and hosted by Joris Linssen. The format has been picked up and remade in other countries.

== Format ==
The show involves the presenter, roaming around the airport (Amsterdam Airport Schiphol in the Dutch series, London Heathrow Airport in the British series and Toronto Pearson International Airport in the Canadian series) with a cameraman asking members of the public in departures and arrivals who they are saying goodbye to at the airport, or welcoming home. The presenter looks for unusual stories and the show is edited with inspirational music in dramatic points of the show, usually when people say their goodbyes or meet who they have been waiting for.

== International versions ==
A British version of the show was commissioned for six episodes broadcast over six weeks.

Country	Version's name	Host	Channel	First episode date	Running time	Last episode date
Belgium	Hello Goodbye	Dieter Coppens	VTM	24 February 2009		
Brazil	Chegadas e Partidas	Astrid Fontenelle	GNT	23 March 2011	30 mins (incl. ads)	
Canada	Hello Goodbye	Dale Curd	CBC Television	8 January 2016	30 mins (incl. ads)	
Colombia	Más lejos más cerca	Beto Villa	RCN Televisión	1 October 2018	30 mins (incl. ads)	
United Kingdom	Hello Goodbye	Kate Thornton	Sky 1	19 February 2009	60 mins (incl. ads)	
United States	Hello Goodbye	Curt Menefee	Travel Channel	9 May 2016	30 mins (incl. ads)	2016
ITA Italy	Hello Goodbye	Marco Berry, Pablo Trincia	Rete 4, Real Time	17 October 2016	30 mins (inc. ads), 60 min (incl. ads)	
