= Canada's Smartest Person =

- Also known as: Canada's Smartest Person Junior (season 4)
- Genre: Competition
- Created by: Robert Cohen
- Presented by: Gerry Dee; Jessi Cruickshank; Jeff Douglas; Paul Sun-Hyung Lee
- Country of origin: Canada
- Original language: English
- No. of seasons: 4 (+1 special)
- No. of episodes: 30

Production
- Executive producer: Robert Cohen
- Production company: Media Headquarters

Original release
- Network: CBC Television
- Release: September 28, 2014 – December 19, 2019

Canada's Smartest Person is a Canadian reality television competition series. Contestants compete in a series of different challenges based on American psychologist Howard Gardner's theory of multiple intelligences to earn the title of "Canada's Smartest Person." The first three seasons of the series were hosted by television personality Jessi Cruickshank, and the fourth by actor Paul Sun-Hyung Lee. Actor Jeff Douglas co-hosted the first season in 2014 with Cruickshank.

The show was produced by Media Headquarters and broadcast nationally on CBC Television. The first version of the show aired in 2012 as a 2-hour special. The series was picked up and the first full season aired on CBC as a 9-part series in 2014. It was the number one new Canadian series of the fall season, with almost one in four Canadians tuning in. In 2016, it was the only original Canadian format to be nominated for the Academy of Canadian Cinema & Television's Golden Screen Award for highest rated reality series. The second season began airing on October 4, 2015. On March 31, 2016, CBC announced the series would return for a third season as part of their fall/winter schedule. The fourth season, a spin off known as Canada's Smartest Person Junior, began airing on November 14, 2018. Canada's Smartest Person had one of the highest percentages of family and co-viewing ever on CBC.

During the broadcast, viewers participate in all of the challenges from home in real-time using a smartphone app. The play-along app has been an industry-leading success. The first season of the series saw over 175,000 downloads of the app and nearly one million individual intelligence tests taken across the country. As of 2017 there have been over 300,000 downloads of the app, making it one of the most successful peer to peer gaming applications in Canada.

== Format ==
Every week four Canadians compete in front of a studio audience. They are given a set of five challenges designed to test their abilities in one or more of the following intelligence categories: musical, physical, social, logical, visual and linguistic. There was always one challenge that combined two categories together.

In the series finale, eight finalists compete to earn the title of Canada's Smartest Person.

The 2014 series opened with a one-hour documentary that explored the Theory of Multiple Intelligence.

The format is being exploited internationally by multi-media studio Electus. Electus has licensed Canada's Smartest Person to Turkey's TRT and Sera Film for production, and has secured deals in France, Norway, Sweden and Portugal

== Season overview ==
Season	Episodes	Premiere date	Finale date	Host(s)	Winner
Special	1	March 18, 2012		Gerry Dee	Peter Dyakowski
1	9	September 28, 2014	November 23, 2014	Jessi Cruickshank; Jeff Douglas	Braden Lauer
2	8	October 4, 2015	November 22, 2015	Jessi Cruickshank	Katy Warren
3	6	November 13, 2016	December 18, 2016	Jessi Cruickshank	Stephanie Harvey
4	6	November 14, 2018	December 19, 2018	Paul Sun-Hyung Lee	Mateus Soto

== Participants ==
=== Season 1 ===
==== Episode 101 - September 28, 2014 ====
Participant	Origin	Results
Kiel Lemmen	Port Coquitlam, BC	
Roselyn Kelada-Sedra	Toronto, ON	
Albert Tam	Woodbridge, ON	WINNER
Tova Sherman	Bedford, NS	

==== Episode 102 - October 5, 2014 ====
Participant	Origin	Results
JP Doiron	North Rustico, PEI	
Alisia Bonnick	Stouffville, ON	
Rhiannon Jones	Chilliwack, BC	
Chris Tessaro	Mississauga, ON	WINNER

==== Episode 103 - October 12, 2014 ====
Participant	Origin	Results
Mith Das	Toronto, ON	WINNER
Norm Odjick	Kitigan Zibi, QC	
Melanie Martin	Winnipeg, MB	
Lisa Preston	Mississauga, ON	

==== Episode 104 - October 19, 2014 ====
Participant	Origin	Results
Yahaya Baruwa	Toronto, ON	
George Millar	Edmonton, AB	
Mary Rose	Victoria, BC	
Victoria Leenders-Cheng	Montreal, QC	WINNER

==== Episode 105 - October 26, 2014 ====
Participant	Origin	Results
Max Cameron	Calgary, AB	WINNER
Cat Jahnke	Winnipeg, MB	
Kaveh Kavoosi	Aurora, ON	
Jennifer Hurd	Ottawa, ON	

==== Episode 106 - November 2, 2014 ====
Participant	Origin	Results
Brian Charbonneau	Sainte-Genevieve, QC	
Daryl Dillman	Cole Harbour, NS	WINNER
Kate LaFrance	Fredericton, NB	
Nick Nickerson	Merrickville, ON	

==== Episode 107 - November 9, 2014 ====
Participant	Origin	Results
Johnny MacRae	Vancouver, BC	WINNER
Ellen Snider	Quispamsis, NB	
Chris Sensenig	Welland, ON	
Nader Nadernejad	Peterborough, ON	

==== Episode 108 - November 16, 2014 ====
Participant	Origin	Results
Braden Lauer	Vancouver BC	WINNER
Alea Ciecko	Winnipeg, MB	
Dipna Horra	Ottawa, ON	
Brent Hayden	Vancouver, BC	

==== Episode 109 - November 23, 2014 ====
In the season finale, the winners from each episode competed in a series of competitions for the title of "Canada's Smartest Person".

Placement	Contestant	Qualifier			Tests							Super Gauntlet
Placement	Contestant	Round 1	Round 2		Crosswalk (Visual)	Karaoke Nightmare (Musical)	Word Master (Linguistic)	Pathfinder (Logical)	Take a Side (Social)	Sport Stacking (Physical)	Total	Super Gauntlet
1	Braden Lauer	66%	—N/a		1	4	3	2	3	4	17 (Note: Braden and Chris tied for second place with 17 points after the six tests. As they had two first place finishes each, the tie was broken by their number of second place finishes; as Johnny had more, she advanced to the Gauntlet.)	Canada's Smartest Person
2	Johnny MacRae	IN		3	3	3	4	3	4	1	18	Runner-Up
3	Chris Tessaro	IN	3		4	2	2	4	2	3	17	
4	Max Cameron	76%	—N/a		2	1	1	1	1	2	8	
5	Mith Das	IN	2									
6	Daryl Dillman	IN		1								
7	Albert Tam	58%										
8	Victoria Leenders-Chong	48%										

=== Season 2 ===
==== Episode 201 - October 4th, 2015 ====
Placement	Contestant	Tests						Gauntlet
Placement	Contestant	Beat It (Musical)	Crosswalk (Visual)	Human Lie Detector (Social)	Letter Chaos (Linguistic)	Balls of Fury (Physical/Logical)	Total	Gauntlet
1	Anthony Craparotta 32, Toronto, Ontario	3	3	1	3	10	20	WIN
2	Maya Burhanpurkar 16, Barrie, Ontario	5	5	3	2	4	19	LOSE
3	Jessica Joy	1	2	2	5	6	16	
4	Richard Pinnock	2	1	5	1	2	11	

==== Episode 202 - October 11th, 2015 ====
Placement	Contestant	Tests						Gauntlet
Placement	Contestant	Double Take (Visual)	Blow Back (Physical)	Mix Master (Musical)	Pipe Fitter (Logical)	Spin-a-Speech (Social/Linguistic)	Total	Gauntlet
1	Tim Blais 25, Montreal, Quebec	5	5	5	2	4	21	WIN
2	Maryanne Lewell 40, Saint John, New Brunswick	1	3	2	5	6	17 (Note: Ira and Maryanne tied for second place with 17 points after the five tests. As they had one first place finish each, the tie was broken by their number of second place finishes; as Maryanne had more, she advanced to the Gauntlet.)	LOSE
3	Ira Timothy	2	1	1	3	10	17	
4	Marielle Leigh 23, Toronto, Ontario	3	2	3	1	2	11	

==== Episode 203 - October 18th, 2015 ====
Placement	Contestant	Tests						Gauntlet
Placement	Contestant	Cranium Crash (Logical)	Twitterverse (Linguistic)	Model Mayhem (Visual)	Faces (Social)	Twisty Tune (Musical/Physical)	Total	Gauntlet
1	Dan Tweyman 36, Belleville, Ontario	5	3	3	5	4	20	WIN
2	Heather Whittaker Winnipeg, Manitoba	3	2	5	1	10	21	LOSE
3	Chris Harris Saskatoon, Saskatchewan	1	5	2	2	6	16	
4	Denise Yuen Vancouver, British Columbia	2	1	1	3	2	9	

==== Episode 204 - October 25th, 2015 ====
Placement	Contestant	Tests						Gauntlet
Placement	Contestant	Definition Dilemma (Linguistic)	Human Lie Detector (Social)	Pipe Fitter (Logical)	Stack of Shapes (Visual)	Step Squad (Musical/Physical)	Total	Gauntlet
1	Katy Warren 21, St. John's, Newfoundland and Labrador	3	3	3	5	6	20	WIN
2	Petros Kusmu	2	5	2	1	10	20	LOSE
3	Andrew Hall Vancouver, British Columbia	5	2	5	3	4	19	
4	Neila Scott	1	1	1	2	2	7	

==== Episode 205 - November 1st, 2015 ====
Placement	Contestant	Tests						Gauntlet
Placement	Contestant	Music Match (Musical)	Canvas Calamity (Visual)	Cranium Crash (Logical)	Teeter Tower (Physical)	Spin-a-Speech (Social/Linguistic)	Total	Gauntlet
1	Alex Manea 31, Waterloo, Ontario	2	1	5	5	10	23	WIN
2	Jakob Sanderson	5	3	3	3	6	20	LOSE
3	Barry Shulman	3	2	1	2	4	12	
4	Jennifer Lam	1	5	2	1	2	11	

==== Episode 206 - November 8th, 2015 ====
Placement	Contestant	Tests						Gauntlet
Placement	Contestant	Double Take (Visual)	Twitterverse (Linguistic)	Faces (Social)	Mix Master (Musical)	Balls of Fury (Physical/Logical)	Total	Gauntlet
1	Marco Iannuzzi 28, White Rock, British Columbia	3	1	5	1	10	20	WIN
2	Amanda Khan 28, Toronto, Ontario	5	5	2	3	4	19 (Note: Amanda and Margaret tied for second place with 19 points after the five tests; as Amanda had more first place finishes, she advanced to the Gauntlet.)	LOSE
3	Margaret Fay 31, Halifax, Nova Scotia	2	3	3	5	6	19	
4	Permadi Witjaksono 44, Winnipeg, Manitoba	1	2	1	2	2	8	

==== Episode 207 - November 15th, 2015 ====
Placement	Contestant	Tests						Gauntlet
Placement	Contestant	Letter Chaos (Linguistic)	Blow Back (Physical)	Stack of Shapes (Visual)	Portfolio Pro (Logical)	Karaoke Nightmare (Musical/Social)	Total	Gauntlet
1	Jason Vander-Hoek	1	5	5	3	10	24	WIN
2	Alex Pascuzzi Vancouver, British Columbia	3	3	3	2	6	17	LOSE
3	Anish Ahuja Montreal, Quebec	5	2	2	5	2	16	
4	Julie Francis	2	1	1	1	4	9	

==== Episode 208 - November 22nd, 2015 ====
In the season finale, the winners from each episode competed in a series of competitions for the title of "Canada's Smartest Person". The seven Gauntlet winners from the previous episodes were joined by a wildcard, determined by the Gauntlet loser who had accumulated the most points in their episode.

Placement	Contestant	Qualifier			Tests							Super Gauntlet
Placement	Contestant	Round 1	Round 2		Syllable Switch (Linguistic)	Orders Up (Visual)	Sliding Scale (Musical)	Moving Sum (Logical)	Screen Test (Social)	Ball Handler (Physical)	Total	Super Gauntlet
1	Katy Warren 21, St. John's, Newfoundland and Labrador	83%	—N/a		4	4	2	2	3	1	16 (Note: Katy and Tim tied for second place with 16 points after the six tests. As they had identical placements, the tie was broken by their scores from the first round in the qualifier; as Katy's was higher, she advanced to the Super Gauntlet.)	Canada's Smartest Person
2	Jason Vander-Hoek	IN	3		3	3	3	4	4	2	19	Runner-Up
3	Tim Blais 25, Montreal, Quebec	80%	—N/a		1	2	4	3	2	4	16	
4	Anthony Craparotta 32, Toronto, Ontario	IN		3	2	1	1	1	1	3	9	
5	Dan Tweyman 36, Belleville, Ontario	IN		0								
5	Heather Whittaker (Note: Though Heather did not initially qualify for the finals, she earned the wildcard spot due to having the most points of all the players who lost the Gauntlet.)	IN	0									
7	Alex Manea 31, Waterloo, Ontario	64%										
8	Marco Iannuzzi 28, White Rock, British Columbia	54%										

=== Season 3 ===
==== Episode 301 - November 13, 2016 ====
Placement	Contestant	Speed Round	Mix Master (Musical)	Spin-a-Speech (Linguistic)	Total	Gear Head (Visual/Logical)	Total	Gauntlet
1	Stephanie Harvey 30, Quebec City, Quebec	1	5	2	8	10	18	WIN
2	Jonathan Gagnon 31, Vancouver, British Columbia	3	3	5	11	6	17	LOSE
3	Susan Forgues 54, Orleans, Ontario	5	1	3	9	2	11	
4	Steve Norn 40, Yellowknife, Northwest Territories	2	2	1	5			
5	Rup Magon 41, Montreal, Quebec	OUT						
5	Vincent Law 33, Calgary, Alberta	OUT						

==== Episode 302 - November 20, 2016 ====
Placement	Contestant	Speed Round	Human Lie Detector (Social)	Beat It (Musical)	Total	Wobble Words (Linguistic/Physical)	Total	Gauntlet
1	Josh Williams 25, Edmonton, Alberta	3	5	5	13	10	23	WIN
2	Donna Hartt 46, Cranbrook, British Columbia	2	3	3	8	6	14	LOSE
3	Jennifer Martin 33, Portugal Cove-St. Philips, Newfoundland and Labrador	5	1	1	7	2	9	
4	Chris Williams 54, Round Hill, Nova Scotia	1	2	2	5			
5	CJ Studer 39, Miscouche, Prince Edward Island	OUT						
6	Christine Cho 36, Toronto, Ontario	OUT						

==== Episode 303 - November 27, 2016 ====
Placement	Contestant	Speed Round	Broken Register (Logical)	Colour Blender (Visual)	Total	Screen Test (Linguistic/Social)	Total	Gauntlet
1	Maria Samson 33, Calgary, Alberta	5	3	5	13	2	15	WIN
2	Frankie Cena Vancouver, British Columbia	2	5	2	9	10	19	LOSE
3	Vanessa Vakharia 35, Toronto, Ontario	1	2	3	6	6	12	
4	Ryan Coelho 31, Toronto, Ontario	3	1	1	5			
5	Rebecca Bromwich 39, Calgary, Alberta	OUT						
5	Gwyneth Foster 17, Uxbridge, Ontario	OUT						

==== Episode 304 - December 4, 2016 ====
Placement	Contestant	Speed Round	CSP News (Linguistic)	Mix Master (Musical)	Total	Gear Head (Visual/Logical)	Total	Gauntlet
1	Brittain Bancroft 30, Minto, New Brunswick	2	5	3	10	10	20	WIN
2	Devon Jones 37, Winnipeg, Manitoba	5	2	2	9	6	15	LOSE
3	Michelle Zakrison 34, Iqaluit, Nunavut	1	3	5	9	2	11	
4	Bruce Tsuji 62, Ottawa, Ontario	3	1	1	5			
5	Darryl Gidyk 43, Lethbridge, Alberta	OUT						
6	Siera Bearchell 23, Moose Jaw, Saskatchewan	OUT						

==== Episode 305 - December 11, 2016 ====
Placement	Contestant	Speed Round	Canvas Calamity (Visual)	Extreme Layover (Logical)	Total	Wobble Words (Physical/Linguistic)	Total	Gauntlet
1	Eric Yue 40, Victoria, British Columbia	5	1	5	11	6	17	WIN
2	Dustin Herbison 29, Kelowna, British Columbia	3	2	3	8	10	18	OUT
3	Melissa Deciantis 25, Mississauga, Ontario	2	3	2	7 (Note: Melissa and Michelle tied for third place after three challenges. As Melissa scored higher in the speed round, she continued in the competition.)	2	9	
4	Michelle Salt Calmar, Alberta	1	5	1	7			
5	Wali Shah 21, Mississauga, Ontario	OUT						
6	Tristan Campus Mississauga, Ontario	OUT						

==== Episode 306 - December 18, 2016 ====
Placement	Contestant	Crosswalk (Visual)	Syllable Switch (Linguistic)	Cranium Crash (Logical)	Total	Human Lie Detector (Social)	Total	Twisty Tune (Musical/Physical)	Total	Super Gauntlet
1	Stephanie Harvey 30, Quebec City, Quebec	5	4	2	11	1	12	6	18	Canada's Smartest Person
2	Eric Yue 40, Victoria, British Columbia	3	5	4	12	5	17	10	27	Runner-up
3	Maria Samson 33, Calgary, Alberta	4	2	5	11	3	14	2	16	
4	Brittain Bancroft 30, Minto, New Brunswick	1	3	3	7	2	9			
5	Josh Williams 25, Edmonton, Alberta	2	1	1	5					

=== Season 4 ===
The fourth season of Canada's Smartest Person (officially entitled Canada's Smartest Person Junior) premiered on November 14, 2018. As the official title implies, the contestants are all preadolescent. Paul Sun-Hyung Lee hosted this season.

Unlike the previous three seasons which followed a knockout format, this season followed a traditional competitive reality television series format.

Each of the first three episodes began with a Speed Round, which consists of six small challenges in a rapid-fire succession. After the challenge, the lowest-scoring contestant was eliminated from the competition automatically and the highest-scoring contestant was deemed safe from elimination. Then, the remaining contestants were paired based on their rankings in the Speed Round (2nd place with 3rd place, 4th place with 5th place, etc.) and competed in a team challenge. After the challenge, all but the bottom two pairings were deemed safe from elimination. Afterwards, the remaining four contestants competed in a head-to-head challenge and the top two performers were deemed safe after the challenge. Finally, the remaining two contestants competed in the Ultimate Elimination round, which consists of various sudden-death challenges that two contestants compete head-to-head in. Once a contestant won three rounds, that contestant was deemed safe and the other was eliminated from the competition.

The fourth episode also began with a Speed Round, but unlike the first three episodes, the highest-scoring contestant was not deemed safe from elimination after the challenge. Then, the remaining contestants competed in a head-to-head challenge instead of a team challenge. After the challenge, only the highest-scoring contestant was deemed safe from elimination. The latter two challenges of the episode proceeded the same way that the latter two challenges of the first three did.

The fifth episode was a Redemption episode in which the first eight eliminated contestants were given a chance to return to the competition and qualify for the finale as a result. Like usual, the episode began with a Speed Round, but, after the challenge, the two lowest-scoring contestants were eliminated from the Redemption episode automatically and the highest-scoring contestant still had to compete in further challenges with the rest. Then, the remaining six contestants competed in a head-to-head challenge that, afterwards, would eliminate the two lowest-scoring contestants from the Redemption episode. Then, the remaining four contestants competed in a head-to-head challenge that, afterwards, would eliminate the lowest-scoring contestant from the Redemption episode and would return the highest-scoring contestant back into the competition. Finally, the remaining two contestants competed in the Ultimate Elimination round. The winner of the face-off returned to the competition and the other was eliminated from the Redemption episode.

The sixth and final episode consisted of five head-to-head challenges in which, after each one, the lowest-scoring contestant would be eliminated from the competition. The last of these challenges was the Super Gauntlet, a Canada's Smartest Person classic, which resulted in Mateus Soto being declared the winner of Canada's Smartest Person Junior.

Contestant	Age (Note: Age at the time of filming)	Hometown	Status
Mateus Soto	11	Toronto, Ontario	Won on December 19th
Alexia Sabau	12	Calgary, Alberta	Became Runner-up on December 19th Returned on December 12th Eliminated on November 28th
Matthew Yu	10	West Vancouver, British Columbia	Eliminated on December 19th
Liam Veale	12	Saint John, New Brunswick	Eliminated on December 19th
Liam Henderson	11	Sarnia, Ontario	Eliminated on December 19th Returned on December 12th Eliminated on November 14th
Danica Scully	11	Halifax, Nova Scotia	Eliminated on December 19th
Sandra Nitchi	11	Montreal, Quebec	Eliminated on December 5th
Zoe Devalia	11	Scarborough, Toronto, Ontario	Eliminated on December 5th
Ashley Taylor	11	Guelph, Ontario	Eliminated on November 28th
Arjun Ram	12	Hamilton, Ontario	Eliminated on November 21st
Misuzu Tamaki	11	Markham, Ontario	Eliminated on November 21st
Matthew Shimon	12	Sydney, Nova Scotia	Eliminated on November 14th

Place	Contestant	Episode																								
Place	Contestant	401				402				403				404				405 - Redemption				406				
Place	Contestant	Speed Round (Note: In order, the Speed Round challenges were Highest Value (logical), Spell Check (linguistic), Balanced Meal (physical), Music Match (musical), Spin Cycle (visual), and Mixed Emotions (social).)	Cake Mix	Tower of Intelligence	Ultimate Elimination (Note: In order, the Ultimate Elimination challenges were Stack of Shapes (visual; won by Liam H.), Pocket Change (logical; won by Liam H.), Beat It (musical; won by Zoe), Scrambled (linguistic; won by Zoe), and Bounce Back (physical; won by Zoe).)	Speed Round (Note: In order, the Speed Round challenges were Lone Shape (visual), Power Shopper (logical), See Saw Stack (physical), Listen Up (musical), Faces (social), and The Write Whey (linguistic).)	Factory Fiasco	Letter Chaos (Note: The challenge finished once two contestants received at least 10 points.)	Ultimate Elimination (Note: In order, the Ultimate Elimination challenges were Snap Shelf (visual; won by Matthew Y.), See and Say (linguistic; won by Arjun), Tip the Scales (logical; won by Matthew Y.), and Music Match (musical; won by Matthew Y.).)	Speed Round (Note: In order, the Speed Round challenges were Highest Value (logical), Mirror Image (visual), Wingnuts (physical), Mixed Emotions (social), Note the Number (musical), and Word Worm (linguistic).)	Laser Labyrinth (Note: 'Labyrinth' was misspelled as 'Labryinth' on the screen.) (Note: Contestants were given a ten-second penalty for each time they broke a beam when navigating the laser labyrinth.)	Double Take (Note: The challenge finished once two contestants received 5 points.)	Ultimate Elimination (Note: In order, the Ultimate Elimination challenges were Twisted Tower (physical; won by Ashley), Card Craze (visual; won by Danica), Moving Sum (logical; won by Danica), Beat It (musical; won by Ashley), and See and Say (linguistic; won by Danica).)	Speed Round (Note: In order, the Speed Round challenges were Spell Check (linguistic), Listen Up (musical), See Saw Stack (physical), Lone Shape (visual), Faces (social), and Power Shopper (logical).)	Spin a Speech (Note: Regardless of the word count indicated in the parentheses, the final rankings were decided by guest judge Cynthia Dale.)	Pipe Fitters	Ultimate Elimination (Note: In order, the Ultimate Elimination challenges were Charged Up (physical; won by Danica), Stack of Shapes (visual; won by Danica), Music Match (musical; won by Sandra), Tip the Scales (logical; won by Sandra), and Scrambled (linguistic; won by Danica).)	Speed Round (Note: In order, the Speed Round challenges were Human Calculator (logical), Mixed Emotions (social), Balanced Meal (physical), Music Match (musical), The Write Whey (linguistic), and Spin Cycle (visual).)	Human Lie Detector (Note: The special guest who received the polygraph test was Kaetlyn Osmond.)	Twisty	Ultimate Elimination (Note: In order, the Ultimate Elimination challenges were Twisted Tower (physical; won by Alexia), Card Craze (visual; won by Alexia), and See and Say (linguistic; won by Alexia).)	Rhythm Redux (Note: The special guest who beatboxed the rhythms was KRNFX.) (Note: The challenge finished once five contestants received 5 points. Scores shown indicate how many rounds contestants required to submit 5 correct answers.)	This Just In (Note: The special guest who read the fictional news reports was Peter Mansbridge.)	Revolving Door	Concession	Super Gauntlet
Place	Contestant	Speed Round	Cake Mix	Tower of Intelligence	Ultimate Elimination	Speed Round	Factory Fiasco	Letter Chaos	Ultimate Elimination	Speed Round	Laser Labyrinth	Double Take	Ultimate Elimination	Speed Round	Spin a Speech	Pipe Fitters	Ultimate Elimination	Speed Round	Human Lie Detector	Tune (Note: Contestants were given a five-second penalty for each time they either contacted the bar or hit an incorrect note.)	Ultimate Elimination	Rhythm Redux	This Just In	Revolving Door	Conundrum	Super Gauntlet
1st	Mateus	1 WIN (84%)	IMM			2 IN (84%)	2 SAFE	IMM		4 IN (78%)	1 WIN (2:16+0:30=2:46)	IMM		5 IN (78%)	4 IN (11)	2 SAFE	IMM	FINALIST				2 IN (5 of 6)	4 IN (10) (Note: Liam H. and Mateus both received a score of 10. The tie was settled by how quickly they selected their correct words. Since Mateus selected his faster than Liam H. did, the former advanced to the next round and the latter was eliminated from the competition.)	1 IN (3)	1 IN (1:53)	WINNER
2nd	Alexia	11 IN (58%)	1 WIN (12)	IMM		1 WIN (86%)	IMM			8 OUT (60%)	ELIMINATED							1 IN (84%)	2 IN (2)	2 IN (1:21+0:50=2:11)	RET (3-0)	3 IN (5 of 8)	1 IN (14)	1 IN (3)	2 IN (2:04)	RUNNER-UP
3rd	Matthew Y.	9 IN (61%)	4 IN (7) (Note: Arjun and Danica, Liam V. and Sandra, and Matthew Y. and Zoe all received a score of 7. The tie was settled by the rankings of the Speed Round. As a result, the former four became safe from elimination and the latter two had to compete in the next challenge.)	2 SAFE	IMM	4 IN (76%)	3 IN (Note: Arjun and Zoe and Danica and Matthew Y. were all told to stop after Ashley correctly assembled all of her gears and spun them since only two pairs contestants would become safe from elimination after the challenge.)	3 IN (7)	WIN (3-1)	5 IN (76%)	1 WIN (2:16+0:30=2:46)	IMM		3 IN (80%)	5 IN (5)	1 WIN	IMM	FINALIST				3 IN (5 of 8)	3 IN (11)	1 IN (3)	3 OUT (2:08)	ELIMINATED
4th	Liam V.	4 IN (79%)	3 SAFE (7)	IMM		7 IN (70%)	1 WIN	IMM		1 WIN (88%)	IMM			1 IN (88%)	1 WIN (18)	IMM		FINALIST				3 IN (5 of 8)	2 IN (12)	4 OUT (2)	ELIMINATED	
5th	Liam H.	7 IN (68%)	5 IN (4)	3 IN (Note: Liam H. and Zoe were both told to stop after Matthew Y. finished building his tower since only two contestants would become safe from elimination after the challenge.)	OUT (2-3)	ELIMINATED												2 IN (82%)	2 IN (2)	1 RET (0:45+1:05=1:50)	IMM	1 IN (5 of 5)	5 OUT (10)	ELIMINATED		
6th	Danica	3 IN (80%)	2 SAFE (7)	IMM		4 IN (76%)	3 IN	1 WIN (12)	IMM	3 IN (80%)	3 IN (2:08+1:50=4:08) (Note: Although Danica made 11 errors when navigating through the laser labyrinth, she was erroneously penalized for 12 errors instead, which resulted in Ashley and Danica's official total time being 4:08 instead of 3:58. However, a correct penalization would not have affected their placement.)	3 IN (4)	WIN (3-2)	3 IN (80%)	2 IN (14)	3 IN (Note: Danica and Sandra were both told to stop after Mateus finished filling his vessel up to the marked line since only two contestants would become safe from elimination after the challenge.)	WIN (3-2)	FINALIST				6 OUT (4 of 8)	ELIMINATED			
7th	Sandra	5 IN (76%)	3 SAFE (7)	IMM		6 IN (73%)	1 WIN	IMM		7 IN (64%)	2 IN (2:00+1:40=3:40)	1 WIN (5)	IMM	2 IN (84%)	3 IN (12)	3 IN	OUT (2-3)	8 OUT (64%)	ELIMINATED							
8th	Zoe	8 IN (65%)	4 IN (7)	3 IN	WIN (3-2)	9 IN (60%)	3 IN	2 SAFE (10)	IMM	6 IN (72%)	2 IN (2:00+1:40=3:40)	2 SAFE (5)	IMM	6 OUT (76%)	ELIMINATED			7 OUT (66%)	ELIMINATED							
9th	Ashley	6 IN (70%)	5 IN (4)	1 WIN	IMM	3 IN (80%)	2 SAFE	IMM		2 IN (82%)	3 IN (2:08+1:50=4:08)	4 IN (3)	OUT (2-3)	ELIMINATED				4 IN (75%)	6 OUT (0)	ELIMINATED						
10th	Arjun	2 IN (82%)	2 SAFE (7)	IMM		8 IN (65%)	3 IN	3 IN (7)	OUT (1-3)	ELIMINATED								5 IN (71%)	5 OUT (1)	ELIMINATED						
11th	Misuzu	10 IN (60%)	1 WIN (12)	IMM		10 OUT (56%)	ELIMINATED											6 IN (70%)	2 IN (2)	4 OUT (1:25+1:00=2:25)	ELIMINATED					
12th	Matthew S.	12 OUT (54%)	ELIMINATED															3 IN (76%)	1 IN (3)	3 IN (0:55+1:25=2:20)	OUT (0-3)	ELIMINATED				

WINNER This contestant won the competition.
RUNNER-UP This contestant finished in second place.
WIN This contestant finished first in the challenge and became safe from elimination for the episode.
SAFE This contestant performed well enough in the challenge to be safe from elimination for the episode.
IN This contestant was neither safe from elimination nor eliminated after their performance in the challenge.
IMM This contestant did not compete in the challenge because they were already safe from elimination.
OUT This contestant was eliminated from the competition at the end of the challenge.
ELIMINATED This contestant has already been eliminated from the competition.
FINALIST This contestant did not participate in the Redemption episode because they had already qualified for the finale.
IN This contestant was neither safe from elimination nor eliminated from the Redemption episode after their performance in the challenge.
RET This contestant returned to the competition after the Redemption episode and qualified for the finale as a result.
IMM This contestant did not compete in the challenge because they had already qualified to return to the competition at a prior point in the Redemption episode.
OUT This contestant was eliminated from the Redemption episode and failed to return to the competition as a result.
Denotes a challenge that is based on linguistic intelligence.
Denotes a challenge that is based on physical intelligence.
Denotes a challenge that is based on musical intelligence.
Denotes a challenge that is based on visual intelligence.
Denotes a challenge that is based on social intelligence.
Denotes a challenge that is based on logical intelligence.
