= Crash Gallery =

- Genre: Reality
- Presented by: Sean O'Neill
- Country of origin: Canada
- No. of seasons: 2
- No. of episodes: 6

Production
- Producer: Lark Productions
- Running time: 60 minutes

Original release
- Network: CBC Television
- Release: October 2, 2015 – March 5, 2017

Crash Gallery is a Canadian television reality series that premiered on October 2, 2015, on CBC Television. Hosted by Sean O'Neill, each episode of the series pitted three artists against each other in a creative competition.

The series was not renewed for a third season.
