= Keeping Canada Alive =

Canadian television documentary series

- Genre: Docu-drama
- Country of origin: Canada
- No. of episodes: 6

Production
- Producer: Force Four Entertainment
- Running time: 60 minutes

Original release
- Network: CBC Television
- Release: October 4 – November 8, 2015

Keeping Canada Alive is a Canadian television documentary series that premiered October 4, 2015 on CBC Television.

Narrated by Kiefer Sutherland, the six-episode series provides a view of Canada's health care system. Over a 24-hour period in May 2015, production crews in 24 cities across Canada filmed the inner workings of hospitals and other medical facilities. In addition to the six televised episodes, additional footage is available from the program's website.
