= Interrupt This Program =

- Also known as: Resilient cities
- Genre: Documentary
- Country of origin: Canada
- No. of seasons: 3
- No. of episodes: 18

Production
- Running time: 30 minutes
- Production company: Noble Television

Original release
- Network: CBC Television
- Release: November 6, 2015

Interrupt This Program is a Canadian documentary series that premiered November 6, 2015 on CBC Television. It is known as Resilient Cities in some markets.

A five-part documentary series about the role of art as a tool of political protest and social change, each episode centres on the creative community in a world city recovering from some form of social crisis, such as war, disaster or political upheaval. The first season's episodes are set in Beirut, Kyiv, Athens, Port-au-Prince, and Medellín. Each episode profiles several young artists working in the city, including at least one expatriate Canadian. The series aims to change perceptions about the cities and allow artists to tell their own stories.
