= List of programs broadcast by Much =

The fifth and current logo of Much. It has been in use since September 2013.

This is a list of television programs and specials formerly and currently broadcast by Canadian channel Much regularly and irregularly, as of October 2025.

== Current programming ==
=== Acquired Canadian programming ===
- Cash Cab
- Comedy Now!
- Corner Gas
- Just for Laughs Gags

=== Acquired from MTV ===
- The Challenge
- Jersey Shore: Family Vacation
- Ridiculousness

=== Acquired from Max ===
- Conan O'Brien Must Go

=== Acquired from VH1 ===
- Wild n Out

=== Repeats ===
- American Ninja Warrior
- Anthony Bourdain: Parts Unknown
- Dark Side of the 90s
- Futurama
- Late Night with Seth Meyers
- Seinfeld
- The Simpsons
- The Tonight Show Starring Jimmy Fallon
- Wipeout (2021)

== Former programming ==
=== #-E ===
- The $100,000 Pyramid
- Adam Ruins Everything
- All Muscle with Funkmaster Flex
- Al Music
- The Almost Impossible Gameshow
- Alternatino with Arturo Castro
- America's Best Dance Crew
- America's Next Top Model
- American Dad!
- Anger Management
- Another Period
- Arrow
- The Ashlee Simpson Show
- The Assets
- Awkward.
- Awkwafina Is Nora from Queens
- Backtrax
- The Beaverton
- Beavis and Butt-Head
- BECK: Mongolian Chop Squad
- Becoming
- Benders
- The Bernie Mac Show
- The Beaverton
- Big Ticket
- Big Time in Hollywood, FL
- Blossom
- Born to Be
- Bounty Hunters
- BradTV
- Broad City
- Buffy the Vampire Slayer
- Bunk
- Burning Love
- Cable in the Classroom
- California Dreams
- Celebrity Deathmatch
- Chappelle's Show
- Childrens Hospital
- City Limits
- Class of 3000
- Classic Much Mega Hits
- The Cleveland Show
- Clip Trip
- Clone High
- Clueless
- Coca-Cola Countdown
- The CollegeHumor Show
- Combat Des Clips
- Combat Zone
- Comedy Bang! Bang!
- Comedy Central Stand-Up Presents
- Community
- Conan
- The Conventioneers
- COPS
- Da Mix
- Daddy's Girls
- Daria
- Death Valley
- Degrassi
- Deon Cole's Black Box
- Detroiters
- Disband
- Discovered
- Dogg After Dark
- Doin' Costa Rica
- The DownLo
- Drawn Together
- Drunk History
- E! True Hollywood Story (confined to musician-focused episodes)
- Ed the Sock
- Ed's Big Wham Bam! (special)
- Egos and Icons
- Electric Circus
- Everybody Hates Chris
- Exit
- Exposed

=== F-J ===
- Fameless
- Family Guy
- Fandemonium
- FAX
- Finding Carter
- The Flash
- French Kiss
- Freshly Pressed
- Friends
- Fromage
- Fugget About It
- Funniest Wins
- Garfunkel and Oates
- Gigi Does It
- Go with the Flow
- Going Coastal
- Gonna Meet A Rock Star
- Gossip Girl
- Got To Dance UK
- Gotham
- Greek
- Guy Code
- Hang Time
- The Hard Times of RJ Berger
- The Haunting Hour: The Series
- Hellcats
- Hip-Hop Squares
- Hollywood Game Night
- I Live with Models
- Idiotsitter
- The Inbetweeners
- Inside Amy Schumer
- Instant Star
- Intimate and Interactive
- The IT List
- The Jack and Triumph Show
- Jack Osbourne: Adrenaline Junkie
- Jackass
- Jeff & Some Aliens
- The Jeselnik Offensive
- Jessica Simpson's Price of Beauty
- Jimmy Kimmel Live!
- The Joker's Wild

=== K-O ===
- Kelly Osbourne: Turning Japanese
- Kingdom
- Kroll Show
- The L.A. Complex
- Late Night with Jimmy Fallon
- The Launch
- Legends of Chamberlain Heights
- Legends of Tomorrow
- Letterkenny
- Life on Venus Ave.
- Love Court
- Lucifer
- Make It or Break It
- Malcolm in The Middle
- Match Game
- Men at Work
- @midnight
- Mike & Mike's Excellent X-Canada Adventures
- Moonbeam City
- MTV's Top Pop Group
- Much 911
- Much AXS TV
- Much Countdown
- Much East
- Much in Your Space
- Much Spring Break
- Much West - hosted by Terry David Mulligan; featured music from Canada's West Coast scene
- MuchAdrenaline
- MuchOnDemand
- MuchNews Weekly
- Music Is My Life
- My Date With...
- My Own
- Nathan for You
- The New Music
- Newlyweds: Nick and Jessica
- Newsreaders
- The Next: Fame Is at Your Doorstep
- Not Safe with Nikki Glaser
- The O.C.
- Odd Job Jack
- The Office
- Oh Sit!
- One Hit Wonders
- One Tree Hill
- One World
- Outlaws & Heroes - focused on country music
- Out There

=== P-T ===
- Pants Off Dance Off
- Paris Hilton's My New BFF
- Parks and Recreation
- Perez Hilton All Access
- The Pete Holmes Show
- Pimp My Ride
- Pop-Up Video
- Power 30
- Power Hour
- Pretty Little Liars
- Problematic with Moshe Kasher
- Producing Parker
- Punk'd
- Pussycat Dolls Present: The Search for the Next Doll
- R U the Girl
- The Ren & Stimpy Show
- Review
- Ride with Funkmaster Flex
- Ridiculousness
- Rock School
- RSVP
- rU Receiving
- S Club
- Sabrina, the Teenage Witch
- Saved by the Bell
- Scare Tactics
- Screwed Over
- The Secret Circle
- The Shift
- A Shot at Love
- Signed
- Silent Library (now on MTV2 Canada)
- Sit Down, Shut Up
- So 90's
- So You Think You Can Dance
- So You Think You Can Dance Canada
- Soul in the City
- South of Nowhere
- South Park
- South Side
- Spaceballs: The Animated Series
- The Spoils of Babylon and its sequel The Spoils Before Dying
- Stand Up & Bite Me
- Starmaker
- Stars Gone Wild
- Stars on Trial
- Start Me Up
- StyL'D
- Style Star
- Super Hit Video
- T.I.'s Road to Redemption
- Team Ninja Warrior
- Teen Wolf
- This Is Not Happening
- TMZ
- Test Pattern
- 'Til Death Do Us Part: Carmen and Dave
- Todd and the Book of Pure Evil
- The Tonight Show Starring Jimmy Fallon
- Too Much 4 Much
- Tosh.0
- Total Blackout
- Totally Untrue History Of...
- TripTank

=== U-Z ===
- Ugly Americans
- The Vampire Diaries
- Vice News Tonight
- Video on Trial
- Viva La Bam
- VJ Search
- The WB's Superstar USA
- When I Was 17
- Workaholics
- World's Craziest Fools
- X-Tendamix
- Zach Stone Is Gonna Be Famous

=== Video blocks ===
- #1s
- #trending
- Brand New Sh*t
- Dance Party Friday
- Dedications
- French Kiss - a half-hour-long block of French language music videos
- The Ledge
- Loud
- Much Alternative
- Much Curated By
- Much EDM
- Much Hip-Hop
- Much Mega Hits - an hour-long weekly selection of recent hit videos
- Much Now & Then
- Much Retro Lunch
- Much Spotlight
- MuchTopTens
- MuchVibe
- New.Music.Live
- Playlist
- Power Shift
- The Punk Show
- RapCity
- Spotlight
- Today's Top 10
- UR11
- The Wedge
- Throwback Thursday

=== Annual programming ===
- Brit Awards
- iHeartRadio Much Music Video Awards
- Juno Awards
- Live @ Much
- Live in the Lot
- MTV Europe Music Awards
- MTV Video Music Awards
- Much Presents
- On Set
- Polaris Music Prize
- We Day

== See also ==
- List of programs broadcast by M3
