= Danielle Graham =

Canadian entertainment reporter (born 1980)

- Born: Danielle McGimsie; 1980 (age 45–46); Guelph, Ontario, Canada
- Education: Seneca College
- Occupation: Entertainment reporter
- Years active: 1998–present
- Spouse: Randall Graham (m. 2014)
- Children: 2

Danielle McGimsie Graham (born 1980) is a Canadian entertainment reporter, best known for her work on CTV's etalk. She co-anchored the show along with Tyrone Edwards with Elaine Lui and Traci Melchor as correspondents until being laid off by Bell Media in March 2022.

== Early life ==
McGimsie was born October 21, 1980, and raised in Guelph, Ontario, Canada. She attended Seneca College of Applied Arts and Technology in Toronto graduating with a diploma in Radio and Television Broadcasting.

== Career ==
In 2001, Graham got her start as an intern in the Citytv Toronto newsroom and was later hired on as a floor director for the weekend news. Graham hosted YTV's, The Hit List, for four years before becoming an entertainment reporter for Star! Daily in 2005. Graham has also reported daily entertainment news on A-Channel News at Six and A-Channel News at 11.

Graham officially joined etalk in 2007 as an entertainment reporter and interviewed notable celebrities such as Adele, Ben Affleck, James Franco, Orlando Bloom, Jude Law, Kim Cattrall, Colin Farrell, Michael Caine, Robert Downey Jr., Sarah Furguson, Jennifer Aniston, Anthony Hopkins, Tom Hanks, Katie Holmes, Beyoncé and Taylor Swift.

Graham has covered numerous film festivals, premieres and awards shows which includes the Toronto International Film Festival, Sundance Film Festival, Teen Choice Awards, and the Emmys. She frequently contributes for various CTV News programs such as Canada AM, Toronto's Breaking News CP24 and its morning news program CP24 Breakfast, and CTV News Channel. In 2013, she was promoted to senior reporter for etalk until in 2015 she succeeded Tanya Kim as co-anchor.

Graham has traveled around the world for etalk to report the latest entertainment news, from festivals to set visits on films. She has reported from the Film Independent Spirit Awards, Elton John's post-Oscar Party, Emmy nomination day and Emmy after parties. McGimsie has interviewed, on location, the casts of the films Forgetting Sarah Marshall in Hawaii, Harry Potter in London, England, and Couples Retreat in Bora Bora. She also traveled to Rome, Italy for the Angels & Demons premiere.

In 2022, she filed a lawsuit against Bell Media, owners of CTV's etalk, alleging she was fired in retaliation for challenging gender discrimination against women, including being skipped over for promotion, getting less pay, fewer perks and more requests for free work.

== Personal life ==
In 2014, she married Randall Graham, the creative director of MuchMusic in Parry Sound, Ontario. She has 1 daughter Beatrix Barbara Graham (born July 1, 2016) and another daughter named Marigold James Graham (born January 5, 2020).
