= MuchMusic (disambiguation) =

MuchMusic may refer to:

- MuchMusic, specialty Canadian music and entertainment channel
  - Countdown (MuchMusic), Top 30 countdown program on the station
  - Dedications (MuchMusic)
  - Exposed (MuchMusic series)
  - MuchMusic Video Awards
  - Muchmusic VJ Search
  - List of programs broadcast by MuchMusic
- MuchMusic Brasil, specialty Brazilian music and entertainment channel
- Fuse TV, which was originally the U.S. simulcast of the Canadian MuchMusic
