= VJ Search =

Canadian reality TV series (2006–2013)

VJ Search is the title of a reality television program aired on Canadian music video TV station MuchMusic. Focused on finding a new MuchMusic VJ to join the existing MuchMusic on-air personalities, the original search was a weekend-long on-air live event in 1995, with the first season crafted as a reality series presented in 2006, followed by a season series in 2009 and 2013. By 2014, MuchMusic had reduced its music content significantly, cancelling all VJ hosted programming and dropping "Music" from the station name, rebranding itself as Much. As such, 2013 was the last season of VJ Search.

The winners of the series, who all became MuchMusic VJs, were Tim Deegan in 2006, Liz Trinnear in 2009, and Chloe Wilde in 2013.

Sister channel MusiquePlus held similar VJ recherché contests in 1999, 2005, 2007, 2009 and 2013.

== MuchMusic VJ Search 2006 ==
2006 marked the first year that the VJ Search embarked on a reality series format, consisting of ten episodes over a ten-week period. The show was extended 10 episodes. In previous years, the search for a new VJ took place over a 2-day period, broadcast live on MuchMusic beginning Saturday afternoon and completing on Sunday evening, when a new VJ was crowned. Previous winners include Diego Fuentes (1995), Bradford How (2000) and Devon Soltendieck (2004).

The program documents a team called the VJ Search Team made up of VJs (Matte Babel, Leah Miller, Devon Soltendieck and Sarah Taylor). The team goes on a cross-Canada tour – the VJ Search Team visits 23 cities and make 32 stops from coast to coast – where VJ applicants demonstrate their talent in front of a camera and assembled crowd in shopping malls, university and college campuses.

After decision making by judges, 10 applicants were chosen to participate in the show, filmed in a luxury penthouse in Toronto. Throughout the duration of the program, a process of elimination singles out applicants by their talent. By the end of the 10 episodes, only one person became a MuchMusic VJ. The winner of the 2006 series was Tim Deegan.

VJ Search is hosted by Dina Pugliese.

=== Much VJ Search 2006 Expert Panel ===
- Steve Anthony
- Robin Black
- Traci Melchor
- Kardinal Offishall

=== Much VJ Search 2006 Castoffs ===
- February 13 – Norm Alconcel
- February 20 – Nathalie Morgan
- February 27 – Larissa Tobacco
- March 6 – Rebecca Stacey
- March 13 – Franklin Nwankwo
- March 20 – Casey-Jo Loos and Tim Deegan
- March 27 – Nobody is taken off the air in this episode, though it is announced that one of 6 previous VJ hopefuls will be returning as a wildcard contestant.
- April 3 – Tim Deegan returned to the show as the wildcard.
- April 10 – Erik Bartik is first voted off, followed by Nikki Mah and last Sean Gehon with Tim Deegan winning the final.

=== Much VJ Search 2006 Standings ===
- 10th: Norm
- 9th: Nathalie
- 8th: Larissa
- 7th: Rebecca
- 6th: Frank
- 5th: Casey-Jo
- 4th: Erik
- 3rd: Nikki
- 2nd: Sean
- 1st: Tim

=== 2006 Much VJ Search Episode Recaps ===
- January 30 – Episode 1: Auditions; 20 semi-finalists revealed. Also clips of advice and insight from former MuchMusic VJs.
- February 6 – Episode 2: 20 semi-finalists are flown to Toronto and kept inside the Gladstone Hotel. Each person had to randomly pick either Yellowcard or Our Lady Peace to interview, but they were only allowed to ask them one question. In the elimination, the judges narrowed 20 down to 10.
- February 13 – Episode 3: Remaining 10 move into the penthouse in The Suites at 1 King West and are given the challenge of co-hosting MuchOnDemand. They then have a press party in their penthouse. Norm Aloconcel is voted off for acting like this was 'The Big Norm' show. The full introduction to theme song with all 10 finalists.
- February 20 – Episode 4: 9 finalists are put into 3 groups and are assigned to make a short video for Star! Daily about the upcoming Academy Awards. Nathalie Morgan is voted off because she did not appear on camera in her group's production, though some viewers believe that they did not pick either Erik or Frank to be voted off because they would add to the penthouse drama, therefore giving the show higher ratings. Introduction to the 'Loser Loft', where all cast-offs are sent and are given the opportunity to choose who they want to go off after watching the challenges themselves. However, the remaining finalists are unaware of this factor in the series.
- February 27 – Episode 5: The 8 left have the challenge of practicing their live on-air throws and then get a make-over. Larissa Tobacco is voted off for having terrible throws and not having performed well on any of the other challenges.
- March 6 – Episode 6: The remaining seven are flown off to Edmonton to cover the first anniversary concert of 91.7 the Bounce and provide a story. They were split into two groups: 4 guys against 3 girls. The girls got 1 less member because Rebecca Stacey had the hometown advantage. However, she was voted off for failing as a group leader.
- March 13 – Episode 7: It's down to six and they are flown, once again, to Edmonton to design a promotional shirt for the band Theory of a Deadman. They were split into two teams (Nikki, Erik, and Tim against Frank, Sean and Casey-Jo) and the band chose the design of a white T-shirt made by Nikki, Erik and Tim since it was more concert-friendly. They then had the challenge of selling the winning T-shirt to as many fans at an Edmonton concert as possible, and since Erik managed to sell the most T-shirts in the shortest amount of time he was given the opportunity to interview and introduce the band. Frank Nwankwo is then voted off, mostly because of his attitude, and because other contestants saw him drinking on the job.
- March 20 – Episode 8: The final five are flown to L.A. to do an interview with Covergirl spokesperson, supermodel, and actress Molly Sims. Casey-Jo Loos and Tim Deegan performed the weakest in their interview with the supermodel, and are both taken off the air. It is announced to the viewers at the end of this episode they will be choosing one of the seven people from The Loser Loft that would be given the opportunity to return.
- March 27 – Episode 9: It's down to three, and they are given the challenge to choose the concept for the music video for the show's theme song, What Would You Do? by Lindsay Robins, in which Nikki's idea is picked. They must each then conduct an on-set interview with a person that was working on the shoot. No one is eliminated in this episode, but it is announced to the remaining finalists that someone from the Loser Loft will be coming back.
- April 3 – Episode 10: The first-part of the finale in which the wildcard winner is announced (Tim). Most people think that the fact he looks good/took off his shirt a couple times is one of the few reasons of voting Tim back on. All four finalists are interviewed by Dina and asked a question from a random member in the audience, and then some of their highlights from the show are shown for each finalist. Then, they put all four together in their last challenge: to test their music-knowledge to its full extent. Erik takes an early lead, but Sean surpasses him and goes on to win the competition with 100 points thanks to the question about Cher and all of the image-related questions while Nikki only managed to score 10 points. Fans then find out that they now have the chance to vote for who they feel should be the winner: Erik Bartik, Nicole Mah, Tim Deegan or Sean Gehon.
- April 10 – Finale: The remaining four finalists, Expert Panel, and all five remaining Lost Lofters arrive at Much HQ to a live studio audience once more for the grand finale. First, we look at how the campaign for each of the remaining four finalists turned out in each of their home cities. Then, we see how the judges have acted throughout the show, and after the Losers give their choice as to who will win, all polls stop and Norm Alconcel performs his smash hit 'I'm Not a Loser' live, eliminations began. Erik was sent packing, followed by Nikki, then Sean, thus crowning Tim Deegan as Muchmusic's next VJ.

== Much Music VJ 2.0 2009 ==
VJ 2.0 was the series in 2009 to pick a new VJ for the station. After hundreds of application, 16 were chosen for the show. The series ran in October and November 2009 and sponsored by Doritos.

The Top 18. were:

- Nadine Sykora – Vancouver, BC
- Caity Babcock – Maple Ridge, BC
- Elma Mehmedbegovic – Edmonton, AB
- Kelly Peter – London, ON
- Liz Trinnear – London, ON
- Julian Koehler – Kitchener, ON
- Jessy Pesce – Keswick, ON
- Ashley Stennett – Hamilton, ON
- Andrew Bravener – Oakville, ON
- Lyric James – Mississauga, ON
- Marlon Palmer – Toronto, ON
- Tasia Kemp-Jackson – Toronto, ON
- Laith Hakeem – Richmond Hill, ON
- Asal Hazel – Richmond Hill, ON
- Cody Dobie – Ottawa, ON
- Christina Meng – Montreal, QC
- Alli Walker – Summerside, PEI
- Brodie Chaisson – Bathurst, NB

Hakeem, Palmer, Trinnear and Walker made to the Final Four and the series 2.0 was won by Liz Trinnear who was signed as a VJ for the station.

== Much VJ Search 2013 ==
The Much VJ Search reality show returned on April 1, 2013. 20 VJ hopefuls started in Vancouver and travelled across Canada on the Much Bus with eliminations happening in each stop.

- Vancouver (Kelsey Spencer and Myron Mayne were both eliminated)
- Banff (Brandon Elbaz was eliminated)
- Calgary (Desiree Mark was eliminated)
- Regina (Brian Arcand was eliminated)
- Winnipeg (Justine Williamson was eliminated)
- Thunder Bay (Tyson Geick was eliminated, but came back for the vote back)
- Ottawa (Junior Mbeng was eliminated)
- Toronto (Jasmin Shim and Lauren West were both eliminated)

Once the bus arrived in Toronto, the Top 10 moved into "Camp Much" living in the MuchMusic environment for two weeks. The Top 10 were:

- Boe Vyntage – Toronto, ON
- Nash Elliot – Toronto, ON
- Kyle Whitehead (Selk) – Red Deer, AB
- Alexandria MacFarlane – Vancouver, BC
- Kevy Oh – Toronto, ON
- Madison Pinder – Calgary, AB
- Joshua Tubbs – Toronto, ON
- Tyson Geick – Newmarket, ON (Voted back)
- Ryan Pownall – Ottawa, ON
- Drama Diabolos – Toronto, ON
- Chloe Wilde – Montreal, QC

The finale was on April 26 and the final three hopefuls were Ryan Pownall, Chloe Wilde and Drama Diabolos.

The winner was Chloe Wilde from Montreal, Quebec.
