= New.Music.Live. =

- New.Music.Live. title card in 2013
- Also known as: NML
- Presented by: Lauren Toyota; Phoebe Dykstra; Liz Trinnear; Scott Willats; Chloe Wilde
- Country of origin: Canada

Production
- Production location: Bell Media Queen Street
- Camera setup: Multi-camera
- Running time: 60 minutes

Original release
- Network: MuchMusic
- Release: December 13, 2010 – August 1, 2013

Related
- MuchOnDemand (1997–2010)

New.Music.Live. (often called NML) is a Canadian television program on MuchMusic that premiered on December 13, 2010, and ended on August 1, 2013. The program succeeded MuchOnDemand as the channel's flagship program. It was broadcast live from MuchMusic's studio at 299 Queen Street West in Toronto.

== History ==
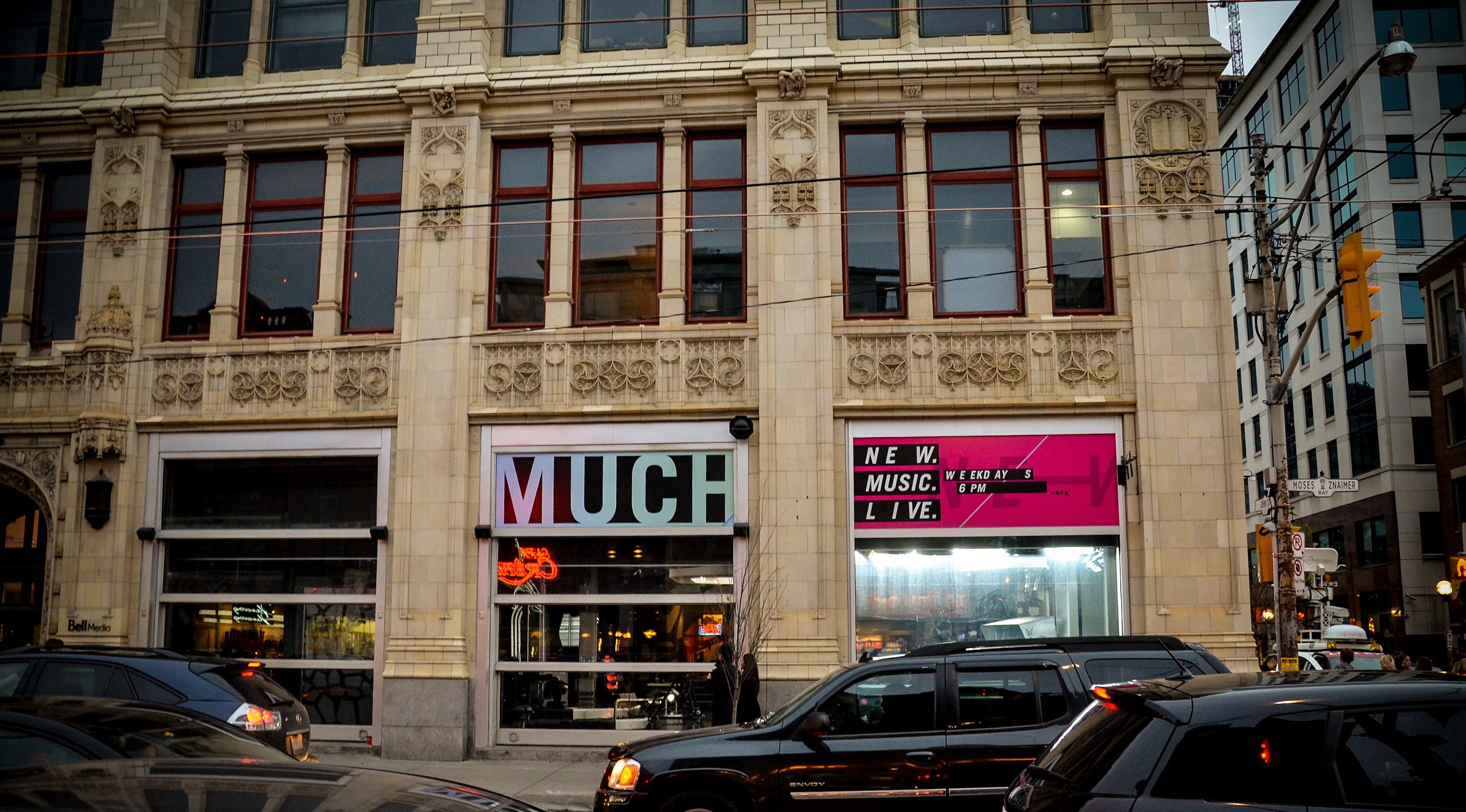
New.Music.Live. at 299 Queen Street West in 2012

New.Music.Live. debuted on December 13, 2010. As a successor to the channel's former flagship program MuchOnDemand, it delivered the news in music and entertainment, new and popular music videos, live performances, and interviews with artists and celebrities. Viewers in Canada could watch at home and interact with the show via Twitter. Although the show wasn't simulcast, international viewers could watched the show online through their website. Tickets were also available through the website to anyone as long as they can make it to the show.

On August 1, 2013, it was announced live on-air and on Twitter that a new show would come in September and that New.Music.Live. would be done. However, fans were getting the message that a new show similar to New.Music.Live. would arrive during fall 2013 based on tweets sent on NML's Twitter feed. All of MuchMusic's in-house shows like Today's Top 10 and Countdown were moved to MTV's new studio in the same building. However, no new show was ever announced. In September 2013, the MuchMusic studio space was taken over by a new CTV talk show The Social and the MuchMusic logo signage was removed.

== VJs ==
NML initially did not use any VJs from MuchOnDemand. The program's first co-hosts were Lauren Toyota, Phoebe Dykstra and Bonn Smith. In the following years, former MuchOnDemand hosts Jesse Giddings and Liz Trinnear began co-hosting NML. Prior to the program's cancellation in 2013, the final hosts of NML were:

- Lauren Toyota — moved to MTV Canada in 2014, no longer with Bell Media
- Phoebe Dykstra — moved to MTV Canada in 2014, left Bell Media
- Liz Trinnear — currently on etalk
- Scott Willats — no longer with Bell Media
- Chloe Wilde — winner of VJ Search 2013, currently on etalk

=== Past hosts ===
- Bonn Smith — one of the original co-hosts
- Kathleen Newman-Bremang
- Jesse Giddings — left MuchMusic for E! News in the United States
