= Sean Gehon =

Canadian television personality (born 1985)

Sean Gehon (born 1985 in Winnipeg, Manitoba) is a Canadian television personality who resides in Vancouver, British Columbia. Gehon worked as a video store employee until joining MuchMusic VJ Search, ending as the first runner-up — and the only openly gay contestant — in the 2006 series that Tim Deegan won.

Gehon subsequently joined MuchMusic's sister channel Star! as an entertainment reporter for the entertainment magazine Star! Daily. He also hosted Best! Movies! Ever!.
