= Nikki Awesome & The Royal Society =

Canadian electropop group

- Origin: Toronto, Ontario, Canada
- Genres: electropop, Pop music, Hip hop music
- Years active: 2008–2010
- Members: Nikki "Awesome" Milovanovic; Christopher "Plus Mo" Wright; Ryan "Slink Breezy Esq" Reid

Nikki Awesome & The Royal Society is a Canadian electropop group from Toronto, Ontario, formed in 2007. The group had three members—lead vocalist Nikki "Awesome" Milovanovic and hip-hop artists Christopher "Plus Mo" Wright and Ryan "Slink Breezy Esq" Reid, and performed Pop music and Hip hop music.

== History ==
In July 2008, the band performed for the first time at Toronto's Wrongbar. That year, they released the single "You Say it was Supposed To Be", which used interpolation from the New Order song "Bizarre Love Triangle" in its chorus. The song got the attention of Care Failure (Caroline Kawa), frontwoman for the band Die Mannequin, who had just founded the label How To Kill Records through Warner Music Canada. The band was the label's first signee and Failure gave Awesome a brief appearance in Die Mannequin's video for "Saved By Strangers".

In September 2008, Slink Breezy witnessed the theft of the KITT car from the Knight Rider series, which was filming in downtown Toronto. The incident was later revealed to be a publicity stunt. Breezy posted the pictures and story on the group's Myspace page, and the story went viral, generating thousands of plays for the group, who were still relatively unknown.

Following receipt of a grant from Much Music's VideoFACT (MuchFACT), The Royal Society released a video for "You Say it was Supposed To Be", which was directed by Davin Black. Black cast Awesome as a Film noir Femme fatale, and Plus Mo and Breezy as detectives in pursuit. The video was added into rotation to Much Music and MuchMore Music (M3) in January 2009, and charted in the Top 10. The song also charted in the top 10 for Canadian radio.

In 2009, now without a label, The Royal Society released two singles, both with videos directed by Black: "All The Little Things" and "You Say". The video for "All The Little Things" was filmed in Peter Gatien's Circa nightclub; the single and video lingered in the top 20 but did not lead to an album deal. The band released their own EP, The Nouveau Riche EP.

Following a tour supporting Flo Rida, Awesome attended the MuchMusic Video Awards alone, and did an interview with Jesse Giddings on MuchOnDemand.

The trio continued to perform together until 2010. In March 2010, Awesome performed alone at Club XS in Toronto during Canadian Music Week, and discussed her launch of DOLLS.

Awesome moved to London and launched DOLLS in 2013. Plus Mo launched his debut project, Cassette Tape $#!+ in 2018.

== Discography ==
- The Nouveau Riche EP, 2009, Independent
- "You Say it was Supposed To Be", (Single) 2008, Independent
- "All The Little Things", (Single) 2009, Independent
- "You Say", (Single) 2009, Independent
