= Larysa Harapyn =

Canadian media personality (born 1973)

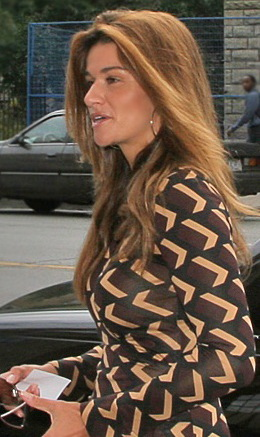
- Harapyn at the 2007 Toronto International Film Festival
- Born: c. 1973
- Occupations: Journalist - Financial Post; former entertainment reporter on Citytv

Larysa Harapyn (born c. 1973) is a Canadian media personality, who was a news anchor at the now-defunct Sun News Network. She was an entertainment reporter on Citytv in Toronto and was an anchor on the Star! Daily program seen throughout Canada on the Star! specialty channel. In 2007, she was one of a number of staffers who worked both at Citytv and at CTV, but later left CTV. In December 2008, Rogers (the new owners of Citytv) eliminated the CityNews entertainment unit, including Harapyn. She then worked as a journalist with the Financial Post.

Harapyn started in the CHUM family at all-news station CablePulse 24 and quickly became an entertainment reporter on the regular news broadcasts. She has interviewed notable personalities including Lenny Kravitz, Lois Bromfield, David F. Boone, Rich Hall and Ryan Hamilton. She has also hosted some entertainment specials including Everything Hef (about Playboy magazine founder Hugh Hefner) and a pre-game show to the Academy Awards. Harapyn also showed her comedic side by appearing in a number of Citytv commercials, promoting upcoming movies on the station.

Harapyn is of Ukrainian descent. She was briefly a model before she came to Citytv and has two brothers, Roman and Ihor. She is a former student at York University.

In 2002, Harapyn posed for Oxygen, a Canadian fitness magazine.

In mid-2014 Harapyn began working at the Sun News Network as a "Hard News anchor". She gives news updates on the half-hour. The channel ceased operations in February 2015. Harapyn is now with the National Post's Financial Post as print and media journalist.
