= TIFF Tribute Awards =

Annual Canadian filmmaking award

The TIFF Tribute Awards are an annual award, presented by the Toronto International Film Festival to honour distinguished achievements in filmmaking.

Unlike the festival's regular awards, which are presented based on audience or jury voting during the festival, the TIFF Tribute Awards are presented to people or organizations selected by the board and announced in advance of the festival. Recipients are selected from among the cast and crew of the films in that year's festival lineup. Until 2022, the awards were presented as being for their work on that specific film in the program — however, as the 2023 Toronto International Film Festival coincided with the 2023 SAG-AFTRA strike, under which actors were not permitted to accept awards for their performances but could still accept lifetime achievement awards, that year's awards were presented for general career achievements rather than particular works, with the awards later reverting back to being presented for the individual films again.

The awards were presented for the first time at the 2019 Toronto International Film Festival. They are organized in part as a fundraiser, with proceeds from audience ticket sales used to help fund various TIFF programs and initiatives.

At both the 2020 Toronto International Film Festival and the 2021 Toronto International Film Festival, due to the COVID-19 pandemic in Canada the Tribute Awards were conducted as partially prerecorded television broadcasts rather than live gala ceremonies. The presentations were broadcast by CTV Television Network, and hosted by Tyrone Edwards and Chloe Wilde of CTV's eTalk, and also featured the announcement of the finalists and winners for the People's Choice Award. With the 2022 Toronto International Film Festival returning to in-person screenings, the 2022 Tribute Awards were not televised; with the 2022 ceremony scheduled for early in the festival run rather than the conclusion, it also did not include People's Choice announcements.

== Categories ==
Awards are presented in five main categories: Actor, with two performers honoured each year; Director, honouring a film director; Artisan, honouring a craftsperson in a behind the scenes role such as cinematography, editing or sound; Emerging Talent, honouring a film director for their first or second feature film; and the Impact Award, honouring a figure whose work has been dedicated to social change. A sixth award, the Share Her Journey Groundbreaker Award, was introduced in 2022 for women who have made outstanding contributions to improving the conditions of other women in the film industry; actress Michelle Yeoh was the inaugural recipient. An additional Special Tribute award may be presented at the TIFF board's discretion, to honour a person for distinguished achievements in other fields not covered by one of the main categories; it has been most commonly, but not exclusively, presented to a musician with significant film soundtrack credits who was the subject of a retrospective documentary film screening at that year's festival.

The Impact Award was presented in the inaugural year to the film studio Participant Media, with CEO Jeffrey Skoll accepting the award on the company's behalf; the company subsequently signed on as a direct sponsor of that award, which has since been known as the Jeff Skoll Award in Impact Media.

The 2022 awards marked the first time that one of the actor awards was presented to an ensemble cast instead of an individual performer.

In 2023, TIFF introduced the Norman Jewison Award, a career achievement award presented to Canadians whose careers in entertainment have had a global impact.

In 2024, TIFF also announced the creation of an honorary chair position for the Tribute Awards program.

== Recipients ==
Year	Award	Recipient	Ref
2019	Actor Award	Joaquin Phoenix for his work as an actor in the movie Joker	
2019	Actor Award	Meryl Streep for her work as an actress in the movie The Laundromat	
2019	Director Award	Taika Waititi for his movie Jojo Rabbit	
2019	Variety Artisan Award	Roger Deakins for his cinematography to the movie 1917	
2019	Emerging Talent Award	Mati Diop for her movie Atlantics	
2019	Impact Award	Participant Media	
2019	Special Tribute	David Foster	
2020	Actor Award	Anthony Hopkins for his work as an actor in the movie The Father	
2020	Actor Award	Kate Winslet for her work as an actress in the movie Ammonite	
2020	Director Award	Chloé Zhao for her movie Nomadland	
2020	Variety Artisan Award	Terence Blanchard for his score to the movie One Night in Miami	
2020	Emerging Talent Award	Tracey Deer for her movie Beans	
2020	Jeff Skoll Award in Impact Media	Mira Nair	
2021	Actor Award	Jessica Chastain for her work as an actress in the movie The Eyes of Tammy Faye	
2021	Actor Award	Benedict Cumberbatch for his work as an actor in the movies The Power of the Dog and The Electrical Life of Louis Wain	
2021	Director Award	Denis Villeneuve for his movie Dune	
2021	Variety Artisan Award	Ari Wegner for her cinematography on the movies The Power of the Dog and Zola	
2021	Emerging Talent Award	Danis Goulet for her movie Night Raiders	
2021	Jeff Skoll Award in Impact Media	Alanis Obomsawin	
2021	Special Tribute	Dionne Warwick	
2022	Actor Award	Harry Styles, Emma Corrin, Gina McKee, Linus Roache, David Dawson and Rupert Everett for their work as a cast on the movie My Policeman	
2022	Actor Award	Brendan Fraser for his work as an actor on the movie The Whale	
2022	Director Award	Sam Mendes for his movie Empire of Light	
2022	Variety Artisan Award	Hildur Guðnadóttir for her score to the movie Women Talking	
2022	Emerging Talent Award	Sally El Hosaini for her movie The Swimmers	
2022	Jeff Skoll Award in Impact Media	Buffy Sainte-Marie	
2022	Share Her Journey Groundbreaker Award	Michelle Yeoh	
2023	Norman Jewison Award	Shawn Levy	
2023	Performer Award	Colman Domingo	
2023	Performer Award	Vicky Krieps	
2023	Director Honor	Spike Lee	
2023	Variety Artisan Award	Łukasz Żal	
2023	Emerging Talent Award	Carolina Markowicz	
2023	Jeff Skoll Award in Impact Media	Pedro Almodóvar	
2023	Share Her Journey Groundbreaker Award	Patricia Arquette	
2023	Special Tribute Award	Andy Lau	
2024	Honorary Chair	Sandra Oh	
2024	Norman Jewison Award	David Cronenberg	
2024	Performer Award	Amy Adams	
2024	Performer Award	Jharrel Jerome	
2024	Director Award	Mike Leigh	
2024	Variety Artisan Award	Camille Dalmais, Clément Ducol	
2024	Emerging Talent Award	Durga Chew-Bose	
2024	Jeff Skoll Award in Impact Media	Angelina Jolie	
2024	Share Her Journey Groundbreaker Award	Cate Blanchett	
2024	Special Tribute Award	Zhao Tao	
2025	Honorary Chair	Brendan Fraser	
2025	Norman Jewison Award	Catherine O'Hara	
2025	Performer Award	Nina Hoss	
2025	Performer Award	Channing Tatum	
2025	Director Award	Guillermo del Toro	
2025	Variety Artisan Award	Kazu Hiro	
2025	Emerging Talent Award	Hikari	
2025	Jeff Skoll Award in Impact Media	Idris Elba	
2025	Share Her Journey Groundbreaker Award	Jodie Foster	
2025	Special Tribute Award	Lee Byung-hun	
2025	Special Tribute Award	Zacharias Kunuk	
2025	Special Tribute Award	Jafar Panahi	
2026	Norman Jewison Award	Seth Rogen	
2026	Performer Award	Rosalind Eleazar	
2026	Performer Award	Isabelle Huppert	
2026	Director Award	Lee Chang-dong	
2026	Variety Artisan Award	Adam Pietkiewicz	
2026	Emerging Talent Award	Bassam Tariq	
2026	Jeff Skoll Award in Impact Media	Siân Heder	
2026	Share Her Journey Groundbreaker Award	Helen Mirren	
2026	Special Tribute Award	Penélope Cruz	
2026	Special Tribute Award	Fan Bingbing	
