= Gehon =

Gehon is a surname. Notable people with the surname include:

- Francis Gehon (1797–1849), American politician in Iowa
- Sean Gehon (born 1985), Canadian television personality
