= List of programs broadcast by E! (Canadian TV channel) =

This is a list of television programs formerly and currently broadcast by the Canadian television channel E!, formerly known as Star! until November 29, 2010. Since that date, original programming from the flagship American channel often is premiered in a simulcast day-and-date.

== Current programming ==
=== Original programming ===
- Brave New Girls
- Celebrity Style Story
- Pop Quiz

=== Acquired from E! ===
- The Comment Section
- 10 Things You Don't Know
- Celebrity Call Center
- "Colin & Justin's Home Heist"
- E! News
- Botched
- Fashion Police
- Flip it like Disick
- Keeping Up with the Kardashians
- Revenge Body with Khloe Kardashian
- Very Cavallari
- Live From the Red Carpet
- New Money
- "NUMB3RS"
- "Pop Life"
- The Royals
- Secret Societies of Hollywood
- The Soup
- "The Social"
- "Transplant"
- Stewarts & Hamiltons
- Total Divas
- Overserved with Lisa Vanderpump
- E! True Hollywood Story
- Dr. 90210
- Total Bellas

=== Other acquired series ===
- Beyond the Gates
- Botched
- Cash Cab
- Corner Gas
- Criminal Minds
- Elementary
- Escape to the Country
- Flashpoint
- Friends
- The Good Doctor
- Holmes on Homes
- MasterChef Canada
- Ridiculousness

== Former programming ==
This is a list of programs that have previously been broadcast under both the Star! and E! identities.

=== A-E ===
- Access Hollywood
- Action!
- American Idol Extra
- America's Next Top Model
- The Anna Nicole Show
- Arts & Minds
- Australia's Next Top Model
- Awesome 80s
- Back In...
- Back In...Love
- Battle of the Stars
- Because I Said So
- Being Human
- Best! Movies! Ever!
- Big Hollywood Countdown
- Books Into Film
- Bridalplasty
- Britain's Next Top Model
- Canada's Next Top Model
- Celebrity Poker Showdown
- Chelsea Lately
- Child Star Confidential
- City Lights
- Daily 10
- Daily Pop
- Design
- Directors
- Dish Nation
- The Ellen DeGeneres Show
- Everything

=== F-J ===
- FashionTelevision
- The Fashionista Diaries
- Girls Next Door
- Gogglebox
- Holly's World
- Hollywood & Vines
- Hollywood Hold'em
- I Heart
- I Pity the Fool
- Ice Loves Coco
- In Fashion
- It's Good to Be...
- Jimmy Kimmel Live!
- Just Shoot Me!

=== K-O ===
- Katie and Peter
- Kendra
- Khloe and Lamar
- Late Night with Jimmy Fallon
- Linehan
- Listed
- Look-A-Like
- Make Me A Star
- Making It
- Married to Rock
- Movie Night
- Movie Television
- My Name Is Earl
- On Screen
- One Shot
- Oprah's Big Give

=== P-T ===
- Party @ The Palms
- Popaganda
- The Producers
- Revealed with Jules Asner
- Rich Kids of Beverly Hills
- Saved By The Bell
- Sex Matters
- So You Think You Can Dance Canada
- South Sydney Story
- Star! at the Movies
- Star! Attraction
- Star! Close Up
- Star Culture
- Star! Daily
- Star Dates
- Star! Inside
- Star! on the Red Carpet
- Star Portraits
- Star! Specials
- Star Treatment
- Starstruck
- Startv
- Starville
- Style Her Famous
- Talk Soup
- Taradise
- This Is
- This Is David Gest
- The Tonight Show with Jay Leno
- tvFrames
- The View

=== U-Z ===
- Welcome to the Parker
- Who Wore It Better?
- Wild On!
