= Tyrone Edwards =

Canadian television personality

- Occupations: Television broadcaster, entrepreneur
- Years active: 2000s–present
- Known for: Co-host of eTalk, host of RapCity
- Notable work: 1LoveTO, See You Soon Toronto, Miss Likklemore's
- Television: eTalk, RapCity, Change & Action: Racism in Canada
- Awards: Canadian Screen Award nominations (2024)

Tyrone Edwards is a Canadian television broadcaster and entrepreneur, currently the cohost of CTV's entertainment magazine show eTalk.

He first became locally prominent in Toronto in the 2000s as a partner in 1LoveTO, a Toronto community and entertainment blog which expanded by 2011 into a clothing line. In 2011 he was hired by MuchMusic as the new host of RapCity, and served as an entertainment reporter and host for sister station E!. He joined eTalk as a reporter in 2018.

In June 2020 he was a cohost with CTV's Anne-Marie Mediwake, Marci Ien and Elaine Lui of Change & Action: Racism in Canada, a public affairs special created by the network in response to the global anti-racism protests that followed the murder of George Floyd and the concurrent Canadian controversy around the death of Regis Korchinski-Paquet. He was announced as the new cohost of eTalk, replacing Ben Mulroney, on September 14; the following day, he was cohost with his eTalk colleague Chloe Wilde of the TIFF Tribute Awards telecast for the 2020 Toronto International Film Festival. Edwards and Lui appeared as themselves hosting eTalk in the episode "Rose" of Crave's sports romance drama Heated Rivalry.

In addition to his television work, he is a partner in Miss Likklemore's, a Caribbean food restaurant on Queen Street West. During the COVID-19 pandemic in Canada, Edwards and his original 1LoveTO partners also launched See You Soon Toronto, a special clothing line whose profits were donated entirely to charities assisting workers impacted by the pandemic shutdowns.

He received two Canadian Screen Award nominations at the 12th Canadian Screen Awards in 2024 for his work with eTalk, in the categories of Best Host, Talk Show or Entertainment News (alongside Traci Melchor, Elaine Lui, Chloe Wilde, Sonia Mangat, Liz Trinnear and Priyanka) for the regular daily series, and Best Host, Live Entertainment Special (alongside Melchor and Lui) for the program's 95th Academy Awards special.
