= When Everything Feels Like the Movies =

2014 book by Raziel Reid

- First edition
- Author: Raziel Reid
- Cover artist: Photograph copyright Getty Images (by Frank P. Wartenberg); Cover design by Gerilee McBride
- Language: English
- Genre: Young Adult
- Published: 2014 (Arsenal Pulp Press)
- Publication place: Canada
- Media type: Print (paperback)
- Pages: 171 pp. (1st paperback edition)
- ISBN: 978-1-55152-574-7

When Everything Feels Like the Movies is the debut young adult novel by Raziel Reid. The novel is narrated by the protagonist, Jude Rothesay, from a first-person perspective, and details his experiences and difficulties over a few days as a gay teenager in school. Reid was inspired by the events leading up to the 2008 murder of Larry King in Oxnard, California, as he perceived parallels between his life and King's life.

== Plot ==
Jude Rothesay struggles with relationships at school (where he has unrequited crushes on boys, which he discusses his best friend, Angela) and at home (where he steals tips and clothes from his exotic dancer mother and tries to avoid his uninterested stepfather, Ray). The story, as narrated by Jude, recasts his reality as the set of a movie starring Jude, with other students playing bit parts ("The Extras"), as central to his life and fantasies ("The Movie Stars"), or as heckling bullies ("The Paparazzi").

== Major themes ==
The novel is notable for its frank treatment of a gay youth's first sexual experiences, the consequences of homophobic bullying, and the difficulty faced by gay youth growing up in a small-town environment.

== Development history ==
Reid recalled being bullied about his sexual orientation as early as kindergarten, and by Grade 6, "was leaving school in tears pretty much daily." An opening monologue by Ellen DeGeneres on her show in 2008, when she described the life and death of Californian gay teen Larry King, planted the seed that he would later develop into the novel. Reid has said that Jude is a self-portrait.

=== Publication history ===
- — (2014). When Everything Feels Like the Movies (1st pbk. ed.). Vancouver, British Columbia: Arsenal Pulp Press. ISBN 978-1-55152-574-7.
- — (2014). When Everything Feels Like the Movies (EPUB ed.). Vancouver, British Columbia: Arsenal Pulp Press. ISBN 978-1-55152-575-4.
- — (14 April 2015). When Everything Feels Like the Movies. London, England: Corsair. ISBN 978-1-47215-125-4.
- — (1 March 2016). Movie Star. Translated by Peschke, Peter (1st German ed.). Germany: Albino-Verlag. ISBN 978-3-95985-082-7.
- — (4 August 2016). When Everything Feels Like the Movies. London, England: Atom. ISBN 978-1-47215-127-8.
- — (2 November 2016). When Everything Feels Like the Movies (1st UK hdbk. ed.). United Kingdom: Little, Brown Book Group. ISBN 978-1-47215-126-1.
- — (23 October 2020). Un Jour Je Serai Trop Célèbre (1st FR. ed.). Paris, France: La Belle Colère. ISBN 978-2843379536.

== Reception ==
National Post book editor Emily M. Keeler was effusive in her praise for the novel, calling it "a fun, glamorous romp ... like a contemporary, teen reference to Djuna Barnes's modernist queer masterpiece Nightwood." Judi Tichacek, reviewing the novel for the American Library Association, praised the story and pacing, noting "the book's relatability [sic] is one of the reasons why Jude's story is so compelling." The Guardian also praised the novel as unique and stylish because of its origins from the murder of King: "It's incomparable, and it's completely unlike anything you've ever read before ... Raziel's writing style is again one of those things which I've never seen the like of before ..."

Though admitting he had only "read the first chapter and some excerpts, enough to get a taste", Brian Lilley criticized the novel's "nonstop stories of sex" and "[glorification of] casual sex." Barbara Kay criticized the main character as "sexually adult, but socially infantile" as the "'authentic' narcissism of queer/transgender identity exempts one from the obligation to mature." Kay also criticizes the central structure of the novel, saying that "life as a movie begins as a clever trope, but after hundreds of references ... it wears thin." Reid shrugged off Kay's criticism, noting that many jurors serving on the first trial of King's murderer felt more sympathy for the murderer than the victim, and asserting that society "can't feel sorry for a murdered queer unless he lived as a saint." Jude was deliberately written as a "detached and damaged digital youth," precisely "values-void" to take Kay's term.

Author Kathy Clark started an online petition asking for the revocation of the Governor General's Award due to the "graphic nature" of the novel. In response to the Clark petition and Kay's column criticizing the novel, Steven Galloway noted, in surveying Canadian writers, that the prevailing sentiment was "a mixture of support for the writer, the desire to forcibly extract Ms. Kay and Ms. Clark's heads from their rectums, and shame that we are actually having to have a freedom of expression debate in 2015." Despite gay marriage being legal in Canada since 2005, J.B. Staniforth noted "the full-throated [gay] lust that the heterosexual majority takes for granted" was "still ... considered shocking."

Keeler rejected the petition to strip the award, noting that such efforts were akin to the jurors who deadlocked during the first trial of King's murderer.

The book along with five others were banned in Malaysia as a "preventative measure to stop the spread of ideologies and movements" that conflicted with the country's values.

== Awards and nominations ==
When Everything Feels Like the Movies received the Governor General's Award for English-language children's literature in 2014. Despite the Clark petition, the Canada Council backed the judges' award and refused to rescind the prize.

The novel, defended by Elaine Lui, was a runner up in the CBC Canada Reads competition in 2015.

It was also nominated for a Lambda Literary Award for LGBT Children’s/Young Adult Literature, and for Publishing Triangle’s Ferro-Grumley Award.

== Adaptations ==
Raziel Reid has adapted the novel into a screenplay; the movie option is held by Random Bench.

In 2020 the German edition was adapted for the stage by tjg. theater junge generation in Dresden, Germany.
