= Hit List (TV series) =

1991 Canadian music video program

- Also known as: YTV's Hit List
- Genre: Music
- Presented by: Danielle McGimsie; Rob Fournier; Exan Auyoung; Leslie Bosacki; Aashna Patel "Tarzan" Dan Freeman
- Country of origin: Canada
- Original language: English

Production
- Running time: 60 minutes
- Production company: GRC Productions

Original release
- Network: YTV
- Release: 6 June 1991 – 3 July 2005

The Hit List (aka Hit List or YTV's Hit List) is a music video television program that aired on YTV, a Canadian specialty television network aimed at children. The series first started in 1991, hosted by Tarzan Dan and had 14 seasons in all. The first 6 seasons of The Hit List were hosted by "Tarzan" Dan Freeman, while there were numerous hosts to follow from Aashna Patel, Leslie Bosacki and Exan Auyoung to Rob Fournier and Danielle McGimsie. As of fall 2005, The Hit List went on an indefinite hiatus. On the air, it was claimed it was due to the increase in more mature music videos that they are unable to show, naming "I'm a Slave 4 U" by Britney Spears, "Cry Me a River" by Justin Timberlake and "Dirrty" by Christina Aguilera as examples. The show was later cancelled.

At The Hit List's peak, two compilation CDs were released by YTV and MCA in 1994 and 1996, each featuring pop, R&B, rap, and dance songs aired on the show's countdown. The later Big Fun Party Mix compilation album series, which debuted in 2000 through Universal, can be seen as a spiritual successor to the Hit List CDs.

The celebrities include "Weird Al" Yankovic, Backstreet Boys, Christina Aguilera, *NSYNC, Take That, The Smashing Pumpkins, Spice Girls, Five, No Doubt, Britney Spears, Blur, Kim Stockwood, The Moffatts, Hanson, O-Town, Eiffel 65, Aaron Carter, Shawn Desman, Lillix, Simple Plan, Avril Lavigne, Busted, Rachel Stevens, Clay Aiken, Alanis Morissette (back when she was Alanis) and many others.

== Reception ==
Nanaimo Daily News television critic Sara Bennett said the program "is anchored by the anything-goes attitude of Tarzan Dan". Joel Rubinoff of the Kitchener-Waterloo Record wrote that host Danielle McGimsie's "charm is that the distance between her and her audience is virtually non-existent".
