= Liz Trinnear =

Canadian television personality

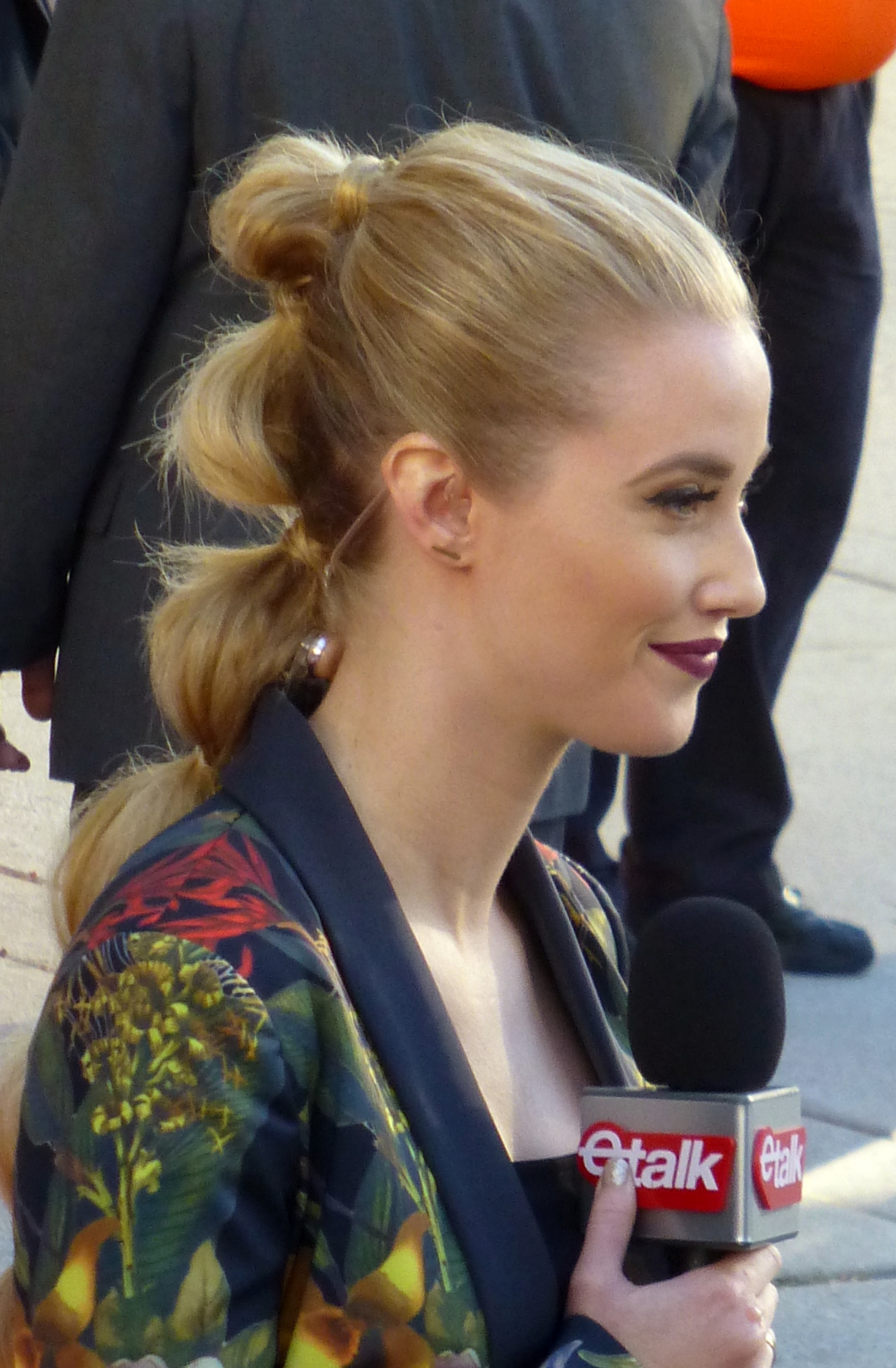
- Trinnear in 2014
- Born: London, Ontario, Canada
- Employer: Bell Media
- Known for: VJ Search winner (2009); MuchMusic VJ (2009–2015); etalk entertainment reporter (2015–present)
- Television: MuchOnDemand; New.Music.Live.; etalk
- Spouse: Nathaniel Motte (m. 2017)

Liz Trinnear is a Canadian television presenter, best known as a former VJ on MuchMusic and an entertainment reporter for eTalk.

Originally from London, Ontario, Trinnear joined MuchMusic after winning the 2009 edition of VJ Search. At MuchMusic, she co-hosted the channel's flagship programs MuchOnDemand and its successor New.Music.Live. until 2013. As the channel reduced its dependence on music programming in the 2010s, she began also working as an entertainment reporter for eTalk, although she remained in both roles for the first half of the decade and was co-host of the 2015 Much Music Video Awards with Tyrone Edwards and Ed Sheeran. When Much fully dropped music programming in the latter half of the decade, eTalk became her primary role.

Alongside Edwards, Traci Melchor, Elaine Lui, Chloe Wilde, Sonia Mangat and Priyanka, she was a Canadian Screen Award nominee for Best Host, Talk Show or Entertainment News at the 12th Canadian Screen Awards in 2024 for eTalk.

== Personal life ==
Trinnear married musician Nathaniel Motte of 3OH!3 in 2016.

She has also been public about her struggle with epidermolysis bullosa, a skin condition in which her skin blisters easily.
