= Leah Miller =

Canadian tv host, correspondent (b. 1981)

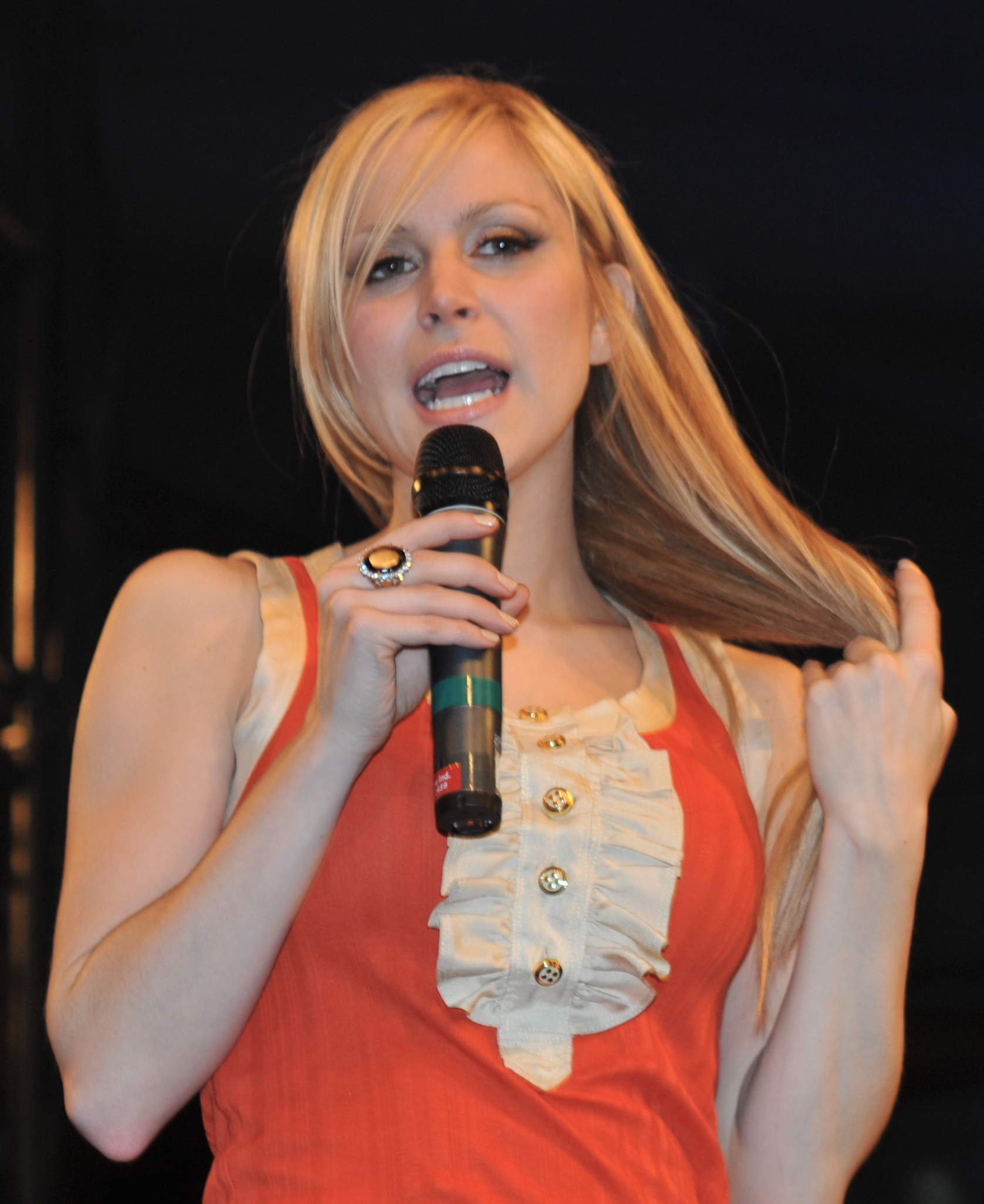
- Miller at the 2009 Juno Fanfare event
- Born: July 20, 1981 (age 45); Borough of York, Ontario
- Known for: Television host
- Spouse: Dallas Green (m. 2008)

Leah Miller (born July 20, 1981) is a Canadian television host and former MuchMusic VJ from Toronto, who was the host for the four seasons (2008–2011) of So You Think You Can Dance Canada. She was also a correspondent for the entertainment news show etalk, and E! in Canada.

== Early life ==
Miller is the youngest of four children; she has an older sister and two older brothers. Her parents are Peter Miller and Carla (née Parson) Miller. She won the title of Miss Junior Dance of Canada when she was 13 and danced on a competitive basis until age 16. After attending Cardinal Carter Academy for the Arts and Don Bosco Catholic Secondary School in Toronto, Ontario, Miller moved to Los Angeles to gain acting experience and worked on Ashton Kutcher's celebrity prank show Punk'd and in Chris Rock's movie Down to Earth. Missing her family, she moved back to Toronto after a few years.

== Career ==
=== MuchMusic ===
Miller was hired by MuchMusic as a VJ in November 2004 after trying out for four years. She hosted MuchMusic's flagship show "MuchOnDemand" for five years. She has hosted the Much Music Video Awards (MMVAS) and various Live at Much specials. Some of her notable interviews are Coldplay, Gwen Stefani, Halle Berry, Kanye West, Avril Lavigne, Rihanna, Matthew McConaughey, Fergie, Dallas Green, Alexisonfire, Pink, Lily Allen, Taylor Swift, Hilary Duff, Malin Åkerman, The Pussycat Dolls, Jason Segel and Paul Rudd. On August 31, 2009 Miller, along with all the other VJs, hosted her final MuchOnDemand episode. Perez Hilton, Hilary Duff and former VJ Matte Babel were included in the show.

=== So You Think You Can Dance Canada ===
In April 2008, it was announced that Miller would host So You Think You Can Dance Canada, which began broadcasting across Canada in September of that year. She received the 2009 Gemini Award for Best Performance or Host in a Variety Program or Series, and was also nominated in 2010.

=== etalk ===
In November 2009, Miller made her latest career move, becoming an entertainment correspondent for etalk.

In February 2010, Miller joined etalk hosts Tanya Kim and Ben Mulroney, along with fellow etalk reporters Elaine "Lainey" Lui, Susie Wall, and Jeanne Beker, in Vancouver to cover the 2010 Winter Olympics for CTV.

== Personal life ==
Miller began dating musician Dallas Green in 2006. The couple married in December 2008.

In November 2020, Miller opened Wolf & Moon, a lifestyle boutique, in Toronto's Rosedale neighbourhood. The shop has since closed down.
