= Raziel Reid =

Canadian writer (born 1990)

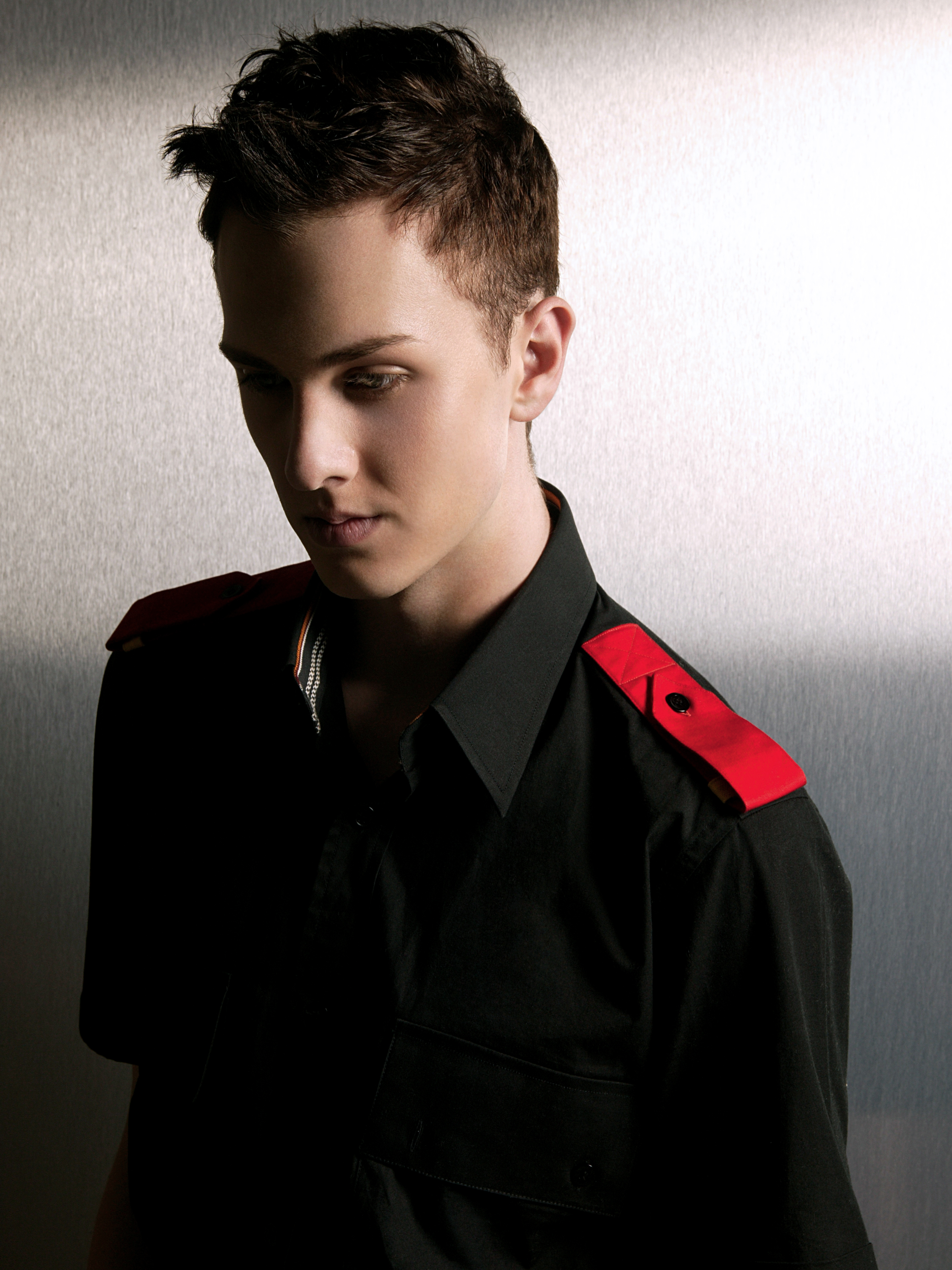
- Occupation: Writer
- Writing career
- Period: 2010s–present
- Notable work: When Everything Feels Like the Movies

Raziel Reid is a Canadian writer whose debut young adult novel When Everything Feels Like the Movies won the Governor General's Award for English-language children's literature at the 2014 Governor General's Awards. The novel, inspired in part by the 2008 murder of gay teenager Lawrence Fobes King, was published by Arsenal Pulp Press in 2014. Its launch was marked with a national book tour with Vivek Shraya, who was simultaneously promoting her new book She of the Mountains. In 2015, Reid became adjunct professor of Creative Writing for Children and Young Adults at the University of British Columbia.

Reid is a former blogger and columnist for Xtra Vancouver.

When Everything Feels Like the Movies was selected for inclusion in the 2015 edition of Canada Reads, where it was defended by blogger and broadcaster Elaine Lui. It was also nominated for a Lambda Literary Award for LGBT Children's/Young Adult Literature at the 27th Lambda Literary Awards, and for Publishing Triangle's Ferro-Grumley Award.

== Works ==
- When Everything Feels Like the Movies (2014, ISBN 9781551525747)
- Kens Penguin Random House Canada, Toronto 2018
- Followers Penguin Random House Canada, Toronto 2020
