= Sarah Taylor (personality) =

Canadian broadcaster

- Born: Sarah May Taylor; Hamilton, Ontario
- Known for: Television host

Sarah Taylor is a Canadian entertainment personality most noted for being a former VJ for Toronto-based television station MuchMusic from 2004 to 2010.

== Early life ==
Taylor is from Hamilton, Ontario, Canada and studied English and Women's Studies at McMaster University.

== Career ==
Taylor was discovered in the audience for the MuchMusic show MuchOnDemand in 2004, and was asked to be one of the VJs for the channel.

Taylor co-hosts many of MuchMusic's popular shows, including Combat Zone, and MuchTakeOver.

It was announced on February 16, 2007 on MuchMusic's website that Taylor underwent emergency surgery at a hospital in Las Vegas, Nevada on Thursday, February 15, 2007 to "relieve pressure on her brain". Tests revealed that the pressure was caused by her skull being fractured, which was caused by an accidental fall.

In 2009, Taylor was featured on the cover of Canadian Teen Girl Magazine's Technology Issue. It was also broadcast on Fashion Television.
