= Murder of Larry King =

Murder in Oxnard, California

Coordinates: 34°09′53″N 119°10′55″W

Lawrence King
- Born: Lawrence Fobes King; January 13, 1993; Ventura, California, U.S.
- Died: February 14, 2008 (aged 15); Oxnard, California, U.S.
- Cause of death: Gunshot wounds
- Resting place: Ivy Lawn Memorial Park, Ventura, California, U.S.
- Education: E.O. Green Junior High School
- Known for: Victim of hate crime
- Parent(s): Gregory King; Dawn King

Lawrence Fobes King, also known as Latisha King (Note: Some sources use the spelling Leticia.) (January 13, 1993 – February 14, 2008), was a 15-year-old student at E.O. Green Junior High School in Oxnard, California, who was shot twice by a fellow student, 14-year-old Brandon McInerney, and kept on life support for two days afterwards.

Newsweek described the shooting as "the most prominent gay-bias crime since the 1998 murder of Matthew Shepard", bringing attention to issues of gun violence as well as gender expression and sexual identity of teenagers.

Following many delays and a change of venue, McInerney's first trial began on July 5, 2011, in the Los Angeles district of Chatsworth. That trial ended on September 1, 2011, when Judge Charles Campbell declared a mistrial because the jury was unable to reach a unanimous verdict. Prosecutors decided to try McInerney again, but dropped the hate crime charge. On November 21, 2011, McInerney avoided the scheduled retrial by pleading guilty to second degree murder, voluntary manslaughter and use of a firearm. His plea resulted in a sentence of 21 years imprisonment.

== Involved parties ==
=== Lawrence King ===
Lawrence Fobes King was born on January 13, 1993 at the Ventura County Medical Center in Ventura, California, to a 15-year-old mother who was addicted to crack-cocaine and alcohol. King was half African-American. His biological father had abandoned his wife, and his mother, who was unable to care for King, resorted to prostitution to support her children and her drug habit. Two years later, King and his newborn brother were adopted by Gregory and Dawn King.

King was prescribed medication for ADHD and, according to Gregory King, had been diagnosed with reactive attachment disorder, a condition in which a child fails to develop relationships with his or her caregivers. He was also forced to repeat the first grade. By the third grade, King began to be bullied by his fellow students due to his effeminacy and openness about being gay, having come out at ten years old.

At the age of twelve, King was placed on probation for theft and vandalism, after taking food from the refrigerator in the home where he was living. In 2007, he was removed from his adoptive home and placed in a group home and treatment center named Casa Pacifica after he alleged that his adoptive father was physically abusing him, a charge Gregory King denied.

King found a marginally more accepting environment at E.O. Green Junior High School in the seventh grade. He hung out with a group of girls, but was still ridiculed by boys in his gym class. Boys openly bullied him when he began attending school wearing women's accessories and clothing, high heels and makeup. King's younger brother Rocky also suffered bullying because of his relationship with Larry.

Some teachers believed King's manner of dress to be distracting, and therefore a violation of school dress code. California anti-discrimination law prevents discrimination based on gender, including gender expression, so he was not prevented from dressing to his preference. In addition to dressing in feminine clothing, King had begun to ask to be called Latisha in the week and a half prior to the shooting.

The school issued a formal notice via email to every teacher on January 29, 2008. Written by eighth-grade assistant principal Sue Parsons, it said, in part:

We have a student on campus who has chosen to express his sexuality by wearing make-up. It is his right to do so. Some kids are finding it amusing, others are bothered by it. As long as it does not cause classroom disruptions he is within his rights. We are asking that you talk to your students about being civil and non-judgmental. They don't have to like it but they need to give him his space. We are also asking you to watch for possible problems. If you wish to talk further about it please see me or Joy Epstein.

In the months before the shooting, King began to respond in kind to sustained harassment from his peers. He would tell boys in the locker room that they looked attractive, according to a classmate's mother, or ask if he could sit at the popular boy's table in the cafeteria. Some boys reported to a teacher that he would tell them, "I know you want me," in the halls between classes. In court documents, prosecutors described these behaviors as a response to increasing aggression from other boys, particularly Brandon McInerney, with whom King had had a number of "acrimonious" verbal disputes in the weeks prior to the shooting.

=== Brandon McInerney ===
Brandon David McInerney was born on January 24, 1994, in Ventura, California. His mother, Kendra, had a criminal history and was addicted to methamphetamine. In 1993, Kendra accused her husband William of shooting her in the arm with a .45-caliber pistol. In another incident, William McInerney choked his wife almost to unconsciousness after she accused him of stealing ADHD medication from her older son. He pleaded no contest and served ten days in jail and 36 months probation on a charge of domestic violence. Between August 2000 and February 2001, William McInerney had contacted Child Protective Services at least five times to express concern about his son living with his mother. In 2001, he filed a restraining order against Kendra, and in 2004, Brandon was placed in the custody of his father, as his mother had entered a drug rehabilitation program.

== The shooting ==
In July 2008, Newsweek reported that a day or two before the shooting, King walked onto the basketball court in the middle of a game and asked McInerney to be his Valentine in front of the team members, who then made fun of McInerney. Later that day King was seen walking back and forth in high-heeled boots and makeup in front of McInerney. According to a teacher, a group of boys were laughing at McInerney who was getting visibly upset and assistant principal Joy Epstein, noticing McInerney's reaction, wagged her finger at him. When McInerney endured teasing because of the incident, he attempted to recruit other students to assault King but no one expressed interest. He then told one of King's friends to say goodbye to him "because she would never see [King] again".

On the morning of February 12, 2008, McInerney was witnessed repeatedly looking at King during a class in a computer laboratory. At approximately 8:15 a.m. local time, McInerney drew from his backpack a .22-caliber revolver belonging to relatives and shot King twice in the back of the head. Following the shooting, McInerney tossed the handgun on the floor and walked out of the classroom. He was apprehended by police five blocks away from the school campus about seven minutes later.

King was transported to St. John's Regional Medical Center where he was listed in serious condition. He was declared brain dead on February 13 but kept on life support for two days so that his organs could be donated.

== Response ==
Vigils and marches were organized across the United States following King's death. Condolences were expressed by, among many others, Judy Shepard, Human Rights Campaign president Joe Solmonese, Senator Hillary Clinton, and television host Ellen DeGeneres. A thousand students in the Hueneme School District, where E.O. Green is located, marched to pay tribute to King on February 16, 2008, four days after the shooting.

A new diversity education bill was introduced on behalf of King by California Assemblyperson Mike Eng, saying, "We need to teach young people that there's a curriculum called tolerance education that should be in every school. We should teach young people that diversity is not something to be assaulted, but diversity is something that needs to be embraced because diversity makes California the great state that it is." The bill would require mandatory classes on diversity and tolerance in California school districts.

A local vigil in Ventura, California, was organized one year after King's death. The Day of Silence for 2008, which is intended to protest LGBT harassment and occurred on April 25, was specially dedicated to King. King's father, Greg, was reportedly unconvinced his adoptive son was gay, as Larry had only recently told him that he was actually bisexual. Greg believes that Larry was sexually harassing McInerney, and has expressed concern that King is being made a poster child for gay rights issues.

Some teachers also showed some sympathy for McInerney, with one stating, "We failed Brandon. We didn't know the bullying was coming from the other side—Larry was pushing as hard as he could, because he liked the attention." Hundreds of students from the school signed a petition requesting that McInerney be tried as a juvenile.

== Criticism of the school ==
In August 2008, King's family filed a claim against E.O. Green Junior High School at Ventura County Superior Court, alleging that the school's allowing King to wear makeup and feminine clothing was a factor leading to his death. According to the California Attorney General's Office, however, the school could not legally have stopped King from wearing girls' clothes because state law prevents gender discrimination.

According to a Newsweek article published on July 19, 2008, some teachers at E.O. Green alleged that assistant principal Joy Epstein, herself openly gay, was "encouraging King's flamboyance to help further an 'agenda' ". When Epstein was later promoted to principal at another local public school, King's father described it as a "slap in the face of my family". The superintendent, Jerry Dannenberg, stated that Epstein received the promotion because "she was the most qualified person for the new principal job".

== Pretrial legal proceedings ==
In February 2008, McInerney's lawyer, William Quest, was considering asking for a change of venue. On July 24, 2008, Judge Douglas Daily of Ventura County Superior Court ruled that McInerney would stand trial as an adult, with the decision being appealed. On August 7, 2008, in the same court, McInerney pleaded not guilty to premeditated murder and a hate crime. A preliminary hearing was set for September 23, 2008, which had been rescheduled for October 14, 2008.

On September 23, 2008, the court appointed Willard Wiksell, a lawyer from Ventura, guardian ad litem for McInerney. Previously, McInerney's family took steps to fire his lawyer, William Quest, of the Public Defenders Office and hire the United Defense Group, a criminal defense law firm from Los Angeles. However, the Public Defenders Office filed a petition stating that the United Defense Group might not have McInerney's best interests in mind.

On October 14, 2008, after the court received a report from the appointed guardian ad litem and determined that the defendant had not been coerced into changing representation and knew what he was doing, the Ventura County Superior Court allowed McInerney to fire his Public Defender, William Quest, and the Public Defenders Office, and hire the United Defense Group together with attorney Robyn Bramson as his attorneys. The court also denied a motion to gag the defendant's former representatives from the Public Defenders Office from speaking about the case, especially to the media.

On December 8, 2008, Ventura County Superior Court ruled that McInerney, after being evaluated by a psychiatrist and a psychologist, was competent to stand trial. That same day, Scott S. Wippert, of the United Defense Group, filed a legal motion for discovery, asking the court to order the district attorney to provide documents to uncover whether prosecutors exercised discretion in sending McInerney's case to the adult court system. On December 29, 2008, Judge Rebecca Riley denied the motion, on the grounds that there was no evidence of abuse of discretion in transferring McInerney from juvenile to adult court.

On January 26, 2009, the preliminary hearing was postponed until March 17, to give McInerney's lawyers time to appeal Judge Riley's rejection of the December motion for discovery. On March 18, 2009, the hearing was again postponed, when William McInerney, the father of Brandon, was found dead in his living room in the Silver Strand area near Oxnard after he sustained an accidental head injury in a fall. Judge Riley granted Brandon McInerney permission to leave the juvenile detention facility and attend his father's funeral.

On August 27, 2009, at his arraignment in Ventura County Superior Court, McInerney pleaded not guilty to all charges. The judge, Bruce Young, set the pretrial hearing date for October 23, 2009, and a trial start date for December 1, 2009.

On September 1, 2009, Ventura County Superior Court Judge Kevin DeNoce ruled that the addition of a lying-in-wait allegation to the list of charges was acceptable. The addition of this allegation would automatically mean that the case must be heard in an adult court. The addition was petitioned, and in November the Ventura 2nd District Appellate Court denied the request to overturn the earlier ruling, finding that the District Attorney's Office did not act vindictively in adding the lying-in-wait allegation to the murder charge.

On January 21, 2010, the State Supreme Court rejected the petition to overturn the earlier ruling by the Ventura County Superior Court judge.

After a postponement from May 14, 2010, McInerney's trial was set to begin on July 14, 2010, in Ventura County Superior Court, but was again postponed. A hearing was scheduled for April 4, 2011, to determine whether McInerney's attorneys would be ready for a trial starting May 2. Previous postponements followed motions from defense attorneys requesting recusal of the district attorney, a change of venue, and more time for fact-finding. In August 2010, Ventura County Superior Court Judge Charles Campbell ruled that the trial would proceed in Ventura County with jurors selected from Santa Barbara County. On December 6, 2010, Campbell denied the motion for recusal.

A California appeals court affirmed on May 5, 2011, that the juvenile records of King will remain sealed after a lower court refused the request of the McInerney defense team for the release of said records.

After multiple delays, the trial began on July 5, 2011, with a change of venue to Chatsworth, Los Angeles. Multiple previously scheduled dates were bypassed for various reasons, and plans or requests to move the venue or use jurors from other locations in California were not realized.

== Trial ==
=== First trial ===
On the first day of trial, James Bing, McInerney's half-brother, was admonished by Judge Campbell because it was overheard that Bing went to the jury outside of the courtroom and addressed them. He said: "The fate of my brother is in your hands." Bing was then banned from the courtroom unless he was summoned to testify. The prosecutor depicted McInerney as a popular teenager, who was skilled in martial arts and firing guns as well as being a white supremacist. She went on to describe King as a small guy who had often been picked on, saying that King wore high-heeled boots, makeup and jewelry along with his school uniform to school. Scott Wippert, McInerney's attorney, described King as the aggressor, saying he often was sexually aggressive and often made inappropriate remarks, provoking McInerney.

Witnesses who were students and classmates of McInerney testified on July 7, 2011. One witness said that King told her he had changed his name to Leticia. Another witness said many students made fun of King and called him offensive names behind his back when he came to school wearing makeup and jewelry. A few of the witnesses said that they never noticed King making sexual advances toward other students but that sexual comments he made were "just messing" with McInerney.

The former vice principal of E.O. Green School, Joy Epstein, testified on July 11, 2011. She said she had discussed King's behavior with other school officials of the school district and they decided it was, according to the constitutional rights of California, legitimate for King to wear what he wanted unless it violated the school dress code. Joy Epstein said high-heeled boots, makeup and jewelry were all allowed according to the Oxnard school dress policy. She said another administrator within the district said that the school must protect the students' civil and equal rights. Another teacher testified that pupils had told her King would seek them out and follow them into the bathroom, behavior she considered to be sexual harassment. She was told by Epstein the school could do nothing about the behavior.

On July 22, 2011, the jury was shown footage of a video in which McInerney was fighting in the Ventura County Juvenile hall, where he currently lives. One of the corrections officers, testified that the defendant was a "good kid" in the honors program for good behavior and had relationships with people of different backgrounds and origins. He said that within the juvenile hall environment fighting was a routine occurrence and that McInerney was not prone to violence as the prosecution alleged.

Dawn Boldrin, an English teacher, had testified and said she counseled King and told him he should not wear attention-getting clothing if he did not want to receive negative attention. She also gave the teen, who was exploring his sexual and/or gender identity, a strapless, green, chiffon gown. She meant for him to wear it outside school. A photo was shown of Larry King holding up the dress and many people in the courtroom were crying. Greg King, Larry's father became upset and gathered his family to leave, but before doing so, Dawn King, Larry's mother, swore at Boldrin's 13-year-old daughter and a relative. The judge later barred Dawn King from the remainder of the trial. Because the school administrators were allowing King to wear whatever he wanted as long as it did not violate the dress code, the defense was arguing that this allowed King to sexually harass McInerney.

The trial ended without a verdict and was declared a mistrial by the judge, Ventura County Superior Court Judge Charles Campbell, on Thursday, September 1, 2011, after the jury reported that they were hopelessly deadlocked and unable to reach a unanimous verdict. There were eight weeks of testimony with almost 100 witnesses, and the jury had been deliberating since August 26, 2011. The jury had taken four votes and the last vote was split between seven jurors voting for voluntary manslaughter and five jurors voting for either first-degree or second-degree murder. Later analysis showed defense attorneys had chosen to pursue the gay panic defense strategy, with several jurors later stating on the television program 20/20 that King had been bullying McInerney, leaving McInerney with "no way out".

=== Second trial ===
On September 2, 2011, the district attorney's office announced that they intended to retry McInerney, and a hearing was scheduled for October 5, 2011. For the second trial, the prosecutors dropped the hate crime charge.

On November 21, 2011, McInerney pleaded guilty to second-degree murder, voluntary manslaughter and use of a firearm. He was sentenced to 21 years in prison, initially in a juvenile facility and then in prison upon turning 18, with no credit given for time served prior to the trial or for good behavior. He was sentenced on December 19. As of July 2025, McInerney is in the Kern County Male Community Reentry Program.

== In popular culture ==
Many celebrities commented on the murder of Lawrence King. Some, like Janet Jackson, Calpernia Adams, Sara Bareilles, and Taylor Swift, used their fame and recognition to create a public service announcement about the murder which ran on Logo and across MTV networks. Victim of police brutality Rodney King compared the murder to his own experience as a victim of hate crime stating, "What have we learned? What have we changed?"

An examination of the circumstances that preceded and followed the 2008 murder was captured in the 2013 HBO documentary film, Valentine Road.

The murder was a central inspiration for Canadian writer Raziel Reid's award-winning young adult novel When Everything Feels Like the Movies, published in 2014, and Simon Boulerice's novel L'enfant mascara, published in 2016.

A book by clinical psychologist Ken Corbett, A Murder Over a Girl, was published in March 2016 circling around the tragedy and how bullying, homophobia and transphobia caused the murder of Larry King. The book also goes into the detail about the personal lives of Larry King, Brandon McInerney, and those close to the boys while also talking about how the trials went during that time.

E.O. Green Junior High School installed an alliance called Prism, a safe space for LGBTQ youth and allies, years after the death of Larry King.

The podcast Criminal covered the murder of Larry King in their episode, "Panic Defense", about the gay panic defense.

== See also ==
- Violence against LGBT people
- Bullying
- Murder of Scott Amedure
- Northern Illinois University shooting, which occurred on the same day as Larry King succumbing to his wounds
- List of school shooting in the United States by death toll
