= Tanya Kim =

Canadian television host

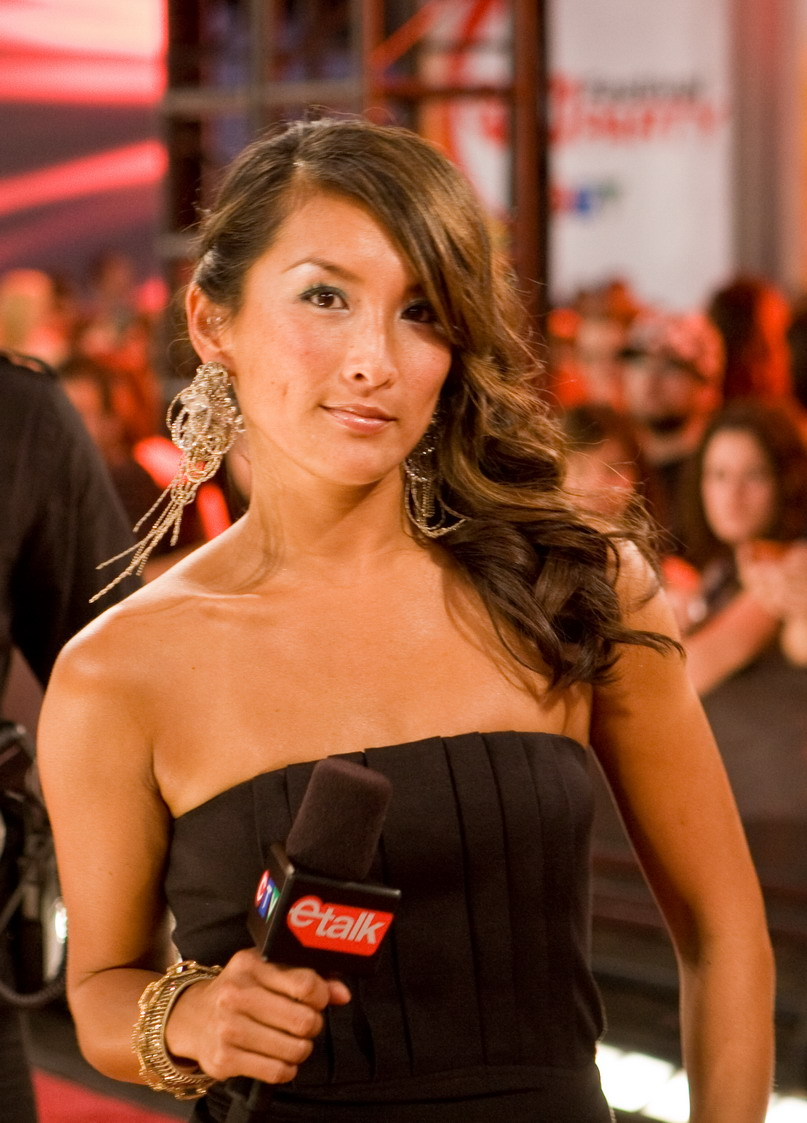
- Kim in 2008
- Born: Sault Ste. Marie, Ontario, Canada
- Education: Ryerson Polytechnic University
- Occupation: Television host

Tanya Kim is a Canadian television personality, best known as the co-host of etalk from 2003 to 2014.

== Early life ==
Kim was born and raised in Sault Ste. Marie, Ontario to Korean immigrant parents. Her grandmother moved from Seoul to Canada to raise Kim and her older brother, Richard. She studied classical piano and dance, and attended Sherry Walsh Academy of Dance Arts and Davey Dance Company in Sault Ste. Marie. Kim graduated from Sir James Dunn Collegiate and Vocational School and attended Ryerson Polytechnic University, graduating from the journalism program, specializing in broadcasting. While at Ryerson, she volunteered at campus station CKLN-FM as an announcer and voice over artist, and worked as an intern at MuchMusic.

== Career ==
After graduating, she worked as a videographer at MuchMusic before joining CTV's The Chatroom as a music reporter and becoming special correspondent for Canadian Idol for two seasons. In 2003, she joined etalk, co-hosting the show with Ben Mulroney.

On etalk, Kim has worked red carpets at the Juno Awards and the Academy Awards, and covered special events like Live 8 and Live Earth. In 2009, Kim hosted We Day, in support of Free The Children, for the third year in a row.

Kim also hosted etalk Playlist in 2005, a six-episode chart show/concert mini-series that expanded on etalk's Playlist segment. The series was broadcast before a studio audience from the Masonic Temple concert hall. The 30-minute shows included live studio performances, interviews, news and chart reviews.

In February 2010, Kim joined etalk host Ben Mulroney along with etalk reporters Leah Miller, Elaine Lui, Susie Wall and Jeanne Beker in Vancouver to cover the 2010 Olympic Winter Games for CTV. In November 2014, she was laid off by Bell Media, which runs CTV.

In 2015 Kim returned to CityTV as host of Entertainment City and Your World This Week. Kim's departure from City was announced in August 2017.

Aside from her work on etalk, Kim has appeared in Puppets Who Kill, Degrassi: The Next Generation, Instant Star, and the film Glitter starring Mariah Carey.

== Charity work ==
In November 2008 Tanya Kim announced a partnership with CARE Canada, a major humanitarian and international development charitable organization, to promote CARE Canada's I Am Powerful women's empowerment campaign. She travelled to Zambia to generate awareness and gain first-hand knowledge of the strength and resiliency of women in the developing world.
