= Chloe Wilde =

Canadian television personality

Chloe Wilde is a Canadian television presenter, best known as a former VJ on MuchMusic and an entertainment reporter for eTalk.

She joined MuchMusic after winning the 2013 edition of VJ Search. When the channel reduced its dependence on music programming in 2014, she added duties as an entertainment reporter for sister station E! Canada before joining eTalk in 2016.

In 2018 she launched Healthy Is Hot, a lifestyle blog and podcast devoted to discussion of women's health topics.

In 2020 and 2021, she was co-host with her eTalk colleague Tyrone Edwards of the TIFF Tribute Awards, which were presented in both years as a television special rather than a theatrical gala due to the COVID-19 pandemic. She has also had small appearances as a reporter in the television series Man Seeking Woman, Private Eyes and The Boys.

With Jus Reign and Jillea, she received a Canadian Screen Award nomination for Best Host in a Variety or Reality Competition Program or Series at the 5th Canadian Screen Awards in 2017, for their work as co-hosts of the 2016 iHeartRadio MuchMusic Video Awards. Alongside Edwards, Traci Melchor, Elaine Lui, Liz Trinnear, Sonia Mangat and Priyanka, she was a nominee for Best Host, Talk Show or Entertainment News at the 12th Canadian Screen Awards in 2024 for eTalk.

== Personal life ==
Prior to her career as a television host, Wilde was studying to be a nurse at McGill University, hosting video clips for the website AskMen and modelling for Canadian brands including Laura part-time.

She is engaged to artist Ben Johnston. In October 2023, she gave birth to the couple's first child, Grey Alexander Johnston.
