= MuchTopTens =

MuchTopTens was a two-hour-long television program. It was aired on Thursdays at 7:00 PM ET on MuchMusic, a Canadian television station. It was initially hosted by MuchMusic VJ (Rick Campanelli, later Amanda Walsh, and most recently Devon Soltendieck.

During the show, a playlist of ten music videos that all share a common music video concept were played. Other videos related to the episode's theme and videos that "didn't make the cut" were also shown. The show normally included the top ten videos as well as 10 extra videos. The show ended with a revision of the top ten video list.
