= David Giammarco =

Canadian actor

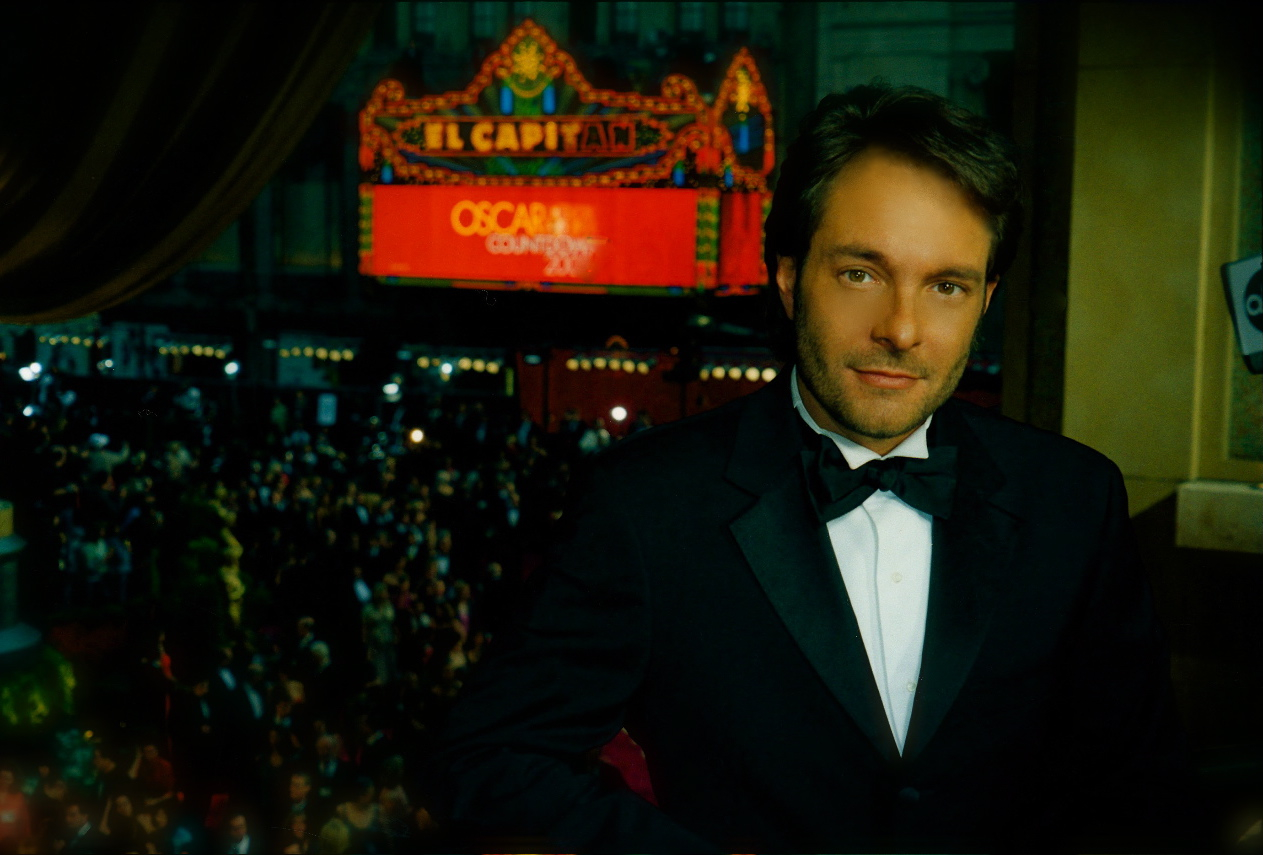
- David Giammarco attends the 2006 Academy Awards Ceremony at the Kodak Theatre, Hollywood, California
- Born: David Michael Giammarco; Toronto, Ontario, Canada
- Occupations: Actor, Television Host, Journalist, Author
- Website: www.davidgiammarco.com

David Michael Giammarco is a Canadian-born television personality, actor, journalist, and author of the book For Your Eyes Only: Behind the Scenes of the James Bond Films.

== Background ==
David Giammarco was born in Toronto, spent his summers in California, and attended school in Canada. He studied drama and filmmaking at York University and started as an entertainment reporter at 14 years old, writing celebrity feature interviews for The Toronto Sun and hosting a radio show.

== Journalist and author ==
Giammarco has written for American magazines and newspapers including Playboy, Hello!, The Times, The Sunday Telegraph and The Hollywood Reporter. In 2002, he wrote the book For Your Eyes Only: Behind The Scenes of the James Bond Films, an account of James Bond. His investigation and reporting on the secret history of the Cold War be included in the historical collection of U.S. Record at the National Archives in Washington.

Giammarco wrote the James Bond edition of the November/December 2008 issue of Cigar Aficionado, featuring interviews with Daniel Craig and producers Barbara Broccoli and Michael G. Wilson. It became the magazine's biggest-selling issue.

== Television and film ==
In 1998, David Giammarco wrote, directed, and starred in the spoof Twi-Lite Zone: The Last Episode for The Comedy Network, and in 1999 wrote, directed, and starred in the satire DMG, which also featured cameo performances from Dan Aykroyd, Leslie Nielsen, Martin Short, Don Rickles, and G. Gordon Liddy.

In 2003, David Giammarco joined the TV show eTalk Daily as Senior Entertainment Reporter and Host, broadcast nationally on CTV, MTV e2 and MTV Screen. Giammarco brought to eTalk celebrity interviews, with his Hollywood coverage also including national news channel CTV NewsNet as well as CTV morning show Canada AM.

In 2004, Giammarco appeared in Freddy vs. Jason for New Line Cinema, as well as the romantic baseball comedy The Pitcher and the Pin-Up for Universal. Giammarco was in the 2008 political comedy Swing Vote, where he appeared alongside Kevin Costner, Kelsey Grammer, Dennis Hopper, and Nathan Lane. The film, produced by Kevin Costner, was shot on location in New Mexico and released by Touchstone Pictures. Later that year, Giammarco featured in the Ian Fleming docudrama True Bond, which was broadcast worldwide and coincided with the release of the 22nd James Bond film Quantum of Solace.

In 2005, Giammarco was invited on a world tour by Tom Cruise and director Steven Spielberg for War of the Worlds. In 2006, Tom Cruise and Giammarco, along with director J. J. Abrams, repeated a similar flight plan around the globe for the world tour of Mission: Impossible III.
