= Mike & Mike's Excellent X-Canada Adventures =

Canadian television series

Mike & Mike's Excellent X-Canada Adventures is a Canadian television show, which aired on MuchMusic. Hosted by Mike Campbell and Mike Rhodes, the series was a travelogue in which the hosts travelled to a different Canadian town or city in each episode, profiling interesting people and local events and attractions.

It premiered in 1989 as an expansion of shorter segments that the duo had previously produced for Rockflash. It was cancelled in 1994, with Rhodes leaving MuchMusic while Campbell remained with the network in other capacities, including as host of the later Going Coastal, until leaving in 2002.
