= Totally Untrue History Of... =

"Totally Untrue History Of..." is a series by MuchMusic that presents a mockumentary of a celebrity each episode.

So far, the celebrities that have been mocked, in no order, are Jessica Simpson, Eminem, Hilary Duff, 50 Cent, Paris Hilton, Britney Spears, Beyoncé, Kanye West, Justin Timberlake, Fergie, Christina Aguilera, Fall Out Boy, Rihanna, Jay-Z, Lindsay Lohan, and Kelly Clarkson.
