= Jesse Giddings =

Canadian musician

- Born: Langley, British Columbia, Canada
- Spouse: Hannah Simone (m. 2016)
- Children: 1

Jesse Giddings is a Canadian television host, producer, musician, actor, former exotic dancer, artist and photographer born in Langley, British Columbia and went to high school at Langley Secondary School. He was formerly a VJ starting in 2009 at MuchMusic, a music television station in Canada and later a host on E! News in Los Angeles.

== Early life and career ==
Giddings studied at Langley Secondary School but left shortly after graduating. He then moved to San Clemente, California before settling in Sacramento, California for a while. Later, Giddings moved back to Langley, British Columbia and started The Basement Venue promoting, emceeing and hosting All-Age concerts. This led Giddings to join Swingset Champion and where he met Sherwood who he later did a North American tour with The Academy Is..., Armor For Sleep, Cobra Starship, and The Rocket Summer. This led him to join We Shot The Moon for a brief stint. After touring Giddings moved to Calgary where he worked for Lakota drilling as a roughneck before jumping to Toronto to pursue a job at MuchMusic. He got back into modeling while waiting through the nine-month audition process at MuchMusic. He caught the attention of the station's producers in an open casting call where he beat out thousands for the coveted position. He started his VJ job at MuchMusic on 20 October 2009. He co-hosted regularly on MuchMusic's flagship show New.Music.Live. and when it was formerly known as MuchOnDemand. Giddings co-hosted the 2012 MuchMusic Video Awards with LMFAO and in 2011 with Selena Gomez.

As a musician, Giddings has played with indie bands such as Swingset Champion and We Shot the Moon. Giddings finished his upcoming solo album with producer Gavin Brown (Metric, Billy Talent, Three Days Grace) which he has yet to release.

Giddings co-hosted Pepsi pre-show for the second season of The X Factor and Pepsi.com websites.

Giddings is a big supporter of Free The Children and has hosted more than 15 We Day events across Canada alongside personalities such as Joe Jonas and Nina Dobrev and speakers that include Martin Sheen, Al Gore, Mikhael Gorbachev, Magic Johnson, the Dalai Lama, Archbishop Desmond Tutu, Larry King, Richard Branson and Mia Farrow to name a few. Giddings's dedication took him to Kenya to assist in the hands-on building of a school for local children there.

On 7 August 2013, Giddings was named a correspondent on E! News.

== Personal life ==
Giddings married actress Hannah Simone, who is also a former VJ at MuchMusic, in 2016. They announced that they were expecting their first child together, whom they welcomed in August 2017.
