= MuchOnDemand =

Canadian television series

- MuchOnDemand Titlecard
- Starring: Tim Deegan; Devon Soltendieck; Sarah Taylor; Jesse Giddings
- Country of origin: Canada

Production
- Running time: 60 minutes

Original release
- Network: MuchMusic
- Release: 1997 – 2010

Related
- New.Music.Live.

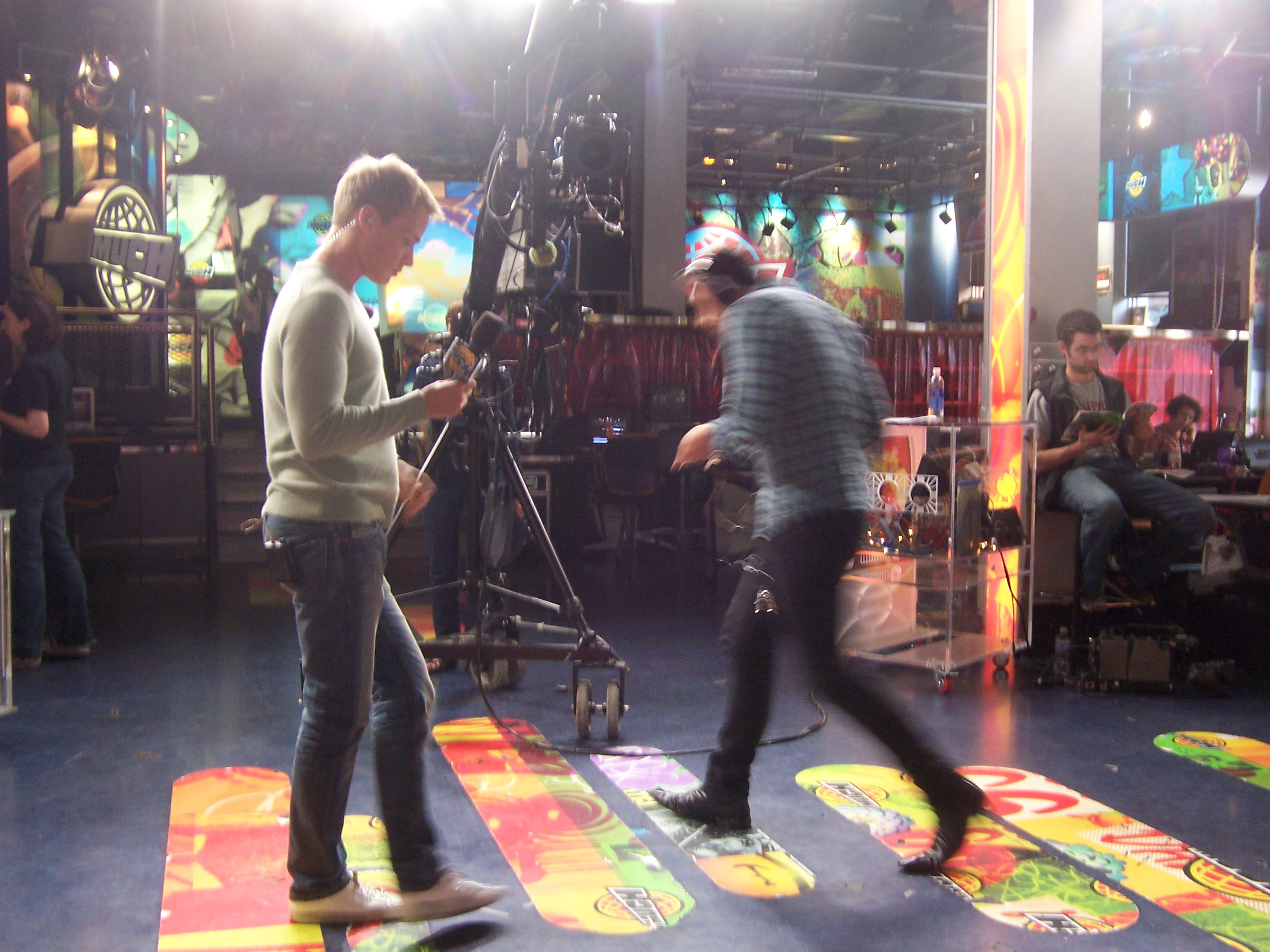
MuchOnDemand view from the in-studio audience, with Devon Soltendieck

MuchOnDemand (also called MOD) is an hour-long per broadcast viewer interactive television program aired on MuchMusic, Monday through Friday at 5pm ET. It was broadcast live from 299 Queen Street West in Toronto, Ontario. The Best of MuchOnDemand, aired Sundays at 10am ET, highlighting the best moments on the show from the past week. MuchOnDemand acted as MuchMusic's flagship show in a similar manner as MTV's U.S. music video countdown show Total Request Live.

== History ==
MuchOnDemand first aired with VJ host Rick Campanelli, mainly with a format where people can request videos. When it changed its format in 2002, it added Jennifer Hollett as co-host. Since its debut, the show has been hosted by several other personalities, including Amanda Walsh (who replaced Jennifer Hollett), Sarah Taylor and Devon Soltendieck and Matte Babel and Leah Miller since 2004. In 2006, Tim Deegan began co-hosting regularly.

The usual hosts until the show's end were Sarah Taylor, Devon Soltendieck, Jesse Giddings, Tim Deegan and Liz Trinnear.

Leah Miller, host on the show, had her last day on Monday, August 31, 2009, where she left MuchOnDemand to move to Los Angeles and become regular host of So You Think You Can Dance Canada.

June 18, 2010, the Friday prior to the MuchMusic Video Awards, was apparently the last day for MuchOnDemand to be aired, since no mention was ever made on the show that the show was going away. In MOD's time slot come Monday was simply an hour of music videos, there was no post-MMVA coverage, and MuchOnDemand had vanished. CTVglobemedia had apparently started some massive renovations to the 299 Queen Street West building, rumoured to equip CTV/Much with HD capabilities, which prevented all VJ-hosted show, including VideoFlow and MuchNews, from being produced, and that the studio would be ready to go again in December. These renovations also changed the face of CTV's entertainment newsmagazine, etalk, as their studio was a close neighbour to the Much studio. But while etalk lost their studio too, they were able to relocate their on-air locale to their newsroom, as the whole Queen Street building is wired as an on-air studio.

On August 23, 2010, Sarah Taylor confirmed via her Twitter account that MuchOnDemand was not coming back and that a "new show is on it's [sic] way". On December 13, 2010, New.Music.Live., the successor to MOD, premiered at its regular timeslot.
