= Devon Soltendieck =

Canadian VJ

- Born: 8 May 1985 (age 41); Montreal, Quebec
- Known for: Television reporter
- Spouse: Ashley Applebaum (m. 2015)
- Children: 2

Devon Soltendieck is a Canadian television entertainment reporter. He has been a MuchMusic VJ, and from early 2010 until January 2013 an anchor and reporter on CP24.

== Early life ==
Soltendieck attended a summer school for two months in Villars, Switzerland. He returned to Canada to finish high school and graduated from Selwyn House School in Westmount, Quebec, then from Dawson College CEGEP. While a student at Dawson, Soltendieck helped run the school newspaper. Before he was hired by MuchMusic, Soltendieck was a student of Economics and Political Science at Concordia University and continued his education in Finance at the University of Toronto thereafter. Soltendieck is a professionally trained violinist and horn player and has taught himself to play guitar and percussion. He is fluently bilingual in English and French.

== Career ==
Soltendieck's career began in 2004, when he won MuchMusic's VJ Search competition at the age of 18. He was first awarded a three-month contract and went on to work for the station for six years. As a VJ, Soltendieck was part of the MuchNews team, interviewing numerous celebrities and covering current events. Soltendieck also briefly appeared in the movie Fantastic Four, as a MuchMusic reporter. He was voted one of TV Guide's "Top 10 Stars on the Verge of a Major Breakout" in March 2005.

Soltendieck left Muchmusic in 2010 and joined the news team at CP24 as an anchor and remote host. He ended his run in 2013. He first appeared on Etalk on August 21, 2013 and worked there unter until November 22, 2018. Starting November 2013, Soltendieck also hosted a short-lived game show Pop Quiz on the E! Canada entertainment network. Since 2018 he has been working in the advertising industry, first at Terms & Conditions Creative, then at SaltXC, both Toronto-based agencies.
