= MuchMusic Brasil =

Brazilian over-the-air television network (2000–2001)

MuchMusic Brasil was a Brazilian cable television network and a Brazilian version of the Canadian music network MuchMusic. Launched in 2001 as a terrestrial network, it had a hard time competing with MTV Brasil and in December 2001 the network ceased production, and went off the air.

Ahead of launching, MuchMusic negotiated with potential partners, to circumvent Brazilian licensing regulations that forbid foreign ownership of television stations. On the cards were Rádio Transatlântica, owner of TV Exclusiva (Curitiba) and CBI, channel 16 in São Paulo. Initially its lineup relayed that of the Latin American feed available on DirecTV, but would gradually introduce local content and presenters.

The network launched on May 4, 2001 in Rio de Janeiro on UHF channels 44 and 49, with the channel schedule to launch in São Paulo by year-end 2001.

MuchMusic was later (until 2024) available in several other South American countries, but as a Spanish focused format of MuchMusic Latin America. There is no Portuguese programming on MuchMusic Latin America.
