= Tim Deegan =

Canadian VJ

Tim Deegan (born in Oshawa, Ontario) is a Canadian former VJ on MuchMusic, a music television station in Canada.

== Early life ==
Tim grew up in Oshawa east of Toronto and he attended O'Neill Collegiate and Vocational Institute, and had a part-time job at a grocery store. Tim joined a band during high school, which played handfuls of shows over southern Ontario during their high school years. After high school, Tim went to Durham College to study firefighting. After graduating from the firefighting program, Tim worked as a Fire Protection Officer at an automotive factory before deciding to go back to school for woodworking. He moved to Kitchener and attended Conestoga College.

== MuchMusic ==
Tim auditioned for the MuchMusic VJ Search at Fairview Park Mall in Kitchener, Ontario and eventually won the competition months later, by public vote.

In his time as a MuchMusic VJ, Tim hosted numerous shows including Much On Demand, Much Adrenaline, Much Take Over, On Set, The Shift and My Date With, as well as hosting specials like Buck Naked in Barbados, Spring Break, Hot N Wet, and the Much Music Video Awards. Tim has interviewed such bands/stars as the Jonas Brothers, Justin Bieber, Hedley, Melanie C (Spice Girls), The All American Rejects, Kesha, Katy Perry, Timbaland, Jerry Seinfeld, Sean "Diddy" Combs, 3OH!3, Boys Like Girls, and Amanda Crew. Deegan filmed his last shift at MuchMusic on September 2, 2010.
