= Star! Daily =

Canadian television series

Star! Daily is a Canadian half-hour daily entertainment television series that aired on the CHUM Limited networks Star!, A-Channel and Citytv. The show was hosted by Dina Pugliese and Husein Madhavji along with entertainment reporters Larysa Harapyn, Liz West, Danielle McGimsie and Sean Gehon.

Following the acquisition of Star! and A-Channel by CTVglobemedia, Star! Daily was discontinued on October 11, 2007, and 22 members of its production staff were laid off. It was replaced on both networks by CTV's own entertainment news program, etalk, which CTVglobemedia staff considered to be a more successful program.
