= Combat Zone (TV series) =

Combat Zone (formerly known as Combat des Clips) was a music video program on Canadian music TV station MuchMusic featuring viewer voting. It was hosted from 1991 to 1997 by Craig F. Halket. The show involved two popular music videos playing the roles of the combatants. During the hour-long program, viewers could either call in, fax or email their votes for one of the two competing songs. A separate French edition of the program, also titled Combat des clips, aired on MusiquePlus.

During the progress of the show, various other videos of similar genres as the two competing songs are shown, as well as trivia about the champion and challenger along with other songs by those musicians.

By the end of the program, the song with the most votes becomes the champion and is played. In the subsequent weeks, for however long that song continually gets voted champion (maximum five weeks), it faces new challengers. After five weeks as a champion, the song gets placed in the Combat Zone Hall of Fame.

In 1997, MuchMusic launched "Combat des clips" as an interactive competition on its website, inviting PC users to download audio recordings of independent bands and voting for their favourites weekly.

== Hall of Fame ==
Previously, there was no limit on how long a song could reign as champion but after 13 straight victories, I Mother Earth's One More Astronaut was retired and made the first song in the new Combat Zone Hall of Fame. From this point onward, a maximum of 5 straight wins was introduced before a song would be sent to the Hall of Fame.

The next song in the Combat Zone Hall of Fame was Korn's "Freak On A Leash". Eminem holds the record for most songs in the Hall of Fame appearing in nine videos that have been retired.

== List of videos in the Combat Zone Hall of Fame ==
- Korn, "Freak On A Leash" (March 19, 1999 – May 16, 1999)
- Backstreet Boys, "I Want It That Way" (June 25, 1999 – August 13, 1999)
- Dr. Dre featuring Eminem, "Forgot About Dre" (April 7, 2000 – May 28, 2000)
- Eminem, "The Real Slim Shady" (June 23, 2000 – August 6, 2000)
- Eminem, "The Way I Am" (September 8, 2000 – October 29, 2000)
- Limp Bizkit, "Rollin' (Air Raid Vehicle)" (November 17, 2000 – January 12, 2001)
- Shaggy featuring Rayvon, "Angel" (March 16, 2001 – May 4, 2001)
- D12, "Purple Hills" (July 15, 2001 – August 31, 2001)
- D12, "Fight Music" (December 7, 2001 – January 20, 2002)
- Shakira, "Whenever, Wherever" (January 25, 2002 – March 10, 2002)
- Eminem, "Without Me" (May 24, 2002 – July 7, 2002)
- Eminem, "Cleanin' Out My Closet" (August 18, 2002 – October 4, 2002)
- Nelly featuring Kelly Rowland, "Dilemma" (October 6, 2002 – November 17, 2002)
- Eminem, "Lose Yourself" (November 24, 2002 – January 19, 2003)
- Eminem, "Sing For The Moment" (March 28, 2003 – May 16, 2003)
- Good Charlotte, "The Young And The Hopeless" (May 30, 2003 – July 13, 2003)
- Good Charlotte, "Girls And Boys" (August 23, 2003 – September 14, 2003)
- Linkin Park, "Numb" (October 26, 2003 – December 5, 2003)
- Good Charlotte, "Hold On" (December 7, 2003 – January 30, 2004)
- Blink 182, "I Miss You" (February 13, 2004 – March 26, 2004)
- Avril Lavigne, "My Happy Ending" (July 23, 2004 – September 10, 2004)
- Green Day, "American Idiot" (September 12, 2004 – October 24, 2004)
- Green Day, "Boulevard Of Broken Dreams" (December 12, 2004 – February 6, 2005)
- Green Day, "Holiday" (March 20, 2005 – May 6, 2005)
- Sum 41, "Some Say" (July 22, 2005 – September 13, 2005)
- Green Day, "Jesus Of Suburbia" (November 25, 2005 – January 13, 2006)
- Fallout Boy, "Dance, Dance" (January 20, 2006 – February 17, 2006)
- Kelly Clarkson, "Walk Away" (2006–2006)
- Red Hot Chili Peppers, "Dani California" (2006–2006)
- AFI, "Prelude 12/21/Miss Murder" (2006–2006)
- Billy Talent, "Red Flag" (2006–2006)
- My Chemical Romance, "Welcome To The Black Parade" (2006–2006)
