= Traci Melchor =

Canadian television personality

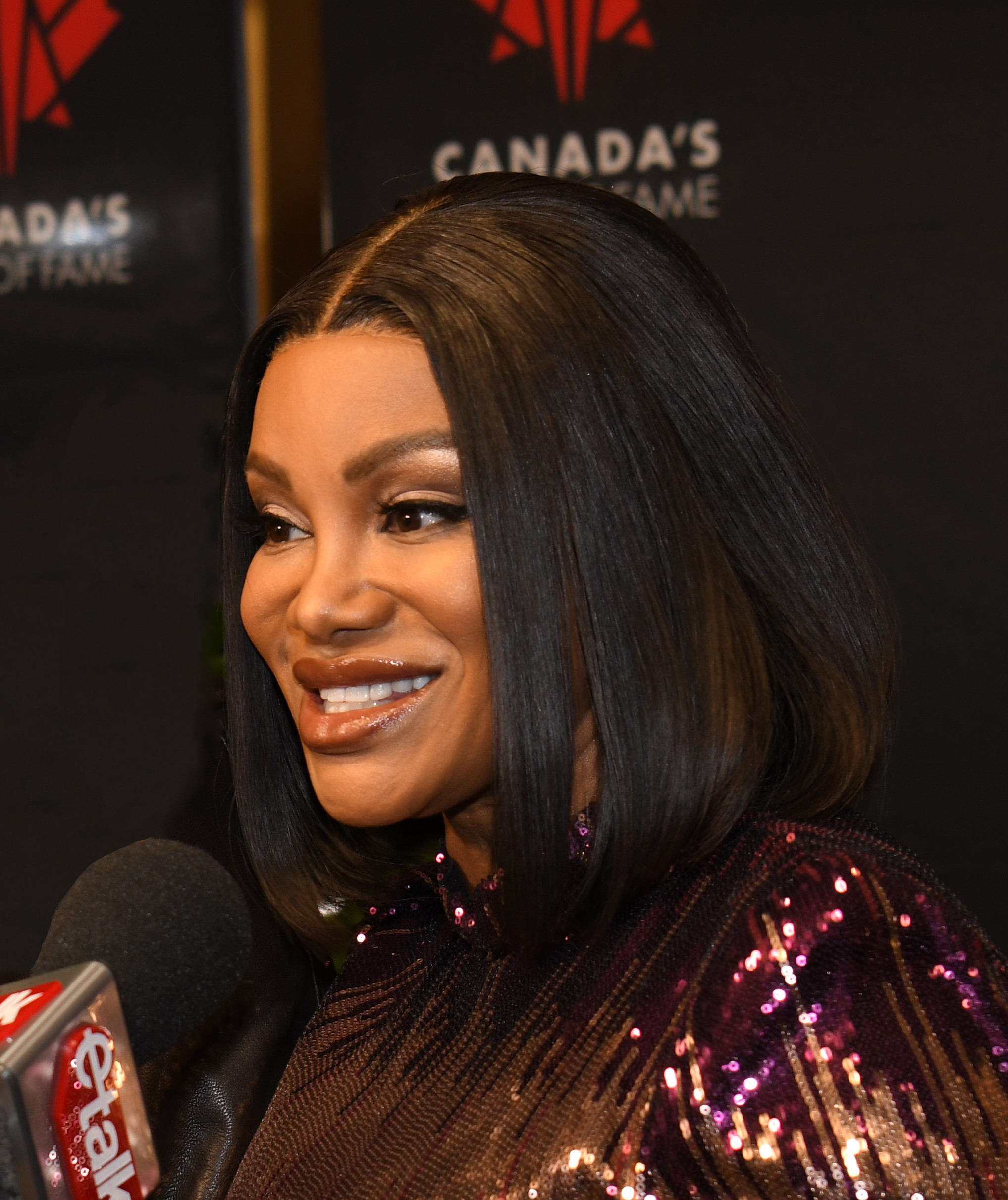
- Melchor in 2022
- Born: Pickering, Ontario, Canada
- Occupation: Television personality
- Years active: 1988–present
- Children: 2

Traci Melchor is a Canadian television personality. She is known for her role as an entertainment reporter for CTV's series etalk and as a judge of the reality competition series Canada's Drag Race. Melchor is also the former co-host of CTV's The Social. Melchor has won two Canadian Screen Awards for her work hosting Canada's Drag Race.

== Early life ==
Originally from Pickering, Ontario, Melchor studied radio and television broadcasting at Seneca College. She has a son, Phoenix and a daughter, Phoebe. She talked on Canada’s Drag Race about her experiences growing up around violence.

== Career ==
She joined CHUM Limited as an entertainment reporter for Citytv, later becoming a cohost of MuchMusic's RapCity. She moved to Los Angeles becoming an entertainment reporter and host for E! and taking acting roles in a number of television series, before taking a new role with MuchMusic's sister station MuchMoreMusic.

In 2008, Melchor joined CTV's eTalk as a reporter, and is currently one of their senior correspondents.

In 2020, Melchor appeared in multiple episodes of Canada's Drag Race, the Canadian edition of RuPaul's Drag Race as ‘Canada’s Squirrel Friend’ and a guest judge for the finale episode. In June 2021, it was announced that Melchor would return for the second season as a main judge alongside Brooke Lynn Hytes, Amanda Brugel, and Brad Goreski, replacing Jeffrey Bowyer-Chapman and Stacey McKenzie. Melchor also returned as a main judge for the third season in 2022 and fourth season in 2023.

She also regularly contributes to The Marilyn Denis Show, CP24 Breakfast, CTV News, and Toronto's CHUM-FM.

== Awards and nominations ==
Year	Award	Category	Work	Results	Ref.
2021	Canadian Screen Awards	Best Host in a Web Program or Series	Canada's Drag Race	Nominated	
2022	Canadian Screen Awards	Best Host or Presenter, Factual or Reality/Competition (Shared with Brooke Lynn Hytes, Amanda Brugel, and Brad Goreski)	Canada's Drag Race	Won	
2023	Canadian Screen Awards	Best Host or Presenter, Factual or Reality/Competition (Shared with Brooke Lynn Hytes and Brad Goreski)	Canada's Drag Race	Won	
2024	Canadian Screen Awards	Best Host or Presenter, Factual or Reality/Competition (Shared with Brooke Lynn Hytes and Brad Goreski)	Canada's Drag Race	Won	
2024	Canadian Screen Awards	Best Host, talk show or entertainment news (Shared with Tyrone Edwards, Elaine Lui, Chloe Wilde, Sonia Mangat, Liz Trinnear and Priyanka)	eTalk	Nominated	
2024	Canadian Screen Awards	Best Host, live entertainment special (Shared with Tyrone Edwards and Elaine Lui)	eTalk Live at the Oscars	Nominated	
