= Elaine Lui =

Canadian journalist

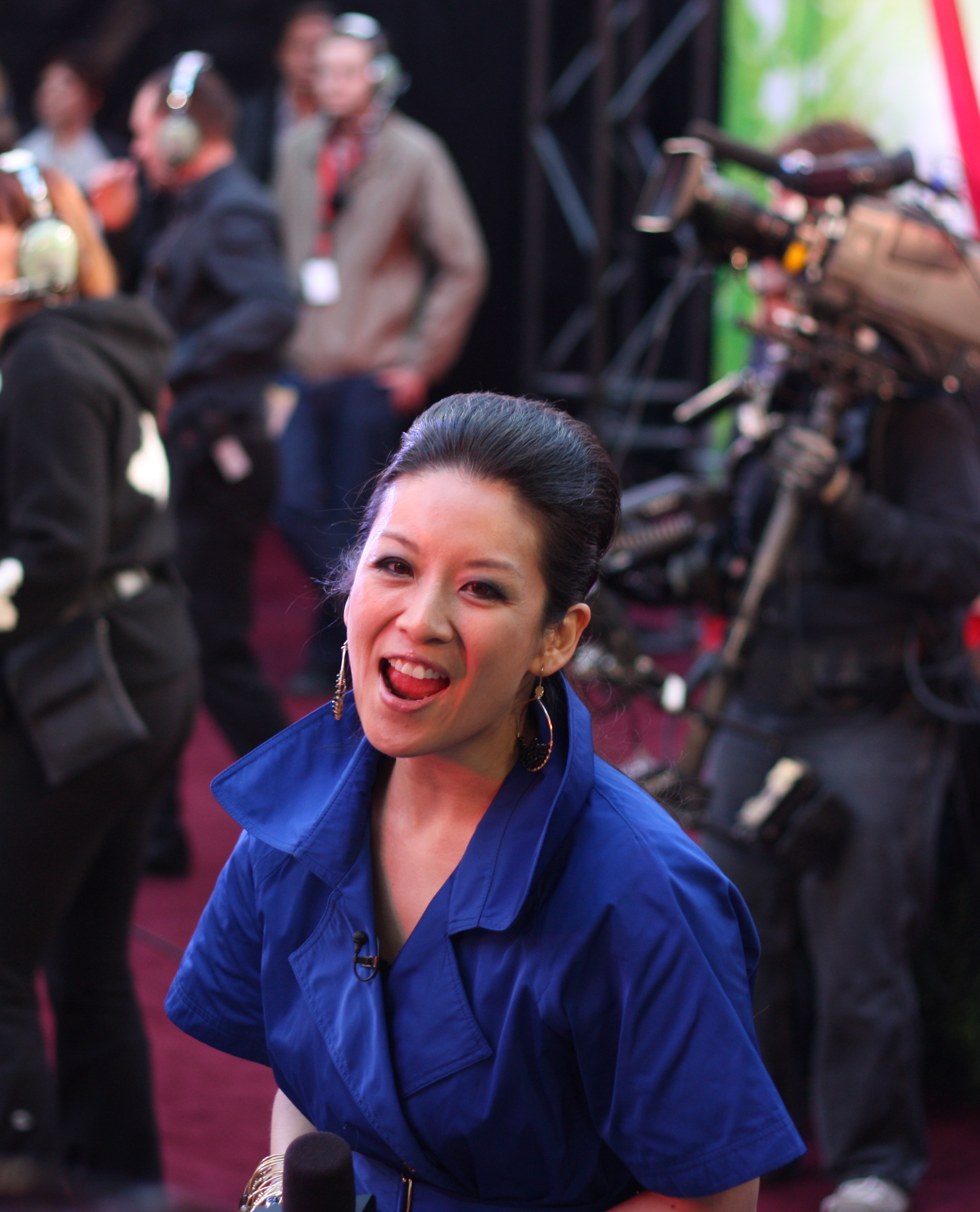
- Lui in 2009
- Born: September 26, 1973 (age 53); Toronto, Ontario, Canada
- Education: University of Western Ontario
- Occupations: Television personality, reporter
- Years active: 1990–present
- Spouse: Jacek Szenowicz (m. 2001)

Elaine "Lainey" Lui (Chinese: 雷若芬, born September 26, 1973) is a Canadian television personality and reporter. She has a website called LaineyGossip, is an anchor on CTV's etalk, and was a co-host on CTV's daily talk series The Social.

== Early life and education ==
Lui was born and raised in Toronto. Her parents, Judy and Bernard, immigrated to Canada from Hong Kong in 1970. They worked odd jobs, including washing dishes and cleaning hotel rooms. Eventually, her father found stable work as an accountant. When Lui was 6, her parents divorced and her mother returned to Hong Kong. Lui spent many summers in Hong Kong to visit her mother. Her parents reunited when she was 16.

Lui attended middle school and high school at the Toronto French School and graduated from Lawrence Park Collegiate Institute. In 1996, she graduated with a B.A. in French and history from the University of Western Ontario.

== Career ==
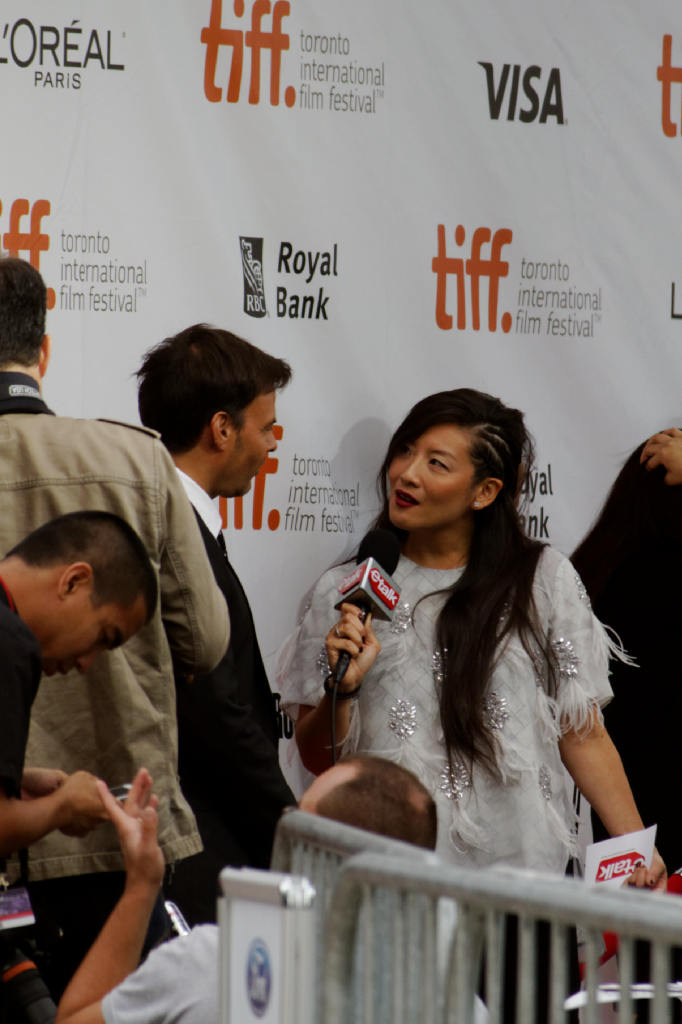
Lainey interviewing François Ozon, director of The New Girlfriend

After graduating from Western, she worked for Rogers Communications and trained employees to install Internet connections.

Lui worked in not-for-profit fundraising. She had been living in Vancouver and working for the University of British Columbia when she returned to Toronto to care for her mother, who needed a kidney transplant. She then took a job with Covenant House, which offers shelter and services for the homeless. LaineyGossip.com grew out of an email that Lui sent to two friends to keep them up to date on celebrity gossip. The subscriber list quickly grew and she started her blog. She left Covenant House in 2006 to commit herself full-time to her blog.

etalk, CTV's Canadian entertainment newsmagazine, hired Lui in 2006. Since joining etalk, Lui has covered the Oscars, the Super Bowl, the JUNO Awards, Sundance Film Festival, Cannes Film Festival, Toronto International Film Festival (TIFF) and the MuchMusic Video Awards (MMVAs).

The Social premiered on September 2, 2013, with Lui as co-host alongside Melissa Grelo, Cynthia Loyst and Traci Melchor. The show airs daily at 1 p.m. on CTV.

Lui participated in the 2015 edition of Canada Reads, where she advocated for Raziel Reid's novel When Everything Feels Like the Movies.

Lainey made her acting debut on Murdoch Mysteries, season 18, episode 12, as Gail, a gossip columnist, who attended the grand opening of the Royal Ontario Museum. She also appeared as herself hosting eTalk alongside Tyrone Edwards in the episode "Rose" of Crave's sports romance drama Heated Rivalry.

=== Hosting the Smut Soiree ===
Lui hosts the Smut Soiree, an annual event at which she talks about the latest gossip in pop culture and Hollywood. The event was first held in 2005.

== Personal life ==
Lui married Jacek Szenowicz when she was 28 years old. They now reside in Toronto with their dogs Barney and Elvis. Jacek helps to run LaineyGossip.com. Lui has stated that she and her husband do not wish to have children.

== Controversy ==
In June 2020, comments made by Lui on her website resurfaced, causing scandal, after Lui accused Jessica Mulroney of using her white privilege against lifestyle blogger Sasha Exeter, the niece of Lui's co-star at the time on The Social, Marci Ien. These included comments described as body-shaming, slut-shaming, homophobic, transphobic, racist, sexist, misogynistic and ageist. These comments sparked outrage and were widely discussed on social media. However, unlike Mulroney, Lui faced no disciplinary action and retained all of her jobs. In April 2021, Lui was quoted as saying, "For me, part of restorative justice is making contrition an ongoing process [...] I don’t ever plan to get to a point where I say, ‘I don’t want to talk about this anymore.’ I’ll talk about it as much as anyone wants me to talk about it. I don’t think an apology is a one-and-done thing [...] I’m trying to be much more aware of not benefitting but also taking responsibility — but not being praised for taking responsibility. It’s a very uncomfortable place to be.”

== Writing ==
- Lui, Elaine (April 1, 2014). Listen to the Squawking Chicken: When Mother Knows Best, What's A Daughter to Do? A Memoir (Sort Of). Toronto: Random House Canada. ISBN 978-0345813473.

== Awards ==
Award	Date of ceremony	Category	Work	Result	Ref(s)
Canadian Screen Awards	2018	Host in a live program or series	eTalk with Ben Mulroney, Danielle Graham	Nominated	
Canadian Screen Awards	2019	Host in a program or series	The Social with Melissa Grelo, Cynthia Loyst, Marci Ien	Nominated	
Canadian Screen Awards	2019	Host in a live program or series	The Social with Melissa Grelo, Cynthia Loyst, Marci Ien	Nominated	
Canadian Screen Awards	2019	Host, web program or series	eTalk Live: The Oscars Balcony	Won	
Canadian Screen Awards	2020	Host, Talk Show or Entertainment News	Love Island: Aftersun with Danielle Graham, Jessica Allen	Nominated	
Canadian Screen Awards	2020	Host, Talk Show or Entertainment News	eTalk Presents: Coming Home with Sandra Oh	Nominated	
Canadian Screen Awards	2020	Host, Live Entertainment Special	eTalk Live at the Oscars with Ben Mulroney, Danielle Graham	Nominated	
Canadian Screen Awards	2020	Host, Web Program or Series	eTalk Live from the Oscars Balcony with Danielle Graham	Nominated	
Canadian Screen Awards	2021	Host, talk show or entertainment news	The Social with Melissa Grelo, Cynthia Loyst, Marci Ien, Jessica Allen	Nominated	
Canadian Screen Awards	2021	Host, live entertainment special	eTalk Live at the Oscars with Ben Mulroney, Danielle Graham	Nominated	
Canadian Screen Awards	2021	Live Production, Social Media	eTalk Live from the Oscars Balcony with Chris Perez, Beth Maher, Michelle Crespi, Danielle Graham, Amber Buchanan, Devin Mandeville	Nominated	
Canadian Screen Awards	2022	Host in a Web Program or Series	24th Annual Toronto Film Critics Association Awards with Kathleen Newman-Bremang	Nominated	
Canadian Screen Awards	2024	Best Host, Talk Show or Entertainment News	eTalk with Tyrone Edwards, Traci Melchor, Chloe Wilde, Sonia Mangat, Liz Trinnear, Priyanka	Nominated	
Canadian Screen Awards	2024	Best Host, Live Entertainment Special	eTalk Live at the Oscars with Tyrone Edwards, Traci Melchor	Nominated	
Canadian Screen Awards	2024	Best Host, Lifestyle	The Social with Melissa Grelo, Cynthia Loyst, Andrea Bain, Jessica Allen	Nominated	
