= Etalk =

Canadian entertainment news television show

etalk
- Also known as: Entertainment Now (1995–2002); eTalk Daily (2002–03)
- Presented by: Tyrone Edwards
- Country of origin: Canada
- Original language: English
- No. of seasons: 19

Production
- Production location: Bell Media Queen Street
- Running time: 30 minutes

Original release
- Network: CTV
- Release: 1995 – present

etalk (formerly known as eTalk Daily) is a Canadian entertainment news television show that also serves as the flagship entertainment program for CTV, anchored by Tyrone Edwards. The weekday program airs on CTV at 7:00 p.m. ET/PT and CTV 2 at 7:30 p.m. ET/PT, and also back-to-back on other Bell Media television stations.

== History ==
The series began as Entertainment Now (or eNow), originally hosted by Lin Eleoff, who was replaced by Carla Collins, who later co-anchored with Dan Duran, and began airing weekly on BBS (later absorbed into CTV) in 1995. Much as now, in its original form eNow used a toned-down version of the standard entertainment magazine format. in 2000, eNow relaunched as etalk, a weekly entertainment-oriented talk show hosted by Ben Mulroney with a variety of rotating guest panelists. It was produced by the CTV-owned talktv (now MTV) and taped on the set of The Chatroom, of which Mulroney was a co-host.

Following cancellation of The Chatroom in 2002, etalk, along with co-host Thea Andrews, returned to its original format. etalk became a daily series on the CTV daytime schedule in fall 2002, accompanied by a temporary name change to etalk Daily; as such, CTV generally regards 2002 as the start date for the current series. It was switched to primetime airings on June 9, 2003, coinciding with the launch of Canadian Idol. Thea Andrews left the show in 2003 and later emerged as a reporter for Entertainment Tonight in 2007.

Entertainment journalist David Giammarco was asked to join the show in early 2003 as senior entertainment reporter, bringing numerous celebrity interviews and exclusives.

etalk was also added to the schedule of Star! in October 2007 after CTVglobemedia acquired control of that channel via the acquisition of CHUM Limited and cancelled Star!'s former entertainment newscast Star! Daily. Since March 2008, etalk has been produced from 299 Queen Street West. The show shared production space with Citytv's Breakfast Television and CityLine until September 8, 2009, when Citytv's moved to its new headquarters at 33 Dundas Street East. The street front studio was re-configured for etalk, and later for The Marilyn Denis Show.

On June 22, 2020, Ben Mulroney announced his resignation as host of etalk as a result of the George Floyd protests; in a statement, Mulroney announced that "more than ever, we need more Black voices, more Indigenous voices, more people of colour in the media as well as every other profession – and that is why I have decided to immediately step away from my role at etalk to create space for a new perspective and a new voice." His resignation came in the wake of a controversy in which his wife was accused of bullying and threatening Sasha Exeter, a Black influencer.

On September 14, 2020, CTV announced Tyrone Edwards as the new co-anchor of etalk. In 2024, Michaella Montana joined the show as its first full-time Indigenous reporter and co-host.

== On-air staff ==
=== Current ===
- Tyrone Edwards – Anchor
- Traci Melchor – Senior Correspondent
- Elaine "Lainey" Lui – Senior Correspondent
- Sonia Mangat - correspondent
- Priyanka - correspondent
- Liz Trinnear - correspondent
- Chloe Wilde - correspondent
- Michaella Montana - correspondent

=== Former ===
- Thea Andrews – Co-host
- David Giammarco – Senior Entertainment Reporter
- Anna Cyzon – Reporter
- Jesse Palmer – Reporter
- Jully Black – Celebrity Reporter
- Sophie Grégoire – Quebec Correspondent
- Leah Miller – Correspondent
- Susie Wall – Reporter
- Tanya Kim – Co-Host
- Jessi Cruickshank – Reporter
- Devon Soltendieck - Senior Reporter
- Ben Mulroney – Co-host
- Danielle Graham – Co-host
