= E! (Canadian TV channel) =

Canadian entertainment TV channel

Coordinates: 43.649701°N 79.390233°W

- Country: Canada
- Broadcast area: Nationwide
- Headquarters: Toronto, Ontario

Programming
- Picture format: 1080i HDTV (downscaled to letterboxed 480i for the SDTV feed)

Ownership
- Owner: Bell Media (branding licensed from Versant)

History
- Launched: September 10, 1999; 27 years ago
- Closed: 31 December 2026; 45 days' time
- Former names: Star! (1999–2010)

Links
- Website: eonline.com/ca

E! is a Canadian English language discretionary specialty channel owned by Bell Media. It primarily airs entertainment programming and series relating to celebrities and popular culture.

The network was originally launched in 1999 as Star!, under the ownership of CHUM Limited. In 2010, then-owner CTVglobemedia announced an agreement with Comcast to license the branding and programming of similar U.S. network E!, resulting in its rebranding on November 29, 2010.

The channel is scheduled to cease broadcasting on December 31, 2026.

== History ==
The channel was licensed in 1996 by the Canadian Radio-television and Telecommunications Commission and was launched on September 10, 1999 as Star!, which was originally owned by CHUM Limited.

In July 2006, Bell Globemedia (later renamed CTVglobemedia) announced that it would purchase CHUM for an estimated $1.7 billion CAD, including Star!. The sale was subject to CRTC approval and was approved in June 2007 (under the condition that it divest CHUM's Citytv stations), with the transaction completed on June 22, 2007. Following the change in ownership, the channel's entertainment news program Star! Daily was cancelled in defense of CTV's eTalk Daily.

Until 2007, Star! had acquired some of its programming from the similar U.S. cable network E!; in 2007, owner Comcast announced an agreement with Canwest Global, under which it would acquire the Canadian rights to E! programming, and rebrand its broadcast television system CH as a Canadian version of E!. In August 2009, amid Canwest's bankruptcy, the E! system was shut down, and its stations were either divested to new owners, switched to parent network Global, or shut down. During that time, Star's schedule consisted mostly of second-run talk shows and entertainment news shows repeated from CTV and its secondary A system (formerly A-Channel, now CTV Two), including FashionTelevision, The Tonight Show with Jay Leno, The Ellen DeGeneres Show, and TMZ.

In November 2010, CTVglobemedia announced it had signed a multi-year and multi-platform deal with Comcast to return the E! brand back to Canada. Under the agreement, Star! was relaunched as E! on November 29, 2010, returning that network's programming to the schedule. Ownership changed hands again, when on April 1, 2011, Bell Canada gained control of CTVglobemedia, with the merged company becoming known as Bell Media.

In November 2026, television provider Hay Communications published notice that Bell Media would cease distribution of E! a minute before midnight Eastern Time on December 31, 2026, though Bell Media has yet to announce anything further.

=== Logos ===
Original logo as Star! from 1999 to 2004.

Second network logo from 2004 to 2010.

E! logo utilized from 2010 to 2012.

== Programs ==
While E! is very similar to its American counterpart, it also incorporates reruns of shows that have aired on other Bell Media services (and which often were shot in Canada, allowing them to fulfill Canadian content quotas) including the original iteration of CSI, Reign, Being Human, and Supernatural.
