= Lists of Canadian network television schedules =

The following is a list of Canadian network television schedules (primetime schedules only).

== 1990s ==
- 1998–99 Canadian network television schedule
- 1999–2000 Canadian network television schedule

== 2000s ==
- 2000–01 Canadian network television schedule
- 2001–02 Canadian network television schedule
- 2002–03 Canadian network television schedule
- 2003–04 Canadian network television schedule
- 2004–05 Canadian network television schedule
- 2005–06 Canadian network television schedule
- 2006–07 Canadian network television schedule
- 2007–08 Canadian network television schedule
- 2008–09 Canadian network television schedule
- 2009–10 Canadian network television schedule

== 2010s ==
- 2010–11 Canadian network television schedule
- 2011–12 Canadian network television schedule
- 2012–13 Canadian network television schedule
- 2013–14 Canadian network television schedule
- 2014–15 Canadian network television schedule
- 2015–16 Canadian network television schedule
- 2016–17 Canadian network television schedule
- 2017–18 Canadian network television schedule
- 2018–19 Canadian network television schedule

== 2020s ==
- 2020–21 Canadian network television schedule
- 2021–22 Canadian network television schedule
- 2022–23 Canadian network television schedule
- 2023–24 Canadian network television schedule
- 2024–25 Canadian network television schedule
- 2025–26 Canadian network television schedule
