= 1998–99 Canadian network television schedule =

The 1998–99 Canadian network television schedule indicates the fall prime time schedules for Canada's major English and French broadcast networks.

Canadian content shown in the tables have a	red	highlight.

== 1998 official fall schedule ==
=== Sunday ===
PM	7:00	7:30	8:00	8:30	9:00	9:30	10:00	10:30
CBC	Emily of New Moon		Movies & Specials				CBC News: Sunday Night	Undercurrents
CTV	Felicity		Charmed		Movies & Specials			
Global	60 Minutes		The Simpsons	That '70s Show	The X-Files		The Practice	
SRC	Découverte	La Vie d'artiste	Les Beaux Dimanches				Le Téléjournal	Suspect No. 1
TVA	Fort Boyard		Movies				TVA Nouvelles	Quotidienne
TQS	Catastrophes		Movies				Le Grand Journal	Planète Pub

=== Monday ===
PM	7:00	7:30	8:00	8:30	9:00	9:30	10:00	10:30
CBC	Air Farce	SketchCom	This Hour Has 22 Minutes	Made in Canada	Life and Times		The National	
CTV	Wheel of Fortune	Jeopardy!	Melrose Place		Ally McBeal		L.A. Doctors	
Global	Entertainment Tonight	DiResta	Cosby	Mad About You	Caroline in the City	The Brian Benben Show	Brimstone	
SRC	Virginie	La Petite Vie	4 et demi...		Omertà		Le Téléjournal/Le Point	
TVA	Chasse trésors	Various programs	Beverly Hills, 90210		Salle d'urgence		TVA Nouvelles	Le Poing J
TQS	Loft Story	Hercule		Accès interdit		Le Grand Journal	La Fin du monde est à 7 heures	110 pour cent

=== Tuesday ===
PM	7:00	7:30	8:00	8:30	9:00	9:30	10:00	10:30
CBC	On the Arts	The Health Show	Marketplace	Venture	the fifth estate		The National	
CTV	Wheel of Fortune	Jeopardy!	Home Improvement	Costello	Spin City	Sports Night	W-Five	
Global	Entertainment Tonight	(to be confirmed)	King of the Hill	The Hughleys	Dharma and Greg	3rd Rock from the Sun	NYPD Blue	
SRC	Virginie	La Facture	Bouscotte		Réseaux/Enjeux		Le Téléjournal/Le Point	
TVA	Ent'Cadieux		Melrose Place		Les Machos		TVA Nouvelles	Le Poing J
TQS	Henri, sa gang	Various programs		Black-out		Le Grand Journal	La Fin du monde est à 7 heures	110 pour cent

=== Wednesday ===
PM	7:00	7:30	8:00	8:30	9:00	9:30	10:00	10:30
CBC	On the Road Again	Country Canada	This Hour Has 22 Minutes	Comics!	Da Vinci's Inquest		The National	
CTV	Wheel of Fortune	Jeopardy!	Due South		The Drew Carey Show	The Secret Lives of Men	Law & Order	
Global	Entertainment Tonight	Clueless	Beverly Hills, 90210		Party of Five		Chicago Hope	
SRC	Virginie	Caserne 24	Various programs		Various programs		Le Téléjournal/Le Point	
TVA	La Poule aux oeufs d'or	Sportive/Caméra choc	Le retour		Sauve qui peut!		TVA Nouvelles	Le Poing J
TQS	Les Simpson	Movies				Le Grand Journal	La Fin du monde est à 7 heures	110 pour cent

=== Thursday ===
PM	7:00	7:30	8:00	8:30	9:00	9:30	10:00	10:30
CBC	Riverdale		The Nature of Things		Witness		The National	
CTV	Wheel of Fortune	Jeopardy!	Power Play		The Drew Carey Show	Veronica's Closet	ER	
Global	Entertainment Tonight	Sabrina, the Teenage Witch	Friends	Jesse	Frasier	Frasier (2nd episode)	Traders	
SRC	Virginie	Un gars, une fille	Le Moment de vérité		Tous pour un		Le Téléjournal/Le Point	
TVA	Fais-moi rire	Various programs	Diva		Ces enfants d'ailleurs, suite		TVA Nouvelles	Le Poing J
TQS	Hockey/Specials					Le Grand Journal	La Fin du monde est à 7 heures	110 pour cent

=== Friday ===
PM	7:00	7:30	8:00	8:30	9:00	9:30	10:00	10:30
CBC	Mr. Bean	Just for Laughs	Air Farce	The Red Green Show	Black Harbour		The National	
CTV	Wheel of Fortune	Jeopardy!	Dateline NBC		Trinity		Cold Squad	
Global	Entertainment Tonight	(to be confirmed)	Dawson's Creek		Millennium		20/20	
SRC	Various programs		La Fureur		Zone libre		Le Téléjournal/Le Point	
TVA	JE		Movies				TVA Nouvelles	Le Poing J / other programs
TQS	Scene du crime	Coroner	Métier policier	Aux frontières de réel		Le Grand Journal	La Fin du monde est à 7 heures	110 pour cent

=== Saturday ===
PM	7:00	7:30	8:00	8:30	9:00	9:30	10:00	10:30
CBC	Hockey Night in Canada							
CTV	Earth: Final Conflict		COPS	COPS (2nd episode)	America's Most Wanted		Nikita	
Global	Flash Forward	Bob and Margaret	Early Edition		Fantasy Island		Cupid	
SRC	La Soirée du hockey						Le Téléjournal	Nouvelles du sport
TVA	Movies & Specials							
TQS	Movies							Le Grand Journal
