= 2006–07 Canadian network television schedule =

The 2006–07 Canadian network television schedule indicates the fall prime time schedules for Canada's major English broadcast networks. For schedule changes after the fall launch, please consult each network's individual article.

Canadian content shows in the tables have a	red	highlight.

== 2006 official fall schedule ==
=== Sunday ===
PM	7:00	7:30	8:00	8:30	9:00	9:30	10:00	10:30
CBC	Just For Laughs		Movies & Specials				CBC News: Sunday Night	
CTV	Law and Order: Criminal Intent		The Amazing Race		Desperate Housewives		Studio 60 on the Sunset Strip	
Global	The Simpsons	King of the Hill	The Simpsons	American Dad!	Family Guy	The War at Home	Brothers & Sisters	

=== Monday ===
PM	7:00	7:30	8:00	8:30	9:00	9:30	10:00	10:30
CBC	Coronation Street	Royal Canadian Air Farce	Doctor Who		72 Hours: True Crime	Rumours	The National	
CTV	eTalk	Jeopardy!	Corner Gas	The Class	Smith		CSI: Miami	
Global	ET Canada	Entertainment Tonight	Prison Break		Heroes		Vanished	

=== Tuesday ===
PM	7:00	7:30	8:00	8:30	9:00	9:30	10:00	10:30
CBC	Coronation Street	Canadian Antiques Roadshow	Rick Mercer Report	This Hour Has 22 Minutes	Intelligence		The National	
CTV	eTalk	Jeopardy!	Dancing with the Stars			Degrassi: The Next Generation	Law & Order: Special Victims Unit	
Global	ET Canada	Entertainment Tonight	Standoff		House		Gilmore Girls	

=== Wednesday ===
PM	7:00	7:30	8:00	8:30	9:00	9:30	10:00	10:30
CBC	Coronation Street	Marketplace	Dragons' Den		The Fifth Estate		The National	
CTV	eTalk	Jeopardy!	Medium		Lost		CSI: NY	
Global	ET Canada	Entertainment Tonight	Bones		Six Degrees		Kidnapped	

=== Thursday ===
PM	7:00	7:30	8:00	8:30	9:00	9:30	10:00	10:30
CBC	Coronation Street	On the Road Again	Underdogs		Opening Night		The National	
CTV	eTalk	Jeopardy!	Grey's Anatomy		CSI		ER	
Global	ET Canada	Entertainment Tonight	Survivor: Cook Islands		Deal or No Deal		Shark	

=== Friday ===
PM	7:00	7:30	8:00	8:30	9:00	9:30	10:00	10:30
CBC	Coronation Street	This Hour Has 22 Minutes	Royal Canadian Air Farce	Rick Mercer Report	Jozi-H		The National	
CTV	eTalk	Jeopardy!	Ghost Whisperer		Close to Home		Law and Order	
Global	ET Canada	Entertainment Tonight	Falcon Beach		Las Vegas		Numb3rs	

=== Saturday ===
PM	7:00	7:30	8:00	8:30	9:00	9:30	10:00	10:30
CBC	Hockey Night in Canada							
CTV	W-FIVE		Crimetime Saturday		The Knights of Prosperity	30 Rock	The Nine	
Global	Global Currents		Very Bad Men		Blue Murder		ReGenesis	

== Top weekly ratings ==
- Note: English Canadian television only by viewers age 2 and up
- "official website". bbm.ca. Archived from the original on October 2, 2008.

Week	Name	Viewers (in millions)	Network
August 28 – September 3	Canadian Idol 4	2.021	CTV
September 4 – September 10	House	2.970	Global
September 11 – September 17	Survivor: Cook Island	3.023	Global
September 18 – September 24	CSI: Crime Scene Investigation	3.506	CTV
September 24 – September 30	House	3.299	Global
September 25 – October 1	CSI: Crime Scene Investigation	3.801	CTV
October 2 – October 8	CSI: Crime Scene Investigation	3.555	CTV
October 9 – October 15	CSI: Crime Scene Investigation	4.043	CTV
October 16 – October 22	CSI: NY	3.657	CTV
October 23 – October 29	CSI: Miami	2.638	CTV
October 30 – November 5	CSI: Crime Scene Investigation	3.189	CTV
November 6 – November 12	House	2.962	Global
November 13 – November 19	CSI: Crime Scene Investigation	3.860	CTV
November 20 – November 26	CSI: Crime Scene Investigation	3.609	CTV
November 27 – December 3	Criminal Minds	2.725	CTV
December 4 – December 10	CSI: Crime Scene Investigation	3.141	CTV
December 11 – December 17	House	2.474	Global
December 18 – December 24	CSI: Miami	1.705	CTV
December 25 – December 31	CSI: Crime Scene Investigation	1.749	CTV
January 1 – January 7	CSI: Crime Scene Investigation	3.504	CTV
January 8 – January 14	House	3.537	Global
January 15 – January 21	CSI: Crime Scene Investigation	3.278	CTV
January 22 – January 28	CSI: Crime Scene Investigation	3.505	CTV
January 29 – February 4	CSI: Crime Scene Investigation	3.667	CTV
February 5 – February 11	CSI: Crime Scene Investigation	3.557	CTV
February 12 – February 18	CSI: Crime Scene Investigation	3.464	CTV
February 19 – February 25	79th Academy Awards	4.895	CTV
February 26 – March 4	American Idol 6	2.510	CTV
March 5 – March 11	American Idol 6	2.522	CTV
March 12 – March 18	American Idol 6	2.742	CTV
March 19 – March 25	American Idol 6	2.702	CTV
March 26 – April 1	CSI: Crime Scene Investigation	2.081	CTV
April 2 – April 8	American Idol 6	2.923	CTV
April 9 – April 15	American Idol 6	2.890	CTV
April 16 – April 22	American Idol 6	2.843	CTV
April 23 – April 29	CSI: Crime Scene Investigation	2.845	CTV
April 30 – May 6	CSI: Crime Scene Investigation	2.903	CTV
May 7 – May 13	CSI: Crime Scene Investigation	2.803	CTV
May 14–20	CSI: Crime Scene Investigation	3.029	CTV
May 21 – May 27	American Idol 6	2.532	CTV
May 28 – June 3	House	2.642	Global
June 4 – June 10	2007 Stanley Cup Finals	2.500	CBC
June 11 – June 17	Canadian Idol 5	1.556	CTV
June 18 – June 24	So You Think You Can Dance 3	1.419	CTV
June 25 – July 1	Canadian Idol 5	1.465	CTV
July 2 – July 8	Canadian Idol 5	1.252	CTV
July 9 – July 15	Canadian Idol 5	1.379	CTV
July 16 – July 22	Canadian Idol 5	1.355	CTV
July 23 – July 29	Canadian Idol 5	1.320	CTV
July 30 – August 5	Canadian Idol 5	1.517	CTV
August 6 – August 12	Canadian Idol 5	1.641	CTV
August 13 – August 19	Canadian Idol 5	1.589	CTV
August 20 – August 26	America's Got Talent	1.708	CTV
