= 2003–04 Canadian network television schedule =

The 2003–04 Canadian network television schedule indicates the fall prime time schedules for Canada's major English broadcast networks. For schedule changes after the fall launch, please consult each network's individual article.

== 2003 official fall schedule ==
Note: Canadian content programs in the tables have a	red	highlight.

=== Sunday ===
PM	7:00	7:30	8:00	8:30	9:00	9:30	10:00	10:30
CBC	The Wonderful World of Disney		Cirque du Soleil		Da Vinci's Inquest		CBC News: Sunday Night	Venture
CTV	Alias		Cold Case		Law & Order: Criminal Intent		Nip/Tuck	
Global	Popstars	The Simpsons	The Simpsons	King of the Hill	Malcolm in the Middle	Arrested Development	Crossing Jordan	
NewNet	America's Funniest Home Videos		10-8: Officers on Duty		Movie			
Citytv	MovieTelevision (R)	Startv (R)	Girls Behaving Badly	The Jamie Kennedy Experiment	Great Movies			
CH

=== Monday ===
PM	7:00	7:30	8:00	8:30	9:00	9:30	10:00	10:30
CBC	This Hour has 22 Minutes	Royal Canadian Air Farce	Rick Mercer Report	The Newsroom	This Is Wonderland		The National	
CTV	Access Hollywood	eTalk Daily	Punk'd	Whoopi	Third Watch		CSI: Miami	
Global	Train 48	Bob and Margaret	Fear Factor		Everybody Loves Raymond	Two and a Half Men	Average Joe	
NewNet	Who Wants to Be a Millionaire	Seinfeld (R)	Primetime Monday		Everwood		Tracker (R)	
Citytv	Seinfeld (R)	Friends (R)	The Next Joe Millionaire		Great Movies			

=== Tuesday ===
PM	7:00	7:30	8:00	8:30	9:00	9:30	10:00	10:30
CBC	Life and Times		72 Hours: True Crime	Marketplace	CBC News: Disclosure		The National	
CTV	Access Hollywood	eTalk Daily	8 Simple Rules	I'm with Her	According to Jim	Less than Perfect	Law & Order: Special Victims Unit	
Global	Train 48	Bob and Margaret	NCIS		Frasier	Happy Family	Judging Amy	
NewNet	Who Wants to Be a Millionaire	Seinfeld (R)	7th Heaven		Movie			
Citytv	Seinfeld (R)	Friends (R)	Smallville		Great Movies			

=== Wednesday ===
PM	7:00	7:30	8:00	8:30	9:00	9:30	10:00	10:30
CBC	The Nature of Things		Snakes and Ladders		The Fifth Estate		The National	
CTV	Access Hollywood	eTalk Daily	My Wife and Kids	Degrassi: The Next Generation	The West Wing		Law & Order	
Global	Train 48	Bob and Margaret	That '70s Show	Will and Grace	Gilmore Girls		Las Vegas	
NewNet	Who Wants to Be a Millionaire	Seinfeld (R)	1-800-Missing		Jake 2.0		Angel	
Citytv	Seinfeld (R)	Friends (R)	Star Trek: Enterprise		The Bachelor		Blind Date	The 5th Wheel

=== Thursday ===
PM	7:00	7:30	8:00	8:30	9:00	9:30	10:00	10:30
CBC	Opening Night		The Canadian Experience		The Passionate Eye		The National	
CTV	Access Hollywood	eTalk Daily	Just For Laughs Gags	Scrubs	CSI		ER	
Global	Train 48	Friends	Survivor: Cook Islands		The Apprentice		Without a Trace	
NewNet	Who Wants to Be a Millionaire	Seinfeld (R)	The Immortal (R)		HypaSpace	Alienated	Primetime Thursday	
Citytv	Seinfeld (R)	Friends (R)	Beastmaster (R)		Great Movies			

=== Friday ===
PM	7:00	7:30	8:00	8:30	9:00	9:30	10:00	10:30
CBC	On the Road Again	Best of Wayne and Shuster	Royal Canadian Air Farce	An American in Canada	The Red Green Show	Just For Laughs Gags	The National	
CTV	Access Hollywood	eTalk Daily	Joan of Arcadia		Charmed		Boomtown	
Global	Train 48	Bob and Margaret	Popstars	It's All Relative	Miss Match		The Handler	
NewNet	Who Wants to Be a Millionaire	Seinfeld (R)	America's Funniest Home Videos (R)		Monk		The Dead Zone	
Citytv	Seinfeld (R)	Friends (R)	Relic Hunter (R)		Great Movies			
CH			JAG		Dateline		20/20	

=== Saturday ===
PM	7:00	7:30	8:00	8:30	9:00	9:30	10:00	10:30
CBC	Hockey Night in Canada							
CTV	W-FIVE		Sue Thomas: F.B.Eye		Comedy Now!	Comedy Inc.	The Osbournes	The Osbournes
Global	Reba	Inside Entertainment	Stargate SG-1		Jeremiah		The Shield	
NewNet	Adventure Inc. (R)		COPS	COPS	America's Most Wanted		Starhunter	
Citytv	MovieTelevision	Startv	MediaTelevision	Speakers' Corner	Great Movies			

== Top weekly ratings ==
- Note: English Canadian television only by viewers age 2 and up
- "official website". BBM Canada. Archived from the original on January 20, 2010.

Week	Name	Viewers (in millions)	Network
September 1-September 7	Canadian Idol 1	2.661	CTV
September 8-September 14	Canadian Idol 1	2.173	CTV
September 15-September 21	Survivor: Pearl Islands	3.578	Global
September 22-September 28	CSI: Crime Scene Investigation	2.699	CTV
September 29-October 5	Survivor: Pearl Islands	3.204	Global
October 6-October 12	Survivor: Pearl Islands	3.217	Global
October 13-October 19	Survivor: Pearl Islands	3.013	Global
October 20-October 26	Survivor: Pearl Islands	3.255	Global
October 27-November 2	Survivor: Pearl Islands	3.133	Global
November 3-November 9	Survivor: Pearl Islands	3.462	Global
November 10-November 16	Survivor: Pearl Islands	3.480	Global
November 17-November 23	Survivor: Pearl Islands	3.325	Global
November 24-November 30	Survivor: Pearl Islands	3.021	Global
December 1-December 7	Survivor: Pearl Islands	3.640	Global
December 8-December 14	Survivor: Pearl Islands	3.836	Global
December 15-December 21	CSI: Miami	2.467	CTV
December 22-December 28	CSI: Miami	1.719	CTV
December 29-January 4	World Idol	2.240	CTV
January 5-January 11	CSI: Crime Scene Investigation	3.038	CTV
January 12-January 18	CSI: Crime Scene Investigation	2.717	CTV
January 19-January 25	61st Golden Globe Awards	2.831	CTV
January 26-February 1	Survivor: All-Stars	3.611	Global
February 2-February 8	Survivor: All-Stars	4.008	Global
February 9-February 15	Survivor: All-Stars	3.708	Global
February 16-February 22	Survivor: All-Stars	3.772	Global
February 23-February 29	76th Academy Awards	5.674	CTV
March 1-March 7	Survivor: All-Stars	3.810	Global
March 8-March 14	Survivor: All-Stars	3.885	Global
March 15-March 21	Survivor: All-Stars	3.332	Global
March 22-March 28	American Idol 3	2.787	CTV
March 29-April 4	Survivor: All-Stars	3.827	Global
April 5-April 11	Survivor: All-Stars	3.108	Global
April 12-April 18	2004 Stanley Cup Playoffs	3.653	CBC
April 19-April 25	2004 Stanley Cup Playoffs	4.000	CBC
April 26-May 2	Survivor: All-Stars	3.226	Global
May 3-May 9	Friends	5.159	Global
May 10-May 16	Survivor: All-Stars	3.259	Global
May 17-May 23	CSI: Crime Scene Investigation	2.959	CTV
May 24-May 30	2004 Stanley Cup Playoffs	3.333	CBC
May 31-June 6	2004 Stanley Cup Playoffs	5.215	CBC
June 7-June 13	2004 Stanley Cup Playoffs	5.202	CBC
June 14-June 20	Canadian Idol 2	2.076	CTV
June 21-June 27	Canadian Idol 2	1.910	CTV
June 28-July 4	Canadian Idol 2	1.666	CTV
July 5-July 11	Canadian Idol 2	2.135	CTV
July 12-July 18	CSI: Crime Scene Investigation	1.963	CTV
July 19-July 25	The Amazing Race	2.000	CTV
July 26-August 1	Canadian Idol 2	2.077	CTV
August 2-August 8	Canadian Idol 2	2.298	CTV
August 9-August 15	Canadian Idol 2	2.219	CTV
August 16-August 22	Canadian Idol 2	2.266	CTV
August 23-August 29	Canadian Idol 2	2.662	CTV
