= 2004–05 Canadian network television schedule =

The 2004–05 Canadian network television schedule indicates the fall prime time schedules for Canada's major English broadcast networks. For schedule changes after the fall launch, please consult each network's individual article.

Note: No NHL hockey aired on CBC for the whole television season because of the 2004–05 NHL lockout.

Canadian content shows in the tables have a	red	highlight.

== 2004 official fall schedule ==
=== Sunday ===
PM	7:00	7:30	8:00	8:30	9:00	9:30	10:00	10:30
CBC	Marketplace	Venture	The Wonderful World of Disney				CBC News: Sunday Night	
CTV	Desperate Housewives		Cold Case		Law & Order: Criminal Intent		The Eleventh Hour	
Global	King of the Hill	Malcolm in the Middle	Arrested Development	The Simpsons	Family Guy	American Dad!	Judging Amy	

=== Monday ===
PM	7:00	7:30	8:00	8:30	9:00	9:30	10:00	10:30
CBC	Royal Canadian Air Farce	Coronation Street	The Greatest Canadian		Rick Mercer Report	Halifax Comedy	The National	
CTV	Access Hollywood	eTalk	8 Simple Rules	Degrassi: The Next Generation	The O.C.		CSI: Miami	
Global	Train 48	Everybody Loves Raymond	Fear Factor		Las Vegas		LAX	

=== Tuesday ===
PM	7:00	7:30	8:00	8:30	9:00	9:30	10:00	10:30
CBC	This Hour Has 22 Minutes	Coronation Street	Making the Cut: Last Man Standing		This is Wonderland		The National	
CTV	Access Hollywood	eTalk	American Idol		According to Jim	Scrubs	Law & Order: Special Victims Unit	
Global	Train 48	Two and a Half Men	NYPD Blue		Gilmore Girls		House	

=== Wednesday ===
PM	7:00	7:30	8:00	8:30	9:00	9:30	10:00	10:30
CBC	Ciao Bella	Coronation Street	The Passionate Eye		The Fifth Estate		The National	
CTV	Access Hollywood	eTalk	Corner Gas	American Idol	The West Wing		Law & Order	
Global	Train 48	Center of the Universe	That '70s Show	Will and Grace	24		The Mountain	

=== Thursday ===
PM	7:00	7:30	8:00	8:30	9:00	9:30	10:00	10:30
CBC	The Nature of Things		Life and Times		Opening Night		The National	
CTV	Access Hollywood	eTalk	Comedy Inc.	Comedy Now!	CSI		ER	
CTV	Access Hollywood	eTalk	The O.C.		CSI		ER	
Global	Still Standing	Joey	Survivor: Vanuatu		The Apprentice		Without a Trace	

=== Friday ===
PM	7:00	7:30	8:00	8:30	9:00	9:30	10:00	10:30
CBC	The Red Green Show	Coronation Street	Royal Canadian Air Farce	This Hour Has 22 Minutes	Just for Laughs		The National	
CTV	Access Hollywood	eTalk	Joan of Arcadia		Third Watch		Dr. Vegas	
Global	Train 48	Frasier	North Shore		One Tree Hill		JAG	

=== Saturday ===
PM	7:00	7:30	8:00	8:30	9:00	9:30	10:00	10:30
CBC	Life and Times		Movie Night in Canada					
CTV	W-FIVE		Sue Thomas: F.B.Eye		Law & Order		Law & Order: Special Victims Unit	
Global	Doc		Zoe Busiek: Wild Card		Andromeda		Stargate SG-1	

== Top weekly ratings ==
- Note: English Canadian television only by viewers age 2 and up
- "official website". BBM Canada. Archived from the original on January 16, 2010.

Week	Name	Viewers (in millions)	Network
August 30-September 5	Canadian Idol 2	2.480	CTV
September 6-September 12	Canadian Idol 2	2.911	CTV
September 13-September 19	2004 World Cup of Hockey	4.350	CBC
September 20-September 26	CSI: Crime Scene Investigation	3.241	CTV
September 27-October 3	Survivor: Vanuatu	3.252	Global
October 4-October 10	Survivor: Vanuatu	3.036	Global
October 11-October 17	CSI: Crime Scene Investigation	3.155	CTV
October 18-October 24	CSI: Crime Scene Investigation	3.164	CTV
October 25-October 31	Survivor: Vanuatu	3.140	Global
November 1-November 7	CSI: Crime Scene Investigation	3.376	CTV
November 8-November 14	CSI: Crime Scene Investigation	3.303	CTV
November 15-November 21	CSI: Crime Scene Investigation	3.612	CTV
November 22-November 28	Survivor: Vanuatu	2.980	Global
November 29-December 5	Survivor: Vanuatu	2.814	Global
December 6-December 12	CSI: Crime Scene Investigation	3.328	CTV
December 13-December 19	CSI: Miami	2.509	CTV
December 20-December 27	The Amazing Race	2.017	CTV
December 28-January 2	My Big Fat Greek Wedding	1.958	CBC
January 3-January 9	2005 World Junior Ice Hockey Championships	3.387	TSN
January 10-January 16	CSI: Crime Scene Investigation	3.138	CTV
January 17-January 23	American Idol 4	2.816	CTV
January 24-January 30	American Idol 4	2.863	CTV
January 31-February 6	American Idol 4	3.272	CTV
February 7-February 13	CSI: Crime Scene Investigation	3.258	CTV
February 14-February 2O	Survivor: Palau	3.258	Global
February 21-February 27	77th Academy Awards	5.266	CTV
February 28-March 6	The Amazing Race	2.926	CTV
March 7-March 13	CSI: Crime Scene Investigation	3.192	CTV
March 14-March 20	The Amazing Race	3.043	CTV
March 21-March 27	The Amazing Race	2.939	CTV
March 28-April 3	Survivor: Palau	3.265	Global
April 4-April 10	The Amazing Race	3.406	CTV
April 11-April 17	Survivor: Palau	3.385	Global
April 18-April 24	Survivor: Palau	3.395	Global
April 25-May 1	The Amazing Race	3.331	CTV
May 2-May 8	The Amazing Race	3.270	CTV
May 9-May 15	The Amazing Race	3.836	CTV
May 16-May 22	CSI: Crime Scene Investigation	3.843	CTV
May 23-May 29	American Idol 4	3.450	CTV
May 30-June 5	Canadian Idol 3	2.080	CTV
June 6-June 12	Canadian Idol 3	2.179	CTV
June 13-June 19	Canadian Idol 3	2.287	CTV
June 20-June 26	Canadian Idol 3	2.084	CTV
June 27-July 3	Canadian Idol 3	1.739	CTV
July 4-July 10	Canadian Idol 3	1.897	CTV
July 11-July 17	Canadian Idol 3	1.796	CTV
July 18-July 24	Canadian Idol 3	2.108	CTV
July 25-July 31	Canadian Idol 3	2.079	CTV
August 1-August 7	Canadian Idol 3	2.048	CTV
August 8-August 14	Canadian Idol 3	2.098	CTV
August 15-August 21	Canadian Idol 3	2.321	CTV
August 22-August 28	Canadian Idol 3	2.144	CTV
