= Le Grand Journal =

Le Grand Journal may refer to:

- Le Grand Journal (Canadian TV program), a 1989–2008 Canadian news television program
- Le Grand Journal (French TV program), a 2004–2017 French news and talk television program
