= 2000–01 Canadian network television schedule =

The 2000–01 Canadian network television schedule indicates the fall prime time schedules for Canada's major English broadcast networks. For schedule changes after the fall launch, please consult each network's individual article.

== 2000 official fall schedule ==
Note: Canadian content programs in the tables have a	red	highlight.

=== Sunday ===
PM	7:00	7:30	8:00	8:30	9:00	9:30	10:00	10:30
CBC	Wind at My Back		Specials				CBC News: Sunday Night	Venture
CTV	News	Jeopardy!	Who Wants to Be a Millionaire?		CTV Sunday Movie			
Global	Futurama	King of the Hill	The Simpsons	Malcolm in the Middle	The X-Files		The Practice	

=== Monday ===
PM	7:00	7:30	8:00	8:30	9:00	9:30	10:00	10:30
CBC	Royal Canadian Air Farce	It's a Living	This Hour Has 22 Minutes	Made in Canada	P.R.	Drop the Beat	The National	
CTV	Wheel of Fortune	Jeopardy!	Daddio	The Michael Richards Show	Ally McBeal		Third Watch	
Global	News	Entertainment Tonight	Boston Public		Deadline		Cover Me	

=== Tuesday ===
PM	7:00	7:30	8:00	8:30	9:00	9:30	10:00	10:30
CBC	Life & Times		Marketplace	Venture	Witness		The National	
CTV	Wheel of Fortune	Jeopardy!	Who Wants to Be a Millionaire?		The Drew Carey Show	The Geena Davis Show	Once and Again	
Global	News	Entertainment Tonight	That '70s Show	Dharma & Greg	Frasier	Frasier (second episode)	Bob & Margaret	Two Guys and a Girl

=== Wednesday ===
PM	7:00	7:30	8:00	8:30	9:00	9:30	10:00	10:30
CBC	On the Road Again	Canada	The Fifth Estate		Da Vinci's Inquest		The National	
CTV	Wheel of Fortune	Jeopardy!	Who Wants to Be a Millionaire?		The West Wing		Law & Order	
Global	News	Entertainment Tonight	Malcolm in the Middle	Normal, Ohio	The $treet		Gilmore Girls	

=== Thursday ===
PM	7:00	7:30	8:00	8:30	9:00	9:30	10:00	10:30
CBC	Pelswick	Our Hero	The Nature of Things		Specials		The National	
CTV	Wheel of Fortune	Jeopardy!	Whose Line Is It Anyway?	Whose Line Is It Anyway?	Who Wants to Be a Millionaire?		ER	
Global	News	Entertainment Tonight	Friends	Cursed	Will & Grace	Just Shoot Me!	The Outer Limits	

=== Friday ===
PM	7:00	7:30	8:00	8:30	9:00	9:30	10:00	10:30
CBC	This Hour Has 22 Minutes	Just for Laughs	Royal Canadian Air Farce	The Red Green Show	These Arms of Mine		The National	
CTV	Wheel of Fortune	Jeopardy!	The Fugitive		Cold Squad		CSI: Crime Scene Investigation	
Global	News	Entertainment Tonight	Dawson's Creek		FreakyLinks		20/20	

=== Saturday ===
PM	7:00	7:30	8:00	8:30	9:00	9:30	10:00	10:30
CBC	Hockey Night in Canada							
CTV	News	eNOW	Twice in a Lifetime		Various		Comedy repeats	
Global	Queen of Swords		That's Life		Andromeda		PSI Factor: Chronicles of the Paranormal	
