= 2005–06 Canadian network television schedule =

The 2005–06 Canadian network television schedule indicates the fall prime time schedules for Canada's major English broadcast networks. For schedule changes after the fall launch, please consult each network's individual article.

The CBC fall schedule was delayed because of the "CBC" lockout which ended in October.

Canadian content shows in the tables have a	red	highlight.

== 2005 official fall schedule ==
=== Sunday ===
PM	7:00	7:30	8:00	8:30	9:00	9:30	10:00	10:30
CBC	Marketplace	Venture	Movies & Specials				CBC News: Sunday Night	
CTV	Law and Order: Criminal Intent		Cold Case		Desperate Housewives		Grey's Anatomy	
Global	Malcolm in the Middle	King of the Hill	The Simpsons	The War at Home	Family Guy	American Dad!	Crossing Jordan	
A-Channel
Citytv
CH

=== Monday ===
PM	7:00	7:30	8:00	8:30	9:00	9:30	10:00	10:30
CBC	Royal Canadian Air Farce	Coronation Street	(to be confirmed)	The Tournament	The Nature of Things		The National	
CTV	eTalk	Jeopardy!	Corner Gas	Degrassi: The Next Generation	Medium		CSI: Miami	
Global	ET Canada	Entertainment Tonight	Arrested Development	Kitchen Confidential	Prison Break		The Closer	

=== Tuesday ===
PM	7:00	7:30	8:00	8:30	9:00	9:30	10:00	10:30
CBC	This Hour Has 22 Minutes	Coronation Street	Rick Mercer Report	Just for Laughs	Da Vinci's City Hall		The National	
CTV	eTalk	Jeopardy!	Close to Home		The Amazing Race		Law & Order: Special Victims Unit	
Global	ET Canada	Entertainment Tonight	Bones		House		Fear Factor	

=== Wednesday ===
PM	7:00	7:30	8:00	8:30	9:00	9:30	10:00	10:30
CBC	Rick Mercer Report	Coronation Street	This Is Wonderland		The Fifth Estate		The National	
CTV	eTalk	Jeopardy!	Invasion		Lost		CSI: NY	
Global	ET Canada	Entertainment Tonight	E-Ring		The Apprentice: Martha Stewart		ReGenesis	

=== Thursday ===
PM	7:00	7:30	8:00	8:30	9:00	9:30	10:00	10:30
CBC	Canadian Antiques Roadshow	Coronation Street	Life and Times		The Passionate Eye		The National	
CTV	eTalk	Jeopardy!	Criminal Minds		CSI		ER	
Global	ET Canada	Entertainment Tonight	Survivor: Cook Islands		The Apprentice		Without a Trace	

=== Friday ===
PM	7:00	7:30	8:00	8:30	9:00	9:30	10:00	10:30
CBC	On the Road Again	Coronation Street	Royal Canadian Air Farce	This Hour Has 22 Minutes	The Red Green Show	Just For Laughs Gags	The National	
CTV	eTalk	Jeopardy!	Ghost Whisperer		Law and Order		The O.C	
Global	ET Canada	Entertainment Tonight	Next Great Chef	Next Great Chef	Trading Spouses		Numb3rs	
A-Channel
Citytv
CH

=== Saturday ===
PM	7:00	7:30	8:00	8:30	9:00	9:30	10:00	10:30
CBC	Hockey Night in Canada							
CTV	W-FIVE		Crimetime Saturday		Nip/Tuck		The Sopranos	
Global	Global Currents		Blue Murder		Zoe Busiek: Wild Card		Code Name: Eternity	

== Top weekly ratings ==
- Note: English Canadian television only by viewers age 2 and up
- "official website". BBM Canada. Archived from the original on December 8, 2009.

Week	Name	Viewers (in millions)	Network
August 29-September 4	Canadian Idol 3	2.537	CTV
September 5-September 11	Canadian Idol 3	2.522	CTV
September 12-September 18	Survivor: Guatemala	3.378	Global
September 19-September 25	CSI: Crime Scene Investigation	3.353	CTV
September 26-October 2	CSI: Crime Scene Investigation	3.336	CTV
October 3-October 9	CSI: Crime Scene Investigation	3.301	CTV
October 10-October 16	CSI: Crime Scene Investigation	3.192	CTV
October 17-October 23	CSI:Crime Scene Investigation	3.208	CTV
October 24-October 30	Survivor: Guatemala	2.828	Global
October 31-November 6	CSI:Crime Scene Investigation	3.297	CTV
November 7-November 13	CSI:Crime Scene Investigation	3.295	CTV
November 14-November 20	CSI: Crime Scene Investigation	3.355	CTV
November 21-November 27	CSI: Crime Scene Investigation	3.053	CTV
November 28-December 4	Survivor: Guatemala	3.177	Global
December 5-December 11	CSI: Crime Scene Investigation	3.180	CTV
December 12-December 18	The Amazing Race	2.655	CTV
December 19-December 25	CSI: Miami	2.504	CTV
December 26-January 1	CSI: Crime Scene Investigation	1.935	CTV
January 2-January 8	CSI: Crime Scene Investigation	2.709	CTV
January 9-January 15	Desperate Housewives	2.391	CTV
January 16-January 22	CSI: Crime Scene Investigation	3.237	CTV
January 23-January 29	American Idol	3.332	CTV
January 30-February 5	Super Bowl	3.960	Global
February 6-February 12	CSI: Crime Scene Investigation	3.452	CTV
February 13-February 19	American Idol 5	2.973	CTV
February 20-February 26	American Idol 5	3.229	CTV
February 27-March 5	78th Academy Awards	5.104	CTV
March 6-March 12	CSI: Crime Scene Investigation	3.508	CTV
March 13-March 19	American Idol 5	3.407	CTV
March 20-March 26	American Idol 5	3.098	CTV
March 27-April 2	CSI: Crime Scene Investigation	3.448	CTV
April 3-April 9	American Idol 5	3.093	CTV
April 3-April 9	American Idol 5	3.093	CTV
April 10-April 16	American Idol 5	3.414	CTV
April 17-April 23	American Idol 5	3.209	CTV
April 24-April 30	CSI: Crime Scene Investigation	3.179	CTV
May 1-May 7	CSI: Crime Scene Investigation	3.221	CTV
May 8-May 14	American Idol 5	3.015	CTV
May 15-May 21	American Idol 5	3.151	CTV
May 22-May 28	American Idol 5	3.879	CTV
May 29-June 4	Canadian Idol	1.696	CTV
June 5-June 11	2006 Stanley Cup Playoffs	2.794	CBC
June 12-June 18	2006 Stanley Cup Playoffs	3.529	CBC
June 19-June 25	2006 Stanley Cup Playoffs	4.673	CBC
June 26-July 2	Canadian Idol 4	1.872	CTV
July 3-July 9	2006 FIFA World Cup	2.408	CTV
July 10-July 16	America's Got Talent	1.683	CTV
July 17-July 23	Canadian Idol 4	2.155	CTV
July 24-July 30	Canadian Idol 4	1.956	CTV
July 31-August 6	Canadian Idol 4	1.911	CTV
August 7-August 13	Canadian Idol 4	1.945	CTV
August 14-August 20	Canadian Idol 4	2.248	CTV
August 21-August 27	Canadian Idol 4	2.009	CTV
