= ERBOL =

Bolivian broadcast network

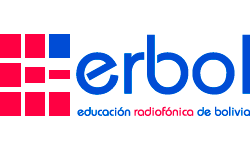
- Type: Broadcast network and news agency
- Country: Bolivia
- Founded: 18 July 1967; 59 years ago
- Headquarters: Calle Ballivián 1323, La Paz
- Official website: erbol.com.bo

Educational Radio of Bolivia (Spanish: Educación Radiofónica de Bolivia; ERBOL) is a La Paz-based non-profit broadcast network and news agency made up some 170 community radio stations in Bolivia and abroad. Founded on 18 July 1967 as Radio Schools of Bolivia (Spanish: Escuelas Radiofónicas de Bolivia) by five Catholic radios, it provides popular education and religious broadcasting, and promotes literacy among indigenous and peasant communities. It later grew into a national news outlet and is one of Bolivia's most influential networks.
