= 2018–19 Canadian network television schedule =

The 2018–19 network television schedule for the five major English commercial broadcast networks in Canada covers primetime hours from September 2018 through August 2019. The schedule is followed by a list per network of returning series, new series, and series canceled after the 2017–18 television season, for Canadian, American and other series.

CBC Television was first to announce its fall schedule on May 24, 2018, followed by Global on June 4, Citytv on June 5, and CTV and CTV 2 on June 7, 2018. As in the past, the commercial networks' announcements come shortly after the networks have had a chance to buy Canadian rights to new American series. CTV 2 and Global are not included on Saturday as they normally only schedule encore programming in primetime on Saturdays.

== Legend ==
Light blue indicates Local Programming.
Grey indicates Encore Programming.
Light green indicates sporting events.
Red indicates Canadian content shows, which is programming that originated in Canada.
Magenta indicates series being burned off and other irregularly scheduled programs, including specials.
Cyan indicates various programming.
Light yellow indicates the current schedule.

== Schedule ==
- New series are highlighted in **bold**. Series that have changed network are not highlighted as new series.
- All times given are in Canadian Eastern Time and Pacific Time (except for some live events or specials, including most sports, which are given in Eastern Time).

=== Sunday ===
Network		7:00 PM	7:30 PM	8:00 PM	8:30 PM	9:00 PM	9:30 PM	10:00 PM	10:30 PM
CBC	Fall	Anne		The Nature of Things		The Fifth Estate		The National	
CBC	Winter	Heartland		The Nature of Things		The Fifth Estate		The National	
Citytv		CityNews		The Simpsons	Bob's Burgers	Family Guy	**Rel**	Encore Programming	
CTV	Fall	NFL overrun (continued to game completion)	SportsCentre	**God Friended Me**		Shark Tank		**The Alec Baldwin Show**	
CTV	Spring	**God Friended Me**		World of Dance				**The Enemy Within**	
CTV 2	Fall	The Big Bang Theory (R)	The Big Bang Theory (R)	Football Night in America (joined in progress)	Sunday Night Football (continued to game completion)				
CTV 2	Spring	World of Dance		American Idol				Shark Tank	
Global	Fall	Border Security: Canada's Front Line		**Dancing with the Stars: Juniors**		NCIS: Los Angeles		Madam Secretary	
Global	Winter	Border Security: Canada's Front Line		SEAL Team		NCIS: Los Angeles		Madam Secretary	
Global	Summer	Border Security: Canada's Front Line		Mary Kills People		The Good Fight (R)		S.W.A.T. (R)	
Global	Summer	Border Security: Canada's Front Line		Mary Kills People		Instinct		The Good Fight (R)	

=== Monday ===
Network		8:00 PM	8:30 PM	9:00 PM	9:30 PM	10:00 PM	10:30 PM
CBC	Fall	Murdoch Mysteries		Frankie Drake Mysteries		The National	
CBC	Winter	Murdoch Mysteries		**Coroner**		The National	
Citytv	Fall	Dancing with the Stars				**Manifest**	
Citytv	Winter	The Bachelor				**Manifest**	
Citytv	Spring	**Hudson & Rex**		**The Murders**		Dancing with the Stars (R)	
Citytv	Summer	The Bachelorette				**Paradise Hotel**	
CTV	Fall	The Resident		**Magnum P.I.**		The Good Doctor	
CTV	Spring	The Resident		MasterChef Canada		**The Fix**	
CTV 2	Fall	The Voice				The Goldbergs (R)	Seinfeld (R)
CTV 2	Winter	**America's Got Talent: The Champions**				The Goldbergs (R)	Seinfeld (R)
CTV 2	Late winter	The Voice				The Goldbergs (R)	Seinfeld (R)
Global	Fall	**The Neighborhood**	**Happy Together**	9-1-1		Bull	
Global	Early Winter	**The Neighborhood**	**Happy Together**	NCIS: New Orleans		Bull	
Global	Follow-up	Celebrity Big Brother		NCIS: New Orleans		Bull	
Global	Winter	**The Neighborhood**	Man with a Plan	Celebrity Big Brother		Bull	

=== Tuesday ===
Network		8:00 PM	8:30 PM	9:00 PM	9:30 PM	10:00 PM	10:30 PM
CBC	Fall	Still Standing	22 Minutes	Baroness von Sketch Show		The National	
CBC	Winter	Kim's Convenience	22 Minutes	Schitt's Creek	**Cavendish**	The National	
Citytv	Fall	The Gifted		Lethal Weapon		Encore Programming	
Citytv	Winter	Lethal Weapon		The Gifted		Encore Programming	
Citytv	Spring	The Gifted (R)		Mental Samurai		Encore Programming	
Citytv	Summer	America's Got Talent		**Songland**		**Catch-22**	
CTV	Fall	The Conners	**The Kids Are Alright**	This Is Us		**The Rookie**	
CTV	Winter	Ellen's Game of Games		This Is Us		**The Rookie**	
CTV	Mid-spring	Ellen's Game of Games		**The Village**		**The Rookie**	
CTV	Late-spring	**The Village**		The Voice		The Big Bang Theory (R)	The Big Bang Theory (R)
CTV 2		The Voice		The Big Bang Theory (R)	Splitting Up Together	The Goldbergs (R)	Seinfeld (R)
Global	Fall/Winter	NCIS		**FBI**		**New Amsterdam**	
Global	Summer	NCIS (R)		FBI (R)		**Blood & Treasure**	

=== Wednesday ===
Network		8:00 PM	8:30 PM	9:00 PM	9:30 PM	10:00 PM	10:30 PM
CBC	Fall	The Great Canadian Baking Show		**Vanity Fair**		The National	
CBC	Late Fall	**Canada's Smartest Person Junior**		Mr. D	Halifax Comedy Festival	The National	
CBC	Winter	Burden of Truth		**Unspeakable**		The National	
Citytv	Fall	Black-ish	**The Cool Kids**	Modern Family	**Single Parents**	**A Million Little Things**	
Citytv	Late Fall	Black-ish	Modern Family (R)	Modern Family	**Single Parents**	**A Million Little Things**	
Citytv	Winter	Black-ish	**The Cool Kids**	Modern Family	**Single Parents**	Encore Programming	
Citytv	Spring	Life in Pieces	**The Cool Kids**	Modern Family	**Single Parents**	Encore Programming	
CTV	Fall	The Goldbergs	American Housewife	Grey's Anatomy		Criminal Minds	
CTV	Late winter	The Goldbergs	**Jann**	Grey's Anatomy		**Whiskey Cavalier**	
CTV	Spring	Grey's Anatomy		The Amazing Race		**Whiskey Cavalier**	
CTV 2		Carter (R)		The Detail (R)		The Goldbergs (R)	Seinfeld (R)
Global	Fall	Survivor: David vs. Goliath		SEAL Team		Chicago P.D.	
Global	Early Winter	Chicago Med		Chicago Fire		Chicago P.D.	
Global	Follow-up	Celebrity Big Brother		Chicago Fire		Chicago P.D.	
Global	Winter	Survivor: Edge of Extinction		Chicago Fire		Chicago P.D.	
Global	Summer	Big Brother		Private Eyes		**The InBetween**	
Global	Summer	Big Brother		**BH90210**		**The InBetween**	

=== Thursday ===
Network		8:00 PM	8:30 PM	9:00 PM	9:30 PM	10:00 PM	10:30 PM
CBC	Fall	Dragons' Den		The Detectives		The National	
CBC	Winter	Dragons' Den		Workin' Moms	Little Dog	The National	
Citytv	Fall	Bad Blood		Mom	Murphy Brown	Encore Programming	
Citytv	Winter	Mom	Brooklyn Nine-Nine	The Orville		**A Million Little Things**	
Citytv	Spring	Mom	Brooklyn Nine-Nine	The Orville		**The Twilight Zone**	
CTV	Fall	The Big Bang Theory	Young Sheldon	Station 19		Law & Order: Special Victims Unit	
CTV	Winter	The Big Bang Theory	Young Sheldon	Cardinal		Law & Order: Special Victims Unit	
CTV	Late winter	The Big Bang Theory	Young Sheldon	Station 19		Law & Order: Special Victims Unit	
CTV 2	Fall	Thursday Night Football Pregame Show (7:30 p.m. ET)	Thursday Night Football (continued to game completion)				
CTV 2	Winter	Gotham		The Resident (R)		How to Get Away with Murder	
CTV 2	Late winter	Gotham		The Resident (R)		For the People	
Global	Fall	Superstore	The Good Place	Will & Grace	**I Feel Bad**	S.W.A.T.	
Global	Early Winter	**The Titan Games**		**Schooled**	The Good Place	S.W.A.T.	
Global	Winter	**The Titan Games**		**Schooled**	Will & Grace	S.W.A.T.	
Global	Summer	**Holey Moley**		Big Brother		Elementary	

=== Friday ===
Network		8:00 PM	8:30 PM	9:00 PM	9:30 PM	10:00 PM	10:30 PM
CBC	Fall	Marketplace	**In the Making**	Firsthand		The National	
CBC	Winter	Marketplace	The Stats of Life	CBC Docs POV		The National	
Citytv	Fall	**The Bletchley Circle: San Francisco**		Hell's Kitchen		Encore Programming	
Citytv	Late Fall	Modern Family (R)	**The Cool Kids**	Hell's Kitchen		Encore Programming	
Citytv	Winter	**The Bletchley Circle: San Francisco**		Hell's Kitchen		Encore Programming	
CTV	Fall	Blindspot		How to Get Away with Murder		Blue Bloods	
CTV	Winter	Blindspot		American Housewife	**The Kids Are Alright**	Blue Bloods	
CTV 2		CTV Movie				The Goldbergs (R)	Seinfeld (R)
Global	Fall	MacGyver		Hawaii Five-0		Chicago Fire	
Global	Winter	MacGyver		Hawaii Five-0		The Blacklist	

=== Saturday ===
Network	7:00 PM	7:30 PM	8:00 PM	8:30 PM	9:00 PM	9:30 PM	10:00 PM	10:30 PM
CBC	Hockey Night in Canada (doubleheader game 1)						Hockey Night in Canada (doubleheader game 2; continued to game completion)	
Citytv	Hockey Night in Canada						Encore Programming	
CTV	W5		CTV Movie				The Big Bang Theory (R)	The Big Bang Theory (R)
Global	Encore Programming		Chicago Med		Encore Programming			

== By network ==
=== CBC Television ===
Returning series:

- 22 Minutes
- Anne
- Back in Time for Winter
- Baroness von Sketch Show
- Battle of the Blades
- Burden of Truth
- Catastrophe
- The Detectives
- Diggstown
- Dragons' Den
- The Fifth Estate
- Fortunate Son
- Frankie Drake Mysteries
- The Great Canadian Baking Show
- Heartland
- High Arctic Haulers
- Hockey Night in Canada (shared with Citytv)
- Little Dog
- Kim's Convenience
- Marketplace
- Murdoch Mysteries
- The National
- The Nature of Things
- Schitt's Creek
- Still Standing
- Vanity Fair
- Workin' Moms

New series:

- Canada's Smartest Person Junior
- Coroner
- Cavendish
- In the Making
- Unspeakable

Not returning from 2017-18:

- Caught
- Unspeakable
- Rick Mercer Report
- Versailles

=== Citytv ===
Returning series:

- America's Got Talent
- Bad Blood
- The Bachelor
- The Bachelorette
- Black-ish
- Bob's Burgers
- Brooklyn Nine-Nine
- Dancing with the Stars
- Family Guy
- The Gifted (moved from CTV)
- Hell's Kitchen
- Hockey Night in Canada (shared with CBC)
- Lethal Weapon
- Life in Pieces
- Modern Family
- Mom
- Murphy Brown
- The Orville
- The Simpsons (moved from Global)

New series:

- The Bletchley Circle: San Francisco
- The Cool Kids
- Catch-22
- Hudson & Rex
- Manifest
- A Million Little Things
- Paradise Hotel
- Rel
- Single Parents
- Songland
- The Twilight Zone

Not returning from 2017-18:

- The Blacklist (moved to Global)
- Fubar: The Age of the Computer
- Ghosted
- LA to Vegas
- The Last Man on Earth
- Little Big Shots (returned for 2019-20)
- The Mick
- The Middle
- The Mindy Project
- New Girl
- Nirvanna the Band the Show
- The Resident (moved to CTV)
- Scorpion
- Speechless

=== CTV/CTV 2 ===
Returning series:

- Agents of S.H.I.E.L.D.
- The Amazing Race Canada
- The Amazing Race USA
- American Housewife
- American Idol
- American Ninja Warrior
- The Big Bang Theory
- Blue Bloods
- Blindspot
- Cardinal
- Criminal Minds
- Ellen's Game of Games
- etalk
- Football Night in America
- For the People
- The Goldbergs
- Gotham
- The Good Doctor
- Grey's Anatomy
- How to Get Away with Murder
- The Launch
- Law & Order: Special Victims Unit
- MasterChef Canada
- MasterChef Junior
- NBC Sunday Night Football
- NFL GameDay
- NFL on Fox
- The Resident (moved from Citytv)
- Station 19
- Shark Tank
- SportsCentre
- The Voice
- This Is Us
- Thursday Night Football
- W5
- World of Dance
- Young Sheldon

New series:

- America's Got Talent: The Champions
- The Alec Baldwin Show
- The Conners
- The Enemy Within
- The Fix
- God Friended Me
- Jann
- The Kids Are Alright
- Magnum P.I
- The Rookie
- The Village
- Whiskey Cavalier

Not returning from 2017-18:

- Alex, Inc
- Arrow (moved to CTV Sci-Fi Channel)
- Code Black
- The Crossing
- The Detail
- Designated Survivor (moved to Netflix)
- The Disappearance
- The Exorcist
- The Flash (moved to Netflix)
- The Gifted (moved to Citytv)
- The Indian Detective
- Inhumans
- Kevin (Probably) Saves the World
- Legends of Tomorrow (moved to CTV Sci-Fi Channel)
- Living Biblically
- Lucifer (moved to Netflix)
- The Mayor
- Once Upon a Time
- Quantico
- Roseanne

=== Global ===
Returning series:

- 9-1-1
- Big Brother USA
- Big Brother Canada
- The Blacklist (moved from Citytv)
- Bull
- Celebrity Big Brother
- Chicago Fire
- Chicago Med
- Chicago P.D.
- Elementary
- Entertainment Tonight
- Entertainment Tonight Canada
- The Good Place
- Hawaii Five-0
- Instinct
- MacGyver
- Madam Secretary
- Man with a Plan
- NCIS
- NCIS: Los Angeles
- NCIS: New Orleans
- Private Eyes
- SEAL Team
- Superstore
- Survivor
- S.W.A.T.
- Will & Grace

New series:

- BH90210
- Blood & Treasure
- Dancing with the Stars: Juniors
- FBI
- I Feel Bad
- Happy Together
- Holey Moley
- The InBetween
- The Neighborhood
- New Amsterdam
- Schooled
- The Titan Games

Not returning from 2017-18:

- 9JKL
- The Brave
- Great News
- Kevin Can Wait
- Law & Order: True Crime
- Superior Donuts
- The Simpsons (moved to Citytv)
- Timeless
- Wisdom of the Crowd

=== Cancellations/series endings ===
==== Global ====
- Mary Kills People—Series Finale on June 16, 2019, after three seasons.

== See also ==
- 2018–19 United States network television schedule
