= Patrick Masbourian =

Canadian coordinator and director (born 1969)

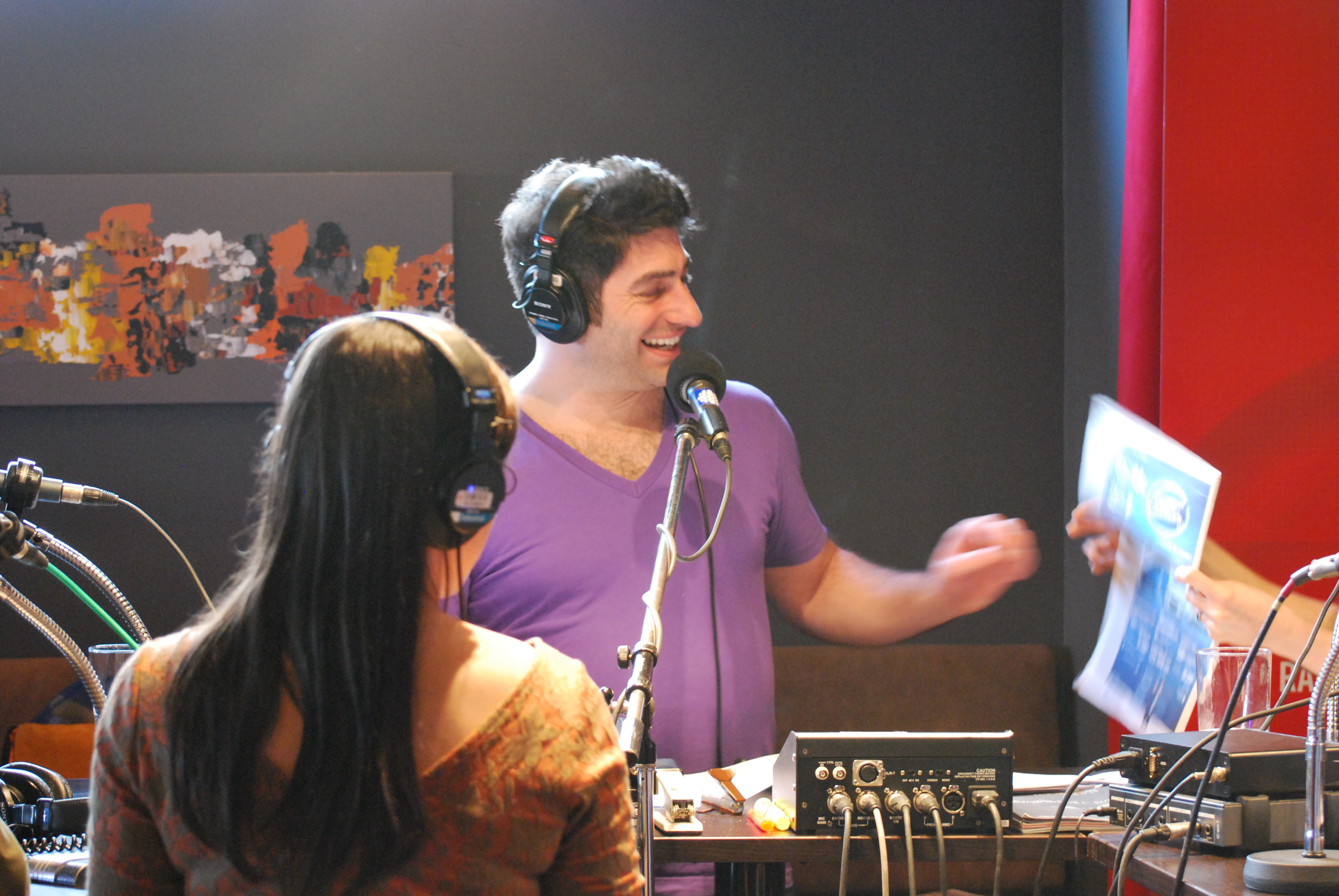

Patrick Masbourian is a Canadian coordinator and director. He was born on December 4, 1969, in the United States to Armenian parents. He began his television career while participating in La Course destination monde, a transmission of the Télévision de Radio-Canada to give a chance to young reporters and cameramen to prepare international reports. Masbourian won the 3rd prize in the 1990–1991 season, in the competition Europe-Asia.

He joined Marc Labrèche program La Fin du monde est à 7 heures in 1997 and continued to co-host until 2000 when he became presenter of "La revanche des Nerdz", a daily program on Z-Télé for until 2006 when François-Étienne Paré replaced him.

In 2004, he participated in the Armenian genocide documentary My Son Shall Be Armenian.

In summer 2006, Masbourian replaced Marie-France Bazzo on the morning show of Radio-Canada's 1st channel called "Pour la suite des choses" in the 9:00 to 11:30 am time slot.

In spring 2007, he presented "Radiomonde" (broadcast 28 April to 2 June 2007 and rebroadcast 8 July to 12 August) in collaboration with Canadian International Development Agency (CIDA).

As of 2011 Masbourian was working in personal projects projets related to the cinema, and continued filing reports in "Flash".

Beginning in 2008 he presented "Vous êtes ici" on Radio-Canada, from Mondays to Thursday at 8:00 pm. Since July 2010 he collaborated on "L'après-midi porte conseil" with its "La démission du consommateur" on Radio-Canada.

During the summer of 2011 he presented "PM" on Radio-Canada.

Other presentations include L'été en ville, Alimentaire, mon cher Watson, Bêtes pas bêtes (directing) and Flash.

On May 7, it was announced that he will host the new morning show for greater Montreal on ICI Radio-Canada Première starting fall 2019.
