= André Corriveau (filmmaker) =

Canadian film director and editor

André Corriveau (French pronunciation: [ɑ̃dʁe kɔʁivo]) is a film editor and director from Quebec, Canada. Corriveau won the Gemini Awards once (1994), and the Genie Award twice (1981 and 1985). In addition to the wins, he has one nomination to the Gemini Awards, six nominations to the Genie Awards, and one nomination to the Jutra Awards.

His editing credits include the 2004 documentary My Son Shall Be Armenian.
