= 1999–2000 Canadian network television schedule =

The 1999–2000 Canadian network television schedule indicates the fall prime time schedules for Canada's major English broadcast networks. For schedule changes after the fall launch, please consult each network's individual article.

== 1999 official fall schedule ==
Note: Canadian content programs in the tables have a	red	highlight.

=== Sunday ===
PM	7:00	7:30	8:00	8:30	9:00	9:30	10:00	10:30
CBC	Wind at My Back		CBC Sunday Movie					
CTV	Felicity		Third Watch		CTV Sunday Movie			
Global	60 Minutes		The Simpsons	Futurama	The X-Files		The Practice	

=== Monday ===
PM	7:00	7:30	8:00	8:30	9:00	9:30	10:00	10:30
CBC	Royal Canadian Air Farce	On the Road Again	This Hour Has 22 Minutes	Made in Canada	The Nature of Things		The National	
CTV	Wheel of Fortune	Jeopardy!	Suddenly Susan	Veronica's Closet	Ally McBeal		Law & Order: Special Victims Unit	
Global	News	Entertainment Tonight	Time of Your Life		Dawson's Creek		Party of Five	

=== Tuesday ===
PM	7:00	7:30	8:00	8:30	9:00	9:30	10:00	10:30
CBC	The Red Green Show	Pit Pony	Marketplace	Venture	Life and Times		The National	
CTV	Wheel of Fortune	Jeopardy!	Spin City	It's Like, You Know	The West Wing		Once and Again	
Global	News	Entertainment Tonight	3rd Rock from the Sun	That '70s Show	Dharma & Greg	Bob & Margaret	Action	Frasier

=== Wednesday ===
PM	7:00	7:30	8:00	8:30	9:00	9:30	10:00	10:30
CBC	Comics!	Canada	The Fifth Estate		Da Vinci's Inquest		The National	
CTV	Wheel of Fortune	Jeopardy!	Two Guys, a Girl and a Pizza Place	The Norm Show	The Drew Carey Show	Oh, Grow Up	Law & Order	
Global	News	Entertainment Tonight	Beverly Hills, 90210		Get Real		Chicago Hope	

=== Thursday ===
PM	7:00	7:30	8:00	8:30	9:00	9:30	10:00	10:30
CBC	Riverdale		Witness		Rock Choral		The National	
CTV	Wheel of Fortune	Jeopardy!	Roswell		Charmed		ER	
Global	News	Entertainment Tonight	Friends	Jesse	Frasier	Stark Raving Mad	Traders	

=== Friday ===
PM	7:00	7:30	8:00	8:30	9:00	9:30	10:00	10:30
CBC	This Hour Has 22 Minutes	Just for Laughs	Royal Canadian Air Farce	The Red Green Show	Nothing Too Good for a Cowboy		The National	
CTV	Wheel of Fortune	Jeopardy!	Power Play		Charmed		Cold Squad	
Global	News	Entertainment Tonight	Ryan Caulfield: Year One		Harsh Realm		20/20	

=== Saturday ===
PM	7:00	7:30	8:00	8:30	9:00	9:30	10:00	10:30
CBC	Hockey Night in Canada							
CTV	CTV Saturday Movie				America's Most Wanted		Snoops	
Global	The Outer Limits		Family Guy	King of the Hill	Jack and Jill		Any Day Now	
