= Jean-Luc Mongrain =

Canadian journalist, television host and news anchor (1951–2026)

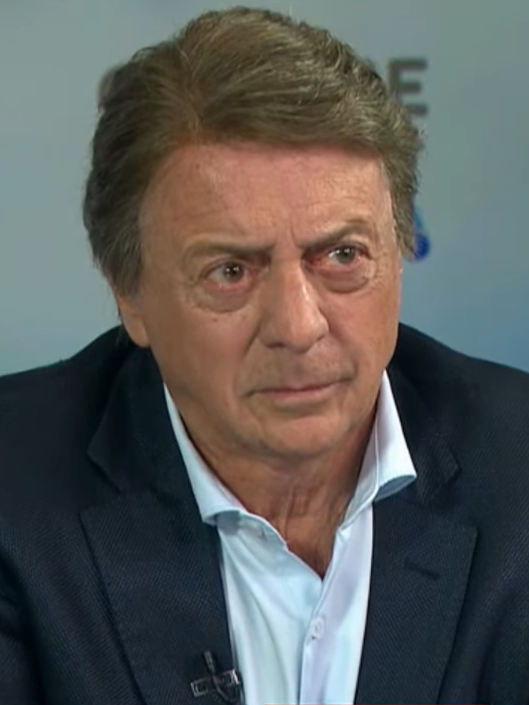
- Mongrain in 2025
- Born: July 16, 1951; Sherbrooke, Quebec, Canada
- Died: October 11, 2026 (aged 75); Quebec, Canada
- Education: Université de Sherbrooke
- Occupations: Journalist, news presenter

Jean-Luc Mongrain (July 16, 1951 – October 11, 2026) was a Canadian journalist, television host and news anchor. He was the news anchor of his own show called Mongrain on LCN (owned by the TVA network) until 2012.

== Early life and education ==
Mongrain was born in Sherbrooke, Quebec on July 16, 1951. He studied at the Université de Sherbrooke and earned a bachelor's degree in theology in 1975. Prior to that, he was a businessman at the age of 9 when he owned a small snack shop near a construction site.

== Career ==
Mongrain started his journalism career in 1974 when he hosted public affairs shows on the radio and later in 1986 on television. He was also a journalist at a local radio station in Sherbrooke.

In 1986, he worked as a journalist and a host at the TVA television network, first in Sherbrooke and then in Montreal. During the same year he hosted a public affairs show called L'Heure juste, and was an editor of a magazine called Dernière Heure.

In 1982, he founded a local newspaper, La Nouvelle, which was acquired by Paul Desmarais's Power Corporation and renamed La Tribune. For nearly 10 years he hosted his own show called Mongrain de sel, where he gave up his view and commentary of the news along with some interviews. He also briefly worked at Télé-Québec, the province's public television network.

In 1999, Mongrain joined the TQS television network, becoming the news anchor of Le Grand Journal. Mongrain stepped down as anchor for TQS in May 2008, following the sale of the network to Remstar.

In March 2009, he joined LCN and to hosting a 90-minute talk show. Mongrain's show attracted up to 130,000 viewers and a 20% market share in its mid-afternoon spot on LCN.

Mongrain had wanted to have a similar program to Anderson Cooper 360° with more reporting from the field. LCN was not interested in this format and Mongrain indicated that he was not interested in renewing his contract. On April 12, 2012, LCN announced that Mongrain would be leaving LCN and would cease his column in Le Journal de Montréal at the end of May.

== Death ==
Mongrain died from cancer on October 11, 2026, at the age of 75.
