= Les Beaux Dimanches =

- Genre: arts
- Presented by: Henri Bergeron (1966-1983)
- Country of origin: Canada
- Original language: French

Original release
- Network: Radio-Canada
- Release: September 11, 1966 – August 8, 2004

Les Beaux Dimanches is a long-running Canadian television series, which aired on Télévision de Radio-Canada on Sunday nights from 1966 to 2004. An arts magazine and anthology series, Les Beaux Dimanches presented a diverse array of special cultural presentations, including theatrical plays, musical concerts, entertainment variety specials, film screenings and documentary specials on arts and cultural figures.

The series debuted on September 11, 1966, and was hosted by Henri Bergeron until 1983.

The final episode aired on August 8, 2004, and its timeslot was taken over by the talk show Tout le monde en parle.
