= La Fin du monde est à 7 heures =

- Starring: Marc Labrèche; Jean-René Dufort; Patrick Masbourian; Isabelle Maréchal; Paul Houde; Bruno Blanchet
- Country of origin: Canada
- No. of seasons: 3

Production
- Running time: 30 minutes

Original release
- Network: TQS
- Release: September 1, 1997 – April 28, 2000

La Fin du monde est à 7 heures ("The end of the world is at 7 o'clock") was a Quebec television comedy series, which aired on TQS from 1997 to 2000. The show was originally broadcast daily at 7 p.m., but was later moved to the 6 p.m. slot and ended its run in the 10 p.m. slot, with no name change. Although literally a reference to the program's original time slot, the title was also a pun; in spoken Quebec French, the pronunciation of à sept heures is virtually indistinguishable from à cette heure ("at this time" or "right now").

Hosted by Marc Labrèche, the program was a satirical take on news and current affairs. Similar in style to the English Canadian series This Hour Has 22 Minutes, the show mixed a mock newscast with satirical sketch comedy segments.

In addition to Labrèche, other personalities associated with the show include Jean-René Dufort, Manuel Foglia, Patrick Masbourian, Isabelle Maréchal, Paul Houde and Bruno Blanchet. The opening and closing music was the eponym song composed by Jean Leloup.

== Content ==
In the show's first episode, pollster Jean-Marc Léger of Léger Marketing polled 300 residents of Montreal to test the popularity of mayor Pierre Bourque, finding that Bourque would lose an election against media mogul Pierre Karl Péladeau or hockey player Jacques Lemaire, but would win against psychic JoJo Savard.

In a 1998 episode, Dufort successfully convinced former Montreal mayor Jean Doré to shave off his trademark moustache in exchange for a $1,000 donation to the Diabetic Children's Foundation. On the day of the 1998 provincial election, the show staged a prank in which a woman named Gertrude voted six different times at six different polling stations, leading to an investigation by the province's chief electoral officer; the program's election night special aired under the title La fin du monde est le 30 novembre.

In 1999, Dufort confronted Dorval mayor Peter Yeomans on his annual "Pothole Challenge", in which he would pay $6 to anyone who found a pothole in a city street before the city fixed it, by intentionally digging a pothole on avenue Claude. Later the same year, after Bloc Québécois Member of Parliament Suzanne Tremblay claimed in a speech that singer Céline Dion had turned her back on her Québécoise identity to chase pop stardom, the show interviewed Dion's sister, asking her three questions to determine whether Dion was still Québécoise: did she still like poutine, did she eat pâté chinois, and did she still swear in French when she banged her leg. Dion's sister answered yes to all three questions, so the show announced that Dion was still Québécoise after all.

Another recurring segment, appearing at the end of some but not all episodes, featured comedic weather reports delivered by a personality not normally associated with meteorology. During an appearance in this segment on October 28, 1998, Doré gave the weather forecast that there would be no snow that winter in Montreal wards where Équipe Montréal candidates were elected in the 1998 municipal election the following week. He was immediately pied by the Entartistes.

== Ending ==
The show ended in 2000, after Labrèche announced that he was leaving TQS to host a new talk show for TVA. Le Grand Blond avec un show sournois debuted in 2001. Dufort went on to host the Radio-Canada series Infoman.

== Awards ==
The series garnered eight Gémaux nominations in 1999 — including two separate nods for Labrèche as best host of a comedy series, once for the regular series and once for 30 novembre.

== See also ==
- List of satirical television news programs
