= Startv =

Startv is a Canadian weekly entertainment television program. It profiles Canadian actors, athletes, and musicians. The show debuted in September 1998 on Citytv Toronto.

The show is produced by Paul Boynett, Miriam Elmaleh, Penny Greenberg, Dan Hughes and Katie Lafferty

The editor is Andy Hamilton. Past editors have been Matthew Walsh and Richard Vandentillart
