= 2013–14 Canadian network television schedule =

The 2013–14 network television schedule for the five major English commercial broadcast networks in Canada covers primetime hours from September 2013 through August 2014. The schedule is followed by a list per network of returning series, new series, and series canceled after the 2012–13 television season, for Canadian, American and other series.

CTV Two and Global are not included on Saturday as they normally only schedule encore programming in primetime on Saturdays.

== Legend ==
Light blue indicates Local Programming.
Grey indicates Encore Programming.
Light green indicates sporting events.
Red indicates Canadian content shows, which is programming that originated in Canada.
Magenta indicates series being burned off and other irregularly scheduled programs, including specials.
Cyan indicates various programming.
Light yellow indicates the current schedule.

== Schedule ==
- New series are highlighted in **bold**. Series that have changed network are not highlighted as new series.
- All times given are in Canadian Eastern Time and Pacific Time (except for some live events or specials, including most sports, which are given in Eastern Time).

=== Sunday ===
Network		7:00 PM	7:30 PM	8:00 PM	8:30 PM	9:00 PM	9:30 PM	10:00 PM	10:30 PM
City		Encore Programming		Storage Wars Canada	**Meet the Family**	Revenge		**Betrayal**	
CTV	Fall	Once Upon a Time		The Amazing Race		Law & Order: Special Victims Unit		The Mentalist	
CTV Two	Fall	The Big Bang Theory (R)	Satisfaction	The Vampire Diaries		Castle		Mike & Molly (R)	Hot in Cleveland (R)
Global		Murder Police	**We Are Men**	The Simpsons	Bob's Burgers	Family Guy	American Dad!	The Good Wife	

=== Monday ===
Network		8:00 PM	8:30 PM	9:00 PM	9:30 PM	10:00 PM	10:30 PM
City		How I Met Your Mother	**Package Deal**	2 Broke Girls	**Mom**	**The Project: Guatemala**	
CTV	Fall	The Voice				**Hostages**	
CTV Two	Fall	Dancing with the Stars				Castle	
Global	Fall	Bones		**Sleepy Hollow**		**The Blacklist**	
Global	Late Fall	**Almost Human**		**Sleepy Hollow**		**The Blacklist**	

=== Tuesday ===
Network		8:00 PM	8:30 PM	9:00 PM	9:30 PM	10:00 PM	10:30 PM
City		**Dads**	**Brooklyn Nine-Nine**	New Girl	The Mindy Project	**Lucky 7**	
CTV	Fall	**Agents of S.H.I.E.L.D.**		**The Goldbergs**	**Trophy Wife**	Person of Interest (Note: New to CTV.)	
CTV Two	Fall	Anger Management	Hot in Cleveland	The Voice		Mike & Molly (R)	Hot in Cleveland (R)
Global		NCIS		NCIS: Los Angeles		Chicago Fire	

=== Wednesday ===
Network		8:00 PM	8:30 PM	9:00 PM	9:30 PM	10:00 PM	10:30 PM
City		Revolution		Modern Family	**Super Fun Night**	Nashville (Note: New to City.)	
CTV	Fall	Arrow		Criminal Minds		CSI: Crime Scene Investigation	
CTV Two	Fall	The X Factor				Mike & Molly (R)	Hot in Cleveland (R)
Global		Survivor		**Sean Saves the World**	**The Michael J. Fox Show**	**Ironside**	

Note: CTV aired The Tomorrow People at 7 p.m. during the fall.

=== Thursday ===
Network		8:00 PM	8:30 PM	9:00 PM	9:30 PM	10:00 PM	10:30 PM
City		**Once Upon a Time in Wonderland**		**The Crazy Ones**	Parks and Recreation	Scandal	
CTV	Fall	The Big Bang Theory	Two and a Half Men	Grey's Anatomy		**Played**	
CTV Two	Fall	The X Factor		**Reign**		Mike & Molly (R)	Hot in Cleveland (R)
Global		**Welcome to the Family**	**The Millers**	Glee		Elementary	

=== Friday ===
Network		8:00 PM	8:30 PM	9:00 PM	9:30 PM	10:00 PM	10:30 PM
City		The Carrie Diaries		Raising Hope	**Enlisted**	The Liquidator	The Liquidator
CTV	Fall	**MasterChef Junior**		Grimm		Blue Bloods	
CTV Two	Fall	Undercover Boss		Shark Tank		Mike & Molly (R)	Hot in Cleveland (R)
Global	Fall	Parenthood		Hawaii Five-0		**Dracula**	
Global	Late Fall	Bones		Hawaii Five-0		**Dracula**	

=== Saturday ===
Network	7:00 PM	7:30 PM	8:00 PM	8:30 PM	9:00 PM	9:30 PM	10:00 PM	10:30 PM
CTV	W5		Comedy Night on CTV				Crimetime Saturday	

== See also ==
- 2013–14 United States network television schedule
