= Underdogs (TV program) =

- Presented by: Wendy Mesley
- Country of origin: Canada
- Original language: English

Original release
- Network: CBC Television
- Release: November 14, 2006

Related
- Marketplace

Underdogs is a 2006 Canadian television spin-off of Marketplace. Host Wendy Mesley brings together three people, the "underdogs", who have a consumer complaint to help them win their way against three Canadian companies.
