= Le Grand Journal (Canadian TV program) =

Le Grand Journal is a Canadian news television program, which aired on the TQS network in Quebec from 1986 to 2008. The program was anchored by Jean-Luc Mongrain. The program was cancelled in 2008, prior to the network's rebranding as V in 2009.
