= 2017–18 Canadian network television schedule =

The 2017–18 network television schedule for the five major English commercial broadcast networks in Canada covers primetime hours from September 2017 through August 2018. The schedule is followed by a list per network of returning series, new series, and series canceled after the 2016–17 television season, for Canadian, American and other series.

CBC Television was first to announce its fall schedule on May 24, 2017, followed by Global on June 5, 2017, City on June 6, 2017, and CTV and CTV Two on June 7, 2017. As in the past, the commercial networks' announcements come shortly after the networks have had a chance to buy Canadian rights to new American series.

CTV Two and Global are not included on Saturday as they normally only schedule encore programming in primetime on Saturdays.

== Legend ==
Light blue indicates Local Programming.
Grey indicates Encore Programming.
Light green indicates sporting events.
Red indicates Canadian content shows, which is programming that originated in Canada.
Magenta indicates series being burned off and other irregularly scheduled programs, including specials.
Cyan indicates various programming.
Light yellow indicates the current schedule.

== Schedule ==
- New series are highlighted in **bold**. Series that have changed network are not highlighted as new series.
- All times given are in Canadian Eastern Time and Pacific Time (except for some live events or specials, including most sports, which are given in Eastern Time).
  - Most CBC programming airs at the same local time in all time zones, except Newfoundland time (add 30 minutes).
  - For commercial stations in the Central Time Zone, subtract one hour.
  - For commercial stations in the Atlantic and Mountain time zones, add one hour for programming between 8:00 and 10:00 PM. Programs airing at 10:00 PM ET/PT will generally air at 8:00 PM local on stations in these areas. For viewers in the Newfoundland time zone, add an additional 30 minutes to the Atlantic time schedule.
  - Notwithstanding the above, timeslots may occasionally vary further in some areas due to local simultaneous substitution considerations, compliance with watershed restrictions, or other factors.
  - From February 8 to February 25, 2018, CBC coverage of the 2018 Winter Olympics in Pyeongchang, South Korea live in all time zones, encompassing all of primetime those days.

=== Sunday ===
Network		7:00 PM	7:30 PM	8:00 PM	8:30 PM	9:00 PM	9:30 PM	10:00 PM	10:30 PM
CBC		Heartland		The Nature of Things		Firsthand		The National	
City	Fall	Sunnyside (R)	Bob's Burgers	Family Guy (R)	**Ghosted**	Family Guy	The Last Man on Earth	Encore Programming	Encore Programming
City	Late Fall	Sunnyside (R)	Bob's Burgers	Family Guy (R)	**Ghosted**	Family Guy	The Last Man on Earth	Nirvanna the Band the Show	**Fubar: The Age of the Computer**
City	Winter	Sunnyside (R)	Bob's Burgers	Family Guy (R)	**Ghosted**	Family Guy	The Last Man on Earth	Versailles	
City	Spring	Little Big Shots		Bob's Burgers	Brooklyn Nine-Nine	Family Guy	The Last Man on Earth	Versailles	
CTV	Fall	NFL overrun (continued to game completion)	SportsCentre	Lucifer		**The Disappearance**		**Ten Days in the Valley**	
CTV	Late Fall	NFL overrun (continued to game completion)	SportsCentre	**The Indian Detective**		Shark Tank		Shark Tank	
CTV	Spring	The Big Bang Theory (R)	The Big Bang Theory (R)	Lucifer		**The Detail**		**Deception**	
CTV Two	Fall	Encore Programming		Football Night in America (joined in progress)	Sunday Night Football (continued to game completion)				
CTV Two	Winter	Corner Gas (R)	Corner Gas (R)	CTV Movie				The Big Bang Theory (R)	Seinfeld (R)
CTV Two	Spring	Corner Gas (R)	Corner Gas (R)	**American Idol**				The Goldbergs (R)	Seinfeld (R)
Global	Fall	Border Security: Canada's Front Line (R)	The Simpsons	**Wisdom of the Crowd**		NCIS: Los Angeles		Madam Secretary	
Global	Spring	Border Security: Canada's Front Line (R)	The Simpsons	**Instinct**		NCIS: Los Angeles		Timeless	
Global	Summer	Border Security: Canada's Front Line		Big Brother		Instinct		Shades of Blue	

- Note: CTV aired the premiere of **Star Trek: Discovery** in simulcast with CBS on September 24.

=== Monday ===
Network		8:00 PM	8:30 PM	9:00 PM	9:30 PM	10:00 PM	10:30 PM
CBC	Fall	Murdoch Mysteries		**Alias Grace**		The National	
CBC	Late Fall	Murdoch Mysteries		**Frankie Drake Mysteries**		The National	
CBC	Late Winter	Murdoch Mysteries		**Caught** (2/26)		The National	
City	Fall	Dancing with the Stars				Scorpion	
City	Winter	The Bachelor		**The Resident**		Scorpion	
City	Spring	Modern Family (R)	Modern Family (R)	**The Resident**		Scorpion	
CTV	Fall	The Big Bang Theory	**Me, Myself & I**	**The Gifted**		**The Good Doctor**	
CTV	Late Fall	Lucifer		**The Gifted**		**The Good Doctor**	
CTV	Mid Winter	Lucifer		The Amazing Race		**The Good Doctor**	
CTV	Late Winter	The Voice				**The Good Doctor**	
CTV	Spring	The Voice				**The Crossing**	
CTV Two	Fall	The Voice				**The Goldbergs** (R)	Seinfeld (R)
CTV Two	Winter	Legends of Tomorrow		Flashpoint (R)		The Big Bang Theory (R)	Seinfeld (R)
CTV Two	Late Winter	Legends of Tomorrow		The Goldbergs (R)	**Living Biblically**	The Big Bang Theory (R)	Seinfeld (R)
CTV Two	Spring	**American Idol**				Legends of Tomorrow	
Global	Fall	Kevin Can Wait	**9JKL**	NCIS New Orleans		**The Brave**	
Global	Mid Fall	Kevin Can Wait	**9JKL**	Superior Donuts	Superstore	**The Brave**	
Global	Late Fall	Kevin Can Wait	Man with a Plan	Chicago Med		**The Brave**	
Global	Mid Winter	**Celebrity Big Brother**		NCIS: New Orleans (R)		Private Eyes (R)	
Global	Late Winter	Kevin Can Wait	Man with a Plan	Big Brother Canada		Chicago Med	
Global	Summer	Superstore	**A.P. Bio**	Bull		Elementary	

Note: The Bachelor runs from 7 p.m. to 9 p.m. Eastern when City has The Resident in simulcast.

=== Tuesday ===
Network		8:00 PM	8:30 PM	9:00 PM	9:30 PM	10:00 PM	10:30 PM
CBC	Fall	Rick Mercer Report	22 Minutes	Kim's Convenience	Mr. D	The National	
CBC	Winter	Rick Mercer Report	22 Minutes	Schitt's Creek	Workin' Moms	The National	
City	Fall	Lethal Weapon		The Mick	Brooklyn Nine-Nine	Encore Programming	
City	Winter	Lethal Weapon		**LA to Vegas**	The Mick	Encore Programming	
City	Spring	Lethal Weapon		**LA to Vegas**	New Girl	Encore Programming	
CTV	Fall	The Flash		This Is Us		**Kevin (Probably) Saves the World**	
CTV	Winter	**Ellen's Game of Games**		This Is Us		**Kevin (Probably) Saves the World**	
CTV	Mid Winter	Match Game		The Amazing Race		**Kevin (Probably) Saves the World**	
CTV	Late Winter	The Voice		This Is Us		**Kevin (Probably) Saves the World**	
CTV	Spring	The Voice		MasterChef Canada		**For the People**	
CTV Two	Fall	The Voice		Legends of Tomorrow		**The Goldbergs** (R)	Seinfeld (R)
CTV Two	Winter	The Flash		Castle (R)		The Big Bang Theory (R)	Seinfeld (R)
CTV Two	Mid Winter	The Flash		Flashpoint (R)		The Goldbergs (R)	Seinfeld (R)
CTV Two	Spring	The Flash		**Living Biblically**	**Splitting Up Together**	The Goldbergs (R)	Seinfeld (R)
CTV Two	Late Spring	The Flash		The Big Bang Theory (R)	**Splitting Up Together**	The Goldbergs (R)	Seinfeld (R)
Global	Fall	NCIS		Bull		**Law & Order True Crime: The Menendez Murders**	
Global	Late Fall	NCIS		Bull		NCIS: New Orleans	
Global	Mid Winter	The Wall		NCIS (R)		Private Eyes (R)	
Global	Late Winter	NCIS		Bull		NCIS: New Orleans	
Global	Summer	NCIS		NCIS: New Orleans		Salvation	

- Note: Until November 14, NCIS: New Orleans aired on Global at 7 pm eastern.
- Note: **Ellen's Game of Games** debuted on December 18 on CTV at 10 pm and airs back to back episodes on January 2.
- Note: CTV has Roseanne scheduled for pre-release at 7:30 pm eastern.

=== Wednesday ===
Network		8:00 PM	8:30 PM	9:00 PM	9:30 PM	10:00 PM	10:30 PM
CBC	Fall	**The Great British Baking Show**		**The Durrells**		The National	
CBC	Late Fall	**The Great Canadian Baking Show**		**Top of the Lake: China Girl**		The National	
CBC	Winter	**Burden of Truth** (1/10)		**The Detectives** (1/10)		The National	
City		The Blacklist		Modern Family	Black-ish	Encore Programming	
CTV	Fall	Criminal Minds		Law & Order: Special Victims Unit		Designated Survivor	
CTV	Winter	The X-Files		**The Launch**		Criminal Minds	
CTV	Late Winter	The X-Files		Law & Order: Special Victims Unit		Designated Survivor	
CTV	Spring	Criminal Minds		Law & Order: Special Victims Unit		Designated Survivor	
CTV	Late Spring	Code Black		Law & Order: Special Victims Unit		Designated Survivor	
CTV Two	Fall	The Goldbergs	American Housewife	Arrow		**The Goldbergs** (R)	Seinfeld (R)
CTV Two	Winter	The Goldbergs	American Housewife	**The Launch**		The Big Bang Theory (R)	Seinfeld (R)
CTV Two	Spring	The Goldbergs	**Alex, Inc.**	The Big Bang Theory (R)	American Housewife	The Goldbergs (R)	Seinfeld (R)
Global	Fall	Survivor		**SEAL Team**		Chicago P.D.	
Global	Winter	Mary Kills People		**9-1-1**		Chicago P.D.	
Global	Mid Winter	**Celebrity Big Brother**		**9-1-1**		Private Eyes (R)	
Global	Spring	Survivor		**SEAL Team**		Chicago P.D.	
Global	Summer	Big Brother		**TKO: Total Knock Out**		**Reverie**	

Note: Big Brother Canada airs at 7 p.m. Eastern, outside of Primetime hours.

=== Thursday ===
Network		8:00 PM	8:30 PM	9:00 PM	9:30 PM	10:00 PM	10:30 PM
CBC	Fall	Dragons' Den		**The Loch**		The National	
CBC	Late Fall	Dragons' Den		Holiday Movies		The National	
CBC	Winter	Dragons' Den		**The Secret** (1/11)		The National	
CBC	Late Winter	Dragons' Den		**Little Dog** (3/1)		The National	
City	Fall	**Bad Blood**		**The Orville**		Encore Programming	
City	Late Fall	Mom	Life in Pieces	**The Orville**		Encore Programming	
City	Winter	The Mindy Project	The Mindy Project	Mom	Life in Pieces	Encore Programming	
City	Mid Winter	Encore Programming					
City	Late Winter	Modern Family (R)	Modern Family (R)	Mom	Life in Pieces	Encore Programming	
CTV	Fall	Grey's Anatomy		Gotham		How to Get Away with Murder	
CTV	Late Fall	The Big Bang Theory	**Young Sheldon**	Gotham		How to Get Away with Murder	
CTV	Winter	The Big Bang Theory	**Young Sheldon**	Cardinal		How to Get Away with Murder	
CTV	Mid Winter	The Big Bang Theory	**Young Sheldon**	Encore Programming		The Amazing Race	
CTV	Late Winter	The Big Bang Theory	**Young Sheldon**	Criminal Minds		How to Get Away with Murder	
CTV	Spring	The Big Bang Theory	**Young Sheldon**	**Station 19**		Quantico	
CTV Two	Fall	NFL Thursday Night Kickoff / Football Night in (game site) (7:30 p.m. ET)	Thursday Night Football (continued to game completion)				
CTV Two	Late Fall	Holiday Movies and Specials					
CTV Two	Winter	The Disappearance		Arrow		The Big Bang Theory (R)	Seinfeld (R)
CTV Two	Late Winter	Gotham		Arrow		The Goldbergs (R)	Seinfeld (R)
Global	Fall	Superstore	The Good Place	**Will & Grace**	**Great News**	Chicago Fire	
Global	Mid Fall	Holiday Movies				**S.W.A.T.**	
Global	Late Fall	Superstore	Superior Donuts	**Will & Grace**	**9JKL**	**S.W.A.T.**	
Global	Winter	Superstore	The Good Place	**Will & Grace**	**Great News**	**S.W.A.T.**	
Global	Mid Winter	**Celebrity Big Brother**		**Will & Grace**	**Great News**	Chicago PD	
Global	Late Winter	Big Brother Canada		**Will & Grace**	**A.P. Bio**	**S.W.A.T.**	
Global	Summer	The Wall		Big Brother		Ransom	

- Note: As of November 2, CTV airs Grey's Anatomy airs at 7 p.m. Eastern.

=== Friday ===
Network		8:00 PM	8:30 PM	9:00 PM	9:30 PM	10:00 PM	10:30 PM
CBC	Fall	Marketplace	Interrupt This Program	The Fifth Estate		The National	
CBC	Winter	Marketplace	Hello Goodbye (1/12)	The Fifth Estate		The National	
City	Fall	Hell's Kitchen		The Middle	Speechless	Encore Programming	
City	Late Winter	Romantic Movie Favourites (2/22)				Encore Programming	
City	Spring	Modern Family (R)	The Middle	TBA			
CTV	Fall	Shark Tank		**Inhumans**		Blue Bloods	
CTV	Late Fall	Blindspot		Agents of S.H.I.E.L.D.		Blue Bloods	
CTV Two	Fall	Once Upon a Time		The Exorcist		**The Goldbergs** (R)	Seinfeld (R)
CTV Two	Winter	Younger	Younger	CTV Movie			
CTV Two	Late Winter	MasterChef		Once Upon a Time		The Goldbergs (R)	Seinfeld (R)
Global	Fall	MacGyver		Hawaii Five-0		Undercover Boss Canada	
Global	Winter	MacGyver		Hawaii Five-0		Chicago Fire	
Global	Summer	Private Eyes		Hawaii Five-0		First Dates	

=== Saturday ===
Network	7:00 PM	7:30 PM	8:00 PM	8:30 PM	9:00 PM	9:30 PM	10:00 PM	10:30 PM
CBC	Hockey Night in Canada (doubleheader game 1)						Hockey Night in Canada (doubleheader game 2; continued to game completion)	
City	Hockey Night in Canada						Encore Programming	
CTV	W5		The Big Bang Theory (R)	**The Mayor**	Law & Order: Special Victims Unit (R)		Crimetime Saturday	

== By network ==
=== Cancellations/series endings ===
==== YTV ====
- Chuck's Choice—Series Finale Ended on June 9, 2017, after one season.

== See also ==
- 2017–18 United States network television schedule
