= Opening Night (TV series) =

1974 Canadian theatrical drama television miniseries

- Genre: Drama
- Country of origin: Canada
- Original language: English
- No. of seasons: 1
- No. of episodes: 4

Production
- Producer: Robert Allen
- Running time: 90 minutes

Original release
- Network: CBC Television
- Release: 9 October 1974 – 12 March 1975

Opening Night is a Canadian theatrical drama television miniseries that aired on CBC Television 1974 to 1975.

== Premise ==
John Hirsch was appointed chief of CBC's drama department in 1974. He temporarily brought back the practice of presenting televised productions of stage dramas for the network in broadcasts such as Front Row Centre, Opening Night and Performance.

Four videotaped versions of theatrical works were presented during the 1974-75 season (times in Eastern):

- 9 October 1974: The Farm Show, by Theatre Passe Muraille, portrayed life in rural southwestern Ontario. The production starred Janet Amos, Anne Anglin, David Fox, Carole Galloway, Ted Johns and Miles Potter. Directors were Paul Thompson (theatrical) and Ron Meraska (broadcast).
- 23 October 1974, 8:30 p.m.: The Head, Guts, and Sound Bone Dance, adapted from a Michael Cook play. This drama was set in a fishing community that no longer has fish to harvest. This production starred Dick Buehler, Kelly Buehler, Pat Byrne, Gerard Parkes, Florence Paterson and Todd Stuckless and the broadcast was produced by Ray McConnell. It was the first CBC television drama to be produced in Newfoundland, performed by the Open Group in St. John's.
- 15 January 1975, 8:00 p.m.: Freedom of the City by Brian Friel, a dramatisation concerning 1970 riots in Derry. Hugh Webster wrote the broadcast adaptation based on a play which was presented on Broadway. Neil Munro, Florence Paterson and Mel Tuck starred, Eric Till directed.
- 12 March 1975, 9:30 p.m.: You're Gonna Be Alright, Jamie Boy by David Freeman, originating with the Tarragon Theatre. This drama starred Jayne Eastwood, David Ferry, Lillian Lewis, Chuck Shamata and Hugh Webster. David Peddie was producer and J. Edward Shaw directed.

These productions are not to be confused with CBC's later Opening Night series (2002).
