= CBC News: Sunday Night =

Television news magazine series in Canada

CBC News: Sunday Night is a Canadian television newsmagazine series that aired on Sunday evenings at 10 p.m. on CBC Television. It was, essentially, the Sunday night equivalent of The National, although it took a more features-oriented approach than its weekday counterpart. The program also aired on CBC Newsworld at 9 p.m., and is repeated at midnight and 5 a.m. the following morning.

CBC News: Sunday Report began in 1982 weeks or months after the debut of the 10 PM The National and The Journal. Anchored by Peter Mansbridge, it was a newscast plus a political panel that met every week to discuss current events.

The program, hosted by Evan Solomon and Carole MacNeil, covered the week's news. It should not be confused with CBC News: Sunday, a Sunday morning newsmagazine hosted by the same team, but which had a different programming focus, although the programs frequently shared features. Sunday Night replaced Sunday Report, a long-running but more standard newscast, in fall 2004.

The program ended in 2009, and was replaced with a Sunday edition of The National.
