= Broadcast network =

Form of centralized broadcasting

A broadcast network (sometimes called a terrestrial network) is a group of radio stations, television stations, or other electronic media outlets, that form an agreement to air, or broadcast, content from a centralized source. For example, ABC, CBS and NBC (U.S.), CBC/Radio-Canada (Canada), the BBC (UK), the ABC (Australia), ARD (Germany), PTV and IBC (Philippines), KBS (South Korea), and NHK (Japan) are TV networks that provide programming for local terrestrial television station affiliates to air using signals that can be picked up by the home television sets of local viewers. Networks generally, but not always, operate on a national scale; that is, they cover an entire country.

Streaming media, Internet radio, and webcasting are sometimes considered forms of broadcasting despite the lack of terrestrial stations; its practitioners may also be called "broadcasters" or even "broadcast networks".

Logos of the Five major American terrestrial television networks (clockwise from top left: ABC, NBC, CBS, Fox, and CW)

== American networks ==
=== AT&T's "WEAF Chain" ===
Original major radio broadcasting networks in the United States

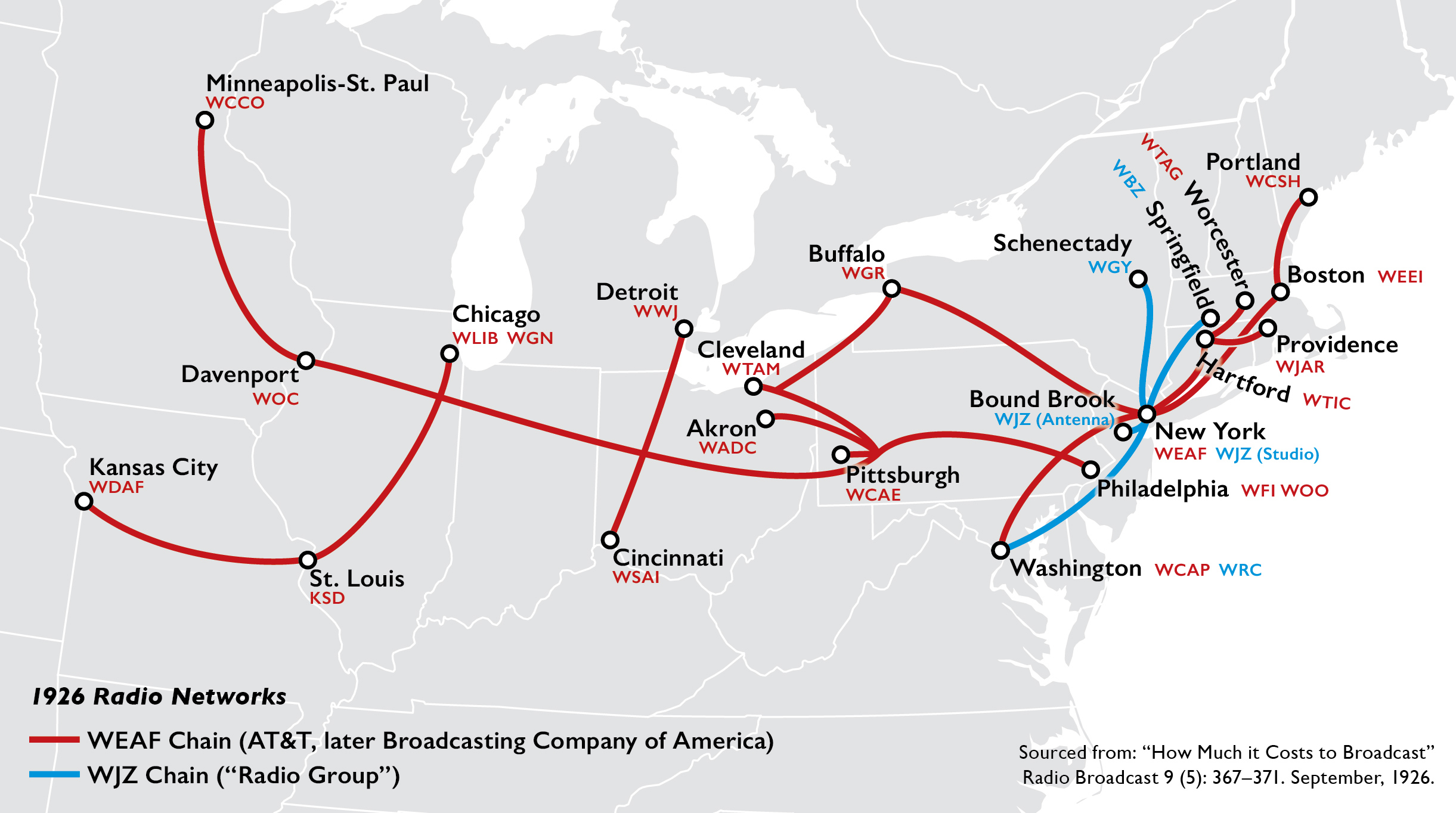
The WEAF and WJZ chains

Following the introduction of radio broadcasting in the early 1920s, the American Telephone and Telegraph Company (AT&T) developed the first radio network, linking together individual stations with specially prepared long-distance telephone lines in what at the time was called a "chain". The key station was AT&T's WEAF (now WFAN) in New York City. The network featured a variety of regularly scheduled programs which included sponsorships (at the time not called advertising but "toll broadcasting").

From the beginning, AT&T planned to eventually expand nationwide, so that national companies would be able reach large portions of the nation with their brand names and slogans in an efficient manner. At first the network's expansion was slow. In 1924, the Eveready Hour was broadcast over 12 stations, primarily located in the U.S. Northeast. Eveready Hour was the first commercially sponsored variety show in the history of broadcasting. By 1925, AT&T had linked together 26 stations in its network.

AT&T eventually decided to concentrate on its most profitable business, telephones. In 1926 it transferred its broadcasting interests into a subsidiary, the Broadcasting Company of America, which was sold to the Radio Corporation of America (RCA). RCA's purchase included an agreement allowing it to lease AT&T phone lines.

=== RCA's "WJZ Chain" ===
In 1922, the Radio Corporation of America (RCA) followed AT&T's network model lead, and formed a small competing network centered on its New York City station, WJZ (now WABC). However, conflict resulted as RCA had a limited ability to lease lines from AT&T and often had to use telegraph lines to connect stations, which had inferior acoustical properties.

=== NBC ===
After acquiring WEAF and AT&T's network assets in 1926, RCA created the National Broadcasting Company (NBC) and reorganized the WEAF chain (with WGR, WTIC, WTAG, WEEI, WJAR, WCSH, WFI-WLIT, WCAE, WRC, WTAM, WSAI, WWJ, WGN, WOC, KSD, WDAF, WCCO) as the NBC Red network and the WJZ chain as the NBC Blue network (with WBZ, WBZA, KYW, KDKA). (One explanation for the color designations is that they reflected the red and blue push pins used on a map that AT&T originally used to designate the affiliated stations on the two networks.)

On 23 December 1928, NBC instituted the first permanent transcontinental network. As of September 1938, when there were 154 NBC outlets; 23 composed the basic Red network and 24 composed the basic Blue network. Supplementing these basic networks were 107 stations, of which one was available only to the basic Red network, six were available only to the basic Blue network, and the remainder available to either. NBC also had a chain of shortwave stations, called the "NBC White Network", in the 1930s.

In 1941, the Federal Communications Commission's (FCC) Report on Chain Broadcasting reviewed the alleged monopolistic practices of the radio networks. The FCC was concerned NBC Red and NBC Blue were anti-competitive. Because the FCC did not have the power to directly regulate networks, it decided to enact regulations affecting the stations, and adopted standards intended to force NBC to relinquish one of its networks. In 1943, the Supreme Court upheld the FCC's power to enforce its chain broadcasting regulations. As a consequence, NBC Blue was sold to Edward Noble who later named it the American Broadcasting Company (ABC). After NBC Blue was divested the remaining NBC Red network was renamed the NBC Radio Network.

=== CBS ===
In 1927, United Independent Broadcasters, Inc., supported by the Columbia Phonograph Record Company, started a new network of 16 stations (WOR New York, WFBL Syracuse, WMAK Buffalo-Lockport, WNAC Boston, WEAN Providence, WCAU Philadelphia, WJAS Pittsburgh, WCAO Baltimore, WADC Akron, WAIU Columbus, WKRC Cincinnati, WGHP Detroit, WOWO Fort Wayne, WMAQ Chicago, KMOX St. Louis, KOIL Council Bluffs) named the Columbia Phonographic Broadcasting System.

In 1928, William S. Paley assumed control of the network, which under his leadership focused on entertainment programming, news, and news affiliation. He quickly turned the failing company around, which was named Columbia Broadcasting System, Inc. (CBS) in 1929. By the end of 1938 there were 113 CBS outlets. Regional networks on CBS also existed in various parts of the country.

CBS later hired Edward R. Murrow who is credited with boosting ratings dramatically. Murrow and CBS covered the war in Europe while Adolf Hitler was in power. NBC and ABC withdrew from the war for safety reasons. As a result of taking the risk, CBS's ratings skyrocketed.

=== ABC ===
In 1945, the NBC Blue network was sold to Edward John Noble, who later renamed it American Broadcasting Company (ABC). By the mid-1940s broadcasting had become a big Three television networks battle. ABC almost went bankrupt and in 1951 Leonard Goldenson and United Paramount Theaters bought the network for $25 million. In 1964, ABC won the ratings race in the 50 largest American markets. In the 1970–71 season, ABC ranked #1 in the Nielsen ratings with a medical drama called Marcus Welby, M.D., the first ABC television show to top the list.

=== Mutual ===
In 1929, a group of four radio stations in the major markets of New York City, Chicago, Cincinnati, and Detroit organized into a loose confederation known as the Quality Network. In 1934 this was reorganized as the Mutual Broadcasting System. The network was organized with the members contracting for telephone-line transmission facilities and agreeing to collectively enter into contracts with advertisers for their networked shows.

=== Westwood One News ===
Radio news network launched on January 1, 2015, and operated by Westwood One through its parent company Cumulus Media.

== Canadian national networks ==
The first network in Canada was CNR Radio starting in 1923. The first regularly scheduled coast-to-coast network program produced by CN Radio was broadcast on 27 December 1928. By 1930, the network consisted of 27 stations.

Its assets were acquired by the government owned Canadian Radio Broadcasting Commission (CRBC) in 1932.

=== CBC ===
Canadian Broadcasting Corporation (public network, founded in 1936, successor to the CRBC)

- CBC Radio One
- CBC Music
- CBC Television
- Ici Radio-Canada Première
- Ici Musique
- Ici Radio-Canada Télé

=== CTV ===
CTV Television Network (private, founded 1961) CTV2 (private, founded in 1995 as The NewNet, rebranded as a CTV network in 2010)

=== Global ===
Global Television Network (private, founded as an Ontario network in 1974, national in 1997)

=== Quebec ===
- TVA (private, founded 1971)
- Noovo (private, founded 1986)
- Télé-Québec (public, founded 1975)

== See also ==
- Radio network
- Television network
- Public broadcasting
- Commercial broadcasting
- Broadcasting
- Generalist channel
