= List of Canadian journalists =

This is a list of Canadian journalists.

== A ==
- Auguste Achintre (1834–1886) – journalist and essayist
- Charles Adler (born 1954) – Global Sunday, Adler OnLine
- David Akin
- Barbara Amiel (born 1940) – Maclean's, Toronto Sun
- Doris Anderson (1921–2007) – Chatelaine, Toronto Star
- Debra Arbec
- Peter Armstrong – business reporter, former host of CBC Radio's World Report and former foreign correspondent with CBC News
- Sally Armstrong
- Adrienne Arsenault (born 1967) – anchor at CBC-TV "The National". foreign correspondent with CBC News
- Michel Auger (1944–2020) – Le Journal de Montréal
- Michel C. Auger – Le Soleil, Radio-Canada, Le Journal de Montréal
- Nahlah Ayed (born 1970) – host of CBC Radio "Ideas" program, foreign correspondent with CBC News, former parliamentary reporter for The Canadian Press

== B ==
- Aaron Badgley (born 1964) – music journalist, All-Music Guide, The Fulcrum, The Spill Magazine, Lexicon Magazine, Immersive Audio Album
- Gary Bannerman (1947–2011) – Maclean's, National Post, The Globe and Mail, Toronto Star
- Molly Lyons Bar-David (1910–1987) — Jerusalem Post
- Rosemary Barton (born 1976) – CBC News senior politics correspondent
- Anita Bathe – CBC Vancouver reporter and anchor
- David Beers – The Tyee
- Pierre Berton (1920–2004) – journalist and historian; deceased
- Christine Birak – CBC health and science reporter
- Shaughnessy Bishop-Stall
- Conrad Black (born 1944) – National Post, National Review
- Christie Blatchford (1951–2020) – formerly with Toronto Sun, National Post, The Globe and Mail
- Keith Boag – retired; former CBC-TV correspondent
- Susan Bonner – host of CBC Radio "World News at 6" program.
- Mark Bourrie
- Amber Bracken – photojournalist
- Murray Brewster – CBC News defence writer
- Laurie Brown (born 1957) – former CBC arts reporter
- Charles Tory Bruce (1906–1971)
- Kim Brunhuber – CBC reporter
- Stephen Brunt (born 1959) – sports writer for The Globe and Mail
- Dianne Buckner – host of CBC-TV "Dragons Den, CBC business reporter, former host of Venture
- Stéphan Bureau (born 1964) – Le Téléjournal anchor
- Jennifer Burke – CTV News Channel anchor
- Hugh Burrill – Citytv Toronto sports anchor and reporter, now at Sportsnet

== C ==
- Theo Caldwell – National Post, Sun News Network
- Bill Cameron (1943–2005) – CBC Radio, Toronto Star, Maclean's, Global TV, Citytv, CBC TV, National Post
- Stevie Cameron (1943–2024)
- Dalton Camp (1920–2002) – Toronto Star columnist
- Jock Carroll (March 5, 1919 – August 4, 1995) – Canadian writer, journalist and photographer who worked for the Canadian media, including the Toronto Telegram
- Bill Carroll (born 1959) – CFRB radio talk show host
- Henry Champ (1937–2012) – CBC News: Morning
- Andrew Chang (born 1982) – anchor of CBC-TV "The National"
- Piya Chattopadhyay – host of CBC Radio "Sunday Morning" program
- Wei Chen – Canada AM, Toronto 1, CBC
- Ben Chin – CBC, CTV, Toronto 1; now political advisor in Ottawa
- Jojo Chintoh – Citytv reporter
- Adrienne Choquette (1915–1973) – various Quebec newspapers and journals
- Nathalie Chung – RDI / SRC
- Greg Clark (1892–1977) – war journalist
- Tom Clark – retired; formerly CTV News reporter and host of Global TV The West Block
- Adrienne Clarkson (born 1939) – CBC host, Take 30; later Governor General and retired
- David Cochrane (born 1973), CBC reporter and host of Power & Politics
- Lynn Colliar (born 1967) – former Global BC Noon News Hour anchor
- David Common – CBC reporter
- Brendan Connor
- Terence Corcoran (born 1942) – National Post columnist
- Michael Coren (born 1959) – Toronto Sun, Crossroads Television
- Andrew Coyne (born 1960) – National Post and member of CBC News' At Issue Panel, former columnist with The Globe and Mail and former editor with MacLean's
- Susanne Craig – The New York Times investigative journalist
- Lynn Crosbie (born 1963) – former CFTO TV reporter
- Bill Cunningham (1932–2024) – W5, CBC Newsworld
- Christopher Curtis (born 1985) investigative journalist from Montreal

== D ==
- Chantal Da Silva – freelance journalist
- Mark Dailey (1953–2010) – Citytv Toronto anchor/reporter
- Pauline Dakin – former CBC, now a university journalism professor
- Lindsey Deluce – former CTV Atlantic reporter/anchor; now with CP24
- Randall Denley – Ottawa Citizen
- Monika Deol – former Citytv Vancouver, former host of MuchMusic's Electric Circus
- Bernard Derome (born 1944) – former Radio–Canada Le Téléjournal anchor
- Peter Desbarats (1933–2014) – Global News, Toronto Star
- Jocelyn Desjardins (born 1970) – Radio-Canada
- Dave Devall – CFTO Toronto (CTV) weatherman
- Rosie DiManno – Toronto Star columnist
- Gordon Donaldson (1926–2001) – also a historian
- Robyn Doolittle (born 1984) – investigative reporter for the Globe and Mail, formerly of the Toronto Star
- Nathan Downer – CTV reporter and anchor
- Dwight Drummond (born 1968) – CBC Toronto reporter/anchor
- Francis D'Souza – Citytv Toronto reporter/anchor
- Michelle Dubé (born 1984) – CTV reporter and anchor
- Mike Duffy (born 1946) – retired. Former Canadian Senator and former CTV CBC political reporter.
- Eric Duhatschek – The Globe and Mail sportswriter
- Dominique Dumas – Radio X
- Simon Durivage (born 1944) – Le TVA 22 heures anchor
- Gwynne Dyer (born 1943) – British-Canadian military historian, author, professor, journalist, broadcaster, and retired naval officer.

== E ==
- Jean Edmonds – editor and columnist for the Financial Post, broadcaster for the CBC
- Rima Elkouri – La Presse

== F ==
- Mohamed Fahmy
- Avis Favaro (born 1960) – CTV News medical specialist
- Nadia Fezzani – magazines and TV documentaries; personalities' interviews on out–of–the–ordinary topics and American serial killers
- Robert Fife – politics reporter with the Globe & Mail; former CTV News Ottawa bureau chief
- Gillian Findlay – CBC, The Fifth Estate
- Mary Lou Finlay – retired; formerly host of CBC Radio's As It Happens and host of CBC-TV "The Journal"
- Robert Fisher – CBC host; former Global News anchor, former Focus Ontario host
- Harry Forestell
- Diane Francis (born 1946) – National Post reporter
- Whit Fraser (born 1942) – CBC reporter and anchor
- Chrystia Freeland (born 1968)
- Jesse Freeston (born 1985) – filmmaker and The Real News correspondent, Latin America
- Dawna Friesen (born 1964) – Global National anchor
- Barbara Frum (1937–1992) – former CBC the Journal host
- David Frum (born 1960) – writer for magazine "The Atlantic, National Post reporter, American Enterprise Institute, former speechwriter for President Bush; son of Barbara Frum
- Melissa Fung – former CBC reporter

== G ==
- Vicki Gabereau (born 1946) – former CTV talk show host
- Chris Gailus (born 1967) – Global BC News Hour weeknight anchor
- Céline Galipeau (born 1957) – Le Téléjournal anchor
- Mary Garofalo (born 1958) – host and senior producer of Global's 16x9 – The Bigger Picture
- Hana Gartner – co–host of CBC's the fifth estate, former CBC News reporter
- Françoise Gaudet-Smet (1902–1986) – former Quebec journalist
- Anthony Germain
- Jian Ghomeshi (born 1967) – former host of Q on CBC Radio One and CBC TV; British-Canadian broadcaster, writer, and musician
- Brad Giffen – CTV News Channel anchor and Canada AM; former with ABC and Fox in the United States
- Robin Gill (born 1978) – Global National anchor/reporter
- Malcolm Gladwell (born 1963) – author, New Yorker columnist
- Chris Glover
- Carol Goar – columnist, and former editorial page editor, Washington bureau chief and national affairs columnist for The Toronto Star
- Michel Godbout – CBMT anchor, CBC News at Six
- Dale Goldhawk – host of Rogers TV Goldhawk Live, former CTV reporter
- Jonathan Goldsbie – The National Post, NOW, Torontoist, Canadaland
- Bill Good – former CBC News Vancouver anchor, Canada Tonight anchor, CTV News at Six Vancouver anchor, CKNW AM 980 talk show host, retired
- Alison Gordon (1943–2015) – sportswriter
- Amelia Elizabeth Roe Gordon (1851–1932) – editor, White Ribbon Bulletin
- Charles Gordon – Ottawa Citizen columnist
- Patrick Graham - journalist, best known for work in Iraq
- Elizabeth Gray (1937–2023) – broadcaster, former host of As it Happens
- John Gray (1937–2020) – biographer, journalist at the Globe and Mail
- Melissa Grelo (born 1977) – former Citytv Toronto Reporter; now with CP24

== H ==
- David Halton – former CBC reporter and CBC Washington Bureau Chief
- Daniele Hamamdjian – CTV News
- Annette Hamm – CHCH News morning host/anchor
- Ian Hanomansing – CBC News anchor
- Tom Harrington
- Solange Harvey (1930–2008), French-Canadian journalist, columnist and writer
- Chantal Hébert (born 1954) – national affairs columnist for the Toronto Star, contributor to the "At Issue" panel on CBC Television's The National
- Doug Herbert – reporter, news anchor, CBC Kamloops
- Cheryl Hickey (born 1976) – host of ET! Canada, former Global News Toronto reporter
- Heather Hiscox (born 1965) – host of CBC News Now, formerly with CHCH in Hamilton, CBC Montreal and the Global Television Network
- John Honderich (1946–2022) – former publisher, editor, bureau chief and reporter for the Toronto Star, currently chairman of the board, Torstar Corporation
- Deborra Hope (1955–2023) – Global BC (retired on March 21, 2014)
- Tina House – APTN
- Frank Howard (1931–2008) – former daily columnist, Ottawa Citizen
- Rae Hull – CBC and CTV
- Kathryn Humphreys (born 1970) – City Toronto sports specialist and reporter
- Paul Hunter – CBC News reporter and correspondent
- Bob Hunter (1941–2005) – former Citytv Toronto reporter

== I ==
- Marci Ien – Canadian MP and Cabinet Minister. Formerly co-host of CTV The Social and former co-host of Canada AM.

== J ==
- Doug James – former foreign correspondent for CBC and CNN; now freelance writer and voice over artist
- Carolyn Jarvis (born 1979) – Global's 16x9
- Judith Jasmin (1916–1972) – radio journalist from Quebec
- Michaëlle Jean (born 1957) – former Radio Canada television anchor, former host of CBC Newsworld The Passionate Eye; 27th Governor General of Canada
- Michel Jean (born 1960) – TVA
- Peter Jennings (1938–2005) – former anchor, ABC News World News Tonight, former reporter CBC News and CTV News, deceased
- Dean Jobb – reporter for The Chronicle Herald for 20 years
- Brian D. Johnson – film critic and entertainment journalist for Maclean's
- Bob Johnstone (1930–2012) – CBC Radio broadcaster
- George Jonas (1935–2016) – former CBC journalist; Toronto Star; The National Post
- Edith Josie (1921–2010) – columnist for the Whitehorse Star

== K ==
- Ricki Katz
- Vassy Kapelos (born 1981) – host of CBC News Now "Power & Politics; formerly Global News Ottawa bureau chief and host of The West Block
- Max Keeping (1942–2015) – former CTV News Ottawa anchor
- Mark Kelley – CBC reporter and host
- Tom Kennedy (born 1952) – CTV News London correspondent
- Arthur Kent (born 1953) – former CBC reporter; brother of Peter Kent
- Peter Kent (born 1943) – former Global National news anchor; formerly federal MP from Ontario and Cabinet Minister in the Stephen Harper government; brother of Arthur Kent
- Tanya Kim – former host of CTV etalk and entertainment reporter with CityTV Toronto
- Wab Kinew (born 1981)
- Diana Kingsmill Wright (1908–1982)
- Harvey Kirck (1928–2002) – former CTV National News anchor
- Bartley Kives
- Jill Krop – former Global BC News Hour Final anchor, Unfiltered on Global News
- Faisal Kutty – Lawyers Weekly columnist

== L ==
- Lisa LaFlamme (born 1964) – CTV National News anchor
- Andréanne Lafond (1919–2012) – former Radio-Canada television host
- Michael Landsberg (born 1957) – sports broadcaster
- Michelle Lang (1975–2009) – Calgary Herald reporter killed in Afghanistan
- Mi-Jung Lee (born 1966) – former CTV News at 11:30 Vancouver anchor, now a reporter at CTV Vancouver
- Avi Lewis (born 1967)
- Dana Lewis – correspondent for Fox News Channel; former CTV News reporter
- Brian Linehan (1944–2004) – former CityTV entertainment reporter/interviewer
- Genevieve Lipsett (1885–1935) – political journalist, wrote for Winnipeg Telegram, The Montreal Star and Vancouver Sun
- John Lorinc – Toronto Star, Spacing
- Lezlie Lowe (born 1972) – The Chronicle Herald columnist
- Laura Lynch – CBC radio and television journalist

== M ==
- Gloria Macarenko – former CBC News Vancouver anchor, now host of BC Almanac on CBC Radio One
- Amber MacArthur (born 1976) – former Citytv Toronto (CityNews) new media specialist; now with CP24
- L. Ian MacDonald (born 1947) – columnist
- Neil Macdonald – CBC news reporter
- Rick MacInnes-Rae – CBC Radio
- Linden MacIntyre (born 1943) – CBC reporter
- Ron MacLean (born 1960) – CBC News sportscaster
- Marcia MacMillan (born 1970) – CTV News Channel anchor and formerly with The Weather Network
- Carole MacNeil (born 1964) – co–host of CBC News Sunday
- Sheila MacVicar – CBC News reporter
- Hazel Mae (born 1970) – former Sportsnet news anchor; now anchor for NESN
- Rafe Mair (1931–2017) – former radio talk show host in Vancouver, former BC Socred MLA
- Victor Malarek (born 1948) – reporter for CTV's W5, former host the fifth estate
- Eric Malling (1946–1998) – former host of CTV W5
- Peter Mansbridge (born 1948) – former CBC News The National anchor
- Don Martin (born 1956) – host of Power Play on CTV Newsnet and former Calgary Herald and National Post reporter and columnist
- Pamela Martin – former CTV News at Six Vancouver anchor, now working with BC Premier Christy Clark
- Gord Martineau (born 1947) – retired journalist and former City Toronto news anchor
- Dan Matheson – CTV News Channel anchor
- Bob McAdorey (1935–2005) – former global entertainment reporter; deceased
- Duncan McCue – CBC television and radio
- Marguerite McDonald (1941–2015) – former CBC Radio host
- Norris McDonald (1942–2023) – Toronto Star automotive editor
- Colleen McEdwards – CNN International anchor and correspondent; CBC News Political correspondent (Toronto); CTV News writer
- David McGuffin – CBC News Africa Bureau Chief; former CTV News Beijing bureau chief and Asia correspondent
- Jim McKenny (born 1946) – former Citytv sportscaster, former NHL player
- Bob McKeown (born 1950) – CBC The Fifth Estate and former NBC Dateline reporter
- Ryan McMahon – comedian, journalist and podcaster
- Anne-Marie Mediwake (born 1975) – anchor, formerly with CBC Toronto and Global Toronto; now co-host of CTV Your Morning
- Carol Anne Meehan (born 1956)
- Wendy Mesley (born 1957) – CBC reporter/anchor, former Undercurrents (CBC current affairs series) host
- Wendy Metcalfe – Toronto Sun and Ottawa Sun editor-in-chief
- Alex Mihailovich – Global 16X9: The Bigger Picture investigative correspondent
- Terry Milewski – retired CBC reporter; occasional fill-in reporter/host with CBC
- Roswell George Mills – Montreal Star, Les Mouches Fantastiques
- Gaëtane de Montreuil (1867–1951) – early Canadian woman journalist
- Harrison Mooney – Vancouver Sun reporter
- Tracy Moore (born 1975) – host of Cityline, former reporter for Citytv Toronto's Breakfast Television and City News Toronto
- Keith Morrison (born 1947) – Dateline NBC reporter, former Canada AM host and former CBC reporter
- Jennifer Mossop – former CHCH Hamilton news anchor, former Ontario Liberal MPP
- Anne Mroczkowski (born 1953) – former Global Toronto and CityTV news anchor
- Cynthia Mulligan – City Toronto education specialist
- Jim Munson (born 1946) – former broadcast news and CTV reporter, former director of communications in the Prime Minister's Office of Jean Chrétien, former Liberal senator
- Rex Murphy (1947–2024) – host of CBC Radio's Cross Country Canada
- Kasia Mychajlowycz – Canadaland, Globe & Mail

== N ==
- Pascale Nadeau (born 1960) – Le Téléjournal anchor
- Joyce Napier (born 1958)
- Knowlton Nash (1927–2014) – former CBC National News anchor, former host of Witness (CBC documentary series)
- Farah Nasser – former Citytv Toronto reporter/anchor, CP24. Current co-anchor at Global News Toronto
- Tara Nelson – former Global National reporter/anchor, now CTV News at Six Calgary anchor
- Don Newman (born 1940) – former host of CBCNW Politics
- Kevin Newman (born 1959) – CTV News, former co–host of Question Period; former Global National anchor, former ABC News reporter; former CBC anchor
- Peter C. Newman (1929–2023) – Toronto Sun journalist, author, former editor for the Toronto Star
- Elizabeth Nickson – The Globe and Mail columnist

== O ==
- Carol Off – host of As it Happens on CBC Radio
- Walter D. O'Hearn – correspondent, editor and later executive director of the Montreal Star
- Vernon Oickle – member of the Atlantic Journalism Hall of Fame (2020)
- Craig Oliver (born 1938) – former CTV Ottawa Bureau Chief; now political correspondent and chief parliamentary correspondent
- David Onley (1950–2023) – former Citytv Toronto Science and Technology Specialist; CP24 news anchor; later Lieutenant Governor of Ontario
- Seamus O'Regan (born 1971) – former host of Canada AM and now Liberal MP
- Susan Ormiston – CBC host

== P ==
- Steve Paikin (born 1960) – host of TVO's The Agenda with Steve Paikin; formerly with CBC
- Tony Parsons – former BCTV/Global BC News Hour anchor; former CBC Vancouver at Six anchor, retired
- Vic Parsons
- Jacquie Perrin – CBC
- Angelo Persichilli – Toronto Star columnist, Corriere Canadese editor
- Saša Petricic – CBC The National correspondent
- Karen Pinchin
- Jacques Poitras – CBC New Brunswick provincial affairs reporter
- Aarti Pole – host CBC News Network; former Global National Washington correspondent
- Dini Petty (born 1945) – former talk show host with Citytv Toronto and CTV
- Bruce Phillips (1930–2014) – CTV News (1968–1985)
- Claude Poirier (born 1938) – TVA crime reporter
- Valerie Pringle (born 1953) – former CBC daytime anchor
- Jackson Proskow – Global National's Washington Bureau Chief
- Dina Pugliese (born 1974) – host of City's Breakfast Television; host of Star! Daily
- Karyn Pugliese – APTN
- Belle Puri – CBC Vancouver reporter

== R ==
- Tim Ralfe (1938–2000) – CBC reporter
- Troy Reeb – CanWest global vice-president, former Global National reporter, now senior vice president of news for Shaw Media
- Waubgeshig Rice (born 1979) – CBC television and radio journalist
- Graham Richardson (born 1970) – CTV News reporter, former Focus Ontario host
- Daniel Richler – BookTV host, former CBCNW host
- David Ridgen – former CBC investigative, Independent filmmaker
- Sandie Rinaldo (born 1950) – CTV National News weekend anchor
- Leslie Roberts (born 1962) – former Global Toronto anchor
- Lloyd Robertson (born 1934) – former CTV National News anchor; host of W5
- Ann Rohmer (born 1958) – former Citytv Toronto anchor/host; now with CP24
- Teresa Roncon – Discovery Channel Canada, former CFTO Toronto (CTV) reporter
- Oakland Ross
- Ioanna Roumeliotis - CBC
- Patrice Roy (born 1963) - Télévision de Radio-Canada
- Scott Russell – CBC Sports reporter

== S ==
- Omar Sachedina (born 1982) – CTV News reporter, former CP24 anchor, former Citytv Toronto reporter
- Morley Safer (1931–2016) – reporter and correspondent for CBS News newsmagazine show 60 Minutes and former reporter for the London Free Press
- Percy Saltzman (1915–2007) – late CBC weatherman who used to throw his chalk up into the air
- Doug Saunders – columnist and European bureau chief with The Globe and Mail
- Joe Schlesinger (1928–2019) – veteran CBC reporter
- Camilla Scott (born 1961) – former talk show host
- Dave Seglins – CBC Radio
- Sid Seixeiro (born 1977) – sportscaster, host of Breakfast Television
- Jeff Semple – Global National reporter and substitute anchor
- Merle Shain (1935–1989)
- Alexandra Shimo
- Morton Shulman (1925–2000) – former host of The Shulman Files, former Ontario NDP MPP, former Coroner
- Haroon Siddiqui (born 1942) – Editor Emeritus and columnist, The Toronto Star
- Moe Sihota (born 1955) – former host The New VI Victoria, former BC NDP MLA
- Peter Silverman (1931–2021) – former Citytv Toronto reporter
- Jeffrey Simpson (born 1949) – columnist, The Globe and Mail
- Katie Simpson – CBC journalist
- Stephen Smart – former CBC British Columbia legislature journalist
- Alison Smith (born 1954) – CBC radio and television anchor
- Danielle Smith (born 1971)
- Gail Smith (born 1955)
- Roger Smith (born 1951) – CTV News reporter
- Linden Soles (born 1956)
- Evan Solomon (born 1968)
- Shirley Solomon – former talk show host
- Eric Sorensen – Global News Washington, D.C. Bureau Chief, former CBC News reporter
- Boris Spremo (1935–2017) – photojournalist for the Toronto Star, retired
- Angela Sterritt – television and radio reporter for CBC Vancouver
- Walter Stewart (1941–2004) – newspaper, magazine and book–length journalist
- David Suzuki (born 1936) – host of CBC's The Nature of Things
- Diana Swain – CBLT news anchor, The National sub–anchor
- Alexandra Szacka – CBC/Radio-Canada correspondent in Moscow

== T ==
- Jane Taber – reporter, Halifax Bureau of The Globe and Mail and former co–host of Question Period
- Tamara Taggart (born 1968) – CTV News at Six Vancouver anchor (former – was fired May 2018)
- Tanya Talaga – Toronto Star
- Scott Taylor (born 1960) – publisher, Esprit de Corps
- Jan Tennant (born 1937) – retired Global Toronto anchor
- Ellie Tesher – advice columnist
- Sophie Thibault (born 1961) – Le TVA 22 heures anchor
- Rosemary Thompson (born 1964) – former Washington correspondent, deputy bureau chief for CTV
- Beverly Thomson (1964–2025) – anchor CTV News Network. Formerly host of Canada AM, Global News Toronto anchor, and former CTV Toronto anchor
- Harry Thurston – written for over 30 publications
- Paula Todd – journalism professor, investigative journalist, non-fiction author
- Asha Tomlinson – Marketplace
- James Travers (1948–2011) – Toronto Star political columnist, deceased
- Anna Maria Tremonti (born 1957) – podcast host; formerly CBC radio host of The Current, former CBC TV reporter
- Peter Trueman (1934–2021) – original anchor, Global News
- Sheldon Turcott (1936–2000) – CBC The National
- Garth Turner (born 1949) – former CTV business reporter, former Toronto Sun business reporter, former Conservative and Liberal MP

== U ==
- Robyn Urback (born 1988) – Globe & Mail journalist and political commentator

== V ==
- Jennifer Valentyne (born 1967) – Global Toronto co-host and former CityTV Toronto's Breakfast Television Live–Eye Host
- Michael Valpy – journalist
- Julie Van Dusen – CBC News reporter
- Jim Van Horne (born 1950) – Sportsnet news anchor, former TSN Sportsdesk anchor
- Jody Vance (born 1967) – City Vancouver Breakfast Television co–host and news anchor
- Ali Velshi (born 1969) – CNN, former CTV Toronto reporter
- Neelam Verma – Sun News Network

== W ==
- Pamela Wallin (born 1953) – former CBC national magazine anchor and current member of the Senate from Saskatchewan
- Jennifer Ward (born 1957) – CTV News Channel anchor
- Paul Watson (born 1959) – Toronto Star
- Jack Webster (1918–1999) – host of BCTV Webster
- Rick Westhead (born 1971) – sports correspondent for TSN
- Kate Wheeler – former CTV Newsnet anchor, former CTV Toronto anchor
- Brian Williams (born 1946) – Canadian sportscaster best known for Olympic coverages, former CBC anchor and current anchor at CTV/TSN
- Fred Williams (1863–1944) – former executive of Parliamentary Press Gallery, and journalist to various Canadian newspapers
- Nancy Wilson – former CBC and CTV reporter, anchor, and host
- Paul Workman – CTV News foreign correspondent
- Peter Worthington (1927–2013) – Toronto Sun journalist, deceased

== XYZ ==
- Lubor J. Zink (1920–2003) – former Toronto Telegram and Toronto Sun columnist
- Moses Znaimer (born 1942) – founder of Citytv, former host

== See also ==
- List of Canadian Broadcasting Corporation personalities
- List of CTV personalities
- List of Global Television Network personalities
- Lists of Canadian writers
