= List of CTV personalities =

This is a list of past and present personalities associated with CTV Television Network, CTV News Channel, CTV Life Channel, CTV Comedy Channel, and CTV Sci-Fi Channel. It should only include people associated with non-fiction programming, not actors.

== A ==
- David Akin, former parliamentary correspondent
- Thea Andrews, former co-host of etalk
- Claudio Aprile, judge on MasterChef Canada

== B ==
- Ashleigh Banfield, former weekend anchor at CTV Edmonton now with CNN
- Jeanne Beker, fashion and entertainment segments on Canada AM and The Marilyn Denis Show
- Christine Bentley, former News at Six anchor and reporter at CTV Toronto
- Mary Berg, Mary's Kitchen Crush
- Satinder Bindra, former reporter at Vancouver Television (now CTV Vancouver)
- Jully Black, former correspondent on Canadian Idol and etalk
- Rod Black, sports commentator, sportscaster, co-hosted Canada AM, and former sports announcer at CTV Winnipeg
- Michael Bonacini, judge on MasterChef Canada
- Rob Brown, former photojournalist at CTV Yorkton and Vancouver Bureau Chief at CTV Vancouver
- Mike Bullard, hosted Open Mike with Mike Bullard
- Jennifer Burke, anchor on CTV News Channel

== C ==
- Elaine Callei, co-hosted Canada AM
- Henry Champ, contributor on W5
- Wei Chen, former investigative reporter on W5, anchor on Canada AM, host/co-host of Canada AM Weekend, fill-in anchor on CTV National News and CTV Newsnet (now CTV News Channel)
- Ben Chin, former Atlantic Bureau Chief
- Tom Clark, former CTV National News reporter/fill-in anchor, hosted Question Period, and hosted On the Hill
- Brendan Connor, anchor and producer at CTV Northern Ontario
- Arisa Cox, former reporter at CTV Ottawa
- Jessi Cruickshank, former Los Angeles correspondent on etalk
- Bill Cunningham, former co-host and executive producer of W5
- Anna Cyzon, former reporter on etalk

== D ==
- Marilyn Denis, The Marilyn Denis Show
- Dave Devall, former weathercaster at Toronto
- Monika Deol, anchored the inaugural Vancouver News at Six on Vancouver Television (now CTV Vancouver)
- Travis Dhanraj, former reporter
- Gordon Donaldson, featured on W5
- Jon Dore, former correspondent on Canadian Idol
- Ab Douglas, former co-anchor of CTV National News
- Nathan Downer, weekday co-anchor, CTV News at Six at CTV Toronto
- Frank Drea, former CTV National News reporter and contributor on W5
- Michelle Dubé, weekday co-anchor, CTV News at Six at CTV Toronto
- Mike Duffy, political reporter; hosted Sunday Edition, Question Period, Countdown with Mike Duffy, and Mike Duffy Live.

== E ==
- Tyrone Edwards, co-host of etalk
- Harry Elton, former anchor at CTV Ottawa

== F ==
- Avis Favaro, CTV National News reporter specializing in medical journalism
- Robert Fife, former Ottawa Bureau Chief and co-host of Question Period
- Farley Flex, former judge on Canadian Idol
- Stewart Francis, co-hosted You Bet Your Ass
- Dawna Friesen, former anchor on CTV Newsnet

== G ==
- Vicki Gabereau, The Vicki Gabereau Show
- David Giammarco, former senior entertainment reporter on etalk, Canada AM, and CTV Newsnet (now CTV News Channel)
- Tom Gibney, former News at Six anchor at CTV Toronto
- Brad Giffen, former reporter on World Beat News (later rebranded as CFTO News in early 1998, and CTV News in 2005) CTV Toronto and anchor at CTV News Channel
- Robin Gill, former anchor and reporter at CTV Yorkton
- Jake Gold, former judge on Canadian Idol
- Bill Good, anchored the Vancouver edition of Canada Tonight on BCTV (previous CTV affiliate) and former co-anchor of News at Six on CTV Vancouver
- Dale Goldhawk, former investigative reporter and consumer ombudsman on CTV National News
- Danielle Graham, co-host/reporter on etalk and former contributor on Canada AM
- Edward Greenspon, former host of Question Period
- Sophie Grégoire, former Quebec correspondent on etalk
- Melissa Grelo, moderator on The Social and contributor on Your Morning

== H ==
- Avery Haines, co-host of W5
- Rena Heer, former Canada AM weathercaster for western Canada/co-weathercaster on the national edition and News at Six reporter at CTV Vancouver
- Sitara Hewitt, co-hosted You Bet Your Ass
- Barb Higgins, former News at Six anchor for CTV Calgary
- Rae Hull, journalist
- Jeff Hutcheson, former sports/weathercaster on Canada AM
- Helen Hutchinson, co-host of Canada AM and former host of W5

== I ==
- John Ibbitson, former host of Question Period
- Marci Ien, former reporter for CTV News, co-hosted/anchored Canada AM, and former co-host of The Social
- Orin Isaacs, band leader of Orin Isaacs and the Open Mike Band on Open Mike with Mike Bullard

== J ==
- Peter Jennings, former reporter and anchor at CTV Ottawa and former anchor on ABC World News
- Sass Jordan, former judge on Canadian Idol

== K ==
- Max Keeping, former Parliamentary Bureau Reporter and anchor for News at Six at CTV Ottawa
- Tom Kennedy, former investigative report on W5
- Pat Kiernan, former reporter and anchor at CTV Edmonton
- Tanya Kim, former co-host of etalk
- Harvey Kirck, former co-anchor of CTV National News
- Elvira Kurt, hosted PopCultured

== L ==
- Lisa LaFlamme, former chief CTV National News anchor, co-host of Canada AM and W5, former international affairs correspondent
- Baden Langton, former co-anchor of CTV National News
- Mi-Jung Lee, weeknight co-anchor of News at Six at CTV Vancouver
- Avi Lewis
- Dana Lewis, former Middle East Bureau Chief and correspondent
- Cynthia Loyst, co-host on The Social
- Alvin Leung, judge on MasterChef Canada
- Lainey Lui, senior correspondent on etalk and former co-host on The Social
- Charles Lynch, former co-anchor for CTV National News

== M ==
- Janis Mackey Frayer, former Asia, Middle East, and South Asia Bureau Chief
- Michael Maclear, former foreign correspondent for CTV News and contributor on W5
- Linda MacLennan, co-hosted on Canada AM
- Marcia MacMillan, CTV News Evening Direct anchor
- Joy Malbon, CTV National News reporter
- Victor Malarek, senior reporter on W5
- Eric Malling, former host of W5 and Mavericks
- Don Martin, former host of Power Play
- Pamela Martin, former anchor on BCTV (previous CTV affiliate) and co-anchor of News at Six on CTV Vancouver
- Gord Martineau, former reporter at CTV Toronto
- Dan Matheson, former sportscaster, co-hosted Canada AM and former anchor on CTV News Channel
- David McGuffin, former Beijing Bureau Chief and Asia correspondent
- Bernie McNamee, former reporter at CTV Toronto
- Anne-Marie Mediwake, co-host of your Your Morning
- Carol Anne Meehan, former weeknight anchor at CTV Ottawa
- Traci Melchor, senior correspondent on etalk and former co-host on The Social
- Leah Miller, host of So You Think You Can Dance Canada and former correspondent on etalk
- Jon Montgomery, host of The Amazing Race Canada
- Keith Morrison, former co-host and newsreader on Canada AM, CTV National News national affairs correspondent and fill-in anchor
- Bryan Mudryk, former sports anchor and reporter at CTV Edmonton now with TSN
- Ben Mulroney, former co-host of Your Morning and former host of Canadian Idol and etalk
- Jim Munson, former Ottawa and London correspondent and Beijing Bureau Chief

== N ==
- Joyce Napier, CTV National News Parliamentary Bureau Chief
- Tara Nelson, News a Six anchor at CTV Calgary
- Kevin Newman, W5 and fill-in anchor for CTV National News, former co-host of Question Period

== O ==
- Craig Oliver, CTV National News reporter, political and chief parliamentary correspondent, former Ottawa Bureau Chief, and former host/co-host and current panelist of Question Period
- Seamus O'Regan, co-hosted Canada AM
- Susan Ormiston, former host and correspondent on W5 and national affairs correspondent with CTV News

== P ==
- Jesse Palmer, former reporter on etalk
- Tony Parsons, former reporter at CTV Toronto
- Pierre Pascau, co-host of Canada AM
- Norm Perry, hosted Perry's Probe at CTV Toronto and co-hosted/longest serving host on Canada AM
- Dini Petty, The Dini Petty Show
- Bruce Phillips, first host of Question Period (1968–1985) and former Ottawa Bureau Chief
- Valerie Pringle, hosted/co-hosted Canada AM and Valerie Pringle Has Left the Building

== R ==
- Graham Richardson, weeknight anchor of News at Six at CTV Ottawa and former Parliamentary bureau reporter and host of On the Hill
- Ryan Rishaug, former sports anchor at CTV Edmonton now with TSN
- Sandie Rinaldo, weekend anchor on CTV National News co-host and contributing reporter on W5, former anchor on Canada AM, former co-host of World Beat News at CTV Toronto
- John Roberts, co-hosted Canada AM
- Lloyd Robertson, co-host of W5 and former CTV National News anchor
- Teresa Roncon, former reporter at CTV Toronto

== S ==
- Omar Sachedina, CTV National News reporter and current anchor
- Percy Saltzman, first co-host and weathercaster on Canada AM
- Camilla Scott, The Camilla Scott Show
- Gail Scott, former parliamentary correspondent, co-hosted Canada AM, and W5
- Martin Seemungal, Middle East Bureau Chief and former reporter at CTV Ottawa
- Angie Seth, former anchor, CTV News Channel
- Marla Shapiro, Dr. Marla and Friends and Balance: Television for Living Well
- Ken Shaw, former weekday co-anchor, News at Noon and News at Six at CTV Toronto
- Brian Smith, former sports anchor at CTV Ottawa
- Roger Smith, former Beijing Bureau Chief and reporter at CTV Ottawa
- Evan Solomon, current host of Question Period
- Devon Soltendieck, former reporter on etalk
- Natasha Staniszewski, former news and sports reporter/anchor at CTV Yorkton, CTV Prince Albert, CTV Saskatoon, and CTV Edmonton and formerly on TSN
- Peter Stursberg former co-anchor of CTV National News, newscaster and commentator at CTV Ottawa
- Sylvia Sweeney, former host of W5

== T ==
- Jane Taber, former co-host of Question Period
- Tamara Taggart, former anchor of News at Six at CTV Vancouver
- Mutsumi Takahashi, anchor and host at CTV Montreal
- Akshay Tandon, anchor on CTV News Channel
- Carole Taylor, first co-host of Canada AM and hosted W5
- Cristina Tenaglia, former anchor at CP24 and CTV National News
- Rosemary Thompson, former Montreal Bureau Chief, Washington, D.C. correspondent, Ottawa correspondent, and guest host of Question Period and Mike Duffy Live
- Beverly Thomson, journalist and correspondent CTV News Channel and co-host of Canada AM
- Alex Trebek, hosted Stars on Ice
- Garth Turner, former business reporter

== V ==
- Todd van der Heyden, CTV News Afternoon Express anchor
- Ali Velshi, former reporter at CTV Toronto

== W ==
- Carolyn Waldo, former weekend sports anchor at CTV Ottawa
- Pamela Wallin, journalist, co-hosted Canada AM and Question Period, hosted Who Wants to Be a Millionaire: Canadian Edition
- Jennifer Ward, weekend morning anchor on CTV News Channel, former regular anchor on Canada AM, and former anchor and reporter at CTV Toronto
- Zack Werner, former judge on Canadian Idol
- Kate Wheeler, former daytime anchor and reporter for CTV News Channel, fill-anchor on CTV National News, fill-in newsreader and hosted Canada AM, and former reporter and co-anchor for News at Six at CTV Toronto
- Nancy Wilson, co-hosted Canada AM and former co-anchor at CTV Ottawa
- Paul Workman, CTV National News London Bureau Chief, former Washington Bureau Chief, and former South Asia correspondent

== Y ==
- Stephen Yan, Wok with Yan

== See also ==
- List of Canadian television personalities
