= Robert Hurst (broadcaster) =

Robert Hurst is a Canadian newscaster, television executive, and former president of CTV News.

== Biography ==
Hurst was raised in Cooksville, Mississauga, where he attended Thomas L. Kennedy Secondary School. He began to attain an interest in politics in 1960 whilst watching coverage of the nominating conventions during the 1960 United States presidential election campaign. At the University of Western Ontario, Hurst pursued a degree in liberal arts and graduate studies in journalism. He also became the school's head cheerleader, after neither their basketball nor football teams invited him to tryouts.

One of Hurst's first forays into broadcasting was a segment for a local radio station, focusing on campus news. He began working for CTV in January 1973, initially as a writer for its recently introduced morning show, Canada AM. Later that year, he stepped down from the position, and became a city hall correspondent for CTV's Toronto station CFTO-TV. At the age of 26, following the 1975 Ontario general election, Hurst was promoted to news director at the station. He described the CFTO staff as having "the best core groups, most spirited groups, [the] journalistically driven groups that CFTO has ever had." He then took various other positions, particularly as a foreign correspondent.

In 1994, Hurst returned to Canada and began taking executive roles at CTV News, including leading the development and launch of the division's news channel CTV News 1, and became executive producer of its newsmagazine W5—which resulted in a major retooling of the program. In 2000, he became the general manager of the network's operations in British Columbia. In September 2002, he was named president of CTV News; one of his first major changes was a retooling of the CTV National News back towards a more straightforward and headline-oriented format. In December 2010, after eight years in the role, Hurst announced that he would step down. He explained that he had held the role for much longer than his predecessors, wanted to leave while CTV was still "at the top", and was "waiting for the right moment" in the news cycle to do so.

== Accolades ==
In 1983, Hurst won a gold medal at the New York Film Festival for his documentary film China Today.
