= CTV News Channel (Canadian TV channel) =

Canadian television news channel

- Country: Canada
- Broadcast area: Nationwide
- Headquarters: Toronto, Ontario

Programming
- Picture format: 1080i HDTV (downscaled to letterboxed 480i for the SDTV feed)

Ownership
- Owner: BCE Inc.
- Parent: CTV Inc. (Bell Media)
- Sister channels: CTV; CTV 2; CP24; BNN Bloomberg; CTV Comedy Channel; CTV Drama Channel; CTV Life Channel; CTV Nature Channel; CTV Sci-Fi Channel; CTV Speed Channel; CTV Wild Channel; Oxygen; USA Network; Much; TSN; Noovo (French language)

History
- Launched: October 17, 1997; 29 years ago
- Former names: CTV News 1 (1997–1999); CTV Newsnet (1999–2009)

Links
- Website: ctvnews.ca/ctv-news-channel

CTV News Channel is a Canadian specialty news channel owned by Bell Media (a wholly owned subsidiary of Bell Canada). It broadcasts national and international news headlines, breaking news, and information. The channel is headquartered at 9 Channel Nine Court in the Agincourt neighbourhood of Scarborough in Toronto, Ontario.

== History ==
First logo, used from 1997 to 1999.

In September 1996, CTV Television Network Ltd. (a division of CTV) was granted a broadcast licence by the Canadian Radio-television and Telecommunications Commission (CRTC) for CTV N1, a national English language specialty television service that would broadcast "news, weather and sports reports, as well as business, consumer and lifestyle information", in a 'headline news' format on a 15-minute news wheel.

The channel was launched on October 17, 1997 as CTV News 1. Under the terms of this licence, the channel broadcast news and information on a 15-minute wheel, beginning a new cycle every 15 minutes using a pre-recorded, server-hosted configuration. Not long after its launch, however, it began covering more breaking news. CTV News 1 used news segments from CTV National News and local CTV and BBS affiliates.

The channel began with its news anchors sitting at a desk which would periodically, while the anchor was not speaking, spin in a circle to change the background in front of which the anchor sat. This gimmick was criticized, and soon abandoned. The channel included a large on-screen news ticker that provided news updates, weather, sports scores, stock trading data, among other information. For many years, the network has aired the CTV National News at 10 pm Eastern – or 11 pm Atlantic, when the newscast begins its nightly run across the network (it airs at 11 pm local time over the air, or 11:30 pm in Newfoundland and southeastern Labrador). It is repeated every hour until 2 am Eastern, or 11 pm Pacific.

At launch, this channel was carried to cable companies. The network added a sports news format for sports updates like Sky Sports News.

Second logo, used from 1999 to 2009.

On September 8, 1999, the channel was renamed CTV Newsnet, after the launch of then-sister channel, CTV Sportsnet.

CTV sought amendments to the channel's condition of licence that had restricted it to a 15-minute news wheel, in order to allow greater coverage of breaking news, longer-form news-oriented discussion and other programming. These requests were met with mixed decisions from the CRTC. On April 7, 2005, the CRTC removed the condition mandating a 15-minute news cycle, substituting new but much more liberal conditions including the allowance of a small percentage of airtime devoted to long-form discussion programming.

On August 22, 2005, CTV Newsnet unveiled a new, full screen format with a considerably smaller news ticker broadcasting only news headlines, and revamped its late afternoon and primetime programming, with increases to its anchor, reporting and production teams, and a greater emphasis on general news from the main anchor desk, eliminating sports and business coverage. The network hoped to capitalize in part on the lockout which had nearly eliminated news programming on CBC Television (outside Quebec) and CBC Newsworld.

Before the 2005 format change, sports segments were co-branded with TSN, and business news with Report on Business Television (now BNN Bloomberg). These channels are owned by the same companies as CTV and Newsnet. Earlier in the network's history, weather reports were provided by The Weather Network, which is independently owned, and sports segments were once co-branded with Headline Sports, and then later by CTV Sportsnet, which CTV owned before it acquired TSN.

Third logo, used from 2009 to 2011.

CTV Newsnet was renamed CTV News Channel on May 26, 2009, though at the time no channel format or schedule change occurred. On September 10, 2010, Bell Canada (a minority shareholder in CTVglobemedia) announced that it planned to acquire 100% interest in CTVglobemedia for a total debt and equity transaction cost of $3.2 billion CAD. The deal, which acquired CRTC approval, was approved on March 7, 2011 and closed on April of that year, CTVglobemedia was renamed Bell Media on April 1, 2011.

On October 3, 2011, CTV News Channel unveiled a new weekday programming lineup, which added three new news segments to the schedule (Direct, Express and National Affairs) and introduced four new news anchors.

Fourth logo, used from 2011 to 2019.

On December 19, 2011, CTV News Channel underwent a major overhaul which consisted of a new logo, a new on-air presentation designed by Troika Design Group, and a newly renovated studio set as the channel began production in high definition for the first time. An HD feed was launched on the channel's co-owned Bell Fibe TV service in February 2012. The set still consists of the traditional CTV newsroom background.

On July 5, 2017, CTV News Channel relaunched with a new look and automation package utilizing Super Ticker and Brando provided by Bannister Lake Software, a software application company located in Cambridge, Ontario.

== Programs ==
CTV News Channel broadcasts as an all-news format, consisting of local, regional, national and international news. The channel draws contents from the CTV News newsrooms across Canada. It simulcasts Your Morning from the main CTV channel on weekdays from 6:00 a.m. to 9:00 a.m., CTV National News nightly at 10:00 p.m. and weekends at 11:00 p.m., Question Period with Vassy Kapelos on Sundays at 11:00 a.m. with an encore at 5:00 p.m., and the investigative journalism show W5 on Sundays at 7:00 p.m. It also provides by itself public affairs show Power Play weeknightly at 5:00 p.m. with an encore at 8:00 p.m., and the late night newscast CTV News Overnight weeknights at 10:30 p.m. Live rolling news programming are provided by rotating anchors at all other times, with weekend coverage being branded as CTV News Weekend. CTV News Channel starts looping programming (CTV National News on the hour and CTV News Overnight at half past) after 11:00 p.m. weekdays and 11:30 p.m. weekends.

== Revenue ==
According to the Canadian Communication's Monitoring Report - Broadcasting System 2014, there were 8.4 million subscribers to the channel and revenue of $26 million.

== Notable current on–air staff ==
=== Anchors ===
- Todd van der Heyden
- Marcia MacMillan
- Sandie Rinaldo
- Vassy Kapelos
- Omar Sachedina

=== Reporters ===
- Avis Favaro – medical specialist
- Joyce Napier – Ottawa bureau chief
- Lloyd Robertson – chief correspondent (semi-retired; also the former voice-over of CTV News Channel)

==== Foreign correspondents ====
- Joy Malbon – Washington, D.C. bureau chief
- Paul Workman – London bureau chief

== Notable former on–air staff ==
- Tom Kennedy – former London bureau chief
- Dan Matheson
- Lisa LaFlamme
- Roger Smith – former Ottawa bureau chief (retired)
- Seamus O'Regan
- Don Martin
- Craig Oliver – former chief political correspondent
- Janis Mackey Frayer – Beijing bureau chief (now at NBC News)
- Jennifer Burke
- Beverly Thomson

== High-definition feed ==
On December 19, 2011, CTV News Channel began broadcasting in high definition, although a dedicated HD feed was not launched until February 16, 2012. It is available on all major television providers in the country.
