= Daniele Hamamdjian =

Egyptian television journalist

Daniele Hamamdjian is a London-based NBC News Foreign Correspondent. Since joining the network in 2024, Hamamdjian has covered a wide range of stories, including multiple assignments to the Israeli-Gaza war and the humanitarian crisis, Europe's historic heatwave, the wildfires outside Paris, interviews with Afghan women defying the Taliban's ban on their education, and Celine Dion's long-awaited return to the stage.

Before joining NBC, Daniele Hamamdjian spent nearly 10 years with CTV News in their London Bureau. She is most noted as a two-time Canadian Screen Award nominee, receiving nominations for Best National Reporter at the 7th Canadian Screen Awards in 2019 for her reporting on the Rohingya conflict, and Best Editorial Research at the 10th Canadian Screen Awards in 2022 for her W5 documentary feature Consumed by Conspiracy.

Born in Cairo, Egypt, Hamamdjian emigrated with her family to Laval, Quebec, in the 1980s. She studied journalism at Concordia University, and joined CTV in 2006 as a local reporter for the network's Montreal affiliate CFCF-DT, before transferring to the parliamentary bureau in Ottawa in 2009.
