= Harvey Kirck =

Canadian news anchor (1928–2002)

Harvey Kirck (October 14, 1928 – February 18, 2002) was a Canadian news anchor. Born in Uno Park, near New Liskeard, Ontario, Kirck moved with his family to Toronto in 1943.

== Radio days ==
His career began in radio at Sault Ste. Marie's CJIC in 1948, then on to CKBB in Barrie, Ontario, CKXL in Calgary, Alberta, and CKEY and CHUM in Toronto in the 1940s and 1950s.

== Television career ==
He joined CHCH in Hamilton in 1960, and then moved to CTV in 1963. He joined the CTV National News in 1963 as co-anchor replacing Baden Langton who had joined ABC News. He initially co-anchored with Peter Jennings and Ab Douglas but when Jennings followed Langton to ABC, Kirck became sole anchor with Douglas doing inserts from Ottawa. In 1976, Kirck was joined by Lloyd Robertson, forming an anchoring team that remained until Kirck's retirement from the broadcast in 1984. From 1984 to 1987 he was a host on W5. He also hosted Sketches of Our Town from the mid 1980s to early 1990s.

Kirck was one of the longest-serving newsmen in North America, and was inducted into the Canadian Association of Broadcasters Hall of Fame in 2000. He died of congestive heart failure two years later at the age of 73.

== Personal ==
Kirck was married three times (Maggie m 1947, Renate m 1962) and was survived by wife Brenda (m. 1983) and three children.
