= Michael Cooke (journalist) =

Journalist and publishing executive

- Born: ~1953; England
- Occupation: Editor
- Spouse: Lisa LaFlamme

Michael Cooke is a journalist and publishing executive. He was the editor of the Toronto Star, Canada's largest-circulation daily newspaper.

== Life and career ==
Cooke was born and raised in England. Cooke was first employed "in a small English coastal town" before making the move to Fleet Street.

=== Move to Canada ===
Cooke then secured work in Canada as a copy editor for the Toronto Star from 1974–77, where he finished as Assistant National Editor.

He moved from Toronto to joined the Montreal Gazette in 1977 as assistant city editor. While serving as city editor, he was awarded a 1982 Southam fellowship, providing eight months of study at the University of Toronto. He then took a position as a joint managing editor for the Gazette.

In 1992, he was appointed managing editor of the Edmonton Journal.

In 1995 he transferred to assume the role of editor at the Vancouver Province. His focus on entertainment journalism and readership at the expense of other reporting has been discussed by journalism scholars. He drew protests from within his own newsroom for what some described as "blatant political interference," such as ordering a professor's comments be removed from a story because they were too "left-wing." Under his leadership, the team surpassed the Vancouver Sun in readership and became the largest newspaper in British Columbia.

He became involved as a founding editor of the 1998 creation of the National Post newspaper, and worked as the Editor-in-Chief of the Financial Post over the summer months as it prepared for the merger with the new publication. He still maintained his position with the Province for the next two years, before leaving for the United States.

=== Move to Chicago Sun-Times ===
In 2000, Cooke was appointed Editor of the Chicago Sun-Times, replacing outgoing editor Nigel Wade to whom he had been favourably compared, at the invitation of David Radler. On January 18, 2000 he gave a lecture at the University of British Columbia entitled "Where To Get Story Ideas Your Boss Will Love".

In 2001, he chaired a 500-seat dinner to honor Martin Luther King Jr. The following year, he was thanked in Steve Neal's preface to his compilation Eleanor and Harry: The Correspondence of Eleanor Roosevelt and Harry S. Truman. In 2003 he was among those thanked by author Jim DeRogatis in the preface to his own book, Milk It: Collected Musings on the Alternative Music Explosion of the 90s, as he had worked under Cooke as a music critic.

In 2003, he was called to justify overseeing the publication of the identity and personal details of Chicago Cubs fan Steve Bartman after a foul-up at a playoffs game lost the baseball team its chance at a championship win. Under his direction, the paper "leaned increasingly on traditional tabloid newspaper staples: aggressive city reporting, heavy doses of sports and celebrities, and lots of pictures of scantily clad women", while still publishing its "important exposés".

In 2005, he was again thanked in the opening to Knocking Down Barriers and The Immortal Bobby.

=== Move to New York Daily News ===
Cooke joined the New York Daily News in February 2005 to fill the vacancy left by Ed Kosner who had retired more than a year earlier. His new position was blamed for several staff members' resignations and editorial gaffes including the re-printing of a story he had written in Chicago.

He described the paper's on-going rivalry with the New York Post stating "We put our foot on their throat every day and press down till their eyes bulge and leak blood, but still they won't die. We just have to keep at it till they do die". This came after the Post had referred to him as "the Cookie Monster for the News" However, after ten months he began to clash with Editorial Director Martin Dunn whom he described as "controlling", and eventually left the paper in 2005.

=== Return to Chicago ===
Cooke returned to the Sun-Times where he was promoted to oversee approximately a hundred subsidiary papers. Both Mike Houlihan and Richard Roeper mentioned Cooke in prefaces to their 2008 books. He remained with the Sun-Times through 2009, and explained his belief in tabloid pagination stating that a front page requires two of the following: Power of presentation; humor; emotion; and attitude.

=== Return to Toronto Star ===
He left Sun-Media, to return to the Star where he took over as editor, while Don Hayner replaced him in Chicago. Maclean's columnist Paul Wells wrote in his defence that Cooke "was obsessed with declining readership, declining market penetration, the increasing reluctance of younger generations to take up the newspaper-reading habit", and noted that the Star stood a better chance of success with Cooke at its helm. In April 2009, he joined the International Newspaper Marketing Association. Cooke also sits on the board of Journalists for Human Rights.
