= Stephen Smart =

Stephen Smart is a former Canadian journalist who worked in public relations for the provincial government of British Columbia until the swearing-in of the new BC NDP government of Premier John Horgan on (or shortly thereafter) July 18, 2017. He served as former Premier Christy Clark's Press Secretary and reporting to the Executive Director of Communications and Issues Management. Subsequent to that, he was named Press Secretary in the office of the Leader of the Official Opposition.

Born and raised in Vancouver, British Columbia, he graduated from the Broadcast Journalism program at British Columbia Institute of Technology. After working as a producer on radio station CKNW for seven years, he joined CTV News as a reporter in 2007.

Smart won a B.C. Association of Broadcasters Best Reporting Award for his radio reporting of the BC Ferries 'Queen of the North' sinking in 2006. He also won a Gold Ribbon Award from the Canadian Association of Broadcasters for his coverage of the Robert Pickton trial in New Westminster in 2007.

Smart left CTV in 2010 to work for CBC as a legislative reporter. In 2012, CBC Ombudsman Kirk LaPointe responded to a public complaint about a possible conflict of interest because Smart reported about politics before and after marrying Rebecca Scott who had joined the provincial government as deputy press secretary for Premier Christy Clark. Fellow journalists defended Smart but CBC's ombudsman found that the broadcaster's legislative reporter's marriage to BC Premier's deputy press secretary Rebecca Scott put him in violation of the public broadcaster's journalistic standards and practices.

In 2014, Smart left the legislature's press gallery in Victoria to transfer to Vancouver public relations sector. Smart worked with the Citizen Relations public relations firm until being hired as the press secretary for Premier Christy Clark in early 2016.
