= Gail Smith (journalist) =

Canadian journalist

- Born: September 4, 1955 (age 70)
- Education: University of Western Ontario (BA); Carleton University (MA)
- Occupations: Television news anchor; journalist
- Years active: 1978 – 1988, 1993
- Employer(s): CTV Television Network; CHUM Limited
- Parents: Conrad Smith (father); Mary Smith (mother)

Gail Smith (born September 4, 1955) is a former Canadian television journalist and news anchor. She is best known for her work at CFTO-TV, the flagship station of the CTV Television Network in Toronto, where she anchored the supper-hour program World Beat News from 1984 to 1988.

== Early life and education ==
Smith was born in Moncton, New Brunswick, the eldest daughter of Mary (née Milner) and Conrad Smith, a school teacher. In 1958, her family moved to Trenton, Ontario, where her father taught mathematics at Trenton High School. She was raised in Trenton with her three younger sisters.

Smith earned a bachelor's degree in mathematics from the University of Western Ontario. During her undergraduate studies, she developed an interest in social issues, particularly feminism, which led her to pursue a career in journalism. She subsequently earned a Master of Arts degree in journalism from Carleton University.

== Early career at BCTV News (1978–1982) ==
Smith joined CTV-owned BCTV in Vancouver in 1978, three weeks after graduating. As a television news reporter, producer, and anchor, she covered a range of hard-news stories, developing an interest in political affairs and coroner's inquests. In 1981, she delivered early-morning news updates on the national morning television program Canada AM.

== News anchor at CFTO News (1982–1988) ==
In February 1982, Smith joined CFTO in Toronto as a television reporter. Her rapid advancement at the station occurred during a period in which Toronto television news outlets were competing to hire women as news anchors in an effort to expand viewership.

=== Night Beat News and World Beat News ===
Seven months after joining CFTO, Smith debuted as the weekend anchor for the station's early-evening and late-night newscasts on September 4, 1982, becoming the first woman and first full-time anchor to hold that position at CFTO. In that role, she wrote and presented four weekend newscasts, produced two of them, and worked as a reporter on three additional days each week. Following a 55 per cent year-over-year increase in ratings for CFTO's weekend news program, she became the station's first female late-night news anchor on Night Beat News in 1983. On August 20, 1984, she joined Tom Gibney as co-anchor of the station's early-evening one-hour newscast, World Beat News, then the highest-rated television news program in the Toronto market.

Among her assignments, Smith reported live on the opening of Roy Thomson Hall. She also co-anchored CFTO's election-night coverage of the 1984 Canadian federal election and co-hosted television specials with Reverend Jacques Monet during Pope John Paul II’s 1984 visit to Canada, covering events in Toronto and Midland, Ontario.

=== 1986 trial ===
In September 1985, Smith was charged with assault after Maria Barbeiro, a CFTO studio cleaner, alleged that she had been injured when Smith closed a dressing-room door that struck her face. The trial at Scarborough Provincial Court began on March 13, 1986, and Smith was acquitted four days later due to insufficient evidence.

=== 1988 lockout ===
During a 12-week lockout at CFTO that began on June 7, 1988, Smith continued anchoring newscasts after crossing the picket line, despite being a member of the National Association of Broadcast Employees and Technicians (NABET), the union involved in the dispute. In the second week of the dispute, NABET filed a complaint with the Canadian Radio-television and Telecommunications Commission, alleging that her reporting reflected management’s perspective. The complaint was withdrawn after the lockout ended on August 31, 1988.

=== Departure ===
Smith had planned to leave CFTO in March 1988 but remained at the request of management until the station's contract negotiations with its union were resolved. By October, she had grown fatigued and decided to pursue other opportunities in television. Her final broadcast of World Beat News aired on October 21, 1988.

== Late career at CKVR News (1993) ==
After developing an interest in the programming style of CHUM-owned CITY-TV in Toronto, Smith returned briefly to broadcasting in 1993 following a nearly five-year absence from television news. She joined CHUM-owned CKVR-TV in Barrie, Ontario, as a newscaster on the midday edition of Total News, making her debut on March 3, 1993.
