= Paul Hunter (journalist) =

Canadian television journalist

Paul Hunter is a Canadian television journalist for CBC News reporting from Washington, D.C., mainly on American politics. Hunter has reported from numerous places across Canada and the world, both as a reporter and correspondent reporting on events including the prime ministerships of Stephen Harper and Paul Martin, the Haiti earthquake, the inauguration of Barack Obama, the Montreal ice storm of 1998, the trial of Paul Bernardo and the American occupation of Iraq. In 2008 he was embedded for two months with Canadian troops in Afghanistan. His report "The Fundamental Day", which brought attention to the conservative religious views of Canadian Alliance leader Stockwell Day, was noted as a turning point in the 2000 Canadian federal election.

Hunter is married to Canadian journalist Joy Malbon, Washington bureau chief for CTV News. The CBC has assigned him to Washington as part of the 2009 changing of the guard in their Ottawa bureau.

He won the Canadian Screen Award for Best National Reporter at the 7th Canadian Screen Awards in 2019.
