= Christopher Curtis (journalist) =

Canadian journalist

- Born: October 6, 1985 (age 40); Montreal, Quebec, Canada
- Occupation: Journalist
- Known for: Investigative reporting, Indigenous affairs

Christopher Curtis (born 6 October 1985) is an English-Canadian journalist based in Montreal. He is bilingual in French.

== Career ==
Curtis spent nine years at the Montreal Gazette, where he developed an expertise in reporting on marginalized communities and Indigenous issues.

During this period, he covered the 2018 Quebec provincial election campaign, where he was the only anglophone journalist aboard the Parti Québécois campaign bus. His offbeat presence and humour earned him the nickname chouchou (darling) of the bus, and he was invited onto the TVA political program La Joute to share his unique perspective on the sovereigntist party.

He left the Gazette to found The Rover, a reader-funded investigative journalism project, in collaboration with Ricochet Media. This allowed him to dedicate himself fully to long-form reporting, particularly on Indigenous peoples in Quebec, which he consideres underserved by mainstream media due to a lack of time and resources.

== Awards and distinctions ==
- Judith Jasmin Award (2022): Curtis won the Judith Jasmin Award in the Sports category for his article "Du basket au pays du hockey", published in L'actualité on October 5, 2022.
- Canadian Association of Journalists Award, Online Media (2020): Curtis and his colleague Virginie Ann won the Online Media category award for their investigation "Threats, fines and fear: A dump on Mohawk land overflows with industrial waste", published in Ricochet and The Eastern Door.
- Canadian Association of Journalists Award, Indigenous Reconciliation (2019): Curtis received the APTN/CAJ Reconciliation Award for his portfolio of reporting published in the Montreal Gazette.
