= Dana Lewis (broadcaster) =

Canadian journalist

Dana Lewis is a Canadian News Correspondent based in London, and the host of podcast BACK STORY. He is also a reporter appearing on TRT World, LBC Radio, ABC News Australia, and numerous American radio programs.

He was formerly with Fox News, NBC News, CBS News, CBC News and CTV National News Canada. He was also a contributor to Al Jazeera America reporting on the Paris attacks, the election in Ukraine, the 70th anniversary of D-Day, and current developments in Iraq. He is currently a frequent commentator/Correspondent on TRTWORLD and other outlets.

Based in London he is completely independent. He has completed half hour shows in depth reports, as a host and reporter on such complex issues as BREXIT, Nuclear issues, and American Foreign Policy. Lewis has covered the World including the current war in the Middle East, the hotel suicide bombings in Amman, Jordan, and updates following the London terrorist attacks. In 2003, Lewis was an embedded reporter with the 101st Airborne in Iraq; he was also embedded with U.S. forces along the Pakistan border and in Helmand Province. Lewis is considered an expert on Russia having lived there for 12 years. He has covered China, the Middle East, and Central and Eastern Europe. He speaks English and Russian.

== History ==
Lewis was born in Toronto, Ontario. He attended York University and the Fanshawe College Broadcast Journalism program. He is a graduate of The Fanshawe College Journalism program.

Prior to joining Al Jazeera and Fox News, Lewis worked for a number of different news programs and networks, including NBC Nightly News, CTV News and CBC News, and was a crime reporter for CFTR/CHFI Radio in Toronto.

Dana anchored the CTV National News and was Prime Time anchor of the 24 hour News Channel. He was also the main 6 o clock anchor for CBC News Edmonton. Later, he became a National News Report in Canada for CTV first based in Edmonton, then Toronto and then overseas.

During the 1990s, Lewis was the Jerusalem-based Middle East Bureau Chief/Correspondent for CTV. He was based in Jerusalem for 6 full years. Later while working for NBC he came under fire while in a car in Ramallah during the Israeli siege of Yasser Arafat's compound, and narrowly escaped injury. He also covered the invasion of Somalia by U.S. forces, and the first Gulf War.

He was embedded with the 101st Airborne Division during the invasion of Iraq in 2003 reporting for NBC News and DateLine NBC and MSNBC.

Lewis was one of the first reporters to enter Afghanistan after September 11 and has been embedded with the 82nd Airborne and 10th Mountain division in Afghanistan, the 101st Airborne and U.S. Marines there.

== Awards and recognitions ==
Dana Lewis has an Emmy nomination for a story on Russian orphans, and the prestigious Overseas Press Club award for War in Kosovo. He also holds various RTNDA awards. And was honored for his coverage of the Kursk Submarine disaster in Russia.

He was featured in Robin Moore's (French Connection) new book Hunting Down Saddam. He also was a guest lecturer at the Prestigious U.S. Naval War College on media affairs. Lewis was one of the first reporters to interview General David Petraeus (Later Director of the CIA) and followed him through the Iraq War's early days.

Lewis has interviewed President Putin and is one of the longest serving western reporters to be based in Russia. He also interviewed among others King Hussein of Jordan, Israeli leader Netanyahu, and Shimon Peres.

Lewis has earned recognition for a number of different stories he has covered in his career, including Overseas Press Club awards for his coverage of the war in Kosovo and the Kursk submarine disaster in Russia. He was nominated for an Emmy Award for coverage of Russian Orphans, and has also received various RTNDA awards for spot news coverage.

The Dana Lewis Front Line Award is annually presented to graduating journalism students.

== Personal life ==
Dana Lewis is married to Victoria. They have two sons, Alex and Daniel.
