= Molly Lyons Bar-David =

Canadian-born Israeli journalist

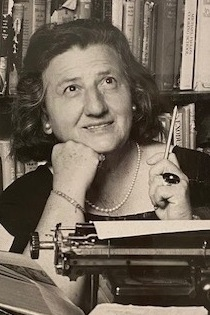

Molly Lyons Bar-David (pen name, M.X.L.; née, Lyons; Hebrew: מולי ליונס בר-דוד, 1910-1987) was a Canadian-born Israeli journalist and cookbook author, who served as culinary advisor to El-Al Airlines. Her Folklore Cook Book (1964; international title, The Israeli Cook Book), containing 750 recipes, was the first cookbook to include recipes from multiple Israeli ethnic groups as well as the Jewish diaspora.

== Early life ==
Molly Lyons (nickname, "Malka") was born in Saskatchewan, on July 3, 1910. Her parents emigrated to Canada from Russia.

== Career ==
Bar-David was a food columnist for the Jerusalem Post, and for more than twenty years, she wrote the "Diary of an Israeli Housewife" column for Hadassah Magazine. She wrote for many Canadian newspapers including Junior Hadassah, Palestine Illustrator News,Saskatchewan Jewish Post, The Jewish Advocate, Tisdale Recorder, and Woman’s Wear (Toronto).

She published four non-fiction books, including Women in Israel (1952), with a preface by Naomi Ben-Asher, and a memoir, My Promised Land (1953). She also published three cookbooks: Folklore Cook Book (1964), whose international title was, The Israeli Cookbook (1968).; and Jewish Cooking for Pleasure (1965).

== Personal life and death ==
In 1936, she migrated to Palestine.

In 1939, she married Jaap Bar-David, a literary agent.

Molly Lyons Bar-David died on October 21, 1987; interment was in Savyon, Israel.

== Selected works ==
=== Cookbooks ===
- The Folkloric Cookbook, 1964 (National Library of Israel, 990018517530205171)
- Jewish Cooking for Pleasure, 1965 ISBN 9780600021049
- The Israeli Cook Book: What's Cooking In Israel's Melting Pot, 1964 ASIN B0045KA61O

=== Non-fiction ===
- Women in Israel, 1952 ASIN B07NDM87VZ
- My Promised Land, 1953 ASIN B0007DPAEG
- That’s How it is With Us
- The Path to Losing Weight
