= Sandie Rinaldo =

Canadian journalist and anchor

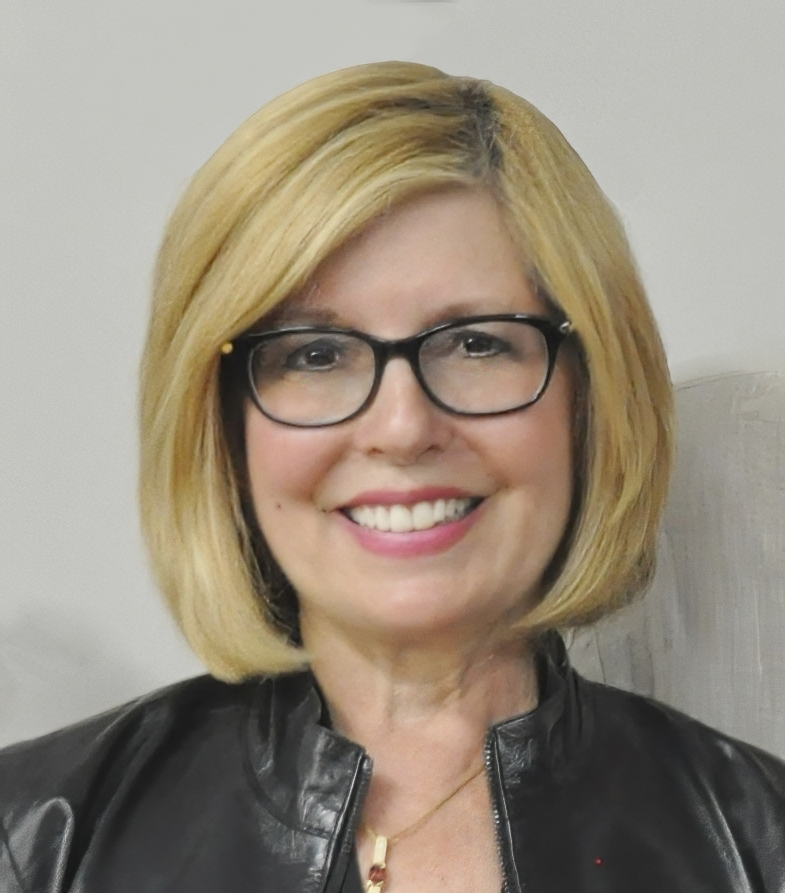
- Born: Sandra Brycks; 16 January 1950 (age 76); Toronto, Ontario, Canada
- Education: York University (BA)
- Occupations: Television news anchor; journalist
- Years active: 1973–present
- Employer: CTV News
- Spouse: Michael Rinaldo (d. 2005)
- Children: 3

Sandra Rinaldo, née Brycks (born 16 January 1950) is a Canadian television journalist and anchor for CTV News.

== Youth and education ==
She was born in Toronto, and was first seen on television as a dancer during the mid-1960s on CBC Television youth series such as Where It's At. Rinaldo graduated from York University's Fine Arts program with an Honours Bachelor of Arts in 1973.

== Broadcasting career ==
A week after graduation, Rinaldo joined CTV Television Network's news division, initially working as a junior secretary to Donald Cameron, director of news. She later advanced to production manager then research for W5, as well as reporting for CTV National News and Canada AM. She became anchor for the newscasts on Canada AM in 1980, making her the first woman in Canada to hold a full-time position as a national news anchor. During her broadcasting career she interviewed several top celebrities including John Candy, Gordon Lightfoot and Bob Marley. In 1985 she became weekend anchor of CTV National News, a post she has held ever since, except for a brief period from 1989 to 1991 during which she was co-anchor with Tom Gibney of the local World Beat News on the network's Toronto affiliate CFTO.

Since longtime weekday anchor Lloyd Robertson's retirement in 2011, Rinaldo served as substitute anchor for Robertson's successor, Lisa LaFlamme, on the main weekday national newscast. Since 2009, she has been anchoring CTV News Channel three weekday afternoons. As of 2010, she is also a co-host of W5 and a contributing reporter.

In 2023, she marked her 50th anniversary of working for CTV, with the network broadcasting a one-hour retrospective special about her career on May 12. In the same year, CTV launched a new early edition of CTV National News, to air at 5:30 p.m. with Rinaldo as anchor.

== Personal life ==
She was married to Michael Rinaldo (c. 1945–2005) until his death, and has three daughters. She is Jewish and the daughter of Holocaust survivors.

== Awards ==
A list of awards won by Rinaldo:

- Bryden Alumni Award, York University (2005)
- RTNDA award for Best Newscast for coverage (1999)
- World Medal from the International Film and TV Festival, New York (1997)
- Finalist Certificate for Best News Anchor, International Film and TV Festival, New York (1991)
- Silver Medal for Best Coverage of an Ongoing News Story, International Film and TV Festival, New York (1991)
- Silver Medal, Best Coverage of an Ongoing News Story, International Film and TV Festival, New York (1991)
- Bronze Medal, Best News Anchor, International Film & TV Festival, New York (1990)
- Silver Medal, Best Analysis of a Single Current News Story, Houston International Film Festival (1990)
- American Film & Video Award for "Childbirth From Inside-Out" (1990)
