= Tom Kennedy (journalist) =

Canadian television journalist (born 1952)

- Born: April 12, 1952 (age 74); St. John's, Newfoundland and Labrador
- Education: Memorial University of Newfoundland; Ryerson Polytechnical Institute (now Toronto Metropolitan University)
- Occupation: Journalist
- Spouse(s): Sylvie Goulet (1980-div.); Dawna Friesen (div.)

Tom Kennedy (born April 12, 1952) is a former Canadian television journalist, who was associated over the course of his career with both CBC News and CTV News.

Born in St. John's, Newfoundland, Kennedy was educated at Memorial University of Newfoundland and at Ryerson Polytechnical Institute where he received a Bachelor of Arts in journalism. He began working at The Globe and Mail as an editor and reporter. He then moved on to CBC News in 1976 where he spent the next twenty-five years.

He was one of the few Canadian journalists present when the crisis in Tiananmen Square hit in Beijing, in June 1989. He won the Gemini Award for Best News Reportage at the 4th Gemini Awards, for his coverage of Tiananmen Square. He later won a second Gemini Award for Best News Reportage at the 14th Gemini Awards in 1999.

In 2001, he became the CTV News bureau chief in London, England and spent the next dozen years covering major international events. Beginning in 2012, he was based out of Toronto, doing documentaries for CTV's newsmagazine series W5, for which he won a Canadian Screen Award for Best Host or Interviewer in a News or Information Program or Series at the 3rd Canadian Screen Awards in 2015. He left CTV in 2015, following a round of staffing cutbacks.

He was formerly married to Global National anchor Dawna Friesen, and is now divorced.
