= Rosie DiManno =

Canadian journalist

Rosie DiManno (born c. 1956) is a Canadian journalist who has worked at the Toronto Star since beginning her career in 1975. In 2012 the Canadian Olympic Committee honoured DiManno for covering over 10 Olympic games.

== Life and career ==
DiManno was born in Toronto to Italian immigrants. She began her career as a sportswriter in 1975. DiManno has been a columnist with the Toronto Star since 1989. Though she continues to write material for the Star sports section, including game coverage of Toronto Blue Jays baseball and Toronto Maple Leafs hockey, her column is much more wide ranging, generally offering opinion and commentary on current local, national or international news stories. Because of her coverage of both sports and current affairs, it is not unusual for DiManno to generate a few thousand words of material for the Star daily.

DiManno is author of several books, including Glory Jays: Canada's World Series Champions, a 1993 book about The Toronto Blue Jays' World Series-winning season, Rosie and the Leafs, a 2000 book about the Toronto Maple Leafs, and Coach: The Pat Burns Story, a biography of National Hockey League Pat Burns.

Claire Sibonney of the Ryerson Review of Journalism described DiManno as a "provocative and unpredictable bad girl". DiManno's writing style has occasionally attracted negative attention internationally.

On July 13, 2016, DiManno was arrested and charged with assault by the Ontario Provincial Police's Bancroft detachment stemming from an incident near Finnegan Lake. On January 10, 2017, the assault charge was dropped, according to DiManno's lawyer.

On August 19, 2020, an internal memo was sent to Toronto Star newsroom staff regarding the creation of a new internal ombud role. The position is the first of its kind at the Toronto Star, allowing for all journalists to have a safe space to express concerns of editorial-related discrimination and bias. DiManno responded in a reply-all email that the new role was a "fucking abomination," and has since been condemned for her "hateful, racist" comments in a subsequent letter to management that was signed by more than 60 Toronto Star employees.
