= David McGuffin =

Canadian journalist

David McGuffin is a veteran broadcast journalist, foreign correspondent, podcast host and producer. He is owner and founding producer of Explore Productions, based out of Ottawa, where he serves a wide range of institutional, Indigenous, corporate and journalism clients as a host, producer and trainer. He is a fellow of the Royal Canadian Geographical Society, contributing editor at Canadian Geographic magazine and host of Canadian Geographic's Explore Podcast. He has taught podcasting at the Carleton School of Journalism.

McGuffin spent over twenty years working internationally as a foreign correspondent and senior producer for some of the world's leading news organizations, including CBC News, NPR, BBC, NBC, ABC News, PBS Newshour, CTV News among many others. Prior to founding Explore Productions in 2018, he was a Supervising Producer with National Public Radio in Washington, DC, guiding its award winning national news and current affairs program Morning Edition. There he helped lead international news coverage and on the ground political reporting, including the 2016 primaries and US Presidential election. He was part of the launch of team of Up First, one of the world's most listened to daily news podcasts.

In 2010, he helped launch Voice of America's South Sudan radio service, as its Managing Editor.

From 2004 until 2010 he was the Africa Correspondent for the Canadian Broadcasting Corporation, reporting for its television, radio and digital news services. From his base in Nairobi, Kenya, he re-asserted CBC's presence on the continent, regularly reporting from conflict zones in Darfur, Mali, the Democratic Republic of Congo, Somalia, as well as Afghanistan. He also covered a wide range of social, economic, and cultural issues affecting Africa, travelling from Timbuktu to Mogadishu, Khartoum to Cape Town. In his work, he covered Nelson Mandela's final international tour as South African President, interviewed Nobel Peace Prize Winner Desmond Tutu, as well as sports stars, Grammy award winning artists, business leaders, activists and indicted war criminals.

His last assignment for the CBC was the 2010 FIFA World Cup in South Africa. The CBC closed the Africa bureau in April 2012 after the federal government chopped $115 million from its Parliamentary grant.

McGuffin also previously served as the bureau chief in Moscow for Feature Story News, a British broadcast news agency, during the last tumultuous years of the Yeltsin era and the rise of Vladimir Putin. His reports from the former Soviet Union aired on National Public Radio, CBC News, ABC Radio News and PBS. In 2000, he opened FSN's Beijing bureau, before joining CTV News as its Beijing bureau chief and Asia correspondent, reporting from across the continent, including in North Korea.

During a two-year stint in Rome, he also reported for ABC News and NBC News, on Vatican and European affairs. His reports aired on NBC Nightly News, MSNBC and ABC Radio.

His first job in journalism was for the MacNeil–Lehrer Newshour on PBS. He was part of the team that launched the NewsHour's award-winning digital site and he oversaw the NewsHour's digital foreign coverage.

He graduated from Trent University, the journalism program at the University of King's College and Lisgar Collegiate Institute.
