= Bill Cunningham (journalist) =

Canadian journalist (1932–2024)

William Robert Cunningham (10 July 1932 – 31 January 2024) was a Canadian television journalist, who was associated at different times in his career with the CTV, CBC and Global networks.

Originally from Yarmouth, Nova Scotia, he began his journalism career in 1954, working for the Times & Transcript, local radio stations in New Brunswick, and Broadcast News before joining the CBC. He was executive producer of The National in the 1960s, and spearheaded the change in CBC's policies which saw the position of anchor transferred from a voice announcer to an actual professional journalist, resulting in Stanley Burke succeeding Earl Cameron as anchor of the program in 1965. He was CBC Television's Vietnam War correspondent in the late 1960s, and was promoted to head of network news by 1972. After just a year in that job, however, he left to head the news department at the fledgling Global network, holding that role until 1980.

Cunningham then moved to CTV as executive producer of W5, and moved back into an on-air role with that series in 1983. In 1991, he was laid off from CTV as part of a decision to refocus W5 more squarely on journalist Eric Malling. He then returned to the CBC as a foreign correspondent and host of documentary programming for CBC Newsworld and Newsworld International.

Cunningham was a media spokesperson for Dying with Dignity, a Canadian assisted suicide advocacy organization.

Cunningham died on 31 January 2024, at the age of 91.
