= Wei Chen (journalist) =

Canadian journalist

Wei Chen is a Canadian television and radio journalist. Born in Taiwan, she started her career with stations in London and Hamilton. She has worked for the Canadian Broadcasting Corporation before moving to Canada AM, the morning show at the CTV Television Network. She was also an anchor on CTV News Channel and a correspondent for the network's newsmagazine series W5, receiving Gemini Award nominations in 2000 and 2002 for her work with W5.

In 2003, Chen left CTV to work for independent station CKXT-DT as anchor of its daytime news program Toronto Today. The program was cancelled after only eight months on the air, and Chen was reassigned as a reporter for the primetime magazine program Toronto Tonight until that program was also cancelled in 2005.

She then joined CBC Television and worked at TV stations in Calgary, Ottawa and Toronto until January 2007, when she became the new host of CBC Radio One's Ontario Morning, the network's local morning show for non-metropolitan markets in Southern Ontario, until 2022. She lives in Toronto with her husband Michael Pollard and daughter (Jensen), who she adopted in 2003.
