= Jennifer Burke =

Canadian journalist

Jennifer Burke, née Lo, also known as Jennifer Mather, is a Gemini-award-winning Canadian television journalist, previously a national news anchor for CTV News Channel in Toronto.

For years Burke was a reporter and anchor for television stations in Vancouver, British Columbia, including weekend news anchor on CHAN-TV, coanchor on CKVU-TV and host of CBC Television's Living Vancouver. She also hosted The Jennifer Mather Show on CKNW, an afternoon radio call-in talk show focusing on news and politics. Her early radio career included the role of morning news anchor on The Bob Saye and Stirling Faux Show on CFMI-FM.

In April 2013, Burke moderated the leaders' debate in the 2013 provincial election in British Columbia.

In April 2017, Burke once again moderated the leaders' debate in BC.

She was married to NHL executive Brian Burke and the couple have two daughters.

She also served as one of the fill-in anchors for CTV Canada AM.

On 15 August 2022, Burke refused to read a statement about the firing of fellow CTV anchor Lisa LaFlamme. She left the network soon after, and has since joined communications firm Pivotal Media.
