= Merle Shain =

Canadian author and journalist

Merle Shain (1935–1989) was a Canadian author and journalist.

Shain was born in Toronto, and graduated from the University of Toronto, with a BA (1957) and BSW (1959).

As a journalist, Shain worked as a feature writer for the Toronto Telegram, as an associate editor of the magazine Chatelaine, and as a columnist for the Toronto Sun. Shain also worked as a television presenter, hosting the CTV news program W5. For four years, she was a member of the board of the National Film Board of Canada.

She lived and wrote in Toronto until her sudden death in March, 1989, at the age of 53.

== Selected works ==
- Some Men Are More Perfect Than Others
- When Lovers Are Friends
- Hearts That We Broke Long Ago
- Courage My Love.
