= Jennifer Ward (journalist) =

Canadian broadcast journalist

Jennifer Ward (born October 8, 1957) is a Canadian broadcast journalist, and an anchor with CTV News Channel since 1999.

Ward joined Toronto's CFTO in August 1988 as a reporter and was promoted to news anchor in September. She then moved to Philadelphia, Pennsylvania, U.S. in July 1991 to become anchor and reporter for KYW-TV. In this role she worked as the first solo female anchor for the evening news in Philadelphia. Five years later she moved to co-host Fox Television's morning program Good Day Philadelphia, which lasted until 1999. In this role, she won two Emmys.

As of 2014, she works as a news anchor for the national cable channel CTV News Channel and CTV's Canada AM. Ward is the morning weekend anchor on CTV News Channel, as well as a regular anchor on Canada AM.
