= Omar Sachedina =

Canadian television reporter (born 1982)

- Sachedina in 2026
- Born: August 21, 1982 (age 44); Vancouver, British Columbia, Canada
- Education: McGill University; Columbia University
- Occupations: Television news anchor Television journalist Senior editor
- Years active: 2006–present
- Employer: Bell Media
- Television: CTV National News (2009–present)
- Term: Chief anchor and senior editor of CTV National News (2022–present)
- Predecessor: Lisa LaFlamme

Omar Sachedina (born August 21, 1982) is a Canadian journalist and news anchor for CTV News. He is currently serving as the chief anchor and senior editor for CTV's national evening newscast CTV National News since September 5, 2022. Previously, Sachedina served as the National Affairs Correspondent for CTV News.

== Early life and education ==
Sachedina was born and raised in Vancouver to Ismaili Muslim parents who immigrated to Canada as Indians from Uganda. His great-grandparents immigrated to Africa from India in the late 1800s. He speaks Gujarati, Kutchi, French, and English. At age 12, he grew an interest in journalism and submitted letters to the editors at various publications. Curious about his parents' East African homeland, Sachedina travelled there in 2005 to report and produce a PBS Frontline Fellowship feature documentary titled Uganda: The Return, exploring the return of Asians to Uganda after the 1972 expulsion.

He and his family were the focus of a CTV News Special Presentation titled Expelled: My Roots in Uganda. It aired November 4, 2022.

He completed the International Baccalaureate Program while attending Port Moody Secondary School in Port Moody, British Columbia. He has a degree in Political Science and Philosophy from McGill University in Montreal, a Master of Science in Journalism from Columbia University in New York, and is a graduate of The Poynter Institute in St. Petersburg, Florida.

== Career ==
=== Early Start: CTV, CityTv and CP24 ===
While a student, he was an intern at Global News in Vancouver and Montreal. He began his broadcasting career as a reporter for CTV Northern Ontario. He joined Citytv in July 2006, working on newscasts for both CityNews and CP24, where he remained until 2008. While at CP24, Sachedina covered the 2009 Federal Budget from Ottawa, anchored the 2008 Canadian Federal Election night coverage, anchored the 2008 U.S. Presidential Election Night, and President Barack Obama's inauguration. Sachedina's work has appeared in the Vancouver Sun, The Province, Toronto Star, The Globe and Mail, and CBC Radio.

=== CTV National News ===
He joined CTV National News as a correspondent in Toronto in September 2009, and has covered many breaking national and international news stories. He covered the 2011 Norway attacks in Oslo, Norway, where 77 people were murdered at a youth camp by Anders Behring Breivik a domestic terrorist and Far-right extremist. In 2012, he reported breaking international news when he travelled to Newtown, Connecticut to cover the second deadliest school shooting in United States history, the Sandy Hook Elementary School shooting

He announced on Twitter on March 22, 2013, that he would be moving to Ottawa to assume the role of Parliamentary Correspondent. He returned to Toronto as National Affairs Correspondent for CTV National News in 2018, covering breaking news stories from around the world, including the Russian invasion of Ukraine and the ongoing war that followed.

He was a frequent guest host and reporter for CTV's morning news program Canada AM, and contributed to CTVNews.ca and CTV's W5. He also served frequently as a substitute anchor on CTV National News for Lisa LaFlamme and Sandie Rinaldo.

He has interviewed various notable Canadian figures which included Canadian Prime Minister Justin Trudeau, NDP leader Jagmeet Singh, Alberta Premier Danielle Smith, Governor General of Canada Mary Simon, former Governor General David Johnston, Television Host Alex Trebek and supreme court justice Mahmud Jamal, the first person of colour appointed to the Supreme Court of Canada.

On September 8, 2022, he announced the breaking news of the death of Queen Elizabeth II. He also reported from London and lead a CTV News Special coverage of the Coronation of Charles III and Camilla and interviewed House of Lords member Rumi Verjee.

In July 2024, he reported from the 2024 Republican National Convention in Milwaukee, Wisconsin and its president and vice president nominee and appointment of current U.S. president Donald Trump and JD Vance. The following month, he covered the 2024 Democratic National Convention from Chicago, Illinois and its presidential and vice presidential nomination and appointment of Kamala Harris and Tim Walz.

=== Career timeline ===
- 2004-2006: joined CITO-TV as a reporter
- 2006-2008: Reporter and News Anchor for CityNews and CP24
- 2009-2013: Toronto Correspondent for CTV National News
- 2013-2019: Parliamentary Correspondent for CTV National News
- 2013-2019: Fill-in host for CTV's political program Power Play
- 2019-2022: National Affairs Correspondent for CTV National News
- 2022: Appointed successor to Lisa LaFlamme as chief anchor and senior of CTV National News
- 2022-: Chief Anchor and Senior Editor CTV National News with Omar Sachedina

=== LaFlamme's dismissal controversy ===
On August 15, 2022, his predecessor Lisa LaFlamme posted a video on Twitter saying she was "blindsided" by Bell Media's decision not to renew her contract On the same day he was abruptly named chief news anchor and senior editor for CTV National News, replacing LaFlamme. He began anchoring the newscast on September 5, 2022. On the day of his first broadcast, he addressed the controversy regarding LaFlamme's abrupt departure from the newscast.

== Honors ==
He has received nominations for Best National Reporter at the Canadian Screen Awards. He was part of the CTV News team that received the 2020 RTNDA Canada Ron Laidlaw Award for continuing coverage of the opioid crisis. He also received a nomination for a Daily Excellence award for his coverage of the 2018 Indonesia earthquake and tsunami. In 2022, RTDNA recognized his story from Nunavik on the roots of Canada's first Indigenous Governor-General.

He is the recipient of the 2010 RTNDA Canada President's Fellowship.
