= Paul Workman (journalist) =

Canadian journalist

Paul Workman is a Canadian television journalist, who was the London bureau chief for CTV News until 2023. Prior to joining CTV News on July 13, 2006, he was a journalist for CBC News for over twenty years.

He won a Gemini Award for Best Reportage at the 11th Gemini Awards in 1997 for "Romanian Journey to Canada".

He has also been a Gemini Award or Canadian Screen Award nominee at the 9th Gemini Awards in 1995, the 15th Gemini Awards in 2000, and the 8th Canadian Screen Awards in 2020.

In 2024 he was named the recipient of the Gordon Sinclair Award, the lifetime achievement award for journalism, at the 12th Canadian Screen Awards.
