= Ab Douglas =

German-Canadian television news anchor (1930–2023)

Abraham Douglas Driediger (17 February 1930 – 21 March 2023) was a German-born Canadian television news anchor and journalist. He was CTV’s Parliamentary Bureau Chief and co-anchored the first CTV National News program with Baden Langdon (later with Peter Jennings) in November 1962. In 1967, he moved to CBC News where he produced documentaries and was a foreign correspondent based in Moscow until 1972, when he returned to Canada and was a national correspondent based in Edmonton and Vancouver. In 1980, he accepted a teaching position at the University of Regina School of Journalism. He also helped establish the Inuit Broadcasting Corporation in what is now Nunavut before retiring to run the family's cattle and horse ranch. In 1989, he left the ranch and moved to Kelowna.

Douglas died on 21 March 2023, at the age of 93.

== Writings ==
- Douglas, Ab (May 22, 2002). No Dancing God: Mennonite stories (2nd ed.). Markham: Fitzhenry & Whiteside. ISBN 978-1550566154.
- Douglas, Ab (August 15, 1993). On foreign assignment: The inside story of journalism's elite corps. Alberta: University of Alberta Press. ISBN 978-1550590579.
