= Nancy Wilson (journalist) =

Canadian television journalist

Nancy Wilson (born c. 1955) is a Canadian television journalist. She was an anchor for CBC News Now before her retirement.

She joined CBC Newsworld in 1991 as the host of This Country. Prior to joining, Wilson worked on CBC Television's newsmagazine The Journal. For the CBC, she has hosted various programmes including Newsworld Today, CBC News: Morning, Politics and The Money Show.

She was also a reporter, host and anchor for CTV's Canada AM, as well as the parliamentary bureau representative for the Global Television Network. For several years in the late 1980s she co-anchored evening newscasts on CJOH-TV in Ottawa with Max Keeping.

An Ottawa native, she graduated from Queen's University in Kingston, Ontario.

On May 8, 2014, Wilson announced that she would be retiring from CBC.
