= Baden Langton =

Former News Anchor

Baden Wesley Langton (1927 or 1928 — February 14, 2018) was one of several early co-anchors of CTV National News and later White House correspondent for ABC News.

Langton was born in Brantford, Ontario. He left home at the age of 17 to join the United States Army, where he became part of the Special Forces Unit, entertaining the troops.

Returning to Brantford in 1947, he began his broadcasting career with radio station CKPC before moving to CFPL-AM in London, Ontario and CKOC and CHML in Hamilton, Ontario, where he also ventured into television at CHCH. He then moved to Ottawa, where he became co-anchor of the CTV World News (later known as CTV National News) with Ab Douglas and Peter Jennings in 1962. He remained with CTV until 1964, when he moved to ABC in the United States and was soon joined at the network by Jennings. Langton joined ABC Radio, first in New York and then in Washington as White House correspondent on radio and television before returning to New York City where he was a news anchor for ABC Radio.

Langton and his family moved back to Canada in 1967 as his sons, Karl and Max, were approaching draft age and the Vietnam War was heating up.

Returning to Canada, he was a newscaster at CHAM-AM in Hamilton and then taught Broadcast Journalism at Mohawk College for ten years, freelanced for the Canadian Broadcasting Corporation, and produced five full-length documentaries for the Global Television Network before retiring in 1980.

His first wife, music teacher Norah Halajian Langton, died in 2009. He was also predeceased by sons, businessman and musician Max in 2013, and Karl, founder of the Brantford Community Symphony Orchestra, in 2017. He was survived by his second wife, Lo-Ann Beckerson, whom he was married to for 42 years, and by his daughter, Jennifer, a music teacher and performer.
