= W5 (TV program) =

Canadian news magazine television series

- Program logo since October 24, 2009
- Genre: News magazine
- Country of origin: Canada
- Original language: English
- No. of seasons: 58

Production
- Running time: 60 minutes
- Production company: CTV News

Original release
- Network: CTV
- Release: September 11, 1966 – March 23, 2024

W5 is a Canadian news magazine television program that was broadcast by CTV from 1966 to 2024.

The title refers to the Five Ws of journalism: Who, What, Where, When and Why? It was the longest-running news magazine/documentary program in North America and the most-watched program of its type in Canada.

In February 2024, Bell Media announced that W5 would conclude as a regular television series after 58 seasons, due to cutbacks at the company; in September 2024, CTV News would relaunch the brand as an investigative journalism unit, producing long-form stories for broadcast on CTV News programs and platforms, and occasional documentary specials for CTV under the branding W5: Avery Haines Investigates.

== History ==
It was launched as W5 on September 11, 1966, just after the demise of CBC Television's This Hour Has Seven Days, at a time when the CTV network was on the brink of bankruptcy. The program's magazine format is considered an inspiration for a number of similar programs, including the American program 60 Minutes which premiered two years later.

The program's first executive producer and host was Peter Reilly. He quit only a few weeks into the first season of W5, in a dispute with John W. H. Bassett, who owned the CTV network's biggest station, CFTO-TV in Toronto. Reilly went on to become the first host of the CBC's later current affairs offering, The Fifth Estate. Peter Rehak was executive producer through the 1980s and 1990s.

Robert Hurst oversaw a revamping of the program look in the fall of 1995. Fiona Conway became executive producer but left for ABC News in 1998. Conway was succeeded by senior producer Ian McLeod and after he left Malcolm Fox became the executive producer from September 2000 until September 2009. Anton Koschany served as executive producer from 2009-2021, during which time the program moved into HD and produced an expanded number of episodes per season. He was succeeded by current Executive Producer Derek Miller.

The program's first regular host was Ken Cavanagh, with reports from CTV National News journalists such as Doug Johnson and Frank Drea, who later became a Progressive Conservative member of Provincial Parliament in Ontario and Trina McQueen, later president of CTV. During the 1970s, Henry Champ was a longtime host, along with Ken Lefolii and Tom Gould. Helen Hutchinson, who also hosted during the 1970s (concurrent with her tenure as co-host of the morning show Canada AM), was one of the first women to gain a prominent position in television news in Canada. Jim Reed joined the programme in 1972 as a field producer and was later appointed as host along with Hutchinson and Champ.

Eric Malling joined W5 in 1990 from CBC's rival news magazine, The Fifth Estate. In 1991, a new team of reporters also joined the program: Susan Ormiston, Christine Nielsen, and Elliott Shiff. The program was called W5 with Eric Malling until Malling moved to hosting the television program Mavericks in 1995.

In 1993–94, an in-depth report on New Zealand showed the results of a nation that had suffered the effects of a debt wall. The report had a significant influence and was used by governments to justify cutting social services. The government of Alberta included transcripts of the program when it sent back rejected grant applications and Ontario Premier Bob Rae cited the program during cabinet debates on the deficit. Author Linda McQuaig criticized the program saying: "It was just full of misinformation," saying that Malling distorted the situation in New Zealand by presenting what was really a short-term currency crisis as something else: national bankruptcy and the loss of credit. The real issue - an overvalued currency - she says, was never brought up. "I'm talking about confusing the issues," she says, "making people believe things that aren't true because that's the point that he wanted to make. You don't need to come out with a technical lie to do that."

In 1996 for its 30th anniversary, the program was rebranded to W-FIVE and became more populist. Hosts included top CTV journalists, including Lloyd Robertson, Craig Oliver and Jim O'Connell.

With broadcast shifting to HD for the 2009–2010 season the program reverted to its traditional title W5 with a revised graphic treatment and a new theme that reflects its investigative nature and culminates in five notes representative of the five Ws of journalism.

Recent hosts have included Robertson, Sandie Rinaldo, Kevin Newman and Lisa LaFlamme (with Robertson continuing to co-host following his 2011 retirement as anchor of the CTV National News until 2016 when he was named special correspondent). W5 has produced such stories as a possible cure for multiple sclerosis ("The Liberation Treatment"), an investigation into fatal shootings by RCMP officers (nominated for a Michener Award), an investigation of abuses at the Nova Scotia Home for Colored Children ("The Throwaway Children"), an annual expose of used car dealer trickery, rampant corruption in Canada's immigration system, and personal stories of burn recovery from the Bali bombing.

Since 2000, the program had officially been designated a "documentary series", with only one or two segments filling an hour-long episode, due to Canadian Radio-television and Telecommunications Commission regulations that count documentaries, but not older-style newsmagazines, as "priority programming". In the 2012–2013 season, the program began experimenting with loosening the format, with occasional three story episodes.

For a period of time in the late 1970s and into the 1980s, the program's introductory theme music used part of "Fool's Overture", a song by the UK band Supertramp. The current theme was composed by Doug Pennock, who has also composed the theme for CTV National News and music for other CTV special projects, including the 2007 two-hour documentary Triumph & Treachery: The Brian Mulroney Story.

On October 24, 2009, CTV unveiled a new look for W5, introduced a new logo and began broadcasting for the very first time in high definition. The title was once again rebranded, back to its original title as W5. This look was further refined with the start of the program's 47th season on September 22, 2012. The start of the 48th season saw the introduction of David Tyler as the current in-show narrator.

=== Transition to CTV News unit ===
In February 2024, as part of cuts by Bell Media, it was announced that W5 would conclude as a regular television series, with its final episode airing in March 2024. Plans were announced for W5 to be relaunched as an investigative journalism unit of CTV News, which will produce long-form and documentary features across its platforms (such as the CTV National News). The new W5 unit launched in September 2024, with W5 host Avery Haines named managing editor and senior correspondent, Jon Woodward as an investigative correspondent, and TSN writer Rick Westhead serving as a senior correspondent. Its first production, Narco Jungle: The Death Train (a five-part report on the Darién Gap), began airing on the CTV National News on September 30, 2024. The unit will also be producing a series of one-hour documentaries for CTV under the title W5: Avery Haines Investigates, with a series premiere on the Darién Gap airing on October 5, 2024.

== Controversies ==
W5 came under controversy during the 1970s when it aired a feature called "Campus Giveaways", hosted by Helen Hutchinson. The feature used incorrect statistics to conclude that foreign students were eroding white Canadians' opportunities for a secondary education and benefitting from public universities that were being funded by Canadian taxpayers, without exploring the statement's backgrounds. The host of the program stated:

... there are so many oriental foreign students that they rarely mix with their Canadian classmates. It's as if there are two campuses at Canadian universities—foreign and domestic. Certainly this Chinese theatre attracts a full house, but not one Canadian student attended.^{1}

It has been alleged that the feature was specifically directed to form a negative view towards Chinese and Chinese Canadians. As well, it did not determine if the people filmed in that particular episode were actually Chinese or Chinese Canadian.

The feature led to widespread protests by Chinese Canadians, including Joseph Yu Kai Wong (later founder of the Yee Hong Centre for Geriatric Care). The feature was also criticized by politicians like Bob Rae and Stephen Lewis, both of whom narrated a rebuttal. With the looming threat of a lawsuit, W5 retracted the feature's statement and apologised. The president of CTV at the time, Murray Chercover, issued the following statement on April 16, 1980:

... our critics—particularly Chinese Canadians and the universities—criticized the program as racist; they were right.... We share the dismay of our critics that this occurred. We sincerely apologize for the fact that Chinese Canadians were depicted as foreigners and for whatever distress this stereotyping may have caused them in the context of our multicultural society.^{2}

This event also led to the formation of the Chinese Canadian National Council in order to form a stronger voice representing Chinese Canadians nationwide.

== Hosts and producers ==
Hosts, reporters, and producers associated with the program have included:

- Heinz Avigdor
- Barry Backus
- Dalton Camp
- Ken Cavanagh
- Henry Champ
- Wei Chen
- Tom Clark
- Fiona Conway
- Kelly Crichton
- Bill Cunningham
- Allya Davidson
- Chad Derrick
- Gordon Donaldson
- Frank Drea
- Malcolm Fox (2000–2009)
- Tom Gould
- Paul Haber
- Avery Haines
- Les Harris
- Robert Hurst
- Helen Hutchinson
- Doug Johnson
- Tom Kennedy
- Peter Kent
- Anton Koschany
- Ken Lefolii
- Michael Maclear (1977–78)
- Victor Malarek
- Eric Malling (1990–1996)
- Jack McGaw
- Dennis McIntosh
- Ian McLeod
- Derek Miller
- Brett Mitchell
- Kevin Newman
- Christine Nielsen
- Susan Ormiston
- Jim Reed
- Peter Rehak (1981–1996)
- Peter Reilly (first host)
- Sandie Rinaldo
- Lloyd Robertson (1934–2026)
- Morley Safer
- Merle Shain
- Elliott Shiff
- Sylvia Sweeney
- Carole Taylor
- Rosemary Vukmanich
- Patrick Watson
- Genevieve Westcott
- Jon Woodward
- Don Young
