= Avis Favaro =

Avis Favaro (born February 1960) is Canada's longest serving on air medical correspondent – now with CTV National News since 1992. She has won numerous awards including a Gemini Award.

Favaro previously worked as medical correspondent for the Global Television Network where she began her career in 1982 as a writer/reporter.

She graduated from the University of Western Ontario (aka Western University) with a degree in history and received her Master's degree in Arts/Journalism, also from UWO.

== Selected awards and nominations ==
- 2019 Registered Nurses Association of Ontario Media Awards "Cannabis-savvy nurses help Canadians explore medical marijuana"
- 2018 McMaster University grants honorary PhD School of Nursing to Avis Favaro
- 2015 Registered Nurses' Association of Ontario Award for Excellence in Health Care Reporting for "Butterfly Child"
- 2013 Registered Nurses Association of Ontario Awards for Excellence in Health Reporting: "A City's Pain"
- 2012 Registered Nurses Association of Ontario Awards for Health Care reporting: "Seniors Poverty Lottery"
- 2012 Radio Television News Director Association of Canada Award (RTNDA) for W5's "Reach for the Top" documentary on double amputee Spencer West's climb up Mount Kilimanjaro
- 2011 Registered Nurses' Association of Ontario Award for Excellence in Health Care Reporting for "Skin Cells to Blood"
- 2009 Canadian Medical Association and Canadian Nurses Association Media Awards for Excellence in Health Reporting for "BPA found in Food Cans"
- 2008 RTNDA for short feature "Carly's Story", CTV National News
- 2007 Winner Canadian Medical Association and Canadian Nurses Association Media Awards for Excellence in Health Reporting: Diabetes and Amputation" and "Lighting the Darkness", CTV National News and W5
- 2000 International Health & Medical Awards – Issues and Ethics Category: "Whistleblower Doctor"
- 1998 Gemini Award - "Young Tissue Extract", CTV National News
- 1989 RTNDA Dan McArthur Award – "Neonatal Crisis", Global Television News
