= Teresa Roncon =

Canadian journalist

Teresa Roncon (born in Angola) is a Canadian former journalist. She was a personality on Discovery Channel Canada, and formerly a CFTO (CTV Toronto) reporter. Prior to both, she was a VJ on MuchMusic.
