= Brendan Connor =

Canadian journalist

Brendan Connor is a Canadian radio and television journalist, currently a reporter with CBC Northern Ontario in Sudbury.

Prior to CBC, he spent 13 years anchoring and reporting for CTV Northern Ontario. His father, Michael Connor, was a longtime TV news anchor for the same station. He left CTV in early 2024 amid staffing cutbacks at parent corporation Bell Media.

Before CTV, he worked as a sports reporter for the English service of Al Jazeera, based out of Washington, DC, and out of Doha, Qatar. For Al Jazeera English, Brendan profiled two-time NBA MVP Steve Nash and also reported on NFL football, NHL hockey, curling, the U-S Open Tennis Championship, the 2007 Cricket World Cup, the 2007 America's Cup yacht racing, the 2007 Pan American Games in Brazil, the 2007 World Anti-Doping Conference in Madrid and the humanitarian sports group Right to Play. In 2008, he did stories on Turkish NBA star, Hedo Türkoğlu, covered the Davis Cup Tennis Finals in Argentina, reported from the Super Bowl in Phoenix, profiled Indycar Racing driver Danica Patrick, South Korean golfers on the LPGA Tour, and produced a series of pre-Olympic stories on athletes and teams headed to Beijing.

Connor attended Queen's University, where he studied English Literature, and became involved with broadcasting at CKLC radio, a local Kingston station. His experience has seen him work for some big organizations, and covering some big events. He had roles broadcasting in sports and news with Canada's CBC Television, CBC Newsworld, CBC Radio CTV, and TSN. He has an extensive and varied career, that includes coverage of eight Olympics for TV, radio and web outlets. He has also written two books, produced a documentary on ski-racing and taught a graduate program in broadcast journalism at Sheridan College, outside Toronto.

The major sports events Connor has covered include: The 2010 Winter Olympic Winter Games in Vancouver and the 2008 Beijing Olympic Summer Games (for the IOC's Olympic News Channel) the 2004 Olympics in Athens (CBC Newsworld), the 2000 Sydney Olympics (CBC.ca), 1988 Olympics in Seoul (CBC Radio), the 1990 New Zealand Commonwealth Games, the Stanley Cup Finals, the World Series, the Super Bowl, the NBA Finals, etc..
