= Craig Oliver (Canadian journalist) =

Canadian journalist

Craig Oliver OC
- Born: November 8, 1938 (age 87); Vancouver, British Columbia, Canada
- Employer: CTV News
- Children: Murray Oliver; Annie Bergeron-Oliver

Craig Oliver OC (born November 8, 1938) is the former chief political commentator for CTV News, and the former co-anchor of the weekly public affairs series Question Period. He retired from full-time employment in 2020.

Oliver was born in Vancouver, British Columbia, and grew up in Prince Rupert, British Columbia. He has been a reporter since 1957.

Oliver was previously CTV's Ottawa bureau chief. Prior to going to Ottawa, he covered the Reagan years as CTV's Washington correspondent for almost a decade. He was a personal friend to the late Pierre Trudeau at the same time that he reported on Trudeau's Liberal government.

Oliver is legally blind, a condition he developed late in life. He has two children, Murray and Annie-Claire. He has one grandchild. Oliver has won two Gemini Awards and the President's Award from the Radio and Television News Directors' Association. He has also won the Gold Ribbon Award from the Canadian Association of Broadcasters, the Charles Lynch Award from the National Press Gallery. The University of Regina honoured Oliver in June 2009, with an honorary Doctor of Laws degree. On June 14, 2013, he received an honorary Doctorate of Letters (honoris causa) from Nipissing University in North Bay, Ontario. In June 2017, Carleton University awarded Oliver an honorary Doctor of Laws degree.

On June 29, 2012, Oliver was named an Officer of the Order of Canada. At the awards ceremony held on November 23, 2012, the Governor General of Canada David Johnston also presented Oliver with the Queen Elizabeth II Diamond Jubilee Medal.
