= Tom Gibney =

Canadian television anchor (1936–2021)

Tom Gibney (November 22, 1936 – April 5, 2021) was a television anchor from 1973 to 2007 in Toronto, Ontario. Gibney was evening news anchor at CFTO-TV in Toronto, and also the former host for the Lotto 6/49 draws (which were syndicated to several stations in Canada) until entering semi-retirement. A native of Saskatchewan, he resided in Courtice, Ontario, until his death.

Gibney had been a fixture behind the desk at CFTO-TV in Toronto for well over two decades. The Yorkton, Saskatchewan, native first arrived in Toronto in 1973. On April 6, 2001, Gibney entered semi-retirement and in November 2007, officially retired from CTV. Gibney was at the helm of CFTO News for 27 years.

Gibney has an uncredited cameo in the 1976 film Network, playing an announcer at the UBS television network – the movie's studio scenes were filmed at CFTO.

Gibney died April 5, 2021, at the age of 84.
