= Roger Smith (journalist) =

Canadian journalist

- Born: May 21, 1951 (age 73); St. Catharines, Ontario, Canada
- Occupation(s): TV reporter, journalist
- Spouse: Denise Chong
- Children: 2

Roger Smith (born May 21, 1951 in St. Catharines, Ontario) is a Canadian journalist. From 1994 until his retirement in 2013, he was a reporter for CTV Ottawa primarily focusing on federal politics. Smith began his career in journalism as a print reporter with The Canadian Press, then joined CTV Ottawa in 1984 and took over the Beijing bureau in 1985. His career has landed him in Europe, Asia as well as Africa. He is married to writer Denise Chong, with whom he has two children.

Smith received a Gemini Award nomination in 1989 for Best Reportage, for "China in Turmoil".
