= CTV National News =

Canadian national TV newscast

- Title screen 2019 to present
- Created by: Baden Langton; Ab Douglas
- Presented by: Weekdays: Sandie Rinaldo (2023–present, early edition); Omar Sachedina (2022–present, late edition); Weekends and Fill-in: Heather Butts (2023–present)
- Country of origin: Canada

Production
- Production locations: 9 Channel Nine Court; Toronto, Ontario
- Running time: 30 minutes
- Production company: CTV News

Original release
- Network: CTV
- Release: September 24, 1962 – present

The CTV National News is the flagship newscast of CTV News, the news division of the CTV Television Network. Produced from CTV's facilities at 9 Channel Nine Court in Scarborough, Toronto, Ontario, the main late-night edition of the newscast is broadcast at 11:00 p.m. local time on CTV, with the live Atlantic Time Zone edition and encores simulcast by the CTV News Channel.

The newscast has been presented by Omar Sachedina since September 5, 2022, who succeeded longtime anchor Lisa LaFlamme. Sandie Rinaldo, the longtime weekend anchor, moved in November 2023 to a new early 5:30 p.m. weekday edition that launched on November 13; she was succeeded as weekend anchor by Heather Butts.

LaFlamme succeeded veteran anchor Lloyd Robertson during the second half of 2011, following Robertson's retirement. Substitute anchors include Butts (for weekday broadcasts), Anne-Marie Mediwake, Todd van der Heyden, Joy Malbon, Vassy Kapelos, Michelle Dubé, Carolyn Jarvis, John Vennavally-Rao, Heather Wright and Merella Fernandez.

The title CTV National News was rarely used in the 1990s and early 2000s; weeknights, the program was branded as CTV News with Lloyd Robertson/Sandie Rinaldo. The title CTV National News was reintroduced as verbal branding in 2008 after the CTV News branding was extended to local newscasts on CTV owned-and-operated (O&O) stations.

CTV National News is not the same as CTV Evening News, a title that appears in some national ratings reports and is sometimes erroneously associated with the 11:00 p.m. newscast. The Evening News is not a single newscast, but an aggregate of viewership of the CTV O&Os' local 6:00 p.m. newscasts for national ratings purposes.

== History ==
The program was launched as the CTV World News on September 24, 1962, as a 15-minute program from the studios of CJOH in Ottawa. Struggling to compete with CBC's more established CBC National News, CTV scheduled its newscast for 10:30 p.m., scheduling a variety show, Network, for 10:45 p.m. The experiment lasted one season. In 1963, the program moved to 11 p.m. This was seen as a direct challenge to the CBC's newscast.

Until 1992, the newscast ran a perennial second in national news ratings to CBC Television's The National. In 1992, its ratings jumped significantly after the CBC's unsuccessful relaunching of its newscast as Prime Time News. CTV National News became the top-rated newscast for the first time in its history.

Until September 1998, the CTV National News aired at midnight in the Maritime provinces. This was because CTV National News only produced one edition for the entire network, which aired live at 11:00 p.m. ET. When CTV Atlantic was purchased by Baton Broadcasting in 1997, one of the improvements was for CTV News to produce a second edition of the national newscast that would air in the Atlantic time zone at 11:00 p.m. CTV National News moved to its new time in September 1998.

In 2023, Bell Media announced that it would add a second, early-evening edition of the CTV National News beginning November 13, 2023, airing at 5:30 p.m. The program competes primarily with Global National, which similarly occupies a supper-hour time slot.

== Anchors ==
The program was originally presented by two anchors: Baden Langton and Ab Douglas. Peter Jennings became a co-anchor in 1963 and remained with the newscast until 1964, when he joined ABC News, where he would become a long-time foreign correspondent and news anchor.

Larry Henderson, the former host of The National was CTV's international affairs analyst and weekend anchor for several years.

Langton joined ABC News in the United States in 1964, first with ABC Radio in New York and then in Washington, DC as White House correspondent for ABC News on both radio and television. Jennings soon followed him, joining ABC television's ABC Evening Report later that year, and becoming anchor in 1965. Harvey Kirck, Jennings' co-anchor since Langton's departure, became the newscast's sole anchor. The program expanded to 20 minutes in 1966, beating out a similar expansion move by the CBC. Kirck and some crewmembers moved from Ottawa to Toronto, though Ab Douglas continued to contribute from Ottawa. The newscast began airing in colour, though colour film of Canadian news events was rare at the time because of the lead time needed to convert it.

In 1976, CTV National News scored a major coup by hiring Lloyd Robertson, anchor of CBC's The National, as co-anchor with Kirck. When Kirck retired in 1984, Robertson became sole weekday anchor of the program, a position he held until 2011. CTV National News remained less than a half-hour until 1988, when it was expanded from 21 minutes to 30 and began satellite delivery to Western Canada.

For a time in the late 1970s and again in the early 1990s, Keith Morrison acted as weekend and substitute anchor and was considered Robertson's likely successor before a network shakeup resulted in his moving to NBC News. Sandie Rinaldo served as weekend anchor from 1985 until her 2023 promotion to host the weeknight early edition, excluding a brief period from 1989 to 1991.

With a total of 40 years on two networks, Robertson was the second-longest tenured news anchor on English-language North American television (network or local), behind Dave Ward, who was the top anchorman at KTRK-TV in Houston, Texas, from 1967 to 2017. He was the longest-tenured network news anchor in North America, outlasting several long-standing anchors in the United States. On October 18, 2006, Robertson celebrated his 30th year as a CTV National News anchor. (Jim Lehrer had presented The NewsHour with Jim Lehrer since its inception in 1975, beating Robertson by almost a year, but he only presented as a sole anchor of the programme from 1995 until 2011.)

On July 8, 2010, Robertson announced that he would retire on September 1, 2011—his 35th anniversary at CTV. The following day, CTV announced Lisa LaFlamme, the network's chief international correspondent and Robertson's backup anchor since 2003, had been named as Robertson's successor. LaFlamme formally took over the program on September 2, 2011. On August 15, 2022, it was announced by Bell Media and CTV that LaFlamme's contract was not being renewed by the network due to a "business decision" to take the newscast "in a different direction". Omar Sachedina assumed the role of chief news anchor and senior editor of CTV National News, as of September 5, 2022.

LaFlamme's departure from the newscast led to allegations that she was fired for having let her hair go grey during the COVID-19 pandemic. In particular, CTV News head Michael Melling faced scrutiny when it was revealed that he had asked in internal memos for an explanation of who had permitted LaFlamme to make that decision, and had sparred with LaFlamme over the costs involved in covering both the Russian invasion of Ukraine and the Platinum Jubilee of Elizabeth II. CTV denied the allegations that LaFlamme's age or hair colour had entered into the decision, and announced a workplace review.

=== Anchors ===
- Baden Langton (1962–1964) (co-anchor)
- Ab Douglas (1962–1964) (co-anchor)
- Peter Jennings (1963–1964) (co-anchor)
- Harvey Kirck (1963–1984, chief anchor from 1964 to 1976, co-anchor 1963 to 1964 and 1976 to 1984)
- Lloyd Robertson (1976–2011, co-anchor from 1976 to 1984, chief anchor from 1984 onward)
- Sandie Rinaldo (1985–1989, 1991–2023, weekends; 2023–present, early evening edition)
- Heather Butts (2023–present, Friday and weekends)
- Keith Morrison (1992–1995) (fill-in)
- Lisa LaFlamme (2011–2022)
- Omar Sachedina (2022–present) (Monday-Thursday)
