= Graham Richardson (journalist) =

Canadian television journalist (born 1970)

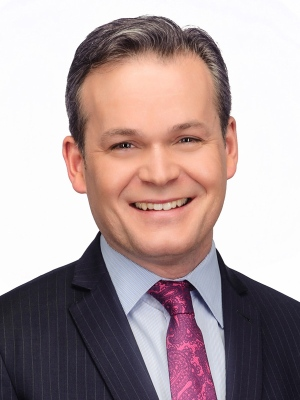
- Born: June 7, 1970 (age 55)
- Education: Queen's University; University of King's College
- Occupation: Television journalist
- Spouse: Leigh Anne
- Children: 2

Graham Richardson is a Canadian television journalist who was the anchor for CTV Ottawa's 6 o'clock newscast on CJOH-DT from 2010 to 2024.

== Background ==
Richardson was born in Connecticut to Canadian parents and raised in Toronto. He earned a Bachelor's Degree from Queen's University in Kingston, Ontario and a post-graduate journalism degree from the University of King's College in Halifax, Nova Scotia.

== Career ==
He worked for the CBC in Calgary, Alberta until 1997. He then joined CITV in Edmonton and stayed until 2001, at which time he joined Global outlet CIII-TV in Toronto as host of Focus Ontario. He then joined CTV as parliamentary correspondent and occasional fill-in host for Mike Duffy Live. When Mike Duffy left CTV, Richardson anchored On the Hill in that time slot for several weeks.

As parliamentary correspondent, he covered the controversy about confidential documents dealing with the Chalk River nuclear reactor having been left at the CTV news bureau. Richardson was himself quoted as saying the documents had "been here in the bureau for six days and we hadn't heard from Natural Resources Minister Lisa Raitt or her office looking for them".

In December 2009, it was announced that in March 2010, he would replace the retiring Max Keeping as news co-anchor at CJOH-TV.

On June 13, 2024, Richardson announced that he'd be stepping down as anchor of the CTV Ottawa 6 PM newscast. His last show was on July 5, 2024.

== Recognition ==
- 1998, finalist, Canadian Association of Journalists award for outstanding investigative journalism in Canada, Election Coverage ITV / WIC
- 2007, finalist, Canadian Association of Journalists award for outstanding investigative journalism in Canada, Prison Suicide CTV
