= Joy Malbon =

Canadian journalist

Joy Malbon is a Canadian journalist with CTV National News, based in Washington, D.C. A veteran of more than 20 years in television, Malbon has covered a variety of major events first hand including the death of Princess Diana, the second Palestinian Intifada, the fall of the Berlin Wall, the Kosovo War, the 1993 World Trade Center bombing, Hurricane Katrina, the Rodney King verdict, Canada's Westray mining disaster, the debate over the Meech Lake Accord and the sex-slaying trial of Paul Bernardo.

As a political correspondent in Ottawa, Malbon covered landmark decisions at the Supreme Court of Canada and followed the rise of Stephen Harper and the Conservative Party of Canada. Over the years she's been Bureau Chief for CTV in London, Halifax and Winnipeg, and has been posted to Toronto and Jerusalem. Malbon is married to Paul Hunter, a correspondent for CBC Television in Washington.
