= Eric Malling =

Canadian journalist (1946–1998)

- Born: September 4, 1946; Swift Current, Saskatchewan, Canada
- Died: September 28, 1998 (aged 52); Toronto, Ontario, Canada
- Occupation: television journalist

Eric Malling (September 4, 1946 – September 28, 1998) was a Canadian television journalist.

Malling was born in Swift Current, Saskatchewan. He was the only son of Danish immigrant John Malling Sorensen, a butcher. He graduated from the University of Saskatchewan with a BA degree in English literature, then continued his studies at Carleton University's School of Journalism in Ottawa.

== Career ==
Eric Malling was a hard-hitting investigative journalist. Malling initially worked for the provincial government. He then worked as a journalist for the Regina Leader-Post, Swift Current Sun, and The Toronto Star beginning in 1968. From 1976 to 1990, he was the host of the CBC's the fifth estate. In 1978, his one-hour documentary on Gerald Bull and his role in the illegal export of artillery shells from Canada to South Africa during apartheid brought wide acclaim. In another of many sensational stories, the Federal Minister responsible for Fisheries, John Fraser, resigned after Malling revealed he had overruled his own health inspectors and allowed the sale of tainted StarKist brand of tuna based on the suggestion by a non-government corporation.

In 1990, he moved to CTV to host W5, which during this period was known as W5 with Eric Malling. In 1995, Malling moved from hosting W5 to hosting Mavericks, a CTV program that explored controversial political figures.

His television journalism earned him a Gemini Award, six ACTRA Awards, three Gordon Sinclair awards for excellence in broadcast journalism. He also received two Centre for Investigative Journalism Awards for excellence in investigative journalism.

== Death ==
Malling died at Sunnybrook Hospital in Toronto. He was 52 years of age.
