= Lisa LaFlamme =

Canadian television journalist (born 1964)

Lisa LaFlamme OC OOnt
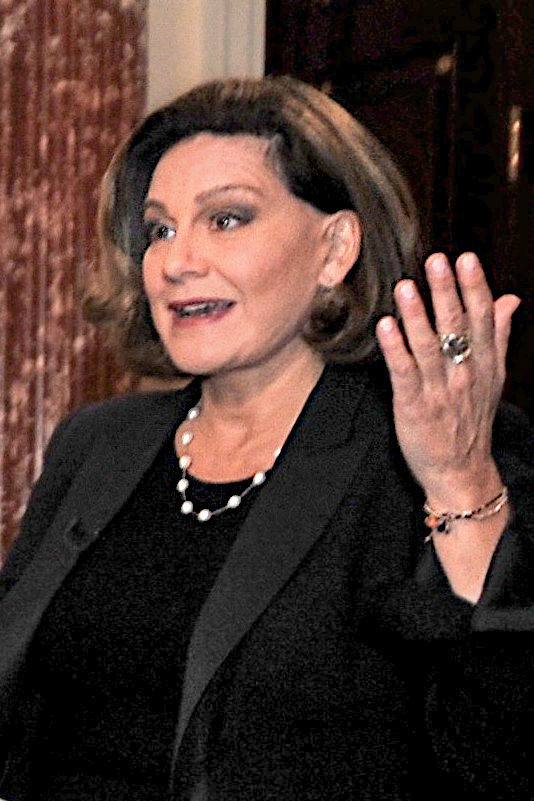
- LaFlamme in 2016
- Born: July 25, 1964 (age 62); Kitchener, Ontario, Canada
- Education: University of Ottawa (BA)
- Occupation: News anchor
- Notable credits: CTV NewsNet (1998–2000); Canada AM (2001–2003); CTV National News correspondent (2003–2010); CTV National News anchor (2011–2022); CityNews special correspondent (2022—2023)
- Partner: Michael Cooke
- Parents: David LaFlamme (father); Kathleen LaFlamme (mother)

Lisa LaFlamme OC OOnt (born July 25, 1964) is a Canadian television journalist, and formerly the chief anchor and senior editor of CTV National News. She replaced Lloyd Robertson in this role on September 5, 2011. LaFlamme previously served as the news international affairs correspondent and substitute host for CTV National News. In August 2022, CTV announced it was ending her contract, due to a "business decision" to take the programme in a "different direction", ultimately replacing her with Omar Sachedina. LaFlamme spoke out publicly regarding her dismissal, and went viral on social media when she claimed she was "blindsided" by the decision.

Following her departure from CTV, Rogers Media announced on September 9, 2022 that it had hired LaFlamme as a special correspondent to cover the death and funeral of Elizabeth II for CityNews. She also covered the Coronation of Charles III and Camilla for CityNews in May 2023.

== Early life ==
LaFlamme was born in Kitchener, Ontario, Canada. She is the third of four daughters born to David, a Franco-Ontarian, and Kathleen a British immigrant. She graduated from St. Mary's High School and then worked in France as an au pair to improve her French. She graduated in 1988 with an honours degree in communications from the University of Ottawa.

== Career ==
LaFlamme began her career at CTV's Kitchener affiliate CKCO in 1989 as a copy writer and script assistant. She moved on to become an anchor in 1997. Past roles include serving as the co-host on Canada AM between 2001 and 2003, as a parliamentary reporter, and on CTV Newsnet (now CTV News Channel).

=== CTV National News ===
LaFlamme joined CTV National News in 2003 as a foreign correspondent as well as back-up anchor to Lloyd Robertson. She covered many international events and conflicts: the September 11, 2001 attacks and the subsequent Iraq War, the War in Afghanistan, the Arab Spring in Cairo in 2011, Hurricane Katrina in 2005, the 2010 Haiti earthquake, the death of Pope John Paul II in 2005 and the election of Pope Francis in 2013. LaFlamme has also covered every Canadian federal election since 1997, and every Olympic Games since 2006, most recently, the Beijing 2008 Summer Olympics and the London 2012 Summer Olympics. Also from London, she covered the Diamond Jubilee of Queen Elizabeth II in 2012, the Platinum Jubilee of Queen Elizabeth II in 2022, and the royal weddings of Prince William and Catherine Middleton in 2011 and of Prince Harry and Meghan Markle in 2018.

Laflamme has interviewed many Canadian figures, such as former Prime Ministers Paul Martin, Jean Chrétien, and Brian Mulroney, Stephen Harper and his wife Laureen Harper, plus former Prime Minister Justin Trudeau and his mother Margaret Trudeau, members of the Canadian royal family, such as Prince Andrew, Sarah, Duchess of York, and Prince Harry, the latter for the Toronto's Invictus Games and during the London Olympics, as well as foreign celebrities like Sir Paul McCartney. She has also interviewed: Boris Johnson (mayor of London at the time), Conrad Black (former businessman), Colin Powell, Bill Clinton, Tony Blair, Benjamin Netanyahu, John Kerry, and Alex Trebek.

After Robertson's departure in September 2011, LaFlamme was promoted to sole anchor in his place. In June 2022, LaFlamme was informed her contract would not be renewed by Bell Media, the parent company of CTV, and that she would be replaced as anchor by Omar Sachedina.

==== Dismissal ====
On August 15, 2022, LaFlamme posted a video on Twitter explaining that her contract had been terminated, saying she was "blindsided" by Bell Media's decision. According to Jesse Brown of Canadaland, LaFlamme was ousted by Michael Melling, a Bell Media Vice President; the two apparently had a disagreement over the budget to cover the Ukrainian-Russian conflict. According to internal sources, while Melling made the decision, it received approval from Karine Moses, senior vice-president of content development and news, Wade Oosterman, president of Bell Media, and Mirko Bibic, president and CEO of BCE Inc. and Bell Canada. Bibic later stated "We are at a crossroads where viewing behaviours have changed dramatically and traditional broadcasting is under severe stress worldwide. In an environment of declining ratings and global online platforms, we can’t keep relying on traditional broadcasting. The days when viewers wait until 11 PM to get their news are gone. While some may resist change, it is necessary and we need to confront this. The CTV national news team needs to work on an integrated and aligned basis, dedicated to a common strategy and Bell Media needs to provide our journalists with the resources they need on all platforms where news is consumed". Among other changes, this realignment would mean that a breaking news story would no longer be covered on CTV National News first, instead it would be published on the CTV News website. In addition LaFlamme was likely a target for those advocating cost-cutting at Bell Canada since she "had a legacy contract that paid way more than the current market rate".

Moses said that LaFlamme was given the opportunity to have a "proper on-air sendoff," but "opted not to say goodbye to the public," and noted that LaFlamme "was offered many options to come back and to do many things, which she declined, and I respect that." LaFlamme's announcement of her departure via Twitter was considered "quick, cold, and calculating" by a Toronto Sun columnist, who also wrote that some former CTV colleagues claimed that LaFlamme and senior producer Rosa Hwang had created a toxic work environment. Note: no citation is listed on the claims made in the last sentence. In addition, LaFlamme's standing among Bell executives likely declined due to incorrect reporting that caused Patrick Brown to resign as Ontario Progressive Conservative (PC) Party leader, as Brown filed a libel lawsuit against CTV that was only recently settled.

The Guardian correspondent Leyland Cecco reported on accusations of misogyny, sexism and ageism and "furore over LaFlamme's termination" in the public debate. Bell Media published a statement that they would be "taking steps to initiate an independent, third-party internal workplace review." Robyn Doolittle of The Globe and Mail alleges a "senior CTV official" told her they witnessed a meeting where "Mr. Melling asked who had approved the decision to 'let Lisa’s hair go grey.' The issue of Ms. LaFlamme’s hair colour came up again on set one day, when he noted that it was taking on a purple hue in the studio lighting." Carol Off and Melissa Fung have argued that LaFlamme's firing was an example of sexism. On August 26, Melling went on leave, effective immediately, to "spend time with his family"; BCE Inc.'s chief executive officer, Mirko Bibic, contradicted CTV's explanation, stating that the leave was "pending the outcome of the workplace review that is proceeding." Journalists within the CTV newsroom issued a letter to Bibic, BCE's board of directors, and president "expressing a lack of confidence in Mr. Melling's leadership", "serious concerns" over LaFlamme's dismissal, and "toxic work culture that has developed at CTV over the past eight months." On December 19, 2022, the independent review concluded with Melling being reassigned away from CTV's news division, citing a need for civility, respect, and better working conditions in the newsroom.

On August 25, the Canadian branch of the Wendy's restaurant chain changed the hair of their girl mascot from red to gray in support of LaFlamme. Dove Canada did not mention LaFlamme explicitly but urged its followers to turn their pictures to grayscale in support of graying women, and announced a $100,000 donation to Catalyst, an organization for inclusive workplaces. The Sports Illustrated Swimsuit Twitter account retweeted the cover of its Maye Musk issue, who also has gray hair, and mentioned its support for the Dove campaign.

=== CityNews ===
On September 9, 2022, Rogers Media announced that it had hired LaFlamme as a special correspondent to cover the death of Queen Elizabeth II and her legacy. She reported from London for CityNews and its platforms.

On April 21, 2023, Rogers Media announced that LaFlamme would cover the coronation of Charles III and Camilla alongside Cynthia Mulligan for CityNews and its platforms.

She did not, however, join CityNews as a full-time permanent correspondent.

=== Other work ===
In 2025 she launched Carry the Fire, a podcast sponsored by the Princess Margaret Cancer Centre in which she interviewed cancer patients and survivors about their experiences and perseverance.

In the summer of 2024, she was selected to headline the Estée Lauder Canada rollout of the "Because of My Age" campaign. She was joined by other prominent female figures including Tamsen Fadal, Gina Torres, and Daisy Fuentes.

=== Timeline ===
- 1988: joined CKCO as copy writer and script assistant
- 1989–1999: Radio News Reporter for CFCA/AM109
- 1991–1997: Reporter and Anchor for CKCO
- 1997–1998: Weekend Anchor/Reporter for CTV NEWS NET
- 1997–1998: Consumer Reporter, CTV News
- 1998–2000: Prime News Anchor for CTV Newsnet (now CTV News Channel)
- 2000–2001: Parliamentary Correspondent, CTV News
- 2001–2003: Co-host of Canada AM
- 2003–2010: National Affairs Correspondent, CTV National News with Lloyd Robertson
- 2010: Appointed successor to Lloyd Robertson as full-time anchor of CTV National News
- 2011–2022: Chief Anchor and Senior Editor CTV National News with Lisa LaFlamme
- 2022, 2023: Special correspondent for CityNews

== Volunteer work ==
A CTV News report in June 2019 detailed the humanitarian work done by LaFlamme:

LaFlamme volunteers with Journalists for Human Rights (JHR) and has travelled with the organization to the Democratic Republic of Congo to mentor and train young journalists. She has championed a program that allows eligible CTV News staff journalists to participate in JHR missions around the world. LaFlamme is also an ambassador of PLAN International, travelling to remote areas to promote child rights, and she volunteers with Canadian Women for Women in Afghanistan, which works to advance education and educational opportunities for Afghan women and their families.

== Personal life ==
LaFlamme is in a long-term relationship with British journalist, Michael Cooke.

== Awards ==
LaFlamme has had five Gemini award nominations in the Best News Anchor category and several RTDNA awards, as well as a 1999 Galaxi Award from the Canadian Cable Television Association.

In March 2014, LaFlamme won a Canadian Screen Award for 'Best National Newscast' and 'Best News Anchor' for CTV National News. In 2016, she was made a Member of the Order of Ontario.

In 2019, LaFlamme was appointed an Officer of the Order of Canada. A news report stated that this honour "recognizes LaFlamme for her contributions to journalism and news broadcasting, as well as her support and promotion of human rights".

She has received honorary doctorates from Toronto Metropolitan University (2023), University of Windsor (2018), University of Ottawa (2014), Wilfrid Laurier University (2006), Mount Saint Vincent University (2026), and Nipissing University (2026).

In 2022, LaFlamme was named as one of the "50 Most Influential Torontonians" in the annual Toronto Life list.

In January 2023, she was named the winner of the Academy of Canadian Cinema and Television's Gordon Sinclair Award for lifetime achievement in journalism at the 11th Canadian Screen Awards.

In February, 2023 she nominated herself for a Best National News Anchor award.
