= Lloyd Robertson =

Canadian journalist and news anchor (1934–2026)

Lloyd Robertson OC
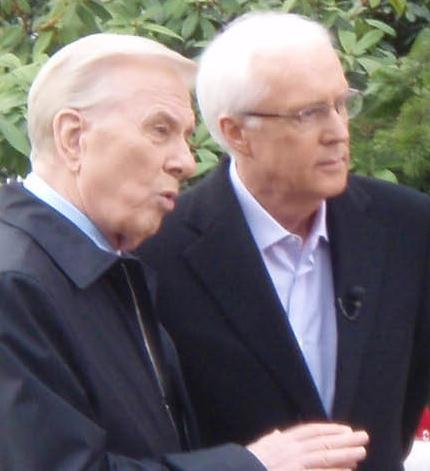
- Robertson (left) and Brian Williams in 2010
- Born: Lloyd John Robertson; January 19, 1934; Stratford, Ontario, Canada
- Died: August 4, 2026 (aged 92); Markham, Ontario, Canada
- Occupation: News anchor
- Years active: 1952–2016
- Notable credit: CTV National News
- Spouse: Nancy Barrett (m. 1956)
- Children: 4 daughters
- Family: 7 grandchildren

Lloyd John Robertson OC (January 19, 1934 – August 4, 2026) was a Canadian journalist and news anchor. He served as the chief anchor and senior editor of CTV's national evening newscast, CTV National News with Lloyd Robertson, from 1984 until 2011, when he retired from the broadcast. Robertson subsequently co-hosted CTV's weekly newsmagazine series W5 from 2011 to 2016.

Robertson covered many major events throughout his career, including the 1967 opening of Expo 67 in Montreal, the 1969 Moon landing alongside Percy Saltzman, numerous Olympic Games, Terry Fox's Marathon of Hope, the patriation of the Constitution of Canada, the 1980 and 1995 Quebec referendum on separation from Canada, numerous federal elections, the death of Diana, Princess of Wales, the September 11 attacks in 2001, and the Northeast blackout of 2003.

As a reporter, he covered the construction of the Berlin Wall, the deaths of four former Canadian prime ministers, the elections of nearly half of Canada's prime ministers, state funerals, and royal, papal, and U.S. presidential visits. His name was also the basis for the satirical news anchor character Floyd Robertson, portrayed by Joe Flaherty on the Canadian television comedy series SCTV.

== Early life ==
Robertson was born on January 19, 1934 in Stratford, Ontario, the son of Lillie and George Robertson. His father had eight children with his first wife; after she died, he remarried and had two sons, Gordon and Lloyd. Lloyd was the youngest child. His father, who was 60 when Robertson was born, worked as a machinist's helper for the Canadian National Railway, while his mother was a homemaker. His father was of Scottish descent, while his mother had emigrated from England.

Robertson later described his childhood as difficult. His mother struggled with severe mental illness, including paranoia, obsessive-compulsive behaviour and anxiety, and underwent a prefrontal lobotomy in 1948. He later said the operation "flat-lined her emotionally" and effectively ended any chance of a close emotional relationship between them.

His father suffered from recurring cancer and died when Robertson was 21. During much of his childhood, Robertson was cared for by his older half-siblings, particularly his twin half-brother and half-sister, Irvin and Ethel.

Robertson credited broadcasting with providing an escape from his troubled home life. At age 12, he watched CJCS radio broadcasters cover the return of soldiers from the Perth Regiment following the Second World War and later recalled realizing he was witnessing "something much bigger than myself." As a teenager, he persuaded the station to hire him for after-school work, spinning 78 rpm records and learning the fundamentals of broadcasting, a job he later said marked the beginning of his lifelong career in journalism.

== Broadcasting career ==
=== Radio ===
Robertson started his broadcasting career in 1952 at CJCS radio. He started working after school on Saturdays as an operator, spinning 78 rpm records, and read the news at midnight before he signed off. Robertson completed high school and continued to work at CJCS until he moved to CJOY in Guelph in 1954.

=== CBC ===
On the advice of one of his colleagues in Guelph, he auditioned to work at the Canadian Broadcasting Corporation (CBC). After his audition was over, Robertson thought, "I'm never going to see this building again." Despite this, he got hired by the CBC, thanks to his bass voice. Robertson applied for CBWT-TV in Winnipeg, Manitoba, in 1956, his first-ever TV job. He mostly did local television until December 25, 1956, which was his first national broadcast. After four years in Winnipeg, Robertson auditioned for CBOT-TV in Ottawa, Ontario. After two years, he moved to Toronto to host CBC Weekend in the late 1960s, and later anchor of The National from 1970 to 1976, before joining the CTV Television Network in October that year.

Robertson said he left the CBC because union rules prevented news anchors from writing scripts, selecting stories, or reporting in the field, responsibilities he wanted to undertake as a journalist.

=== CTV ===
From 1976 to 1984, Robertson co-anchored the CTV National News with Harvey Kirck. When Kirck retired from the anchor desk in 1984, Robertson became the senior news anchor for CTV. Beginning in 2004, Robertson also served as one of the hosts of CTV's current affairs program W5, alternating with CTV's lead weekend anchor Sandie Rinaldo until 2016.

In 2004 he guest starred in a brief cameo on the Saskatchewan filmed sitcom Corner Gas.

In February 2010, Robertson denied rumours of his impending retirement as a "work of fiction" during an appearance on Vancouver talk radio station CKNW. However, during the July 8, 2010, broadcast of CTV National News, Robertson officially announced that he would leave the anchor chair during the latter half of 2011. Although he did not specify a date at the time, his final newscast was later scheduled for September 1, 2011. He stated that he would continue working in various capacities at the network and in public life, including as a host of W5. On September 1, 2011, after 41 years as a national news anchor at both the CBC and CTV, Robertson anchored CTV News for the final time. The newscast concluded with him reminiscing about the stories he had covered, including natural disasters and royal weddings, while describing his career as a rare privilege that had given him "a front row seat to history". He also thanked viewers for watching and supporting him over the years.

Following his retirement as chief anchor, Robertson remained associated with CTV as a special correspondent while continuing other broadcasting projects.

=== Post-CTV ===
In 2017, Robertson became the host of The Walrus with Lloyd Robertson, a weekly program on Accessible Media Inc.'s AMI-audio service produced in partnership with The Walrus magazine. The program featured professionally narrated readings of essays, fiction, poetry, and other selections from the magazine, with Robertson introducing each episode. Robertson continued to host the program until 2020.

Also in 2020, he narrated a portion of the 8th Canadian Screen Awards.

== Personal life and death ==
Robertson married his high school sweetheart, Nancy Barrett, in July 1956. The couple celebrated their 70th wedding anniversary in July 2026. They had four daughters—Lisa, Nancy, Susan, and Lynda—seven grandchildren, and one great-grandson.

On March 29, 2018, Robertson was involved in a multi-vehicle collision on the Don Valley Parkway. He was uninjured.

Robertson died at his home in Markham, Ontario, on August 4, 2026, at the age of 92.

== Philanthropy and community work ==
Robertson was actively involved in charitable causes throughout his broadcasting career. In 1980, following Terry Fox's Marathon of Hope, he hosted a five-hour national CTV telethon that raised $10 million for cancer research. He later served as the honorary chairperson of the Terry Fox Run.

For 11 years, Robertson hosted the annual telethon in support of The Hospital for Sick Children (SickKids) in Toronto. His work with the Terry Fox Run and SickKids was specifically cited when he was appointed an Officer of the Order of Canada.

Following his death in 2026, memorial donations were directed to the Lloyd and Nancy Robertson Youth Initiative Fund at the Stratford and Perth County Community Foundation.

== Broadcasting longevity ==
When Robertson retired from the CTV National News anchor desk in 2011, his combined 41 years anchoring national newscasts for CBC and CTV constituted the longest tenure of any national network news anchor in North America. His tenure included six years anchoring CBC's The National and 35 years anchoring CTV National News. By comparison, Peter Jennings and Tom Brokaw each spent approximately 22 years as national news anchors, while Dan Rather anchored the CBS Evening News for 24 years. Robertson was 77 when he presented his final CTV National News broadcast on September 1, 2011.

== Honours ==
- TV Times Reader's Choice Awards, Canada's Favourite News Anchor – 1998 and 1999
- Officer of the Order of Canada, 1998
- Gemini Award,
  - "Best Host, Anchor, or Interviewer" – 1992, 1994, 1997
  - Gordon Sinclair Award for Broadcast Journalism, 2011
- Scot of the Year Award, The Scottish Studies Society, 1995
- 1994 Winner of the Toronto Star Reader's Voice Award for Favourite TV Anchor
- Honorary chairperson, 1992 Terry Fox Run
- Honorary Doctor of Laws (LL.D) awarded by Royal Roads University – 2006
- Received a star on Canada's Walk of Fame in 2007.
- Honorary (Doctor of Laws) (LL.D) awarded by Brandon University – May 31, 2013
- Received an honorary Doctor of Laws (LL.D) from Carleton University – June 11, 2015
- Inducted into the Canadian Association of Broadcasters Hall of Fame (1998)
- Received the Radio Television Digital News Association of Canada Lifetime Achievement Award
- Received the Canadian Journalism Foundation Lifetime Achievement Award
- Received an honorary Doctor of Divinity degree from Knox College in Toronto, Ontario on May 13, 2026.
