= CTV News =

News division of CTV Television Network

- Division of: CTV Television Network
- Predecessor: A-Channel News/A News (CTV 2 stations)
- Headquarters: Toronto, Ontario, Canada
- Area served: Worldwide
- Key people: Richard Gray (vice president)
- Parent: CTV Inc. (Bell Media)
- Official Website: ctvnews.ca

CTV News is the news division of the CTV Television Network. The name CTV News is also applied as the title of local and regional newscasts on the network's owned-and-operated stations (O&Os), which are closely tied to the national news division. Local newscasts on CTV 2 are also branded as CTV News, although in most cases they are managed separately from the newscasts on the main CTV network.

== History ==
In 1961, CTV News was launched by the Canadian government.

=== Staff milestones ===
On 1 September 2011, chief news anchor and senior news editor Lloyd Robertson retired after 35 years at the helm of the flagship. On 19 September 2023, Bell Media celebrated long-time news anchor Sandie Rinaldo's 50th year with the franchise.

=== Errors and controversies ===
On 26 September 2024, CTV News admitted that it had altered or manipulated a clip of Pierre Poilievre broadcast the previous Sunday. It fired two news editors and apologized "unreservedly". On 2 October, Poilievre ended his boycott of the broadcaster.

== National programs ==
CTV News logo, 2013–2019

CTV's national news division produces the following programs, which air on the main CTV network:

- CTV National News, the nightly newscasts anchored by Sandie Rinaldo (early evening weekdays), Omar Sachedina (late evening weekdays), and Heather Butts (late evening weekends);
- Question Period, a weekly news and interview series.

Additionally, CTV News operates the national 24-hour news channel CTV News Channel and the 24-hour national business news channel BNN Bloomberg, both of which are available across Canada on cable and satellite.

The news division produced the weekday morning news and entertainment program Canada AM from 1972 to October 2015, when responsibility for the program was transferred to Bell Media In-House Productions, the division responsible for CTV's other daytime lifestyle programming, until the program's cancellation in June 2016. Canada AM's replacement Your Morning is produced by Bell Media Studios, with news content provided by CTV News.

On February 8, 2024, Bell announced the cancellation of CTV's long-running newsmagazine W5 as part of budgetary and staff cuts. The brand will still be used for investigative journalism across CTV News properties.

The national news operation also briefly produced a roughly ten-minute national and international news summary, anchored by Heather Butts, which was embedded in CTV O&Os' weekend early evening newscasts from November 2023 to February 2024, when the majority of local weekend newscasts were cancelled.

== Local programs ==
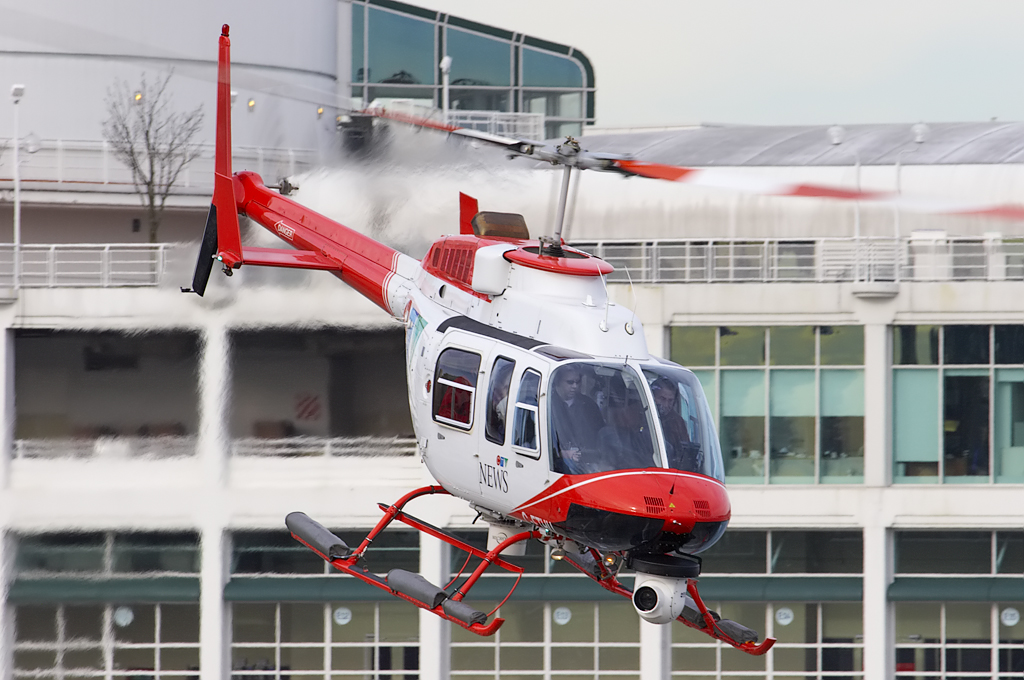
Chopper 9, CTV Vancouver news helicopter in Vancouver operated from August 2004-January 31, 2020. CTV Toronto is the only other station that uses the CTV Chopper. The latter unit is also used on Bell Media's Toronto-based local news channel, CP24, but referred to as Chopper 24.

In most markets, local CTV News programs air at 6 p.m., and 11 p.m. (CTV 2) or 11:30 p.m. (CTV) on weekdays. In selected markets, 5:00 p.m. newscasts, and weekend newscasts at 6 p.m. and 11:00 p.m./11:30 p.m., are also produced, and several CTV stations in western Canada (and some CTV Two stations in eastern Canada) produce local morning newscasts as CTV Morning Live.

In 1998, shortly following the merger of the CTV network with Baton Broadcasting, local news branding on the CTV O&Os was unified with network news presentation, with newscast titles standardized under the format "(call sign) News", for example "CFTO News" for the Toronto station. Prior to this, the local O&Os used various titles, though one used in the late 1970s by a number of stations was "World Beat News" (for late-afternoon broadcasts) and "Night Beat News" (for late-night broadcasts). By late 2005, the O&Os' local newscasts had been renamed "CTV News". Beginning in February 2014, local programs were rebranded using region-specific on-air titles such as "CTV News Toronto".

On November 13, 2023, CTV replaced 5:30 p.m. newscasts with an evening edition of CTV National News.

On February 8, 2024, Bell made major cuts to CTV's local newscasts. All noon newscasts outside of Toronto were cut, as well as weekend newscasts outside of Montreal, Toronto, and Ottawa. Bell also expanded multimedia journalist models to Atlantic Canada, Alberta, Manitoba, Quebec and Saskatchewan.

National aggregate ratings published by BBM Canada refer to the local broadcasts collectively as CTV Evening News, CTV Late News, CTV Noon News, etc., although these titles are not used on-air. Since most CTV affiliates are owned by the network, CTV offers the opportunity to buy national ads on local programming across its O&Os, making these aggregate ratings useful for advertisers.

Local CTV News programs are produced in the following markets:

- Barrie (CKVR)
- Calgary (CFCN)
- Edmonton (CFRN)
- Greater Sudbury (CICI / CTV Northern Ontario)
- Halifax (CJCH / CTV 2 Atlantic)
- Kitchener (CKCO)
- London (CFPL)
- Montreal (CFCF)
- Ottawa (CJOH / CHRO)
- Regina (CKCK)
- Saskatoon (CFQC)
- Toronto (CFTO)
- Vancouver (CIVT)
- Victoria (CIVI)
- Winnipeg (CKY)
- Windsor (CHWI)

CTV O&Os in smaller markets air a newscast produced in one of the larger markets noted above, although some may also produce a shorter local news insert aired during a break in the main market's program, and some of these smaller stations produce their own noon newscasts.

Through the purchase of CHUM Limited, Bell Media acquired A News which produced local newscasts mainly in smaller markets or alternate areas of larger markets. When the A system was rebranded as "CTV Two" on August 29, 2011 (and later CTV 2), its newscasts switched to the CTV News branding, likely because "CTV Two News" might be seen as connoting a second-class newscast. The CTV News broadcasts on the CTV 2 stations previously used the main CTV logo as their logo bug during these newscasts as did the main CTV network, but they currently use the regionally branded titles such as CTV News Barrie as is now the case for the CTV O&Os. Most of these stations are nevertheless required to separate their news operations from CTV stations in local and adjacent markets. This restriction does not apply to the cable-only channels CTV Two Atlantic, which has been co-owned with the local CTV stations since its launch (their news operations have been fully integrated since 1998), and CTV Two Alberta, which produces a current affairs program, Alberta Primetime, using resources from local CTV stations.

Independent affiliates also air their own local newscasts, such as NTV (which despite dropping CTV's entertainment programming in 2002, still provides coverage of Newfoundland for CTV News and airs its national newscasts), and CITL-TV (which airs Prime Time Local News, a production shared with its sister station, Global affiliate (now Citytv affiliate) CKSA-TV).

Bell Media also operates CP24, a regional news channel focusing on the Greater Toronto Area and most of Southern Ontario, which was acquired through the purchase of CHUM Limited, and formerly aligned with Citytv Toronto. The channel airs news programs focused on the region, and as of June 2024, the station airs simulcasts of CFTO's 12 noon (weekdays); 6 p.m. and 11:30 p.m. newscasts.

== News bureaus ==
CTV News has bureaus across Canada and around the world, but many were closed to cut costs (most recently those in London, Los Angeles, Moscow, and Kampala) and replaced with reporters sent to locations from the existing bureaus.

A list of current bureaus:

=== National ===
- Halifax
  - Reporter: Paul Hollingsworth
- Fredericton
  - Reporter: Sarah Plowman
- Montreal
  - Bureau Chief: Geneviève Beauchemin
- Ottawa
  - Bureau Chief: Graham Richardson
  - Chief Political Correspondent: Vassy Kapelos
  - Reporters: Annie Bergeron-Oliver, Judy Trinh, Jeremie Charron, Colton Praill, and Mike Le Couteur
- Regina
  - Reporter: Allison Bamford
- St. John's
  - Reporter: Garrett Barry
- Toronto
  - Reporters: John Vennavally-Rao, Heather Wright, Heather Butts, Adrian Ghobrial, Scott Hurst, Tony Grace, Kamil Karamali, and Cristina Tenaglia
- Winnipeg
  - Reporter: Alex Karpa
- Calgary
  - Reporter: Kathy Le
- Vancouver
  - Bureau Chief: Andrew Johnson

=== International ===
- Washington - United States
  - Bureau Chief: Joy Malbon

== My News ==
In 2008, the CTV News website introduced My News, a citizen journalism feature allowing citizens to upload their images or videos relating to current events. Viewers may also upload media for any station or program.

== NewsDay and NewsNight by CTV News ==
NewsDay and NewsNight aired weekly on Quibi exclusively in Canada. It was hosted by Heather Butts and Reshmi Nair. Quibi was shut down on December 1, 2020.

== Criticism and controversy ==
=== Allegations of anti-Palestinian bias ===
In November 2023, reports emerged alleging that CTV News exhibited systemic bias against Palestinians in its coverage of the Israeli–Palestinian conflict. According to an investigation by The Breach, internal emails revealed that CTV journalists were instructed not to use the term "Palestine," with a senior editor reportedly stating that "Palestine...does not currently exist." The investigation also claimed that CTV National News, the network's flagship program, featured 62% more Israeli voices than Palestinian voices in its coverage following the October 7, 2023, Hamas attack on Israel. Additionally, it was reported that nearly half of the Palestinian voices featured were not identified by name, unlike their Israeli counterparts.

Journalists interviewed by The Breach alleged a "culture of fear" within CTV newsrooms, where staff felt discouraged from reporting critically on Israel's actions due to potential repercussions. These allegations sparked public debate about mass media impartiality in Canada with some commentators and activists arguing that CTV's coverage contributed to an unbalanced portrayal of the conflict. CTV News did not publicly respond to these specific claims.
