= List of news presenters =

This is a list of news presenters by nationality.

== List of news presenters by nationality ==
=== American news anchors ===
- Roz Abrams, formerly of CBS News, ABC's Eyewitness News
- Christiane Amanpour, CNN
- Ernie Anastos (retired), formerly of WNYW, WABC-TV and WCBS-TV
- Sade Baderinwa, WABC-TV
- Bret Baier, Fox News
- Rudi Bakhtiar, formerly at CNN and last seen at Fox News as a correspondent
- Errol Barnett, CBS News, formerly CNN and CNN Newsroom
- Dana Bash, CNN
- Martin Bashir, MSNBC, formerly ABC's Nightline
- Pat Battle (anchorwoman), WNBC Weekend Today in New York
- Bill Beutel (deceased), WABC-TV formerly ABC News
- Wolf Blitzer, CNN
- David Bloom (deceased), NBC News and co-anchor of the Today
- Bill Bonds, formerly of WXYZ-TV, WABC-TV and KABC-TV
- Sandra Bookman, WABC-TV
- Ed Bradley (deceased), CBS News
- Kate Bolduan, CNN
- David Brinkley (deceased) The Huntley–Brinkley Report NBC
- Tom Brokaw (retired), formerly NBC News
- Pamela Brown, CNN
- Campbell Brown, formerly NBC News
- Dara Brown, MSNBC
- Aaron Brown, formerly at CNN and ABC News
- Cheryl Burton, WLS-TV
- Neil Cavuto, Fox News
- John Chancellor (deceased), NBC Nightly News
- John Charles Daly (deceased), ABC News
- Liz Cho, WABC-TV, formerly ABC News
- Connie Chung, formerly of CBS News, NBC News, CNN, and MSNBC
- Kaitlan Collins, CNN
- Casey Coleman (deceased), WJW-TV
- Amanda Congdon, Rocketboom
- Anderson Cooper, CNN
- Katie Couric, formerly at NBC News, CBS News, ABC News and Yahoo! News
- David Crabtree, WRAL-TV
- Walter Cronkite (deceased), CBS News
- Chris Cuomo, formerly of ABC News and CNN
- Ann Curry, formerly of NBC News Today
- Chet Curtis, NECN
- Faith Daniels, formerly of CBS News and NBC News
- José Díaz-Balart, NBC News
- Lou Dobbs, Fox Business, formerly CNN
- Hena Doba, Cheddar (TV channel), formerly of CBS News
- Sam Donaldson, ABC News
- Hugh Downs (deceased), ABC News 20/20, formerly at NBC News
- Maurice DuBois, WCBS-TV
- Jerry Dunphy (deceased), KCBS-TV, KCAL-TV, KABC-TV
- Douglas Edwards (deceased), CBS News, 1950s
- Steve Edwards, KHOU-TV WLS-TV KCBS-TV KABC-TV KCAL-TV and KTTV
- Josh Elliott, CBS News, NBC Sports, ABC's Good Morning America, co-anchor of ESPNEWS
- Harris Faulkner, Fox News
- Greg Fishel, WRAL-TV
- Hal Fishman (deceased), KTLA-TV
- Charlie Gaddy (retired), WRAL-TV
- Rick Gall, WRAL-TV
- Jim Gardner, WPVI-TV
- Dave Garroway (deceased), Today NBC
- Willie Geist, MSNBC and co-anchor of the Sunday Today NBC
- John Gibson, Fox News
- Charles Gibson, ABC News
- Hala Gorani, formerly CNN, now NBC News
- Nancy Grace, CNN
- Enrique Gratas (deceased), Estrella TV, formerly Univisión
- David Gregory, NBC News
- Roger Grimsby (deceased) formerly of WABC-TV, KGO-TV and WNBC
- Bryant Gumbel, former anchor of NBC's Today and CBS' The Early Show
- Savannah Guthrie, current co-anchor of NBC's Today
- Tamron Hall, formerly of NBC's Today, NBC News and MSNBC
- John Hambrick, formerly WEWS-TV, KRON-TV, KABC-TV, WNBC, WTVJ and WCIX
- Judd Hambrick
- Mike Hambrick
- Poppy Harlow, CNN
- Leon Harris, WJLA-TV
- Jim Hartz (deceased), formerly NBC News
- Paul Harvey (deceased), News & Comment, ABC radio
- Erica Hill, formerly NBC News now CNN
- Lester Holt, Dateline NBC, former anchor of NBC Nightly News
- Calvin Hughes, WPLG Local 10
- Brit Hume, Fox News, formerly ABC News
- Chet Huntley (deceased), The Huntley–Brinkley Report (NBC)
- Jackie Hyland, WRAL-TV
- Steve Inskeep, Morning Edition, NPR
- Natalie Jacobson (retired), WCVB-TV
- Chris Jansing, MSNBC
- Peter Jennings (deceased), ABC News
- Jim Jensen (deceased), WCBS-TV
- Mike Jerrick Good Day Philadelphia anchor on WTXF-TV
- Larry Kane (retired), WPVI-TV, WCAU and KYW-TV
- Megyn Kelly, Fox News and NBC News
- Gayle King, CBS This Morning
- Hoda Kotb, former co-anchor of NBC's Today
- Ted Koppel, ABC News
- Bill Kurtis, former WBBM-TV anchor, now at CBS News
- Nicole Lapin, CNN, CNN Pipeline, HLN
- Matt Lauer, formerly of NBC News Today
- Jim Lehrer (deceased), The NewsHour with Jim Lehrer (PBS)
- Don Lemon, formerly CNN
- Dan Lewis, KOMO-TV News
- Art Linkletter (deceased), KGB-AM radio, San Diego (1930s)
- Tom Llamas, current anchor of NBC Nightly News, formerly of WNBC-TV and ABC News
- Nancy Loo, WFLD, former WABC-TV
- Robert MacNeil (deceased), The MacNeil/Lehrer NewsHour (PBS)
- Rachel Maddow, MSNBC
- Paul Magers, (retired) former KSTP-TV KATU-TV KGTV-TV KARE-TV KCBS-TV
- Ron Magers (retired), former WMAQ-TV WLS-TV
- Carol Marin, WMAQ-TV, formerly WBBM-TV
- Chris Matthews, MSNBC
- Kathleen Matthews, WJLA-TV
- Frank McGee (deceased), NBC News
- Craig Melvin, current co-anchor of NBC's Today
- Bill Milldyke (deceased), WOI-TV, ABC News
- Andrea Mitchell, NBC News and MSNBC
- Natalie Morales, formerly Today, currently host The Talk (CBS)
- Piers Morgan, CNN
- Paul Moyer, KNBC, formerly KABC-TV
- Bill Moyers, Moyers and Company
- Roger Mudd (deceased), CBS News, NBC News, History
- David Muir, ABC World News Tonight
- Edward R. Murrow (deceased)
- Edwin Newman (deceased), NBC News
- Kent Ninomiya (retired), formerly of KSTP-TV, KCOP/KTTV, KGO-TV, WLS-TV, KIEM
- Deborah Norville, formerly of CBS News and NBC News
- Norah O'Donnell, CBS Evening News
- Miles O'Brien, CNN
- Bill O'Reilly, formerly of Fox News
- Keith Olbermann, MSNBC
- Jane Pauley, formerly NBC News, now CBS News
- Scott Pelley, CBS Evening News
- Gordon Peterson, WJLA-TV, formerly at WUSA (TV)
- Kyra Phillips, CNN
- Stone Phillips, Dateline NBC
- Rebecca Quick, CNBC Squawk Box
- Jorge Ramos, Univision
- Dan Rather (retired), CBS News
- Bill Ratner, WRAL-TV
- Harry Reasoner (deceased), CBS News and ABC News
- Ralph Renick (deceased), WTVJ
- Frank Reynolds (deceased), ABC News
- Dennis Richmond (retired), KTVU
- Bill Ritter, WABC-TV
- Geraldo Rivera, Fox News
- Amy Robach, formerly NBC News now ABC News
- Robin Roberts, ABC News,
- John Roberts, Fox News, formerly CBS News, CNN
- Max Robinson (deceased), ABC News
- Michele Ruiz, KNBC, KTLA, Channel One News
- Tim Russert (deceased), NBC News
- Morley Safer (deceased), 60 Minutes CBS
- Maria Elena Salinas, Univision
- Andrea Sanke, TRT World
- Al Sanders (deceased), WJZ-TV
- Jessica Savitch (deceased), NBC News and Frontline
- Diane Sawyer, ABC News
- Forrest Sawyer
- Rose Ann Scamardella (anchor), Eyewitness News
- Chuck Scarborough, WNBC
- Bob Schieffer, CBS News
- Bill Sharpe, WCSC-TV
- Bella Shaw, CNN (Showbiz Today)
- Bernard Shaw (retired), CNN
- Kent Shocknek, KCBS-TV
- Maria Shriver (on leave of absence), CBS News and NBC News
- Sue Simmons, WNBC
- Harry Smith, NBC News formerly at CBS News
- Howard K. Smith (deceased), ABC News, formerly at CBS News
- Shepard Smith, Fox News
- Alison Starling, WJLA-TV
- George Stephanopoulos, ABC News
- Lori Stokes, WABC-TV
- John Stossel, formerly of Fox News, Fox Business, ABC News' 20/20 (May 2003)
- Tom Suiter, WRAL-TV
- Kathleen Sullivan, formerly of CNN, ABC News, CBS News, NBC News
- Jake Tapper, CNN
- Mark Thompson
- Marie Torre (deceased), anchorwoman for KDKA-TV
- Jerry Turner (deceased), WJZ-TV
- Tina Tyus-Shaw, WSAV-TV
- Garrick Utley (deceased), CNN, formerly NBC News and later ABC News
- Jennifer Valoppi, formerly WTVJ
- Greta Van Susteren, Fox News
- Jim Vance (deceased), WRC-TV
- Elizabeth Vargas, ABC News, 20/20 and ABC World News Tonight
- Cecilia Vega, formerly ABC News, World News Tonight Saturday
- Meredith Vieira, NBC News
- Liz Wahl, formerly RT
- Bree Walker, formerly of KGTV, KCBS-TV and WCBS-TV
- Chris Wallace, formerly Fox News and NBC News currently CNN
- Mike Wallace (deceased), 60 Minutes CBS
- Barbara Walters (deceased), formerly NBC News and ABC News
- Dave Ward (deceased), KTRK-TV
- Bob Weaver (deceased), WTVJ
- Tim White, WTTG
- Cindy Williams, WCSH
- Jack Williams, WBZ-TV
- Pete Williams
- Brian Williams, formerly NBC Nightly News
- Diana Williams, WABC-TV, formerly WNEV-TV (now WHDH-TV)
- Mary Alice Williams, NBC News
- Walter Winchell (deceased), The Jergens Journal, NBC radio (1930s)
- Jenna Wolfe, formerly NBC News
- Bob Woodruff (on extended absence), ABC News
- Judy Woodruff, PBS NewsHour formerly CNN
- Chris Wragge, WCBS-TV
- Gideon Yago
- Toni Yates
- Bob Young
- Linda Yu, former WMAQ-TV anchor, now at WLS-TV
- Paula Zahn, formerly of ABC News, CBS News, Fox News and CNN
- Arnold Zenker
- Marvin Zindler (deceased), KTRK-TV

=== Australian newsreaders ===
- Tony Jones, ABC
- Sandra Sully, Network Ten
- Natarsha Belling, seven Network
- Bill Woods, Network Ten
- Kathryn Robinson, ABC Radio Sydney
- Natalie Barr, Seven Network
- Anton Enus, SBS
- Ann Sanders, Seven Network
- Samantha Armytage, Nine Network
- Rebecca Maddern, Seven Network
- Georgie Gardner, Nine Network
- Michael Usher, Seven Network
- Juanita Phillips, ABC
- Janice Petersen, SBS
- Mark Ferguson, Seven Network
- Brian Henderson (retired), Nine Network
- Jim Waley (retired), Nine Network
- James Dibble (deceased), ABC
- Ron Wilson, Network Ten
- Deborah Knight, Nine Network
- Ian Ross, Seven Network
- Michael Holmes, CNN, CNN International
- Chris Bath, Network 10
- Sir Eric Pearce (deceased), Seven Network, Nine Network
- Brian Naylor (deceased), Nine Network
- Peter Hitchener, Nine Network
- Ian Henderson, ABC
- Kathy Bowlen, ABC
- Mal Walden, Network Ten
- Helen Kapalos, Network Ten
- Jennifer Keyte, Network ten
- Peter Mitchell, Seven Network
- David Johnston (retired), Seven Network/Network Ten
- Bruce Paige, Nine Network
- Heather Foord, Nine Network
- Bill McDonald, Network Ten
- Marie-Louise Theile (retired), Network Ten
- Rod Young, Seven Network
- Kay McGrath, Seven Network
- Sharyn Ghidella, Network ten
- Kevin Crease (deceased), Nine Network
- Rob Kelvin, Nine Network
- Michael Smyth, Nine Network
- Rebecca Morse, Network Ten
- George Donikian, Network Ten
- Jane Doyle, Seven Network
- Dixie Marshall, Nine Network
- Sonia Vinci, Nine Network
- Tim Webster, Network Ten
- Charmaine Dragun (deceased), Network Ten
- Rick Ardon, Seven Network
- Susannah Carr, Seven Network

=== Austrian news readers ===
- Hans Georg Heinke, ORF

=== Bangladeshi newsreaders ===
- Atiqul Haque Chowdhury, Bangladesh Television
- Iqbal Bahar Chowdhury, Voice of America
- Nurul Islam, BBC World Service

=== Brazilian newsreaders ===
- Ana Paula Araújo, Rede Globo
- Boris Casoy, RedeTV!
- Carlos Nascimento, SBT
- Chico Pinheiro, Rede Globo
- Evaristo Costa, former CNN Brazil, former Rede Globo
- Heraldo Pereira, Rede Globo
- Leilane Neubarth, GloboNews
- Maria Júlia Coutinho, Rede Globo
- Monalisa Perrone, former CNN Brazil, former Rede Globo
- Natuza Nery, GloboNews
- Rachel Sheherazade, SBT
- Renata Vasconcellos, Rede Globo
- Sandra Annenberg, Rede Globo
- William Bonner, Rede Globo
- William Waack, CNN Brazil

=== British newsreaders and newscasters ===
- George Alagiah (deceased), BBC Six O'Clock News
- Michael Aspel, BBC Nine O'Clock News in the 1960s
- Mark Austin, ITN ITV News at Ten, Sky News US Correspondent
- Zeinab Badawi, BBC World News Today
- Richard Baker (deceased), BBC Nine O'Clock News co-presenter in the 1960s and 1970s
- Errol Barnett, CBS News, formerly CNN and CNN Newsroom
- Reginald Bosanquet (deceased), ITN longtime presenter of News at Ten
- Tom Bradby, ITN ITV News at Ten
- Fiona Bruce, BBC News at Ten, BBC News at Six and "Question Time TV Programme".
- Michael Buerk, BBC, Today Programme and previously BBC Nine O'Clock News
- Kay Burley, Sky News Kay Burley
- Sir Alastair Burnet (deceased), ITN longtime presenter of News at Ten
- Andrea Byrne, ITN ITV Weekend News
- Jill Dando (deceased), ex-BBC presenter
- Sir Robin Day (deceased), ITN presenter in the 1950s and 1960s
- Alan Dedicoat, BBC Radio 2 newsreader (also National Lottery's "Voice of the Balls")
- Katie Derham, previously ITN ITV News at 1:30
- Daljit Dhaliwal, ITN ITN World News, Worldfocus and Foreign Exchange
- Peter Donaldson (deceased), BBC Radio 4
- Huw Edwards, BBC News at Ten
- Julie Etchingham, ITN ITV News at Ten
- Anna Ford, ITN News at Ten, retired from BBC in 2006, where she presented the BBC One O'Clock News
- Max Foster, formerly BBC News, now with CNN International
- Matt Frei, Channel 4 News
- Sandy Gall, ITN 1963 to 1992, part of the original team of News at Ten in 1967
- Andrew Gardner (deceased), one of the original team of News at Ten when it started in 1967
- Krishnan Guru-Murthy, Channel 4 News
- Mishal Husain, British news presenter for BBC Television and BBC Radio. Host on Today, BBC World News and BBC Weekend News.
- Darren Jordon, Al-Jazeera (from November 2006)
- Natasha Kaplinsky, Previous BBC Six O'Clock News and Five News, now ITV News relief
- Kenneth Kendall (deceased), BBC Nine O'Clock News co-presenter in the 1960s and 1970s
- Tasmin Lucia Khan, ITV Daybreak; ex-BBC News presenter
- Richard Lindley (deceased), ITN ITN World News
- Fatima Manji, Channel 4 News
- Sheena McDonald, Channel 4 News presenter in the 1990s
- Sir Trevor McDonald, ITN News at Ten
- Sarah-Jane Mee, Sky News The Sarah-Jane Mee Show
- Cliff Michelmore (deceased), presenter, Tonight
- Dermot Murnaghan, Sky News Sky News Tonight
- Cathy Newman, Channel 4 News
- Mary Nightingale, ITN ITV News at 6:30
- Leonard Parkin (deceased), ITN newsreader in the 1970s and 1980s
- Jeremy Paxman, BBC, now presenter of Newsnight
- Sophie Raworth, BBC One O'Clock News and Sunday Morning (formerly The Andrew Marr Show).
- Angela Rippon, BBC, then the (now defunct) ITV News Channel
- Tom Sandars Radio 2 Newsreader
- Selina Scott, ITN ITN World News
- Peter Sissons (deceased), Channel 4 News, later BBC Nine O'Clock News
- Jon Snow, Channel 4 News
- Julia Somerville, ex-ITV News, now BBC News relief
- Alastair Stewart, ITN ITV News at 1:30, ITV News at 6:30
- Moira Stuart, Previously of BBC Nine O'Clock News and BBC Breakfast
- Justin Webb, ex-BBC Six O'Clock News and BBC One O'Clock News
- Richard Whitmore (retired), BBC
- Peter Woods (deceased), former newsreader on BBC1 and BBC2
- Kirsty Young, ex-Five News

=== Canadian news anchors ===
- Thalia Assuras
- Pierre Bruneau
- Earl Cameron (deceased), The National News (CBC)
- Bernard Derome, Le Téléjournal (SRC)
- Dawna Friesen, Global National (Global)
- Barbara Frum (deceased), The Journal (CBC)
- Céline Galipeau, Le Téléjournal (SRC)
- Lorne Greene, National News Headlines (CBC)
- Ian Hanomansing, Canada Now (CBC)
- Peter Kent, The National (CBC) and First National (Global)
- Harvey Kirck (deceased), CTV National News (CTV)
- Lisa LaFlamme, CTV National News (CTV)
- Peter Mansbridge, The National (CBC)
- Keith Morrison, The Journal (CBC)
- Knowlton Nash (deceased), The National (CBC)
- Tara Nelson, Global National (Global)
- Kevin Newman, Global National (Global)
- Tony Parsons, Canada Tonight
- Sandie Rinaldo, CTV National News (CTV)
- Lloyd Robertson, CTV National News (CTV)
- Mutsumi Takahashi, CTV News Montreal (CTV)
- Sophie Thibault, Le TVA 22 heures, first North American solo national news anchorwoman (in 2002)
- Pamela Wallin, Canada AM (CTV) and Prime Time News (CBC)

=== Chinese news anchors ===
The following are announcers on CCTV's Xinwen Lianbo, the official national news programme in mainland China:

- Luo Jing

=== Colombian newsreaders ===
- Silvia Corzo, Caracol TV
- Mónica Jaramillo, Caracol TV
- María Lucía Fernández, Caracol TV
- Mábel Lara, Caracol TV
- Vanessa de la Torre, Caracol TV
- Ángela Patricia Janiot, CNN en Español
- Claudia Palacios, CNN en Español

=== Dutch newsreaders ===
- Laila Abid, formerly NOS Journaal
- Winfried Baijens, NOS Journaal
- Noraly Beyer, formerly NOS Journaal
- Sacha de Boer, formerly NOS Journaal
- Amber Brantsen, formerly NOS Journaal
- Pia Dijkstra, formerly NOS Journaal
- Philip Freriks, formerly NOS Journaal
- Eva Jinek, formerly NOS Journaal
- Astrid Kersseboom, formerly NOS Journaal
- Anita Sara Nederlof, RTL Nieuws
- Jeroen Overbeek, NOS Journaal
- Jeroen Pauw, formerly RTL Nieuws
- Antoin Peeters, RTL Nieuws
- Marga van Praag, formerly NOS Journaal
- Loretta Schrijver, formerly RTL Nieuws
- Harmen Siezen (deceased), formerly NOS Journaal
- Dionne Stax, formerly NOS Journaal
- Annechien Steenhuizen, NOS Journaal
- Rob Trip, NOS Journaal
- Simone Weimans, NOS Journaal
- Merel Westrik, formerly RTL Nieuws
- Herman van der Zandt, formerly NOS Journaal
- Joop van Zijl, formerly NOS Journaal

=== Finnish newsreaders ===
- Arvi Lind, YLE

=== Egyptian newsreaders ===
- Ahmed Mansour (journalist)
- Yousef Gamal El Din, CNBC Europe

=== French newsreaders ===
- Patrick Poivre d'Arvor (retired), TF1
- Arlette Chabot, France 2
- Claire Chazal (retired), TF1
- David Pujadas, France 2
- Béatrice Schönberg, France 2
- Jean-Pierre Pernaut, TF1
- Melissa Theuriau, La Chaîne Info, then M6
- Christine Ockrent, France 2 and France 3
- Marie Drucker, France 2
- Audrey Pulvar, France 3
- Léon Zitrone, TF1
- Elise Lucet, France 2
- Laurent Delahousse, France 2

=== German newsreaders ===
- Dagmar Berghoff, ARD Tagesschau
- Petra Gerster, ZDF Heute
- Jan Hofer, ARD Tagesschau
- Lothar Keller, RTL aktuell
- Claus Kleber, ZDF Heute Journal
- Peter Kloeppel, RTL aktuell
- Judith Rakers, ARD Tagesschau
- Jens Riewa, ARD Tagesschau
- Steffen Seibert, ZDF Heute and ZDF Heute Journal
- Marietta Slomka, ZDF Heute Journal
- Thomas Roth, ARD Tagesthemen
- Wilhelm Wieben, ARD Tagesschau

=== Greek newsreaders ===
- Maria Houkli, NET, ERT
- Nikos Hadjinikolaou, Alpha TV
- Elli Stai, ANT1
- Eva Kaili, weekends, Mega Channel

=== Hong Kong news anchors ===
- Lavender Cheung, Cable News Hong Kong
- Cheung Wai Tsz, ATV News

=== Indian newsreaders ===
- Arnab Goswami, Republic TV
- Vineet Malhotra, News World India
- Vikram Chandra, NDTV
- Naveen Soni, Zee Business
- Rajat Sharma, India TV
- Sudhir Chaudhary, Zee News
- Anjana Om Kashyap, Aaj Tak

=== Indonesian newsreaders ===
- Aiman Witjaksono, iNews
- Camar Haenda, iNews
- David Silahooij, iNews
- Rosaline Hioe, iNews
- Yasmin Athania, iNews
- Anisha Dasuki, iNews
- Riko Anggara, SCTV
- Djati Dharma, SCTV
- Azizah Harum, SCTV
- Risca Andalina, SCTV
- Jeremy Teti, SCTV
- Zilvia Iskandar, Metro TV
- Meutya Hafid, Metro TV
- Putra Nababan, Metro TV

=== Irish newscasters ===
- Bryan Dobson, RTÉ
- Anne Doyle, RTÉ
- Sharon Ní Bheoláin, RTÉ
- Gráinne Seoige, TnaG, TV3 and Sky News Ireland
- Mary Kennedy, RTÉ
- Eileen Dunne, RTÉ
- Charles Mitchel, RTÉ
- Colette Fitzpatrick, Virgin Media

=== Israeli news anchors ===
- Yonit Levi, The Central Newscast ("HaMahadura HaMerkazit", Channel 2)
- Yair Lapid, Friday Studio ("Ulpan Shishi", Channel 2)
- Miki Haimovich, News 10 ("Hadashot 10", Channel 10), Channel 2 ("HaMahadura HaMerkazit", Channel 2) (retired)
- Ya'akov Eilon, Channel 2 ("Hadashot")
- Haim Yavin (retired), Mabat (Channel 1)
- Tali Moreno, News 10 ("Hadashot 10", Channel 10)
- Oshrat Kotler, News 10 ("Hadashot 10", Channel 10, former Channel 2)

=== Italian news anchors ===
- Bianca Berlinguer, TG3
- Cesara Buonamici, Studio Aperto
- Alberto Castagna, TG2
- Luisella Costamagna, Studio Aperto
- Emilio Fede, TG1, Studio Aperto, TG4
- Lilli Gruber, TG1, TG2
- Carmen Lasorella, TG3, TG2
- Enrico Mentana, TG5, TG La7
- Lamberto Sposini, TG1, TG5
- Bruno Vespa, TG1

=== Japanese newscasters ===
- Hiroko Kuniya, NHK (Japan Broadcasting Corporation)
- Shinichi Takeda, NHK
- Masako Usui, NTV (Nippon Television Network Corporation)
- Tetsuya Chikushi, TBS (Tokyo Broadcasting System)
- Yūko Andō, FNN (Fuji Television Network)

=== Latin American newsreaders ===
- Enrique Gratas, Univision
- Joaquin Lopez Doriga, Televisa
- Ilana Sod, MTV Latin America

=== Malaysian newsreadees ===
- Norashikin Abdul Rahman (later become queen consort of Sultan of Selangor), RTM
- Farit Ismeth Emir (deceased), RTM

=== New Zealand newsreaders ===
- Judy Bailey (retired), ONE News
- Hilary Barry, 3 News
- Greg Boyed, ONE News and TVNZ News At 8
- John Campbell, 3 News
- Hamish Clark, 3 News
- Suzy Clarkson, Prime News
- Simon Dallow, ONE News
- Carly Flynn, 3 News
- John Hawkesby (retired), ONE News, formerly 3 News
- Kate Hawkesby (retired), ONE News
- Samantha Hayes, 3 News
- Carol Hirschfeld, 3 News
- April Ieremia (retired), ONE News
- Richard Long (retired), ONE News
- Sacha McNeil, 3 News, formerly ONE News
- Mike McRoberts, 3 News, formerly ONE News
- Alison Mau, ONE News, formerly Prime News
- Wendy Petrie, ONE News, formerly 3 News
- Rebecca Singh, 3 News
- Neil Waka, ONE News
- Peter Williams, ONE News
- Eric Young, Prime News, formerly ONE News and 3 News

=== North Korean newsreaders ===
- Ri Chun-hee, KCTV

=== Palestinian news anchors ===
- Jamal Rayyan

=== Pakistani news anchors ===
- Shahid Masood, ARY News
- Mubashir Luqman, ARY News
- Sana Khan, Punjab TV
- Nida Sameer, Geo News
- Ashar Zaidi, Geo News
- Sajid Hassan, Samaa TV
- Kashif Abbasi, ARY News
- Azhar Lodhi, PTV News

=== Philippine newscasters ===
- Jessica Soho, formerly State of the Nation, GMA News TV (now GTV); GMA Network; Vice President for News of GMA News & Public Affairs,
- Mel Tiangco, 24 Oras, GMA Network; Executive Vice President for Chief Operating Officer, GMA Kapuso Foundation
- Vicky Morales, 24 Oras, GMA Network
- Mike Enriquez (deceased), formerly 24 Oras, GMA Network
- Arnold Clavio, formerly Saksi, currently Unang Balita, GMA Network
- Howie Severino, I Witness, GMA Network
- Pia Arcangel, 24 Oras Weekend, Saksi, GMA Network
- Ivan Mayrina, Unang Balita, 24 Oras Weekend, GMA Network
- Jiggy Manicad, formerly News TV Quick Response Team, GMA News TV now GTV, 24 Oras Weekend, GMA Network and Frontline Pilipinas, TV5 currently Una sa Lahat, TV5
- Susan Enriquez, Unang Balita, GMA Network
- Kara David, I Witness, GMA Network
- Connie Sison, Balitanghali, GMA Network
- Raffy Tima, Balitanghali, GTV
- Mariz Umali, Unang Balita, GMA Network
- Atom Araullo, State of the Nation, GTV
- Maki Pulido, formerly State of the Nation, GTV
- Emil Sumangil, formerly News TV Quick Response Team, GMA News TV now GTV currently 24 Oras, GMA Network
- Ted Failon, formerly TV Patrol, ABS-CBN now Kapamilya Channel currently Ted Failon at DJ Chacha sa Radyo5, TV5 and One PH
- Korina Sanchez, formerly Bandila and TV Patrol, ABS-CBN currently Rated Korina, TV5 and Korina Interview, Net 25
- Noli de Castro, TV Patrol, TeleRadyo Balita and Kabayan, ABS-CBN now Kapamilya Channel and TeleRadyo Serbisyo
- Karen Davila, formerly Bandila currently TV Patrol, ABS-CBN, now Kapamilya Channel
- Julius Babao, formerly TV Patrol and Bandila, ABS-CBN currently Frontline Pilipinas, TV5
- Henry Omaga-Diaz, formerly Bandila, TV Patrol Weekend, TV Patrol, ABS-CBN now Kapamilya Channel now migration in Canada
- Ces Drilon, formerly Bandila and TV Patrol Weekend now One News
- Bernadette Sembrano, formerly TV Patrol Weekend currently TV Patrol, ABS-CBN now Kapamilya Channel
- Alvin Elchico, TV Patrol, ABS-CBN now Kapamilya Channel
- Amy Perez, formerly Umagang Kay Ganda, ABS-CBN, Sakto, Kapamilya Channel and TeleRadyo
- Jeff Canoy, formerly Sakto, Kapamilya Channel and TeleRadyo currently TV Patrol Express
- Tony Velasquez, currently The World Tonight, ABS-CBN News Channel/Kapamilya Channel
- Maria Ressa, former ABS-CBN, CNN Southeast Asia News Bureau Chief, now Rappler head
- Luchi Cruz-Valdes, TV5 and One News Head of News and Information
- Erwin Tulfo, formerly TV5 and PTV now Senator
- Paolo Bediones, formerly GMA Network and TV5
- Cheryl Cosim, Frontline Pilipinas, TV5 and One PH
- Raffy Tulfo, formerly Frontline Pilipinas, TV5 now Senator
- Martin Andanar, formerly TV5 and PTV currently CGTN
- Lourd de Veyra, TV5 and One PH
- Cherie Mercado, formerly TV5 and CNN Philippines
- Jove Francisco, TV5 and One PH
- Dong Puno (deceased), formerly TV5 and ABS-CBN
- Angelo Castro Jr. (deceased), formerly ABS-CBN News Channel
- Tina Monzon-Palma, ABS-CBN News Channel
- Pia Hontiveros, formerly News Night, CNN Philippines
- Andrei Felix, formerly Sports Desk, CNN Philippines currently Frontline Pilipinas Weekend TV5
- Pinky Webb, formerly TV Patrol Weekend ABS-CBN and Balitaan, CNN Philippines currently Bilyonaryo News Channel
- Claire Celdran, formerly CNN Philippines
- Amelyn Veloso (deceased), TV5 and CNN Philippines
- Paolo Abrera, formerly ABS-CBN News Channel and CNN Philippines
- Cathy Yap-Yang, formerly ABS-CBN News Channel currently One News
- Mai Rodriguez, formerly Newsroom Weekend, CNN Philippines currently Bilyonaryo News Channel
- Rico Hizon, formerly The Final Word with Rico Hizon, CNN Philippines currently Beyond the Exchange, ANC
- Aljo Bendijo, formerly TV Patrol, ABS-CBN formerly News @ 6, PTV News and Ulat Bayan, currently Sentro Balita, PTV
- Catherine Vital, formerly Ulat Bayan, PTV News and PTV News Tonight, PTV
- Daniel Razon, UNTV
- Alex Santos, formerly TV Patrol Weekend, ABS-CBN, formerly Sentro Balita, PTV News and Ulat Bayan, PTV currently Mata ng Agila, Net 25
- Rikki Mathay, Mata ng Agila International, Net 25
- Ali Sotto, Mata ng Agila, Net 25
- Anthony Taberna, formerly ABS-CBN currently DZRH
- Rey Langit, formerly Radio Philippines Network, IBC 13, PTV,DZRJ and DZEC Radyo Agila currently Abante Radyo

=== Portuguese newsreaders ===
- Carlos Daniel, RTP1/RTP Notícias
- Cristina Esteves, RTP1/RTP Notícias
- José Rodrigues dos Santos, RTP1/RTP Notícias
- Mário Crespo, SIC Notícias
- Pedro Pinto, TVI

=== Singaporean newsreaders ===
- Glenda Chong, News 5 Tonight
- Genevieve Woo, CNA
- Zhang Haijie, Channel 8 News
- Tung Soo Hua, Channel 8 News
- Wang Zheng, Channel 8 News
- Zhao Wenbei, Channel 8 News
- Bryan Wong, Channel 8 News

=== South Korean newsreaders ===
- Sagong Sunggeun, SBS
- Joo Si-eun, SBS
- Choi Jae-won, JTBC
- Han Min-yong, JTBC

=== Soviet and Russian newsreaders ===
==== Tatar newsreaders ====
- Abdulla Dubin, Tatarstan Television and Radio Broadcasting

=== Spanish newsreaders ===
- Iñaki Gabilondo, Cuatro
- Lorenzo Milá, TVE
- Letizia Ortiz (Princess of Asturias), former TVE
- Hilario Pino, Cuatro
- Pedro Piqueras, Telecinco
- Matías Prats Luque, Antena 3

=== Sri Lankan newsreaders ===
- Vernon Corea (deceased), Radio Ceylon
- Jimmy Bharucha (deceased), Radio Ceylon

=== Swedish newsreaders ===
- Jarl Alfredius (deceased), Aktuellt, Sveriges Television
- Olle Björklund (deceased), Aktuellt, Sveriges Television
- Claes Elfsberg, Rapport, Sveriges Television
- Gun Hägglund (retired), Aktuellt, Sveriges Television
- Bengt Magnusson, TV4Nyheterna, TV4
- Katarina Sandström, Rapport, Sveriges Television
- Lisbeth Åkerman, Rapport, Sveriges Television

=== Trinidad & Tobago newsreaders ===
- Francesca Hawkins, CNC3 Nightly News

=== Turkish news anchors ===
- Jülide Gülizar, Turkish Radio and Television Corporation
- Mehmet Ali Birand, Mehmet Ali Birand'la Kanal D Ana Haber Bülteni, Kanal D
- Reha Muhtar, Son Kale, Kanal Türk
- Uğur Dündar, Uğur Dündar'la Star Haber, Star TV

=== Veneuelan news anchors ===
- Eladio Larez, El Observador Venezolano
- Pedro Montes, El Observador Venezolano
- Luis Ochoa, El Informador Venevision
- Hida Oraa, El Informador Venevision
- Silvia Cabrera, Deutsche Welle
- José Sanchez Guillot, El Informador Venevision
- Walter Parra
- Jaime Suárez
- José Tinedo Guía
- Carlos Quintana Negrón
- Francisco Amado Pernía
- Edgar Anzola
- Gladys Rodriguez
- José Antonio Zapata

=== Vietnamese newsreaders ===
- Hoàng Anh Tuấn, VTV

== See also ==
- List of ITV journalists and newsreaders
- Sky News presenters and editorial team
- List of former BBC newsreaders and journalists
