= Jeugdjournaal =

Dutch television news programme

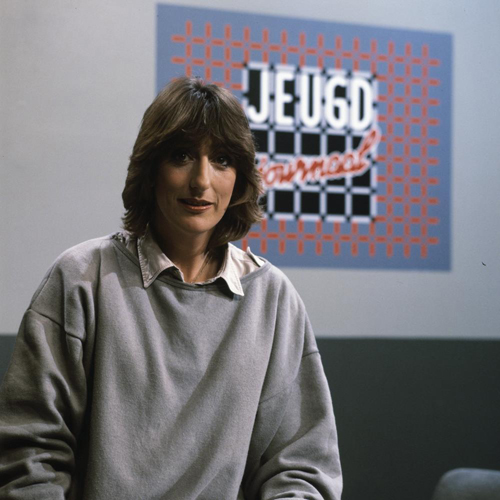
- Marga van Praag presenting in 1984.
- Genre: News; Children's television
- Presented by: Various
- Theme music composer: Cablejuice
- Country of origin: Netherlands
- Original language: Dutch

Production
- Production locations: Media Park, Hilversum
- Camera setup: Multi-camera
- Running time: 20 minutes (Main edition)
- Production company: Nederlandse Omroep Stichting

Original release
- Network: NPO 3; NPO Zapp
- Release: 5 January 1981 – present

Related
- NOS Journaal; Nieuwsuur

Jeugdjournaal (Dutch pronunciation: [ˈjøːxt.ɕuːrˌnaːl]; "Youth News Programme") is a Dutch television news programme produced by the Dutch public service broadcaster NOS for children. The programme has been on air since 1981.

The main evening programme airs at 7:00 pm (CET), running for 20 minutes every night on NPO 3. A 5-minute short version also airs on weekdays at 8:45 am. Both programmes are also broadcast on the international satellite Dutch-language television station BVN.

The aim of Jeugdjournaal was to present news that is both of interest to and within the mindset of a younger audience, without shying away from the main national and international news headlines. Because of its use of easy language and simple explanation of current affairs, the broadcasts also attracted a following with adult viewers.

== History ==
A radio news programme for young viewers titled Jeugdjournaal already existed as early as 1947 on Hilversum 2, commissioned by NCRV. By the 1950s, NTS, the predecessor to NOS, broadcast a youth current affairs programme called De verrekijker.

The idea of a televised youth news programme similar to that of the NTS Journaal arose in 1973, as research showed that there was an interest in this type of programme among children. In 1980, De Telegraaf reported that the board of NOS was not fully persuaded to have a programme similar to the BBC's Newsround, as it was not the task of the NOS to create youth-oriented programming. Other public broadcasters, such as AVRO, NCRV, KRO and TROS also protested against the idea of a current affairs programme for children. Some viewers argued that there was no need for a specified youth-orientated programme, rather the NOS should work to make the main news programme accessible to a wider audience. Ed van Westerloo, the then editor-in-chief of NOS Journaal, however called the idea an "enrichment".

Thanks to the decision of Til Gardeniers-Berendsen, then Minister of Culture, Recreation and Social Work, NOS received over a million guilders to produce Jeugdjournaal. The first broadcast was then planned for 1 October 1980 as part of a two-year trial. In May 1980, the first broadcast was delayed to 5 January 1981 as an excessive number of people had applied for the five to seven available positions for the creation of the programme.

The first Jeugdjournaal broadcast received lukewarm responses. The show's first editor-in-chief, Arno Wamsteeker, blamed it on the lack of news that very 5 January 1981. In an NRC Handelsblad article of 31 December 1981, it was noted that most children were however satisfied with Jeugdjournaal.

Jeugdjournaal was nominated for the Gouden Stuiver, the most important television prize for children's programming, a total of seven times. The programme lost out in 1997, 2002, 2003, 2004, 2006 and 2008 before finally receiving the accolade in 2009.

On 11 May 2026 NOS Jeugdjournaal won the 'Ere Zilveren Nipkowschijf' (Honorary Silver Nipkow Disk), a prestigious Dutch television and media award. This honorary disc is intended for those who have made an extraordinary effort for television.

== Presenters and reporters ==
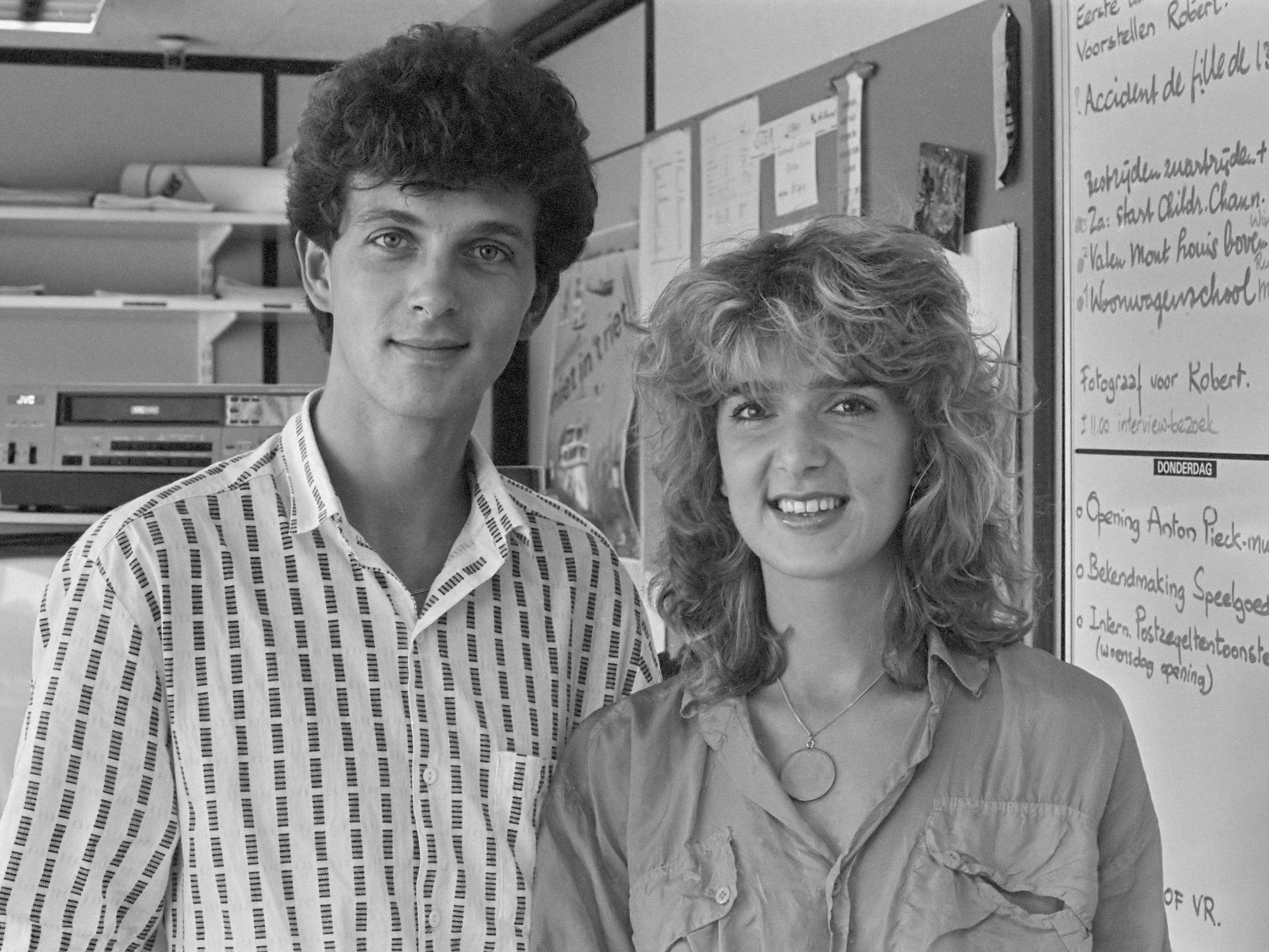
Jeugdjournaal presenters Robert ten Brink and Leoni Jansen in 1984

Current presenters and reporters:

- Joris Marseille (2012−present)
- Lucas van de Meerendonk (2017−present)
- Milou Stoop (2017−present)
- Bart Tuinman (2018−present)
- Evita Mac-nack (2019−present)
- Benjamin Kat (2019−present)
- Annabelle Zandbergen (2020−present)
- Joanke Dijkstra (2021−present)
- Sil van der Wees (2022−present)
- Egbert Ulijn (2023−present)
- Debora Post (2024−present)
- Crystalina Agyeman-Prempeh (2026−present)
- Lisa Hissink (2026−present)

Former presenters and reporters:

- Leontien Ceulemans (1981−1982)
- Marga van Praag (1981–1994)
- Harmen Siezen (1981–2002)
- Leoni Jansen (1982–1986)
- Robert ten Brink (1983–1989)
- Birgit Gantzert (1986–1991)
- Saskia Dekkers (1988–1993)
- Frank du Mosch (1989–1996)
- Gijs Wanders (1993–1998)
- Aldith Hunkar (1994–2000)
- Hans Smit (1996–2004)
- Debby Petter (1998–2001)
- Sacha de Boer (2000)
- Jeroen Overbeek (2000, 2023)
- Brecht van Hulten (2000–2005)
- Milouska Meulens (2000–2015)
- Liesbeth Staats (2001–2007)
- Winfried Baijens (2003–2006, 2016)
- Tamara Seur (2004–2021)
- Iwris Kelly (2006)
- Pepijn Crone (2006–2012)
- Roos Moggré (2008–2014)
- Nick Renooij (2009–2017)
- Tako Rietveld (2009–2015)
- Siham Raijoul (2011–2020)
- Astrid Kersseboom (2012)
- Robbie Kammeijer (2014–2016)
- Lysette van Geel (2014–2018)
- Welmoed Sijtsma (2015–2018)
- Malou Petter (2017–2019)
- Youssef Abjij (2017–2020, 2026)
- Laura Hogendoorn (2017–2021)
- Noortje Deutekom (2019–2024)

== See also ==
- Newsround (BBC)

== Related links ==
- Official website (in Dutch)
