= Amber Brantsen =

Dutch radio and television broadcaster

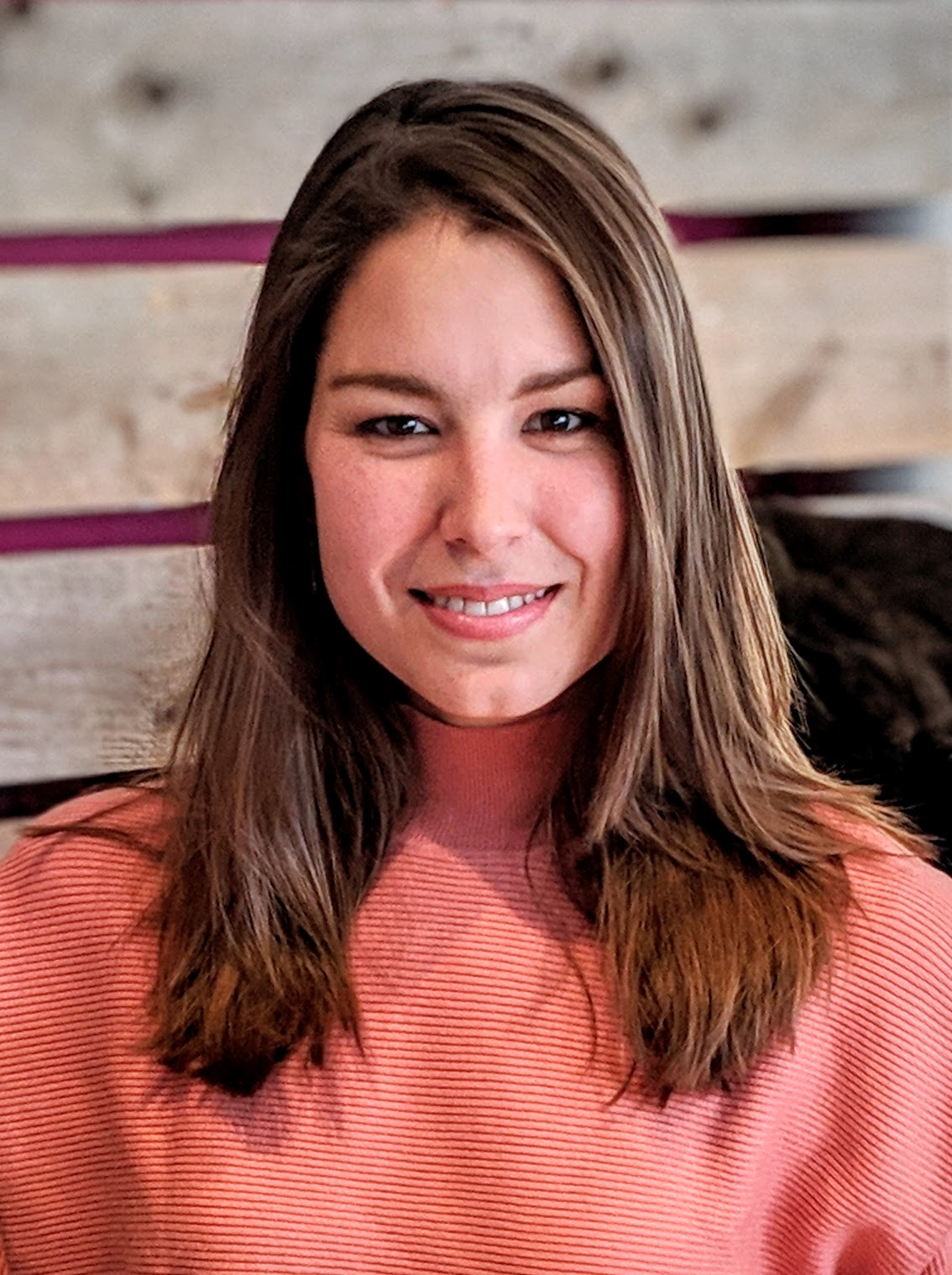
- Bransten in 2018
- Born: 9 September 1989 (age 36); Zoetermeer, South Holland, Netherlands
- Education: Leiden University
- Occupations: Broadcaster; Journalist
- Children: 2

Amber Brantsen (born 9 September 1989) is a Dutch radio and television broadcaster and journalist. She is the studio presenter of the Swedish pay streaming service Viaplay's coverage of Formula One motor racing in the Netherlands. Brantsen has worked for the radio stations Unity FM, NPO 3FM, NPO Radio 1 as a newsreader and read the news on the daily news programme NOS Journaal.

== Early life ==
Brantsen was born on 9 September 1989 in Zoetermeer, the Netherlands. Her father is from the Netherlands and her mother is from Suriname. Brantsen's grandmother is an original descendant of Suriname and her grandfather was of Chinese-Suriname descent. Her parents were divorced when she was young and she was brought up by her mother in Zoetermeer. Brantsen was educated at the De Springplank primary school, and cited the journalists Annechien Steenhuizen and Astrid Kersseboom as role models. She studied public administration at Leiden University from 2009 to 2014, having also studied for a degree in Media and Culture in Amsterdam.

== Career ==
While studying at university, she worked as a radio broadcaster at the local Leiden broadcaster Unity FM and as a freelance newsreader at Omroep West after being discovered by them. Brantsen worked as an editor and newsreader at Bureau Regio between August 2014 and January 2015. She got an internship at the domestic desk at Nederlandse Omroep Stichting (NOS). Brantsen read the news on the radio station NPO 3FM on the programme NOS op 3. In January 2016, she began co-presenting the NPO Radio 1 morning programme Radio 1 Journaal with Jurgen van den Berg. Brantsen's final programme was on 25 July 2017, and also broadcast on the radio station Kermis FM until July 2017.

She moved to television and began reading the news on the morning edition of the daily news programme NOS Journaal in August 2017. Brantsen was the replacement for Rik van de Westelaken and continued to read news bulletins on NPO Radio 1 occasionally. In 2018, she and Rob Trip co-presented the special documentary Nonsens te kijken: Amber Brantsen on fake news and hosted NOS's coverage of the Wedding of Prince Harry and Meghan Markle that May. Brantsen began presenting the evening edition of NOS Journaal on occasion in 2019, and she returned to Radio 1 Journaal to be its presenter for two Saturdays in each month from February 2019.

In February 2019, Brantsen began presenting a weekly podcast on Formula One motor racing with the former racing driver Jan Lammers and the reporter Louis Dekker, having been asked if she wanted the job every Monday after each Grand Prix. In 2020, her book, Uit beeld, was published. Bransten came up with the idea of the book in 2017 and in it, she disclosed that she suffered from the eating disorder anorexia nervosa. She left NOS at the conclusion of November 2021. Brantsen was approached by the Swedish pay streaming service Viaplay in early 2021 and accepted the offer to present its studio coverage of Formula One motor racing in the Netherlands from the 2022 season onwards after Viaplay acquired the Dutch broadcast rights from Ziggo Sport.

== Personal life ==
She has two children with her partner, the journalist Rachid Finge.

== Awards ==
In 2016, Brantsen was named Radio Talent of the Year by De Volkskrant newspaper, voted the recipient of the RadioFreak Award for Best Newsreader and she was a nominee for the Philip Bloemendal Prijs.
