= NOS op 3 =

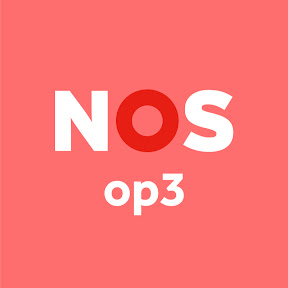
- Genre: News broadcasting
- Country of origin: Netherlands
- Original language: Dutch

Original release
- Network: NPO 3FM (6.00 - 23.00)
- Release: January 8, 2007 – present

NOS op 3 is a Dutch radio broadcasting program and a former television program of Nederlandse Omroep Stichting (NOS).

The program is a short news broadcast directed primarily to audiences between the ages of 18 and 50. The TV version of the program started being broadcast on 8 January 2007 on working days on the public channel Nederland 3 with the initial name NOS Journaal op 3, which was later changed to NOS op 3. The radio version is broadcast on NPO 3FM and FunX, which were previously known as 3FM Nieuws and NOS Headlines. In May 2011 both programs were merged into one - NOS op 3. In the summer of 2015, the NOS stopped with the TV broadcasting to continue with videos on YouTube.

== Current presenters ==
=== Radio ===
- Biem Buijs (2011–present)
- Michel Coenen (2012–present)
- Tomas Delsing (2017–present)
- Marco Geijtenbeek (2019–present)
- Jeroen Gortworst (2019–present)
- Sid van der Linden (2020–present)
- Casper Meijer (2015–present)
- Martijn Middel (2018–present)
- Joeri Stubenitsky (2011–present)
- Dieuwke Teertstra (2013–present)
- Sophie Verhoeven (2011–present)
- Wouter Walgemoed (2011–present)
- Renske van der Zalm (2021–present)
- Hanneke van Zessen (2020–present)

== Old presenters ==
=== Television ===
- Winfried Baijens (2007)
- Margriet Wesselink (2007–2008)
- Herman van der Zandt (2007–2010, 2013)
- Eva Jinek (2008–2009, 2011)
- René van Brakel (2008, 2009–2014, 2015)
- Annechien Steenhuizen (2009–2012)
- Mustafa Marghadi (2011–2015)
- Dionne Stax (2012–2013)
- Anic van Damme (2013–2015)
- Biem Buijs (2014–2015)

=== Radio ===
- Martijn van Beek
- Jurgen van den Berg (2004–2009)
- René van Brakel (2009–2014)
- Amber Brantsen (2014–2015)
- Bart Jan Cune (2008–2015)
- Margriet van der Eijk (2016–2018)
- Rachid Finge (2006–2016)
- Celine Huijsmans (2016)
- Gerard de Kloet
- Kirsten Klomp (2015–2020)
- Mustafa Marghadi (2011–2013)
- Dorald Megens
- Matijn Nijhuis (2000–2001)
- Arjan Penders (2000–?)
- Jan van de Putte
- Vincent van Rijn (2017–2019)
- Malou van der Starre (2018–2019)
- Ingelou Stol (2016–2017)
- Jeroen Stomphorst (2000–2005)
- Liselot Thomassen
- Jeroen Tjepkema
- Marrit de Vries (2019–2020)
- Peter de Vries (2000–2008)
- Fleur Wallenburg (2006–2015)
- Margriet Wesselink (2007–2008)
- Mattijs van de Wiel (2000–2008)
- Herman van der Zandt (2001–2007)
