= Ahmed Mansour (journalist) =

Egyptian television presenter

- أحمد منصور
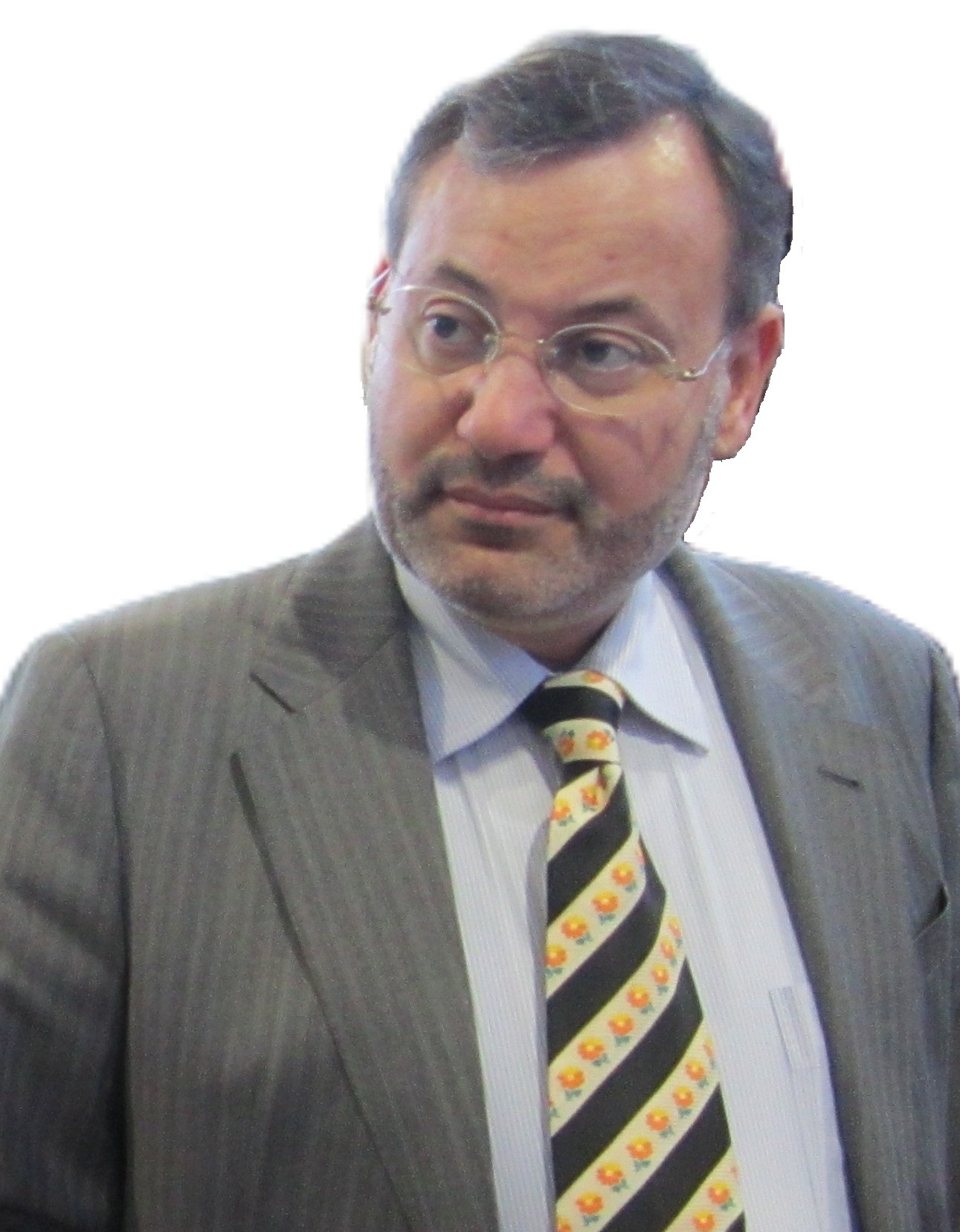
- Born: 16 July 1962 (age 64); Samannud, Egypt
- Education: Mansoura University (graduated with a B.A. in Arabic Literature in 1984)
- Occupations: Journalist, TV Host, Producer, writer
- Years active: 1980s–present
- Known for: Al Jazeera
- Website: ahmedmansour.com

Ahmed Mansour (Arabic: أحمد منصور) is an Egyptian journalist, television presenter, television host, and interviewer on Al Jazeera since 1997, and writer. He is one of Al Jazeera's prominent journalists. He presents Bela Hodod (بلا حدود, Arabic for "without borders"), an Arab live television talk show from Cairo since 1999, which airs on Al Jazeera Channel weekly. He also presents the program Shahed Ala Al-Asr. In 2009, he published the book Inside Fallujah: the Unembedded Story.

== Biography ==
He was born in the city of Samannud, in Egypt, and graduated from the Mansoura University, with a bachelor's degree in arts. His career started as a war correspondent. He covered the war in Afghanistan between 1987 and 1990, the war in Bosnia and Herzegovina in 1994, and the war in Iraq in 2004. He now leads two talk shows that are broadcast on Al-Jazeera TV: in addition to "Without Frontiers", he also presents the program "Witness on the Age". Both programs are widely viewed in the Arab World. Apart from his skills, as interviewer in the programs he conducts, Ahmed Mansour has become famous because of his outspoken political views.

Mansour has openly criticized the current al-Sisi government. He has also criticized the Muslim Brotherhood. Mansour was criticized on social media after he interviewed the then leader of al-Nusra Front, Abu Mohammad al-Julani, and a Syrian pilot captive held by the al-Nusra Front.

In August 2014, Cairo's criminal court accused Mansour of torturing a lawyer in Tahrir Square in 2011; Mansour denied the charges, and Al Jazeera said the accusations were false. Mansour was convicted in absentia in October and sentenced to 15 years imprisonment. Al Jazeera called the ruling unjust, and an effort to silence journalists. Interpol refused to issue a warrant.

On 20 June 2015, Mansour was arrested at Berlin Tegel Airport and held by German police at the request of the Egyptian government, provoking demonstrations in Germany until his release. Reporters Without Borders called Mansour's detention "Egypt's terrible revenge against journalists that cross the regime," and stated that Berlin was threatening to put itself "at the service of a dictatorial regime." Mansour was released on 22 June. According to Hans-Eduard Busemann of Reuters, "Mansour's case has put Germany in an awkward position as it tries to balance business interests and human rights."

== Books ==
Mansour has written more than 20 books in Arabic, such as:

- Battle of Fallujah: America's Defeat in Iraq (Arabic: معركة الفلوجة هزيمة أمريكا في العراق)
- Under Fire in Afghanistan (Arabic: تحت وابل النيران في أفغانستان )
- Under Fire in Sarajevo (Arabic: تحت وابل النيران في سراييفو )
- Jewish Influence in the US Administration (Arabic: النفوذ اليهودي في الإدارة الأميركية)
- The Story of the Fall of Baghdad (Arabic: قصة سقوط بغداد)

== See also ==
- List of news presenters
- List of Al Jazeera presenters
- Jamal Rayyan
- Khadija Benguenna
