= Harmen Siezen =

Dutch journalist and television presenter (1940–2025)

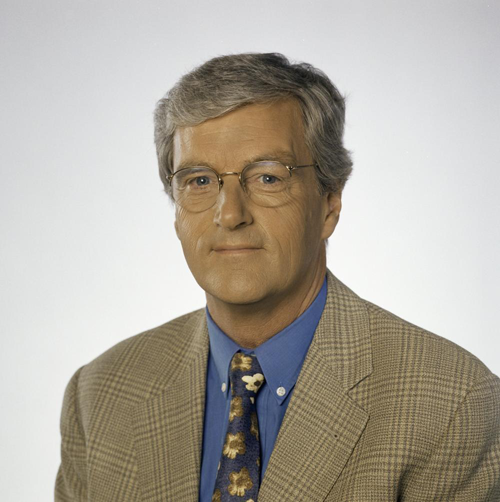
- Siezen in 1995
- Born: Harmen Reinoud Siezen; 26 December 1940; Noordgouwe, Netherlands
- Died: 5 April 2025 (aged 84); Hoevelaken, Netherlands
- Occupations: Journalist television presenter radio presenter
- Years active: 1963–2012
- Known for: NOS Journaal

Harmen Siezen (26 December 1940 – 5 April 2025) was a Dutch journalist and presenter, known for presenting the NOS Journaal from 1971 to 2002.

== Early life and education ==
Siezen was born in Noordgouwe, Schouwen-Duiveland, as the son of a pastor. During the Hunger Winter, his family lived as evacuees in Hillegersberg near Rotterdam. Siezen grew up in various places, including Zeeland, Zaltbommel, The Hague, Peize, and Rotterdam, depending on his father's pastoral assignments. In 1956, his parents divorced, which was unusual at the time, especially for a pastor's family. Siezen married in 1966 and had two children.

He attended grammar school and later studied for a year in the United States before serving in the military.

== Media career ==
Siezen began his career in 1962 at the Hague office of the news agency United Press International (UPI). From 1963, he worked at Radio Veronica, where he became known for his understated and dryly humorous presentation style, both as a DJ and a newsreader. In 1966, he joined TROS as a reporter and presenter.

In 1969, he started as a reporter for NOS Journaal, practicing as a newsreader off-camera. He was trained by Frits Thors and Rien Huizing, who taught him the nuances of newsreading, including intonation and pacing. In 2001, he was voted the best newsreader.

=== Failed venture with TV 10 ===
In 1989, Siezen took a calculated risk and joined TV10, which was set to become the first commercial broadcaster in the Netherlands. In addition to a higher salary, Siezen wanted to try something new. The NOS director warned him that if he pursued this, he would be permanently excluded from NOS. TV 10 ended in failure, and Siezen was dismissed after seven months. However, NOS had not yet found a suitable replacement for him, and Siezen returned to his old position, determined to stay. His venture, however, had consequences: NOS no longer assigned him to the Eight O'Clock News, except occasionally on Sunday evenings. After Joop van Zijl left in 1996, Siezen hoped to take his position, but the management chose Philip Freriks instead.

=== Farewell ===
After 33 years, Siezen retired from NOS Journaal on 13 September 2002, delivering the following farewell speech:

"I have done this with great pleasure; it was truly a fantastic job. But after 33 years of working on a tight schedule, it is time to call it a day."

Although he preferred a low-key farewell, his colleague Philip Freriks surprised him during his final broadcast with a bouquet of flowers, which Siezen did not appreciate. He ended his last broadcast with the words: "Ladies and gentlemen, I wish you a good evening," but was visibly annoyed by Freriks' unexpected gesture. By then, he had presented 17,000 news bulletins.

The news event that left the greatest impression on Siezen was the collision of two airplanes in Tenerife.

=== Memorable moment ===
In 1991, Siezen burst into laughter while presenting a segment about saddle pain during the Ten O'Clock News. The cause was the loud laughter of the production crew behind the glass. After the segment, the weather report with Peter Timofeeff followed, which appeared unaffected as it had been pre-recorded. The television clip was replayed with Siezen's permission by Mies Bouwman on 11 August 2002. It was also shown during NOS Journaal anniversary broadcasts in 2006 and 2016.

=== Other activities ===
From 1995 to 2007, Siezen hosted NCRV's National News Quiz, initially solo and later with Mieke van der Weij. He also presented programs for TELEAC, worked as a moderator, narrated the theater musical Rocky over the Rainbow, and was the voice-over for the RTL 5 series Dat zal ze leren!.

As a newsreader, he appeared in the youth series Thomas en Senior (1985) and the television film De trein van zes uur tien (1999).

On 6 May 2006, Siezen was a guest on Dit was het nieuws. On 22 December 2006, he participated in the Gouden Loeki 2006 awards, where he was painted green by the Blue Man Group, and an animation was projected onto his green-painted suit using chroma key technology.

In 2008, Siezen and his former colleague, newsreader Philip Freriks, performed in a comedy by Het Zuidelijk Toneel called The Great Election Show. The premiere took place on 18 October 2008, during the height of the U.S. presidential election campaign.

== Later life and death ==
Siezen did not dislike modern news broadcasting. On 5 January 2016, he was absent from the 60th anniversary of NOS Journaal, where former colleagues took turns presenting the day's bulletins. His absence was due to a serious accident in November 2015, in which he broke two cervical vertebrae. Siezen spent his final years in seclusion. He died on 5 April 2025, at the age of 84.

== Parodies ==
Van Kooten and De Bie frequently parodied Siezen in their Simplisties Verbond broadcasts on Sunday evenings before the Eight O'Clock News, introducing him with the phrase: "Harmen Siezen, we’ve got you in our sights." At one point, Siezen wore a new pair of glasses. Van Kooten and De Bie, aware of this, showed an identical pair, claiming it was offered by an eyewear manufacturer to promote their product. When the news gong sounded, Siezen quickly removed his glasses, barely noticeable to viewers, outsmarting them. He only put them back on after the first news item.

== See also ==
- List of news presenters
