= Simone Weimans =

Dutch news presenter

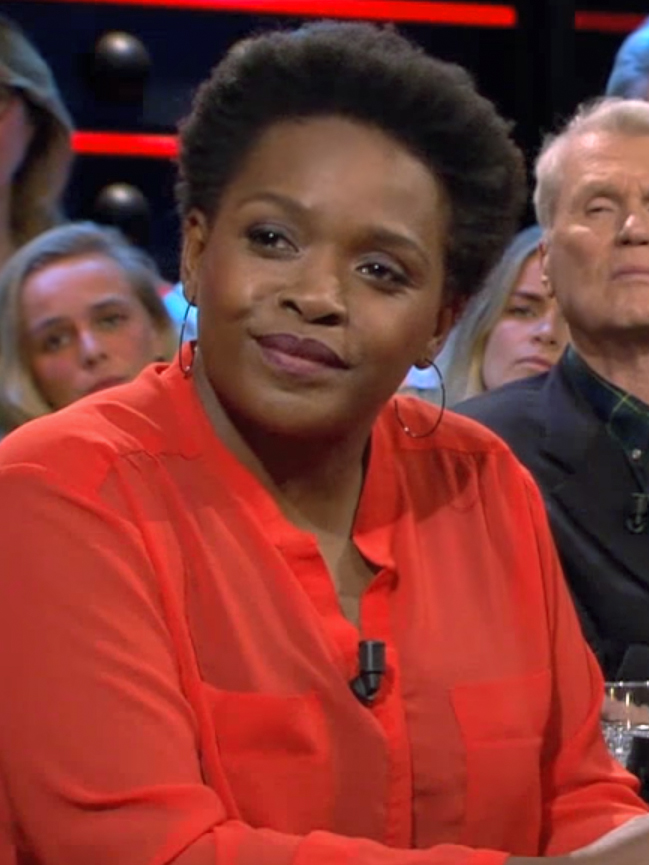
- Simone Weimans (2017)
- Born: Simone Weimans; 23 November 1971 (age 54); Rotterdam, Netherlands
- Occupations: Television presenter radio presenter
- Years active: 1993–present
- Known for: NOS Journaal, Wie is de Mol?

Simone Weimans (born 23 November 1971) is a Dutch presenter. Since 2011 she is a news presenter of the Dutch public news broadcaster NOS Journaal.

In January 2016, a NOS technician forgot to cut off from the recordings the blooper that Weimans made while preparing news items for later broadcasts. This moment was salvaged from the NOS website that same day and uploaded on YouTube, where it went viral in the Netherlands because newspaper De Telegraaf had picked up on it and wrote about it.

== See also ==
- List of news presenters
