= Noraly Beyer =

Dutch news presenter (born 1946)

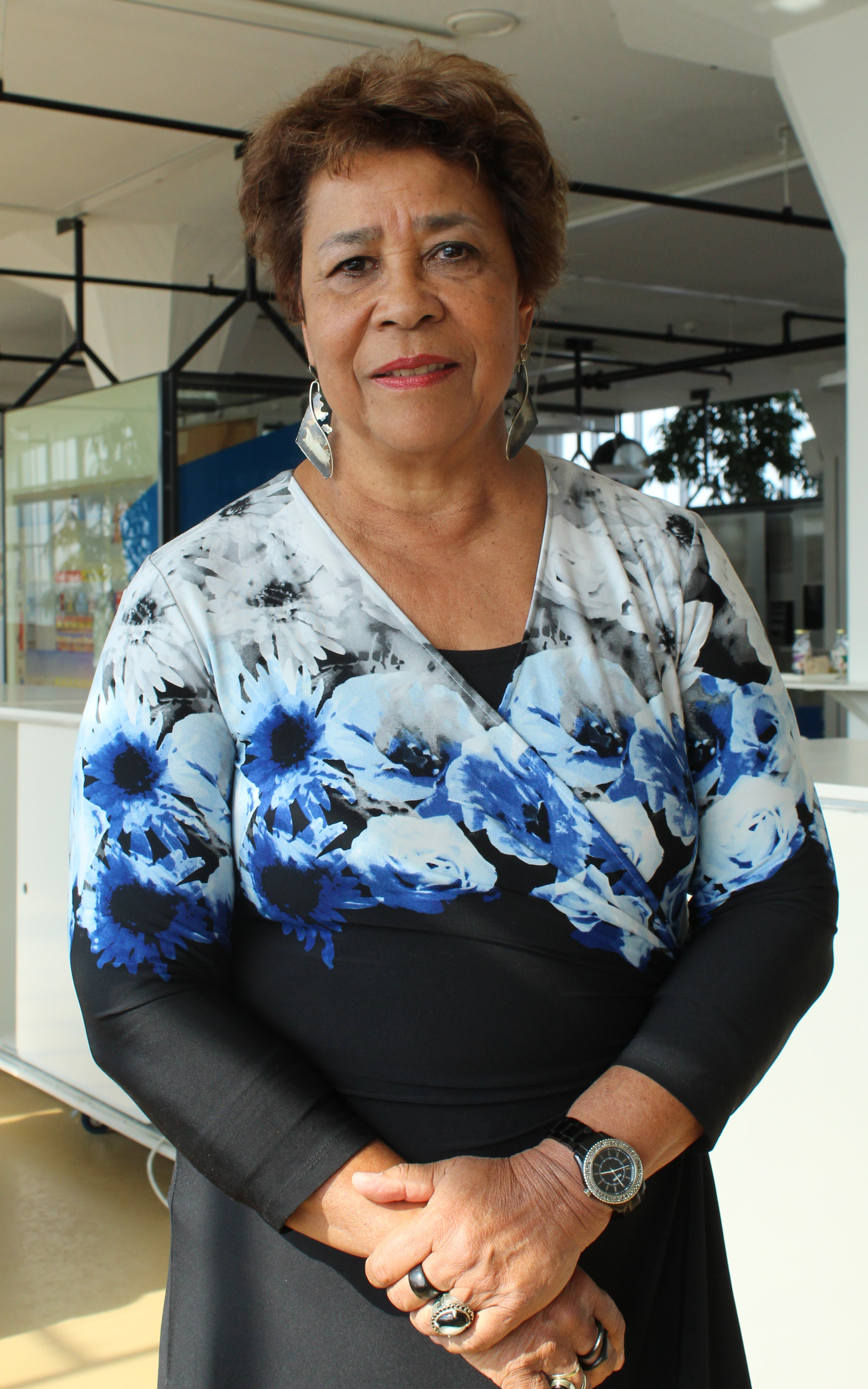
- Noraly Beyer (2019)
- Born: Noraly Beyer; 20 July 1946 (age 80); Willemstad, Netherlands Antilles
- Occupations: Television presenter; Radio presenter
- Years active: 1973–2008
- Known for: NOS Journaal, Wereldomroep

Noraly Beyer (née Oostvriesland; born 20 July 1946) is a Dutch former presenter. From 1983 to 2008, she was a news presenter of Radio Netherlands Worldwide. Beyer was a news presenter of the Dutch public news broadcaster NOS Journaal from 1985 to 2008.

== Career ==
Beyer lived in the Netherlands and she went to a boarding school (internaat) in Roermond. She also attended the Kweekschool voor onderwijzers in The Hague. Several years later, Beyer worked for the television network STVS in Suriname. She moved back to the Netherlands in 1982 after the December murders.

Beyer received the Cosmic Award in 2009 for her contributions to diversity in media. She received the award from mayor of Amsterdam Job Cohen. In 2011, she was decorated Officer in the Order of Orange-Nassau.

In 2016, Beyer became the jury chairwoman for the Woutertje Pieterse Prijs, an annual Dutch literary award for the best children's book of the preceding year. She was the narrator in the 2018 edition of The Passion, a Dutch Passion Play held every Maundy Thursday since 2011. In 2020, she interviewed multiple people about the 1982 December murders in the documentary Het is geen verleden - 08 12 1982 directed by Ida Does.

Beyer was a jury member for De Grote Poëzieprijs in 2020, a poetry award first awarded in 2019. Beyer was the jury chairwoman for the 2024 Gouden Griffel literary award.

In 2025, Beyer played Wilma in the last season of the series Oogappels. She is also a guest in a 2026 episode of the television show Boerderij van Dorst.

== Personal life ==
Beyer was born in Willemstad, Curaçao to Surinamese parents. Her father died when she was 11 years old.

She was in a relationship with Dutch actor, presenter and singer Joost Prinsen until his death in November 2025. They announced their relationship in 2021. In 2023, they both appeared as couple in an episode of the television series Nood.

== See also ==
- List of news presenters
