= Laïla Abid =

Moroccan-born Dutch news presenter and journalist

- Born: March 21, 1977 (age 49); Meknes, Morocco
- Education: Hogeschool van Amsterdam A.A. (English) 1997 - 1998 Hogeschool van Utrecht B.A. (Journalism) 1998 - 2003; Masterclass - Vrije Universiteit Amsterdam 2008
- Occupations: PR, communications
- Years active: 2003–present

Laïla Abid (born March 21, 1977, in Meknes, Morocco) is a Moroccan-Dutch journalist, and former television news presenter and news anchor. Since 2017, Abid has been working in PR and communication. She studied journalism and between 2001 and 2003 at Hogeschool van Utrecht, earning her bachelor's degree in 2003, after earning an associate degree in English from the Hogeschool van Amsterdam in 1998. She would earn her master's degree from the Vrije Universiteit Amsterdam in 2008.

In 2008 Abid worked as a newscaster for the crime programme AVRO Opsproring Verzocht. Later she worked for RTV Noord-Holland, Amsterdam FM, SBS Hart van Nederland and starting in 2007, for the commercial news station BNR Nieuwsradio. In 2008 she was added to the team of news anchors for the NOS Journaal. She presented morning and afternoon bulletins and also worked as a contributing editor for foreign affairs. Since 2018 Abid has worked in PR and communication for the Netherlands branch of ViacomCBS to promote the American shows of channels like Spike and MTV.

In 2011 Abid was voted number 88 on a list of the 100 "most powerful Arab women".
