= Hans Georg Heinke =

Austrian news presenter (born 1945)

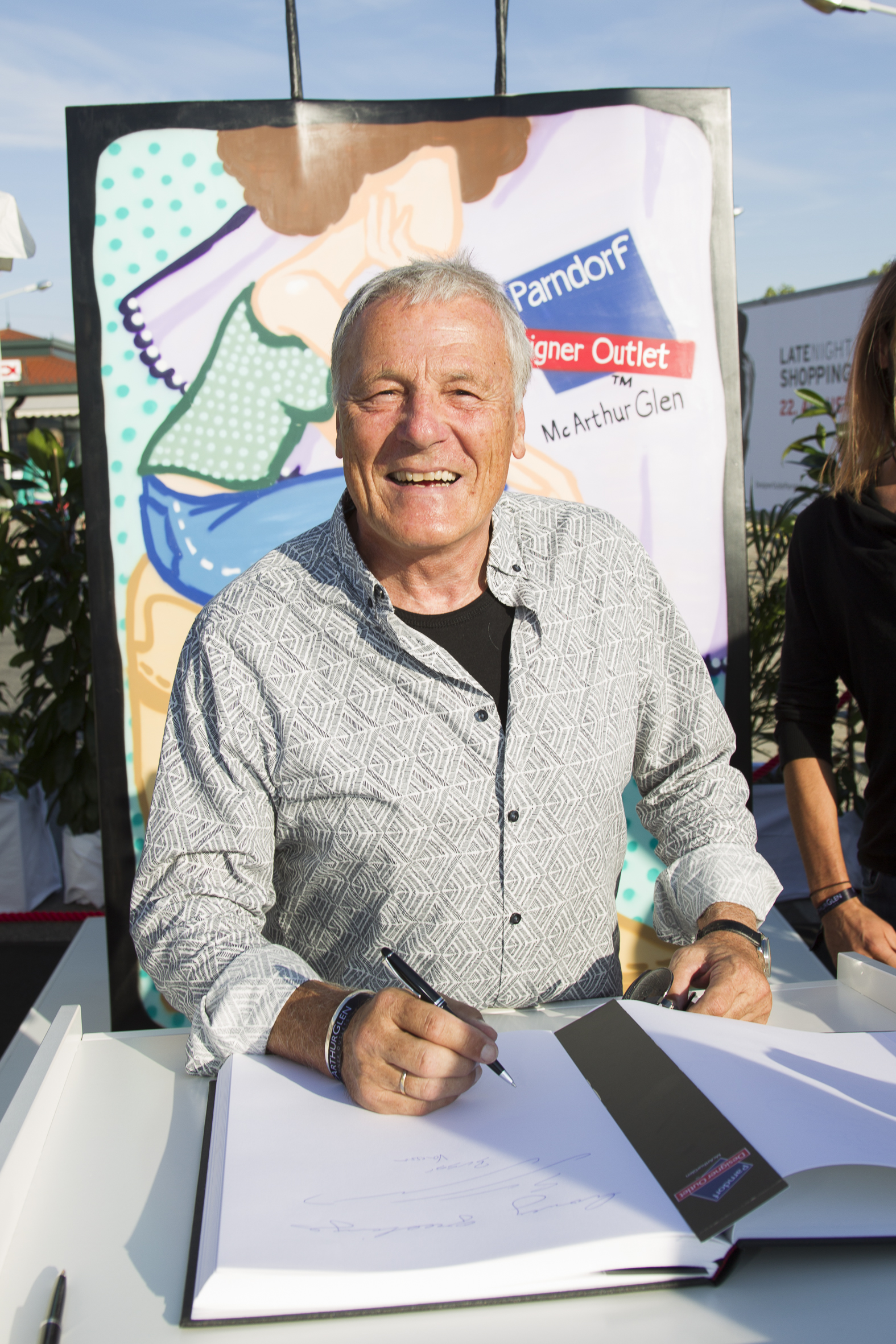
- Hans Georg Heinke (2013)
- Born: 4 January 1945 (age 81); Wiener Neustadt, Nazi Germany
- Occupations: Journalist television presenter radio presenter
- Years active: 1969–2008
- Known for: Zeit im Bild

Hans Georg Heinke (born 4 January 1945) is an Austrian former journalist and presenter. From 1969 to 2008, he was a news presenter of the Austrian public news broadcaster Zeit im Bild in ORF.

== See also ==
- List of news presenters
