= Eugènie Herlaar =

Dutch news presenter (1939–2024)

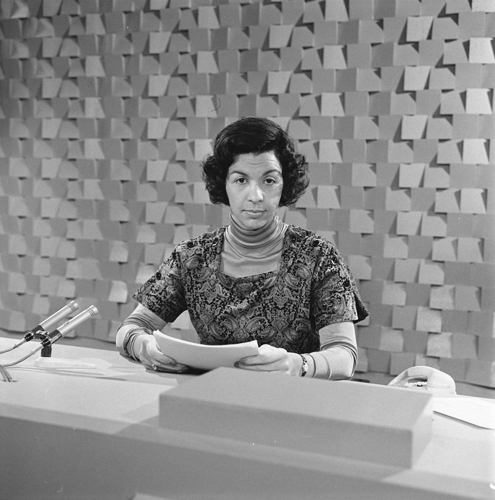
- Herlaar in 1975
- Born: 10 November 1939; Curaçao and Dependencies
- Died: 14 August 2024 (aged 84)
- Citizenship: Kingdom of the Netherlands
- Occupation: Television presenter
- Known for: NOS Journaal

Eugènie Herlaar (10 November 1939 – 14 August 2024) was a Dutch television news presenter. She is most known for being the first Dutch female news presenter of NOS Journaal in 1965.

In the 1960s it was assumed female news presenters were not desirable, and turned out from a British test of the BBC. Herlaar wrote to the NOS, she was hired and she proved the opposite. She made many reports, including the announcement of the birth of Prince Willem-Alexander. She was praised for her 'velvet voice' and received multiple prizes including twice the Order of Orange-Nassau (member in 1998 and knight in 2008) and a prize in 1966 by the “Nederlandse Vereniging voor Slechthorenden”.

Herlaar died after a short illness on 14 August 2024, at the age of 84.
