= Andrea Sanke =

American television presenter

- Born: Illinois, USA
- Education: Pontificia Universidad Javeriana, Universidad San Francisco de Quito
- Alma mater: University of Missouri (BA)
- Occupations: Television journalist, Senior presenter
- Employer(s): TRT World, France 24, Deutsche Welle; CNN International

Andrea Sanke is an American television journalist. She currently works as a senior presenter for TRT World in Istanbul.

== Career ==
After working for US broadcasters NBC and National Public Radio in the mid-1990s, Sanke was based in Bogota, Colombia, reporting for the country's national morning TV news program, 7.30 Caracol. She then worked for a year in Italy working in marketing and promotions, before returning to Chicago in late 1998 to become the midday news voice of ABC radio affiliate, Newstalk 89 WLS. In 2000, she joined JazzRadio 101.9 in Berlin as promotions director before returning to broadcasting with Germany's international broadcaster, Deutsche Welle.

In 2003, Sanke volunteered in Rio de Janeiro, Brazil, for a few months as a caretaker for abandoned and socially disadvantaged children before returning to Berlin and DW. After nearly five years presenting news and business, Sanke relocated to London, England, where she began anchoring and reporting for CNN International in various news, business and features programs. She eventually left London for Paris for the launch of France's first 24-hour international news channel in English, as the prime time presenter for France 24.

After spending three years in France, Sanke spent six years on the road, until she settled down in Cape Town, South Africa, where she taught history at the University of Cape Town to high-school students. As a registered emergency care parent, she also fostered teenage girls.

In October 2017, she was a speaker at the opening session of the TRT World Forum.

Sanke was hired in 2015 to present for TRT World, where she remains in her capacity as a journalist and senior presenter until today.

She was also a presenter at Stratcom 2023.

She was expected to be presenter at TRT World Forum 2023.

== Recognition ==
- 2008: Young Global Leader, at World Economic Forum
