= Marga van Praag =

Dutch journalist and television presenter

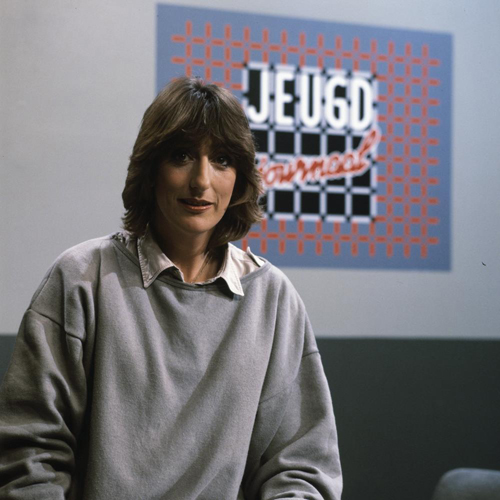
- Van Praag in 1984
- Born: September 14, 1946 (age 79); Amsterdam, Netherlands
- Occupations: Journalist, TV presenter

Marga van Praag (born 14 September 1946) is a Dutch journalist and television presenter.

Van Praag attended the academy of dramatic art in Amsterdam, and worked for VARA television from 1968 onwards. She was the host of the television programs Fanclub and De Jonge Onderzoekers (The Young Researchers), and did editing work for the shows Twee voor Twaalf (Two to Twelve) and Hoe bestaat het? (freely translated: How can it be?).

In 1981, she joined the NOS to work on the children's news programme Jeugdjournaal (Youth Journal) as a reporter and presenter, later becoming a commentator. She switched to the main NOS Journaal in 1996 as an anchor and latterly, a features reporter and commentator.

Van Praag announced her departure from the NOS in October 2008 and signed off from her final NOS Journaal report on 7 November 2008. At a farewell party, she was made a knight (5th grade) of the Order of Orange-Nassau.

== Family ==
Her brother is Chiel van Praag and her uncle is the former chairman of football club Ajax Amsterdam Jaap van Praag and her cousin is Michael van Praag.
