= Luis Ochoa =

Colombian judoka

Personal information
- Nationality: Colombian
- Born: 18 August 1966 (age 58)

Sport
- Sport: Judo

Luis Ochoa (born 18 August 1966) is a Colombian judoka. He competed in the men's half-middleweight event at the 1988 Summer Olympics.
