= Winfried Baijens =

Dutch news presenter and journalist

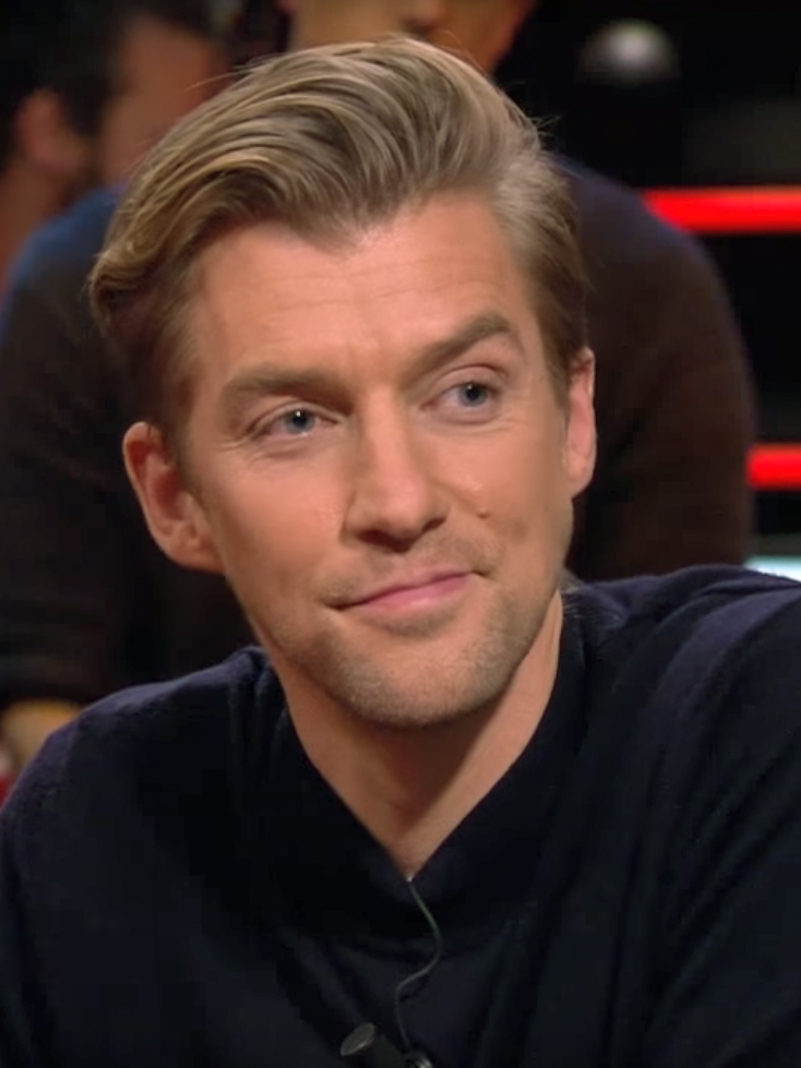
- Winfried Baijens in 2017
- Born: December 13, 1977 (age 48); Horst, Netherlands
- Occupations: Journalist; news presenter
- Known for: NOS, NPO Radio 1, NPO Radio 6

Winfried Baijens (born 13 December 1977) is a Dutch news presenter and journalist.

He presents the NOS Journaal and Met het Oog op Morgen for the NOS and produces various TV programmes and podcasts for the broadcaster.

== Career ==
Although born in Limburg, Baijens does not identify as a Limburger; his family moved in his first year to Philippine in Zeelandic Flanders, where he grew up and completed secondary school and held various holiday jobs, including as a swimming supervisor.

He studied journalism at Tilburg University and worked for four years on the current affairs programme NOVA, including a notable 2001 interview with Khalil El Moumni alongside Hein Hansen.

From 2003 to 2007, he was a reporter and presenter for the NOS Jeugdjournaal. He spent a year alternating with Margriet Wesselink on NOS Journaal op 3, occasionally also as a reporter. Later, he hosted Winfrieds Woonkamer on NPO Radio 6 from Monday through Thursday evenings; earlier, he briefly managed singer Wouter Hamel, with whom he traveled internationally. He also presented BNN Today on NPO Radio 1, usually with Willemijn Veenhoven and occasionally contributed to NOS Evenementen starting in 2006. In November 2015, Baijens was appointed presenter of the NOS Journaal, beginning in January 2016. He also presents the NOS Radio 1 Journaal on Saturday mornings and serves as weekday substitute presenter for Jurgen van den Berg.

In April 2024, he was announced as a presenter of Met het Oog op Morgen on NPO Radio 1, alternating on Wednesdays with Rob Trip and succeeding Herman van der Zandt.

In 2019, he temporarily filled in for Rob Trip as presenter of the Achtuurjournaal and during the provincial elections debate. Later that year, he launched the series Achter de headlines on NOS’s YouTube channel, and on 16 September presented The Bridge to Liberation in Arnhem. On 15 August 2023, he also presented the Dutch National Commemoration broadcast of 15 August 1945.

== Documentaries and Podcasts ==
Baijens produced several documentary series for the NTR:

- *Het Water Komt* (2023) – about the North Sea flood of 1953
- De Aarde Beeft (2024) – about Groningen’s gas extraction
- Het Stof Daalt (2025) – about mining and society in Limburg

In 2025, he also created the podcast De Wadden, een andere oorlog, about the liberation of the Wadden Islands during World War II.

== Awards ==
Baijens received the Gouden Tape (TV talent award) from the Netherlands’ Editors‑in‑Chief Association, and the Cinekid Audience Award for Jeugdjournaal Jaaroverzicht (2003). In December 2006, he ranked third on the Expreszo 100 list, which recognizes prominent individuals positively expressing their homosexuality.

== Selected Work ==
=== Television ===
- Jeugdjournaal (2003–2007)
- NOS op 3 (2007)
- NOS Journaal (from 2016)
- The Bridge to Liberation (2019)
- Het Water Komt (2023)
- De Aarde Beeft (2024)
- Het Stof Daalt (2025)

=== Radio ===
- Winfrieds Woonkamer (NPO Radio 6)
- BNN Today (NPO Radio 1)
- NOS Radio 1 Journaal
- Met het Oog op Morgen (from 2024, NPO Radio 1)
