= Annechien Steenhuizen =

Dutch journalist, reporter and television presenter

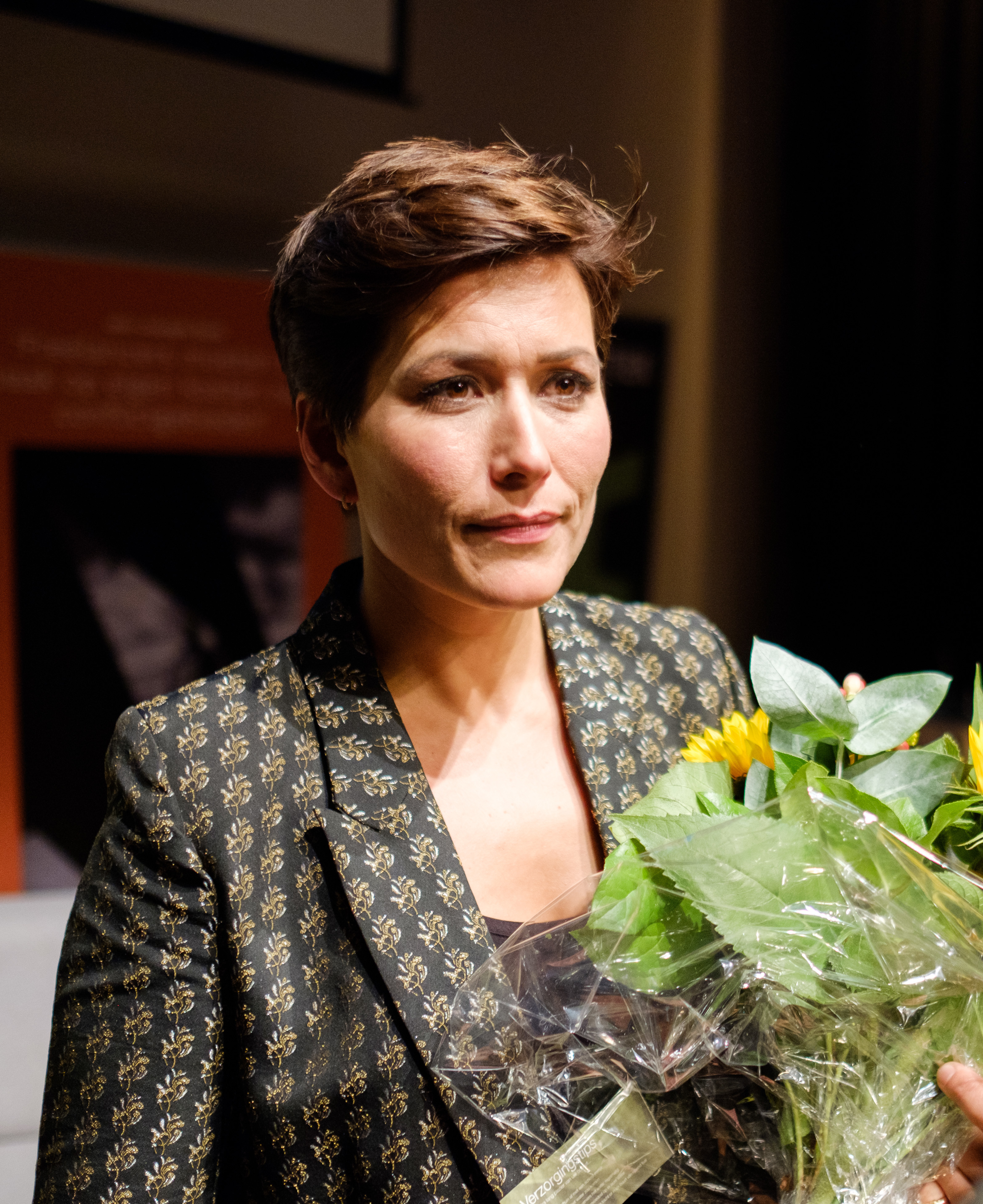
- Annechien Steenhuizen at the 2017 Journalism Festival
- Born: 12 May 1977 (age 49); Amersfoort, Netherlands
- Occupations: Journalist television presenter radio presenter
- Years active: 2000–present
- Employer: NOS

Annechien Steenhuizen (born 12 May 1977) is a Dutch journalist, reporter and television presenter. From 2013-2024, together with Rob Trip, she was one of the two permanent presenters of the eight o'clock news of the NOS Journaal.

== Biography ==
Steenhuizen was born on 12 May 1977 in Amersfoort. She grew up in Scherpenzeel and from the age of ten she lived in Doorn, where she completed her secondary education at the Revius Lyceum. She attended the School for Journalism in Utrecht from 1995 to 1999.

== Career ==
After her study Journalism, Steenhuizen started at RTL Nieuws. She worked for more than three years on the editorial staff of 5 in the Land and RTL Nieuwsmagazine, the predecessor of Editie NL.

In June 2002 she started at Radio M Utrecht as a reporter. Not long after that, Steenhuizen was also allowed to do television work. A few times a month she presented the Bureau Hengeveld program, the investigation program of Regio TV Utrecht. In April 2005 she presented the news magazine U Today together with Conny Kraaijeveld, Hilde Kuiper and later also with Evelien de Bruijn. She also continued to do live radio coverage and was the permanent substitute presenter of the radio program Aan Tafel.

From 1 March 2008, Steenhuizen worked for a year on the VARA program De Wereld Draait Door as one of the "Jackals".

=== NOS Journaal ===
In March 2009 she became one of the regular presenters of the NOS Journaal on 3, later NOS op 3, and on 29 September, she presented the NOS Journaal for the first time at 10 pm. Since 1 November 2011 Steenhuizen has been one of the regular presenters on the NOS Journaal. She mainly presented daily newsreels and was a substitute for the Zesuurjournaal, Nieuwsuur and the late news. Steenhuizen presented Nieuwsuur and the late news for the first time on 13 March 2013. In addition, she presented an extra newsreel about the election of Pope Francis at 7 pm. On 13 May, she succeeded Sacha de Boer on the eight o'clock news. Annechien presents during the odd week numbers and Rob Trip during the even week numbers. "Due to family circumstances", Steenhuizen was absent from television presenting between September 2024 and November 2026.

== Personal life ==
Steenhuizen has a partner and two children.
