= Joop van Zijl =

Dutch journalist and presenter

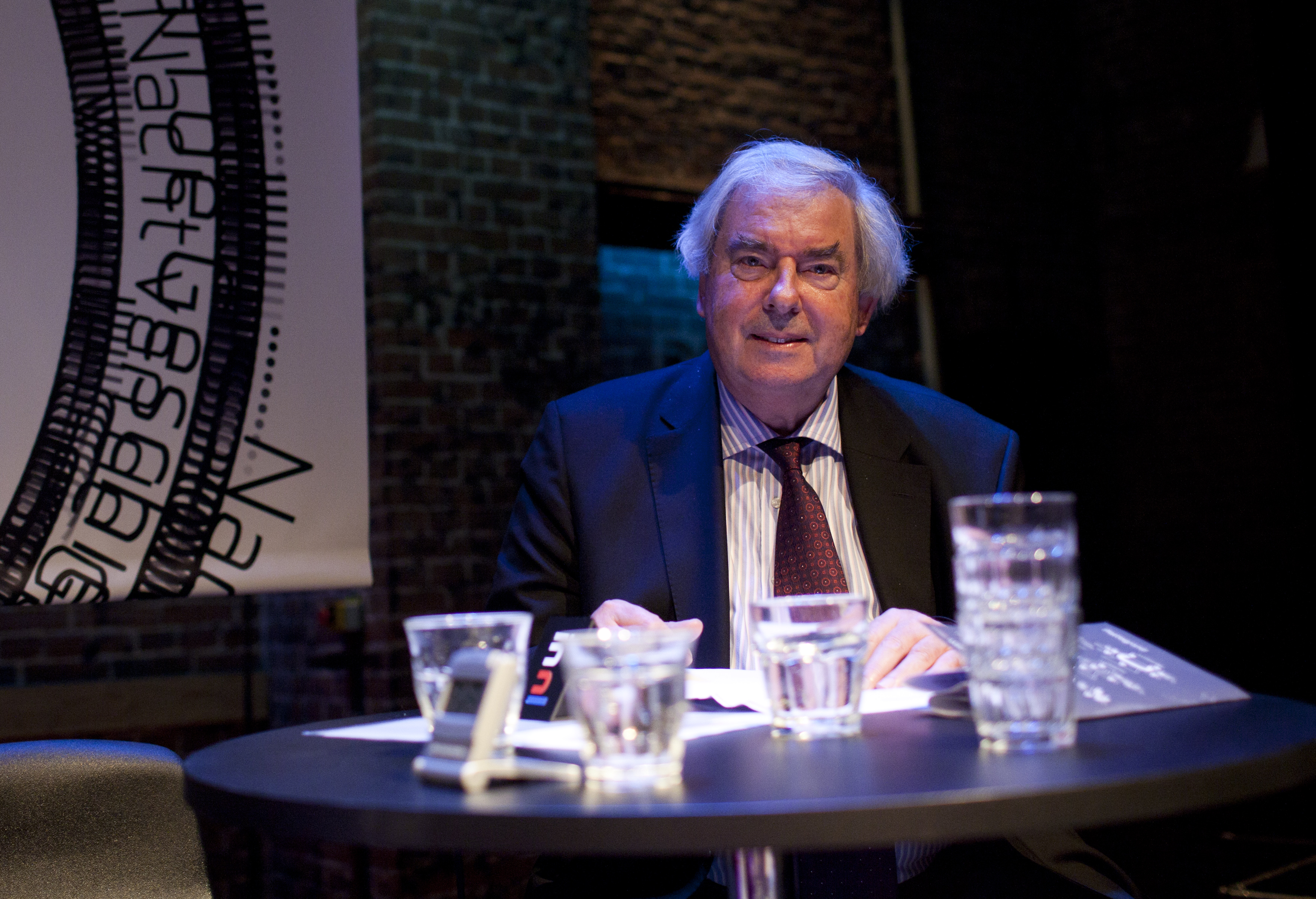
- Joop van Zijl (2010)
- Born: Gerhard Johan Jozef van Zijl; 23 January 1935 (age 91); Haarlem, Netherlands
- Occupations: Journalist television presenter
- Years active: 1954–2018
- Known for: NOS Journaal

Joop van Zijl (born 23 January 1935) is a Dutch former journalist and television presenter. From 1977 to 1996 he was a news presenter of the Dutch public news broadcaster NOS Journaal.

== See also ==
- List of news presenters
