= Masako Usui =

Japanese newsreader (born 1968)

Masako Usui (笛吹 雅子, Usui Masako; born May 2, 1968, in Nara, Nara) is a newscaster in Japan, and a former Nihon Terebi announcer.
