= Leoni Jansen =

Dutch singer (born 1955)

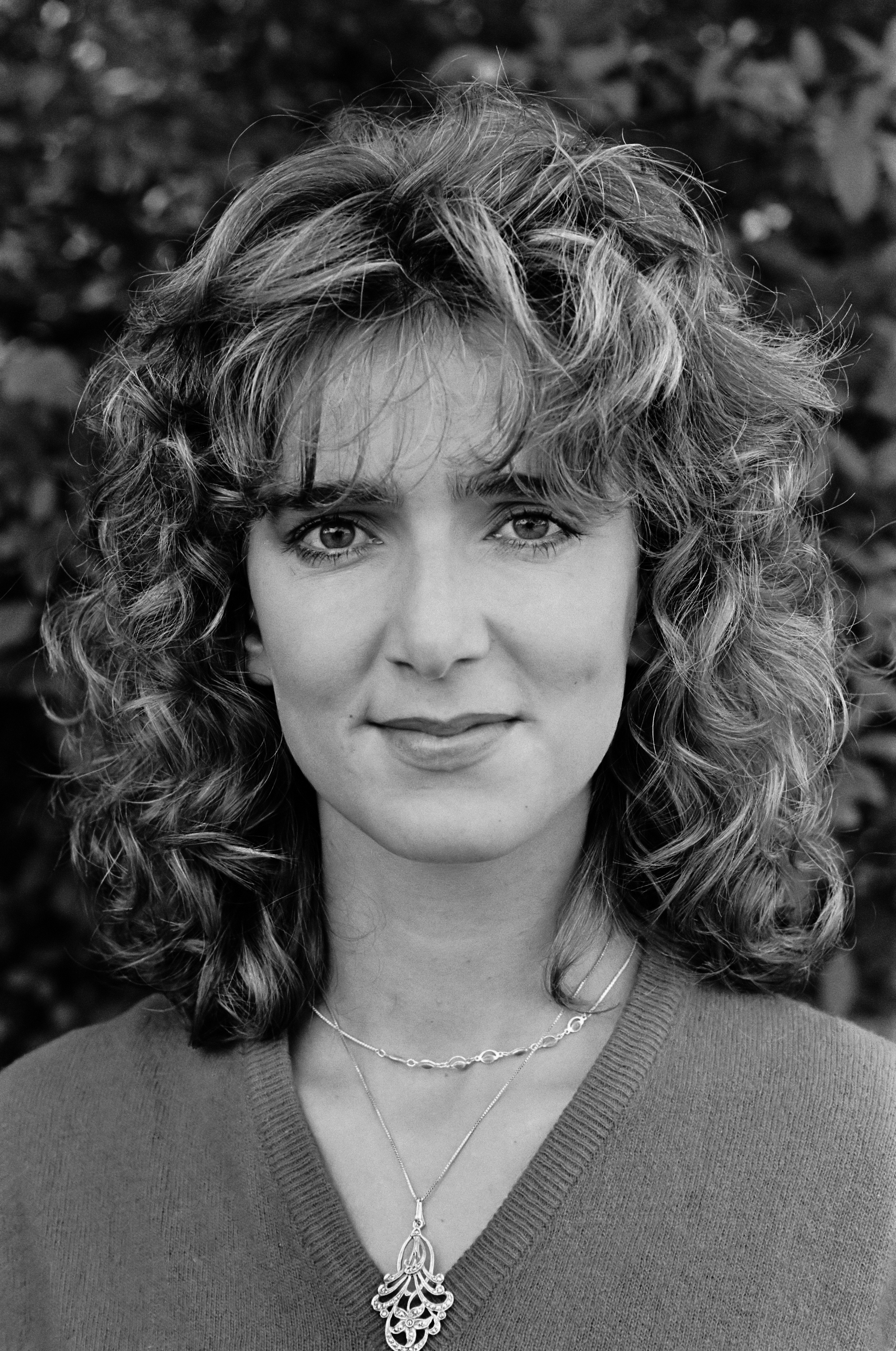
- Leoni Jansen (1982)
- Website: http://www.leoni.nl/

Leoni Jansen (born 18 September 1955) is a Dutch singer who performs American folk music and Celtic music. She is well known for her work in television during the 1980s.
