= Jamal Rayyan =

Palestinian journalist and broadcaster (1953–2026)

- جمال ريان
- Born: 23 August 1953; Tulkarm, Palestine
- Died: 15 March 2026 (aged 72); Qatar
- Other name: Abū Murād (kunya)
- Occupations: Commentator; news anchor; journalist; syndicated columnist
- Years active: 1974–2026
- Height: 180 cm (5 ft 11 in)

Jamal Rayyan (Arabic: جمال ريان; 23 August 1953 – 15 March 2026) was a Palestinian journalist and media personality notable for his career with the Al Jazeera Media Network and the BBC.

== Life and career ==
Jamal Rayyan was born in Tulkarm in the West Bank, then administered by Jordan, on 23 August 1953. He held Jordanian citizenship.

From 1974 to 1989, Rayyan worked as a news reporter and presenter for the Jordan Radio and Television Corporation in Amman, Jordan.

Rayyan worked as a news reporter for the Korean Broadcasting System. He also worked for the BBC Arabic World Service in London and for Emirati television.

Rayyan joined the Al Jazeera network in Doha, Qatar, when it was created in 1996. He was the first broadcaster to appear on the Al Jazeera Arabic channel and presented its first news bulletin. He assisted in the channel's creation and in training and mentoring news presenters. Rayyan participated in news coverage of Iraq War, the War in Afghanistan, and the Arab Spring.

Rayyan died in Qatar on 15 March 2026, at the age of 72.

== See also ==
- List of news presenters
