= Vineet Malhotra =

Anchor

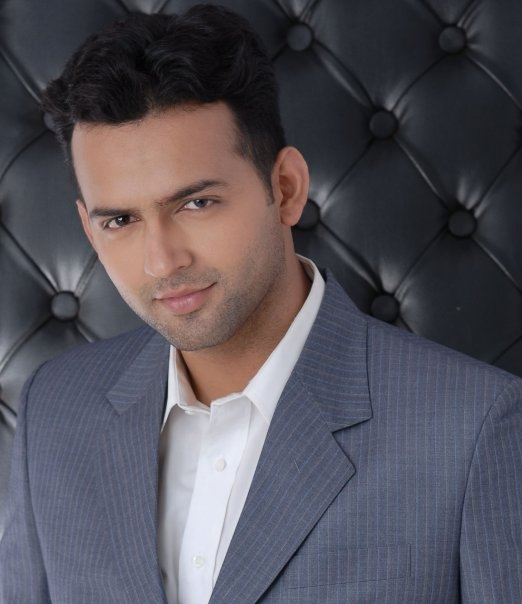
Vineet Malhotra

Vineet Malhotra is an Indian Television anchor and journalist working with NewsX as a prime time debate show host and consulting editor.

== Early life and education ==
He was born in London, England on 14 October 1978. His father was a diplomat who worked for the Ministry of External Affairs. As a result of his father’s foreign trips Vineet grew up in six different countries and was exposed to a multitude of cultures. He grew up in England, Kuwait, Saudi Arabia, Russia and the United States. He was educated at Delhi Public School R K Puram in New Delhi and at UCSF in California, USA.

== Early Days & Cricket ==
Vineet started his TV career with Zee Sports in 2005. He began by presenting cricket shows with the likes of Kapil Dev, Pataudi, Navjot Singh Sidhu, and Ricky Ponting. He later moved to Ten Sports and then to Neo Cricket. It was at the latter that he devised a program, Baat & Bowl, which was an interactive show that delves into the lives of cricket stars in India. Some of the more notable cricketer super stars like Virat Kohli, R. Ashwin, Ajinkya Rahane cast their first impressions on Malhotra's show.

His reputation as a specialist sports anchor caused him to be invited by national TV channel Doordarshan to host the biggest sports event in the history of India, the 19th Commonwealth Games. Subsequently, he hosted the 16th Asian Games for the same channel.

Malhotra worked as a freelance sports anchor and worked extensively with Times Now. He worked as the executive editor with News World India and hosted their prime time debate show "Current Issues"

Malhotra was recently honored with the 'Excellence in Sports Journalism Award, by Sports Rehab

He is currently working with NewsX !

== Other interests ==
While studying in the USA Vineet began to learn classical piano under the tutelage of Robert Boon, a concert pianist. Finding an affinity with classical composers such as Beethoven, Mozart and Bach, Malhotra mastered playing the instrument.

In 2009 he met Rajan Adlakha, an architect, at a school reunion and together they decided to form an electro-danceband called Shadow. They posted music on MySpace and were spotted by a music producer in Malaysia who encouraged them to participate in an award for independent artists. They were nominated in 12 categories and became the first ever band from India to win an award at the Asian Pacific Voice Independent Music Awards (AVIMA), where they were placed third in the electro/dance category. They promoted their own genre of music, which they call World Progressive Sound.
