= Cristina Esteves =

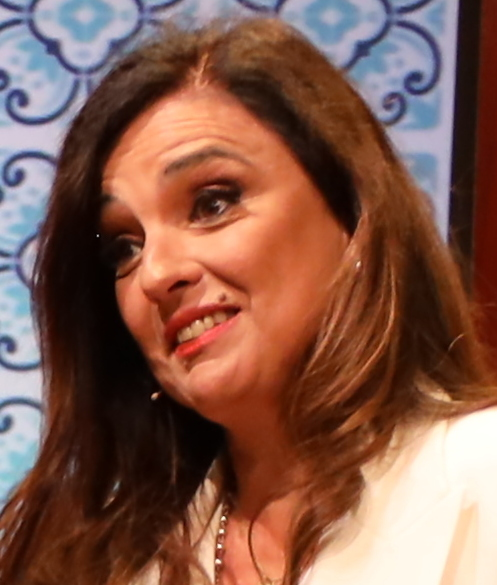
- Born: 31 October 1972 (age 53)
- Occupation: Journalist

Cristina Esteves (31 October 1972) is a Portuguese journalist.

Esteves graduated in law at the Faculdade de Direito of University of Lisbon. Between 1991 and 1996, she was a presenter at RTP, having starred in programs like "Grande Área", with Mário Zambujal and "Você Decide". She has worked as journalist and pivot on the Portuguese public television channel since 1996.

== Personal life ==
Esteves has three children.
