= Noordgouwe =

- Village
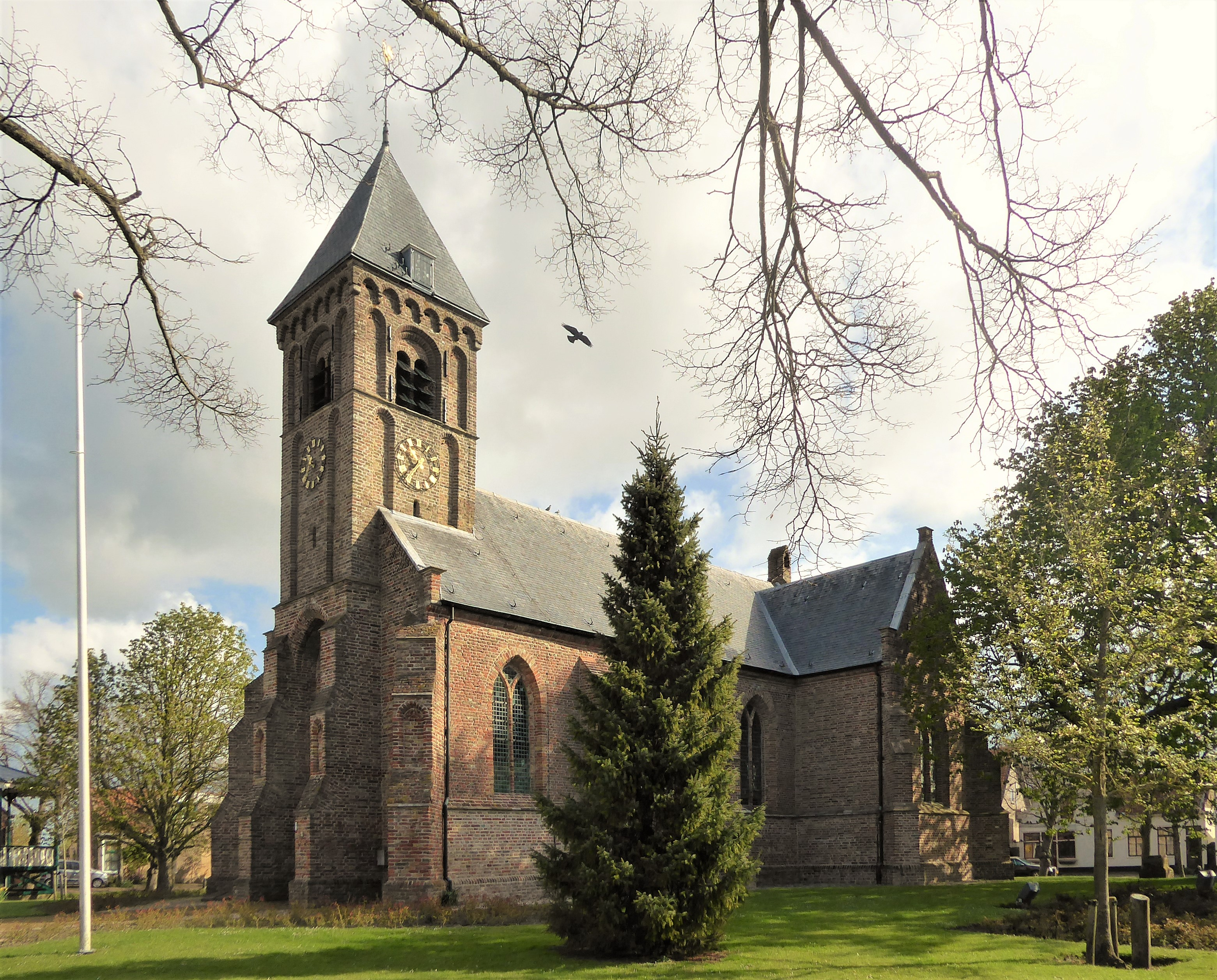
- Three Kings Church

- Coat of arms

- Location in the province of Zeeland in the Netherlands Noordgouwe (Netherlands)
- Coordinates: 51°41′37″N 3°56′19″E
- Country: Netherlands
- Province: Zeeland
- Municipality: Schouwen-Duiveland

Area
  - Total: 5.67 km^{2} (2.19 sq mi)
- Elevation: 0.6 m (2.0 ft)

Population (2021)
  - Total: 405
  - Density: 71.4/km^{2} (185/sq mi)
- Time zone: UTC+1 (CET)
  - Summer (DST): UTC+2 (CEST)
- Postal code: 4317
- Dialing code: 0111

Noordgouwe is a village in the Dutch province of Zeeland. It is a part of the municipality of Schouwen-Duiveland, and lies about 12 km north of Zierikzee.

== History ==
The village was first mentioned in 1395 or 1396 as Noortgouda. It has been named after De Gouwe river which separated Schouwen from Duiveland. Noord (north) was the location of the polder on the island. In 1374, permission was granted to polder the salt marshes. Noordgouwe is a circular village around a church which is surrounded by a moat. The village used to be a heerlijkheid.

In 1434, the Carthusian monastery Sion was founded near Noordgouwe. In 1568, during the Reformation it was abandoned and later demolished. The Dutch Reformed church was originally dedicated to the Three Kings' Day. The tower was built shortly after 1462 and contains the entrance to the church. The church was rebuilt after it was destroyed by Spanish troops in 1576. It was restored and extensively modified in 1846.

Noordgouwe was home to 625 people in 1840. It was a separate municipality until 1961, when it was merged with Brouwershaven. In 1997, it became part of the municipality of Schouwen-Duiveland.

== Gallery ==
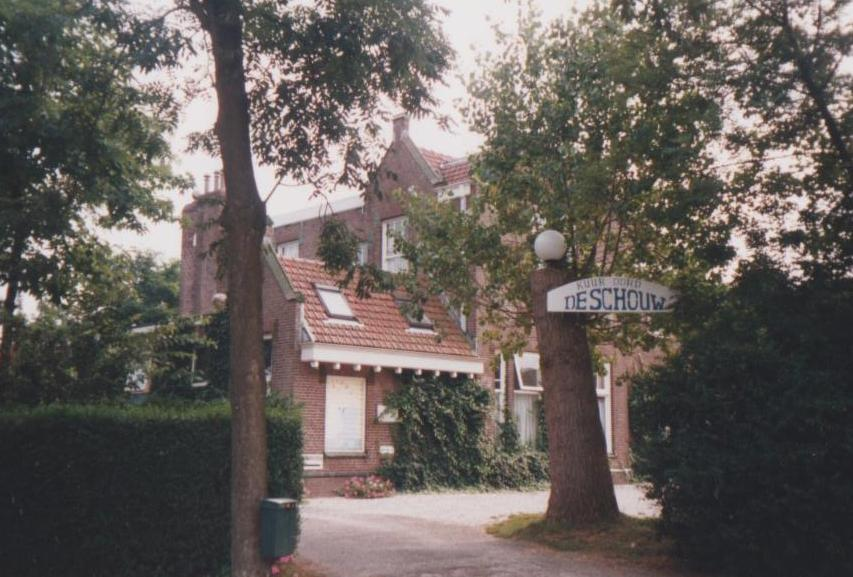
Former hospital

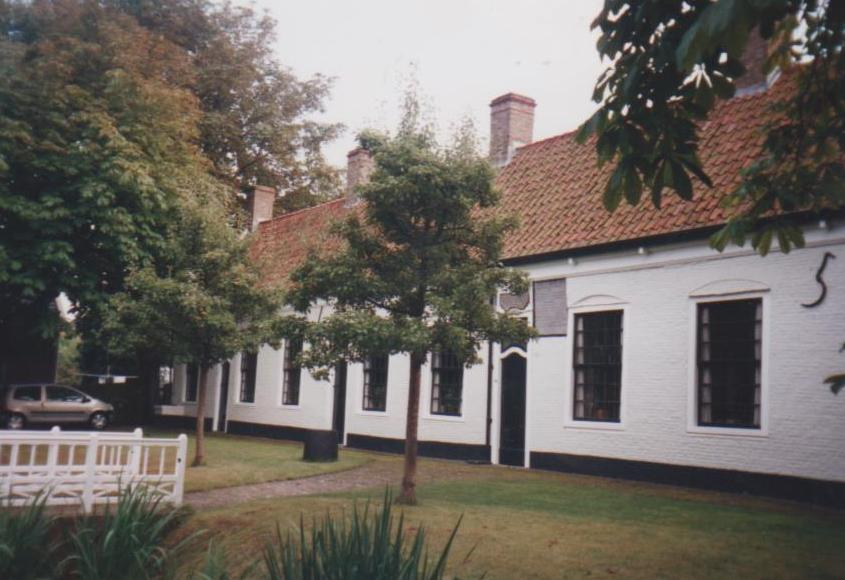
Former widow houses in Noordgouwe

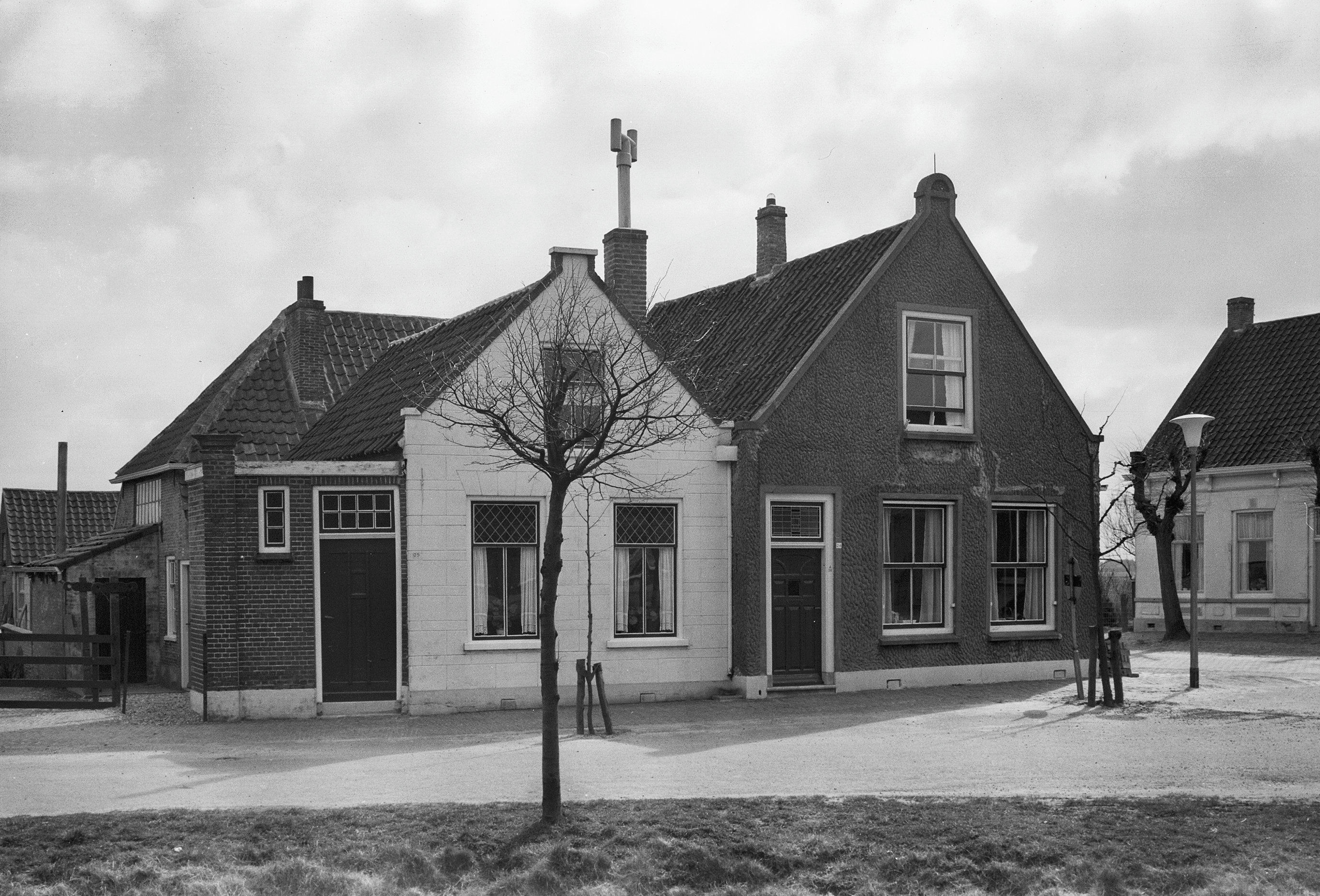
Street view (1962)
