= Jeroen Overbeek =

Dutch journalist and television presenter

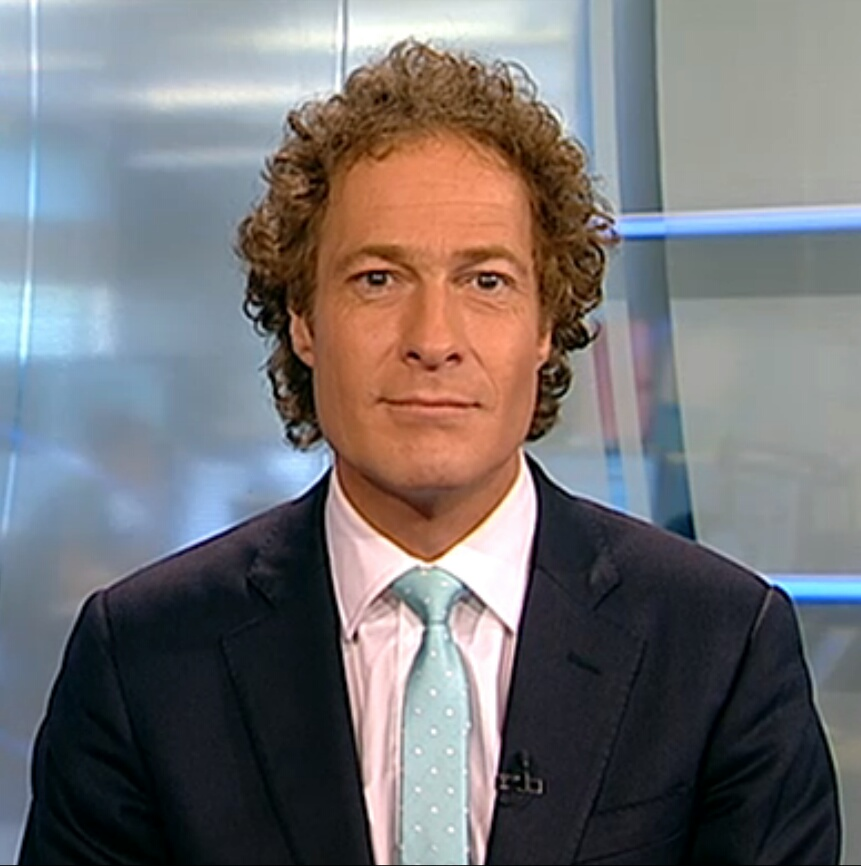
- Overbeek in 2014
- Born: April 25, 1966 (age 59); Haarlem, Netherlands
- Occupations: Journalist, news presenter
- Employer: NOS
- Known for: Presenter of NOS Journaal and Nieuwsuur

Jeroen Overbeek (born 25 April 1966) is a Dutch journalist and news presenter.

== Biography ==
Overbeek studied law, specializing in constitutional and administrative law, before beginning his career in journalism. He started working for NOS in 1989 in various roles including presenter, editor, reporter, and talent coach, active across radio, television, and online media.

He is best known as a presenter of NOS Journaal and Nieuwsuur, and also presents NOS in Makkelijke Taal. Earlier in his career, he worked as a newsreader and editor for the ANP and NOS Radio.

Overbeek has anchored coverage of major breaking news events, including the fall of Baghdad in 2003, the 2009 attack on the Dutch royal family, the 2015 Paris attacks, the failed 2016 Turkish coup d'état attempt, and the murder of Peter R. de Vries in 2021. He has also served as commentator during national commemorations such as the National Remembrance Day on 4 May, and was commentator during the day of national mourning in 2014 following the MH17 disaster.

Beyond broadcasting, he has trained journalists as a coach at NOS and as a guest lecturer at universities. He has also contributed to international media training programs for professionals in Africa and Asia.
