= Astrid Kersseboom =

Dutch news presenter

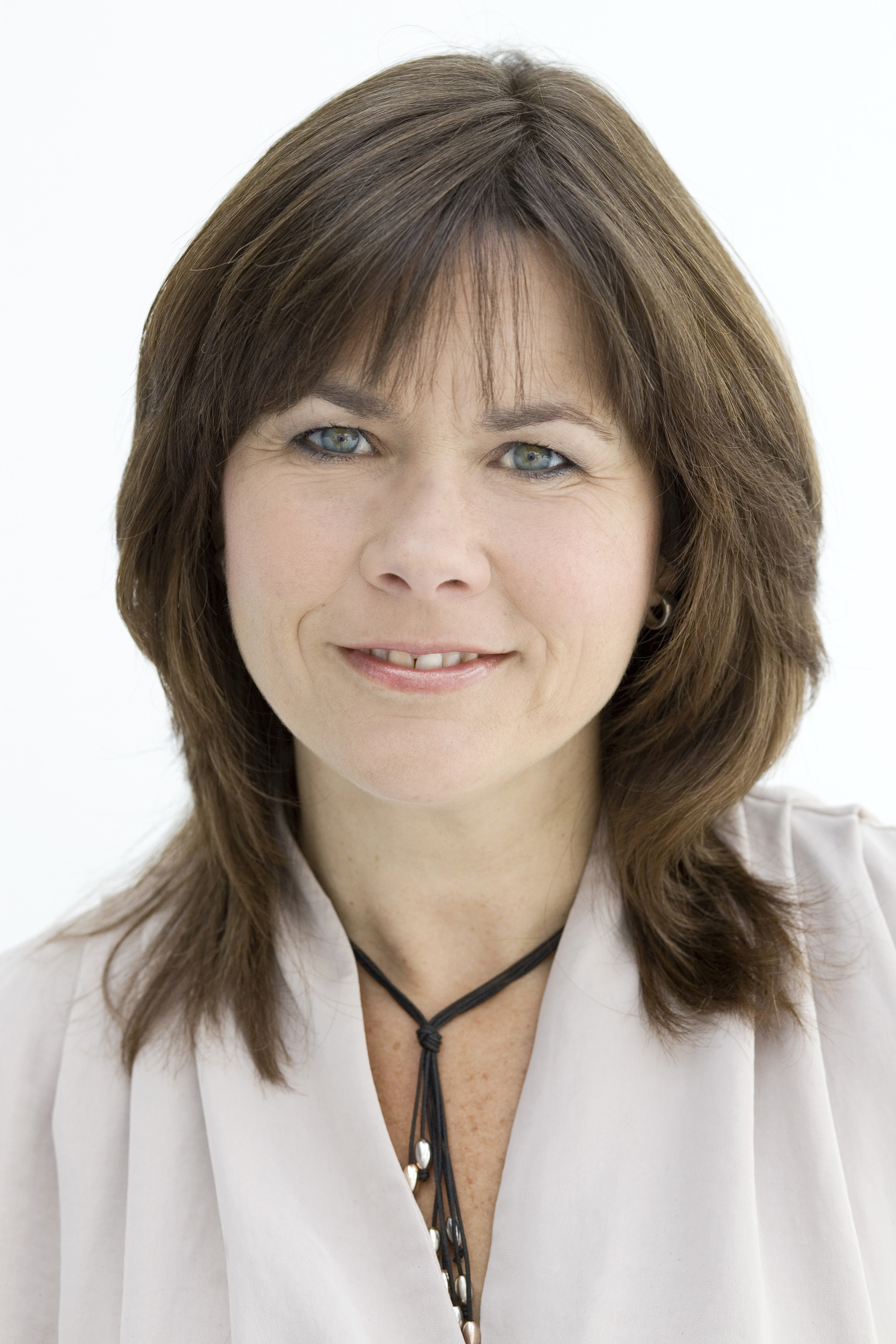
- Born: January 14, 1966 (age 60); Vlaardingen, Netherlands
- Occupation: Presenter
- Years active: 1998 – present
- Known for: NOS, NPO Radio 1

Astrid Kersseboom (born 14 January 1966 in Vlaardingen) is a Dutch television presenter. She gained prominence presenting the NOS Journaal and later as the main presenter of the NOS Radio 1 Journaal on NPO Radio 1.

== Career ==
Kersseboom graduated from the Academy of Journalism in Tilburg before taking up a role as corporate journalist at Energiebedrijf Rotterdam for a year. She then moved to Omroep Brabant in 1988.

Since 1998, she has worked at NOS, initially as a newsreader for radio bulletins. In 2001 she switched to television, joining Studio Sport and appeared regularly in the NOS Journaal from 2004 onward.

=== Television ===
In 2004, she fully transitioned to the NOS Journaal, anchoring at various times and becoming the regular presenter of the Saturday 8 pm bulletin. During weekdays, she served as the chief substitute for anchor Sacha de Boer.

She presented the annual NOS Journaal year-in-review in both 2006 and 2008, and anchored numerous royal family broadcasts for NOS Events. Beginning in 2007, she presented televised coverage of royal events on Queen’s Day (and later King’s Day). In 2013, she anchored both the investiture of King Willem-Alexander (30 April) and the 200th-anniversary celebration of the kingdom (30 November). When Sacha de Boer stepped down in early 2013, Kersseboom offered to succeed her but was passed over, reportedly in favour of a new generation. Nevertheless, she continued to appear prominently in news broadcasts. That summer, she served as a guest presenter on Knevel & Van den Brink.

=== Radio ===
On 5 November 2021, NOS announced that Kersseboom would take over as presenter of the NOS Radio 1 Journaal starting in January 2022, succeeding Jurgen van den Berg. She returned to radio after 21 years on television. Her final 8 pm TV broadcast aired on 31 December 2021.
