= Rob Trip =

Dutch journalist and presenter

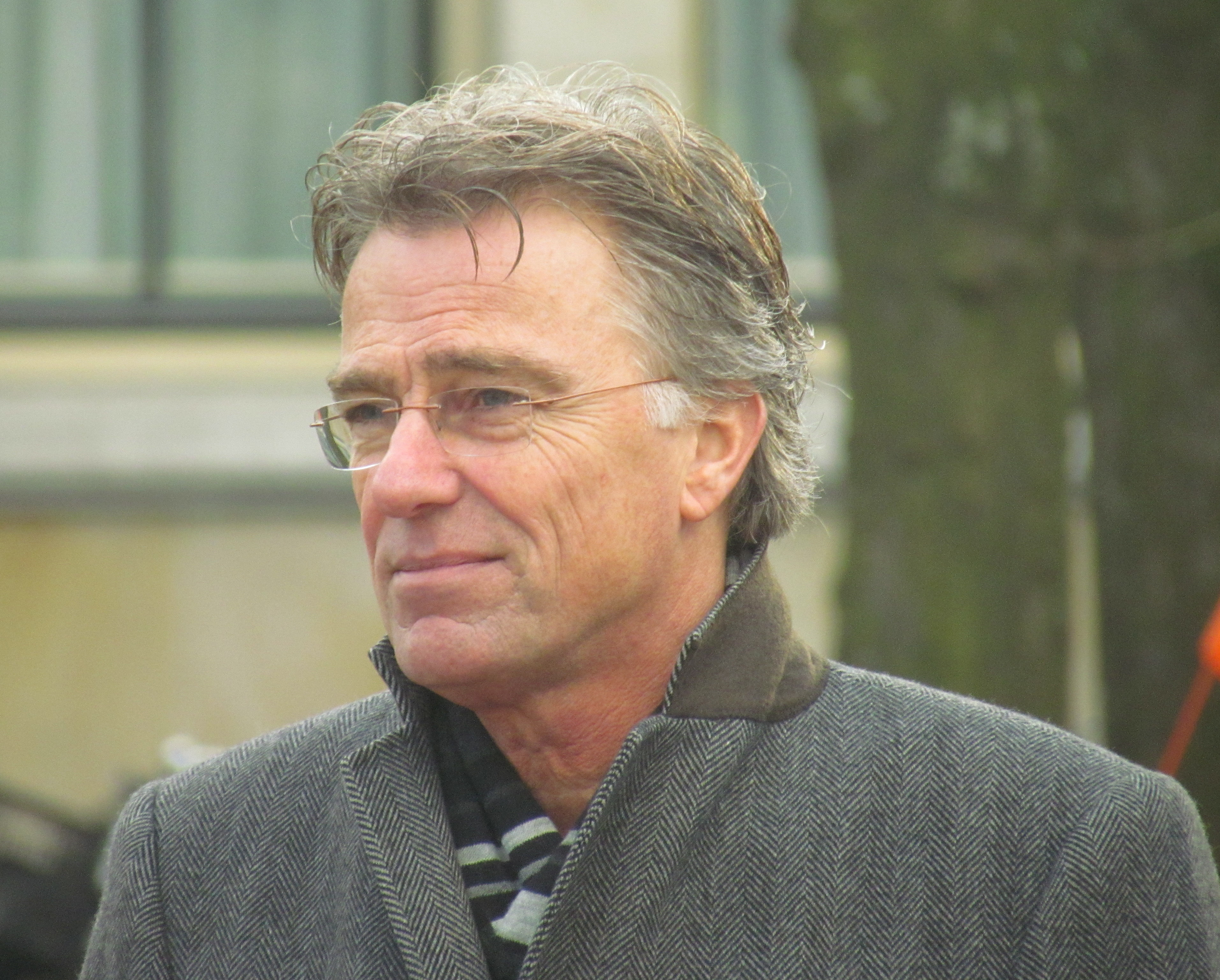
- Rob Trip (2011)
- Born: Rob Trip; 9 March 1960 (age 66); Haarlem, Netherlands
- Occupations: Journalist television presenter radio presenter
- Years active: 1984–present
- Known for: NOS Journaal

Rob Trip (born 9 March 1960) is a Dutch journalist and presenter. Since 2010 he is a news anchor of the eight o'clock news of NOS Journaal, the Dutch public news broadcaster.

== See also ==
- List of news presenters
