= Sacha de Boer =

Dutch photographer and presenter (born 1967)

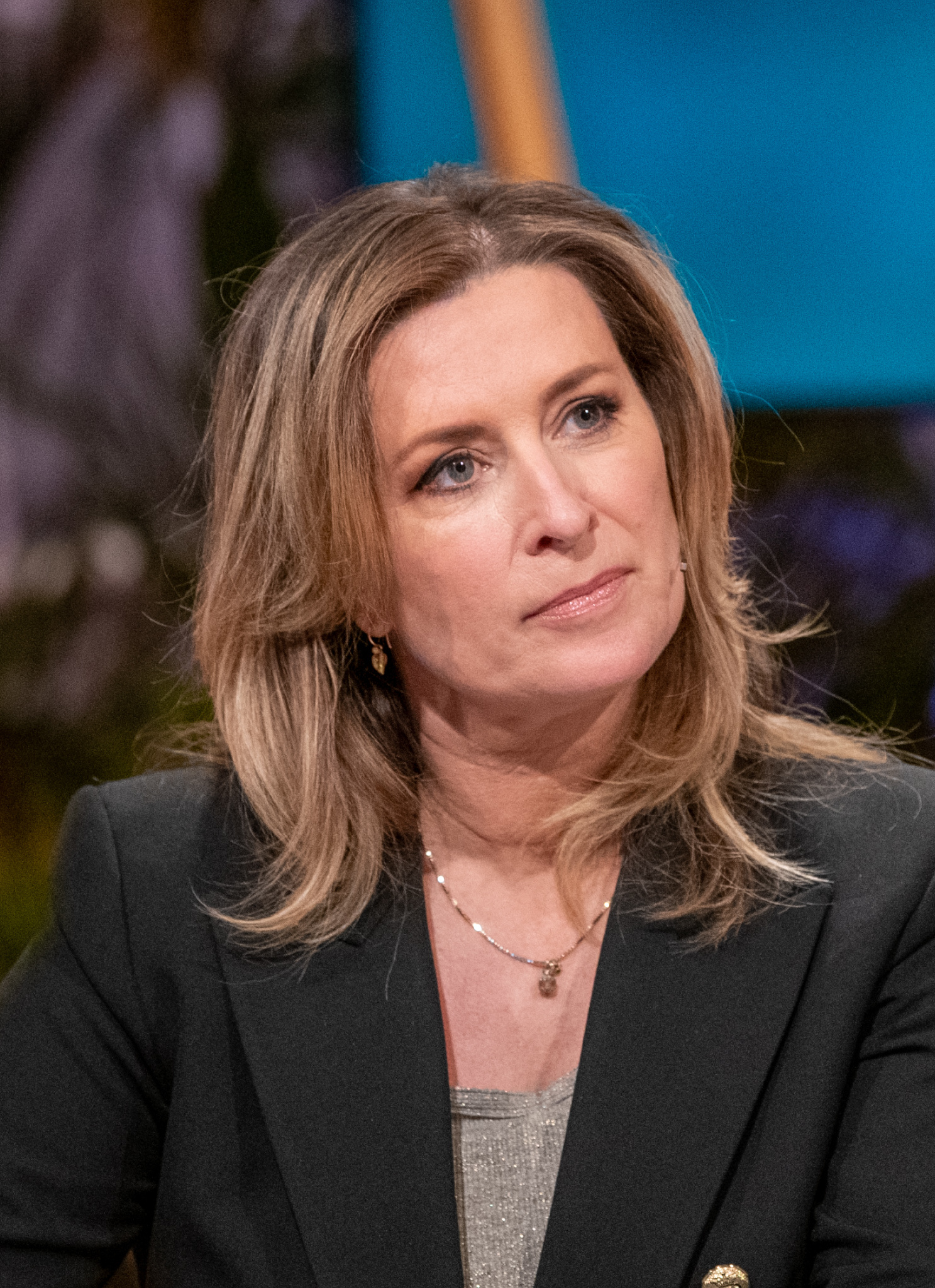
- Sacha de Boer in 2021
- Born: 9 April 1967 (age 58); Amsterdam, Netherlands
- Occupations: Photographer; Television presenter
- Years active: 1994–present
- Spouse: Rick Nieman (m. 2002)
- Website: Official website

Sacha de Boer (born 9 April 1967) is a Dutch photographer, presenter and former journalist. From 1996 to 2013 she was a news presenter of the Dutch public news broadcaster NOS Journaal, acting as the news anchor of the eight o'clock news from 2003 onwards.

== See also ==
- List of Dutch women photographers
- List of news presenters
