= NOS Journaal =

Dutch news broadcast

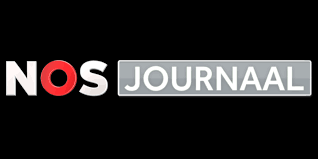
- Logo used from 2012 to 2026
- Genre: News; Current affairs
- Presented by: Various
- Theme music composer: KH Music
- Country of origin: Netherlands
- Original language: Dutch

Production
- Production locations: Media Park, Hilversum
- Camera setup: Multi-camera
- Running time: 20-25 minutes (8 pm edition)
- Production company: Nederlandse Omroep Stichting

Original release
- Network: NPO 1; NPO 2; NPO 3
- Release: 5 January 1956 – present

Related
- NOS Jeugdjournaal; Nieuwsuur

NOS Journaal is the umbrella name for the news broadcasts of the Dutch public broadcaster NOS on radio and television. The division of the NOS responsible for gathering and broadcasting the news is known as NOS Nieuws, and is based at the Media Park in Hilversum; the NOS also has fully equipped radio and television studios in The Hague, from which political programmes are often produced.

== History ==
On 5 January 1956, the Nederlandse Televise Stichting (Dutch Television Foundation, the forerunner of the NOS) broadcast the first NTS-journaal bulletin, created under the influence of Jan-Willem Rengelink. The news were supervised by a special commission. Initially, these were published three times a week. Each edition lasted fifteen minutes and had no presenter. From 3 October 1957, Coen van Hoewijk became the first newsreader of NTS-journaal, and by extension, on Dutch television; the first female newsreader, Eugènie Herlaar, started in 1965. The number of broadcasts increased over time. The Nederlandse Omroep Stichting (Dutch Broadcasting Foundation) was founded in 1969 due to a merger between the NTS and the Nederlandse Radio Union.

On 6 January 1973 at 8 pm, the autocue was introduced; previously, the newsreaders read from scripts printed on paper.

In 1989, NOS Journaal gained competition, in the form of RTL Nieuws, broadcast on the then-upstart channel RTL Véronique. Since then, other media have launched, bringing with them their own news broadcasts, such as SBS6 with its successful Hart van Nederland (Heart of the Netherlands), which focuses on news from within the Netherlands.

Major changes to the presentation of NOS Journaal were made in May 2012: the anchors now presented the news standing up, as opposed to being sat behind a desk, and the news began to be delivered with the help of a large videowall displaying pictures of the day's news. According to the NOS, these changes were made in order to give a greater sense of urgency and to connect more with the viewer.

== Broadcasts ==
=== Evening ===
Evening bulletins are broadcast at 6 pm, 8 pm and midnight on NPO 1 every day; in addition, current affairs programme Nieuwsuur, broadcast nightly at 9.30 pm on NPO 2, also includes a news bulletin, presented by an NOS newsreader.

The 8 pm broadcast is the oldest and considered to be the most important edition of NOS Journaal, typically lasting for 25 minutes; there is more in-depth coverage of the news compared to the 6 pm edition, and there is a comprehensive weather report at the end, presented by a meteorologist.

=== Daytime ===
As of 2018, there are NOS Journaal bulletins every half hour on weekdays between 6:30 am and 9 am on NPO 1, which are simulcast with a sign language interpreter on NPO 2, and hourly bulletins broadcast on NPO 1 or NPO 2 between 9 am and 5 pm. There are fewer bulletins at weekends: on Saturdays, the first bulletin is broadcast at 1 pm, and on Sundays at noon; there is also a short bulletin at 5 pm.

== Studios ==
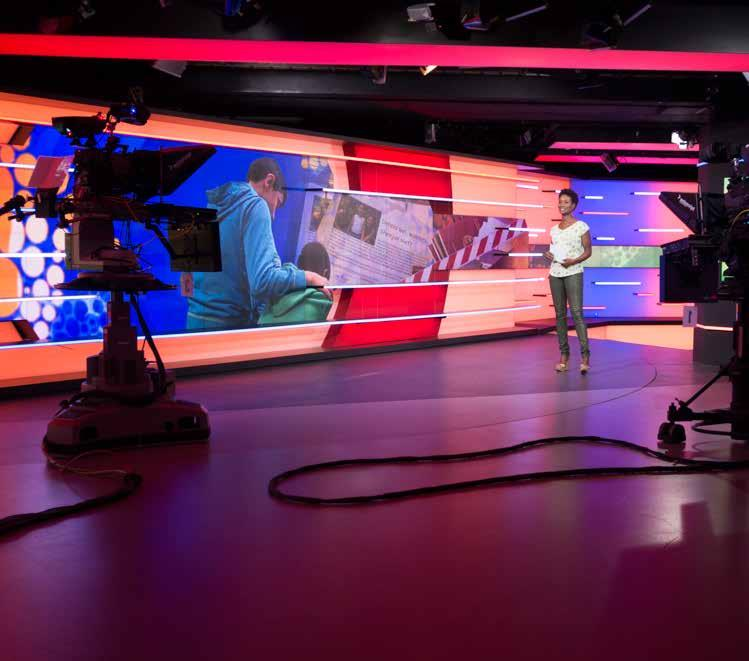
Studio 8 at the Media Park, circa 2012

NOS Journaal is broadcast from studios 8 and 10 at the Media Park, Hilversum. The 6 pm and 8 pm bulletins, along with Nieuwsuur and NOS Jeugdjournaal, are produced in Studio 8, while daytime bulletins come from Studio 10.

== Design and theme music ==
The design of NOS Journaal has changed many times throughout its history. The first title sequence of the NTS-journaal was, at the time. deem controversial, because it showed footage of women wearing short skirts and men dressed in leotards; the NCRV objected and as such, the footage was removed from the intro.

The theme music to NOS Journaal has traditionally featured the sound of a gong; however, this was possibly not the case between 2005 and 2012, when the sound of a cymbal might be used and be artificially remixed to sound like a gong. The theme music used from 1995 to 2001, which was composed by Stephen Emmer, used the same gong as was used in the original theme from 1956. After a long search, the gong was found in the Tropenmuseum in Amsterdam; as there was a small crack in the gong, the gong itself had to be repaired.

On 17 December 2005, the NOS Journaal received a rebrand, which was designed by British design agency Lambie-Nairn. The NOS itself also received a new logo, featuring a red 'O', a motif which featured prominently in the logos, title sequences and sets of all programmes produced by the NOS. The radio news bulletins, previously known as NOS Radio Nieuws, were also renamed to NOS Journaal; as well as the news section on NOS Teletekst. New theme music was also introduced, composed once again by Stephen Emmer.

On 27 May 2012, the corporate identity was revamped again: many elements, such as the use of the colour red, were retained. For the 6 pm and 8 pm bulletins, presenters no longer sat down to present the news, instead standing and walking around the studio, in front of a newly built video wall. New theme music and title sequences were also introduced, with the red 'O' motif becoming a focal point in the title sequences.

== Staff ==
The NOS Journaal primarily employs journalists and editors. Technical staff such as camera operators, visual designers, editors, studio crew, and broadcast engineers are hired externally.

Notable newsreaders from the past include Marga van Arnhem, Gerard Arninkhof, Noraly Beyer, Sacha de Boer, Eef Brouwers, Pia Dijkstra, Fred Emmer, Philip Freriks, Eugènie Herlaar, Rien Huizing, Astrid Kersseboom, Noortje van Oostveen, Harmen Siezen, Henny Stoel, Frits Thors, Gijs Wanders, Maartje van Weegen, Rik van de Westelaken, Herman van der Zandt and Joop van Zijl.

As of 2025, current presenters include Winfried Baijens, Afke Boven, Iris de Graaf, Saïda Maggé, Jeroen Tjepkema, Mark Visser, Simone Weimans, Jeroen Overbeek and Rob Trip. The 8 o'clock news is presented by Trip from Sunday to Friday during even-numbered weeks, and by Annechien Steenhuizen during odd-numbered weeks.

Reporters and correspondents for NOS Journaal include Eva Wiessing, Gerri Eickhof, Youssef Abjij, Charlotte Waaijers, Marieke de Vries, Simone Tukker and Sjoerd den Daas.
