= Pierre Nadeau =

Canadian journalist and television presenter (1936–2019)

Pierre Nadeau OC CQ
- Born: 19 December 1936; Montreal, Quebec, Canada
- Died: 3 September 2019 (aged 82); Montreal, Quebec, Canada
- Resting place: Notre Dame des Neiges Cemetery
- Education: Université de Montréal
- Occupations: Journalist and television presenter
- Known for: Radio-Canada, TVA
- Children: Pascale Nadeau (daughter)
- Awards: Olivar-Asselin Award; Artis Award; Grand Prix Gémeaux; Gemini Awards (6)

Pierre Nadeau OC CQ (French pronunciation: [pjɛʁ nado]; 19 December 1936 – 3 September 2019) was a Canadian journalist, television presenter and producer. He began in journalism as a radio reporter in 1956, inspired by his father's work with Radio-Canada. He interned at the Office de Radiodiffusion Télévision Française where he was mentored by Léon Zitrone and Judith Jasmin, and later served as the Radio-Canada correspondent in Paris. He emulated the free exchange of information on RTL radio in France, which inspired his subsequent presentation style. He worked more than 30 years for Radio-Canada in Montreal as a reporter and host for news programs on current affairs, world events, and politics, and had two tenures as host of the news magazine Le Point.

Nadeau founded his own production company in 1979, produced television series for Radio-Canada and TVA, and his daughter Pascale Nadeau followed in his footsteps as a television host and journalist in Quebec. He won six Gemini Awards for his television work, and his career was recognized with the Olivar-Asselin Award, the Artis Award, and the Grand Prix Gémeaux. He was made a knight of the National Order of Quebec in 1992, retired from journalism in 2008 due to Parkinson's disease, and was named an Officer of the Order of Canada in 2009.

== Early life and education ==
Pierre Nadeau was born in Montreal on 19 December 1936. Nadeau's parents Pauline Migneault and Jean-Marie Nadeau had three sons and raised the family in the Côte-des-Neiges neighbourhood. His father was a locally renowned lawyer and a candidate in the 1950 Quebec Liberal Party leadership elections. His father also gave regular radio commentaries on politics and economics, and the family home was frequented by his colleagues and celebrities of Radio-Canada. As a child, Nadeau became fascinated with the voices on the radio, and used his father's tape recorder to produce his own pretend radio programs. Nadeau completed classical studies at Collège Jean-de-Brébeuf, and graduated from the Université de Montréal with a political science degree.

== Journalism career ==
Nadeau began his career in journalism as a reporter for CJBR-FM in Rimouski in 1956, after a neighbour recommended him for work in radio. Nadeau joined Radio-Canada as an announcer in Montreal in 1957, and co-hosted a daily show on jazz music, and a summertime show on French-Canadian music with Richard Garneau. Nadeau moved to Paris in 1958, to take drama lessons and to complete an internship at the Office de Radiodiffusion Télévision Française. He worked as a freelance reporter for writer Pierre Emmanuel, and was mentored by television journalist Léon Zitrone. Canadian journalist Judith Jasmin who worked as a Radio-Canada correspondent in Paris, gave assignments to Nadeau which included an interview with Canadian cardinal Paul-Émile Léger as Nadeau's first television report. He returned to Montreal after 10 months in Paris.

Nadeau reported for the Radio-Canada Metro-magazine established in 1959, a current affairs program targeted to the Greater Montreal audience. He reported on world events while hosting the television program Camera from 1962 to 1970, was a regular reporter for the daily political magazine Aujourd'hui from 1963 to 1964, and served as the Radio-Canada correspondent in Paris from 1965 to 1968. While in Paris, he frequently listened to RTL radio, the major private station in France. He emulated the station's free exchange of information, which inspired him to establish a new style of current events program called Le monde now, when he returned to Montreal in 1968. Nadeau moderated the Canadian leaders' debates for the 1968 Canadian federal election, and assumed hosting duties of the news magazine Le Point in September 1969.

Nadeau reported on current affairs for the Sunday evening show Weekend on CBC Toronto from 1970 to 1973, and covered the October Crisis in Quebec for an English-Canadian audience. Nadeau continued to cover politics and co-hosted the 1972 Canadian federal election with Bernard Derome, but declined an invitation from René Lévesque to enter politics as a Parti Québécois candidate despite the promise of a ministerial post.

Nadeau hosted the international news magazine Le 60 from 1973 to 1975, and broadcast his interviews with Haitian president Jean-Claude Duvalier and Chilean President Salvador Allende. Other events Nadeau covered were the Vietnam War, the aftermath of the Ikiza in Burundi, the Arab–Israeli conflict, and conflicts in Cyprus. Nadeau was personally shaken when reporting on the 1973 famine in Ethiopia, and his suggestion for viewers to donate to Oxfam led to an inundation of contributions the next day.

Nadeau was a contributor to the Royal Commission on Corporate Concentration begun in 1975. He hosted the news program Télémag from 1977 to 1978, and was a recurring host and reporter for Le Téléjournal. Nadeau departed Radio-Canada in 1979, and joined the broadcast hosts at Radio-Québec and CFGL-FM.

Nadeau founded his own production company later in 1979, named Les Productions du Sagittaire. He hosted the current affairs talk show Les Lundis de Pierre Nadeau from 1979 to 1980, and hosted the interview program Pierre Nadeau encontre from 1982 to 1984. He produced several television series for Radio-Canada during this time, which included the monthly program L'observateur, and returned to hosting Le Point from 1984 to 1989. He produced and hosted several shows and programs for TVA during the early 1990s. His work included Les Grands Procès from 1993 to 1995, a series that reconstructed 20th-century court trials in Quebec which he also narrated. He hosted the programs L'Événement and co-hosted Ferland-Nadeau en direct with Jean-Pierre Ferland. Nadeau also produced the show Nord-Sud, hosted by André Payette.

Nadeau served as the Quebec delegate to Boston from 1994 to 1995, returned to Radio-Canada to host the weekly magazine show Enjeux in 1996, then published his autobiography titled L'impatient in 2001. In the early 2000s, he hosted Pierre Nadeau meets, a series of interviews of prominent Quebec personalities. He announced that he had Parkinson's disease in 2008, and chose to retire from journalism.

== Honours and awards ==
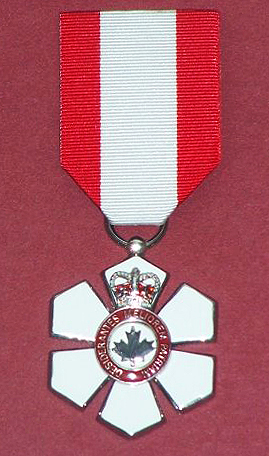
Medal of the Order of Canada

Nadeau received the Meritas Award for the best television reporter in 1964. He was named the "most handsome man in Canada" in 1975, in a contest established by Lise Payette. He was given the Olivar-Asselin Award for journalism by the Saint-Jean-Baptiste Society in 1979, and won the Artis Award in the best news program presenter category in 1988. He was made a made a knight of the National Order of Quebec in 1992.

Nadeau won six Gemini Awards during his career and received the Grand Prix Gémeaux from the Academy of Canadian Cinema & Television in 2001, in recognition of his contributions to French-language television in Canada. He was selected by the Banff World Media Festival in 2002, to its list of the 50 Most Famous People of Canada's First 50 Years of Television. The Professional Federation of Quebec Journalists awarded him the Judith Jasmin Prize for Lifetime Achievement in 2008.

Nadeau was named an Officer of the Order of Canada on 4 November 2009, and was invested on 3 September 2010. He was given the Medal of Honour of the National Assembly of Quebec in 2016.

== Personal life ==
Nadeau married France Johnson in 1957, who was an aspiring actress and later a journalist. They had two children: son Sylvain Nadeau who worked as a lawyer in Paris, and daughter Pascale Nadeau who became a Quebec television journalist. Nadeau separated from his first wife in 1983, then married Clarence Loth, who worked as the vice-president of a public relations firm.

Nadeau died on 3 September 2019, due to complications from Parkinson's disease. His funeral was held at Saint-Viateur d'Outremont Church on 17 September 2019, followed by burial in Notre Dame des Neiges Cemetery in Montreal.
