= Gilles Proulx =

Canadian broadcaster

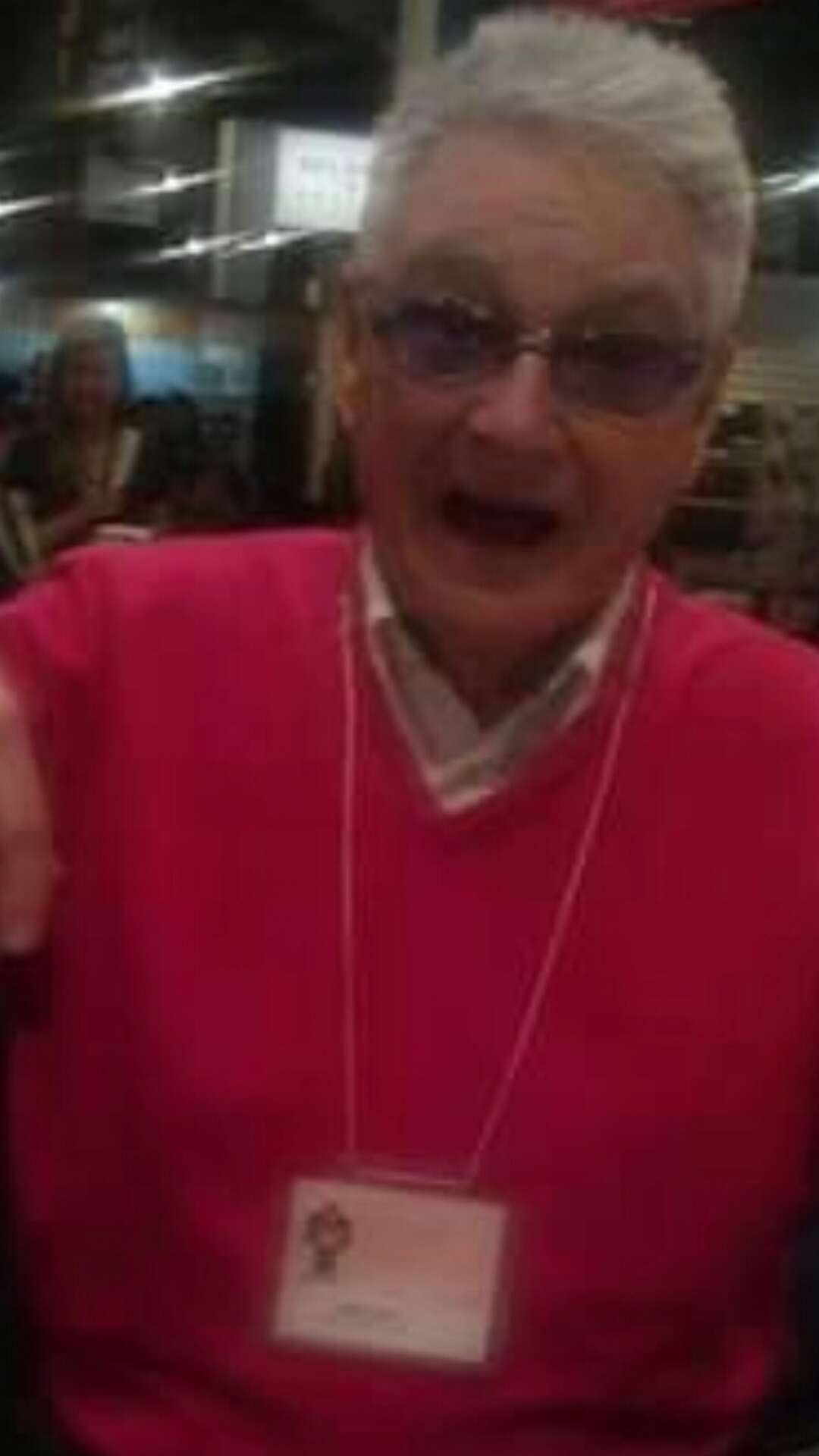
- Born: April 5, 1940 (age 86); Montreal, Quebec, Canada
- Education: UQAM (BC); St Louis University (alleged)
- Occupations: Broadcast journalist, political commentator, cultural critic, historian
- Years active: 1962–present
- Employer(s): Quebecor; Radio Ville-Marie (CIRA-FM)
- Movement: Quebec sovereignty Conservatism

Gilles Proulx (born April 5, 1940) is a Canadian radio and television host in the province of Quebec. His radio career began in 1962, notably working for CHMP-FM and currently for Quebecor and Radio Ville-Marie. A strong Quebec nationalist, known for his conservative views and criticism of the anglophone community, he’s published 153 opinion columns in the Le Journal de Montréal as of 2020.

His brother, Jacques Proulx was the former morning man of another local station CKAC. His niece is Caroline Proulx, minister of Tourism in the current Quebec government.

== Biography ==
Gilles Proulx was born on April 5, 1940, and grew up in the Montreal neighbourhood of Verdun.

Proulx holds a Bachelor's in communications from the Université du Québec à Montréal. He asserted that he earned a Master's in communications from Saint Louis University, in St. Louis, Missouri in 1986. On the January 10, 2007, episode of Les Francs-Tireurs on Télé-Québec he claimed that he did not actually earn the diploma. The show's research team inquired about his claim to the university, who confirmed that Gilles Proulx was not among their alumni.

From 1979 to 1991, he taught a communications course at Université de Montréal, and was a guest lecturer on radio journalism at Université Cheikh Anta Diop in Dakar, Sénégal in 1983.

He was the news director at CKLM, a journalist on the show le Temps de vivre on Radio-Canada, and commentator on CKOI-FM.

After his return from Bosnia and Herzegovina in August 1994, he published a long report on the humanitarian aspect of the Canadian forces in La Presse.

He was best known as the host of Journal du midi, over a span of 24 years. From 1984 to 1994 on CJMS, from 1994 to 2004 on CKAC, and from 2004 to 2008 on CHMP-FM. Gilles Proulx has said that his colourful radio hosting style was inspired by Adrian Cronauer, played by Robin Williams in the film Good Morning, Vietnam.

In 1998 and 1999 he hosted les Grands Dossiers historiques on the Canal D television channel.

Also a photographer and voyager, he has published various books, such as À la conquête du monde in 1996, and Globetrotter in 2000.

On March 15, 2007, while he was undergoing a routine medical examination at the Montreal Heart Institute, doctors determined that a Coronary artery bypass surgery was necessary.

Beginning in late 2009, he hosted a television series known as "Mémoire de Proulx" on Canal VOX in Montreal, which was rebroadcast on other stations across Quebec.

He currently appears as a commentator on TVA and QUB Radio, as well as a columnist for the Journal de Montréal. He also appears on the Catholic and history orientated radio station Radio Ville-Marie.

== Controversy ==
In September 2005, he co-hosted a public affairs show on TQS, known as l'Avocat et le diable. During one episode, he made notable remarks about a victim of a sexual assault, which led to a large amount of criticism in the media accusing him of victim blaming and slut-shaming, and his suspension of the show.

In August 2014, he made alleged antisemitic remarks on a Montreal radio show. According to Proulx, Jews not only attract hatred from other minorities or groups of individuals — resulting in possible persecution — but also control governments with economic power.

In March 2023, he was strongly criticized by the Quebec political class for having made, during a column on Qub Radio, violent and hateful remarks against the Québec solidaire MNAs. Proulx called them "liars", "bastards", "garbage" and "gangrene" and accused them to "whoring". He went further by saying : " […] we should finish them once and for all, these dumbasses". Proulx said this last comment was taken out of its context, while maintaining the insults.

== Awards and honours ==
- He received a Bene Merenti de Patria medal in 1987.
- The Société Saint-Jean-Baptiste awarded him the Olivar-Asselin Award.
- In 1996, he was named an honorary citizen of Morocco.
- In 1997, the Canadian Association of Broadcasters awarded him a Gold Ribbon.
- In 1998, he received the Médaille de la Reconnaissance française, which is awarded by the French Minister of Foreign Affairs, for his devotion to the defense and development of the French language.
- For his promotion of the truth concerning Napoleon Bonaparte, he received a Legion of Merit medal from the International Napoleonic Society.
- On November 22, 2007, Gilles Proulx was named a knight of the Ordre de la Pléiade.

On June 18, 2008, he received the 2008 Édouard-Raymond Fabre Award from the Association of the descendants of the Patriotes of 1837.

== Works ==
- Pour une radio civilisée, Éditions de l’Homme, 1972.
- Pour une radio réformée, Éditions du Jour, 1973.
- La télévision du mépris, Éditions Point de mire, 1975.
- L’aventure de la radio au Québec, Éditions La Presse, 1979.
- La radio d’hier à aujourd’hui, Éditions Libre Expression, 1986.
- Ma petite histoire de la Nouvelle-France, Publications Proteau, 1992.
- À la conquête du monde, Éditions Transcontinental, 1996.
- Les grands détours de notre histoire : Québec-Canada, Éditions Priorités, 1998
- Globetrotter, Éditions du Trécarré, 2000
- Les premiers ministres du Canada et du Québec, Éditions du Trécarré, 2002.
- Visages du monde, Éditions du Trécarré, 2003
- La vie de l’indomptable saint Paul, Éditions Catholiques, 2008.
- Le voyageur qui n'arrive jamais, éditions Michel Brûlé, 2009.
