= Ici RDI =

Canadian French-language cable news channel

ICI RDI
- Country: Canada
- Broadcast area: National
- Headquarters: Montreal, Quebec

Programming
- Picture format: 1080i HDTV (downscaled to letterboxed 480i for the SDTV feed)

Ownership
- Owner: Canadian Broadcasting Corporation
- Sister channels: CBC News Network; Ici Radio-Canada Télé

History
- Launched: January 1, 1995
- Former names: Réseau de l'information (1995-2014)

Links
- Website: ici.radio-canada.ca/rdi (in French)

Availability

Streaming media
- Ici RDI's website: Live video Live audio
- RiverTV: Over-the-top TV

Ici RDI is a Canadian French-language specialty news channel owned by the Canadian Broadcasting Corporation (known in French as Société Radio-Canada). The channel began broadcasting on January 1, 1995, as Réseau de l'information (French pronunciation: [ʁezo də lɛ̃fɔʁmasjɔ̃], Information Network). It is the French-language equivalent of CBC News Network.

== Overview ==
ICI RDI is distributed on basic cable and satellite television to 9.8 million homes, including two million in Quebec, and is seen by half a million English viewers each week. The channel has mandatory carriage status for viewers outside Quebec.

ICI RDI relies on the news-gathering resources of the Canadian Broadcasting Corporation:

- 400 journalists
- Ten newsrooms based in Maison Radio-Canada in Montreal
- 30 bureaus across Canada, and seven foreign bureaus

ICI RDI provides news, business, weather, and sports information on Air Canada's inflight entertainment and is seen in five major Canadian airports as RDI express. Ici RDI was also responsible for continuous news updates on MétroVision screens in the Montreal Metro. This service has been discontinued as of an unknown date.

== Revenue ==
According to the Canadian Communication's Monitoring Report - Broadcasting System 2014, there are 11.1 million subscribers to the channel and a revenue of $54.6 million.

== Programming ==
ICI RDI broadcasts full newscasts at the top of each hour and headlines every half hour from the newsroom of Maison Radio-Canada in Montreal and Quebec City. Le Téléjournal Midi is broadcast each weekday at noon and the main evening news bulletin Le Téléjournal/Le Point every evening live at 9:00 p.m. (eastern). These bulletins are also on the main French-language television network, Ici Radio-Canada Télé. The channel covers major events live from around the world, relying on a staff interpreter for simultaneous translation from English to French whenever necessary. It also rebroadcasts the main supper-hour bulletins from CBVT-DT Quebec City, CBAFT-DT Moncton and CKTV-DT Saguenay.

The channel also broadcasts factual programs in the form of food program L'épicerie, current affairs in Les Grand Reportages (The Big Reports), science in Découverte (Discovery), and Tout le Monde en Parlait - a look back at past culture seen through the eyes of current events. During the weekend there is a greater amount of these programs, much in the same format as its English-language counterpart, the CBC News Network.

=== Current programs ===
- L'info (News) - hosted by Christine Fournier (Weekdays 9:30 a.m.), Alexis De Lancer (Weekdays 1:30 p.m.) and various anchors (Weekends 1:30, 3 and 4 p.m.)
- Le Téléjournal - anchored by Céline Galipeau (Monday-Thursday 9 p.m.) and Pascale Nadeau (Friday-Sunday 9 p.m.)
- Le Téléjournal Midi - anchored by Geneviève Asselin (Daily 12 p.m.)
- RDI Matin - hosted by Marc-André Masson and Martine Defoy (Weekdays 5 a.m.)
- RDI Matin Week-End - hosted by Martin Labrosse (Saturday and Sunday 5:30 a.m.)
- 24/60 (formerly 24 heures en 60 minutes) (24 Hours in 60 minutes) - hosted by Anne-Marie Dussault (Weeknights 7 p.m.)
- Les EX - (The EX's) hosted by Michel Viens (Monday to Thursday 12:30 p.m.)
- La période de questions - (Question period) hosted by Michel Viens (Friday 12:30 p.m.)
- En Direct avec Patrice Roy - hosted by Patrice Roy (Monday to Friday 5 p.m.)
- RDI Économie - hosted by Gérard Fillion (Weeknights 6:30 p.m.)
- Grands reportages (The Big Reports)
- Le National - hosted by Brigitte Bougie and Claudine Bourbonnais (Weeknights 6 and 11 p.m.)

ICI Radio-Canada Télé Productions:

- L'Épicerie - hosted by Denis Gagné and Joane Despins (Saturday 5:30 p.m.)
- Les Coulisses du pouvoir (The corridors of Power) - hosted by Emmanuelle Latraverse (Sunday 11 a.m. and 9:30 p.m.)
- Découverte (Discovery) - hosted by Charles Tisseyre (Sunday 8 p.m.)
- Second Regard (A Second Look) - a religious show hosted by Alain Crevier (Sunday 9:30 p.m.)
- La Facture - a consumer affairs program hosted by Pierre Craig (Sunday 5:30 p.m.)
- La Semaine Verte (The Green Week) - hosted by Catherine Mercier (Sunday 11 p.m.)

=== Current anchors ===
- Geneviève Asselin
- Marie-Josée Bouchard
- Brigitte Bougie
- Claudine Bourbonnais
- Martine Defoy
- Julie Drolet
- Anne-Marie Dussault
- Gérald Fillion
- Christine Fournier
- Céline Galipeau - Le Téléjournal 1^{re} édition (Telejournal First Edition) (evening from Monday to Thursday)
- Martin Labrosse
- Emmanuelle Latraverse
- Marc-André Masson
- Isabelle Richer
- Michel Viens

=== Past programming ===
Former Governor General Michaëlle Jean hosted programs for both the English and French language CBC networks. She presented Grands Reportages on Ici RDI and The Passionate Eye on CBC News Network as well as having her talk show, called Michaëlle. She also served as a substitute anchor on Le Téléjournal.

==== Original hosts ====
- Claude Desbiens, Le Monde ce matin (The World This Morning)
- Nathalie Chung, Aujourd'hui (week-end), Le monde ce soir (week-end)
- Claude Beauchamp, Capital Actions
- Michel Jean, Le Québec en direct (Quebec Live)
- Simon Durivage, Sans Détour
- Pascale Nadeau, Aujourd'hui (Today)
- Christine Fournier, Le Monde ce matin (The World This Morning)
- Pierre Chevrier, L'ouest en direct (The West Live)
- Michaëlle Jean, Le Canada aujourd'hui (Canada Today), Le Monde ce soir (The World This Evening)
- Geneviève Asselin, RDI week-end (RDI Weekend)
- Jean Groulx, L'Ontario en direct (Ontario Live)
- Daniel Poirier, L'Atlantique en direct (The Atlantic Live)
- Odette Gough, RDI en ligne (RDI Online)
- Michelle Vimly, Le Téléjournal 1^{re} édition (The Telejournal First Edition)
- Bernard Derome, Le Téléjournal 1^{re} édition (The Telejournal First Edition)
- Nancy Sabourin, Au travail (Work)

== Slogans and branding ==
In January 2014, RDI changed its on-air brand to Ici RDI as part of a plan to rebrand all of the CBC's French-language outlets under a common brand.

=== Slogans ===
- L'information continue (Continuous information) 1995-?
- Source d'information (Source of information) 2006–2013. Advertised on-screen as analogous to a source of water, a source of energy etc.
- L'info en premier (News first) 2013–2020
- Quoi qu'il arrive (Whatever happens) 2020-2023
- Voyez grand (See big) 2023–present

== High definition ==
As with ICI Radio-Canada Télé, all programming aired on RDI began being produced in widescreen (and letterboxed on all standard definition feeds) on September 10, 2007. On May 2, 2008, RDI launched a high-definition simulcast, RDI HD.

It is available on Bell Satellite TV, Bell Fibe TV, Cogeco, Optik TV, Rogers Cable and Vidéotron.

== Logos ==
1995-era RDI logo from the first broadcast day (screenshot).

Updated version of the original

Modified logo from the previous one, used until May 2, 2008.

Final logo as RDI; 2008-2014

First logo as Ici RDI; 2014-2016

== See also ==
- Ici Radio-Canada Télé
- CBC News Network
- Canadian Broadcasting Corporation
