= Réseau de Résistance du Québécois =

- Other name: RRQ
- Dates active: December 2007-Present
- Active regions: Quebec, Canada
- Ideology: Quebec sovereigntism Quebec nationalism
- Status: Active

The Réseau de Résistance du Québécois (French pronunciation: [ʁezo də ʁezistɑ̃s dy kebekwa], RRQ; English: Québécois Network of Resistance) is a small fringe Quebec nationalist group founded in 2007 that advocates Quebec sovereignty. In 2008, the RRQ claimed a membership of 500 people. The RRQ have released a manifesto, called "Manifeste du Réseau de Résistance du Québécois (RRQ)".

== Protests & campaigns ==
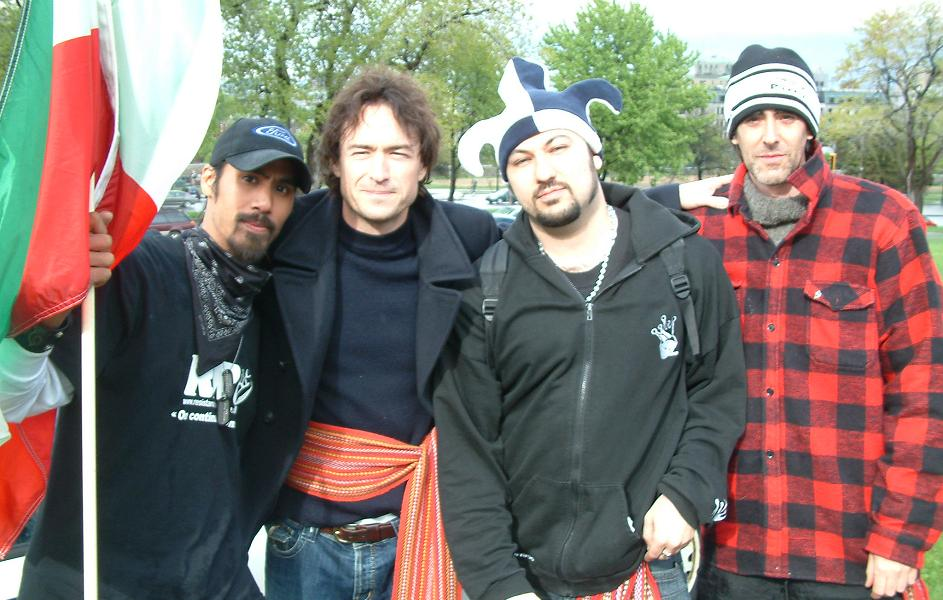
Prominent RRQ member Nick Demers with members of Loco Locass on National Patriots' Day.

In January 2008, the RRQ accused the organizers of Quebec City’s 400th anniversary celebrations of being revisionists.

On March 17, 2008, the RRQ marched at the St. Patrick’s Day parade in Montreal. Members of the RRQ waved Quebec, Patriote and Irish flags. The RRQ also planned to distribute leaflets commemorating links between Irish Canadians and Quebecers, including the involvement of Irish immigrants in the Patriote movement of 1837 in Lower Canada, as Quebec was known at the time. However, both the Mouvement Québec français and the Saint-Jean-Baptiste Society of Montreal, two larger Québec nationalist groups, distanced themselves from the RRQ's march.

In January 2009, the RRQ campaigned against the combat reenactment of the Battle of the Plains of Abraham. Montreal Gazette's Quebec affairs columnist Don Macpherson wrote that the RRQ used propaganda of the deed combined with threats of violence and that played a major role in the cancellation of the reenactment. A spokesperson for the group, retired Quebec filmmaker Pierre Falardeau stated that if the reenactment took place, "some people will get their asses kicked". The RRQ said that for visiting spectators the reenactment would offer "a trip they won't soon forget". Patrick Bourgeois, of the RRQ stated, "The re-enactment is off, that's great. This thing unleashed passions. But ultimately, the responsibility for all of this is the people who concocted this dim-witted plan. Sure, we were promoting civil disobedience. But so were they. The potential for violence was there.”

On June 23, 2009, Lake of Stew, an anglophone music group playing at the L'Autre St. Jean concert for the St. Jean Baptiste festivities at Pelican Park in Rosemont, Quebec, was heckled by members of the RRQ, but the heckling was met mostly with disdain by those in the audience and the band played on to cheers. Guillaume Duchesneau, a member of the RRQ, stated, "I don't think there should be two anglophone bands here. It's the patriotic celebration of Quebec started by a Quebec patriot, Ludger Duvernay in 1834, and it's like an oppression seeing groups sing here in English." He said he noted a virtual absence of any Quebec flags, and said he wondered if a federalist group was organizing the party.

On September 13, 2009, events were held in Quebec to commemorate the anniversary of the Battle of the Plains of Abraham. The RRQ attended the 24-hour reading marathon, called the Moulin à paroles, presenting 140 texts from Quebec artists and historical figures. One reading was the FLQ Manifesto written by the paramilitary organization called the Front de libération du Québec (FLQ). Quebec Premier Jean Charest stated that the reading "trivializes the FLQ, terrorism and violence" (French: Moulin à paroles).

On November 10, 2009, the RRQ blocked the entrance to the Black Watch military armory on Bleury Street in Montreal during a visit from Prince Charles. The crowd of RRQ supporters demonstrated their opposition to the Canadian monarchy.
