= Emmanuelle Latraverse =

Canadian journalist

Emmanuelle Latreverse
- Born: December 30, 1974 (age 51); Montreal, Quebec, Canada
- Education: Carleton University (M.J.); McGill University; Collège Jean-de-Brébeuf
- Occupations: Broadcast journalist, political commentator
- Years active: 2005–present
- Employer(s): Quebecor (2018–present); Radio Canada (2005–2018)

Emmanuelle Latraverse on "La Joute des analystes"

Emmanuelle Latraverse (born December 30, 1974) is a Canadian television journalist, who previously worked for Radio Canada and currently for TVA Nouvelles and the Journal de Montréal.

== Career ==
Covering the Parliament of Canada, she was the first female head of Radio Canada in Ottawa. She was the host of the television political program Les Coulisses du pouvoir ("The Corridors of Power") from September 2011 until the spring of 2017. Subsequent to that, she was lead reporter on Le Téléjournal avec Céline Galipeau, the network's flagship newscast.

During her career as a journalist at Radio Canada, Latraverse appeared regularly on Le Téléjournal Québec from CBVT-DT Quebec City, hosted by Bruno Savard, and as a member of the "in-House panel" on The House from CBC Radio One.

She also her covered the war in Afghanistan, the 2010 Haiti earthquake and then the prime minister of Canada in his travels abroad.

On June 21, 2018, after a series of shuffles in her assignments on the network, Latraverse announced on Twitter that she had resigned from Ici RDI, effective the previous day "to discover new horizons. ... Journalism is one of the most beautiful professions in the world, but it must not become a golden cage". On August 30 that year, La Presse reported that Latraverse had been accused of psychological harassment, verbal aggression, intimidation, over several years during her years as head of the Radio Canada office in Ottawa.

Since 2018, she has been employed by Quebecor as a political commentator on TVA Nouvelles, as well as a columnist for the Journal de Montréal.

== Personal life ==
Latraverse attended high school at Villa Sainte Marcelline in Westmount and took post-secondary studies at the Collège Jean-de-Brébeuf in Montréal. She holds a degree in modern German Studies and in Economics from McGill University, and a Master's in journalism from Carleton University.
