= Pascale Nadeau =

Canadian news presenter

- Born: 2 April 1960 (age 66)
- Occupation: News presenter
- Notable credit(s): Réseau de l'information Le Téléjournal weekend anchor (2008–present)
- Father: Pierre Nadeau

Pascale Nadeau (French pronunciation: [paskal nado]; born 2 April 1960) is a Canadian news presenter for Télévision de Radio-Canada from Quebec. Previously a daytime presenter for the all-news network Réseau de l'information and a local presenter for CBFT in Montreal, she was the weekend presenter of the network's flagship newscast Le Téléjournal from September 2008 to 2021.

She succeeded Céline Galipeau, who became the program's main weekday presenter following the retirement of Bernard Derome.

== Biography ==
Nadeau is the daughter of the television journalist Pierre Nadeau; and the goddaughter of Peter Jennings, She studied special needs education at university, but left the field after a year and began working as a journalist for news radio station CKAC in Montreal. She subsequently moved to TQS and later to TV5, before joining Radio-Canada in 1996. Nadeau has two children, named Alexandra and Julien.
