= Bene merenti de patria =

Bene merenti de patria is a silver medal created in 1923. It is awarded by the Quebec patriotic Saint-Jean-Baptiste Society to a "compatriot having rendered exceptional services to the homeland".

== Laureates ==
- 1924: Marie Lacoste Gérin-Lajoie
- 1924: Laurent-Olivier David
- 1964: Sister Marie-Stéphane
- 1964: Wilfrid Laurier
- 1965: Claude Champagne
- 1965: Lionel Daunais
- 1965: Madame Aline Hector Perrier
- 1966: Annette Lasalle-Leduc
- 1966: Jean Vallerand
- 1966: Eugène Lapierre
- 1968: Dr. Pierre Grondin
- 1970: Clermont Pépin
- 1972: Dr. Armand Frappier
- 1974: Gustave Bellefleur
- 1975: Father Gustave Lamarche
- 1977: Raymond Barbeau
- 1977: Jean-Charles Bonenfant (posthumous)
- 1982: Séraphin Marion
- 1982: Jean Rougeau (known as Johnny Rougeau)
- 1983: Jeannine Séguin
- 1987: Gilles Proulx
- 1989: Pierre-Louis Mallen (first non-Quebecer)
- 1990: Alice Poznanska-Parizeau (posthumous)
- 1991: Mary Travers (known as La Bolduc, posthumous)
- 1992: Dollard Ménard and Eugenia Dias
- 1997: Rosaire Morin
- 2005: Raymond Lévesque
- 2011: Réginald Chartrand
- 2012: Marcel Masse
- 2015: Gilles Rhéaume
- 2019: Yvon Groulx
- 2019: Yves Saint-Denis
- 2021: Yves Michaud
- 2023: Onil Perrier

== See also ==
- Quebec nationalism
