= Le Mount Stephen =

Hotel in Montreal, Quebec

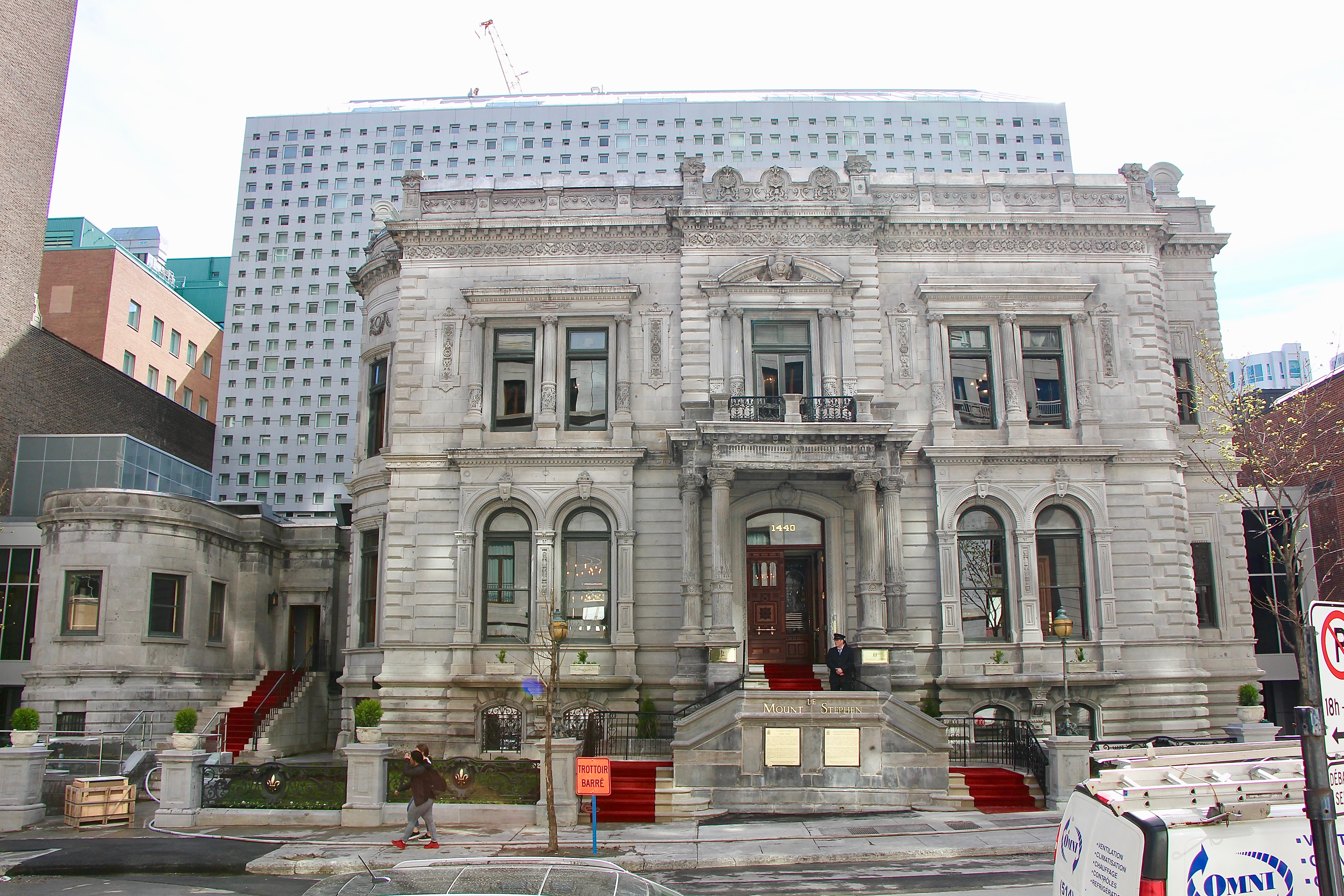
- Le Mount Stephen Hotel in 2017

- Location within Montreal

General information
- Location: 1430-1440, Drummond Street; Montreal, Quebec; H3G 1V9
- Coordinates: 45°29′56″N 73°34′33″W
- Opened: 1 May 2017
- Cost: C$25 million

Design and construction
- Architect: Lemay / Leclerc Architects

Other information
- Number of rooms: 69
- Number of suites: 16
- Number of restaurants: 1
- Number of bars: 1
- Parking: Yes

Website
- www.lemountstephen.com

Le Mount Stephen is a luxury hotel located partly in the former George Stephen House in the Golden Square Mile of the Ville-Marie borough of Montreal, Quebec, Canada.

At its opening, the hotel featured 69 rooms, 16 suites, 4 lofts, and 1 suite of approximately 465 square meters, as well as shops, a restaurant, and 96 indoor parking spaces. Originally scheduled to open in June 2015, the hotel finally opened on May 1, 2017. It is a member of The Leading Hotels of the World consortium.

== Site ==
The hotel "Le Mount Stephen" is located at 1430-1440 Drummond Street in the Golden Square Mile of the Ville-Marie borough of Montreal. It is approximately 2.7 km from Old Montreal. The hotel is served by the Peel metro station on the Green Line and by bus route "15 Sainte-Catherine".

== History ==
Summary of construction stages
Year	Construction stages	Architects	Builders
2012-2017	Construction of a contemporary hotel at the rear, comprising 80 rooms, shops, and an underground parking garage with approximately 96 spaces.	Lemay / Leclerc Architects (Architects : Michel Lauzon, Gino Mauri, Didier Heckel, Sandra Neill, Jean-François St-Onge, Bryan Marchand, Jean-François Fortin-Gadoury, Virginie Pontbriand, Damien Leman, Geneviève Telmosse, François Desmarais)	Construction Tidan (Builder), Nicolet, Chartrand, Knoll Ltd. (Structure), Pageau Morel et associés inc. (Mecanic/Electric), Technorm (Building Security), Lemay (Interior Design)

Inauguration of hotel Le Mount Stephen on May 1, 2017.

In 2012, a luxury hotel project, "Le Mount Stephen" Hotel, began to take shape, partially occupying the former George Stephen House, designed by William Tutin Thomas. This project required the construction of a contemporary addition at the rear, costing $25 million. Designed by the firm Lemay/Leclerc Architectes, this new eleven-story addition was originally planned to include approximately 80 guest rooms, reception and meeting rooms, a spa, a jacuzzi, a sauna, a massage and fitness room, a restaurant, shops, and an underground parking garage with approximately 90 spaces. That same year, the architectural firm received an award of excellence from the Canadian Architect Awards of Excellence for the design of the Mount Stephen Hotel building.

Construction of this hotel began in 2012 with the demolition of the west and north wings and continued until April 2017. Its opening, originally scheduled for June 2015, took place on May 1, 2017. On this occasion, the hotel notably inaugurated the George Bar, a restaurant and bar seating two hundred guests, part of the Toronto-based Oliver & Bonacini group.

In August 2017, Roger Federer was interviewed by Peter de Jonge of The New York Times at the George Bar in a "small room adjoining the lobby" of the George Stephen House. Furthermore, in September 2017, the business daily Les Affaires revealed that the hotel "had already welcomed its first international stars, including some extremely wealthy princes from the Arab world."

On March 27, 2018, Le Mount Stephen Hotel hosted Prime Minister Justin Trudeau at a fundraising event organized by the Liberal Party of Canada.

On September 19, 2024, Le Mount Stephen Hotel was awarded one key from the Michelin Guide.

== The hotel ==
Upon its opening, the Mount Stephen Hotel featured 69 rooms, 16 suites, 4 lofts, and 1 suite of approximately 465 square meters, as well as shops, a restaurant (Bar George), and an indoor parking garage with 96 spaces. The hotel also included two reception rooms (the "Elizabeth" room of approximately 465 square meters and another room of approximately 167 square meters), a gym, and a spa called "Spa Prestige Mbiospa." From its opening, the hotel was a member of The Leading Hotels of the World consortium.

Bar George, a restaurant owned by the Oliver & Bonacini group, has been run by chefs Anthony Walsh and Kevin Ramasawny since 2017, who offer "a menu of British culinary classics." The restaurant's interior design was created by Metaphor Design. This restaurant can accommodate up to 200 people.

== Sources ==
=== Newspaper Articles ===
List of newspaper articles in chronological order of publication:

- "Fin des travaux. Hôtel Le Mount Stephen". Montréal Info (Newspaper) (in French). Montreal, Canada. March 23, 2017.
- Tim Forster (April 18, 2017). "Bar George Preps For May Opening in New Mount Stephen Hotel. Bar George Preps For May Opening in New Mount Stephen Hotel". Eater Montreal (Magazine). Montreal, Canada.
- Nathaëlle Morissette (April 29, 2017). "L'Hôtel Mount Stephen enfin prêt à accueillir des clients". La Presse (Newspaper) (in French). Montreal, Canada.
- "Opulent and historic Mount Stephen Club reopens as luxury hotel". CTV News (Newspaper). Montreal, Canada. May 1, 2017.
- Andréanne Chevalier (May 1, 2017). "L'hôtel Mount Stephen ouvre ses portes". Métro Montréal (Newspaper) (in French). Montreal, Canada.
- "Un riche héritage qui renaît sous un nouveau jour. Le Mount Stephen fait honneur à Montréal". Le Lézard (Newspaper) (in French). Montreal, Canada. May 1, 2017.
- Vanessa de Montigny (May 2, 2017). "Un nouveau restaurant ouvre ses portes dans un manoir datant de 1880". Le Journal de Montréal (Newspaper) (in French). Montreal, Canada.
- Peter de Jonge (August 24, 2017). "How Roger Federer Upgraded His Gam". New York Times (Newspaper). New York (NY), US.
- Arianne Krol (June 30, 2017). "Bar George: un autre exotisme". La Presse (Newspaper) (in French). Montreal, Canada.
- Claudine Hébert (September 9, 2017). "Un paysage hôtelier montréalais revivifié". Les Affaires (Newspaper) (in French). Montreal, Canada.
- Marco Vigliotti (March 27, 2018). "Politics This Morning: Joly, Trudeau to unveil action plan for official languages; Petitpas Taylor, Blair to appear before Senate committee; Sajjan visits United Nations". The Hill Times (Newspaper).
- Èves Dumas (September 19, 2024). "Des clefs Michelin pour nos hôtels". La presse (Newspaper) (in French). Montreal, Canada.

=== Websites ===
- Tim Forster (April 18, 2017). "Bar George Preps For May Opening in New Mount Stephen Hotel". Eater Montreal. Montreal (QC), Canada.: Eater Montreal.
- "Mount Stephen Club. Lemay (LemayLab)". Canadian Architect Awards of Excellence. Canada: Canadian Architect Awards of Excellence.
- "Hôtel Mount Stephen". Le Mount Stephen. Montreal (QC), Canada: Groupe hôtelier et immobilier Tidan.
- "Mount Stephen Club and Hotel Complex, Montreal, Quebec, Canada" (PDF). Lemay / Leclerc Architectes. Montreal (QC), Canada: Lemay / Leclerc Architectes.
