= Andréanne Lafond =

Canadian journalist

Andréanne Lafond

Andréanne Lafond (1919 (some sources say 1920) – January 29, 2012) was a Canadian journalist living and working in Quebec, best known as a host for Radio-Canada television.

She was born in Lyon and came to Quebec in 1948. She worked as script assistant for several Quebec films, including The Village Priest (Le Curé de village), Little Aurore's Tragedy (La Petite Aurore, l'enfant martyre), Séraphin and The Nightingale and the Bells (Le Rossignol et les cloches). She joined Radio-Canada, where she worked closely with Judith Jasmin and René Lévesque and appeared on a number of public affairs programs such as Carrefour, Aujourd'hui, Format 30, Format 60 and Actualité 24. She was also host for the literary magazine Le trèfle à quatre feuilles. With Solange Chaput-Rolland, she founded and directed the magazine Points de vue which appeared from 1955 to 1961. From 1976 to 1983, she was co-host of the radio program La vie quotidienne. Lafond was among the pioneers who expanded the representation of women in journalism in the 1950s.

She also wrote a number of scripts for stories and dramas presented on radio and television.

Lafond received the Prix des communications du Québec in 1983 and the Olivar-Asselin Award in 1989.

She died in Montreal at the age of 92.
