= The House (radio program) =

Canadian current affairs show

- Genre: politics, current affairs
- Running time: 60 minutes
- Country of origin: Canada
- Language: English
- Home station: CBO-FM
- Hosted by: Catherine Cullen
- Produced by: Jennifer Chevalier
- Original release: October 22, 1977 – present
- Website: http://www.cbc.ca/thehouse/

The House is a Canadian national politics and current affairs radio program, airing nationally on Saturday mornings on CBC Radio One with repeat broadcasts Saturday nights. The show's contents and format are similar to a television Sunday morning talk show. It is produced from the studios of CBO-FM at the CBC Ottawa Broadcast Centre in Ottawa, Ontario.

The program's current host is Catherine Cullen.

== History ==
The program debuted on October 22, 1977, soon after the rules of the House of Commons of Canada were changed to permit radio and television broadcasts of the chamber's proceedings. The program's original concept was to simply record and air House debates, although the producers soon decided to add interview and journalism segments to broaden the program's scope and appeal.

In late 2001 and early 2002, during the same repositioning process that ultimately saw the network's weekday morning program This Morning replaced with The Current and Sounds Like Canada, media began to report that The House was also slated for cancellation. The CBC acknowledged that the show's future was under consideration, but denied that any decision to cancel it had already been made. When the CBC formally announced its new programming lineup in May 2002, The House remained on the schedule.

== Content ==
The content is focused on interviews with Canadian politicians, advocates, and commentators, with infrequent radio documentaries and a weekly "in-House panel" discussion featuring a rotating roster of CBC and external political journalists including Terry Milewski, Rosemary Barton, Ici RDI's Emmanuelle Latraverse, Joël-Denis Bellavance of La Presse, and pundit Tasha Kheiriddin. In the late 2000s, it also featured a segment called "That's a Good Question," in which Kady O'Malley answered listener questions about political processes.

Apart from the serious current affairs pieces, the show has also aired some complementary entertainment features. These have included "Beat the House," where listeners are challenged to guess the identity of the mystery guest who was a notable figure in recent Canadian political news who gives a series of clues, and "A Little Housecleaning," which features political satirical humour. The Christmas episode is reserved for an annual holiday House Quiz, a game show-format political trivia competition featuring a panel of CBC journalists as competitors, each equipped with a different humorous noisemaker used to claim precedence in answering questions posed by the host about news stories from throughout the year.

The digital archive on the CBC's website includes selected segments from the program dating as far back as 1978.

== Hosts ==
The program's original host was Marguerite McDonald. Since then, it has been hosted by Stephen Boissonneault, Denise Rudnicki, Judy Morrison (1980s), Jason Moscovitz (1990s), Anthony Germain (2001–2006), Kathleen Petty (2006–2011) and Evan Solomon (2011–2015).

After Solomon's dismissal from the CBC in June 2015, Rosemary Barton hosted the first episode, while parliamentary reporter Chris Hall hosted thereafter.

Hall retired from the CBC in June 2022.

On August 17, 2022, it was announced that Catherine Cullen will be the new permanent host.
