= Claude Beauchamp =

Canadian journalist (1939–2020)

Claude Beauchamp (July 9, 1939 – April 12, 2020) was a journalist, publisher, and political activist in the Canadian province of Quebec. He was born in Montreal.

== Journalist and publisher ==
Beauchamp began his career as a financial writer for La Presse and served as assistant publisher and editor-in-chief of Le Soleil in the late 1970s. He became president and general manager of Publications Les Affaires Inc. in 1980, one year after the company purchased the business journal Les Affaires. Beauchamp relaunched the journal as a tabloid and later oversaw the company's purchase of smaller, niche-oriented papers such as Quebec Construction, Revue Commerce, Quebec Yachting, VeliMag, Voile Libre, Ski Quebec, and Sports Marketing Canada. Corporate revenues rose under Beauchamp's leadership from less than $1 million in 1980 to $13 million in 1985. He remarked on his success in November 1985, "The market was there for years, but nobody was serving it."

Beauchamp was awarded the Saint-Jean-Baptiste Society's Olivar-Asselin Award for excellence in journalism in 1984. Two years later, he presided over a Montreal economic summit called by mayor Jean Drapeau. Between 1987 and 1990, he launched English-language papers entitled This Week in Business and Good Times, The Magazine for Successful Retirement, and oversaw the purchase of a French-language seniors' weekly called Le temps de vivre. He resigned as president of Publications Les Affaires Inc. in 1990.

In late 1990, Beauchamp was named as co-chair of a "rescue brigade" set up by the Quebec government via the Société de developpement industrielle du Québec to provide assistance for Quebec companies threatened by the financial downturn of the early 1990s. Beauchamp described the program as an "extraordinary success" in June 1991, saying that it had overseen loans to 158 companies.

Beauchamp began hosting the financial issues program "Capital Action" on the Réseau de l'information television network in 1995. He resigned from this position in 2004.

== Political activist ==
In September 1991, Beauchamp became president of the newly formed Regroupement économie et constitution (Group for the Economy and the Constitution), an alliance of business leaders whose purpose was to promote private sector growth in a framework of renewed Canadian federalism. Beauchamp said the group would promote federalism in Quebec while also explaining Quebec's needs to the rest of Canada. He added that, in the view of his organization, "the fundamental problems of Quebec and Canada are first of all economic, not political or constitutional," and that sustained financial growth would be impossible in an unstable political climate. In December 1991, he proposed the creation of a "Council of Federation" with mixed federal and provincial representation, to oversee a new Canadian economic union.

Beauchamp participated in several forums on reforming the Canadian Constitution in 1992. On one occasion, he tried to break an impasse in negotiations on Senate reform by proposing that all provinces have an equal number of senators, with those from larger provinces having more heavily weighted votes. Beauchamp acknowledged that this proposal was "not perfect" but added that he did not want to see the entire constitutional reform package fall apart due to disagreements on this issue from various parties.

Beauchamp ultimately supported and campaigned for the Charlottetown Accord, a constitutional reform package introduced in August 1992 by the Canadian federal government of Brian Mulroney. During the 1992 referendum campaign on the accord, he argued that between 30,000 and 50,000 jobs could be lost in Quebec if the accord was defeated. The accord was ultimately defeated, both in Quebec and across Canada as a whole.

After the accord's demise, Beauchamp recommended that both the Canadian and Quebec governments embark on a major public works program, building highways and a high-speed rail connection from Quebec City to Windsor, Ontario.

== Montreal municipal politics ==
In June 1992, several leading figures in the opposition Civic Party of Montreal (CPM) urged Beauchamp to become their party's candidate for mayor in the 1994 municipal election. He declined the offer, saying that he was too busy with talks on the constitution.

Beauchamp announced in November 1993 that he would run for mayor of Montreal, not as a Civic Party candidate but as the leader of his own political movement. Supported by incumbent councillor Nick Auf der Maur and former Civic Party leader Claude Dupras, he cast himself as a reformer who could change the culture of city hall, fix the economy, and create jobs. He formally launched the Action Montreal party in February 1994, pledging to "modernize" city hall, reduce the number of civil servants, and turn some municipal services over to the private sector. After the party's creation, Beauchamp received support from incumbent councillors Gérard Legault and Vittorio Capparelli, both formerly of the Montreal Citizens' Movement (MCM).

Some of Beauchamp's opponents criticized his focus on business issues, charging that he was little more than a representative of the city's business lobby. After a Le Devoir poll put him in fourth place, he withdrew from the contest in April 1994 to support Vision Montreal candidate Pierre Bourque.

== Death ==
Beauchamp died on April 12, 2020, of unspecified causes, days after contracting COVID-19 and years after developing a chronic illness during the pandemic in Montreal.
