= Les Coulisses du pouvoir =

Canadian television news series

- Presented by: Daniel Lessard ( -2011); Emmanuelle Latraverse (2011-2017); Daniel Thibeault (2017-present)
- Country of origin: Canada

Production
- Production locations: CBC Ottawa Production Centre; Ottawa, Ontario
- Running time: 60 minutes

Original release
- Network: Ici Radio-Canada Télé; Ici RDI

Les Coulisses du pouvoir ("The Corridors of Power") is a Canadian television news series, which airs on Ici Radio-Canada Télé and Ici RDI. Hosted by Daniel Thibeault, the series covers Canadian politics in a Sunday morning talk show format, including both interviews with political figures and panel discussions concerning the National Assembly of Quebec and the House of Commons of Canada.

Regular panelists on the series include journalists Alec Castonguay, Michel C. Auger and Chantal Hébert.

The program was previously hosted by Daniel Lessard prior to 2011, and by Emmanuelle Latraverse from 2011 to 2017.
