= Simon Durivage =

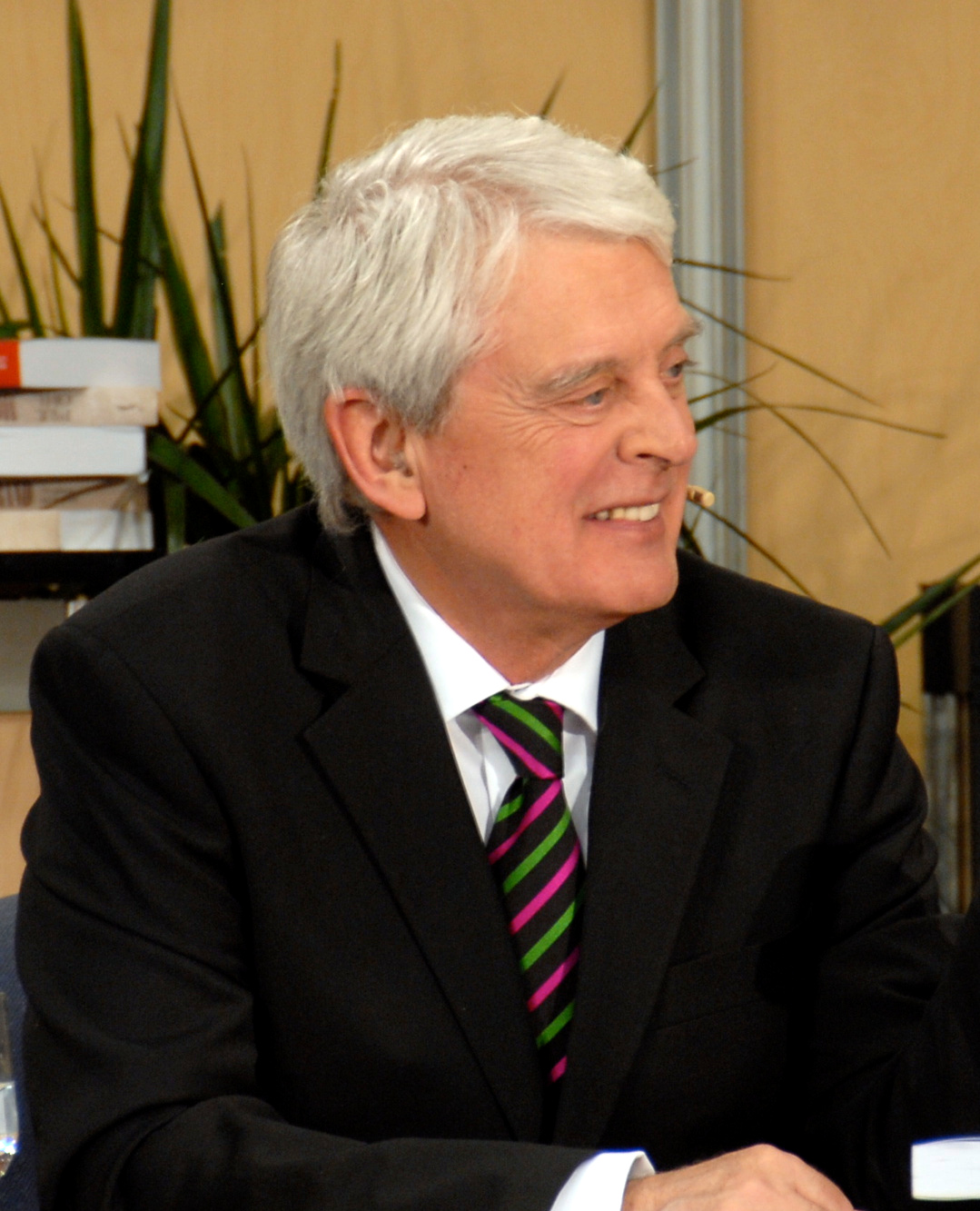
Simon Durivage, hosting Le club des ex in 2010

Simon Durivage CM (French pronunciation: [simɔ̃ dyʁivaʒ]; born December 10, 1944, in Montreal, Quebec) is a Canadian French language television news anchor for RDI en direct. He was recruited by Radio-Canada in 1969 and has since hosted several newscasts and public affairs programs: Consommateurs avertis, Enjeux, Le Point, Montréal-Express, Montréal ce soir and Rédacteur en chef.

Having spent part of his career at network TVA, he anchored the 10 p.m. newscast of this network for several years. In 2002, he left TVA for Radio-Canada, allowing Sophie Thibault to take his place. From 2004 to 2006, he hosted simondurivage.com. Since 2006, he hosts RDI en direct on Quebec-based 24-hour news-channel RDI, where he also hosts Le club des ex, a forum where former politicians comment news items.

On June 19, 2015, Simon Durivage announced that he was leaving Radio-Canada.

His voice is heard on the telephone by dialling +1 613 745 9426 and was formerly used by the CHU shortwave radio time service of the National Research Council of Canada (NRC/CNRC), announcing the time in French.
