= Roland Berthiaume =

Canadian caricaturist (1927–2021)

- Born: 12 December 1927; Montreal, Quebec, Canada
- Died: 8 February 2021 (aged 93); Montreal, Quebec, Canada
- Other names: Berthio
- Occupation: Caricaturist

Roland Berthiaume (12 December 1927 – 8 February 2021) was a Canadian caricaturist. He was also known under the pseudonym Berthio.

== Biography ==
From the 1950s to the 1990s, Berthiaume created caricatures for the newspapers La Presse, Le Devoir, and Le Soleil. He also worked for the magazines L'actualité and Croc. In 1973, he won the Olivar-Asselin Award for his contributions to journalism. Today, his archives can be found at the Bibliothèque et Archives nationales du Québec in Montreal.

Roland Berthiaume died on 8 February 2021 at the age of 93.

== Publications ==
- Un monde fou : les 150 meilleures caricatures de Berthio (1961)
- Les cent dessins du Centenaire (1967)
- Pierre, Jean, René, Claude et les autres (1980)
- Faces à farces (1981)
