= Saint-Jean-Baptiste Day =

Holiday celebrated on June 24

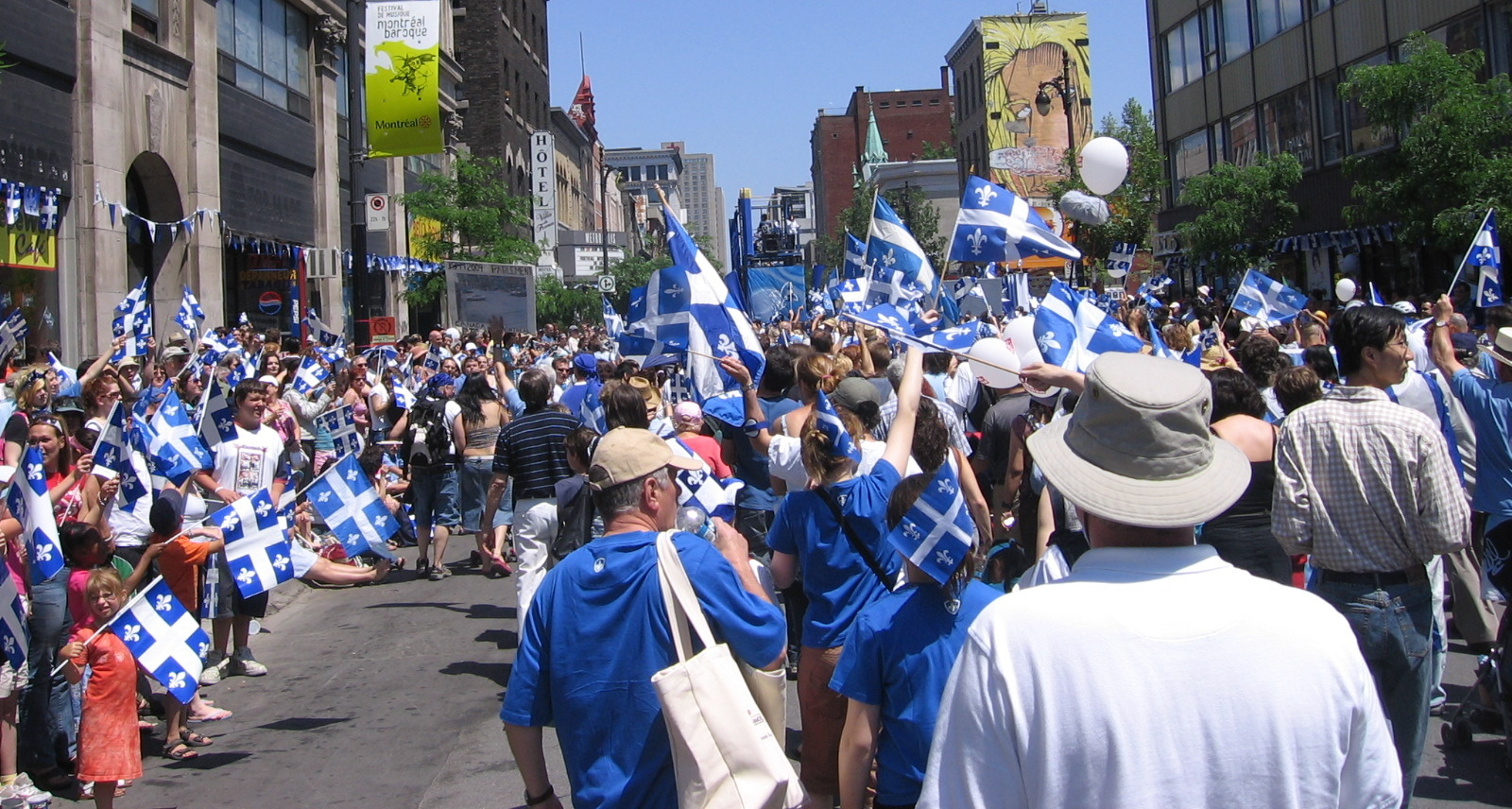
- Saint-Jean-Baptiste parade, Montreal, June 24, 2006
- Also called: Fête de la Saint-Jean-Baptiste, St John the Baptist Day, La Saint-Jean, Fête nationale, National Holiday
- Observed by: Quebecers, French Canadians, French Americans/French Canadian Americans
- Type: Historical, cultural, national, religious
- Celebrations: Parades, bonfires, fireworks, feasting, drinking, musical concerts, flag waving, patriotic speeches, contests
- Date: June 24
- Next time: June 24, 2027
- Frequency: Annual

Saint-Jean-Baptiste Day (French: Fête de la Saint-Jean-Baptiste, la Saint-Jean, Fête nationale du Québec), also known in English as St John the Baptist Day, is a holiday celebrated on June 24 in the Canadian province of Quebec. It was brought to Canada by French settlers celebrating the traditional feast day of the Nativity of Saint John the Baptist. It was declared a public holiday in Quebec in 1925, with publicly financed events organized province-wide by a Comité organisateur de la fête nationale du Québec.

== Origins ==
The feast day of Saint John the Baptist or Midsummer was a very popular event in the Ancien Régime of France, and it is still celebrated as a religious feast day in several countries, including Denmark, Norway, Sweden, Finland, Estonia, Spain, Latvia, Ireland and Lithuania.

The tradition landed in Canada with the first French colonists. The first mention of celebrations of Saint John the Baptist in North America dates back to 1606, when settlers en route to the future Acadia rested on the coast of Newfoundland, June 23. The second mention of celebrations, according to The Jesuit Relations, occurred on the banks of the Saint Lawrence River on the evening of June 23, 1636, with a bonfire and five cannon shots.

The green, white and red tricolour used by the Parti patriote between 1832 and 1838

In Lower Canada, the celebration of the nativity of St. John the Baptist took a patriotic tone in 1834 on the initiative of one of the founders of the newspaper La Minerve, Ludger Duvernay, who later became the first president of the Saint-Jean-Baptiste Society. In the spring of 1834, Duvernay and other patriotes attended the celebrations of the first St. Patrick's Day, the celebration of the Irish diaspora, in Montreal. This gave him and others the idea of organizing something similar for the Canadiens and their friends.

On that June 24, George-Étienne Cartier's "Ô Canada! mon pays, mes amours" was first sung during a grand patriotic banquet gathering about sixty francophones and anglophones of Montreal, in the gardens of lawyer John McDonnell, near the old Windsor Station. The Canada in the song refers to Lower Canada, today's southern Quebec. Rounds of toasts went to the Parti patriote, the United States, Ireland, and the Ninety-Two Resolutions.

Two days later, La Minerve concluded: "This holiday, whose goal is to solidify the union of the Canadiens, will not go without bearing fruit. It will be celebrated annually as a national holiday and will not miss producing the happiest results." The celebration recurred in 1835, 1836, 1837.

Following the defeat of the insurrectional movement during the Lower Canada Rebellion and the military repressions which followed, the day was not celebrated for several years.

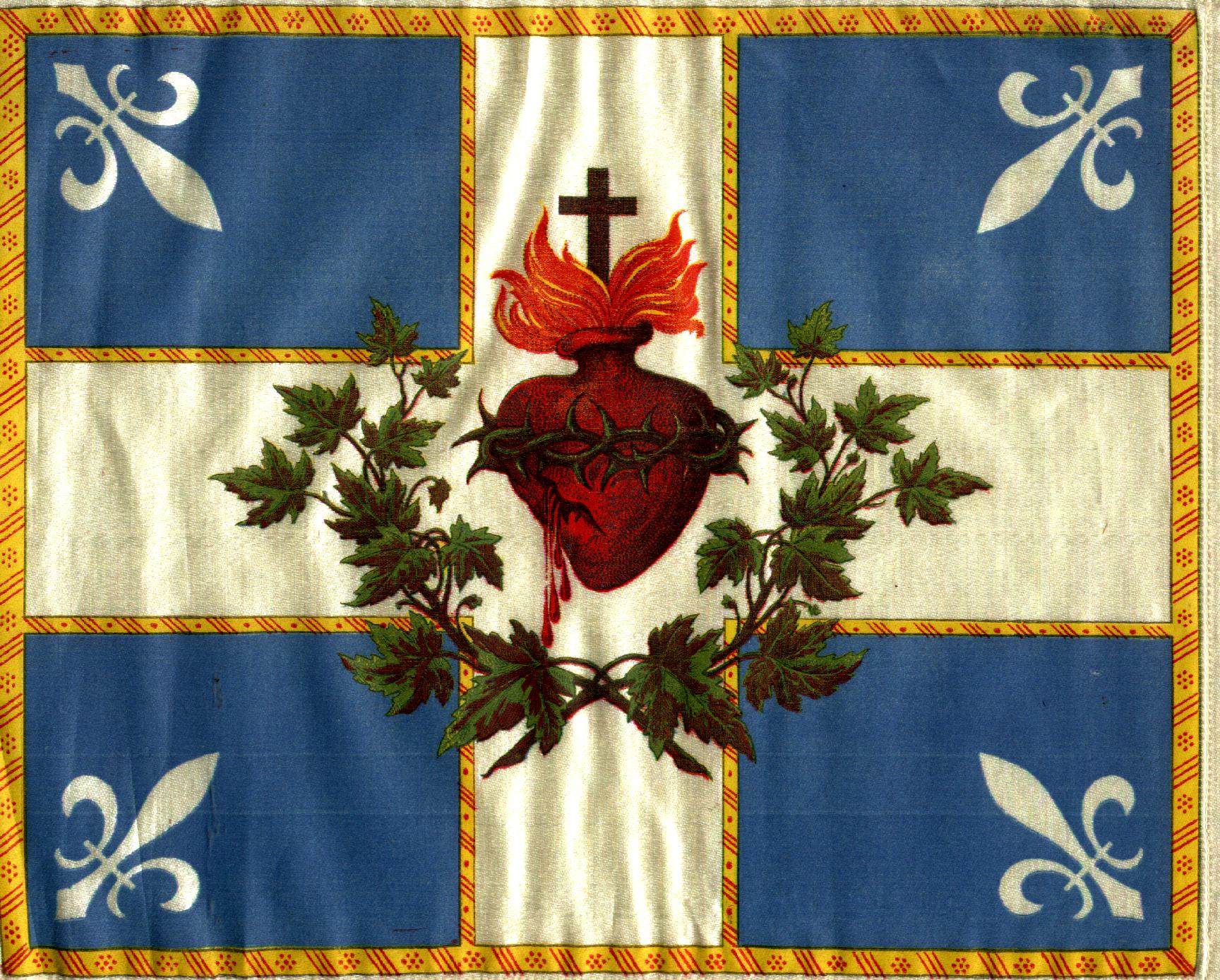
The Carillon-Sacré-Cœur: a flag waved by people on Saint-Jean-Baptiste Day from its creation in 1902 until 1948. The flag of Quebec is based on this design, and was adopted in 1948.

In 1834, Duvernay established the charitable Association Saint-Jean Baptiste in order to have the Saint-Jean-Baptiste celebrated that year. The association was chartered in 1849 with the mission of promoting social and moral progress. (See Saint-Jean-Baptiste Society.)

The celebrations were supported by the Catholic Church and were primarily religious around that time. The lighting of bonfires, a traditional custom on the Nativity of Saint John which ultimately reached back to pre-Christian Midsummer celebrations were still lit at night. In addition, the first Saint-Jean-Baptiste parades were organized. They became an important tradition over time. The procession of allegorical floats was introduced in 1874.

On June 24, 1880, the Saint-Jean-Baptiste Society organized the gathering of all francophone communities across North America. The event was the first National Congress of French Canadians (Congrès national des Canadiens français). On this occasion, the citizens of Quebec City were the first ones to hear Calixa Lavallée's "Ô Canada", based on a poem by a Quebec Superior Court judge, Adolphe-Basile Routhier. The song was commissioned by the Saint-Jean-Baptiste Society. It was well received but did not become a widely known song for many years. English words were later written for the royal tour in 1901. In 1980, "O Canada" became the official national anthem of Canada.

In 1908, Pope Pius X designated Saint John the Baptist as the patron saint of French Canadians. From 1914 to 1923 the processions were not held. In 1925, 91 years after the Ludger Duvernay's banquet in Montreal, June 24 became a legal holiday in Quebec.

== The Fête nationale ==
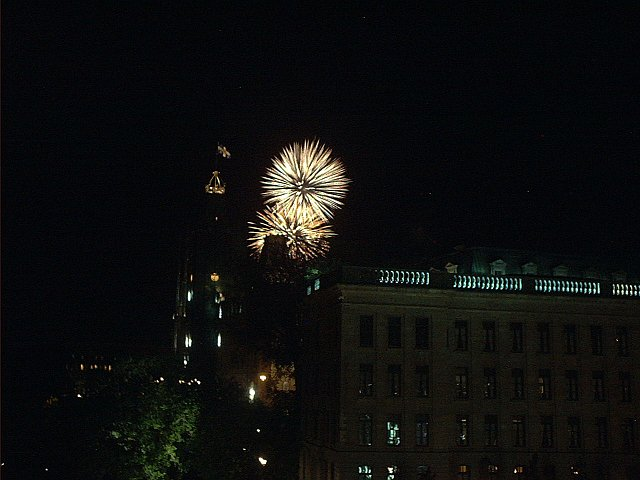
Fireworks over the Parliament Building in Quebec City on the eve of Saint-Jean-Baptiste Day

In Quebec, June 24 is officially a paid statutory public holiday called the "National Holiday" under the Act Respecting Labour Standards. In 1977, an Order in Council by Lieutenant Governor Hugues Lapointe, on the advice of Premier René Lévesque, declared June 24 the provincial holiday in Quebec.

The following year, the National Holiday Organizing Committee (French: Comité organisateur de la fête nationale) was created. The committee initially entrusted the organization of the events to the Société des festivals populaires du Québec. In 1984, on the occasion of the 150th anniversary of the SSJB, the organization of the celebrations was entrusted to the sovereigntist Mouvement national des Québécoises et des Québécois (MNQ).

By making it a statutory holiday, the day became a holiday for all Quebecers rather than only those of French-Canadian or Catholic origins. Celebrations were gradually secularized, primarily due to actions taken by the MNQ, and June 23 and 24 became as they are now known. Many festivities take place on the night before the holiday proper.

While the religious significance of the civic celebration is gone, the day remains popularly called la St-Jean-Baptiste or simply la St-Jean (notably by businesses), and is still observed in churches.

In 2010 and 2011, Franco-Ontarian New Democratic MP Claude Gravelle introduced a private member's bill in the House of Commons to recognize Saint-Jean-Baptiste Day as a federal holiday in Canada.

== Political nature of the celebration ==
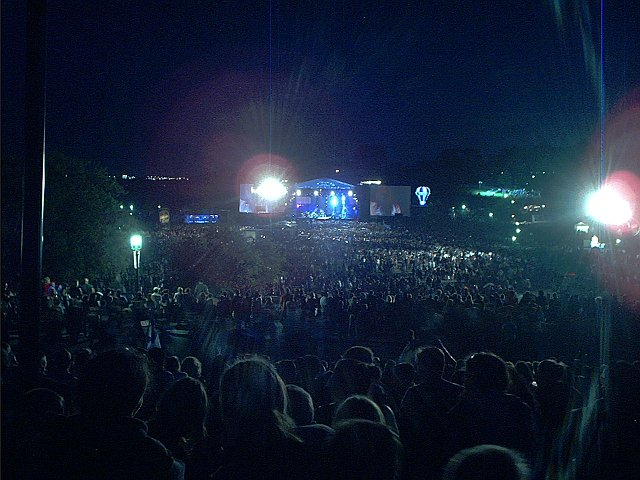
Free public concert in The Battlefields Park on the eve of Saint-Jean-Baptiste Day

During and immediately after the Quiet Revolution, Saint-Jean-Baptiste Day became highly politicised. The religious symbolism associated with the celebrations was replaced by political ideals of Quebec separatism.

Governor General Georges Vanier, who, as viceroy, had always fostered unity and biculturalism, found himself the target of Quebec sovereigntists in Montreal, on Saint-Jean-Baptiste Day, 1964, wherein a group of sovereigntists held placards reading Vanier vendu ("Vanier the sell-out") and Vanier fou de la Reine ("Vanier, jester to the Queen").

Four years later, with the new Prime Minister Pierre Trudeau in attendance on the eve of a general election, a riot broke out on Saint-Jean-Baptiste Day. A group of agitators threw bottles at the Prime Minister in an effort to make him feel unwelcome at the ceremony. Trudeau was filmed refusing to take cover or leave the grandstand, saying that he was a Québécois and would not be intimidated by a drunken mob. The scene was broadcast on Télévision de Radio-Canada's and CBC's evening news. Many saw it as an open act of courage, and the Prime Minister's defiance impressed the electorate and contributed to his Liberal Party winning a significant majority the next day.

During the French-language network SRC's televised coverage of the 1969 Montreal parade, filmmakers Bernard Gosselin and Pierre Perrault were asked to withdraw from the airwaves after nationalist and sarcastic comments. At one point they suggested the creation of a Ministry of Boastfulness and a High Commissioner of kvetching. There was a riot and the Saint-Jean-Baptiste icon was destroyed. This led to the interruption of the parade, which did not take place the next year.

In June 2009, Quebec bands Lake of Stew and Bloodshot Bill, whose members are bilingual anglophone Quebecers, were added to the program of a local celebration in Montreal called L'Autre St-Jean ("The Other St-Jean"). When it became known that they would be performing their songs in English, there were several complaints and later the musicians were barred from the celebrations. The Société Saint-Jean-Baptiste President, Mario Beaulieu, defended the decision to cancel these musicians' performances, by stating that the official language of the province of Quebec is French. However, after public outrage from both the anglophone and francophone communities, these two bands were returned to the program when it was clarified that the bands were free to sing songs in English as well as French.

By government regulation, however, the St-Jean program must be conducted in French (even by such internationally and nationally famous anglophone artists such as Martha Wainwright and Patrick Watson).

The festival has attempted to be more inclusive, as groups have sung in Creole and for the 2008 celebrations, Samian, "the world's first aboriginal Algonquin language rapper", sang at Montreal's celebration.

In 2017, there was a controversy at the Fête nationale parade when a float featuring white performers was performing a popular Québécois anthem, and pushed by several black youths dressed in beige. Spectators interpreted the sight as racist, and symbolic of slavery.
