= Laurent Laplante =

Canadian journalist and writer

- Born: Joseph Lucien Laurent Laplante; March 3, 1934; Verdun, Quebec, Canada
- Died: March 15, 2017 (aged 83); Lévis, Quebec, Canada
- Occupations: Journalist, essayist, detective writer
- Spouse: Loretta Laplante
- Children: 2

Joseph Lucien Laurent Laplante (March 3, 1934 – March 15, 2017) was a Canadian journalist, essayist and detective writer. He is the author of 20 books.

== Early life ==
Laurent Laplante was born in 1934 in Verdun, Quebec, Canada. He studied literature, history, philosophy and government.

== Career ==
Laplante taught at Université Laval. He became a journalist for Le Devoir, L’Action, Le Jour, Le Droit and Le Soleil. He was also a television and radio presenter, an essayist and the author of 20 books, including detective fiction. He was a member of the Union des écrivaines et des écrivains québécois.

Laplante won the 1996 Olivar-Asselin Award for his defense of the French language in Quebec through his journalism. He also received the Genève-Montréal Award for his essay Pour en finir avec l’olympisme in 1998, and the Saint-Pacôme Award for his detective novel Des clés en trop, un doigt en moins in 2002.

== Death ==
Laplante died of pancreatic cancer on March 15, 2017, in Lévis, Quebec. He was 83.

== Works ==
=== Essays ===
- Laplante, Laurent (1973). Recherchée : justice. Montreal: Ferron. OCLC 299893998.
- Laplante, Laurent (1985). Le suicide : les mythes, les tendances, les enjeux. Quebec: Institut québécois de recherche sur la culture. OCLC 572229759.
- Laplante, Laurent (1988). L'université : questions et défis. Quebec: Institut québécois de recherche sur la culture. ISBN 9782892241204. OCLC 18749631.
- Laplante, Laurent (1988). Le vingt-quatre octobre : journal. Quebec: Editions du Beffroi. ISBN 9782920449244. OCLC 22506172.
- Laplante, Laurent (1991). La police et les valeurs démocratiques. Quebec: Institut québécois de recherche sur la culture. ISBN 9782892241495. OCLC 23690594.
- Laplante, Laurent (1992). L'information, un produit comme les autres?. Quebec: Institut québécois de recherche sur la culture. ISBN 9782892241815. OCLC 27070150.
- Laplante, Laurent (1995). L'angle mort de la gestion. Quebec: Institut québécois de recherche sur la culture.
- Laplante, Laurent (1996). Pour en finir avec l'olympisme. Montreal: Boréal. ISBN 9782890527546. OCLC 803137783.
- Laplante, Laurent (1997). La démocratie, j'aime ça !. Sainte-Foy, Québec: Éditions MultiMondes. ISBN 9782921146548. OCLC 37993446.
- Laplante, Laurent (1998). La personne immédiate. Montreal: L'Hexagone. ISBN 9782890066021. OCLC 876450695.
- Laplante, Laurent (1998). La démocratie, je la reconnais. Sainte-Foy, Québec: Éditions MultiMondes. ISBN 9782921146746. OCLC 40300806.
- Laplante, Laurent (1999). La mémoire à la barre. Montreal: Editions Ecosociété. ISBN 9782921561457. OCLC 52312126.
- Laplante, Laurent (2000). L'utopie des droits universels : l'ONU à la lumière de Seattle. Montreal: Éditions Écosociété. ISBN 9782921561532. OCLC 45190991.
- Laplante, Laurent (2000). La démocratie, je l'apprends. Sainte-Foy, Québec: Éditions MultiMondes. ISBN 9781435625969. OCLC 191767039.
- Laplante, Laurent (2000). La démocratie, je l'invente. Sainte-Foy, Québec: Éditions MultiMondes. ISBN 9782921146869. OCLC 43427484.
- Laplante, Laurent (2001). Dixit Laurent Laplante. Ripon: Écrits des hautes-terres. ISBN 9782922404302. OCLC 499817384.
- Laplante, Laurent (2003). Les enfants de Winston : Essai sur le jovialisme. Quebec: Editions Anne Sigier. ISBN 9782891294430.
- Laplante, Laurent (2007). Dieu et ses fils uniques : essai sur le pluralisme et l'éducation. Quebec: Éditions MultiMondes. ISBN 9781435698789. OCLC 311117872.
- Laplante, Laurent (2008). La démocratie : entre utopie et squatteurs. Quebec: Éditions MultiMondes. ISBN 9782895443469. OCLC 857067394.
- Laplante, Laurent (2009). Par marée descendante : Échos d'un vieillissement. Laurent: Éditions MultiMondes. ISBN 9782895443681. OCLC 857067302.
- Laplante, Laurent (2012). Stephen Harper : le néo-Durham. Quebec: Éditions MultiMondes. ISBN 9782895444503. OCLC 903287373.

=== Detective novels ===
- Laplante, Laurent (2001). Des clés en trop, un doigt en moins. Quebec: L'Instant même. ISBN 9782895021650. OCLC 48958625.
- Laplante, Laurent (2006). Vengeances croisées. Chicoutimi, Québec: Éditions JCL. ISBN 9782894313480. OCLC 62742052.
- Laplante, Laurent (2009). Je n'entends plus que ton silence. Chicoutimi, Québec: Éditions JCL. ISBN 9782894313282. OCLC 56876466.
