= Natalie Chung =

Canadian news anchor and journalist

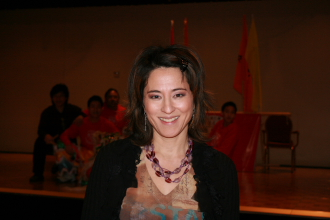
- Natalie Chung reporting the Chinese New Year at the MCCUC Montreal Chinese Community and Cultural Center in 2007.
- Born: 1962 (age 62–63); Toronto, Ontario, Canada
- Occupation(s): News anchor and journalist
- Employer: Réseau de l'information (RDI) television network

Natalie Chung (born 1962 in Toronto, Ontario) is a Canadian news anchor and journalist for the Réseau de l'information television network (now Ici RDI), a Canadian French language news channel owned by the Société Radio-Canada. She was anchor of RDI's weekend newscast Aujourd'hui and Le Monde ce soir.

== Biography ==
Chung was born to a Korean father, Joseph Chung, a former university teacher, and a mother named Lucie Lépine, from the province of Quebec. Although born in Toronto, she grew up in Montreal, Quebec. In her early life, her difference becomes an issue as she was often reminded that she comes from elsewhere while she perceives herself as a Quebecer only. Noting an identity crisis, her father decided to take his teenage daughter for the first time to his country of origin. In 1985, she began her undergraduate studies in Korean literary program at the Seoul University in South Korea and attended Concordia University in Montreal.

She is the news anchor and journalist for the Réseau de l'information television network (now Ici RDI), a Canadian French language news channel owned by the Société Radio-Canada. She was anchor of RDI's weekend newscast Aujourd'hui and Le Monde ce soir.
