= Le Point (TV series) =

Former Radio-Canada current affairs program

- Presented by: Simon Durivage; Denise Bombardier; Pierre Nadeau; Madeleine Poulin; Anne-Marie Dussault; Jean-François Lepine; Stéphan Bureau; Dominique Poirier
- Country of origin: Canada

Production
- Running time: 35 minutes

Original release
- Network: Radio-Canada
- Release: 1983 – 2006

Le Point (French pronunciation: [lə pwɛ̃]) is a Canadian television newsmagazine series, which aired on Radio-Canada from 1983 to 2006. The program, which aired following Le Téléjournal weeknights, explored the news in depth with interviews and documentary reports.

The program was introduced in 1983, one year after the network's English counterpart CBC Television introduced the similar series The Journal as a complement to its main newscast The National. It premiered on September 12 that year, with hosts Denise Bombardier and Simon Durivage, replacing the network's weekly news series Noir sur blanc. The program also represented an attempt to expand Radio-Canada's coverage of international affairs; prior to the program's introduction, the network maintained news bureaux only in Canada, while relying on television networks from France and Switzerland for its international coverage.

As with The Journal, however, the show struggled to establish itself at first; Bombardier, in particular, faced criticism for being seemingly unable to adapt her intense, probing interviewing style from Noir sur blanc to the demands of the new program's magazine format. She left the show after the first season, and was succeeded by Pierre Nadeau. The following year, Madeleine Poulin joined the show as a third host. Journalist Marcel Desjardins directed the program until 1988.

Nadeau left the show in 1988 to join TVA's news division, and was succeeded by Anne-Marie Dussault. Durivage left in 1992, and was replaced by Jean-François Lepine. Poulin left the program in 1996, with Lepine hosting the program solo thereafter.

In 1998, the program was merged with Le Téléjournal into an extended hour-long program anchored by Stéphan Bureau. The programs' titles were retained, however, with Le Téléjournal still referring to the program's early news headline segment and Le Point still referring to the later documentary and interview features.

When Bureau was succeeded by Gilles Gougeon in 2003, Le Point went back to separate hosting, with Dominique Poirier taking over the show until it was discontinued in 2006.
