= Olivar-Asselin Award =

The Olivar-Asselin Award (in French: Prix Olivar-Asselin) is an award created in 1955. It is given by the Saint-Jean-Baptiste Society of Montreal (SSJBM) to a Quebec journalist having distinguished themselves in the field of journalism. It is named after journalist Olivar Asselin, a former SSJBM president.

== Winners ==
- Jean-Marie Morin (1955)
- Alfred Ayotte (1956)
- René Lévesque (1957)
- Pierre Vigeant (1958)
- René Lecavalier (1959)
- Omer Héroux (1960)
- Harry Bernard (1961)
- Germaine Bernier (1962)
- Emery Leblanc (1963)
- Vincent Prince (1964)
- Jean-Marc Léger (1965)
- Marcel Adam (1966)
- Lucien Langlois (1967)
- Roland Prévost (1968)
- Claude Lapointe (1969)
- Paul Sauriol (1971)
- Judith Jasmin (1972)
- Roland Berthiaume (1973)
- Lysiane Gagnon (1975)
- Evelyn Dumas (1976)
- Fernand Seguin (1977)
- Jean-V. Dufresne (1978)
- Pierre Nadeau (1979)
- Jean Paré (1980)
- Bernard Derome (1981)
- Marcel Pépin (1982)
- Guy Cormier (1983)
- Claude Beauchamp (1984)
- Gérald Leblanc (1985)
- Louis-Gilles Francoeur (1986)
- Andréanne Lafond (1987)
- Michel Roy (1990)
- Renée Rowan (1991)
- Gilles Lesage (1993)
- Laurent Laplante (1996)
- Normand Lester (2001)
- Christian Rioux (2010)
- Pierre Allard (2014)
