= Sophie Thibault =

Canadian journalist (born 1961)

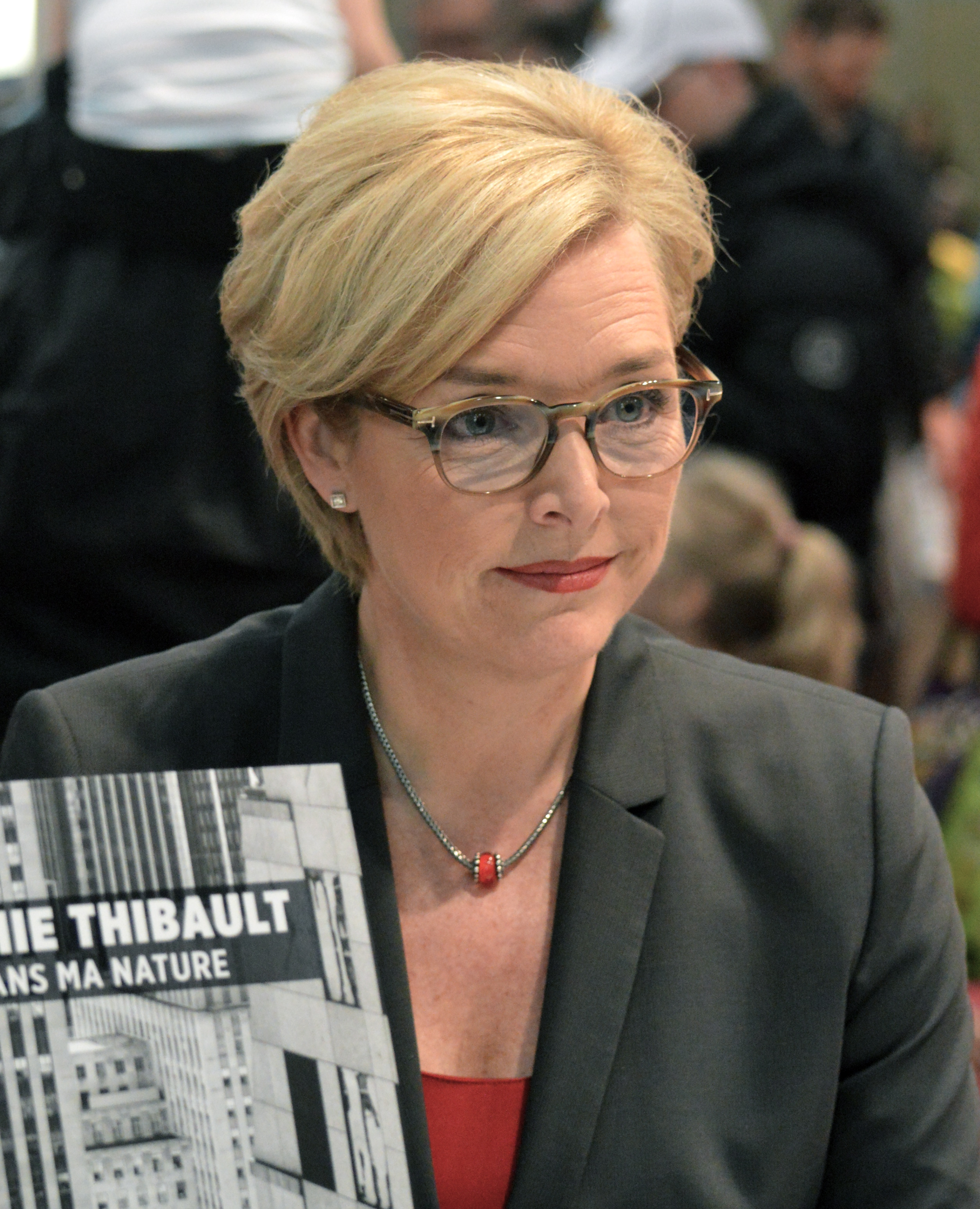
Sophie Thibault in 2017

Sophie Thibault CQ (born May 2, 1961) is a Quebec journalist and television reporter for the TVA network.

== Biography ==
She earned a bachelor's degree in psychology, after which she became a radio reporter for CINQ-FM and CHAI-FM. She continued journalism studies at the Université de Montréal with Pierre Dufault and later contributed to the newsmagazines Protégez-vous and La Vie en rose.

Her TV debut was in 1988 and in the summer of 1990 she provided coverage of the Oka crisis. Later on, she became a journalist for the morning show Salut, Bonjour!. She also collaborated on the Le Match de la vie involving colleague Claude Charron.

In 2002, following the departure of Simon Durivage, she became the anchor of Le TVA 22 heures, where she maintained an average audience of about 650,000 viewers. Sophie Thibault was the subject of a master's thesis by a former rad-can journalist in the United States: La Perspective féminine dans les téléjournaux.

In 2022 she moved to the network's early-evening TVA Nouvelles 17h, and was succeeded as anchor of the prime-time edition by Pierre-Olivier Zappa. In 2023 she took some time off the program to undergo treatment for skin cancer, returning to 17h in January 2024. In February 2025, she announced her retirement from TVA, with her last day slated to be June 19. succeeded as anchor of early-evening editions by Julie Marcoux.

Thibault was made a Knight in the National Order of Quebec in 2020.

== Personal life ==
She has remained close to her mother, who suffered from chronic multiple sclerosis. Her father, former news director of Radio-Canada Marc Thibault, died in 2006.

== Personal honors ==
- 2003: Woman of honor at the "Evening of the rare pearls" of the Montreal metropolitan Chamber of Commerce.
- 2003: Prix MetroStar, Best reporter for a news bulletin.
- 2004: Prix MetroStar, Best reporter for a news bulletin, and also a trophy for best public personality.
- 2005:Gala YMCA, Woman of the year award in communications.
- 2005: Prix MetroStar, Best reporter for a news bulletin.
- 2006: Assemblée nationale du Québec, she is given the title of Chevalier de l’Ordre de la Pléiade, by the Assemblée parlementaire de la Francophonie.
- 2006: Ordre du mérite de la radiodiffusion, given by the Association canadienne des radiodiffuseurs.
- 2006: Prix Artis, Best reporter for a news bulletin.
- 2007: Honored by the Gala of women of television and new media.
- 2007: Prix Artis, Best reporter for a news bulletin.
- 2008: Prix Artis, Best reporter for a news bulletin.
- 2010: Prix Artis, Best reporter for a news bulletin.
- 2020: Knight, National Order of Quebec
