= Action Montreal =

Municipal political party in Quebec Canada (1994)

Action Montreal was a short-lived municipal political party in Montreal, Quebec, Canada, that existed from February to April 1994 under the leadership of entrepreneur Claude Beauchamp.

== Origins and platform ==
Beauchamp began his campaign for mayor of Montreal in November 1993 as the leader of a new and as-yet-unnamed political movement. He formally launched Action Montreal on February 10, 1994, and indicated that the party would soon begin recruiting candidates for city council. The party was officially registered by Quebec's chief electoral officer on February 21, 1994.

During its short existence, Action Montreal was supported by three councillors: Nick Auf der Maur, Gérard Legault, and Vittorio Capparelli. The party could have formed the official opposition in March 1994 had it sought official recognition from council, but Beauchamp said that he did not wanthis party to achieve this status with councillors who had previously been elected for other parties. As such, Auf der Maur, Legault, and Capparelli officially served as independents.

Action Montreal advocated conservative views on economic issues. Beauchamp criticized the salaries of Montreal's civil servants at the party's launch and suggested that some positions could be abolished. He later suggested that services such as aqueducts, roads, swimming pools, and libraries could be run by the private sector or as private-public partnerships. Some opponents criticized the party's focus on business issues and described Beauchamp as little more than a representative of the city's business lobby.

One of the Action Montreal's founding members was Michel Pallascio, a former chair of the Montreal Catholic School Commission who had once suggested that Quebec should only accept immigrants with values reflecting the province's "Judeo-Christian" majority, a comment that was seen as intolerant toward immigrants from other backgrounds. Pallascio resigned from the party at Beauchamp's request after his past comments were highlighted in the media.

== Dissolution ==
Action Montreal ceased operations on April 5, 1994, when Beauchamp announced his resignation from the mayoral contest and gave his support to prospective Vision Montreal candidate Pierre Bourque. Shortly before his resignation, a Le Devoir poll indicated that Beauchamp was in fourth place among declared or likely mayoral candidates. Many Action Montreal members later joined either Vision Montreal or the Montrealers' Party.
