= Jennifer Chevalier =

Jennifer Chevalier is a Canadian radio producer and writer from Ottawa, Ontario, most noted as the head producer of the weekly current affairs program The House.

She published The Winter Witch, her debut novel, in 2026. The book was longlisted for the 2026 Giller Prize.
