= Télesphore Saint-Pierre =

Canadian journalist (1869–1912)

Télesphore Saint-Pierre (July 10, 1869, in Lavaltrie, Quebec – October 25, 1912, in Saint-Boniface, Manitoba) was a journalist, writer and editor. He had three children with his wife Stéphanie Guérin, and was an editor for La Patrie, La Minerve, Le Canada, au Soir, for The Gazette and for Montreal Daily Herald. He was also an author of an "Histoire du commerce canadien-français de Montréal, 1535–1893" (1894) and "Histoire des Canadiens français du Michigan et du comté d'Essex, Ontario" (1895).
