= Lysiane Gagnon =

Canadian journalist

Lysiane Gagnon is a Canadian journalist based in Quebec. She has written for Montreal's La Presse since 1980 and Toronto's Globe and Mail since 1990.

Gagnon was born in Montreal in 1941. From 1975 to 1980, she was a parliamentary correspondent. In 1975 she received the Olivar-Asselin Award, and has twice (in 1976 and 1982) been awarded the National Newspaper Awards prize. In 1984 she received the Salon de Montréal literary prize for her essay Vivre avec les hommes : un nouveau partage (Living with Men: A New Partnership). She has also published two collections of her columns, Chroniques politiques (Boreal, 1985) and L'esprit de contradiction (Boreal, 2010).

In her columns, Gagnon takes positions in regards to federalism and feminism.
