= Stéphan Bureau =

Canadian journalist

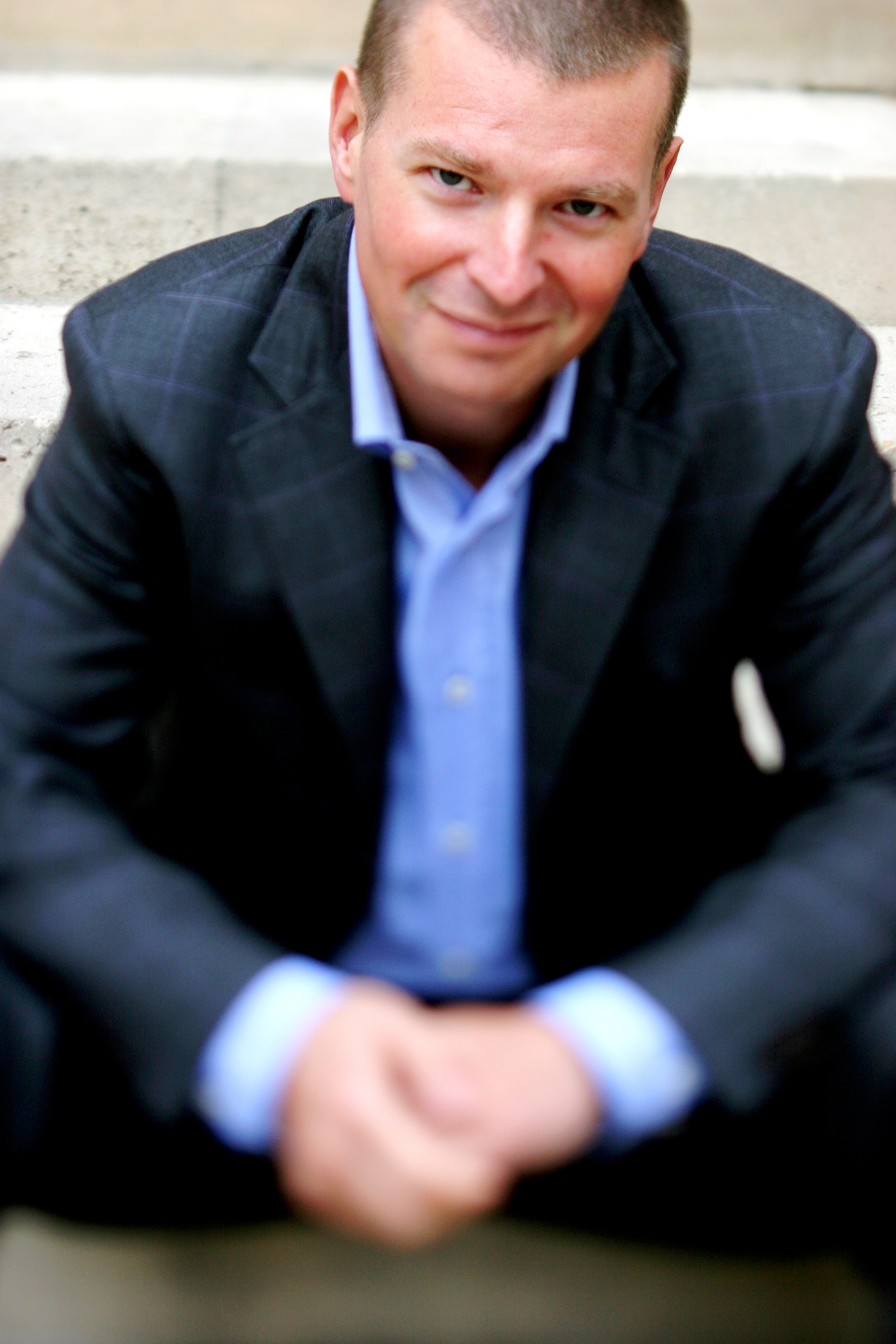
- Born: Stéphan Bureau; July 2, 1964 (age 62); Montreal, Canada
- Occupations: Television presenter, Journalist

Stéphan Bureau (born July 2, 1964) is a Canadian journalist, TV interviewer and producer of TV shows and documentary series.

== Life and career ==
Bureau was born in Montreal, Quebec. He successfully auditioned at Télévision de Radio-Canada, and became one of the youngest reporters in a TV show dedicated to teenagers.

He then began a radio journalism career in 1984 at Radio-Canada while pursuing Russian studies at Concordia University. In 1986, he embarked on a broadcast journalism career as a television newscaster at Télévision Quatre-Saisons (TQS; now V). Between 1990 and 1994, he produced and hosted Contact, a series of in-depth interviews with figures from the artistic, literary and intellectual world such as Paul Auster, Elie Wiesel, Nancy Huston, Michel Serres, and Carlos Fuentes. The documentary series, which was broadcast throughout Quebec and in many other countries of Europe and Africa earned him a Rogers Award in English Canada.

He has since been on all major French-Canadian television networks, most notably on TVA, where he was at the helm of L'événement, a public affairs magazine, and then on the 10 p.m. televised newscast for the next three years. He later joined the Société Radio-Canada where he served in turn as host, foreign correspondent and chief anchorman of the national newsmagazine Le Téléjournal/Le Point from 1998 to 2003.

In 2003, Stéphan Bureau chose to retire from the news world and started working on new projects. With the Festival Juste pour Rire (the French edition of the Just for Laughs Festival), he created and hosted several tributes to Quebec's comic figures. He also hosted several live interviews with famous comic actors such as Pierre Richard and Franck Dubosc.

In 2006, Stéphan Bureau reinitiated Contact with a new series of 13 episodes. His guests were film and theater director Franco Dragone; novelist Jean d'Ormesson; author and playwright Éric-Emmanuel Schmitt; short story writer Mavis Gallant; authors Marek Halter, Mario Vargas Llosa and José Saramago; philosopher, psychoanalyst and feminist Julia Kristeva; lawyer and politician Simone Veil; director and playwright Robert Lepage; author, journalist and film director Philippe Labro; French economist Jacques Attali, and French playwright and author Jean-Claude Carrière.

== Prizes and awards ==
Over the years, Stéphan Bureau has received several awards honoring the quality of his work, mainly as a newscaster and interviewer. Most of these prizes were awarded by the Academy of Canadian Cinema and Television.

- 1994 : Rogers Arts Award for documentary series Contact
- 1999 : Prix Gémeaux, Best TV Newscast for Le Téléjournal / Le Point
- 2000 : Prix Gémeaux, Best TV Newscast for Le Téléjournal / Le Point
- 2000 : Prix Gémeaux, Best interview : all categories for Le Téléjournal / Le Point
- 2001 : Prix Gémeaux, Best TV Newscast for Le Téléjournal / Le Point
- 2002 : Prix Gémeaux, Best TV Newscast for Le Téléjournal / Le Point
- 2006 : Nominee at Prix Gémeaux, Best biography or portrait, for Contact, the encyclopaedia of creation - episode featuring French writer Jean d'Ormesson
- 2006 : Nominee at Prix Gémeaux, Best Website for a TV series, for Contact, the encyclopaedia of creation
- 2008 : Was given the honor of Mérite du français 2008, awarded by the Conseil pédagogique inter-disciplinaire du Québec
- 2010 : Was given the honor of Chevalier de l'Ordre de la Pléiade awarded by the Assemblée parlementaire de la Francophonie
