= Bachelor of Film and Television =

Bachelor of Film and Television (usually BF&TV or BFTV) is an undergraduate bachelor's degree awarded to students who have studied elements of filmmaking and television production accredited university or accredited college.

This degree is a relatively new degree program offered mainly in Australia and differs from most degrees by its practical focus. Many universities offer Film and Television as a single unit, or series of units (major) study in a Bachelor of Arts, Bachelor of Fine Arts or Bachelor of Communications. Increasingly, colleges in Ontario granted degree-granting status, are delivering professional baccalaureate degrees combining practice and theory.

The degree usually consists of study in areas of Scriptwriting, Film and Television Directing, Animation, Sound, Cinematography, Lighting and Typography.

== Colleges and universities in Canada ==
- Sheridan College

== Universities in Australia ==
- Swinburne University of Technology
- Bond University
- Griffith University
- University of Melbourne Faculty of the VCA and MCM

== See also ==
- Film studies
- Television studies
