= Séraphin Marion =

Canadian professor, historian and literary critic

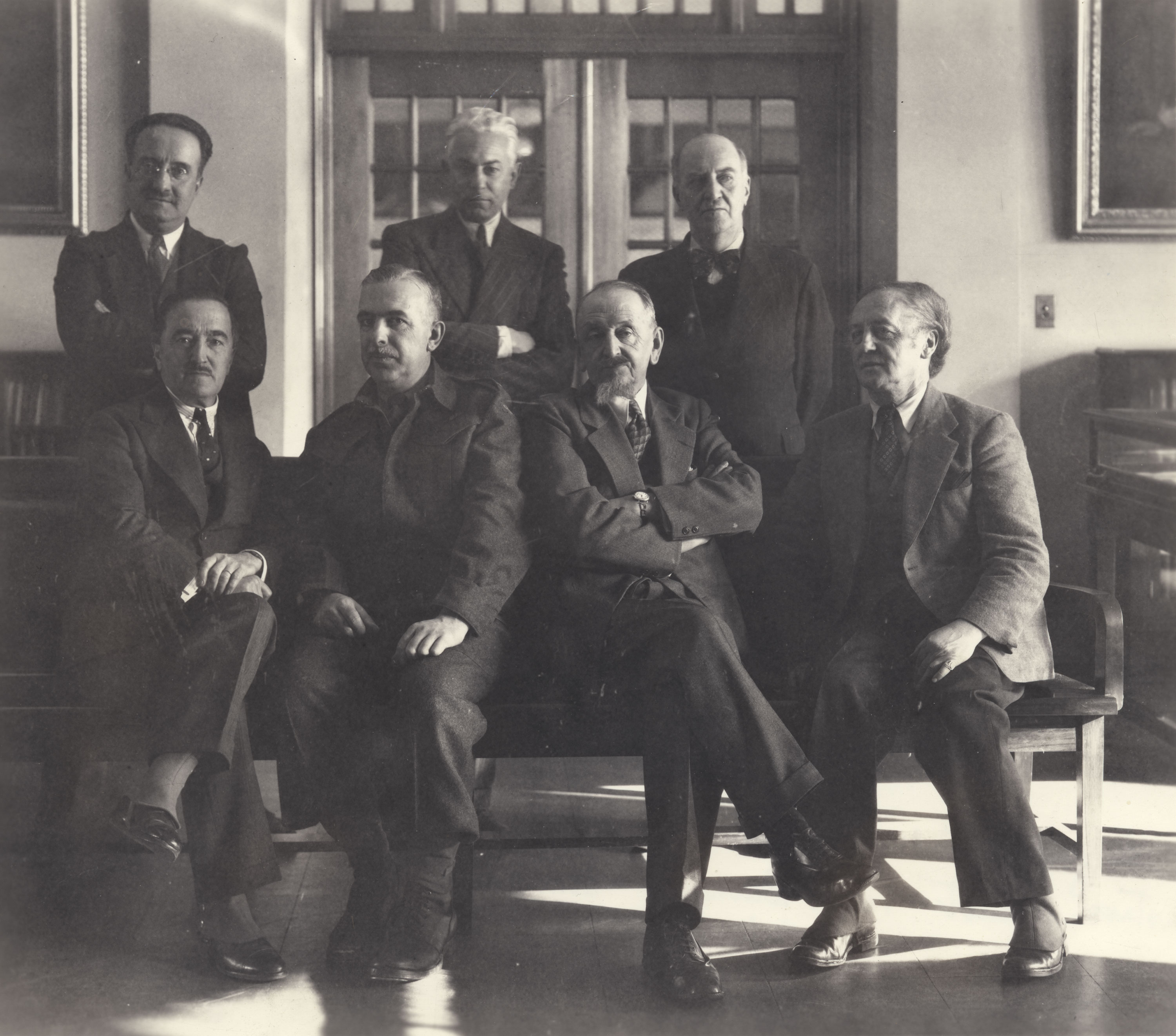
- Marion, left in the second row, 1945.
- Born: 1896; Ottawa, Ontario, Canada
- Died: 1983 (aged 86–87); Ottawa, Ontario, Canada
- Education: University of Ottawa; Université de Paris
- Occupations: professor, historian and literary critic

Seraphin Marion (1896–1983) was a Canadian professor, historian and literary critic.

== Biography ==
Marion was born in Ottawa on November 25, 1896. He was a vocal advocate of francophone rights outside Quebec. Marion graduated from the University of Ottawa with a BA in 1918 and MA in 1922. After receiving his doctorate from the Université de Paris, he taught French at the Royal Military College of Canada in Kingston, Ontario (1920-1923). From 1926 to 1954 he taught French and French-Canadian literature at the University of Ottawa, later being named professor emeritus. He authored 20 studies, including a nine-volume collection entitled Les Lettres canadiennes d’autrefois (published between 1939 and 1958). He served as head translator and later as director of historical publications at the Public Archives of Canada (1923-1953). He was a member of the Royal Society of Canada (1934), the Académie canadienne-française and the Société des Dix (1962). Séraphin Marion died in Ottawa on November 29, 1983.

== Honours ==
He was awarded the Académie de Lutèce Gold Medal (1933), the Conseil de la Vie Française en Amérique Silver Medal (1972), officer of the Order of Canada (1976) and member of the Ordre de Saint-Grégoire-le-Grand (1982).

== Legacy ==
The Séraphin Marion primary school in Ottawa, Ontario and Séraphin Marion street on the University of Ottawa campus were named in his honour. The Société Saint-Jean-Baptiste de Montréal awards the Prix Séraphin-Marion annually.

== Works ==
- French Travelers Relations in New in the seventeenth century, 1923
- A pioneer in Canada, 1927
- Leafing our writers. Study of Canadian literature, 1931
- Following in the footsteps of our writers, 1933
- Canadian Letters of yesteryear, 1939–1958
- Literary Origins of Canada French, 1951
- Top Canadian French facts, statements and commentaries by Anglophones, 1972
