= Les Affaires =

Canadian monthly business magazine

- Chief Editor: Marie-Pier Frappier
- Categories: Business newspaper
- Frequency: Monthly
- Publisher: Pierre Marcoux
- Founded: 1928
- Company: Contex Group Inc.
- Country: Canada
- Based in: Montreal, Quebec
- Language: French
- Website: www.lesaffaires.com
- ISSN: 0229-3404
- OCLC: 607494758

Les Affaires is a French-language monthly business-oriented newspaper publishing 14 issues per year. Founded in 1928, it is now owned by the Contex Group since 2019. Its headquarters is in Montreal. It is directed by Pierre Marcoux (President, Contex Group) and Marie-Pier Frappier (Chief editor).

Les Affaires is aimed at those who do or are interested in Quebec business through business journalism, original platforms to facilitate business development, and content relating to business management and personal finance.

The content features and relevant articles on management, business strategy and entrepreneurship. The newspaper aims to look beyond the facts in examining issues of topical interest.

The intended audience is business people and individuals age 30 to 55.

Les Affaires is available in print and digital editions through its App. The content of the newspaper as well as additional material is available online at lesaffaires.com, which is designed for compatibility with multiple platforms (mobile, tablets, computers, TVs). There is also a Facebook page, a Twitter account, an Instagram account and a LinkedIn company page. Les Affaires also has a division that organizes major events for the business community and a personal finance magazine Les Affaires Plus.

== See also ==
- List of newspapers in Canada
- List of Quebec media
- Claude Beauchamp
