= Ludger Duvernay =

Canadian politician

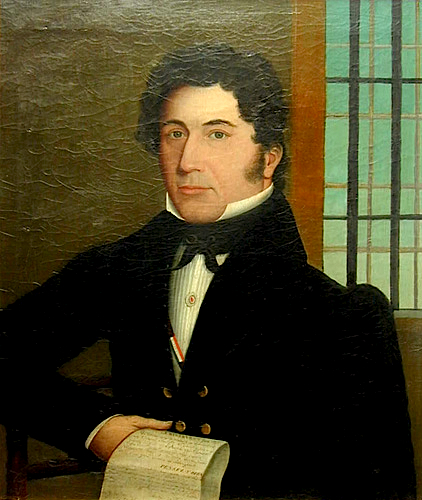
- Ludger Duvernay, 1832
- Born: January 22, 1799; Verchères, Quebec
- Died: November 28, 1852
- Occupations: Printer, editor, journalist, member of parliament, civil servant

Ludger Duvernay (January 22, 1799 – November 28, 1852), born in Verchères, Quebec, was a printer by profession and published a number of newspapers including the Gazette des Trois-Rivières, the first newspaper in Lower Canada outside of Quebec City and Montreal, and also La Minerve, which supported the Parti patriote and Louis-Joseph Papineau in the years leading up to the Lower Canada Rebellion.

== Biography ==
Duvernay was one of several journalists imprisoned early in 1832 for criticizing the non-elected legislative council that represented the interests of the Château Clique. Duvernay, editor of La Minerve and Daniel Tracey, another editor of the English language The Vindicator newspaper were arrested for libel and imprisoned together for 40 days for writing articles that said that "it is certain that before long all of America must be republican." They were released after much public support and condemnation of the arrests. He was arrested by the authorities on four separate occasions.

On April 5, 1836, he fought in a duel with Clément-Charles Sabrevois de Bleury, which ended with him being shot in the right knee.

On June 9, 1834, Duvernay founded the Association Saint-Jean-Baptiste (today, the Société Saint-Jean-Baptiste and designated June 24 a day of celebration of Canadien history and culture. The society was previously known as the Société Aide-toi et le ciel t'aidera ("help yourself and Heaven will help you"), founded by Duvernay on March 8, 1834.

Duvernay was briefly a member of the Legislative Assembly of Lower Canada representing Lachenaie in 1837. When on November 16 Governor Gosford issued warrants for the arrest of 26 patriot leaders, Duvernay was on the list. He had however been warned that his arrest was imminent and fled in time to Burlington, Vermont.

He returned to Montreal in 1842 to resume publication of a more moderate La Minerve, which was at first sympathetic to Louis-Hippolyte Lafontaine and then later, George-Étienne Cartier.

In 1922, June 24 became a public holiday in Quebec, and since 1977 it has been the national holiday of Quebec.

On his death in Montreal in 1852, 10,000 people attended his funeral. Duvernay was interred in the Cimetière Notre-Dame-des-Neiges.

== Work ==
=== Newspapers, reviews ===
- Gazette des Trois-Rivières, Trois-Rivières, 1817
- L'Ami de la religion et du roi, Trois-Rivières, 1820
- Le Constitutionnel, Trois-Rivières, 1823
- L'Argus, Trois-Rivières, 1826–1828
- Canadian Spectator, Montreal 1822-1829
- La Minerve, Montreal, 1826–1837 and 1842–1899
- Le Guide du cultivateur, ou Nouvel almanac de la température pour chaque jour de l'année, Montreal, 1830–1833
- Le Patriote Canadien, Burlington, Vermont, 1839-1840
- La Revue canadienne, Montreal, 1845–1848

=== Other ===
- "Liste des journaux publiés dans le Bas-Canada depuis 1764", in La Canadienne, Montreal, October 22, 1840 : 3–4

== See also ==
- History of Quebec
- Saint-Jean-Baptiste Society
