= La Minerve =

French-Canadian 19th century newspaper

- Front page of the August 21, 1837 of La Minerve, displaying the eponymous Minerva
- Owner: Ludger Duvernay
- Founder: Augustin-Norbert Morin
- Founded: 1826
- Ceased publication: 1899
- Headquarters: Montreal, Lower Canada

La Minerve (French for "The Minerva") was a newspaper founded in Montreal, Lower Canada (present-day Quebec) by Augustin-Norbert Morin to promote the political goals of Louis-Joseph Papineau's Parti patriote. It was notably directed by Ludger Duvernay in its earlier years. It existed from 1826 to 1837, and again from 1842 to May 27, 1899. Throughout the years, it went from being a radical paper to a conservative one.

== History ==
La Minerve was first published on November 9, 1826, and was soon bought by journalist and future Saint-Jean-Baptiste Society founder Ludger Duvernay in 1827. It was banned in 1837 during the events surrounding the Patriotes Rebellion, which sought to establish an independent republic for Lower Canada. Back from exile in the United States (he had been forbidden to return by Lord Durham because of his role in the Rebellion), Duvernay restarted publication in 1842.

La Minerve then defended the idea of responsible government and, after the death of Duvernay in 1852, the paper passed through various hands before becoming the organ of the Conservative Party of Canada. It became a daily in 1864 and defended the Canadian Confederation project which had been denounced by Papineau but was realized in 1867. The paper lost its governmental support when the Conservatives lost power in 1896 to the Liberal Party of Canada. Funding became scarce and the last edition was published on May 27, 1899.

== Trivia ==
- From June 14, 1830, to September 7, 1848, its namesake Minerva appeared upon the first page.
- The town of La Minerve, Quebec, and Lake La Minerve within this town are named after the newspaper.
- The title of the paper is apparently based on the French newspaper La Minerve. Titles of things such as newspapers and organizations inspired from France were common at the time.

== See also ==
- List of Quebec historical newspapers
- List of Quebec media
- Quebec independence movement
- History of Quebec
- List of newspapers in Canada
- Télesphore Saint-Pierre
