= Le Téléjournal =

Television newscasts on Ici Radio-Canada Télé

- Genre: News
- Presented by: Monday–Thursday: Céline Galipeau; Friday–Sunday: Pascale Nadeau
- Country of origin: Canada
- Original language: French

Production
- Production locations: Vancouver; Edmonton; Calgary (local weekend edition); Regina; Winnipeg; Toronto; Ottawa; Montreal; Sherbrooke; Trois-Rivières; Quebec City; Saguenay; Rimouski; Moncton
- Camera setup: Multi-camera
- Running time: Monday–Thursday: 60 minutes; Friday–Sunday: 30 minutes
- Production company: Canadian Broadcasting Corporation

Original release
- Network: Ici Radio-Canada Télé
- Release: March 22, 1954 – present

Related
- The National

Le Téléjournal (French pronunciation: [lə teleʒuʁnal]) is the umbrella title used for the television newscasts aired on the Ici Radio-Canada Télé broadcast network. Le Téléjournal (by itself) has been used since 1954 as the title of the network's flagship newscast, originating from Montreal, Quebec. It is considered the French language equivalent of the English-language CBC's The National.

From 1983 to 2006, Le Téléjournal was paired with a separate newsmagazine series called Le Point, similar to the distinction between CBC Television's The National and The Journal.

Other local and national newscasts airing on Radio-Canada adopted variants of the Téléjournal title beginning in the early 2000s. Local newscasts on Radio-Canada stations used to be known as (city or region name) Ce Soir (This Evening). They are also now called Le Téléjournal, usually followed by the name of the city or region, e.g., Le Téléjournal/Québec on CBVT-DT in Quebec City or Le Téléjournal/Acadie on CBAFT-DT in Moncton, New Brunswick. The Montreal program is Le Téléjournal avec Patrice Roy.

The network's national midday newscast, previously Le Midi and L'heure du midi, was also renamed Le Téléjournal/Midi in the early 2000s. In 2006, its breakfast newscast, Matin Express, was renamed Le Téléjournal/matin. It was later replaced on Radio-Canada with a simulcast of RDI Matin. RDI continues to air a half-hour program titled Le Téléjournal/matin.

== Primetime edition ==
The flagship newscast is anchored by Céline Galipeau on Mondays to Thursdays and Pascale Nadeau from Fridays to Sundays. The newscast airs live at 10 pm Eastern Time (ET), 11 pm in the Maritimes, 11:30 pm in Newfoundland, on Radio-Canada stations in Ontario, Quebec and the Atlantic, and on tape delay at 10 pm local in the western provinces. An early edition of the program used to air on RDI at 9 pm ET, but this has been replaced by a separate program titled Le Téléjournal RDI, hosted by Geneviève Asselin. Every Thursday, the Points de vue segment hosted by Galipeau features journalists Tasha Kheiriddin, Michel David and François Cardinal in a question-and-answer session devoted to significant stories of the week.

Bernard Derome anchored the program from 1970 to 1998. He was succeeded by Stéphan Bureau, who anchored the program from 1998 until 2003 when he was replaced by Gilles Gougeon. Derome was brought back as anchor in 2004 in an effort to return the program to its earlier success. He retired from the program again on December 18, 2008. Galipeau, who succeeded Derome as the program's main anchor, used to be the weekend anchor.

On August 17, 2026, Azeb Wolde-Giorghis will replace Galipeau as the main anchor.

== Local Téléjournals ==
Local newscasts under the Téléjournal name air on all stations in the Radio-Canada network. The newscasts run for 30 minutes, except for Ontario and some Quebec stations, where it runs for an hour.

Local newscasts, called Le Téléjournal (name of region/city) unless otherwise indicated, are produced in the following regions hosted by the following anchors.

- Alberta (CBXFT-DT) - Jean-Emmanuel Fortier in Edmonton, Fuat Seker in Calgary
- Atlantic Canada (CBAFT-DT, as Le Téléjournal/Acadie) - Karine Godin, Janic Godin
- Bas-Saint-Laurent/Côte-Nord/Gaspésie (CJBR-DT, as Le Téléjournal/Est du Québec) - Charles-Alexandre Tisseyre, Denis Leduc
- British Columbia (CBUFT-DT) - Julie Carpentier, Noémie Moukanda
- Estrie (CKSH-DT) - Marie Eve Lacas, Pierrick Pichette
- Manitoba (including Ontario within CT) (CBWFT-DT) - Godlove Kamwa, Cedrick Noufele
- Mauricie–Centre-du-Québec (CKTM-DT) - Julie Grenon, Jonathan Roberge
- Montreal (CBFT-DT, as Le Téléjournal avec Patrice Roy) - Patrice Roy
- Ontario (ET areas only) (CBLFT-DT; late nights on CBOFT-DT) - Mathieu Simard, Sébastien St-François
- Ottawa–Gatineau (CBOFT-DT evenings) - Mathieu Nadon, Daniel Bouchard
- Quebec City (CBVT-DT) - Bruno Savard, Louis-Simon Lapointe
- Saguenay–Lac-Saint-Jean (CKTV-DT) - Mélanie Patry, Jean-François Coulombe
- Saskatchewan (CBKFT-DT) - Julien Lecacheur, Philippine François-Gascard

The network's two now-defunct private affiliates aired newscasts at 6:30 pm, after simulcasting one of the network-owned stations' newscasts.

- Abitibi-Témiscamingue (CKRN-DT) - Alexandre Dubé (following Le Téléjournal Grand Montréal 18 h); CKRN-DT closed down in 2018.
- Bas-Saint-Laurent/Charlevoix (CKRT-DT) - Marc Larouche (following Le Téléjournal/Est du Québec); CKRT-DT closed down in 2021.
