= Bernard Derome =

Canadian broadcaster

- Born: January 10, 1944 (age 82); Montreal, Quebec, Canada
- Occupation: News anchor
- Notable credit(s): Le Téléjournal anchor (1970–1998, 2004–2008)

Bernard Derome, CM, OQ (born January 10, 1944) is a Canadian broadcaster, who was news anchor for the weeknight editions of Le Téléjournal on Radio-Canada until December 18, 2008.

== Biography ==
Derome studied at Saint Lawrence College under the instruction of the Clerics of Saint-Viateur. In 1963, when he was 19 years old, he began his first job in broadcasting at radio station CJBR in Rimouski. He moved to Canada's government funded French-language broadcaster, Radio-Canada, in 1965 and began anchoring Aujourd'hui (Today) in 1967.

Derome was chief news anchor for Radio-Canada Television from 1970 to 1998, hosting the nightly Le Téléjournal. He firmly established his credentials during the October Crisis and anchored the network's coverage of provincial and federal elections, including the 1980 referendum, the Charlottetown Accord referendum and the 1995 referendum.

After leaving the anchor chair in 1998, Derome anchored several news and documentary programs, including 5 sur 5, Le Monde and La Grande Aventure de la télévision. In 2004, after a drop in ratings for Le Téléjournal, Radio-Canada asked Derome to replace Gilles Gougeon, who had succeeded Stéphan Bureau in the role. In 2008, Derome announced his intention to leave the anchor post at year's end. His final broadcast took place on December 18. He was succeeded by Céline Galipeau, formerly the program's weekend anchor.

In 2015, he joined classical music radio station CJPX-FM as a morning presenter.

== Awards ==
- Olivar-Asselin Award (1981)
- Order of Canada (1994)
- Order of La Pléiade (2000)
- National Order of Quebec (2006)
