= Céline Galipeau =

Canadian news anchor

Céline Galipeau OC OQ
- Born: March 11, 1957 (age 69); Longueuil, Quebec, Canada
- Occupation: News anchor
- Notable credit(s): Le Téléjournal weekend anchor (2003–2008); Le Téléjournal weekday anchor (2008–present)

Céline Galipeau OC OQ (French pronunciation: [selin ɡalipo]) is a Canadian news anchor for Radio-Canada. Known for her coverage from Moscow, she is currently the weekday anchor of the network's flagship newscast Le Téléjournal.

== Early life ==
Galipeau was born in Longueuil, Quebec in 1957. She is the daughter of Georges Galipeau, a French Canadian diplomat and Pham Thi Ngoc Lang, a Vietnamese refugee from the First Indochina War.

== Education ==
Galipeau earned her master's degree in political science and sociology from McGill University in 1983.

== Career ==
After a short stint in private TV and radio, Galipeau came to Toronto as a reporter for CBC and Radio-Canada in 1985 until she left for Montreal in 1987. In 1989, she returned to Toronto to become a national reporter. In 1992 she became a correspondent in London. Later, she transferred to Moscow where she covered Boris Yeltsin and the war in Chechnya. In 1997, she moved to Paris. In 2001, she became a foreign correspondent in Beijing. Galipeau won a Gemini Award for her coverage from Moscow.

She returned to Canada in 2003, becoming the weekend anchor for Le Téléjournal. She became the program's weekday anchor in December 2008 following the retirement of Bernard Derome. She was succeeded as weekend anchor by Pascale Nadeau.

Galipeau was named to the National Order of Quebec in June 2009, then to the Order of Canada in May 2013.

In 2025 she was named the recipient of the Prix René-Lévesque for her career in journalism.

In 2026 she announced her retirement from Le Téléjournal, effective June 18, although she will remain with Radio-Canada as host of a new weekly newsmagazine series.
