= Judith Jasmin =

Canadian journalist

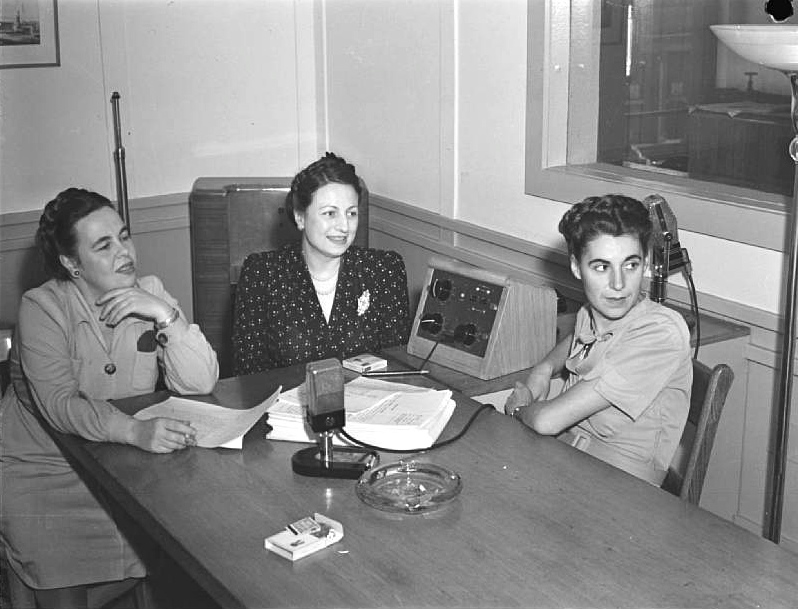
Marcelle Barthe, Berthe Lavoie and Judith Jasmin, three directors of CBF (Radio-Canada) in Montreal in 1945, meeting in the studio.

Judith Jasmin (July 10, 1916 – October 20, 1972) was a journalist from Quebec. Born in Terrebonne, Quebec, Canada, she was the first woman from Quebec to become a grand reporter (special correspondent).

Jasmin's journalistic career began at Radio-Canada's world service at the end of the 1940s. It was there she met future Quebec premier René Lévesque with whom she would go on to co-host the radio program Carrefour. In 1953, Jasmin entered Radio-Canada's television news service where she made a name for herself with such programs as Reportages and Conférence de presse. All the while, Jasmin continued to take to the streets, listening to the people in order to denounce injustices. She was a founding member of the Mouvement laïque de langue française ("The Francophone Secular Movement").

Jasmin later worked abroad and reported on her experiences for audiences in Quebec.

In 1966, Radio-Canada named Jasmin their United Nations correspondent and, later, their Washington correspondent.

After being diagnosed with cancer, she returned to Montreal in 1970 where, despite her illness, she continued to report on public affairs.

She died in Montreal in 1972.
