= Saint-Jean-Baptiste Society =

Institution in Montréal dedicated to protection of francophone interests

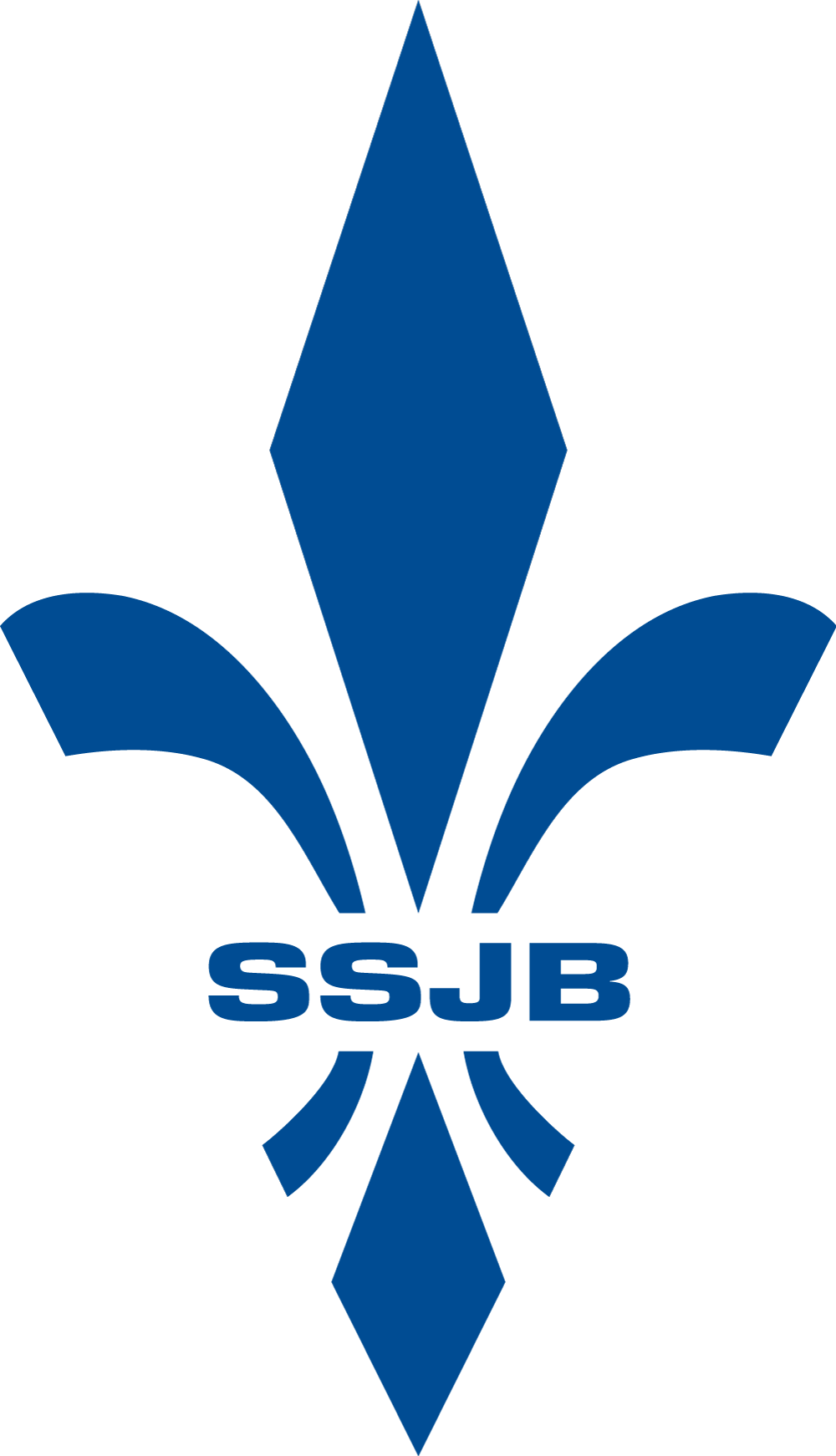

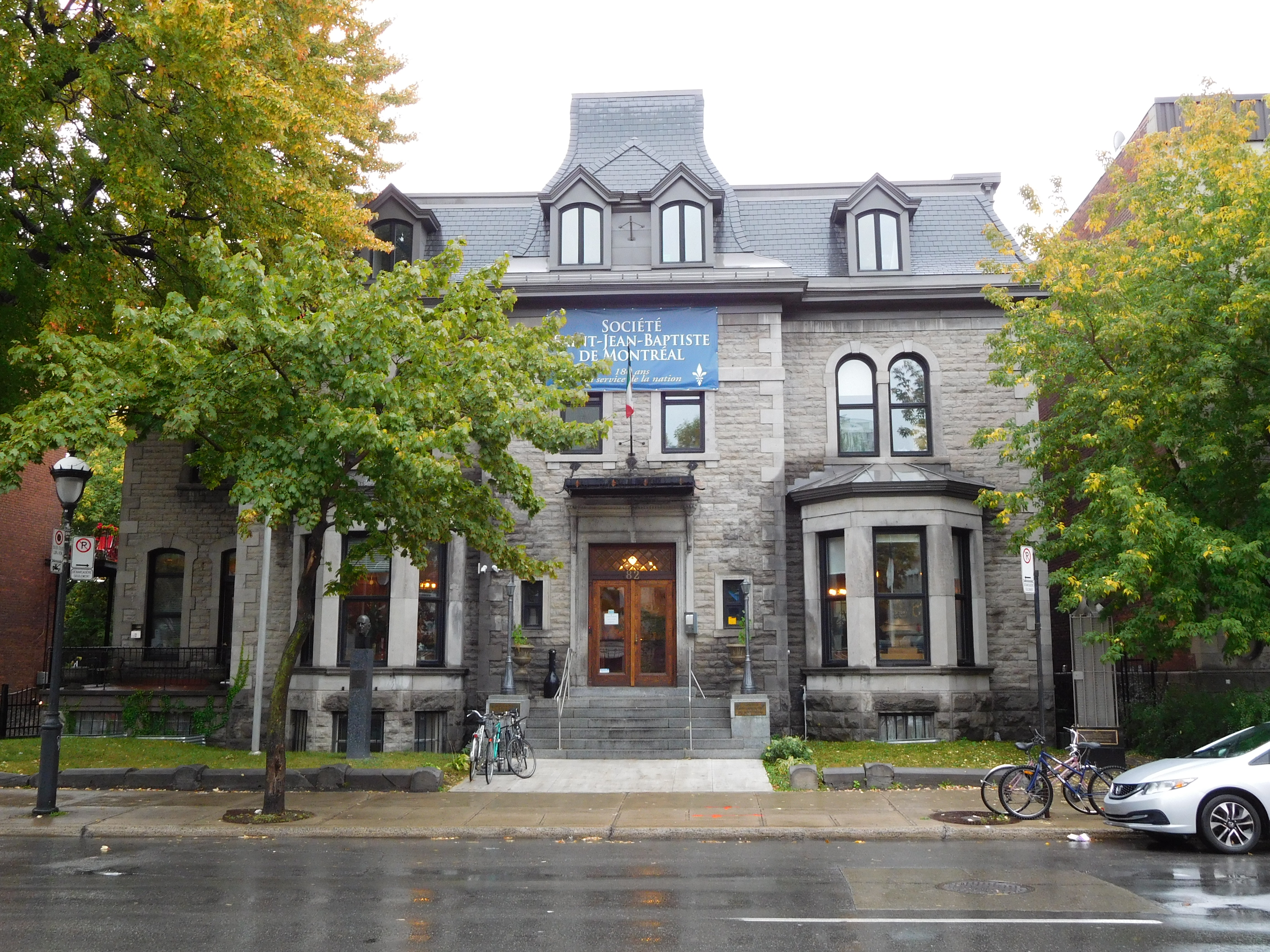
- Maison Ludger-Duvernay
- Established: June 9, 1843
- Founder: Ludger Duvernay
- Headquarters: Maison Ludger-Duvernay; 82 rue Sherbrooke Ouest; Montreal, Quebec, Canada
- Coordinates: 45°30′41″N 73°34′10″W
- President: Marie-Anne Alepin
- Key people: Martin Gélinas
- Website: Official website

The Saint-Jean-Baptiste Society (French: Société Saint-Jean-Baptiste, pronounced [sɔsjete sɛ̃ ʒɑ̃ batist]) is an institution in the Canadian province of Quebec dedicated to the protection of Quebec francophone interests and to the promotion of Quebec sovereignism. It is known as the oldest patriotic association in French North America. The society's president from 2009 to 2014, Mario Beaulieu, subsequently became leader of the Bloc Québécois. Its current president, Maxime Laporte, is known for being coordinator (president) of Cap sur l'indépendance, an umbrella group of various independentist organisations.

== History ==
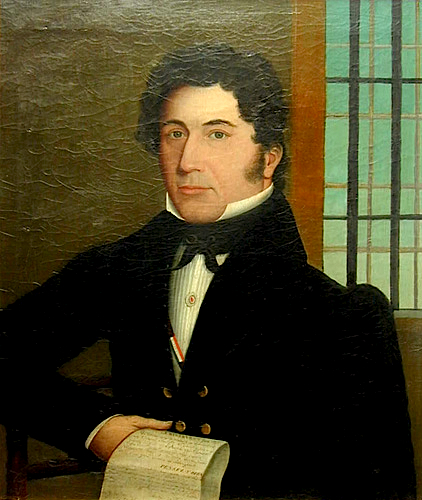
Ludger Duvernay

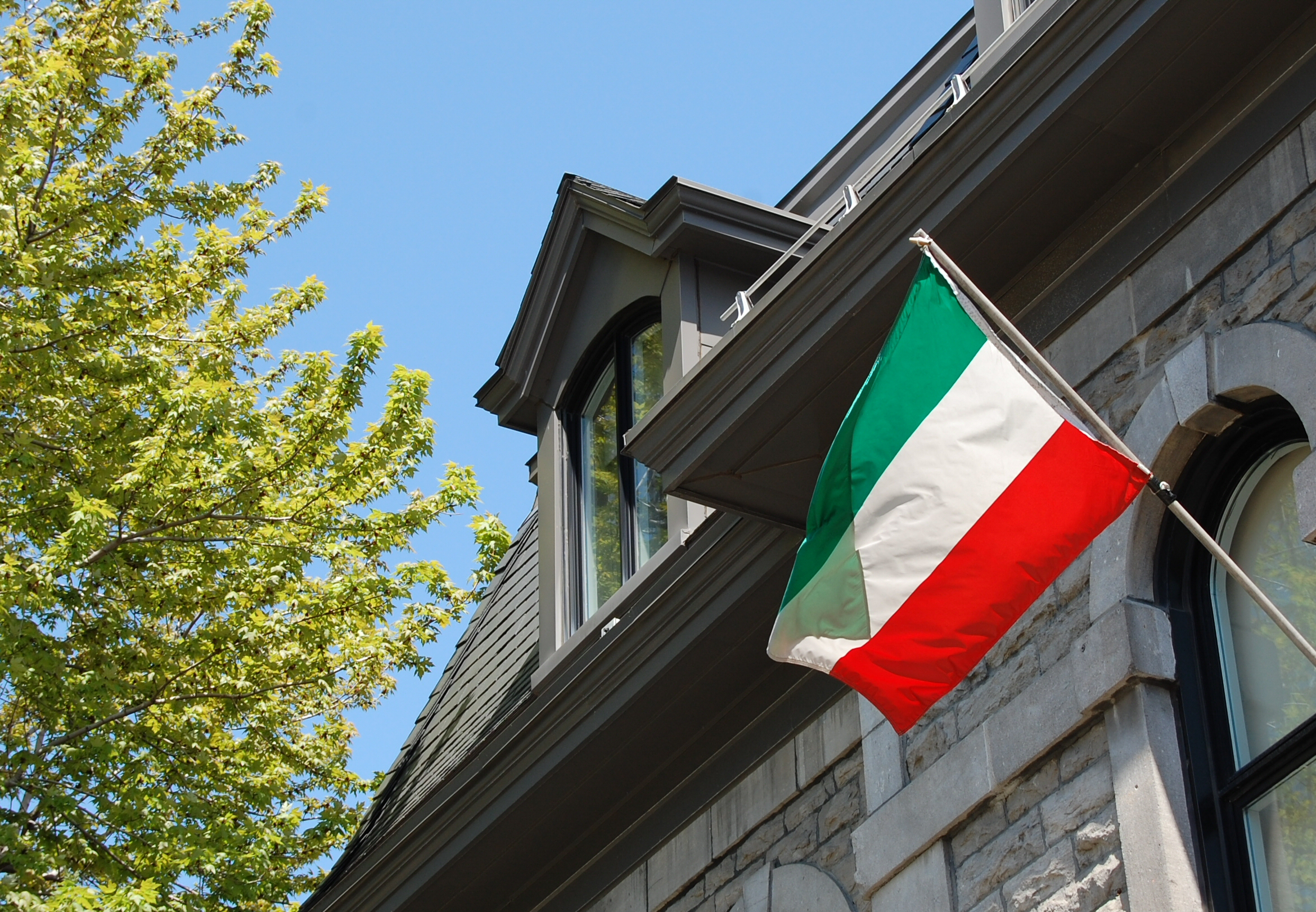
Patriot flag in front of Saint-Jean-Baptiste Society head office, Maison Ludger Duvernay

The society was created by Ludger Duvernay, a journalist for La Minerve in Lower Canada. It evolved from the Société Aide-toi et le ciel t'aidera ("help yourself and heaven will help you"), which was founded by Duvernay on March 8, 1834. Most notably, it made the 24th of June St. John the Baptist day, the national day of the Quebecers. In 1922, June 24 became a public holiday in Quebec, and since 1977 it has been the national holiday.

In the 1830s, Lower Canadians of British and (French) Canadian origin founded various charitable and social societies. On December 19, 1834, the English of Lower Canada established the Saint George's Society of Montreal, and the Saint George's Society of Quebec on October 12, 1835. The Irish of Lower Canada founded the St. Patrick's Society of Montreal on March 17, 1834. The (French) Canadians established what would become the Saint-Jean-Baptiste Society on June 24, 1834. The Scots of Lower Canada founded the Saint Andrew's Society of Montreal on February 6, 1835. The German Society of Montreal was also established in 1835.

At its foundation, the Saint-Jean-Baptiste Society used the Lower-Canada patriot flag. At the end of the 19th century, recognizing that the custom had become established, it adopted the tricolor flag of France with a maple leaf at the center (in the white part) in 1888. Since 1902 the Carillon flag, created by Elfège Filatreau, became established gradually. It was, in a modified form, adopted as the flag of Quebec in 1948.

Although similar societies also existed in other parts of British North America or the United States, the societies of Lower Canada were created in a different context. The Saint-Jean-Baptiste Society was established to promote French-Canadian interests within Canada and to preserve the French language and culture, as well as the Roman Catholic religion. It has been active in social, cultural, educational, political, and economic spheres. The society was instrumental in the creation of the École des Beaux-Arts de Montréal, the École des Hautes Études Commerciales de Montréal, the Monument-National, and the Société nationale de fiducie. In 1899, it created the Caisse nationale d'économie and contributed to the Chambre de Commerce de Montréal. The society has also created many organizations to assist in its mission—notably La Fondation du Prêt d'Honneur (1944) and the Fondation J.-Donat-Langelier (1988).

The Saint-Jean-Baptiste Society had a motto, a flag, an emblem and a patriotic goal. The motto was "Our institutions, our language and our rights." Initially, the society adopted the maple leaf as its emblem, and its Quebec City branch was the first promoter of the song "O Canada" as a symbol of the French-Canadian nation, together with the Carillon Sacré-Coeur flag. The leaf and anthem have since been appropriated by English Canada as national Canadian symbols (a bilingual version of the song eventually became the national anthem of Canada in 1980), and are now seen as inimical to the ideas of the SSJB and many Quebec nationalists.

The society had local branches in all the major French-Canadian communities in Quebec, the other Canadian provinces, and the United States. It has however changed considerably over time. When it was created, the French-speaking inhabitants of Canada constituted the only large group wishing to see Canada become an independent country from the British Empire. The Saint-Jean-Baptiste Society was an expression of this desire in all its activities. The group, however, was not anti-royalist; for instance, the society's president in 1959 requested, with the support of the Mayor of Quebec City, that Elizabeth II, Canada's queen, light the main bonfire on the eve of Saint-Jean-Baptiste Day; though the petition was rejected by Howard Graham, the Queen's Canadian Secretary at the time.

During the 20th century, the Saint-Jean-Baptiste Society focused its action in Quebec and it is now a proponent of the independence of Quebec from Canada.

Despite the timid position on the Canadian Royal Family they once held, in 2009 the Saint-Jean-Baptiste Society and Réseau de Résistance du Québécois (RRQ) mounted demonstrations and threw eggs at Canadian soldiers during the visit of Prince Charles and Camilla, Duchess of Cornwall, to the Black Watch Regiment in Montreal, on Remembrance Day, requiring the intervention of riot police.

There are 14 sections of the Société Saint-Jean-Baptiste de Montréal in the Greater Montreal Area. The societies are tied to the Mouvement national des Québécoises et des Québécois (MNQ), which also counts 14 affiliated Saint-Jean-Baptiste societies or sociétés nationales in the rest of Quebec.

== Awards ==
The society awards a number of prizes for various achievements.

- Patriot of the Year, for the defense of the interests of Quebec (began in 1975)
- Bene merenti de patria, for patriotism (began in 1923)
- Ludger-Duvernay Prize, for literary talent (began in 1944)
- Olivar-Asselin Award, for journalism (began in 1955)
- Calixa-Lavallée Award, for music (began in 1959)
- Louis-Philippe-Hébert Award, plastic arts (began in 1971)
- Victor-Morin Award (Prix Victor-Morin), for theater (began in 1971)
- Esdras-Minville Award, for social science (began in 1978)
- Maurice-Richard Award, for excellence in sports (began in 1979)
- Léon-Lortie Award, sciences (began in 1987)

== See also ==
- List of presidents of the Saint-Jean-Baptiste Society of Montreal
- Lower Canada Rebellion
- Culture of Quebec
- Union Saint-Jean-Baptiste d'Amérique
