= Nasra Agil =

Canadian businesswoman and former politician

Nasra Agile نصرة العقيل
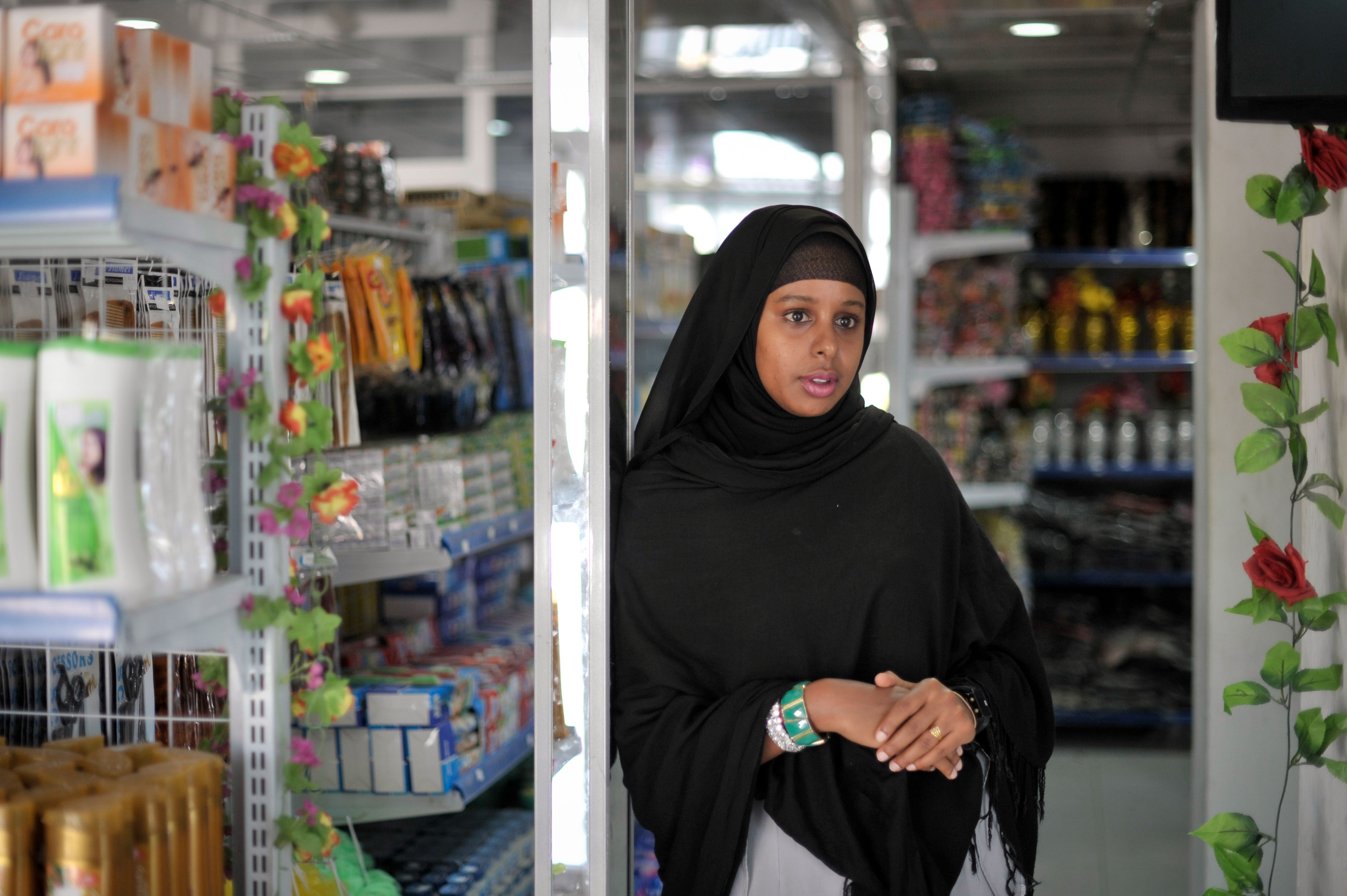
- Born: Somalia
- Education: Ryerson University
- Occupations: Civil engineer and entrepreneur

Nasra Agile (Somali: Nasra Cagil; Arabic: نصرة العقيل) is a Somali-Canadian civil engineer and entrepreneur. She has been involved in a variety of community service programmes and initiative, and was awarded The Duke of Edinburgh's International Award - Canada.

== Personal life ==
Agile was born in Somalia. She and her family later moved to Canada. As a teenager, Agile helped launch various community service initiatives. She organized youth programs, survival skills workshops, educational plays and sporting activities. For her tertiary education, Agile studied civil engineering at Ryerson University in Toronto. She graduated from the institution with Honours in 2005, earning a Bachelor of Engineering degree. Nasra graduated at the top of her class at Ryerson University and is recorded as one of the first known women of Somali descent to earn an engineering degree in Canada. She also received the prestigious Golden Key International Honour Society Award for academic excellence.

== Career ==
Agile began her civil engineering career as a road inspector for the Transportation Services department of the City of Toronto government. After a two-year period, she moved to Dubai, United Arab Emirates, which had evolved into one of the main global centers for major real estate development. In 2007, Agile joined Cansult, a Canadian engineering firm headquartered in Dubai and one of the largest industry operators in the Middle East. She later served as an advisor to Nakheel Properties, the biggest real estate developer in the UAE. She was also a Senior Traffic Engineer for the Dubai Municipality's Roads Authority.

In 2012, Agile returned to Somalia to contribute to the local post-conflict reconstruction process. She subsequently opened the country's first dollar store.

== Awards ==
In recognition of her societal work, Agile was presented The Duke of Edinburgh's International Award - Canada by the Governor General of Canada. She also received various academic awards for her scholastic achievements while still an honours student, including the Golden Key International Honour Society Award.
