= Saving Jessica Lynch =

2003 American television film

- Movie poster
- Written by: John Fasano
- Directed by: Peter Markle
- Starring: Laura Regan
- Music by: Ramin Djawadi
- Country of origin: United States
- Original language: English

Production
- Producers: Bob Chmiel, Michael R. Joyce, and Dan Paulson
- Editor: Scott Boyd
- Running time: 94 minutes
- Production company: NBC

Original release
- Network: NBC
- Release: November 9, 2003

Saving Jessica Lynch is a 2003 American television film that aired on NBC and features Canadian actress Laura Regan in the title role. The film begins with the ambush of Jessica Lynch's convoy in the middle of an Iraqi city and follows a version of events that credits an Iraqi citizen, Mohammed Odeh al-Rehaief, with being responsible for helping to arrange a daring rescue by US special operations forces.

== Cast ==
- Michael Rooker as Colonel Curry, who helps plan the rescue mission
- Nicholas Guilak as Mohammed Al-Rehaief
- Laura Regan as Private First Class Jessica Lynch
- Brent Sexton as Greg Lynch Sr., Jessica's father
- Mark Moses as a Lieutenant
- Benjamin King as 1st Sergeant Robert J. Dowdy
- Crystle Lightning as PFC Lori Piestewa
- Susan Pari as Iman Al-Rehaief
- Denise Lee as Specialist Shoshana Johnson
- Brent Anderson as Capt. Troy King
- Amy Jones as Dee Lynch
- Ethan Rains as Iman Nazemzadeh (Iraqi Deserter)
- Rafael Tamayo as Specialist Edgar Hernandez
- Dak Rasheta as Sergeant James Riley (as Dak Rashetta)
- Reed Frerichs as Pvt. Dale Nace
- Oliver Tull as Sgt George Buggs
- Josh Berry as Specialist Edward Anguiano
- Donny Boaz as Patrick Miller (soldier)

== Inaccuracies ==
Although the film was based on a true story, most of the circumstances of the rescue have been challenged by the media as well as by Lynch herself. Lynch was portrayed as a heroic soldier who fought up to her capture. In reality, at the time of the crash of her vehicle, she was knocked unconscious and woke up at the hospital with serious injuries. Her rescue operation was carried out at an unresisting civilian hospital. In a review of the movie, Hal Erickson wrote, "An inordinate amount of poetic license is taken with the events surrounding Jessica's rescue, with a plethora of ridiculous coincidences and serial-like thrills and chills thrown in to pep up the story."
