= Elaine Trebek Kares =

American businesswoman

- Born: Elaine Howard; Columbus, Ohio, U.S.
- Education: Ohio State University
- Occupations: Broadcaster, businesswoman
- Spouses: Louis Callei (m. 1963; div. 1974); Alex Trebek (m. 1974; div. 1981); Peter Kares (m. 2001)
- Children: Nicky Trebek

Elaine Trebek Kares (née Howard, formerly Callei) is an American businesswoman and former broadcaster. She was a Playboy Bunny in the 1960s and a television broadcaster on the program Call Callei in the 1970s.

== Biography ==
Originally from Columbus, Ohio, and a journalism graduate of the Ohio State University, she was a Playboy Bunny in the 1960s under the pseudonym "Teddy Howard". With her first husband, Louis Callei, she later moved to Toronto, Ontario, Canada, where she ran her own promotion and party planning business before joining CHCH-TV in Hamilton as host of a daily talk show, Call Callei. The show was noted particularly for Callei's boundary-pushing interest in sexual topics; her 1972 interview with Xaviera Hollander led to a reprimand from the Canadian Radio-television and Telecommunications Commission in early 1973.

She left CHCH to take over as cohost of CTV's Canada AM in February 1973, after Carole Taylor left the program to join W5; however, she lasted only a few months before leaving the program by mutual agreement that she was not a good fit for a morning show, and was succeeded by Helen Hutchinson.

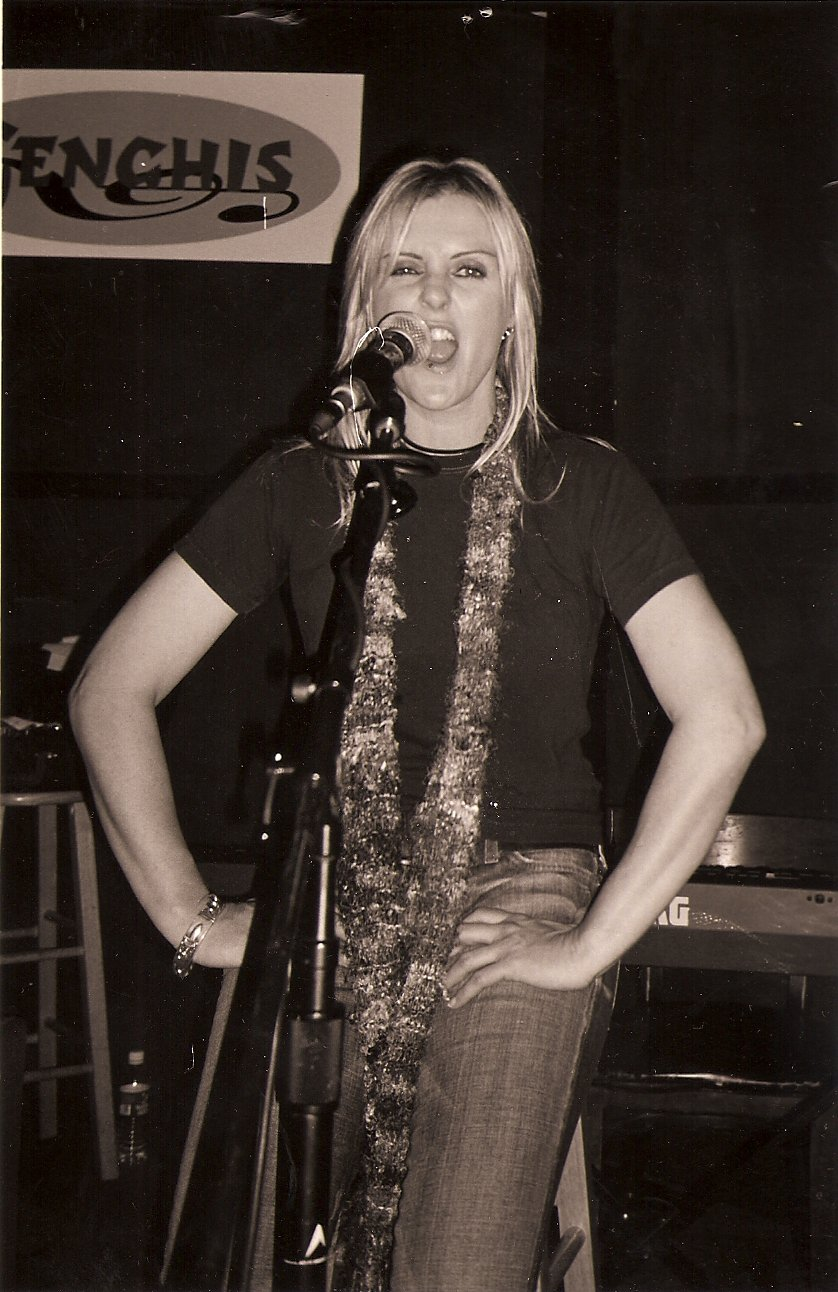
Elaine's daughter, Nicky, in 2005

She married Alex Trebek in 1974, returning to the United States as he pursued career opportunities there. They divorced amicably in 1981. She had no children with Trebek, although he became adoptive father to her daughter from her previous marriage.

She later remarried to film producer Peter Kares, and launched her own businesses, including Scent Seal, which created a new system for packaging perfume and fragrance samples, and Mag-a-Music, an early foray into multimedia music distribution.
