= Gail Scott =

Gail Scott may refer to:

- Gail Scott (journalist), a Canadian television news correspondent and anchor
- Gail Scott (writer), a Canadian novelist and poet
