= Rena Heer =

Canadian former television personality

- Born: Clearwater, British Columbia, Canada
- Education: B.A.
- Alma mater: Simon Fraser University
- Occupations: Journalist; News Anchor
- Years active: 2007-present
- Employer: Bell Media (2007–2017)
- Notable credit(s): CTV News Vancouver (2007–09); Canada AM (2008); CP24 (2009-2017)

Rena Heer is a Canadian former television personality who appeared on CTV's Canada AM program and on the Toronto-area news channel CP24.

== Biography ==
Heer was born and raised in Clearwater, British Columbia, Canada. She attended Simon Fraser University on a scholarship where she studied for her undergraduate degree in Communication studies. After completing her degree, she was hired by a local software company and spent the next five years in software business development, while contributing part-time to various local South Asian media. Translating her interpersonal skills, promotions and marketing experience as well as her experience with the South Asian community to the television industry, she took the role of community relations manager at Channel M upon the station's launch in late spring of 2003. While also at Channel M, she hosted the station's community segment, Channel M Preview, as well as a cooking show called Fusion Fare.

Heer left Channel M in September 2005 for a traffic reporter position at Global BC, which she left in December 7, 2007 to join CTV's Canada AM as a weather presenter for Western Canada. She also served as a reporter for CTV News at 6 at its Vancouver affiliate. From January 28, 2008 to June 6, 2008, she handled weather along with Jeff Hutcheson on what was a revamped version of the national Canada AM show. On June 6, 2008, CTV announced that it was cancelling the Vancouver portion of Canada AM.

Heer worked on CP24 as an anchor and reporter. She went on maternity leave in November 2010, and returned in April, 2011. She continued at CP24 until 2017 when she moved back to British Columbia.
