= Erin Bethea =

American actress

- Born: August 12, 1982 (age 44); Georgia, United States
- Occupation: Actress
- Spouse: Drew Waters
- Parent(s): Michael Catt (father); Terri Catt (mother)

Erin Bethea (born August 12, 1982) is an American actress. She is known for appearing in Sherwood Pictures' films, Facing the Giants (2006) and Fireproof (2008). She wrote, produced, and starred in the film New Life (2016), directed by her husband Drew Waters.

== Background ==
Bethea is the daughter of Michael Catt and Terri Catt. Her father, Dr. Michael Catt, was the senior pastor at Sherwood Baptist Church, which owns Sherwood Pictures. Her mother, Terri Catt, was the wardrobe coordinator for both Facing the Giants and Fireproof. Her sister, Hayley Catt, was a still photographer, production secretary, and website coordinator for Fireproof and Courageous.

In 2004, she received a Bachelor of Arts degree in Theatre at the University of Mobile.

On July 17, 2020, Bethea married Drew Waters, whom she met in 2013 on the set of The Redemption of Henry Myers.

== Filmography ==
Year	Film	Role
2006	Facing the Giants	Alicia Houston
2008	Fireproof	Catherine Holt
2011	The Heart of Christmas	Trish
2012	Amazing Love	Beth
2012	Laughing at the Moon	Natalie Maclay
2012	This Is Our Time	Alexandria Taylor
2014	The Redemption of Henry Myers	Marilyn
2014	Virtuous	Diane Landers
2014	Christian Mingle	Jennifer
2015	Grace of God	Julie
2015	New Life	Ava
2016	God's Compass	Debra Carr
2019	Sunrise in Heaven	Michele
2020	Miracle On Christmas	Mary Boyce

2020 / Fearless Faith / Lauren Miller
