= Beverly Thomson =

Canadian journalist (1964–2025)

Beverly Thomson CM
- Thomson during the 2016 United States presidential election
- Born: April 15, 1964; Toronto, Ontario, Canada
- Died: September 14, 2025 (aged 61)
- Education: York University; Seneca College
- Occupation: Journalist
- Known for: CTV News, Canada AM

Beverly Diane Thomson CM (April 15, 1964 – September 14, 2025) was a Canadian journalist and correspondent with CTV News Channel. Along with Seamus O'Regan, Thomson was co-host of Canada AM, CTV's former national morning show, from 2003 to 2016. In 2006, she received the Gemini Humanitarian Award.

== Early life and education ==
Beverly Diane Thomson was born on April 15, 1964, in Toronto, Ontario, and attended York University and Seneca College, where she majored in broadcast journalism. After graduating in 1987, she received the school's Distinguished Alumni Award in 2000, and the Ontario Premier's Award for Creative Arts & Design in 2003.

== Career ==
Upon graduating from Seneca College, Thomson worked at a Newmarket radio station and at CFTO in Toronto as an anchor on the weekend news program. She then moved to Global Television Network affiliate CIII as the anchor of both the 5:30 p.m. and 6:00 p.m from 1997 to 2003 weeknight news broadcasts. During this time, Thomson was diagnosed with breast cancer and became the subject of a documentary called There Is No Fear, focused on her recovery. In July 2003, she was chosen to replace Lisa LaFlamme on CTV Television Network's Canada AM, but was delayed due to a dispute between CTV and Global TV. Her former employer argued that Thomson had three years left on her exclusive contract but was able to settle out of court. Thomson debuted on Canada AM on November 3, 2003. Three years later, Thomson received the 2006 Gemini Humanitarian Award. In 2009, she was appointed by Tom McGrath as the first Canadian National Ambassador for The Duke of Edinburgh's Award.

While with CTV News, Thomson co-hosted their Olympic Morning program during the 2010 Winter Olympics and reported on the first inauguration of Barack Obama. After Canada AM was canceled in 2016, she continued with the network. In 2019, Thomson was appointed a Member of the Order of Canada for "outstanding contributions to Canada's broadcasting industry and volunteerism".

== Personal life and death ==
Thomson and her husband Rob Dale had two children together.

Upon her diagnosis with breast cancer, Thomson became an active figure with several Canadian charities. She was appointed the official spokesperson for the Ontario branch of the Canadian Breast Cancer Foundation, and received their Voice of the Foundation Award.

Thomson died from breast cancer on September 14, 2025, at age 61.
