= New Life (2016 film) =

- Film poster
- Directed by: Drew Waters
- Written by: Erin Bethea; Candice Irion; Josh Spake; Drew Waters
- Produced by: Erin Bethea; Jay Michaelson; Drew Waters; Jon Wroblewski
- Starring: Jonathan Patrick Moore; Erin Bethea; James Marsters; Bill Cobbs; Irma P. Hall; Terry O'Quinn
- Cinematography: Kristopher Kimlin
- Edited by: Blake Benton
- Music by: Mark Willard
- Production company: Drew Waters Films
- Distributed by: Argentum Entertainment
- Release date: October 28, 2016
- Running time: 89 minutes
- Country: United States
- Language: English

New Life is a 2016 American romantic drama film directed by Drew Waters and starring Jonathan Patrick Moore, Erin Bethea, James Marsters, Bill Cobbs, Irma P. Hall and Terry O'Quinn. It is Waters' directorial debut.

== Cast ==
- Jonathan Patrick Moore
- Erin Bethea
- James Marsters
- Bill Cobbs
- Irma P. Hall
- Terry O'Quinn
- Barry Corbin

== Release ==
The film was released in theaters on October 28, 2016. Then it was released on DVD and digital platforms in March 2017.

== Reception ==
The film has a 29% rating on Rotten Tomatoes. S. Jhoanna Robledo of Common Sense Media awarded the film two stars out of five.
