= The Heart of Christmas =

- DVD released cover
- Written by: Lance W. Dreesen
- Directed by: Gary Wheeler
- Starring: Candace Cameron Bure; Erin Bethea; Jeanne Neilson; Eric Jay Beck; George Newbern; Matthew West
- Music by: Matthew West
- Country of origin: United States
- Original language: English

Production
- Producers: Suzette Schafer; Charlie Schafer; Mark Burman
- Cinematography: Rob Givens
- Editor: Jonathan Olive
- Running time: 107 minutes
- Production companies: SlingShot Picture; My Three Sons Film

Original release
- Release: December 4, 2011

The Heart of Christmas is a 2011 American Christian drama film directed by Gary Wheeler. It stars Candace Cameron Bure, Erin Bethea, Jeanne Neilson, Eric Jay Beck, George Newbern, and Matthew West. Based on a true story, the film involves a woman's encounter with a family caring for a child with acute leukemia and how it transforms her faith and her attitude about her own family.

== Plot ==
Megan Walsh is a successful businesswoman who does not seem to have enough time for her husband and two children. While taking her children trick-or-treating during Halloween, she encounters a confusing situation in which many families are decorating for Christmas (which is nearly two months away). Their explanation is that they are trying to provide one last Christmas for Dax Locke, a toddler in their neighborhood who is dying of a rare form of leukemia. Curious, Megan reads Dax's mother Julie's blog and learns about the Lockes' journey. Inspired, Megan examines her own life and priorities.

== Cast ==
- Candace Cameron Bure as Megan Walsh
- Jeanne Neilson as Julie Locke
- Eric Jay Beck as Austin Locke
- Erin Bethea as Trish Hurtgren
- Matthew West as Mark Hurtgren
- Christopher Shone as Dax Locke
- George Newbern as Dr. Don Sandler
- Nicholas Shone as Dax Locke
- Dendrie Taylor as Michelle Denford
- Anita Renfroe as Theresa
- Burgess Jenkins as Walt Walsh
- Brooke Bryan as Emma Walsh
- Hayden & Christian Nelson as Jackson Walsh
- Bruce Marchiano as Dr. McDowell
- Magi Avila

== Reception ==
The film does not appear to have received reviews by any major professional film critics. Rotten Tomatoes has no rating for the movie. Scott Rolfe at The Dove Foundation website assigns the film 5 stars out of 5, although this may reflect its acceptability for the foundation's wholesomeness for family viewing.

== Release ==
It received a worldwide television premiere on December 4, 2012, on Gospel Music Channel (GMC).

== See also ==
- List of Christmas films
