= Institute for Research on Public Policy =

Canadian not-for-profit organization

- Abbreviation: IRPP
- Formation: 1972
- Type: Public policy think tank
- Headquarters: Montreal, Quebec
- President and CEO: Jennifer Ditchburn
- Chair of the Board of Directors: Elizabeth Roscoe
- Website: irpp.org

The Institute for Research on Public Policy (IRPP; French: Institut de recherche en politiques publiques) is an independent, national, bilingual, not-for-profit organization based in Montreal, Quebec. Its mission is to "improve public policy in Canada by generating research, providing insight and informing debate on current and emerging policy issues facing Canadians and their governments." It publishes peer-reviewed research and acts as a convenor of policy debates by organizing conferences, round tables and panel discussions among stakeholders, academics, policymakers and the general public. It is also the publisher of Policy Options magazine and the home of the Centre of Excellence on the Canadian Federation.

The institute's current research agenda focuses on several issues including Canadian federalism and intergovernmental affairs, affordability, income support, industrial policy, skills and training, and community transformations.

The IRPP was created as a result of a commitment the government of Prime Minister Pierre Elliot Trudeau made in a Speech from the Throne in 1968 to establish an "independent and autonomous" institute for public policy research, whose work would be "available to all governments.

The IRPP is financed by an endowment fund, to which federal and provincial governments and the private sector contributed in the early 1970s. The Institute is a registered charity under the Income Tax Act, and is incorporated under Part II of the Canada Corporations Act.

Elizabeth Roscoe is the current Chair of the Board of Directors and Jennifer Ditchburn is the current President and CEO.

== Purpose and mission ==
The IRPP's stated mission is to "improve public policy in Canada by generating research, providing insight and informing debate on current and emerging policy issues facing Canadians and their governments."

Although Prime Minister Trudeau's original proposal for the institute was as a resource to be drawn on by the federal and provincial governments, Ronald S. Ritchie – who accepted an invitation from the federal government to prepare a study on the concept – broadened this scope in a commissioned report published in 1969. Ritchie proposed that the IRPP should provide research and analysis "designed to improve the basis for informed choice and decisions by the public of Canada and its leaders on questions of public policy," and specified that "its intended audience should rather be opinion leaders, public servants and political leaders," and not only "academics."

The research agenda defined by its second president, Michael Kirby, aimed to conduct research "where existing policies were inadequate, where the need for change was recognized and where other institutions could not satisfy the need."

The IRPP's research is sometimes released with a direct aim of influencing policy-makers. For example, a September 2000 report titled Recommendations to First Ministers was issued a few days before the First Ministers' Meeting that year. This report was the product of an eight-person task force of expert practitioners and academics convened by the IRPP to advise on health care policy.

== Governance ==
The board of directors has 16 members, hailing from across Canada. Directors of the board are appointed by the members of the institute. Elizabeth Roscoe is board chair.

Past chairs of the board:

- Anne McClellan
- Graham W. S. Scott (2012–2018)
- Janice MacKinnon (2006–2012)
- Bob Rae (2001–2006)
- Peter White (1997–2001)
- Donald S. Macdonald (1992–1997)
- Roger Charbonneau (1988–1992)
- Robert Stanfield (1981–1988)
- John Aird (1974–1981)

Presidents are selected by the board of directors. Jennifer Ditchburn has been president and CEO since 2021.

Past presidents:

- Graham Fox (2011–2021)
- Mel Cappe (2006–2011)
- Hugh Segal (1999–2006)
- Monique Jérôme-Forget (1991–1998)
- Rod Dobell (1984–1991)
- Gordon Robertson (1980–1983)
- Michael Kirby (1977–1979)
- Fred Carrothers (1974–1976)

== Political orientation ==
The founding principles of the IRPP state that "the Institute should dedicate itself to impartial service of the national cultures, the various regions and the various governments of the people of Canada in its research and analysis on public policy questions." According to former acting secretary Peter Dobell, the IRPP's non-partisan position aims to "let the research speak for itself."

Hilary Clark of TVO's Inside Agenda blog places the IRPP in the political centre, while a report prepared by George Fetherling for the Sheldon Chumir Foundation for Ethics in Leadership describes the Institute as centre-right.

Academic Evert Lindquist describes the IRPP as "Canada's equivalent to the Brookings Institution." According to Lindquist, the Institute is generally perceived as a moderate supporter of the market system, free trade and limited government. However, the IRPP is often considered to be slightly to the left because of its links to prominent Liberals and the reformist views expressed in some of its publications.

Regarding the IRPP's plurality, Maclean’s and Globe and Mail journalist Mary Janigan has said that "the reason the IRPP is fabulous is that they allow every idea to enter the fray." The IRPP's board of directors and staff have had members with ties to all of the major Canadian political parties, and has had numerous unaffiliated members.

== Finances ==
The IRPP is financed by an endowment fund, to which federal and provincial governments and the private sector contributed in the early 1970s. This endowment fund was conceived with the goal of ensuring the institute's independence.

In addition to its endowment, the IRPP accepts donations from both public and private donors – to the extent that these donations do not come with conditions. The Institute strives to invest its own resources in all of its projects and to seek a diversity of donors, so that no single source of funding becomes indispensable. The IRPP's endowment fund is overseen by an investment committee and managed by professional investment firms. This committee advises the Board of Directors on investment strategies that aim to maintain the real value of the fund (after inflation).

== History ==
Following Prime Minister Pierre Elliot Trudeau’s commitment to establish the Institute, Ronald S. Ritchie was tasked to prepare a study in this direction. His report titled An Institute for Research on Public Policy was submitted to the federal government in December 1969. It touched on questions of financing, governance and the mission of the Institute. In addition, the report proposed the establishment of an endowment fund to ensure the Institute's independence. It also recommended that the Institute seek incorporation as a nonprofit corporation under the direction of a Board of Directors composed of "a small number of distinguished citizens."

In the spring of 1971, the Canadian government accepted the core ideas of Ritchie's report. Deputy Secretary of the Cabinet Michael Pitfield qualified Ritchie's proposal of an endowment by requiring a council of trustees to be established. This council of trustees, with about 50 members, would include a representative from each government in Canada, and would oversee the annual election of the board of directors and the governance of the institute.

The founding board of directors applied for incorporation on March 16, 1972, and the letters patent were approved on April 11. The founding Board of Directors was made up of J.V. Clyne (a Vancouver businessman), Louis Armand Desrochers (a lawyer from Edmonton), Louis Lorrain (a union executive from Montreal), Reverend Joseph MacNeil (bishop of Saint John), the Hon. John Robarts (former premier of Ontario), and Jeanne Sauvé (then a broadcaster in Montreal). Peter Dobell served as acting secretary, and Ron Ritchie was elected chair of the board.

== Policy Options ==
Policy Options is the digital magazine published by the IRPP. The first issue of Policy Options was published in March 1980 under the leadership of founding editor Tom Kent. In 2016 the magazine transitioned from a print to a digital publication.

Policy Options features daily articles on issues of public policy by English- and French-language contributors from academia, research institutions, the political world, the public service and the nonprofit and private sectors. Its stated goal is to provide a window into some of the discussions that key decision-makers are having or should be having, and to feature a diversity of viewpoints. The magazine also has a biweekly podcast, called the Policy Options Podcast. The magazine also features reports, such as the March 2024 report assessing Canada's response to the COVID-19 pandemic.

In 2017 Policy Options regular contributor Tim Caulfield received gold in the Digital Publishing Awards’ Best Blog or Online-Only Column category for his column The Cure. Policy Options was also a silver medalist in the 2017, 2018 and 2019 Canadian Online Publishing Awards, in the categories for best blog/column and best podcast.

Les Perreaux is the current editor-in-chief of Policy Options. He began his post in 2021.

Previous editors of the magazine:

- Jennifer Ditchburn (2016–21)
- Dan Gardner (2015–16)
- Bruce Wallace (2012–14)
- L. Ian MacDonald (2002–12)
- William Watson (1999-2002)
- Alfred Leblanc (1994–98)
- Mathew Horsman (1991–93)
- Walter Stewart (1987–90)
- Thomas Worrall Kent (1980–87)

== Centre of Excellence on the Canadian Federation ==
In 2020, the Institute launched its Centre of Excellence on the Canadian Federation, a permanent research body “that will build a deeper understanding of Canada as a federal community,” led by Charles Breton. It is financed by a $10 million commitment from the Government of Canada.
