= Norm Perry (journalist) =

Canadian broadcast journalist

Norm Perry is a Canadian retired broadcast journalist and television presenter. He is best known as the longest-serving male co-host of the CTV morning program Canada AM, appearing on the program from 1974 until 1990. Earlier in his career, he hosted the investigative television series Perry's Probe. After leaving Canada AM, Perry worked for CBC Newsworld.

== Career ==
=== Radio and early television work ===
Perry began his broadcasting career in the late 1950s as a reporter and interviewer at Ottawa radio station CKOY, then a CBC Radio affiliate. Some of his reports were subsequently carried by the national CBC network, including on the radio program Assignment. By the early 1960s, he was working for CBC in Toronto.

In the mid-1960s, Perry joined Toronto radio station CKEY. He later moved to CFTO-TV, where he worked as a newsman and interviewer and hosted several programs.

In 1968, Perry became the presenter of Perry's Probe, a half-hour investigative journalism and interview program. The series originated as a local CFTO production before being carried nationally by the CTV Television Network. It aired on weekday afternoons during the 1968–69 television season and was cancelled after one season.

=== Canada AM ===
Perry joined CTV's national morning program Canada AM in 1974. He became one of the program's principal interviewers and remained a co-host until 1990, making him the longest-serving male co-host in the program's history.

During his tenure, Perry worked alongside a succession of co-hosts, including Helen Hutchinson, Gail Scott, Pamela Wallin, Linda MacLennan, Nancy Wilson and Deborah McGregor. Perry and Wallin also presented the program from Beijing in 1984, shortly before an official visit to Canada by Chinese premier Zhao Ziyang.

The program combined news, weather, current-affairs interviews and lifestyle segments. During Perry's years as host, its broadcast was expanded from its original 90-minute format to a two-and-a-half-hour weekday program beginning at 6:30 a.m. Perry conducted thousands of interviews during his time on the program, speaking with political figures, entertainers and other newsmakers. Among the program's location broadcasts was a July 1976 edition presented by Perry from the top of the newly completed CN Tower.

Perry left Canada AM in 1990 and was succeeded by J. D. Roberts. In 2012, television critic Bill Brioux credited Perry with helping establish the program's national profile, writing that he had “put the show on the map”.

=== CBC Newsworld ===
After leaving CTV, Perry joined CBC Newsworld, where he worked from the network's Calgary production centre. He hosted and moderated news and current-affairs programming, including the interview program The Lead. His work for Newsworld continued into at least the mid-1990s.

== Awards ==
At the 5th Gemini Awards in 1990, Perry won the Gemini Award for Best Anchor or Interviewer for his work on Canada AM.
