= Nancy Regan =

Canadian actress, journalist, and news anchor

- Born: Nancy Margaret Regan; March 20, 1966 (age 60); Halifax, Nova Scotia, Canada
- Education: BA (1988), St. Francis Xavier University
- Occupations: Journalist; news anchor; television personality
- Spouse: Geoff Machum (1994–2003) David Graham (circa 2005)
- Children: Andrew and Matthew Machum, Alexandra Graham
- Family: John Harrison (Grandfather); Gerald Regan (father); Geoff Regan (brother); Laura Regan (sister); Kelly Regan (sister in law); Farhad Safinia (brother in law)
- Website: nancyregan.ca

Nancy Margaret Regan (born March 20, 1966) is a Canadian actress, journalist, news anchor, and television personality, most known for her fifteen-year tenure as host of CTV's Live at 5, a live news and general interest television program reaching more than a quarter of a million viewers nightly.

She is the daughter of Anita Carole Thomas (née Harrison) and former Nova Scotia Premier Gerald Regan, and the sister of both actress Laura Regan, and former Nova Scotia Liberal MP (and former House of Commons Speaker) Geoff Regan. Her maternal grandfather, John Harrison, was a Liberal MP for Meadow Lake in Saskatchewan. She is married to David Graham, son of former Liberal Senator (The Highlands, Alasdair Graham (1928–2015). They have one daughter, Alexandra.

She has also hosted CTV’s national weekend morning show Good Morning Canada and That News Show on TVTropolis.

She was crowned Miss Nova Scotia in 1986 and attended Miss Canada 1987.
