= Canada AM =

Defunct Canadian morning news program

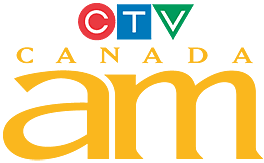
- Presented by: Beverly Thomson (2003–2016); Jeff Hutcheson (1998–2016); Marci Ien (2003–2016)
- Country of origin: Canada
- No. of episodes: Daily

Production
- Production locations: Toronto (1972–2016); Vancouver (2008)
- Running time: 3 hours

Original release
- Network: CTV
- Release: September 11, 1972 – June 3, 2016

Related
- Your Morning; Good Morning Canada

Canada AM is a Canadian morning television news show that aired on CTV from 1972 to 2016. Its final hosts were Beverly Thomson and Marci Ien, with Jeff Hutcheson presenting the weather forecast and sports. The program aired on weekdays, and was produced from CTV's facilities at 9 Channel Nine Court in Scarborough, Toronto.

In addition to CTV's local owned-and-operated stations (O&Os) in Eastern Canada as well as affiliate station CITL-DT Lloydminster, the program also aired on independent station CJON-DT (NTV) in St. John's, Newfoundland and Labrador, as well as CTV News Channel, the network's 24-hour national news service. The program previously aired on CTV's O&Os in Western Canada, until they launched their own all-local morning news programmes called CTV Morning Live on August 29, 2011.

== History ==
CTV's first attempt at a morning show, Bright and Early, launched in 1966 and was cancelled the next year; among the presenter lineup was future federal Liberal cabinet minister Jim Fleming, who read the news headlines.

Ray Peters, the head of Vancouver's CTV affiliate CHAN-TV, had been an avid viewer of NBC's Today Show, and lobbied CTV to reinstate a morning program in order to compete with the American networks. Peters had intended the show to be produced out of Vancouver, but agreed to a Toronto-based production in order to bring CFTO-TV's owner John W. H. Bassett on board. The 90-minute program launched under the title Canada AM on September 11, 1972, with Carole Taylor and Percy Saltzman as hosts, and Dennis McIntosh as newsreader. Taylor left the show in 1973 to host W5, and was succeeded by Elaine Callei; however, Callei left the program within a few months, and was in turn succeeded by Helen Hutchinson, who for a time hosted concurrently with her tenure as co-host of the evening newsmagazine series, W5. Long-time host Norm Perry joined in 1975 and would remain with the programme until 1990, making him the longest-running co-host in the show's history.

=== Prior to 2008 ===
For most of the 1990s and 2000s, Canada AM had a consistent running time of two and a half hours, airing between 6:30 and 9:00 a.m. local time, with most affiliates repeating the previous night's late local news at 6:00 a.m. As the program is produced live for the Eastern Time Zone, the program would be "delayed" in Atlantic Canada to 7:30–10:00 AT / 8:00–10:30 NT.

The first half-hour would typically consist of a rundown of news headlines, sports, and weather, followed by a lengthy business news segment produced by Business News Network; for a few years the 6:30 half-hour was in fact a semi-autonomous program known as AM Business. From 7:00 on, the program used a format more in line with its U.S. counterparts. In its final seasons as CTV's Vancouver affiliate, CHAN-TV (known on air as BCTV) would pre-empt the first 30 minutes in favour of its own morning newscast, and eventually delayed the remainder of Canada AM by an hour, i.e. 8 to 10 a.m. (it did not carry the additional hour discussed below).

The program also includes opt-outs for news updates from a local anchor at each station at the end of each half-hour. The network would always produce an alternate national segment for stations not using the opt-outs, as well as CTV News Channel.

In fall 2000, CTV decided to match NBC's expansion of Today by adding another hour of Canada AM from 9:00 to 10:00 a.m. local, which aired on O&Os and some affiliates. This would include a "coffee talk" segment as well as other lifestyle features. As a result, CTV dropped the recently renamed Live with Regis and Kelly. As Live continued to have strong ratings stateside, the Canadian network re-added the talk show in fall 2001, bumping the "coffee talk" hour to 10:00 a.m. in most areas, before abandoning the final hour entirely later in the season.

During the early to mid-1990s, Canada AM also aired a one-hour weekend edition, although this was essentially a "best-of" package of that week's regular shows. Another weekend program, Good Morning Canada, was launched in the early 2000s but was also pre-taped using segments from local stations; it was cancelled in 2009.

Canada AM underwent a format change on January 28, 2008, which saw the show expand to six hours of live programming between 6 a.m. and noon ET every weekday. Local CTV stations across the country aired Canada AM live between 6 and 9 a.m. local time (7 and 10 a.m. Atlantic Time, 7:30 and 10:30 a.m. Newfoundland Time), while the complete six-hour, live edition aired on CTV Newsnet. Between 6:00 and 6:30 am ET was Early Edition, originally aired only in the Eastern, Atlantic and Newfoundland time zones, while it still aired on CTV Newsnet.

The format change was marked by the addition of a second on-air team from CTV British Columbia in Western Canada, consisting of host Mi-Jung Lee and weather presenter Rena Heer in Vancouver, and news anchor Omar Sachedina in Toronto. The shift from the Eastern to Western hosting teams took place at 7 a.m. PT (10 a.m. ET), meaning that only viewers in Alberta, British Columbia and part of Saskatchewan saw the western team on their local CTV station, although all other Canadians could watch the western team on CTV Newsnet or out-of-market CTV stations carried by cable providers.

On June 6, 2008, CKNW in Vancouver reported the cancellation of the Vancouver-based portions of Canada AM. Biographies of Mi-Jung Lee and Rena Heer were taken off the show's website the same day. CTV announced that it would revert to the program's original format (the additional 6:00-6:30 half-hour will continue as well), stating that the decision was in response to viewer feedback from western Canada indicating a preference for the prior format.

A few weeks prior, CTV cancelled the extra local news segments that appeared at :00 and :30 minutes past the hour, reverting to updates only at :25 and :55 minutes past the hour.

Following the cancellation of the western edition, CTV continued to produce the 9:00 ET hour of Canada AM until September 2008. During those three months, CTV Newsnet aired 4 hours of Canada AM from 6:00-10:00 ET (3:00-7:00 PT), and 2 hours of its own news content from 10:00 a.m. to noon ET to replace the cancelled western edition. CTV British Columbia also reverted to its original local updates (until they were cancelled in March 2009).

The 9:00 ET hour of Canada AM was handled differently on the main network depending on the time zone:

- Eastern, Atlantic and Newfoundland Time Zone viewers did not notice a schedule difference at all because the 9:00 ET edition was only available on cable.
- Pacific Time Zone viewers were able to see the second and third hour of the eastern edition, but the first hour was preempted with the live 9:00 ET edition at 6:00 PT. The first hour of the eastern edition could only be viewed on CTV Newsnet between 3:00-4:00 a.m. PT.

After the 9:00 ET hour of Canada AM was cancelled, CTV Newsnet (later rebranded as CTV News Channel) began airing an extra hour of its own news content, presented by Marci Ien. From that point onward, the program aired without deviations in every time zone, including Early Edition at 6:00 AM.

=== 2009 to 2016 ===
In March 2009, CTV stopped producing local opt-out news updates in most markets in order to reduce costs at its local stations. The two exceptions are CTV Toronto (where Canada AM is produced) and CTV Atlantic (which reuses the staff already on hand for sister channel CTV Two Atlantic's morning show). Private affiliate NTV also continues to utilize the opt-out for local news updates.

As part of Bell Canada's re-acquisition of CTV in 2011, CTV's new owner Bell Media announced the launch of new all-local morning newscasts (titled CTV Morning Live) to be produced at the network's stations in Winnipeg, Regina, Saskatoon, Edmonton, Calgary, and Vancouver effective fall 2011. (In the latter three markets, local morning newscasts on Global stations usually had higher ratings than Canada AM at that point.) As a result, Canada AM no longer aired on CTV's owned-and-operated stations in Western Canada, and is instead available only via CTV News Channel, or out-of-market CTV stations from Lloydminster or Eastern Canada.

The new programs complement existing local morning shows produced under the Bell Media corporate umbrella in Eastern Canada, namely CP24 Breakfast in Toronto, and CTV Morning Live in Ottawa and Atlantic Canada. However, the existing programs did not replace Canada AM on the CTV stations in their respective markets; instead, they air on co-owned local outlets (CP24, CTV Two Ottawa and CTV Two Atlantic respectively) in competition with the national show.

Seamus O'Regan left the show on November 24, 2011 to become a correspondent for CTV National News. Marci Ien took over as co-host upon returning from maternity leave on January 9, 2012. No replacement for Ien's previous position as newsreader was named, and the duty of reading the news headlines at the top of each half-hour alternated between Thomson and Ien.

On June 2, 2016, after nearly 44 years on the air, CTV announced that Canada AM had been cancelled, and would air a series finale the next day. The following Monday, June 6, the program's replacement, Your Morning, was announced. Since its premiere on August 22, 2016, it has been hosted by Anne-Marie Mediwake and Ben Mulroney.

Ien soon joined The Social as a substitute cohost after Traci Melchor took a leave of absence, and would become permanent cohost of the show in 2017, remaining in that position until 2020, while Beverly Thomson became a correspondent for CTV News Channel. Jeff Hutcheson had already announced plans to retire.

== Theme music ==
For several years, in the 1970s and 1980s, the theme music was an instrumental version of The Moody Blues' "Ride My See-Saw", which was recorded by Ronnie Aldrich and the London Festival Orchestra; by the mid-1980s "Ride My See-Saw" remained the theme music of Canada AM, but an orchestral version was used rather than Aldrich's. During the same era, CTV's newsmagazine series W5 was using Supertramp's "Fool's Overture".

== Personalities ==
=== Hosts ===
- Percy Saltzman & Carole Taylor: 1972–1973
- Percy Saltzman & Elaine Callei: 1973–1973
- Percy Saltzman & Helen Hutchinson: 1973–1974
- Pierre Pascau & Helen Hutchinson: 1974–1975
- Norm Perry & Helen Hutchinson: 1975–1978
- Norm Perry & Gail Scott: 1978–1981
- Norm Perry & Pamela Wallin: 1981–1985
- Norm Perry & Linda MacLennan: 1985–1987
- Norm Perry & Nancy Wilson: 1987–1989
- Norm Perry & Deborah McGregor: 1989–1990
- J.D. Roberts & Deborah McGregor 1990–1991
- J.D. Roberts & Pamela Wallin: 1991–1992
- Keith Morrison & Pamela Wallin: 1992–1992
- Keith Morrison & Valerie Pringle: 1992–1994
- Dan Matheson & Valerie Pringle: 1995–2001
- Lisa LaFlamme & Rod Black: 2001–2002
- Lisa LaFlamme & Seamus O'Regan: 2002–2003
- Seamus O'Regan & Beverly Thomson: 2003–2011
- Beverly Thomson & Marci Ien: 2011–2016

=== Weather/sports anchor ===
- Percy Saltzman: 1972–1974
- Wally Macht: 1977–1987
- Dan Matheson: 1987–1995
- Rod Black: 1995–1997
- Jeff Hutcheson: 1998–2016

=== News anchor ===
- Dennis McIntosh: 1972–1977
- Wally Macht: 1977–1980
- Sandie Rinaldo: 1980–1985
- Tom Clark: 1986–1987
- Terrilyn Joe: 1987–1992
- Thalia Assuras: 1992–1993
- Wei Chen: 1993–1998
- Leslie Jones: 1998–2003
- Marci Ien: 2003–2011

== See also ==
- CTV News
