= Jessica Lynch =

American Army veteran, teacher and actress (born 1983)

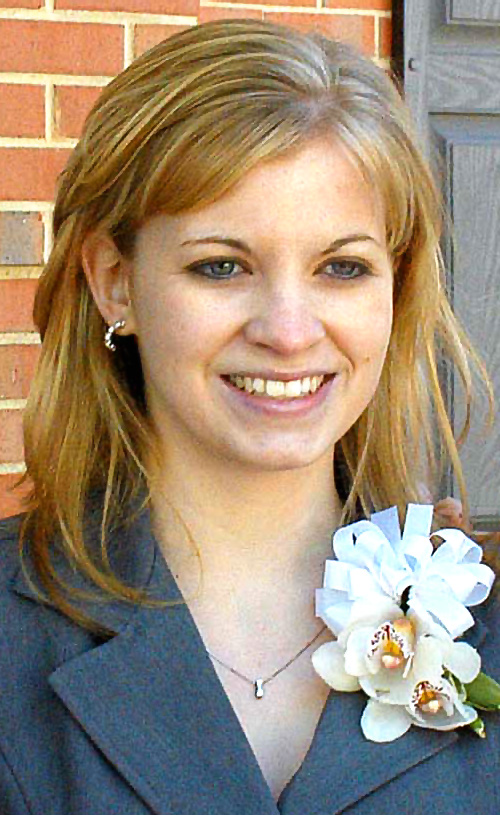
- Lynch at the Walter Reed Army Medical Center in Washington D.C., on April 28, 2004
- Born: April 26, 1983 (age 43); Palestine, West Virginia, United States
- Military career
- Allegiance: United States
- Branch: United States Army
- Service years: 2001–2003
- Rank: Private first class
- Units: 507th Maintenance Company
- Conflicts: Iraq War; Invasion of Iraq (POW)
- Awards: Bronze Star Medal; Purple Heart; Prisoner of War Medal
- Other work: Teacher, actress

Jessica Dawn Lynch (born April 26, 1983) is an American teacher, actress, and former United States Army soldier who served in the 2003 invasion of Iraq as a private first class.

On March 23, 2003, she was serving as a unit supply specialist with the 507th Maintenance Company when her convoy was ambushed by Iraqi troops during the Battle of Nasiriyah; Lynch was seriously injured during the offensive and captured by Iraqi soldiers shortly afterwards. Her subsequent recovery by U.S. special operations forces on April 1, 2003, received considerable media coverage as it was the first successful rescue of an American prisoner of war since World War II and the first ever of a woman.

Initial official reports on Lynch's capture and rescue in Iraq were incorrect. On April 24, 2007, she testified in front of United States Congress that she had never fired her weapon (her M16 rifle reportedly having jammed), and that she had been knocked unconscious when her vehicle crashed during the ambush. Lynch has been outspoken in her criticism of the original stories that were reported regarding her combat experience. When asked about her heroine status, she stated: "That wasn't me. I'm not about to take credit for something I didn't do... I'm just a survivor."

In 2014, Lynch made her acting debut as specialist Summer L. Gabriel in the 2014 film Virtuous. Her role was loosely based on her own experiences during the U.S.-led invasion of Iraq in 2003.

== Early life ==
Lynch was born on April 26, 1983 in Palestine, West Virginia, the second child and first daughter to Deidre Lynch and Gregory Lynch, Sr. Her family could not afford to send her to college; her older brother had to drop out for financial reasons as well. Searching for a way to pay for the children's education, the Lynch family met with an army recruiter in the summer of 2000 when Lynch was seventeen and still in high school. "He did not lie to the kids," her mother said, "he said there was always the possibility of war in the future." "But at that time it was before September 11, and there was no terrorism," Lynch recalls, "so we were like, 'that would never happen to me.' " On September 19, 2001, Lynch entered basic training at Fort Jackson, South Carolina. She later completed Advanced Individual Training for her Military Occupational Specialty as a unit supply specialist (MOS 92Y) in the Quartermaster Corps at Fort Lee, Virginia.

== Military career ==
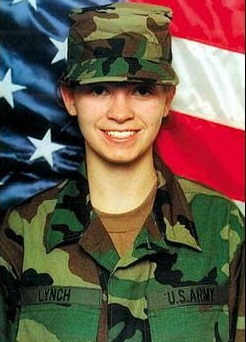
Private First Class Jessica Lynch

=== Battle of Nasiriyah ===
On March 23, 2003, a convoy of the United States Army's 507th Maintenance Company and the 3rd Combat Support Battalion elements, led by a Humvee driven by Lori Piestewa, was heading towards Baghdad. Several vehicles experienced mechanical problems, and the company fell hours behind. As a result, the company missed a turn and headed into territory controlled by Iraqi forces near Al Nasiriyah, a major crossing point over the Euphrates northwest of Basra.

Lynch, then a supply clerk with the 507th Maintenance Company from Fort Bliss, Texas, was wounded and captured by Iraqi forces. She was initially listed as missing in action. Eleven other soldiers in the company were killed in the ambush. Five other soldiers were captured and subsequently rescued 21 days later. Lynch's best friend, Lori Piestewa, received a serious head wound and died in an Iraqi civilian hospital.

A video of some of the American prisoners of war, including Piestewa, was later shown around the world on Al Jazeera television. Later, footage was discovered of both Lynch and Piestewa at an Iraqi hospital before the latter died.

=== Prisoner of war ===
After some time in the custody of the Iraqi army regiment that had captured her, Lynch was taken to a hospital in Nasiriyah. US forces were tipped off as to Lynch's whereabouts by an Iraqi, who told them she had been tortured and injured but was still alive. The Iraqi was described as a 32-year-old lawyer, initially described only as "Mohammed" and later identified as Mohammed Odeh al Rehaief. In light of Mohammed's role in Lynch's rescue, he and his family were granted asylum by the United States.

Initial reports indicated that al Rehaief's wife was a nurse in the hospital where Lynch was being held captive, and that while visiting his wife at the hospital, al Rehaief noticed that security was heightened and inquired as to why. However, hospital personnel later confirmed only part of al Rehaief's story, indicating that while al Rehaief had indeed visited the hospital, his wife was not a nurse there. While visiting the hospital from which Lynch was eventually extracted, al Rehaief also claimed that he had observed an Iraqi colonel slapping Lynch. "My heart stopped", said al Rehaief, "I knew then I must help her be saved. I decided I must go to tell the Americans."

Al Rehaief's story has been disputed by doctors working at the hospital, who say that Lynch was shielded and protected from Iraqi military personnel by hospital staff and was treated well throughout her stay at the hospital. Lynch's own story concurs with these accounts, saying that she was treated humanely, with a nurse even singing to her.

Moreover, according to reports, on March 30, Harith Al-Houssona, a doctor in the Nasiriyah hospital, reportedly attempted to have Lynch delivered to the U.S. forces, an attempt which had to be abandoned when the Americans fired on the Iraqi ambulance carrying her.

According to al Rehaief's version of the events leading up to Lynch's rescue, he walked six miles to a US Marine checkpoint to inform American forces that he knew where Lynch was being held. After talking with the Marines, al Rehaief was then sent back to the hospital to gather more information, which was used to plan Lynch's rescue. Allegedly, al Rehaief returned to the checkpoint with five different maps of the hospital and the details of the security layout, reaction plan, and shift changes.

The US military reportedly learned of Lynch's location from several informants, one of whom was al Rehaief.

=== Hospital retrieval ===
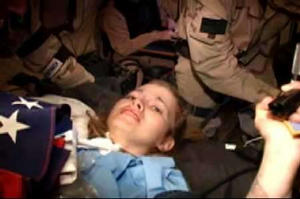
A combat camera video shows the April 1, 2003, footage of Lynch on a stretcher during the rescue in Iraq.

On April 1, 2003, U.S. Marines from 3rd Battalion 4th Marines, 2nd Battalion 8th Marines and 2nd Battalion 1st Marines, as well as members from the Navy SEALs under the command of the U.S. Army, staged a diversionary attack, besieging nearby Iraqi irregulars to draw them away from Saddam Hospital (now named the Imam Hussein Teaching Hospital) in Nasiriyah. Meanwhile, an element from the Joint Special Operations Task Force 121 composed of U.S. Army Special Forces (Green Berets), Air Force Pararescuemen (PJs), Army Rangers, 160th Special Operations Aviation Regiment (Airborne) and Delta Force launched a nighttime raid on the hospital, and successfully retrieved Lynch and the bodies of eight other American soldiers.

According to certain accounts of doctors present during the raid, they were gathered into groups at gunpoint and treated as possible hostiles until they could be identified as being hospital staff. Many military and Special Operations Forces experts have defended the tactics of the operators who led the raid, saying that Special Operations Forces teams are trained to expect the worst and move quickly, initially treating each person they encounter as a possible threat. Additionally, the doctors stated that the Iraqi military had left the hospital the day before, and that no one in the hospital had offered any resistance to the American forces during the raid.

One witness account claimed that the Special Operations Forces had foreknowledge that the Iraqi military had fled a day before they raided the hospital, and that the entire event was staged, even going so far as to use blanks to create the appearance that they were firing. The use of blanks was disputed by weapons experts who pointed out that there was no sign of blank adapters being used on the weapons of those who appeared in the video of the raid.

In the initial press briefing on April 2, 2003, the Pentagon released a five-minute video of the rescue and claimed that Lynch had stab and bullet wounds, and that she had been slapped while on her hospital bed and interrogated.

Iraqi doctors and nurses later interviewed, including Al-Houssona, described Lynch's injuries as "a broken arm, a broken thigh, and a dislocated ankle". According to Al-Houssona, there was no sign of gunshot or stab wounds, and Lynch's injuries were consistent with those that would be suffered in a car accident.

US Army medical reports later indicated that Lynch had been raped during the first three hours of her captivity, while she was unconscious. The authorized biography, I Am a Soldier Too: The Jessica Lynch Story, by Pulitzer Prize-winning journalist Rick Bragg describes Lynch as being sodomized during captivity, although the Iraqi doctors who rescued and treated her denied that they had found evidence of sexual assault.

Аlthough articles, citing medical records and the nature of Lynch’s injuries, claim that Lynch was raped while in captivity, Lynch herself says that she does not remember any sexual assault. She was categorically against mentioning the rape in the book, but Rick Bragg insisted, arguing that "people need to know what can happen to female soldiers in war."

=== Departure from Iraq ===
From Kuwait, Lynch was transported to Landstuhl Regional Medical Center, Germany, where she was expected to recover fully from her injuries. On the flight to Ramstein Air Base in Germany, the military medics kept her sedated and hydrated. Her family flew to Germany on April 5 to be reunited with her. In a statement, the hospital said, "Lynch had a big smile on her face when her parents arrived."

Lynch underwent back surgery on April 3 to correct a vertebra that was putting pressure on her spinal cord. Since then, she has undergone several more surgeries to stabilize her fractures.

Eleven bodies were recovered at the same time of Lynch's rescue, nine from a shallow gravesite and two from the morgue. Following forensic identification, eight were identified as fellow members of her company, including Private First Class Lori Piestewa. All were subsequently given posthumous Purple Hearts. Details of their deaths are unclear.

Lynch was shown during a controversial display on Al Jazeera television of four other supply-unit POWs. That video also showed a number of dead soldiers from that unit with gunshot wounds to the forehead.

After learning of Mohammed Odeh al-Rehaief's role in Lynch's rescue, Friends of Mohammed, a group based in Malden, West Virginia, was formed to press for al Rehaief to be naturalized as a U.S. citizen and to bring him to West Virginia. On April 29, 2003, Secretary of Homeland Security Tom Ridge announced that Mohammed Odeh al Rehaief, his wife, and their five-year-old daughter had been granted humanitarian asylum on April 28. Al Rehaief and his family were brought to the United States at his request April 10. Al Rehaief published a book, Because Each Life Is Precious in October 2003, for a reported US$150,000. He now works in the U.S.

=== Return home ===
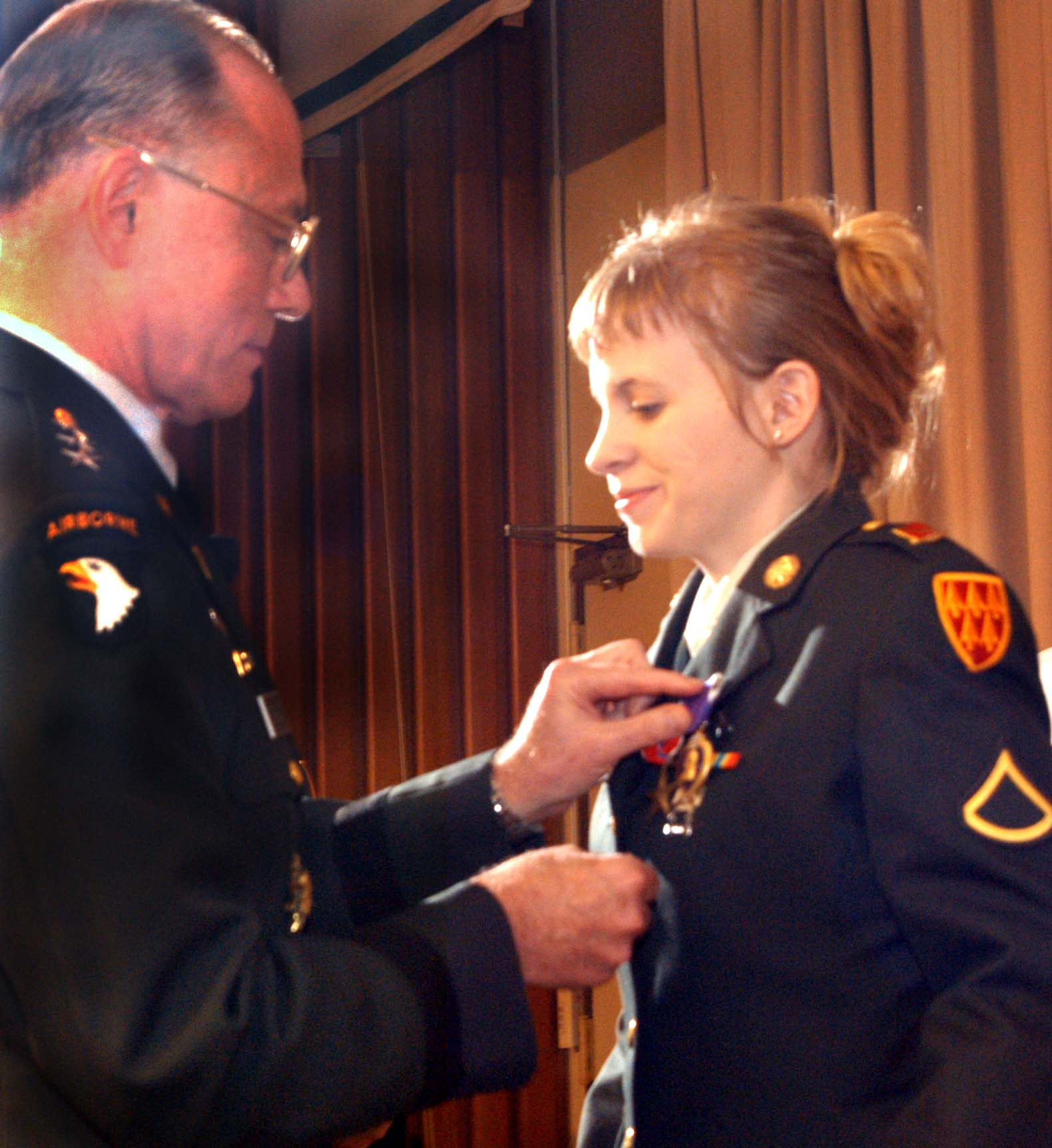
Jessica Lynch is awarded the Bronze Star, Prisoner of War, and Purple Heart medals on July 22, 2003

Upon her return she was greeted by thousands of West Virginia residents including her then-boyfriend, Army Sergeant Ruben Contreras. Lynch and Contreras became engaged after her return but later separated.

On April 12, 2003, Lynch was flown to the Walter Reed Army Medical Center in Washington, D.C., to undergo specialized treatment and rehabilitation. On April 17, she underwent surgery to repair a bone in her right foot.

While recovering in Washington, Lynch was inundated with gifts and flowers from well-wishers, so much so that she asked the public to send cards instead. Her family suggested that the public send money to charity and relief organizations.

Lynch was released from the hospital on July 22, 2003, more than three months after the attack that hospitalized her.

On August 27, 2003, Lynch was given an honorable discharge.

== Awards and decorations ==

| Bronze Star | Purple Heart | Prisoner of War Medal |
| National Defense; Service Medal | Global War on Terrorism; Expeditionary Medal | Army Service Ribbon |

== Controversy regarding coverage ==
Lynch blamed the U.S. government for embellishing the story as part of the Pentagon's propaganda effort.

Soon after Lynch was rescued, Pentagon officials disputed a report appearing in The Washington Post that Lynch had fought back, and the first official report of Lynch's actions during her capture released by the Pentagon weeks later said that she did not appear to have fought back against her captors, in contradiction of earlier Pentagon press releases. According to one former Pentagon official, the stories of her supposed heroics that day were spread by the news media, and congressmen from West Virginia were instrumental in pushing the Pentagon to award her honors based on reports of her actions during her capture.

Months after returning, Lynch finally began speaking to the public. Her statements tended to be sharply critical of the original story that was reported by The Washington Post. When asked about her heroine status, "That wasn't me. I'm not about to take credit for something I didn't do ... I'm just a survivor."

Despite the letters of support she received after her testimony before the United States House Committee on Oversight and Accountability, Lynch says that she still receives hate mail from Americans who accuse her of making up the heroic acts attributed to her. "I was captured, but then I was OK and I didn't go down fighting. OK, so what?" she says. "It was really hard to convince people that I didn't have to do any of that. That I was injured, that I still needed comfort."

She did not claim that she fought until being wounded, but she did say her weapon jammed immediately and that she could not have done anything anyway. Interviewed by Diane Sawyer, Lynch claimed, concerning the media and the Pentagon: "They used me to symbolize all this stuff. It's wrong. I don't know why they filmed [the rescue mission] or why they say these things." She also stated "I did not shoot, not a round, nothing. I went down praying to my knees. And that's the last I remember."

Critics have also accused the media of bias in the coverage of Lynch versus that of her fellow soldiers, Shoshana Johnson and Lori Piestewa. All three were ambushed in the same attack during the Iraq War on March 23, 2003, with Piestewa being killed and Lynch and Johnson being injured and taken prisoner.

=== Congressional hearings ===
On April 24, 2007, Lynch gave congressional testimony before the United States House Committee on Oversight and Government Reform that the Pentagon had erroneously portrayed her as a "Rambo from the hills of West Virginia" when, in fact, she never fired a shot after her truck was ambushed.

She began her testimony by noting for the record that her appearance was not politically motivated. In a prepared statement, she said:

- I believe this is not a time for finger pointing. It is time for the truth, the whole truth, versus hype and misinformation.
- I am still confused as to why they chose to lie and tried to make me a legend when the real heroics of my fellow soldiers that day were, in fact, legendary. People like Lori Piestewa and First Sergeant Dowdy who picked up fellow soldiers in harm's way. Or people like Patrick Miller and Sergeant Donald Walters who actually fought until the very end. The bottom line is the American people are capable of determining their own ideals of heroes and they don't need to be told elaborate tales.
- The truth of war is not always easy to hear but it is always more heroic than the hype.

== Later life ==
Lynch attended West Virginia University at Parkersburg on a full scholarship because of her military service. She graduated with her Bachelor of Arts Degree in Elementary Education K-6 on December 16, 2011, after completing her student-teacher training at the same elementary school she had attended, in Wirt County, West Virginia. She had joined the U.S. Army at 18 in order to "earn money for college and become a school teacher".

On May 6, 2006, Allison Barker of the Associated Press reported that Lynch, who had completed her freshman year, avoided talking about her military service at school, despite wearing a brace on her left foot protecting nerve damage from her capture: "I think people recognize who I am; they just don't make it obvious. That's good for me because it gives me the opportunity to blend in and not stick out and really experience the college life, just like they are." Lynch also talked about her career plans and legacy: "I know I want to do something with children. [But] I haven't really found my direction, with everything I've been through ... I want people to remember me as being a soldier who went over there and did my job. Nothing special. I'm just a country girl at heart."

On August 24, 2006, Good Morning America Weekend Edition co-anchor Kate Snow reported that Lynch wrote a letter stating she would have a baby by the end of the year. Fox News reported that Lynch and her then-boyfriend Wes Robinson would have their first child in January. She made the statement: "I was not sure if this could ever happen for me, learning to walk again and coping with the internal injuries that I still deal with pale in comparison to the tremendous joy of carrying this child." She gave birth on January 19, 2007, through a caesarean section, and named her daughter "Dakota Ann" after her fallen friend, Lori Ann Piestewa, the first woman of the U.S.-led Coalition killed in the Iraq War and the first Native American woman killed on foreign soil in an American war.

As of 2015, Lynch worked occasionally as a substitute teacher and made her living as a motivational speaker. She suffered from post-traumatic stress disorder.

As of 2018, Lynch was a 5th grade teacher in West Virginia.

== Filmography ==
Film roles
| Year | Title | Role | Notes |
|---|---|---|---|
| 2014 | Virtuous | Military Meeting Specialist | |
| 2015 | Shake off the World | Kelly | |
| 2016 | One Church | Beth Barlow | |
| 2017 | Amazed by You | Mrs. Jill on Train | |
| 2017 | Hammer: The 'Rootin' for Regan' Story | Dr. Aubry | |
| 2022 | All I Didn’t Want for Christmas | Woman | Television film |

== In popular culture ==
Saving Jessica Lynch is an NBC made-for-TV movie directed by Peter Markle and was released in November 2003. Laura Regan portrays Jessica.
