= They (2002 film) =

2002 American supernatural horror film, directed by Robert Harmon

- Theatrical release poster
- Directed by: Robert Harmon
- Written by: Brendan Hood
- Produced by: Tom Engelman; Scott Kroopf
- Starring: Laura Regan; Marc Blucas; Ethan Embry; Dagmara Dominczyk
- Cinematography: Rene Ohashi
- Music by: Elia Cmiral
- Production companies: Dimension Films; Radar Pictures; Focus Features
- Distributed by: Dimension Films; Miramax Films
- Release date: November 27, 2002
- Running time: 90 minutes
- Country: United States
- Language: English
- Budget: $17 million
- Box office: $16.1 million

They (also known as Wes Craven Presents: They) is a 2002 American supernatural horror film, directed by Robert Harmon and starring Laura Regan, Ethan Embry, Dagmara Dominczyk, Jay Brazeau, and Marc Blucas. The plot is centered on a group of four adults experiencing night terrors and attempting to deal with the fallout from their prior childhood experiences. The film was produced by Ted Field and Tom Engleman; Wes Craven served as one of its executive producers and was its presenter.

The film was released during the Thanksgiving week and received generally negative reviews, though Laura Regan's performance received significant praise. The film was also a box office bomb, grossing only $16.1 million against its $17 million budget.

== Plot ==
In 1983, a boy named Billy Parks has difficulty falling asleep after waking up from a nightmare. His mother, Mary, assures him that the monster he thinks is in the closet is imaginary. As he tries to fall asleep, a dark apparition emerges from his closet and spirits him away.

In 2002, psychology grad student Julia Lund reunites with her childhood friend, a grown Billy. Julia experienced night terrors as a child after witnessing her father commit suicide, but has seemingly overcome the problem. Billy, startled by flickering lights in a diner and deathly afraid of the dark, tells her that he believes their night terrors are caused by something otherworldly. As a child, he was kidnapped by mysterious creatures and went missing for two days. He warns her to stay out of the dark, then shoots himself.

Julia stays over at her boyfriend Paul's apartment to grieve. That night, Julia hears the shower running and investigates. She finds a black fluid erupting from the sink drain, and the bathroom mirror opens to an alternate dimension filled with creatures. Paul hears her screams and finds her alone. He suggests she might have been sleepwalking, since she does not remember what happened.

At Billy's funeral, Julia meets two of his friends and roommates, Terry and Sam, who also had night terrors as children and have begun to believe his claims. Julia visits Billy's childhood room and discovers a drawer full of batteries. Later, as Julia drives, a creature sprints across the windshield, and the SUV's engine stops. As Julia attempts to restart it, she is startled by a vision of Billy and is nearly hit by a truck.

At Terry and Sam's apartment, the trio studies Billy's diary. Terry and Sam ask Julia if she has experienced a return of the night terrors, which she denies. Terry says her night terrors started after she witnessed her sister drown in a lake. In one instance, she disappeared from her bedroom and returned in the dog house; when her father reached in for her, she stabbed him in the eye with a kitchen knife, convinced he was a demon. Julia meets a girl named Sarah, one of Dr. Booth's patients, who claims that "They" will eat her in her nightmares and that the only thing that keeps them away is light. She starts picking at a strange mark on her arm; a similar mark had also appeared on Billy's hand, Sam's shoulder, and Terry's ankle. The creatures soon take Terry and Sam.

Julia discovers the mark on her forehead and pulls out a long needle. She runs to Paul's. Paul, convinced that she is insane, drugs her with a sleeping pill and calls Dr. Booth. Julia runs to the subway and becomes trapped in the station. She boards a train home and is the only passenger. The lights flicker, and the train stops. She gets off and sees all the light bulbs burst in the tunnel. The creatures attack her, but Julia manages to escape. When a group of tunnel workers attempt to help her, Julia assaults them with shards of glass, convinced they are inhuman.

Julia is committed to Dr. Booth's mental institution, where she is attacked and transported into the dimension she saw, this time inside a closet. She screams for help from Dr. Booth and an orderly, but neither can see nor hear her. Dr. Booth closes the door, and the creatures drag Julia away.

== Cast ==
- Laura Regan as Julia Lund
  - Jessica Amlee as Young Julia
- Marc Blucas as Paul Loomis
- Ethan Embry as Sam Burnside
- Dagmara Dominczyk as Terry Alba
- Jon Abrahams as Billy Parks
  - Alexander Gould as Young Billy
- Jay Brazeau as Dr. Booth
- Jodelle Micah Ferland as Sarah
- Desiree Zurowski as Mary Parks
- Mark Hildreth as Troy
- Jonathan Cherry as Darren
- Peter LaCroix as David Parks
- L. Harvey Gold as Professor Crowley
- David Abbott as Professor Adkins

== Production ==
The initial script featured godlike, organic machines who used humans for spare parts. This was rewritten from scratch by the producers. They was Radar's first film production.

== Release ==
Dimension purchased the distribution rights after footage was shown in England. They received its US premiere on November 27, 2002. In its opening weekend They grossed about $5.1 million. The film grossed $12.8 million in the US and $3.3 million overseas, making for a total worldwide gross of $16.1 million.

== Home media ==
The film was released on VHS and DVD on June 10, 2003. The film received its Blu-ray release on September 11, 2012, through Echo Bridge Entertainment, in a double feature with another Wes Craven film, Cursed.

=== Deleted scenes ===
There were scenes that were filmed but excluded from the final cut; the first two are available on the Japanese DVD and include:

- After Julia sees Sarah's mark on her arm she leaves Dr. Booth's waiting room with him walking in to find her gone. Julia is seen at a hardware store purchasing lighting supplies afterwards. The cashier asks her if she is going camping but she does not respond.
- Julia is seen packing in her bedroom to prepare for Billy's funeral while Paul makes her breakfast. The two then share an intimate moment before she leaves for the funeral.
- After Julia pulls out the splinter from her forehead she runs over to Sam's apartment as he is being attacked by "They", after calling out his name a few times more Sam's corpse is thrown through a window and lands on top of her, a monster on his back growls at Julia as it pulls his corpse into the shadows.

These deleted scenes were all included in the Blu-ray release of the film.

=== Alternate endings ===
Two alternate endings were shot but neither of them made it to the final cut, they include:

- After the incident in the subway the film's plot cuts to nine months later where Julia is shown hospitalized in a mental institution. Julia manages to convince a panel of psychiatrists including Dr. Booth that she has regained her sanity. She then sees one of the creatures climb through an air shaft in the ceiling but continues to deny their existence. She is finally released and proceeds to set up high powered lights all over her apartment room. The camera then pulls out of her bedroom as she is seen sitting on her bed. A door creaks open in her darkened hall and the film cuts to black. (This ending was shown to test audiences which was deleted and re-filmed after test audiences responded negatively to the ending; this ending is unavailable in any DVD.)
- Julia wakes up in the mental hospital and sees that all the people in her story − Dr. Booth, Sam, Billy, Terry − are patients in the mental hospital and her boyfriend Paul is a doctor working there. The doors to Julia's room then break open and one of "them" enters and seemingly attacks her until it is realized that it was all a delusion fabricated by Julia's mind and she had been suffering from schizophrenia throughout the whole movie. (Some versions of the DVD and all Blu-ray versions have this ending available.)

=== Alternate opening ===
An alternate opening shown to test audiences featured a flashback of young Julia sleeping instead of a flashback of Billy. This opening was scrapped and is unavailable on any DVD.

== Critical response ==
They holds a 38% approval rating on Rotten Tomatoes based on 55 reviews, and an average rating of 4.5/10. The site's consensus states: "They fails to sustain the level of creepiness necessary to rise above other movies in the horror genre." On Metacritic the film has a score of 31 out of 100 based on reviews from 16 critics, indicating "generally unfavorable reviews".

A. O. Scott of The New York Times wrote of the film: "Though you may share [the characters]' skepticism about the reality of those nightmare creatures, and occasionally twitch with impatience at the movie's clumsy dialogue and haphazard logic, you may also find yourself thoroughly terrified. I confess I was relieved when the movie ended and the lights came back on." Jamie Russell of the BBC awarded the film four out of five stars, writing: "None of it is likely to make this into the year's best horror movie, but as far as scaring the pants off you for an hour and a half, They will do that. And more." Peter Bradshaw of The Guardian wrote that the film "This entertaining scary movie isn't overly burdened with originality, but it's an enjoyable watch with some nicely creepy moments."

Writing for the San Francisco Chronicle, Mick Lasalle wrote: "Perhaps [executive producer] Craven was attracted by the metaphor of monsters and mental illness, but the metaphor is old, and director Robert Harmon does nothing to make it seem new again. Or perhaps Craven was just captivated by the movie's last and best scene, which is spooky enough to make They almost worth seeing."

== See also ==
- Shadow person
- Sleep paralysis
- Night terror
- Darkness Falls, a 2003 horror film with a similar premise to this film
