= Michael Catt =

American film producer, author, and pastor (1952–2023)

- Born: Michael Cameron Catt; December 25, 1952; Pascagoula, Mississippi, U.S.
- Died: June 12, 2023 (aged 70)
- Occupations: Pastor, Author, Producer
- Spouse: Terri Catt (m. 1974)
- Children: Hayley Catt; Erin Bethea

Michael Cameron Catt (December 25, 1952 – June 12, 2023) was an American film producer, author, and senior pastor of Sherwood Baptist Church from 1989 until his retirement in 2021. He was an executive producer for the 2008 film, Fireproof. He was an author of several books and booklets. He married Terri Catt in 1974, and they had two daughters, Hayley Catt and Erin Bethea, with the latter starring in Fireproof.

Catt received an undergraduate degree from Mississippi College, a master of divinity degree from Luther Rice Bible Seminary, and a doctor of ministry degree from Trinity Theological Seminary of South Florida.

Catt died of complications from prostate cancer on June 12, 2023, at the age of 70.

== Publications ==
- Left My Mind in Mississippi...But I Still Have My Ministry, Brentwood Christian Prress (January 1, 1994)
- May Be Wrong...But I Doubt It!
- Reflections On The Gospels
- Prepare for Rain: The Story of a Church That Believed God for the Impossible, CLC Ministries (July 2007)
- Fireproof Your Life: Building a Faith that Survives the Flames CLC Publications (2008)
- The Power of Desperation: Breakthroughs in Our Brokenness, B & H Publishing Group (2009)
- The Power of Persistence:Breakthroughs in Your Prayer Life, B & H Publishing Group (2009)
- The Power of Surrender: Breaking Through to Revival, B & H Publishing Group (2010)
