= Arts '73 =

Canadian television series

- Also known as: Arts '73/Arts '74/Arts '75
- Genre: arts
- Directed by: John McGreevy
- Presented by: Helen Hutchinson (1973); Sol Littman (1974); Pat Patterson (1974-1975)
- Country of origin: Canada
- Original language: English
- No. of seasons: 3

Production
- Executive producer: Roger Kennedy
- Producers: Nancy Ryley (1973); Garth Price
- Running time: 30 minutes

Original release
- Network: CBC
- Release: March 8, 1973 – June 22, 1975

Arts '73, Arts '74 and Arts '75 are Canadian television series that aired on CBC Television between March 8, 1973, and June 22, 1975. The show was hosted by Helen Hutchinson (1973), Sol Littman (1974) and Pat Patterson (1974–1975)

Some of the featured people included painter A.Y. Jackson, radio producer Andrew Allan, painter Jack Chambers, film historian John Kobal, tapestry maker Tamara Jaworski and composer Marek Norman.

Arts was a newsmagazine which featured items and guests from the subject of arts including visual, literary and performing arts in Canada and international.
