= Graham W. S. Scott =

Canadian lawyer (born 1942)

Graham Wilson Shatford Scott CM KC (born November 13, 1942) is a Canadian lawyer and expert in the incorporation, amalgamation, restructuring, and governance processes of health institutions in Canada. Scott is president of Graham Scott Strategies Inc. and partner emeritus at McMillan LLP. In 1992 he was a recipient of the 125th Anniversary of the Confederation of Canada Medal issued under the Authority of the Queen in recognition of public service. In 2005, he was appointed as a member of the Order of Canada in recognition of his volunteer service. In 2012, he was a recipient of the Queen's Diamond Jubilee Medal. In 2023 he was a recipient of Queen Elizabeth II Platinum Medal.

== Early life and career ==
Scott was born and raised in Nova Scotia and New Brunswick. He graduated from the Rothesay Netherwood School in 1960. Scott attended the University of Western Ontario, where he received his BA in 1965 and his law degree in 1966. He served in the Royal Canadian Navy Reserve as a UNTD Officer Cadet from 1960-63 and retired from the Reserve as a lieutenant in 1967.

Following two years of law practice in Toronto, Scott served as executive assistant to Robert Stanfield from 1970 to 1976 while Mr. Stanfield was the leader of the federal Progressive Conservative Party of Canada and Canada's Official Opposition. In 1976, Scott started to work for the Ontario government, first in the Ontario Ministry of the Attorney General and, in 1977, he became the assistant deputy general, courts administration and inspector of legal offices. Scott served as the deputy minister of the environment for Ontario from 1979 to 1981. In that time, he was involved in filing a lawsuit against the US Environmental Protection Agency to prevent the relaxation of pollution standards for coal-fired power stations due to concerns about acid rain in Canada. In 1981, he became the deputy minister of health for Ontario.

Graham joined McMillan LLP as a partner in January 1984 and was managing partner from 2000 to 2006. He established Graham Scott Strategies Inc. in 2008 when he retired from the McMillan partnership.

== Health care leadership ==
Scott has been involved in the amalgamation, restructuring and governance processes of more than 40 hospitals in Ontario and has served as interim CEO of Cancer Care Ontario (2001–2002). The Ontario Ministry of Health and Long-Term Care has, at several times, appointed Scott to investigate, supervise or assess financial and governance concerns in hospitals and other parts of the health care system across the province. In 2003, Scott was appointed the supervisor of the Hôpital régional de Sudbury Regional Hospital in response to significant deficit issues. In 2004, Scott was appointed to conduct an independent review of the Muskoka-Parry Sound Board of Health, finding that the board was not compliant with basic governance requirements and was ill-equipped to handle public health emergencies. In 2008 Scott was appointed to investigate chronic financial problems at Kingston General Hospital. Following Scott's report, the hospital CEO and several senior executives were terminated or asked to resign, while Scott took over on an interim basis as supervisor. From 2009 to 2010, Scott was appointed supervisor of Quinte Health Care, and he was appointed assessor for the Algoma Public Health Unit in 2015.

== Other leadership ==
Scott has been director of several associations, institutes, and corporations, including the Ontario Institute for Cancer Research, the Public Policy Forum, the Association of the Faculties of Medicine of Canada, the Atlantic Salmon Federation, Sanofi PasteurCanada, LDIC Inc, and the Rothesay Netherwood School. He has served as chair of the board of Canada Health Infoway, the Canadian Institute for Health Information, AllerGen NCE, and the Institute for Research on Public Policy. He was President of the University Naval Training Divisions Association from 2020 to 2023 and president of the Naval Reserve Association of Canada from 2023-2024.

== Personal life ==
Scott was married to Canadian television journalist Gail Scott (1943–2025) from 1972 until her death from lung cancer. They have two daughters: Gillian Scott, a partner in client relations and business development litigation at Osler, Hoskin & Harcourt LLP, and Genevieve Scott, a fiction writer who published the novel Catch My Drift with Goose Lane Editions in 2018 and The Damages with Penguin Random House Canada in 2023.
