= Laura Regan =

Canadian actress (born 1977)

- Born: October 17, 1977 (age 48); Halifax, Nova Scotia
- Occupation: Actress
- Years active: 2000–present
- Spouse: Farhad Safinia (m. 2007)
- Parents: Gerald Regan (father); Carole Harrison (mother)
- Relatives: Geoff Regan (brother); Nancy Regan (sister); Kelly Regan (sister-in-law); John Harrison (grandfather)

Laura Regan (born October 17, 1977) is a Canadian actress. She has had leading and supporting roles in the films Saving Jessica Lynch (2003), My Little Eye (2002), They (2002), Dead Silence (2007), and Atlas Shrugged: Part III (2014). She had a recurring role as Jennifer Crane in the TV series Mad Men.

== Early life ==
Regan was born in Halifax, Nova Scotia, the youngest in a family of seven. Regan is the daughter of Anita Carole Regan (née Harrison) and former Nova Scotia premier Gerald Regan; and sister of Geoff Regan, former Speaker of the Canadian House of Commons and former federal Minister of Fisheries and Oceans, and Live at Five's Nancy Regan. Her maternal grandfather was Saskatchewan MP John Harrison.

== Career ==
Regan's first role was in M. Night Shyamalan's Unbreakable. She landed her first starring role in Robert Harmon's They.

For her role of Emma in the film My Little Eye, Regan won in the category Outstanding Performance by an Actor – Female at the 2002 Atlantic Film Festival. She starred as Agatha on the television series Minority Report (2015).

== Filmography ==
Film
Year	Title	Role	Notes
2000	Unbreakable	Audrey Inverso (age 20)	
2001	Someone Like You	Evelyn	
2002	My Little Eye	Emma	
2002	They	Julia Lund	
2006	Hollow Man 2	Maggie Dalton	Direct-to-video
2007	Poor Boy's Game	Emma	
2007	Dead Silence	Lisa Ashen	
2008	How to Be a Serial Killer	Abigail	
2014	Atlas Shrugged: Part III	Dagny Taggart	

Television
Year	Title	Role	Notes
2000	Law & Order: Special Victims Unit	Denise Sandler	Episode: "Wrong Is Right"
2003	Law & Order: Criminal Intent	Tish Van Der Wahl	Episode: "Zoonotic"
2003	Judging Amy	Ellen Brady	3 episodes
2003	Cold Case	Rosie Miles	Episode: "Fly Away"
2003	Blessings	Shelley	TV movie
2003	Saving Jessica Lynch	Jessica Lynch	TV movie
2004	CSI: Miami	Mrs. Riley	Episode: "Crime Wave"
2005	Charmed	Joanna	Episode: "Death Becomes Them"
2005	Ghost Whisperer	Serena Hilliard	Episode: "Ghost Bride"
2006	Everwood	Ruth	Episode: "An Ounce of Prevention"
2008	Heartland	Lauren	Episode: "Corporate Cowgirls"
2008–10	Mad Men	Jennifer Crane	Recurring role, 6 episodes
2009	Without a Trace	Cate Connelly	Episode: "Friends and Neighbors"
2009	Terminator: The Sarah Connor Chronicles	Dr. Felicia Burnett	Episode: "The Good Wound"
2010	Burn Notice	Sarah Aikins	Episode: "Where There's Smoke"
2010	Nikita	Lisa Han	Episode: "Rough Trade"
2011	Bones	Carol Samuel	Episode: "The Sin in the Sisterhood"
2011	The Closer	Malin Turner	Episode: "Home Improvement"
2011	Castle	Rebecca Siegal	Episode: "Heartbreak Hotel"
2012	Fairly Legal	Olivia McKee	Episode: "Teenage Wasteland"
2012	NCIS: Los Angeles	Carol Walker / Sharon Walker	Episode: "Touch of Death"
2014	Constantine	Claire	Episode: "Rage of Caliban"
2015	Murder in the First	Mary Rentman	3 episodes
2015	Minority Report	Agatha	Main role
2016	Longmire	Tizz Kaufman	Episode: "From This Day Forward"
2016	Code Black	Janie	Episode: "Corporeal Form"
2017	NCIS	Amber Davis	Episode: "Voices"
2018	American Woman	Carol	Episode: "I Will Survive"
2018	Legends of Tomorrow	Jane Hawthorne	Episode: "Witch Hunt"
