= Good Morning Canada =

Defunct Canadian weekend morning show

- Presented by: Nancy Regan; Tom Knowlton; Coleen Christie; Janet Stewart; Darren MacFadyen
- Country of origin: Canada
- No. of episodes: Weekends

Production
- Production location: Various

Original release
- Network: CTV Television Network
- Release: September 2000 – 2009

Related
- Canada AM; CTV Morning Live

Good Morning Canada is a national weekend breakfast television show aired on the CTV Television Network in Canada from circa fall 2000 to early 2009.

The program was pre-taped during the week and aired twice each weekend, Saturday morning at 8 and Sunday morning at 7, with news inserts provided by CTV Newsnet (now known as CTV News Channel). The show's content consists mainly of feature segments originally produced for local CTV newscasts.

The show was always produced at one of the network's stations other than flagship CFTO Toronto, moving every three to six months. There was a single host at any one time, generally a personality from the then-current producing station.

Unlike the weekend editions of American network morning shows, the program was separate from CTV's weekday morning program Canada AM. In the early 1990s, the network carried a one-hour weekend program, Canada AM Weekend, re-airing the show's best segments of the week. Good Morning Canada launched several years after Canada AM Weekend was cancelled and has no connection to the earlier program.

Due to low ratings and network cutbacks, the show was discontinued. The last episode aired on February 1, 2009.

== Hosts and locations ==
- September 2001 to November 2002: Nancy Regan, CJCH-TV Halifax
- June 2007 to September 2007: Maria Panopolis, CJCH-TV Halifax
- September 2007 to January 2008: Coleen Christie, CIVT-TV Vancouver
- February 2007 to May 2008: Maralee Caruso, CKY-TV Winnipeg
- June 2008 to September 2008: Lori Graham, CFCF-TV Montreal
- October 2008 to January 2009: Michelle Tonner, CICI-TV Sudbury
- Date unknown: Tara Robinson, CKCK-TV Regina
- Date unknown: Carrie Doll, CFRN-TV Edmonton
- Date unknown: Jocelyn Laidlaw, CFCN-TV Calgary
- Date unknown: Janet Stewart, CFTO-TV Toronto
- Date unknown: Darren MacFadyen, CFTO-TV Toronto
- Date unknown: Tom Knowlton, CKCO-TV Kitchener
