= Sherwood Christian Academy =

Coordinates: 31.50565°N 84.24030°W

Location
- 1418 Old Pretoria Rd. Albany, Georgia 31721; USA

Information
- School type: Private
- Religious affiliation: Christianity
- Denomination: Baptist
- Established: 1985
- Principal: Jonathan Dyal (high school and middle school), and Sylvia Hagar (elementary and preschool)
- Headmaster: Kenny Roberts
- Grades: K3-12
- Age range: 3-18
- Enrollment: Approx. 400
- Colors: Red and blue
- Slogan: "Educating for Eternity"
- Athletics: SCA Eagles
- Mascot: Victory the Eagle
- Accreditation: ACSI GISA
- Website: www.scaeagles.com

Sherwood Christian Academy (SCA) is a private Christian school serving K3–twelfth grade students. It is run as a ministry of Sherwood Baptist Church. SCA is accredited by the Southern Association of Colleges and Schools and the Association of Christian Schools International. SCA is a member of the Georgia Association of Private & Parochial Schools (GAAPS). It is located in Albany, Georgia, United States.

SCA's Fine Arts Program includes One Act, Drama, Vocal Music, Music Theater, Visual Arts and Spring Literary in which they have won many Regional Titles. Academic competitions include Math Counts, Quiz Bowl, Chess, History Bowl, Geography Bee, Robotics, and Spelling Bee.

== Athletics ==
Sherwood Christian Academy has the following sports: football, cheerleading, girls' and boys' basketball, girls' softball, baseball, soccer, track, volleyball, tennis and golf. The Eagles have won many region titles, including Region and State Champions in girls' varsity soccer, boys' varsity basketball, boys varsity football, boys varsity tennis, girls varsity tennis, and cross country.
