= Gail Scott (journalist) =

Canadian television personality (1943–2025)

Gail Mary Scott (25 June 1943 – 26 November 2025) was a Canadian journalist, television personality, and educator, best known as a co-host of Canada AM from 1978 to 1981.

Born in Ottawa to Dorothy and Claude J. Scott, Gail Scott graduated from Carleton University with a bachelor of journalism in 1966 and began her television career with the Canadian Broadcasting Corporation (CBC) at CBOT-TV in Ottawa. In 1971, she became the CBC's parliamentary correspondent. In 1972, she became the parliamentary correspondent for CTV Television Network. In 1976, Scott was the field producer and host of W5. She was co-host of Canada AM] from 1978 to 1981 with Norm Perry.

In 1972, she married Graham W. S. Scott, a lawyer then working as the executive assistant for Progressive Conservative leader Robert Stanfield.

In 1982, after CTV told her she would be moved to the network's Beijing bureau, she resigned preferring to remain in Toronto with her two young daughters and husband. Joan Donaldson, head of the school of broadcast journalism at what Ryerson, hired her as an instructor. Scott later became director of the broadcast school. She left Ryerson in 1993.

Scott also served as a part-time member of the CRTC in 1987 and was named commissioner in 1993. As commissioner, Scott and fellow CRTC member William Callahan opposed CRTC's 29 July 1997 granting of the last FM broadcast band frequency in Toronto to CBC because "an Afro-Canadian music station would better serve the public interest in Canada's largest city, which has a 200,000-strong Caribbean community".

She was part of the board of directors of the Michener Awards Foundation from 1986 to 1994, and its president from 1991 to 1993. On leaving the CRTC in 1998, Scott became a member of the Ontario Criminal Injuries Compensation Board until 2008. She was inducted into the Canadian Broadcast Hall of Fame in 2005. She also spent two years on the board of the Canadian Television Fund.

Raised Catholic, Scott became disillusioned with the church over its refusal to ordain women, its stance against same-sex marriage, and sexual abuse scandals. She began attending an Anglican church and soon became a confirmed Anglican. In 2017, Scott was granted a master's degree in theological studies at Trinity College, University of Toronto.

Scott died of lung cancer on 26 November 2025.
