= Perry's Probe =

Canadian television series

Perry's Probe is a Canadian half-hour investigative journalism television series, hosted by Norm Perry, which aired on CTV in the 1968-69 television season. The show began on CFTO-TV as a local television series before going national. It aired at 2:30 PM weekdays. It lasted just the one season.
