= Virtuous (film) =

- Virtuous film poster
- Directed by: Bill Rahn
- Screenplay by: Jason Campbell, Tara Lynn Marcelle
- Story by: Jason Campbell
- Based on: Virtuous by Jason Campbell
- Produced by: JCFilms; Exec Producers: Jason Campbell; Dean Haskins; Benny Tate
- Starring: Erik Estrada; Erin Bethea; Ben Davies; Jessica Lynch; Kelly Bowling
- Cinematography: James Burgess
- Edited by: Bill Rahn
- Music by: Sam Redfern
- Production companies: JC Films; Tri-Rahn Pictures
- Distributed by: JC Films
- Release date: May 9, 2014 (Atlanta, Georgia)
- Running time: 152 minutes
- Country: United States
- Language: English
- Box office: $500,000

Virtuous is a 2014 American Christian drama film directed and produced by Bill Rahn, written by Jason Campbell & Tara Lynn Marcelle, and starring Erik Estrada, Erin Bethea, Ben Davies, and Jessica Lynch. Based upon an original story by Jason Campbell, it was produced by Christian film company JCFILMS.

== Synopsis ==
Women of all ages and races are experiencing pressures from an increasingly unavoidable culture. If they attempt to stand up for themselves, they are criticized, marginalized, and demonized. As a film, Virtuous is a modern-day version of Proverbs 31, set as a multi-plot project, with stories including that of a Hollywood starlet, a soldier on the battlefield, a successful businesswoman, and the housekeeping and cooking skills of an old mom. The film involves 10 women who eventually meet and attempt to show what it means to be a “virtuous” woman in today’s society. The film focuses on empowering women to live righteously while remaining unapologetic in their actions or beliefs.

== Principal cast ==
- Erik Estrada as Jack Evans
- Erin Bethea as Diane Landers
- Ben Davies as Patrick Walters
- Jessica Lynch as Summer Gabriel
- Kelly Bowling as Kathy Morris

== Production ==
Jessica Lynch was brought aboard the film in a role of a military specialist arranging to locate a female POW after speaking with story creator Jason Campbell. Her role was loosely based on her own experiences in Iraq. Some of the filming took place in areas of Butts County, Georgia over a one-month period in January 2014. Locations included local homes and offices, as well as the Butts County Courthouse and Butts County Sheriff’s Office. Other Georgia locations included Juliette, Griffin, Macon and the Rock Springs Church in Milner. In February 2014, JC Films announced that Erik Estrada would film some of his final scenes for Virtuous in Rock Hill, South Carolina in early September, 2014. Five songs from Christian singer/songwriter Holly Spears are featured in the film, and released May 1, 2014, Spears' music video Where'd You Go contains clips from the film.
