= Jeff Hutcheson =

Canadian meteorologist and sportscaster

Jeff Hutcheson (born April 15, 1954 in Toronto, Ontario) is a former Canadian weather and sports anchor for Canada AM.

He started his career in 1976 at CFRB as a "good news" reporter, during his first year in college. His next work was with CKCO-TV in Kitchener, Ontario, where he was a sports anchor, reporter, producer, television host and writer from 1976 to 1997. Hutcheson then became substitute sports/weather host on Canada AM in 1992 until 1997. For a short time in 1997, Jeff Hutcheson was the morning host of News Talk 570, leaving shortly after. On September 1, 1998, he began reporting on sports and weather full-time on Canada AM.

He has also published two travel books, Best of Canada and Best of Atlantic Canada.
