= Israel Youth Award =

The Israel Youth Award
- Founded: 1985; 41 years ago
- Type: National Award Authority
- Location: Israel
- Origins: Duke of Edinburgh's Award
- Key people: Aviva Ben Raphael, National Director
- Website: www.iya-israel.com

The Israel Youth Award is a self-development program for 14 to 25-year-olds. Over 7 million young people worldwide have taken up the Award challenge. A member of the International Award Association, the Israel Youth Award is one of 62 National Award Authorities delivering the International Award, which started life in the UK in 1956 as The Duke of Edinburgh's Award.

== History of The International Award Programme ==
The Israel Youth Award is an self-development Programme for all 14- to 25-year-olds. Over 7 million young people worldwide have taken up the Award challenge. As a member of the International Award Association, the Israel Youth Award is one of 62 National Award Authorities delivering the International Award, which originated in the UK in 1956 as The Duke of Edinburgh’s Award.

The Award Programme was introduced in Israel in 1986 by Yehuda Arel, who perceived it to be a practical challenge to Israeli youth. The Programme is operated in Israel as a not-for-profit organisation chaired by Nathan Wolloch, Deputy Mayor of Tel Aviv-Yafo, in a joint effort with the Ministry of Education, Youth and Society Administration. In practice, the Award Programme is delivered to young people by Award leaders from different cities and settlements, teachers, and students and leaders who have themselves completed the Programme. The uniqueness of the Programme lies in its multiculturalism and its openness to young people from all sectors of society – religious or socio-economic. It encompasses Jews, Arabs, Druze, Christians and Bedouin, new immigrants and "Sabras" (native Israelis) alike, young people with disabilities, youth at risk, and youth with special needs.

The Award Programme was created through the efforts of three men who were responding to a common anxiety about how best to engage young people. After World War II there was a growing concern about the development of boys due to the gap between leaving school at 15 and entering National Service at 18.

== The basic philosophy ==
The Award Programme is based on the educational philosophy of Dr. Kurt Hahn. Based on the philosophy of Hahn, founder and headmaster of Gordonstoun School in Scotland, the Programme was designed around four sections: Rescue & Public Service Training, the Expedition, Pursuits & Projects, and Fitness.

Hahn’s ideas were considered progressive at the time, but today they remain as relevant as ever to young people living in a complex modern society. His theories were based on his belief in the British school system, his research on the teaching methods of the Greek philosopher Plato, and later, on his personal experience as a school principal.

Specifically, his reading of Plato taught Hahn that education should bring about the balanced development of all human elements, in terms of body, mind, and soul. Thus, his vision was to provide a programme for personal development that would complete and broaden education. This end is achieved through the four Sections of the Programme: Service, Adventurous Journey, Physical Recreation and Skills.

Hahn believed that the Award Programme would offer its participants a chance to realize their personality and their abilities - something that he considered to be a necessary step in the self-development of youth. He saw the Award Programme as a tool through which young people are encouraged to explore new areas and to discover new talents within and by themselves.

== A Programme for everyone ==
The founder of the Programme, the Duke of Edinburgh, believed that every young person, anywhere around the world, at the right age, has the potential to participate in the Award and to complete the Levels successfully. A mental or physical ability or social circumstances should not be an obstacle. That is why the Programme is equally open to all. The criteria of Award receipt, after successful completion of one of the Levels, are individual effort and self-improvement.

Progress is measured only against one's personal capabilities and objectives; meaning, this is a non-competitive program of individual challenge.

The Award Programme can be adjusted so it would match individual discrepancies in abilities, focus of interests and life circumstances. As a result, the Programme provides an opportunity for young people with special needs to be equal in rights and mandates, next to their healthy peers. Perhaps this principle of universality is an important factor in the success of the International Award Programme all across the world.

The basic structure and the philosophy of the Award Programme has not changed since its inception in 1956. Only specific details within the frame were modified, naturally due to the accumulated experience and for the purpose of maintaining the relevance of the Programme, in terms of its ability to fulfill the changing needs of young people today.

== Levels ==
A marathon and not a sprint – A successful completion of every Level demands determination and commitment, instead of a short burst of enthusiasm. The defined time for each Level is the minimal requirement. This allows the participants to work at their own pace, according to their amount of spare time, up until their 25th birthday.

=== Bronze ===
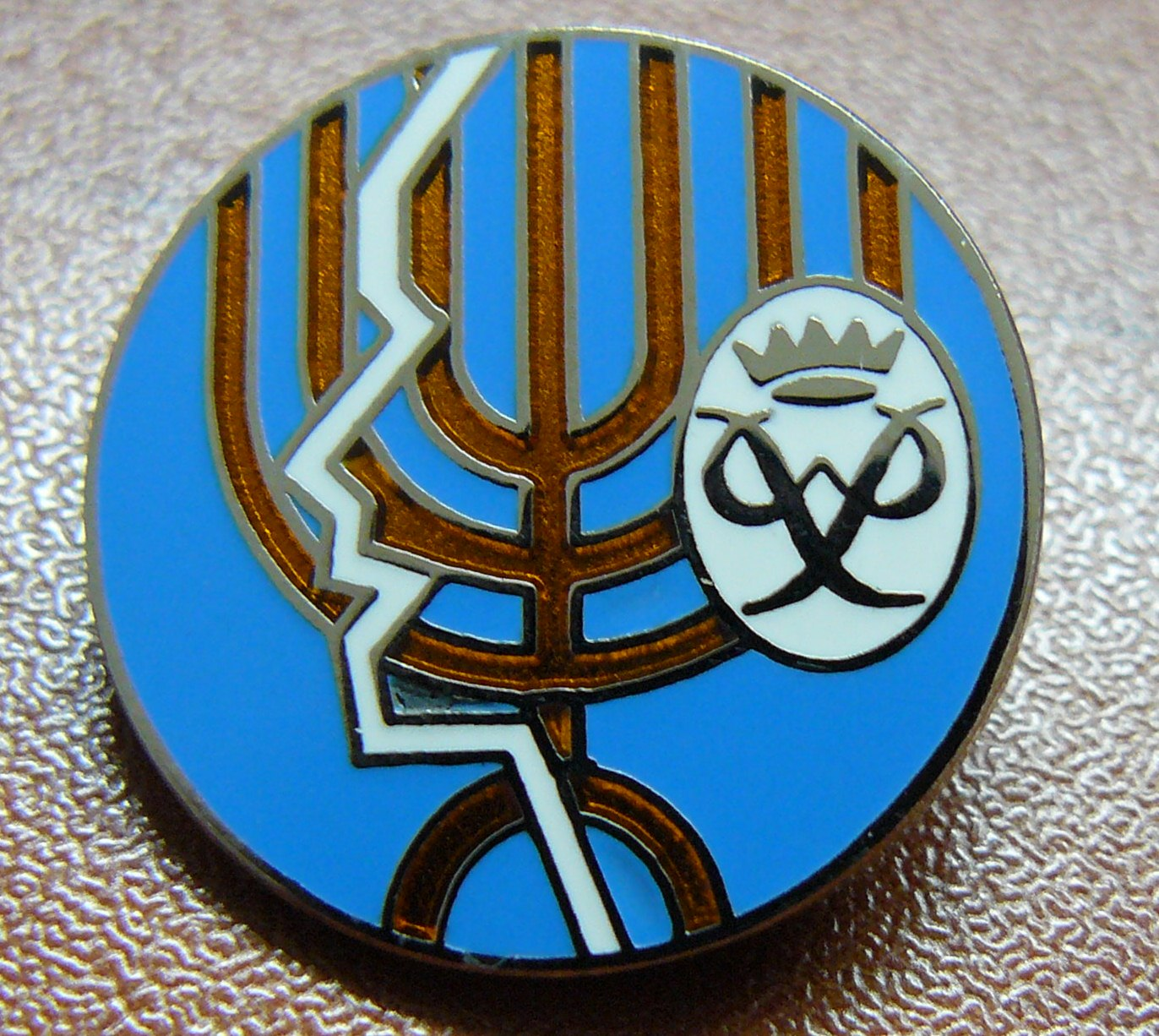

Participants must be at least age 14 to enter. A minimum of one hour a week is required per activity. Participants record their activity for each of the four Sections in their record book\Service:

- Service – at least one hour a week.
- Personal Skill – at least one hour a week.
- Physical Recreation – at least one hour a week.
- Adventurous Journey/Research – Plan prepare and undertake a 2-day, 1 night Adventurous Journey in a group covering a minimum total distance of: Walking 24–35 km or Cycling 100–130 km over two consecutive days.

In Israel, at Bronze Level, this section is filled by a journey made not by the participants but the Award holder and authority. After a minimum 6 months (or more, depending on the participant, there is no "deadline") the participant is eligible to receive the Bronze Award, if the participant has completed all four sections. In Israel, the Bronze Award badge is designed specially for the Israel Award and has the Award symbol and the Bronze badge symbol (this badge is approved by the International Award Association) (www.intaward.org).

=== Silver ===
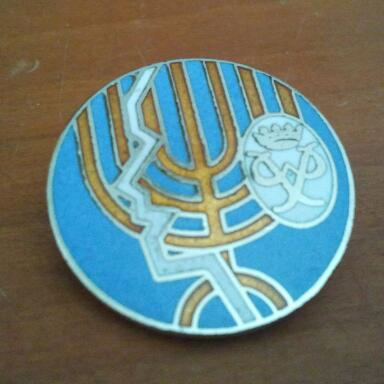

Participants must be at least age 15 to start their Silver. A new Level holds new challenges, with a minimum of two hours’ a week required for each section. Just as at Bronze Level, there are four sections to complete. Entering directly to Silver is possible, but there are further requirements:

- Service – two hours a week
- Personal Skill – two hours a week
- Physical Recreation – two hours a week
- Adventurous Journey/Research – Plan prepare and undertake a 3-day, 2 night Adventurous Journey in a group covering a minimum total distance of: Walking 54–79 km or Cycling 190–220 km over 3 consecutive days.

In Israel, this section is filled by a journey made not by the participants but the Award holder and authority. After a minimum 12 months (for participants who finished the Bronze level. 18 months is required for participants who have entered directly at Silver) the participant is eligible to receive the Silver Award, if the participant has completed all four sections. In Israel the Silver Award badge is designed especially for the Award and has the Award symbol and the Bronze badge symbol (this badge is approved by the International Award Association).

=== Gold ===
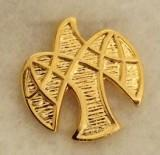

Participants must be at least age 16 to enter at Gold. A minimum of three hours’ a week is required. There are five sections to complete at Gold Level:

- Service – three hours a week
- Personal Skill – three hours a week
- Physical Recreation – three hours a week
- Adventurous Journey/Research – Plan prepare and undertake a 4-day, 3 night Adventurous Journey in a group covering a minimum total distance of: Walking 84–110 km or Cycling 300–350 km over 4 consecutive days.
- Residential Project – A shared activity with a group in a residential setting for 5 days and 4 nights, available in Israel through different cities or in a delegation.

In Israel, the Adventurous Journey is not made by the participants but the Award holder and authority. After a minimum 12 months (for participants who have completed Silver Level. 24 months is required for participants who entered directly to Gold) the participant is eligible to receive the Gold Award, if the participant has completed all four Sections, plus their Residential Project.

Upon completion, participants are invited to the Annual Gold Award ceremony, held at the home of the British Ambassador in Israel, where they will be presented with their Gold Award badges.

== Sections ==
=== Service ===
Participants engage with their community and discover the impact they can have through:

- Community service projects
- Conservation work
- Voluntary service in hospitals or community homes
- More specialised training, such as lifesaving, first aid or rescue services.

=== Adventurous Journey ===
The Adventurous Journey is about adventure and discovery. Participants develop an understanding of the environment, and the importance of working together in a team with a common purpose. It can be on foot, by bicycle, boat or on horseback. Training, preparation, self-sufficiency and self-reliance are the key elements.

=== Skills ===
The Skills Section is about developing personal interests and learning practical skills. There are almost limitless possibilities to choose from. There is no set standard that participants must reach: they set their own goals and measure their progress against them.

=== Physical Recreation ===
By undertaking some form of organised and regular physical activity, participants show perseverance and improve their fitness. Their goal is to record their individual progress. Most team and individual sports are included, such as football, athletics, and archery.

=== Residential Project ===
This is only a requirement at Gold Level. It aims to broaden experience through living and working with others (who are not everyday companions). The project takes place over a period of five consecutive days. It requires resilience, adaptability and consideration for others.

== The Award Programme In Israel ==
The Israel Youth Award operates under the auspices of the Ministry of Education's unit for youth and society, and is led by twenty-three board members, including public representatives, educators and volunteers. The Programme is operated by leaders, volunteers, students receiving a "Perach" scholarship and Award leaders. The Programme is unique due to the fact that young people aged 14–25 from diverse backgrounds take part in it, as well as its ability to develop their skills and discover their goals. It allows anyone, no matter what their religion, race, gender, ability or political affinity, to participate.

The Award enables young people to realize their potential by developing their creativity; increasing their general knowledge and helping them reach higher achievements. It teaches them to preserve and take on leadership roles and to create a stronger link to their country. In addition, it increases their social and communal involvement and encourages them to help others.

The Programme educates young people to use their spare time constructively through four fields of activities: hobbies and skills, sports and recreation, expeditions and community service.

It allows personal growth and self-discovery through gradual transformation, starting at Bronze Level, moving on to Silver and finally reaching Gold. It promotes links between youth from all over the country, and from all sectors. The Award also encourages Israeli youth to link up with young people from all over the world and act as Israeli young ambassadors through various delegations, youth exchanges, international conventions and seminars. The Award Programme is non-competitive and is given on the basis of the personal process that each participant undergoes.

== See also ==
- The Duke of Edinburgh's Award
- International Award Association
