= Jack Hutchinson (Canadian football) =

Former Canadian football player

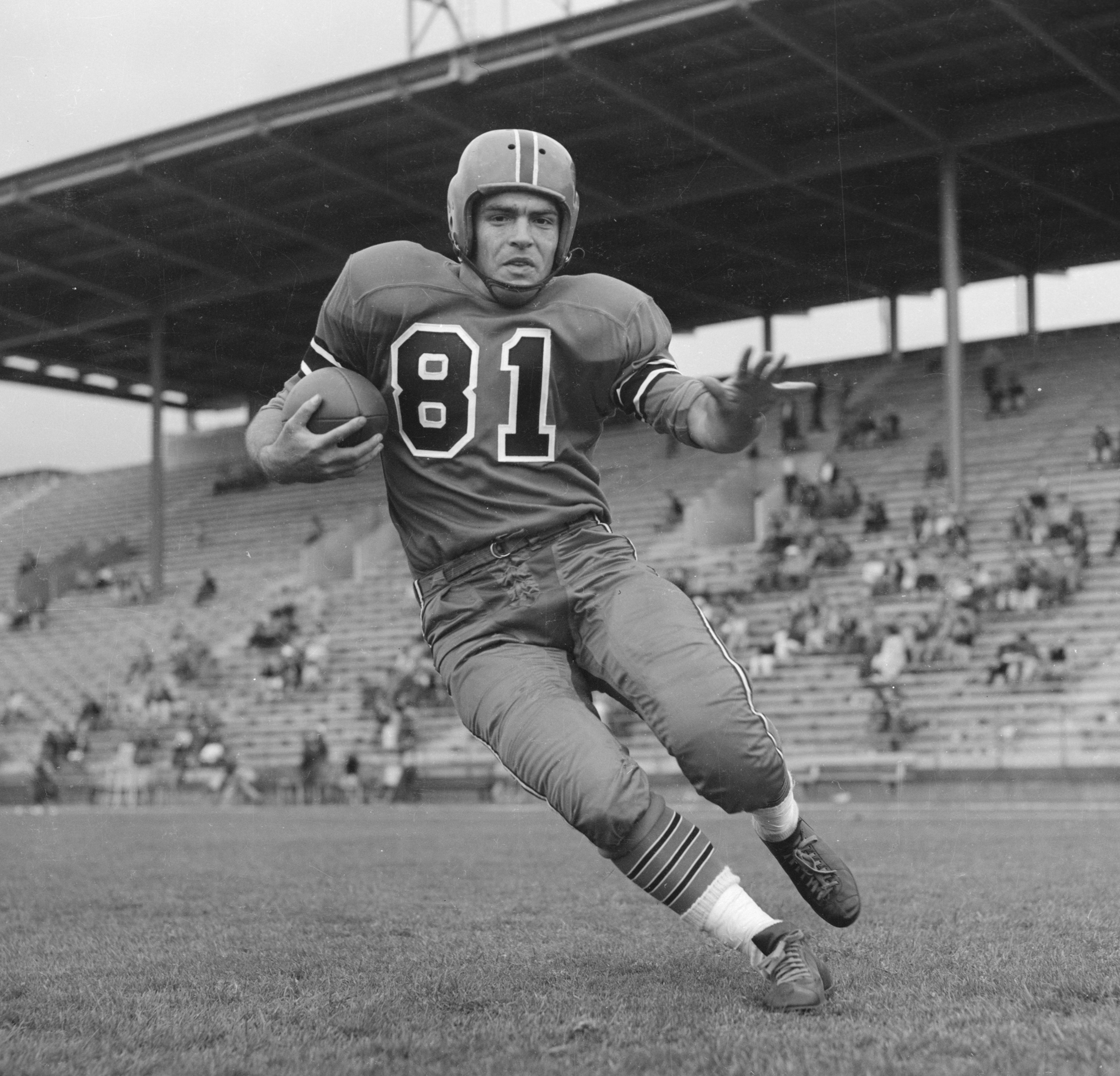
- Hutchinson in 1954

Profile
- Position: Fullback

Personal information
- Born: March 19, 1932; Toronto, Ontario, Canada
- Died: January 12, 2003 (aged 70); Toronto, Ontario, Canada
- Listed height: 5 ft 11 in (1.80 m)
- Listed weight: 190 lb (86 kg)

Career information
- University: UBC

Career history
- 1952: Saskatchewan Roughriders
- 1954–1955: BC Lions
- 1956–1957: Winnipeg Blue Bombers

Jack Hutchinson (March 19, 1932 - January 12, 2003) was a Canadian professional football player. Hutchinson played for the BC Lions, Saskatchewan Roughriders, and Winnipeg Blue Bombers. He played junior football for the Saskatoon Hilltops and at the University of British Columbia.
