= Mohammed Odeh al-Rehaief =

Iraqi attorney (born 1970)

- Born: circa 1970 (age 55–56); Najaf, Iraq
- Education: Degree in political law from Basra University
- Occupation: Member of The Livingston Group in Washington, D.C.
- Spouse: Iman

Mohammed Odeh al-Rehaief (Arabic: محمد عودة الرهيف; born c. 1970) is an Iraqi attorney who helped the United States armed forces rescue prisoner of war Jessica Lynch from a hospital in Nasiriyah. As reward for his assistance, the U.S. government granted him humanitarian asylum on April 28, 2003. That same year, al-Rehaief published the autobiography Because Each Life Is Precious, in which he explains why he decided to help Lynch.

== Involvement in the rescue of Jessica Lynch ==
After some time in the custody of the Iraqi army regiment which captured her, Lynch was taken to a hospital in Nasiriya. Iraqi hospital staff, including the doctors Harith Al-Houssona and Anmar Uday, claim to have shielded Lynch from Iraqi military and government agents who were using the hospital as a base of military operations. U.S. forces were tipped off as to Lynch's whereabouts by an Iraqi, sympathetic to her plight, who told them she had been tortured and injured but was still alive. The Iraqi was described as a 32-year-old lawyer, initially described only as "Mohammed" and later identified as one Mohammed Odeh al Rehaief. In light of Mohammed's role in Lynch's rescue, Mohammed and his family were granted refugee status by the government of the United States.

Initial reports indicated that Mohammed's wife was a nurse by the name of Iman in the hospital where Lynch was being held captive, and that while visiting his wife at the hospital, Mohammed noticed that security was heightened and inquired as to why. However, hospital personnel later confirmed only part of Mohammed's story, indicating that while Mohammed had indeed visited the hospital, his wife was not a nurse there, nor was there any nurse by the name of Iman working there. While visiting the hospital from which Lynch was eventually extracted, Mohammed claimed that he observed an Iraqi colonel slapping Lynch. "My heart stopped," said Mohammed, "I knew then I must help her be saved. I decided I must go to tell the Americans."

Mohammed's story has been disputed by Lynch herself and doctors working at the hospital, who claim that Lynch was shielded and protected from Iraqi military personnel by hospital staff and was cared for well throughout her stay at the hospital. Moreover, according to reports, on March 30, Al-Houssona reportedly attempted to have Lynch delivered to the U.S. forces, an attempt which had to be abandoned when the Americans fired on the ambulance carrying her.

According to Mohammed's version of the events leading up to Lynch's rescue, he walked six miles to a United States Marine checkpoint to inform American forces that he knew where Lynch was being held. After talking with the Marines, Mohammed was then sent back to the hospital to gather information that was used to plan Lynch's rescue. Allegedly Mohammed returned to the checkpoint with five different maps of the hospital and the details of the security layout, reaction plan, and shift changes.

The U.S. military reportedly learned of Lynch's location from several informants, one of whom was Mohammed.

== Leaving Iraq ==
After learning of Mohammed's role in Lynch's rescue, Friends of Mohammed, a group based in Malden, West Virginia, was formed to fight for Mohammed's U.S. citizenship and to bring him to West Virginia. On April 29, 2003, Secretary of Homeland Security Tom Ridge announced that Mohammed Odeh al Rehaief, his wife, and their 5-year-old daughter had been granted humanitarian asylum on April 28. Al Rehaief and his family were brought to the United States at his request on April 10. Al Rehaief published a book, Because Each Life Is Precious (ISBN 0060590548), in October 2003, for a reported US$150,000. In 2003 he took a job as a consultant at Livingston Group, a Washington D.C. lobbying firm run by Bob Livingston.
