= Helen Hutchinson =

Canadian television broadcaster (1934–2023)

- Born: Helen Anne Donnelly; December 15, 1934; Vancouver, British Columbia, Canada
- Died: February 21, 2023 (aged 88)
- Education: University of British Columbia; University of Toronto
- Occupations: Television broadcaster, journalist, interviewer
- Years active: 1960s–1990s
- Known for: Canada AM; W5; Hockey Night in Canada
- Spouses: Jack Hutchinson (divorced); David Harrison (divorced); Ed Gabis (separated)
- Children: 2
- Awards: ACTRA Award for Best Public Affairs Broadcaster (1975)

Helen Anne Donnelly Hutchinson (December 15, 1934 – February 21, 2023) was a Canadian television broadcaster, journalist and interviewer. She was the first woman to host CTV's national morning program Canada AM, serving as co-host from 1973 to 1979, and subsequently worked as a host and reporter for the network's investigative journalism program W5 from 1979 to 1987. In 1975, she became the first woman to serve as a commentator on Hockey Night in Canada.

During her career, Hutchinson travelled to 89 countries and interviewed numerous political figures and entertainers, including United States president Jimmy Carter. She received an ACTRA Award for Best Public Affairs Broadcaster in 1975 and was nominated again in 1976.

== Early life and education ==
Hutchinson was born Helen Anne Donnelly on December 15, 1934, in Vancouver, British Columbia. Her father, Gordon Donnelly, worked in the forestry industry. Her mother, Nina (née Diakonoff), was born in Siberia and immigrated to Canada by way of Japan after her family fled the Russian Revolution of 1917.

An academically accomplished student, Hutchinson entered the University of British Columbia at the age of 16 and graduated at 20 with an honours degree in English.

She married Canadian football player Jack Hutchinson in her twenties and accompanied him during his professional career. The couple subsequently lived in England while he studied at the London School of Economics. They later settled in Winnipeg, where he obtained employment with the Canadian Broadcasting Corporation (CBC).

In November 1994, at the age of 59, Hutchinson received a master's degree in library science from the University of Toronto.

== Career ==
=== Early broadcasting career ===
Hutchinson began her broadcasting career in Winnipeg while raising her two children, Megan and Max. She initially contributed book reviews to CBC programs before moving into television, including work as a commentator on the sports program Sportsview.

She subsequently wrote book reviews for the Toronto Star and became a regular contributor to CBC Radio's national morning program hosted by Bruno Gerussi. She also appeared frequently as a guest panellist on the television quiz show Front Page Challenge, although these appearances ended when she joined CTV.

Before joining Canada AM, Hutchinson had hosted several interview programs for CBC Television in Toronto, including four series of 13 episodes each. Her work attracted the attention of CTV executives and helped establish her reputation as a television interviewer. She also hosted the CBC arts program Arts '73.

=== Canada AM (1973–1979) ===
In 1973, Hutchinson became the co-host of Canada AM, CTV's national morning news and current affairs program. She remained with the program for approximately five years, interviewing politicians, entertainers, authors and other public figures.

The position required her to begin work before dawn, travelling from her home in Toronto's Rosedale neighbourhood to CTV's studios in Scarborough near Highway 401. Her duties included preparing for interviews, reviewing research and conducting live discussions with guests from a wide range of backgrounds.

The program occasionally broadcast from international locations. In 1978, Hutchinson and producer Rosemary Vukmanich travelled to Israel, where Canada AM was recorded at the Jerusalem Plaza Hotel and transmitted by satellite to Toronto. Interview subjects included Israeli political and military figures Moshe Dayan, Yitzhak Rabin and Ariel Sharon.

Among her other interview subjects were actors Omar Sharif and John Travolta, whom she later recalled as particularly memorable guests. She also interviewed prominent journalists, including Mike Wallace, and was known for thoroughly researching her subjects and reading books before interviewing their authors.

=== Hockey Night in Canada (1975–1976) ===
During the 1975–76 NHL season, Hutchinson became the first woman to appear as a commentator on Hockey Night in Canada. She was hired to contribute to the program's Wednesday night broadcasts, which were carried by some CTV affiliates. CTV permitted her to undertake the assignment, although it required her to miss her regular Canada AM duties the following morning.

Producer Bob Gordon said the program had considered adding a female commentator for more than a year and had sought an experienced broadcaster with knowledge of hockey rather than making a token appointment. Hutchinson, a lifelong sports enthusiast, had played sports during her youth and was familiar with professional athletics through her first husband's career in the Canadian Football League.

Her appointment represented an early breakthrough for women in Canadian sports broadcasting, a field then dominated by male commentators and journalists.

=== W5 (1979–1987) ===
In 1979, Hutchinson left Canada AM to become a host and field reporter for W5, CTV's investigative journalism and current affairs program. Her assignments took her to locations around the world, covering political, social and consumer issues.

Among her reports was an investigation into Canadians travelling to the Cayman Islands for cosmetic surgery.

Hutchinson was also involved in one of the program's most controversial broadcasts. In 1979, W5 aired a report alleging that foreign students from China were occupying a disproportionate number of places at Canadian universities, particularly the University of Toronto. The report drew widespread criticism for racism and factual inaccuracies, including the identification of Canadian-born students of Chinese descent as foreign students. CTV subsequently apologized and dismissed at least one producer. Hutchinson, who narrated the report but had not conducted its research, remained with the program.

Hutchinson continued with W5 until 1987. During her two decades with CTV, she became one of Canada's best-known television broadcasters.

=== Other broadcasting work ===
In addition to her regular assignments, Hutchinson participated in coverage of major public events, including the Grey Cup Parade, the wedding of Prince Charles and Lady Diana Spencer in 1981, and Toronto's Santa Claus Parade between 1975 and 1980.

After leaving CTV, she pursued further education and returned to television in 1995 as host of Point of View: Women, a current affairs program on the newly launched Women's Television Network (WTN). The channel began broadcasting on January 1, 1995.

== Awards and recognition ==
Hutchinson received the ACTRA Award for Best Public Affairs Broadcaster in 1975 and was nominated for the same award in 1976. Her work on Canada AM and W5, together with her pioneering appearance on Hockey Night in Canada, established her as one of the prominent women in Canadian television journalism during the 1970s and 1980s.

== Personal life and death ==
Hutchinson was married three times. Her first husband was Jack Hutchinson, a professional football player who played for the BC Lions, Saskatchewan Roughriders and Winnipeg Blue Bombers during the 1950s. They had two children, Megan and Max, before divorcing. Her second husband was David Harrison, and her third was Ed Gabis, from whom she was amicably separated at the time of her death.

Hutchinson experienced depression and struggled with alcohol use during her life. Her son Max later discussed her alcoholism publicly, suggesting that it was partly influenced by the drinking culture prevalent in Canadian newsrooms during her broadcasting career.

Her daughter Megan died in 1989. Hutchinson died on February 21, 2023, at the age of 88. She was survived by her son and granddaughter.
