= Sherwood Baptist Church =

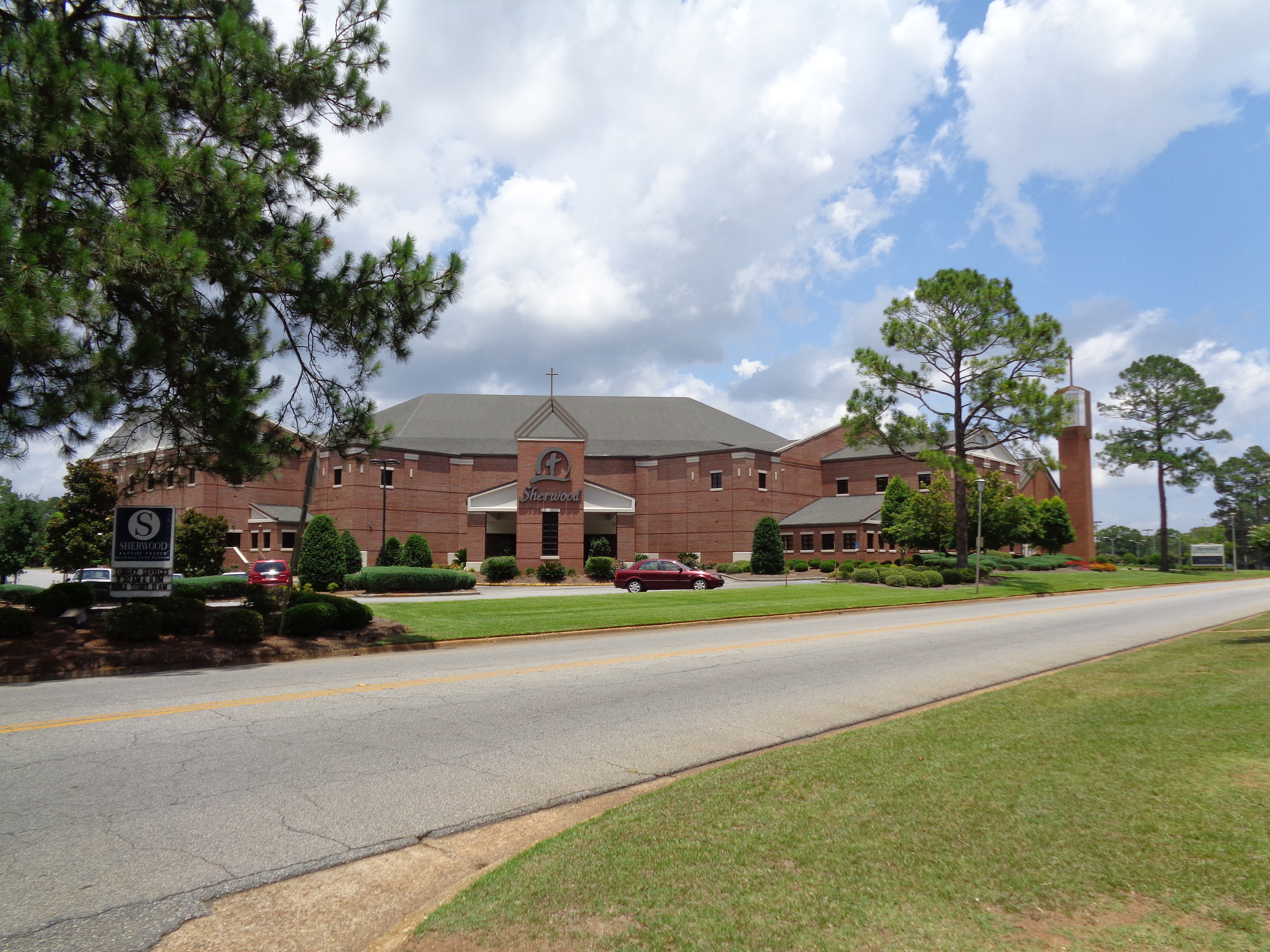
- Sherwood Baptist Church
- 31.60648°N 84.19940°W
- Location: 2201 Whispering Pines Road; Albany, Georgia
- Country: USA
- Denomination: Baptist
- Website: Official website

History
- Former name: First Baptist Church Mission
- Founded: 1955
- Founder: Albert Cardwell

Clergy
- Pastor(s): Executive Pastor: Jim McBride; Senior Associate Pastors: Brian Kelley, Stephen Kendrick, John Spencer, Seth Brasher, David Smith, Ken Bevel; Associate Pastors: Timothy Johnson, Alex Kendrick,

Sherwood Baptist Church is a Baptist church located in Albany, Georgia. It is affiliated with the Southern Baptist Convention.

== History ==
Sherwood Baptist Church began meetings in the US Army Reserve building in 1955, now First Baptist Church Mission. A year later Sherwood got its own 6.3 acres (25,000 m^{2}) of land. Sherwood's first pastor was Albert Cardwell, from 1955 to 1963. During his years as pastor, Dr. Cardwell saw continued growth through an expanded Sunday School and the construction of an educational building that could seat 750 people in 1958. This education space quickly doubled in capacity with further construction efforts. Reverend Law Mobly served as Sherwood's second pastor from 1964 to 1967.

Curtis Burge was pastor from 1968 to 1978. In 1973 the congregation began the construction a 1,000-seat sanctuary, including a bell tower, library, bridal and music suites, pipe organ, adult Sunday School department and all the furnishings and equipment. The building program cost $1,386,745 and was completed by February 1976.

W. A. "Billy" Smith served as Sherwood's fourth pastor from 1979 until 1988. During this time, Sherwood continued to increase, and in 1983, the church completed a building program with the dedication of the Family Life Center. This $1.2 million facility included two handball courts, a basketball court, running track, weight room, ceramics room, offices and education space. Sherwood further expanded its ministry in 1985 when the church announced the opening of Sherwood Baptist Christian School, offering education for grades K-3 through eighth. Over $100,000 was raised in one month for the $400,000 property.

Michael Catt served as pastor from 1989-2021. Sherwood built a prayer chapel in April 1991. Other new areas of ministry opened up during this time, including an expanded Media Ministry and the Alpha Crisis Pregnancy Center. Sherwood Baptist Christian School became Sherwood Christian Academy and offered classes through the twelfth grade. With the purchase of the Riverview Academy property in 1994, the middle and high schools moved to Old Pretoria Road. At one point it was a megachurch with close to 2,000 weekly members. These new facilities included a cafeteria, library, auditorium, gymnasium and sports stadium. In 2001, it opened a 2,250-seat Worship Center and a 300-seat Chapel. The New Orleans Baptist Theological Seminary Extension Center opened its doors in 2000. The center now offers graduate classes for students in Albany and surrounding communities. outreach ministry. In 2001, the Strauss House opened across the street from the church.

In 2018, weekly attendance was 1,500.

== Schools ==
Sherwood Christian Academy is a division of the church with one location. It is a private Baptist school. Uniforms are required and a religious class is taught. Sherwood owns Legacy Park in Albany.

== Media ==
Sherwood Baptist Church runs and owns Sherwood Pictures, a film-production company which has produced Flywheel (2003), Facing the Giants (2006), Fireproof (2008), and Courageous (2011). It was started in 2002 by Alex Kendrick with $20,000 in donations. On September 30, 2011, Sherwood Pictures released their film Courageous. Sherwood Pictures' sister studio, Kendrick Brothers Productions produced War Room (2015).

In 2008 an arsonist tried to burn down Sherwood Baptist Church, on the same day as the Los Angeles premiere of Fireproof.

== Pastors ==
The senior pastor is Paul Gotthardt. There are a number of associate pastors including, Ken Bevel, John Spencer, Jim McBride, Brian Kelley, Dan Mingo, Alan Gotthardt, Patrick Sebesta, Mark Scardino, Tim Johnson and David Smith.
