= The Duke of Edinburgh's International Award - Canada =

The Duke of Edinburgh's International Award Canada
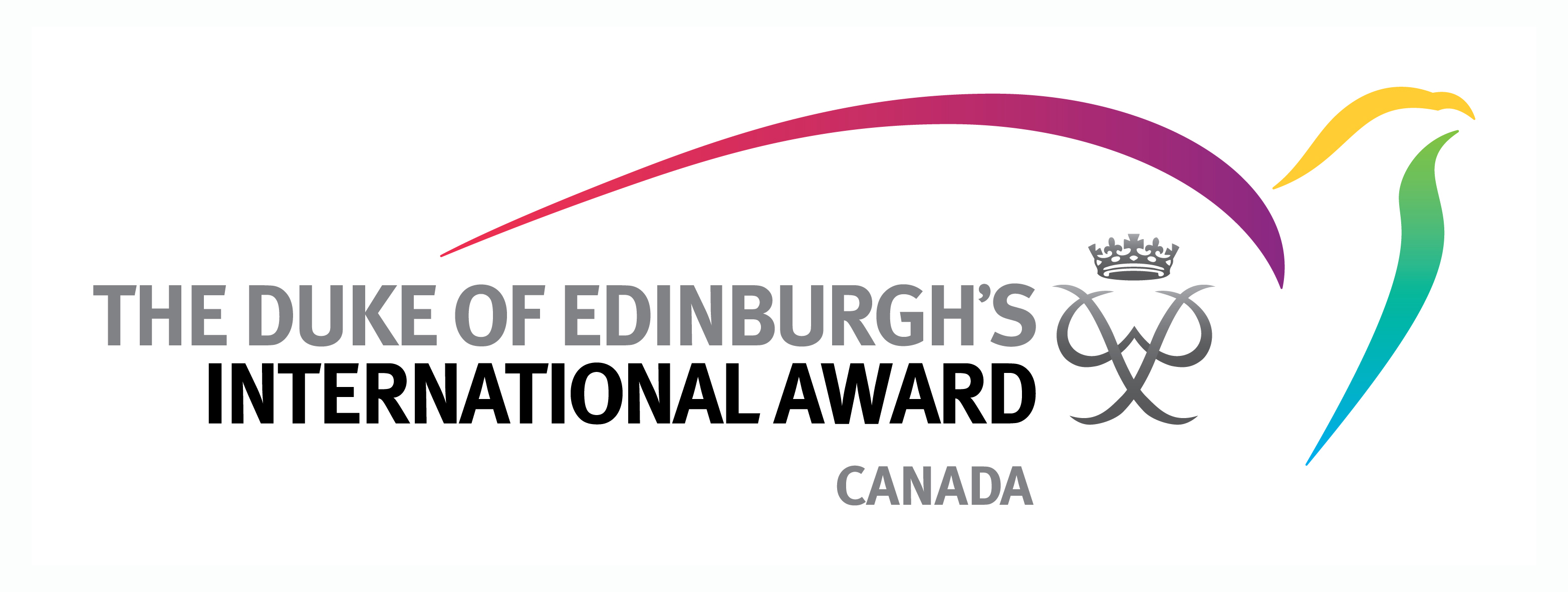
- Founded: 1963; 63 years ago
- Founder: Prince Philip, Duke of Edinburgh
- Type: National Award Authority
- Purpose: Inspire and promote lifelong improvement for all young Canadians by encouraging personal development and achievement.
- Location: Canada
- Origins: Duke of Edinburgh's Award
- Region served: Across Canada in all provinces and territories and in 143 countries worldwide.
- Members: 42,494
- Employees: 50
- Volunteers: 2,690
- Website: dukeofed.org
- Formerly called: The Duke of Edinburgh's Award - Canada

The Duke of Edinburgh's International Award Canada is the Canadian branch of The Duke of Edinburgh's Award, a personal achievement program available to people in Canada between the ages of 14 and 25. As of 2020, over 500,000 had earned the award. Prince Edward, Duke of Edinburgh is patron of The Duke of Edinburgh's International Award.

== Concept ==
The Duke of Edinburgh's Award was created by Prince Philip, Duke of Edinburgh, then the consort of Elizabeth II, Queen of Canada, with the intent of encouraging young people to set and achieve their own goals and challenges. There are three levels—bronze, silver, and gold—but, no competition between participants, as it is a personal achievement program, and there are no set standards to measure achievements; the criteria are based on each participant's improvement and growth. Participants must set goals in multiple program areas: service, skills, physical recreation, an adventurous journey, and an additional project.

== History ==
The award was launched in Canada in 1963 and opened up to all young Canadians between the ages of 14 and 24. Pilot projects were launched in various cities in Nova Scotia, Ontario, and British Columbia. The following year, one of the first award ceremonies was held, with 48 bronze and six silver awards presented, and the first Gold Award ceremony took place in Ottawa in 1968, when The Duke of Edinburgh presented 18 recipients with their Gold Awards.

By 1986, the award was operating in Newfoundland, Prince Edward Island, Nova Scotia (1970), Quebec, Manitoba, Saskatchewan, Alberta, British Columbia, the Yukon, and the Northwest Territories. In 2018, over 42,000 Canadians participated in the award. Nationally, the program has developed several initiatives to expand the award so it becomes more accessible to at-risk youth, inner-city youth, young offenders, youth with disabilities, as well as northern and aboriginal youth.

The award in Canada is associated with the Duke of Edinburgh's International Foundation. In 1967, Canada hosted the first International Gold Event in 1967. Twenty-one years later, Canada became a founding member of the Duke of Edinburgh's Award International Association and is currently one of the four largest national award authorities. In 2002, Canada hosted its second international gold event, Rendezvous 2002.

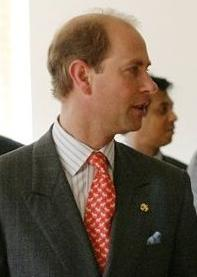
Prince Edward, Duke of Edinburgh and patron of The Duke of Edinburgh's International Award, in Toronto

Following the death of Prince Philip in 2021, his youngest son, Prince Edward, Duke of Edinburgh, was made patron of The Duke of Edinburgh's International Award, announced on 14 March 2023, four days after his oldest brother, Charles III, King of Canada, created him Duke of Edinburgh. He had been a trustee of the international award since 2006.

== Provincial ==
The lieutenant governor of Nova Scotia has, each October since at least 2011, issued a royal proclamation declaring Duke Awareness Week, begun with a flag-raising ceremony at Province House. Meant to mark the launch of The Duke of Edinburgh's International Award program in schools across Canada and celebrate students in the province who "are making a difference in their community", during the week, young people, award participants, leaders, board members, parents, and volunteers take part in events highlighting participants' work.

== See also ==
- The Duke of Edinburgh's Award
- Gaisce – The President's Award
- Hong Kong Award for Young People
- International Award Association
- Israel youth award
