= List of Global Television Network personalities =

== Global National and National Anchors/Hosts ==
- Dawna Friesen – Global National Weekdays
- Coleen Christie - Global National Weekend
- Jeff Semple – The West Block
- Jackson Proskow - Washington Bureau Chief
- Mike Armstrong - Quebec Correspondent
- Eric Sorenson - Senior National Affairs Correspondent
- Reggie Cecchini - Washington Correspondent & Producer
- Neetu Garcha - (2022)(On Leave)
- Sarah MacDonald (Neetu Garcha) - BC Correspondent (Interim)
- Redmond Shannon - Europe Correspondent
- David Akin - Chief Political Correspondent
- Jeff McArthur - The Morning Show
- Carolyn MacKenzie - The Morning Show

== Global BC ==
=== News Anchors ===
- Sonia Sunger - Global News Morning (MMC, BC) (2013)
- Jason Pires - Global News Morning (MMC, BC) (2023)
- Chris Gailus - Global News Hour at 6 (Live) and Global News at 11 (MMC, BC)(2006)
- Sophie Lui - Global News at 5 (Live) and Global News Hour at 6 (Live) (2003)
- Anne Drewa - Consumer Matters on the News Hour (Live) (2005)
- Jordan Armstrong (Sarah MacDonald) - Global News at Global News Hour at 6 and Global News at 11 (MMC, BC) - Weekends (2012)
- Jennifer Palma - Global News Morning and Global News at Noon (MMC, BC) - Weekend (2007)
- Sarah MacDonald - Currently filling-in on a maternity leave at Global National, returning to Global BC in 2028 (2018–)

=== Weather/Traffic Anchors ===
- Mark Madryga - Chief Meteorologist, Morning Weather Anchor (1994)
- Kristi Gordon - Senior Meteorologist, Evening Weather Anchor (2006)
- Katelin Owsianski - Morning Traffic Anchor (2015)
- Yvonne Schalle - Meteorologist (2013)
- Steph Florian - Weather Presenter (2022–2024)

=== Sports ===
- Squire Barnes - Sports Director (1993)
- Jay Janower (1993)
- Barry Deley (1997)
- Asa Rehman (2013–2015 as News Anchor and 2022 as Sports Producer)

== Global Okanagan ==
=== News Anchors ===
- Global BC Staff - Global News at 5

== Global Edmonton ==
=== News Anchors ===
- Erin Chalmers - Global News Morning and Global News at Noon
- Vinesh Pratap - Global News Morning and Global News at Noon
- Carole Anne Devaney - Global News at 5 and Global News Hour at 6
- MacKenzie Mazankowski - Global News at 11
- Jayme Doll - Global News Hour at 6 and Global News at 11 - Weekend
- Bianca Millions - Global News Morning (MMC) - Weekend
- Angus Watt - business and financial reporter

=== Weather/Traffic Anchors ===
- Tiffany Lizee - Chief Meteorologist
- Britt Prendergast - Morning Weather Specialist
- Daintre Christensen - Morning Traffic Anchor
- Kabi Moulitharan - Weekend Morning Weather Specialist
- Russ Empey - Weekend Evening Weather Specialist (Calgary)

== Global Calgary ==
=== News Anchors ===
- Bindu Siri - Global News Morning and Global News at Noon
- Blake Lough - Global News Morning and Global News at Noon
- Dallas Flexhaug - Global News at 5 and Global News Hour at 6
- MacKenzie Mazankowski - Global News at 11
- Jayme Doll - Global News Hour at 6 and Global News at 11 - Weekend
- Leslie Horton - Global News Morning - Weather/Traffic
- Bianca Millions - Global News Morning - Weekend

=== Weather/Traffic Anchors ===
- Tiffany Lizee - Chief Meteorologist
- Leslie Horton - Morning Weather/Traffic Specialist
- Russ Empey - Weekend Evening Weather Specialist
- Kabi Moulitharan - Weekend Morning Weather Specialist (Edmonton)

== Global Lethbridge ==
=== News Anchors ===
- Dallas Flexhaug - Global News at 5, 6, 11

=== Weather Anchors ===
- Tiffany Lizee - Chief Meteorologist

== Global Saskatchewan ==
=== News Anchors ===
- Jaden-Lee Lincoln - Global News Morning
- Miranda Anthistle - Global News Morning
- Lisa Dutton - Global News at 5, 6, and 10
- Kevin Hirschfield - Global News at 10
- Kevin Gallagher - Global News Weekend

=== Weather Anchors ===
- Peter Quinlan - Chief Meteorologist

== Global Winnipeg ==
=== News Anchors ===
- Jaden-Lee Lincoln - Global News Morning
- Miranda Anthistle - Global News Morning
- Lisa Dutton - Global News at 5, 6, and 10
- Kevin Hirschfield - Global News at 10
- Kevin Gallagher - Global News Weekend

=== Weather Anchors ===
- Peter Quinlan - Chief Meteorologist

== Global Toronto ==
=== News Anchors ===
- Jaden Lee-Lincoln (Candice Daniel) - Global News Morning and Global News at Noon
- Miranda Anthistle - Global News Morning and Global News at Noon
- Antony Robart - Global News at 5 and Global News at 6
- Candice Daniel (Tracy Tong) - Global News at 6 and Global News at 11
- Kevin Gallagher - Global News Weekend

=== Weather Anchors ===
- Anthony Farnell - Chief Meteorologist
- Ross Hull - Meteorologist

== Global Montreal ==
=== News Anchors ===
- Jaden-Lee Lincoln - Global News Morning and Global News at Noon
- Miranda Anthistle - Global News Morning and Global News at Noon
- Laura Casella - Global News at 5:30 and 6:30, Global News at 11
- Candice Daniel (Tracy Tong) - Global News at 11 (MMC, Toronto)
- Kevin Gallagher - Global News Weekend (MMC, Toronto)

=== Weather Anchors ===
- Anthony Farnell - Chief Meteorologist
- Ross Hull - Meteorologist

== Global New Brunswick ==
=== News Anchors ===
- Laura Casella - Global News Evenings
- Candice Daniel (Tracy Tong) - Global News at 11
- Jaden-Lee Lincoln - Global News Morning and Global News at Noon
- Miranda Anthistle - Global News Morning and Global News at Noon
- Kevin Gallagher - Global News Weekend

=== Weather Anchors ===
- Anthony Farnell
- Ross Hull

== Global Halifax ==
=== News Anchors ===
- Laura Casella - Global News Evenings
- Tracy Tong - Global News at 11
- Jaden-Lee Lincoln - Global News Morning and Global News at Noon
- Miranda Anthistle - Global News Morning and Global News at Noon
- Kevin Gallagher - Global News Weekend (MMC, Toronto)

=== Weather Anchors ===
- Anthony Farnell
- Ross Hull

== Global Peterborough ==
=== News Anchors ===
- Noor Ibrahim - Global News Morning (MMC)
- Teresa Kaszuba - Global News Morning (MMC)
- Jayden Lee-Lincoln (Candace Daniel) - Global News at Noon (MMC, Toronto)
- Keri Ferguson - CHEX News at 6:00 and 6:30
- Jaye Mankinson - CHEX News at 6:00 and News Manager
- Mark Giunta - CHEX News Updates

=== Weather Anchors ===
- Noor Ibrahim
- Caley Badore

== Global Kingston ==
=== News Anchors ===
- Bill Welychka - Global News Morning (MMC)
- Maegen Kulchar - Global News Morning and CKWS News at Noon (MMC)
- Noor Ibrahim - Global News Morning (MMC, Global Peterborough)
- Teresa Kaszuba - Global News Morning (MMC, Global Peterborough)

=== Weather Anchors ===
- Caley Badore

== Global Durham ==
=== News Anchors ===
- Noor Ibrahim - Global News Morning (MMC, Global Peterborough)
- Teresa Kaszuba - Global News Morning (MMC, Global Peterborough)
- Miranda Anthistle - Global News at 5 (MMC, Global Toronto)
- Keri Ferguson - Global News at 5:30 (MMC, Global Peterborough)
- Antony Robart - Global News at 5:30 (MMC, Global Toronto)

=== Weather Anchors ===
- Caley Badore (MMC, Global Peterborough)
- Peter Quinlan
- Noor Ibrahim
