= CHUM Chart =

Canadian music chart

The CHUM Chart is a long-running Canadian hit parade countdown radio show, originally aired on Toronto radio station CHUM AM then later revived on its sister station CHUM-FM.

It consisted of 50 top tunes from May 1957 to July 1968, but in August 1968, the top 50 song list was reduced to 30 top songs until the final hit parade was issued in June 1986. At the time of its retirement in 1986, it was the longest-running Top 40 chart in the world produced by an individual radio station. (It was later surpassed by Hamilton's CKOC, which produced a weekly chart for the 32-year period from 1960 to 1992.)

On January 10, 1998, sister station CHUM-FM, which airs a hot adult contemporary format, revived the CHUM Chart name for a new countdown show. New editions of the CHUM Chart Top 30 continue to air weekly on CHUM-FM as of 2024.

The CHUM Chart also aired as a television program on Citytv every Saturday at 2:00 p.m. until January 2008, when the show was discontinued after Rogers Communications gained control of the Citytv stations and replaced it with the JackNation chart, a show based on their Jack FM radio brand. The program aired a list of the most popular songs in the countdown, starting from No. 30, playing approximately half of them.

From the chart's debut in 1957 until the launch of the national RPM chart magazine in 1964, the CHUM Chart was considered Canada's de facto national chart due to its status as the single most influential of the various local Top 40 charts. After 1964, however, RPM supplanted CHUM as the definitive national chart, although within Toronto the CHUM chart remained more influential while RPM was initially viewed as an upstart competitor rather than a national complement.

== History ==
The chart debuted on May 27, 1957, under the name CHUM's Weekly Hit Parade. The CHUM Chart name was adopted in 1961.

The chart was published for 1,512 consecutive weeks, and had 694 different number-one songs over the course of its original run. Its first number-one single was Elvis Presley's "All Shook Up", and its final number-one was Madonna's "Live to Tell".

In the week of March 30, 1964, The Beatles simultaneously held nine spots in the top 40, placing at No. 1, 2, 4, 5, 8, 11, 14, 29 and 39.

One band, Mack Truck and the Exhaust Fumes, appeared as a hit-bound entry on the CHUM Chart of September 19, 1966 despite not actually existing. In an informal experiment to test how accurate the chart reporting really was, program director Bob McAdorey placed a fake entry for a nonexistent song (called "The Queen") by the nonexistent band as a hit-bound track (i.e., not actually on the chart, but listed in a separate section as a new song getting airplay.) Later tellings of the story had McAdorey being astonished when the song indeed started rising up the chart on the basis of listener requests and orders from record stores. However, this in fact never happened, as the song only appeared for one week as a hit-bound, and was never listed on the chart proper. A similar stunt was tried the following year with a second nonexistent Mack Truck track called "It's Christmas Once Again", which appeared for one week as a hit-bound on December 18, 1967. It too never appeared on the actual numbered chart.

From its inception until 1975, each week's CHUM Chart was published in a brochure format, with additional features promoting the station and its personalities. It was distributed to record stores and music venues across the city and throughout the station's listening area in Southern Ontario. After the April 26, 1975 CHUM hit parade, the brochure was discontinued, and each week's chart was instead published in the entertainment section of the Toronto Sun until the end of 1976. From January 1977, the CHUM hit parades were weekly published in the entertainment section of the Toronto Star. Mike Myers, Gordon Lightfoot, Dick Clark and Dave Thomas all reportedly owned collections of CHUM Charts.

For the first 26 weeks in 1957, the chart published full information only for the top 10, listing only song titles for the remainder of the chart. Because CHUM's frequency was 1050, the top 10 hits were printed in large, boldface type, with the rest of the top 50 following in smaller type. On November 25, 1957, the chart began publishing information on all listed songs. On April 13, 1959, the chart briefly added a Top 10 albums list, which was discontinued after October 17, 1960, revived as Top 5 on May 27, 1963, discontinued again after January 30, 1967, revived again on May 8, 1971, expanded to a top 15 list in 1975, and finally discontinued permanently in 1979. (At this point, sister station CHUM-FM initiated their own separate top 30 album chart.)

Author Ron Hall published The CHUM Chart Book (ISBN 0920325157) in 1983, listing every song that had appeared in the CHUM Charts to that point. To commemorate the 1,500th chart, for the week of March 15, 1986, trivia questions were asked during its sneak preview broadcast. Winners won a poster format of the chart and 45s of the week's top 30 singles. Following the discontinuation of the chart, Hall published an updated edition in 1990 listing every charted song and profiling the history of the chart. The final chart, for the week of June 14, 1986, was never published until Hall's 1990 book. A commemorative list of all the chart's number one songs was also published in poster format by CHUM in 2007 to commemorate the station's 50th anniversary.

== See also ==
- Music of Canada
- Canadian Singles Chart
