= CHNB-DT =

Television station in Saint John, New Brunswick

Semi-satellite of CIHF-DT, Halifax, Nova Scotia
- Saint John, New Brunswick; Canada
- Channels: Digital: 12 (VHF); Virtual: 12
- Branding: Global New Brunswick (general); Global News (newscasts)

Programming
- Affiliations: 12.1: Global

Ownership
- Owner: Corus Entertainment; (Corus Television Limited Partnership)
- Sister stations: CIHF-DT

History
- First air date: September 5, 1988
- Former call signs: CIHF-TV-2 (1988–2011); CIHF-DT-2 (2011–2013)
- Former channel numbers: Analog: 12 (VHF, 1988–2011)
- Former affiliations: Independent (1988–1997)
- Call sign meaning: New Brunswick

Technical information
- Licensing authority: CRTC
- ERP: 6 kW
- HAAT: 354.0 m (1,161 ft)
- Transmitter coordinates: 45°28′40″N 66°14′0″W
- Translator(s): see § Transmitters

Links
- Website: Global New Brunswick

CHNB-DT (channel 12) is a television station in Saint John, New Brunswick, Canada, owned and operated by the Global Television Network, a division of Corus Entertainment. It serves as the network's outlet for both New Brunswick and Prince Edward Island (by way of a repeater in Lot 22 serving Charlottetown). CHNB-DT is sister to CIHF-DT in Halifax, Nova Scotia, and the two stations share studios on Gottingen Street in Downtown Halifax; CHNB-DT's transmitter is located on Mount Champlain. Aside from the transmitters, CHNB-DT does not maintain any physical presence locally in New Brunswick or Prince Edward Island.

== History ==
The station was launched on September 5, 1988, as CIHF-TV-2, owned by the Irving family's New Brunswick Broadcasting Company, which also owned CHSJ-TV, the CBC affiliate for all of New Brunswick. The station launched with three transmitters, namely those in Saint John, Fredericton, and Moncton. When MITV launched, the station took all prime time American shows from CHSJ—reportedly a prelude to the CBC dropping all prime time American programming nationwide.

It was closely tied with sister station CIHF-TV in Halifax. Both shared the same branding, MITV (Maritimes Independent Television), and their schedules were almost identical. However, the stations offered separate newscasts to their respective provinces and opportunities for advertisers to buy ad space on one or both stations. Furthermore, despite the New Brunswick station's rebroadcaster-like callsign, the stations were separately licensed by the Canadian Radio-television and Telecommunications Commission (CRTC). At the time, MITV was the only over-the-air independent television station in the area, with studios and main operation centre in Halifax, and all other functions in Saint John. As MITV shared owners with CHSJ-TV, a popular joke in the Maritimes was that MITV stood for "More Irving Television".

After losing $5 million each year since sign-on, MITV was sold to Canwest on August 29, 1994. This was part of a three-way deal, which saw the CBC taking control of CHSJ-TV, moving it to Fredericton, and renaming it CBAT, making it a full CBC O&O. Later in the year, MITV moved its operational and business headquarters to Dartmouth.

Former logo of Global Maritimes, from 1997 to 2006

In 1995, MITV's Saint John offices were moved out of the old CHSJ building and into a new facility in Brunswick Square. Within a year of new ownership and its resulting reorganization and marketing focus, the station became profitable for the first time in its short history. In 1997, as a part of Canwest's rebranding program, MITV became "Global Maritimes".

Logo of Global Maritimes, from 2006 to 2013

Additional retransmitters signed on in 1998, in Charlottetown, Woodstock, Miramichi, and St. Stephen.

On December 17, 2012, Global Maritimes officially began operations at its new home on Göttingen Street in Downtown Halifax. Previously, its operations were located on Akerley Blvd. in an industrial park in the Halifax suburb of Dartmouth.

In April 2013, CIHF-2 was rebranded Global New Brunswick, while sister station CIHF was rebranded Global Halifax, marking the first time the stations have not used the same brand. The stations began producing separate nightly newscasts in addition to their already existing separate evening newscasts, and a new senior correspondent was hired for Global New Brunswick. The stations will continue to share newsgathering resources and anchors. Despite the separate branding, the two stations' non-news schedules are almost identical with the exception of idents and commercials.

Although the station has always been separately licensed, it was not until June 18, 2013, that its callsign changed from CIHF-DT-2 to CHNB-DT, a callsign formerly held by a now defunct television station in North Bay, Ontario from 1971 to 2002.

== News operation ==
Global New Brunswick airs two local newscasts a day: Global News at 6 presented from the Global Montreal studios by Aalia Adam and Global News at 11, presented out of Global's Toronto news centre. Global News at 6 New Brunswick is followed by Global National at 6:30 p.m. On Saturdays and Sundays, Global Halifax and Global New Brunswick share pan-regional newscasts, presented from the Toronto news centre, on weekends at 6 p.m. and 11 p.m. In addition, Global New Brunswick simulcasts Global News Morning live from Global Halifax weekday mornings from 6 a.m. to 10 a.m.

Along with a growing number of other Global stations, CHNB has used a "virtual" studio since 2007. The anchor sits behind a desk in front of a green screen, onto which a virtual reality studio is digitally projected. Cameras and tapes are cued and controlled from a centralized control centre—which was originally in Vancouver, but was moved in August 2008 to Edmonton. A number of the redundancies made in October 2007 were directly attributable to the introduction of this new technology.

Global Maritimes also had a 5:30 p.m. newscast called the Early News, but was cancelled as of early 2007 to make way for a full hour late-night newscast. The Early News was the first attempt by Global Maritimes to compete against CTV Atlantic's flagship news magazine program Live at 5. Global also had a noon lifestyle show called The Noon Show, which was cancelled due to low ratings.

On June 8, 2011, the station announced that Ron Kronstein would become the senior anchor/producer for both the Nova Scotia and New Brunswick editions of the Evening News; Kronstein was the former host of Live at 5 on ATV (now CTV Atlantic) until 2003. On the same day, the station provided more details about its upcoming Morning News, and announced that up to a dozen new reporters, producers, and videographers would be hired at its bureaus in Halifax, Sydney, Moncton, Saint John, and Fredericton.

On January 28, 2013, Global Maritimes launched a three-hour weekday morning program (initially airing from 6–9 a.m.) titled the Morning News (now Global News Morning), as part of an expansion of local news programming on Global owned-and-operated stations across Canada.

=== Notable former on-air staff ===
- Allan Rowe – evening anchor
- Janet Stewart – evening anchor

== Other programming ==
The Maritimes are located in the Atlantic Time Zone, which is one hour ahead of the Eastern Time Zone, where Global's CIII Toronto is located. In order to accommodate such a time zone difference and maximize simultaneous substitution opportunities with the American stations carried on cable, CHNB's prime time schedule deviates from that of most other Global O&Os, with some shows airing earlier in the evening, and occasionally on different nights, compared to other Global stations. (Global's stations in Alberta, which operate on Mountain Time but are in markets where the American network affiliates available on cable are on Pacific Time, usually have a very similar prime time schedule.)

== Technical information ==
=== Subchannel ===
Subchannel of CHNB-DT
Subchannel	Res.	Short name	Programming
12.1	1080i	CHNB-HD	Global

=== Transmitters ===
The station operates the following rebroadcast transmitters.

Station	City of licence	Channel	ERP	HAAT	Transmitter coordinates
CHNB-DT-1	Fredericton, NB	16 (UHF); 11 (VC)	28 kW	163.5 m (536 ft)	46°2′26″N 66°29′24″W
CHNB-DT-3	Moncton, NB	27 (UHF); 27 (VC)	86 kW	311.5 m (1,022 ft)	45°48′32″N 64°44′56″W
CHNB-TV-11	Woodstock, NB (Madawaska/Presque Isle, ME, USA)	38 (UHF)	51.9 kW	174.3 m (572 ft)	46°25′12″N 67°33′32″W
CHNB-TV-12	St. Stephen, NB	21 (UHF)	31.3 kW	240.8 m (790 ft)	45°10′15″N 66°54′28″W
CHNB-TV-13	Miramichi, NB	40 (UHF)	41.7 kW	119.1 m (391 ft)	47°3′20″N 65°29′17″W
CIHF-DT-14	Charlottetown, PEI	25 (UHF)	4.25 kW	146.0 m (479 ft)	46°21′52″N 63°24′36″W
