= Global News Morning =

- Title slide displayed on the Global News website
- Also known as: Former names: ITV First News (Edmonton, early 1990s–2000); The Breakfast Show (Calgary, early 1990s–2000); Global News Morning Edition (Calgary and Edmonton, 2000–2006); This Morning Live (Montreal, 2001–2008); Morning News (2006–2016); The Morning Show (Ontario, 2011–2019)
- Genre: Breakfast television
- Starring: Various presenters
- Country of origin: Canada
- Original language: English

Production
- Production locations: Burnaby, British Columbia; Calgary, Alberta; Edmonton, Alberta; Toronto, Ontario
- Production company: Global News

Original release
- Network: BCTV / Calgary 7 / ITV (1990s–2001); Global (2001–present)
- Release: present

Related
- News Hour

Global News Morning is the title used for weekday morning newscasts broadcast by the Global Television Network. Separate locally produced editions continue to air in British Columbia, Calgary and Edmonton, while a centralized Eastern and Prairie edition serves markets from the Maritimes west to Saskatchewan. The centralized program originates in Toronto and combines national and international news with market-specific local reporting, weather and other regional segments.

The program was previously branded as Morning News, with weekend editions titled Saturday Morning News and Sunday Morning News and an early weekday segment titled Early Morning News. In Ontario, the morning programs on Global Toronto, Global Kingston and Global Peterborough were branded as The Morning Show before adopting the Global News Morning name in 2019.

As part of Shaw Communications' benefits package arising from its acquisition of Global and other television properties from the bankrupt Canwest, Shaw committed to launching local morning programs on Global stations in Toronto, Winnipeg, Regina, Saskatoon, Montreal and the Maritimes. The commitment was fulfilled with the launch of the Montreal and Maritime editions on January 28, 2013.

On April 11, 2016, Global standardized the branding of its local morning newscasts, renaming Morning News, Saturday Morning News, Sunday Morning News and Early Morning News as Global News Morning. In June 2018, Global introduced an L-shaped on-screen information display across its morning programs, providing continuous weather, traffic, business and news headlines.

In July 2026, Corus Entertainment ended the separately produced morning editions in Toronto, Montreal, Halifax, Winnipeg, Saskatoon and Regina and replaced them with a centralized Eastern and Prairie edition. The British Columbia, Calgary and Edmonton editions remained locally produced.

== 2026 restructuring ==
In July 2026, Corus Entertainment announced that the local editions of Global News Morning serving its Prairie and Eastern markets would be consolidated into a single program by the end of the month. The centralized edition serves Toronto, Montreal, Halifax, Winnipeg, Saskatoon and Regina, combining local, regional, national and international news. Corus said that local reporters and locally focused weather forecasts would continue to be featured in each market.

The editions produced for Global BC, Global Calgary and Global Edmonton were not included in the consolidation and continued to provide morning programs dedicated to their respective markets.

== Current editions ==
=== Global BC ===
==== Weekdays ====
Global News Morning on Global BC airs from 5:00 to 9:00 AM PT on weekdays. It is simulcast on Global Okanagan. The weekday edition of Global News Morning is hosted by Jason Pires and Sonia Sunger as news anchors, Mark Madryga as meteorologist, and Katelin Owsianski as in studio traffic anchor with Amber Belzer in Global 1 for airborne traffic. Global News Morning is currently British Columbia's most-watched morning show.

==== Weekends ====
Global News Morning airs from 7:00 am – 10:00am on weekend mornings. This edition is hosted by Jennifer Palma with Steph Florian on weather and Jay Janower on sports.

=== Global Calgary ===
==== Weekdays ====
Global News Morning on Global Calgary airs weekdays at 5:00 to 9:00 AM MT. It is simulcast on Global Lethbridge. Global News Morning on Global Calgary is hosted by Bindu Suri, Blake Lough and Leslie Horton on weather and traffic.

==== Weekends ====
Global News Morning airs from 7:00 am – 10:00 am on weekend mornings. Global News Morning on the weekend is hosted by rotating reporters/anchors and weather specialist Britt Prendergast from Edmonton. .

=== Global Edmonton ===
==== Weekdays ====
Global News Morning on Global Edmonton airs weekdays from 5:00 AM to 9:00 AM MT. It was previously simulcast on CKSA Lloydminster until Global's disaffiliation in December 2021. It is the most watched morning show in Edmonton, consistently beating the nearest competition by a margin of 6 to 1. Global News Morning is hosted by Vinesh Pratap and Erin Chalmers with Daintre Christensen on traffic and weather.

==== Weekends ====
Global News Morning airs from 7:00 am – 10:00 am on weekend mornings. Global News Morning is hosted by rotating reporters/anchors and weather specialist Britt Prendegast .

=== Eastern and Prairie edition ===
The Eastern and Prairie edition of Global News Morning originates from Global's studios at Corus Quay in Toronto. Introduced in July 2026, it replaced separately produced local morning newscasts in Toronto, Winnipeg, Saskatoon, Regina, Montreal and the Maritimes as part of a network-wide restructuring by Corus Entertainment.

The program is hosted by Miranda Anthistle and Jaden Lee-Lincoln, with Ross Hull as meteorologist. It airs weekdays from 6:00 to 9:00 a.m. local time, except in the Atlantic provinces, where it airs from 7:00 to 10:00 a.m. The program combines local reporting and weather forecasts with national and international news, interviews and other segments.

== Former editions ==
=== Global Regina ===
Global News Morning on Global Regina aired weekdays from 6:00 to 9:00 a.m. local time. The program was hosted from Saskatoon by Chantal Wagner. The program, then known as Morning News, was launched in 2012 alongside the morning newscasts on Global Winnipeg and Global Saskatoon, after Shaw Media committed to launching morning programs in those markets, as well as in Toronto, Montreal and the Maritimes.

==== Former personalities ====
- Chantal Wagner – host

=== Global Saskatoon ===
Global News Morning on Global Saskatoon aired weekdays from 6:00 to 9:00 a.m. local time. It was launched in 2012 alongside the morning newscasts on Global Winnipeg and Global Regina, after Shaw Media committed to launching morning programs in those markets, as well as in Toronto, Montreal and the Maritimes.

==== Former personalities ====
- Chantal Wagner – host

=== Global Winnipeg ===
Global News Morning on Global Winnipeg aired weekday mornings from 6:00 to 9:00 a.m. It was simulcast on CJBN Kenora until that station closed in early 2017.

The program debuted on February 6, 2012, and initially featured Winnipeg's only television news helicopter, SkyView 1, which was later grounded. It was launched alongside the morning newscasts on Global Regina and Global Saskatoon, after Shaw Media committed to launching morning programs in those markets, as well as in Toronto, Montreal and the Maritimes.

Long-time weather specialist Mike Koncan announced on November 25, 2016, that he would leave the program to present weather on Global News at 6 and Global News at 10. Adriana Zhang joined the program as weather specialist on March 6, 2017, and remained until December 21, 2018, when she left Global Winnipeg for CTV Calgary.

On April 5, 2019, Shannon Cuciz announced that the following week would be her last with the program. Her final newscast aired on April 12, 2019, after which Malika Karim served as interim anchor for approximately six months.

==== Former personalities ====
- Holly Alexandruk – anchor
- Megan Bachelor – reporter and anchor
- Cole Deakin – reporter
- Brittany Greenslade – reporter and anchor
- Kevin Hirschfield – reporter
- Malika Karim – anchor
- Mike Koncan – weather specialist
- Eva Kovacs – anchor
- Fiona Odlum – SkyView 1 reporter
- Justine Routhier – SkyView 1 traffic reporter
- Derek Taylor – co-host and sports presenter
- Adriana Zhang – weather specialist
- Shannon Cuciz – anchor
- Gabrielle Marchand – anchor
- Corey Callaghan – field reporter

=== Global Toronto, Global Kingston and Global Peterborough ===
The Toronto edition of Global News Morning aired on Global Toronto from 6:00 to 9:00 a.m. ET on weekdays and was produced at Corus Quay in Toronto.

==== History ====
Global Toronto debuted a morning news program on July 14, 2003, under the title Global News Morning. It aired weekdays from 6:00 to 9:00 a.m. ET and was produced from the station's studios at 81 Barber Greene Road in Don Mills. The program was renamed Morning News in 2006 as part of Global's network-wide rebranding.

The newscast was cancelled in January 2009 because of low ratings and was replaced by a simulcast of then-sister station CHCH's Morning Live, originating in Hamilton, from 7:00 to 9:00 a.m. The simulcast ended in August 2009 after Canwest sold CHCH to Channel Zero, after which Global Toronto aired second-run lifestyle programming in the morning timeslot.

On June 1, 2011, Shaw Communications announced that it would relaunch a morning newscast on Global Toronto under the title The Morning Show, rather than using the Morning News title used by other Global owned-and-operated stations. Kris Reyes, Liza Fromer, Dave Gerry and Daru Dhillon were named as the anchors of the three-hour program, which debuted on October 11, 2011.

Dhillon left the program on August 27, 2012. On the same day, CIII launched The News at Noon. Antony Robart succeeded Dhillon, and The News at Noon was produced in the same Bloor Street studio as The Morning Show. On December 12, 2012, Global announced that The Morning Show would be expanded in early 2013 to include an additional half-hour broadcast nationally.

In June 2016, Fromer left the program after her contract was not renewed. Her position on the local edition was not filled, while Carolyn Mackenzie succeeded her on the national edition.

In 2017, Corus Entertainment launched local morning programs on CHEX Peterborough and CKWS Kingston, both branded as The Morning Show. The programs used a format similar to other Global morning newscasts east of Alberta, with national and international news segments supplied by Global Toronto.

On January 28, 2019, Corus announced that the national edition of The Morning Show would be expanded from 30 minutes to one hour beginning in March 2019.

On February 12, 2019, Corus announced that the local Toronto edition would be renamed Global News Morning. Jeff McArthur and Carolyn Mackenzie moved exclusively to the expanded national edition of The Morning Show, while Antony Robart, Jennifer Valentyne, Liem Vu and Marianne Dimain joined the local morning program. The changes took effect on March 4, 2019. The Kingston and Peterborough editions were rebranded as Global News Morning at the same time.

Valentyne was laid off in July 2020 and was later succeeded by Candace Daniel in 2021. The separately produced Toronto, Kingston and Peterborough editions ended in 2026 when they were incorporated into the centralized Eastern and Prairie edition.

==== Former personalities ====
- Miranda Anthistle – anchor
- Candace Daniel – anchor
- Marianne Dimain – reporter
- Daru Dhillon – anchor
- Liza Fromer – anchor
- Dave Gerry – anchor
- Robin Gill – anchor, 2008–2009
- Carolyn Mackenzie – anchor
- Jeff McArthur – anchor
- Anne-Marie Mediwake – anchor, 2006–2007
- Kris Reyes – anchor
- Antony Robart – anchor
- Ross Hull – meteorologist
- Jennifer Valentyne – anchor, 2019–2020
- Liem Vu – reporter and presenter

=== CHCH Hamilton ===
In 2000, Canwest acquired the broadcasting assets of Western International Communications, including CHCH, then branded as OnTV. The station relaunched as CH Hamilton in February 2001 and became part of the CH television system later that year.

CHCH debuted CH Morning Live on February 13, 2001. The program was renamed Morning Live in 2007 when the CH system became E!. It continued after Channel Zero acquired CHCH in 2009 and was not an edition of Global News Morning.

=== Global Montreal ===
Global News Morning on Global Montreal aired weekday mornings from 6:00 to 9:00 a.m. ET. It was produced from the station's studios in the Dominion Square Building in Downtown Montreal, as well as from locations in Montreal's West Island.

The program began on January 28, 2013, five years after the cancellation of the station's earlier morning program, This Morning Live. It launched alongside the morning newscast on Global Halifax, after Shaw Media committed to introducing morning programs in Montreal, the Maritimes, Winnipeg, Regina and Saskatoon.

==== History ====
After CKMI adopted the Global branding, it aired a live two-and-a-half-hour, and later three-hour, weekday morning magazine program titled This Morning Live. It aired in place of the cartoons carried by most Global stations on weekday mornings because Quebec law required children's programming broadcast over the air on weekdays to be commercial-free. The locally produced program also contributed Canadian content hours to the station's schedule.

The cancellation of This Morning Live was announced in late 2007, and its final episode aired on February 27, 2008. To partially replace the lost locally produced programming, the station reinstated News Final, which had previously been cancelled in June 2006 because of low ratings.

Camille Ross and Jessica Laventure both left Global News Morning in June 2016. Ross announced her departure on June 22 and left the following day to move to London, Ontario. Laventure left on June 30 to work in Punta Cana.

The separately produced Montreal edition ended in 2026 when it was incorporated into the centralized Eastern and Prairie edition.

==== Former personalities ====
- Laura Casella – anchor
- Jessica Laventure – weather specialist
- Camille Ross – anchor

=== Global Halifax ===
Global News Morning on Global Halifax aired weekday mornings in the Atlantic Time Zone. It was simulcast on Global New Brunswick and was produced in high definition from studios on Göttingen Street in downtown Halifax.

The program launched on January 28, 2013, alongside the morning newscast on Global Montreal, after Shaw Media committed to launching morning programs in Montreal, the Maritimes, Winnipeg, Regina and Saskatoon. The separately produced Maritime edition ended in 2026 when it was incorporated into the centralized Eastern and Prairie edition.

==== Former personalities ====
- Paul Brothers – host

== See also ==
- Global News
- Rival morning programs include:
  - Canada AM on CTV and CTV News Channel (now cancelled)
  - Your Morning on CTV and CTV News Channel (replacement for Canada AM)
  - CTV Morning Live on select CTV and CTV 2 local stations
  - Breakfast Television on Citytv
  - CBC News Now on CBC and CBC News Network
- News Hour
- The Morning Show
