= Carolyn Mackenzie =

Canadian television journalist

- Born: Toronto, Ontario, Canada
- Education: Carleton University
- Occupations: Reporter, journalist, writer
- Website: Carolyn Mackenzie on X

Carolyn Mackenzie (born in Toronto, Ontario) is a Canadian television journalist for Global News. She is currently the co-host for Global's Morning talk show program The Morning Show. She graduated from Carleton University in 1998 with a Bachelor of Journalism.

== Career ==
MacKenzie began her career as host of Rogers TV's Toronto Living. She then moved to Sydney, Nova Scotia where she worked as a videographer, reporter, camera operator and editor for ATV/CTV News. She moved to Barrie, Ontario and worked as an anchor for a new television station, New VR. In 2005, MacKenzie moved back to Toronto where she joined Global Television Network. The following year, she won an Edward R. Murrow Award for excellence in journalism for her coverage of transit inaccessibility.

MacKenzie has covered Queen Elizabeth's Jubilee Visit, reported on Toronto terror suspects, and achieved the "Best Spot News Story" for reporting on a home attack in Vaughan, Ontario.

In 2013, MacKenzie switched from anchoring Global's weekend news, to anchoring its weekday 11:00 pm news.

On 1 June 2015, Mackenzie moved to Global Television's The Morning Show.

== Personal life ==
MacKenzie and her firefighter husband Chris have two children. They live in Etobicoke, Toronto. Mackenzie is of Maltese and Scottish descent.
