= The Morning Show (Canadian TV program) =

Canadian breakfast television show

- Genre: Breakfast television
- Created by: Global Toronto
- Developed by: Corus Entertainment
- Presented by: Jeff McArthur; Carolyn Mackenzie
- Country of origin: Canada
- Original language: English

Production
- Production locations: Corus Quay (since November 21, 2016); 121 Bloor Street East, Toronto, Ontario (until September 16, 2016); ET Canada studio (September 19, 2016 to November 18, 2016) (temporary)
- Camera setup: Multiple
- Running time: 1 hour (3.5 hours until March 2019)

Original release
- Network: Global
- Release: October 11, 2011 – present

The Morning Show is a Canadian breakfast television show airing on Global. The program was first shown only on Global Toronto as a three-hour local morning show, but now serves exclusively as a national entertainment and lifestyle program. The program is hosted by Jeff McArthur and Carolyn Mackenzie. It debuted on October 11, 2011, from a ground level storefront studio at the Corus Entertainment Building (formerly Shaw Media Building) on 121 Bloor Street East in Downtown Toronto. On September 16, 2016, the show moved out of their Bloor Street Studio to the ET Canada studios. This was a temporary studio while a new one was being constructed at Corus Quay. The show moved to its new studios at Corus Quay on November 21, 2016.

From its launch to March 1, 2019, The Morning Show served as Global Toronto's local morning news program from 6:00 to 9:00 a.m., followed by a half-hour segment broadcast nationally at 9:00 a.m., with a focus on entertainment and lifestyle topics. On March 4, 2019, the national program was expanded to a full hour, while the Toronto portion was relaunched as Global News Morning (placing it in line with other Global stations), with Antony Robart and Jennifer Valentyne serving as anchors. The national edition was extended by half an hour and kept The Morning Show name.

In June 2026, Global announced plans to launch TMS2, a one-hour afternoon edition of the program to be hosted by Morgan Hoffman. The show, launching on September 8, subsequently announced Brad Smith as Hoffman's cohost, and Britnee Blair as an entertainment reporter.

== History ==
The show was launched on October 11, 2011, with Liza Fromer, who had been a co-host of Breakfast Television, and Dave Gerry as co-hosts. Kris Reyes from CityNews was hired as 'news anchor' reading the morning's news headlines and Daru Dhillon from CBC News as weather anchor. The show was called The Morning Show with Liza Fromer when it was launched, but the name was changed to The Morning Show.

Dave Gerry and Daru Dhillon departed the show in mid-2012, which led Kris Reyes to leave the position of newsreader for co-host alongside Liza Fromer. In the place of Gerry and Dhillon, former ABC News reporter Antony Robart joined the show as newsreader and former MSNBC weathercaster Rosey Edeh joined as weather anchor along with her current duties as news anchor at Global Toronto and reporter at ET Canada.

On June 5, 2013, Global Toronto's news anchor Leslie Roberts was announced as the co-host of the national edition of the show. Roberts resigned on January 15, 2015, following allegations of conflict of interest for allegedly promoting clients of his public relations firm on the air, including on The Morning Show.

On May 19, 2015, Jeff McArthur joined the show, replacing Kris Reyes, and Antony Robart departed from the show and was replaced by former News Hour Final anchor Carolyn Mackenzie on June 1, 2015.

The opening of the local edition of The Morning Show from 2016–2019

On June 28, 2016, Global News announced that they had not renewed co-host Liza Fromer's contract when it expired at the end of the month. No replacement was hired to fill the position. Carolyn Mackenzie took her place on the national edition.

The show moved from its studios at 121 Bloor Street East in September 2016. A new studio for the show was built at Corus Quay, which began being used on November 21, 2016. As a temporary studio, The Morning Show used ET Canada's studio.

On January 28, 2019, Corus Entertainment announced the expansion of the national edition of The Morning Show, extending the show's running time from half an hour to one hour beginning in early March 2019. On February 12, 2019, it was also announced that the local edition of The Morning Show from 6am-9am would be rebranded as Global News Morning, following the naming-scheme of other Global morning shows across the country. Additionally, hosts Jeff McArthur and Carolyn Mackenzie will move exclusively to the extended national edition of The Morning Show, while Global News at 11 co-anchor Antony Robart and former Breakfast Television host Jennifer Valentyne became the anchors of Global News Morning, along with Liem Vu and Marianne Dimain. The changes took place March 4, 2019.

== Show format ==
The program includes discussions of trending topics between the hosts, interviews with celebrities and other guests, musical performances, and lifestyle segments. New guests are brought in each day to talk about their lives, expertise, shows, or recordings that the guests may be promoting at the time.

As a local morning program, The Morning Show also included local news, weather, traffic, and current events, as well as interviews and performances from guests.

On December 12, 2012, it was announced that The Morning Show would be expanded in early 2013 to include an additional half-hour that would be broadcast nationally.

In 2015, due to a centralization initiative, national news segments, anchored by Jeff McArthur, from the Toronto production began to be shown as part of local morning shows on Global Regina, Saskatoon, Winnipeg, Montreal and Halifax.

An "L-Frame" format was introduced on the show, alongside other Global News Morning programs nationwide, on June 5, 2018. The new format, which is similar to that of CP24 and CHCH Morning Live, allows viewers to see news headlines, business headlines, weather, and traffic the entire show. This format was present on the local edition of the program, but was never present on the national edition of the show.

== Former personalities ==
=== Still at Global ===
- Antony Robart, now multi-market anchor of Global News at 11 for Global Toronto, Kingston, Peterborough, Montreal, Halifax, and New Brunswick. Returning as host of Global News Morning starting March 4, 2019.
- Liem Vu, now weather specialist with Global News Morning

=== No longer at Global ===
- Dave Gerry, now retired
- Daru Dhillon - general contractor and youtube home renovation host
- Leslie Roberts, resigned from Global in January 2015 due to allegations of potential conflict of interest; later as host on CJAD in Montreal 2016-2018; now working on web-based travel wellness site and on Youtube
- Kris Reyes - now reporter for CBC News based in New York
- Rosey Edeh, was anchor of Global News at Noon (2012-2016). Contract was not renewed with Global Toronto. She has been a co-host of CTV Morning Live Ottawa (rebranded as Your Morning Ottawa) on CTV2 since 2020.
- Liza Fromer - former morning co-host left the show in 2016 after contract not renewed. Since January 2025, she has been a co-host of The Boost on SiriusXM Canada.

== Global Kingston (CKWS-DT) and Global Peterborough (CHEX-DT) ==
In October 2016, Corus launched local versions of The Morning Show on its then-CTV affiliates CKWS-DT Kingston and CHEX-DT Peterborough (both of which have since become full-time Global O&O's). They follow a similar format to Global News Morning on fellow Global O&O stations, with national news inserts from Jeff McArthur in Toronto twice an hour.

== See also ==
- Global News
- Global News Morning (morning newscasts on Global stations in other regions)
- Canada AM (cancelled CTV morning newscast)
- Your Morning
- Breakfast Television
- CP24 Breakfast
- News Hour
