= Robert Fisher (journalist) =

Robert Fisher (born 1948) is a Canadian semi-retired radio and television journalist.

== Background ==
As a journalism student in the 1960s, he wrote his master's thesis on the then-emerging phenomenon of women in politics. His first job as a journalist was with CHWO, a local radio station in Oakville, Ontario, where he began working in 1967.

== Television career ==
Fisher worked for CBC Television in the 1980s as a Queen's Park reporter and host of Dateline Ontario for CBLT, until taking a job with the Global Television Network in 1988. While at Global, he hosted and produced the weekend program Focus Ontario on CIII in the 1980s and 1990s. He was also the network's first Queen's Park Bureau Chief, an anchor of the station's late night and weekend newscasts, and an occasional substitute anchor of First National.

He served on the journalist's panel for the election debates in the 1987 provincial election as a representative of the CBC, and in the provincial elections of 1990, 1995 and 1999 for Global. In the 1999 debate, his final question to Ontario Liberal Party leader Dalton McGuinty was perceived by some Liberals as unfair.

As well, he appeared as an analyst for the network's coverage of the federal elections in 1988, 1993 and 1997.

He was fired from Global in 2000 after criticizing what he perceived as the network's shift toward infotainment reporting. In a 2024 interview, Fisher said he believed Global's decision not to renew his contract was a result of a complaint he made internally that a Global News anchor being permitted to emcee a fundraiser for the Ontario Progressive Conservatives compromised Global News' reputation and has said that this complaint, as well as what he believed was an informal policy by CanWest Global to dismiss older staff so as not to have to pay them pensions, was behind his dismissal. Fisher sued CanWest for defamation over comments made by management in the wake of his termination and settled for an out of court payment.

== CBC Radio ==
He returned to CBC Radio shortly thereafter. He was an afternoon news anchor on CBLA, CBC Radio One's station in Toronto, appeared on the network's Ontario stations as a political analyst, continued to anchor provincial election coverage for that service in 2003, 2007, 2011 and 2014, and filed occasional science news reports, under the pseudonym "Dr. Robert", for the network's flagship interview program As It Happens.

Fisher has taught journalism law and ethics at Centennial College and radio and television news at Ryerson University.

In 2015, Fisher announced his retirement from journalism. His final day at CBC Radio was July 23.

He continues to contribute to CBC radio as a regular commentator on provincial politics for the network's Ontario stations. In a June 2017 appearance on CBC Sudbury's Morning North, he announced he would be returning to the network in September as a political analyst.
