= Clips (game show) =

1993 Canadian TV game show

- Genre: Game show
- Created by: Robert Essery
- Written by: Deborah Essery
- Presented by: Paul McGuire
- Starring: Krista Herman; Sarah Freudeman; Liza Fromer; Shaun Majumder; Andrea Menzies; Rob Pagetto
- Narrated by: Nicholas Picholas
- Composer: Nicholas Schnier
- Country of origin: Canada
- Original language: English
- No. of seasons: 4

Production
- Executive producer: Robert Essery
- Producer: Deborah Essery
- Production company: The Robert Essery Organization

Original release
- Network: YTV
- Release: March 1, 1993 – March 10, 1996

Related
- Video & Arcade Top 10

Clips (sometimes known as The Official Game of the Planet) is a Canadian game show that aired on YTV from 1993 to 1996 and produced by The Robert Essery Organization, as was the case for its sister show, Video & Arcade Top 10, which also aired on YTV at the time. Clips was hosted by future CMT host Paul McGuire and was joined by co-hosts such as Krista Herman, Sarah Freudeman, Liza Fromer, Shaun Majumder, Andrea Menzies, Rob Pagetto, and others, many of whom worked on V&A Top 10. Just like V&A, Clips was taped before a live studio audience in Toronto, Ontario.

== Rules ==
4 contestants competed to answer questions based on Movies, television, and Music. At the start of the game, Liza Fromer, later Shaun Majumder, gives out information for questions about several pop culture films, TV shows, music, and occasionally sports of the era with clips being provided. To start, McGuire asks a jump in question with the first person to buzz in getting a chance to answer. If he/she is right, they get 1 Clips star and a chance to earn up to 4 more by answering questions at each of the 4 colored stations (Purple, Red, Green or Blue). After a clip is played, the co-host at their station asked the question pertaining to that clip. If they answer wrong at any time, they must return to their podium and a new Jump in would be read. The contestant with the most Clips stars at the end of 3 minutes of gameplay wins a prize for themselves and a home player. In the event of a tie, one more toss up was read and the one who answered correctly would win.

Three such rounds are played during the show with 4 different contestants playing and a different prize offered in each round. The winning contestant who has won the most Clips stars would go on to the Big Wheel Round for a shot at the grand prize.

== Big Wheel Round ==
The winner of the first three rounds got a chance to spin an 8 colored space with 2 colors each. A clip will play on the colored station of where the wheel stops. If the contestant answers correctly on the final question, they win the grand prize.
