= Simultaneous substitution =

Canadian broadcasting practice

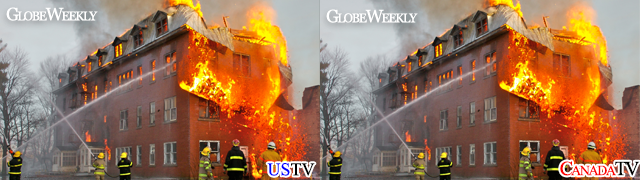
A simulated example of an imaginary TV show that appears on USTV in Canada before and after simultaneous substitution is implemented as requested by the Canadian network. Note CanadaTV's logo in the lower-right corner, replacing that of USTV.

Simultaneous substitution (also known as simsubbing or signal substitution) is a practice mandated by the Canadian Radio-television and Telecommunications Commission (CRTC) requiring broadcast distribution undertakings (BDUs) in Canada to distribute the signal of a local or regional over-the-air station in place of the signal of a foreign or non-local television station (typically one that is affiliated with a U.S. commercial television network such as ABC, CBS, NBC, and Fox), when the two stations are broadcasting identical programming simultaneously.

The CRTC first introduced the policy in 1972, and it is sometimes erroneously called "simulcasting", the name of a practice different from simultaneous substitution in that there is no signal replacement. According to the CRTC, the practice of simultaneous substitution is necessary "to protect the rights of broadcasters, to enable television stations to draw enough advertising revenue and to keep advertising money in the Canadian market". Canadian broadcast networks, which must request each and every substitution on an individual basis, have been criticized for exploiting the regulation and not investing enough money into Canadian content.

The most prominent public criticism of simsubs has been centred around the Super Bowl—the championship game of the National Football League—which is well known for featuring high-profile commercials on its U.S. broadcast. In 2015, citing the ads as having become an "integral part" of the broadcast, the CRTC announced that it would implement a policy to prevent broadcasters from requesting simsubs for the game; it was officially implemented prior to Super Bowl LI in 2017. This has faced criticism over the change in policy from the game's Canadian rightsholder, CTV owner Bell Media; the company argued that it singled out a specific program for policy in violation of the Broadcasting Act, and devalued its rights to the league. Bell Media subsequently fought this policy in court, and it was overturned by the Supreme Court of Canada on December 19, 2019.

== History ==
During the 1950s, the Canadian Broadcasting Corporation (CBC) had a monopoly on television broadcasting in Canada (its first television station, CBFT, began operating in Montreal in 1952). In 1960, the Board of Broadcast Governors, the predecessor of the CRTC, began granting licences for commercial stations in order to provide an alternative to the CBC. These broadcasters began operating in 1961, and through international distributors, acquired the domestic broadcast rights to many American television programs.

Since about 30% of the Canadian population – those who resided close enough to the Canada–US border – had access to over-the-air broadcast signals from networks based in both Canada and the United States, they could choose to watch American programs on either a Canadian or an American network. Many of these Canadians chose to watch the American network (either CBS, ABC or NBC) rather than the Canadian networks' broadcasts. Consequently, many Canadian broadcasters began broadcasting programs purchased from American-based broadcast networks before they aired on the American networks to attract more viewers and to earn money from domestic advertising, and some Canadian businesses that advertised on the domestic stations also purchased broadcast time on the American stations that were receivable in the same areas, although federal legislation was eventually passed that limited the tax-deductibility of these purchases.

Several of the stations in smaller border markets in the United States openly targeted the larger cities in Canada by getting as close to the border as possible as border blasters. Examples include most of the stations in the Buffalo, New York television market, which targeted Toronto and the Golden Horseshoe region, and in the most extreme case, Pembina, North Dakota, station KCND-TV (channel 12), which was based in a town with fewer than 1,000 residents but made its money by targeting the much larger city of Winnipeg across the border to its north.

When cable television began to proliferate across Canada, viewers far from the Canada–US border obtained clear access to American television services. By the early 1970s Canadians, who watched four hours a day of television on average, chose American channels up to two thirds of the time; only National Hockey League on television reliably drew Canadians to domestic channels. The domestic channels also heavily purchased American productions. When Canadian content regulations required them to broadcast a certain amount of domestic production, the channels scheduled American programs earlier in the evening, hoping that audiences would stay for the less popular Canadian programs. In 1972, in response to pressure from Canadian broadcasters, the CRTC introduced the simultaneous substitution regulation as a method to circumvent diminution of the value of Canadian networks' exclusive broadcast rights to American programs; within three years, KCND was effectively moved to Winnipeg and relicensed as CKND-TV. Through the 1990s, as direct-broadcast satellite television services gained popularity and then were granted licences in Canada, simultaneous substitution became a requirement on these as well.

By the late 1990s and early 2000s, the simultaneous substitution regulation had reached its full potential, with Canadian broadcast networks telecasting nearly all of their American programming at the same time as the U.S. network's broadcasts to ensure maximum eligibility to request substitution.

== Effects ==
The high incidence of simultaneous substitution requests by privately owned Canadian television networks to draw advertising revenue has had profound effects on various spectrums, ranging from Canadian network schedules to portions of programming being lost due to mistimed substitutions.

=== Network schedules ===
Since private Canadian broadcast networks such as CTV, Global, CTV 2, and Citytv often rely heavily on American programs, their programming schedules are often effectively dictated by the schedules of corresponding United States network broadcasters. For example, if a U.S. broadcaster moves a series to a new time slot, the Canadian broadcaster that holds domestic rights to carry first-run episodes of that program would need to move its broadcast to correspond with the new time slot if it wished to exercise its simultaneous substitution rights.

Many American networks telecast their most popular programming during prime time, meaning that in order to maximize simsubbing opportunities, Canadian private broadcasters are often unable or unwilling to broadcast their own original programming during these hours. As a result, Canadian content programming is commonly scheduled as a secondary concern, to fill holes where an American program cannot be placed for substitution. This issue has also extended beyond scripted entertainment programming – all three major networks in Canada have faced criticism for at least one incident in which the network seemingly deemed a live Canadian news or cultural awards program to be less important than simsubbing an American reality television series:

- In 2006, CBC Television received criticism after it announced plans to bump its primary network newscast, The National, to a later time slot one night a week to broadcast the short-lived singing competition series The One: Making a Music Star.
- In 2007, CTV was forced to back down on a plan to tape-delay the 2007 Juno Awards to maintain its simsubbing rights to an episode of The Amazing Race.

Since 2008, CTVglobemedia (now Bell Media) has held both the exclusive rights to the Canadian Football League and the rights to Sunday afternoon and playoff games of the American National Football League, broadcasting most NFL games on CTV, while relegating CFL games (including the Grey Cup) to cable channel TSN, making CFL games unavailable on broadcast television for the first time in Canadian history. The move was in part due to the desire to gain simsubbing rights over the NFL broadcasts, something that was not necessary for CFL games because, as of 2015, those games are only available on cable television in the United States.

=== Portions of programming lost ===
Due to the high number of simultaneous substitutions requested by Canadian broadcasters, portions of programs are sometimes lost. This may occur for a variety of reasons, including the cable provider erroneously timing the substitution or substituting over the incorrect distant signal, the Canadian broadcaster making a scheduling error when requesting a substitution, the American broadcaster making a last minute change to its schedule, or adverse weather conditions sometimes affecting a Canadian station's local signal. In addition, should a Canadian network interrupt its programming to provide information on a breaking news event while simsubbing an American show, the American program cannot be telecast.

With the increasingly common practice of American networks extending programs by one to two minutes into the start of the next hour in order to avoid audience loss, such errors are sometimes unavoidable if the Canadian station is not able to match the altered start time. This slight differentiation in timing between the Canadian and American stations can lead to a short period during which the Canadian viewer is watching the original American station's signal before the Canadian network starts its simsubbing, resulting in the show's jumping back to the start again. This is not a problem for American viewers who choose to watch the same network across time slots, but Canadian viewers could miss critical content. The timing is often rectified by tape delaying the overlaid content and forgoing a minute of ad time in the following commercial break to quickly catch back up with the American broadcast.

=== High-definition television ===
High-definition television signals must also be simultaneously substituted, although this only applies if a local over-the-air digital transmitter that broadcasts HD content is receivable in the market served by the local cable provider. Since many broadcasters were only required to convert their main, typically major-market transmitters during the 2011 digital television transition in Canada, this means that HD simsubbing is not currently enforceable in many rural areas.

Although the CRTC's policy regarding simultaneous substitutions for high definition broadcasts do not require them to be applied if the quality of the Canadian feed is not equal or better than the American feed, there have been instances in which inferior Canadian feeds were substituted over higher-quality American feeds. In such cases, complaints can be filed to the CRTC, whereas the commission will confer with the applicable BDU and Canadian network about the issue.

A partially transparent NBC logo is seen on the left. An opaque, grey CTV Two bug partially covering the NBC logo is seen on the right.

=== On-screen graphics ===
Implementation of simultaneous substitutions can also cause issues involving digital on-screen graphics (e.g., a "bug”) applied by the originating broadcaster; if a clean feed of the program is not available (particularly for live programming), the Canadian broadcaster will often place their own bug in a different corner of the screen, or not add one at all. CTV and CTV Two occasionally used an opaque logo to cover the logo bugs of US-based networks on simsubbed broadcasts of The View on CTV and The Tonight Show on CTV Two, but have since discontinued this practice.

== Implementation and exceptions ==
Enforcement, or lack thereof, of the regulations, as well as legal exceptions and simple circumstance, has led to instances where some Canadian cable and satellite subscribers are able to receive the original American channels in Canada without simultaneous substitution. Cable providers with less than 2000 subscribers are not legally required to have simultaneous substitution implemented. Many viewers in the Greater Toronto Area can pick up American stations from Buffalo, New York, over-the-air, as well as high-definition versions of the stations from both Buffalo and Seattle, Washington, on cable television. Similarly, cable television viewers in Greater Vancouver may receive unmatched HD stations from Detroit, Michigan, and Rochester, New York. However, high-definition feeds are also subject to simsub, and such substitutions began to increase as local broadcasters performed wider deployments of digital terrestrial television.

=== Rule changes and Super Bowl simsub ban ===
On January 29, 2015, the CRTC announced changes to the simsub rules as a result of Let's Talk TV, a series of hearings which mulled reforms for the Canadian television industry. While the CRTC did not completely eliminate the simsub rules, "despite certain reservations", it did propose that its policies explicitly state that only over-the-air channels may invoke simsubs, and that broadcasters and television providers be accountable for programming lost from improperly implemented simsubs: providers will be required to provide rebates as compensation, and stations could temporarily lose their ability to simsub programming. The CRTC also proposed that, citing viewer complaints over their inability to see what they felt was an "integral part" of the event, and that many ads were often seen multiple times throughout the game, it would ban the use of simultaneous substitution for the Super Bowl beginning in 2017, thus allowing U.S. feeds of the event and its commercials to co-exist with Canadian simulcasts. However, Bell Media, the current Canadian rightsholder to the Super Bowl through CTV, filed an appeal, arguing that the move would devalue its exclusive broadcast rights to the game, and violates the Broadcasting Act, which forbids the CRTC from making regulations that single out specific programs. The NFL itself has backed Bell Media's complaints.

The order implementing these new rules was issued on August 19, 2016. The prohibition only applies to the game itself; the typically extended pre-game and post-game coverage is not covered by the policy, and thus may still be simsubbed by CTV. On November 2, 2016, after being denied an appeal because the CRTC had not yet issued official policy when the suit was filed, Bell was granted the right to appeal the ruling in the Federal Court of Appeal. The telecast of Super Bowl LI was available directly from Fox affiliates carried on pay television in Canada.

Michael Geist of the University of Ottawa believed that this decision was a test case for eventually phasing out the simsub rules entirely, arguing that the practice was becoming increasingly irrelevant due to changing viewing habits (such as the consumption of TV content via video-on-demand services rather than linear networks), and that dropping the rules could force domestic broadcasters to make greater investments into original, Canadian content, rather than scheduling it as an afterthought around fluctuating U.S. schedules.

On May 18, 2017, the NFL testified to the United States Department of Commerce that the CRTC's August 2016 ruling was a violation of copyright protections under NAFTA. The NFL and BCE continued to fight to overturn this policy in the Federal Court of Appeal.

On December 19, 2017, the Federal Court of Appeal dismissed Bell Media's case, ruling that the CRTC's policy was reasonable. Bell Media once again filed for an appeal in January 2018, this time in the Supreme Court of Canada.

On May 10, 2018, the Supreme Court of Canada agreed to hear the NFL and Bell's appeal of the Federal Court of Appeal's decision. In an unprecedented step, the top court announced that it intended to use this appeal as an opportunity to revisit the law governing standard of review of administrative tribunals. The appeal was tentatively scheduled to be heard in December 2018.

On October 1, 2018, Canada agreed to the United States–Mexico–Canada Agreement. The trade deal, which replaces NAFTA, contains an annexe that would require the CRTC to apply its simsub policies equally across the programming that it covers, and as such, withdraw its policy forbidding simsubs of the Super Bowl. NFL commissioner Roger Goodell had lobbied for the condition, and praised U.S. president Donald Trump after the agreement was announced. Following the announcement of the trade deal, Bell requested that the CRTC withdraw the policy in time for Super Bowl LIII; Bell was denied due to the pending Supreme Court appeals hearing, as well as the fact that the agreement had not yet been ratified.

On December 19, 2019, the Supreme Court of Canada ruled in favour of Bell Media, arguing that the CRTC overstepped its power under the Broadcasting Act by attempting to "impose terms and conditions on the distribution of programming services generally". Therefore, Super Bowl LIV in 2020 was subject to simsub.

=== Specific television providers ===
In terms of television providers, the practice of simsubbing is implemented in different ways, depending on the company, especially in the case of satellite providers, which operate on a national basis and not regionally as cable providers do;

- Shaw Direct invokes simsubs according to a subscriber's postal code, and is implemented by the receiver's firmware; this method enforces simsubs only in areas where they are legally needed. Beginning in February 2012, however, Shaw Direct began implementing simsubs for the Global network's HD feed (channel 256) for all of their high-definition subscribers, which affects ABC East HD (WXYZ-TV), CBS East HD (WWJ-TV), Fox East HD (WUHF) and NBC East HD (WDIV-TV). It is speculated that this is due to the 2010 purchase of the Global Television Network by Shaw Communications. At first, no other channels were simsubbed; Shaw Direct later began implementing simsubs for Citytv, but it still does not do so for CTV, its main competitor.
- Bell Satellite TV invokes simsubs to all subscribers nationwide, implemented by its uplink centre (which also provides services for other service providers); by doing so, simsubs for a particular channel are implemented nationwide, regardless of where the subscriber lives or which feed the subscriber watches. Notably, Bell's feeds also invoked simsubs on network programming being simulcast by specialty channels owned by Bell Media, such as TSN. This has since ceased due to CRTC rules that explicitly forbid this practice.
- Similarly, Rogers Cable invoked simsubs on U.S. network affiliates for sports programming simulcast on its Sportsnet specialty channels (such as the 2013 World Series on Fox in lieu of the MLB International feed). Sportsnet has since reverted to using the MLB International feed, tying into the current involvement of Sportsnet personality Buck Martinez (who serves as play-by-play commentator for Sportsnet's regular-season broadcasts of the Toronto Blue Jays).

== Other uses ==
Although simultaneous substitution was conceived to substitute the signal of a foreign station, the practice has been applied as well to substitute the signal of an out-of-market Canadian station in a given market. For example, in Montreal, the signal of Ottawa station CJOH-DT (channel 13) has frequently been substituted by the signal of locally based CFCF-DT (channel 12), even though both stations are part of the CTV network. Another example, Bell Aliant Fibe TV subscribers in Newfoundland and Labrador regularly have Global Television Network stations in Halifax and Toronto (and, very rarely, Vancouver) simsubbed with NTV; Maritime Fibe subscribers, however, often have NTV simsubbed with Global Halifax or New Brunswick, depending on where they live.

Simultaneous substitution has also been implemented on French language television stations. From the 1980s to the mid-1990s, TVA's flagship Montreal station CFTM-TV (channel 10) had its signal substituting that of its Sherbrooke sister station CHLT-TV (channel 7) (which was receivable in the Montreal area until 1995 on cable services).
