= The List (Canadian TV program) =

- Starring: Liza Fromer
- Country of origin: Canada
- No. of seasons: 2
- No. of episodes: 26

Production
- Executive producers: Claire Van Polder; Glen Salzman
- Producers: John Vandervelde; Katherine Buck
- Running time: 22 mins. (approx)

Original release
- Network: Slice (Canada)
- Release: November 13, 2007 – July 25, 2008

The List is a Canadian reality television series, which debuted on November 13, 2007, on Slice. Hosted by Liza Fromer, the show will give participants the opportunity to live out a dream or goal.
