= Flick Flack =

Canadian television series

- Genre: Documentary/Talk show
- Presented by: William Shatner
- Country of origin: Canada
- Original language: English
- No. of seasons: 1

Production
- Producers: Henry Comor; Garth Drabinsky
- Running time: 30 minutes

Original release
- Network: Global
- Release: 7 January 1974 – June 1974

Flick Flack is a Canadian television series broadcast by Global Television Network in 1974. The series featured interviews with motion picture industry personalities combined with excerpts from films. William Shatner was the regular series host.

== Episodes ==
Flick Flack was among the first series to be broadcast on the Global Television Network. It premiered on 7 January 1974, one day after Global's inaugural broadcasts, with an episode that featured animals in film. Its first regular timeslot was on Fridays at 10 p.m. starting with an 18 January 1974 episode featuring Mel Brooks and Anne Bancroft.

Episodes featured topics such as science fiction films (1 March), animal performers (15 March), Paramount Studios (29 March, repeated 1 June) and the Canadian film industry (14 April). Personalities included costume designer Edith Head (22 February 1974) and an episode with directors George Cukor, John Schlesinger (26 May 1974). "Above the Line" (8 February 1974) featured interviews with director John Frankenheimer, actor Richard Harris, writer Garson Kanin and producer Martin Ransohoff.

The series moved to a Sunday 6:30 p.m. time slot from 5 May 1974 and was dropped from Global's schedule later that year. Global cancelled Flick Flack and 14 other Canadian series in May 1974 and the series was dropped from the schedule after June 1974.

== Production ==
Actor William Shatner (of Star Trek fame) hosted this series. Producer Henry Comor was able to use material from archives of most Hollywood studios except those of MGM. The debut episode was originally scheduled to feature Jack Lemmon, but was complicated due to a dispute between United Artists and Global. The studio withdrew approval for Flick Flack's use of clips from The Apartment and Some Like It Hot, movies which illustrated some of Lemmon's career. The first broadcast episode on 7 January 1974 instead featured the topic of animal performers.

== Reception ==
Frank Penn of the Ottawa Citizen noted that Shatner was "well-suited to his host-instructor role" in the series. The Windsor Star deemed the show as "must-viewing for movie buffs". Blaik Kirby of The Globe and Mail took a positive view of Flick Flack, noting that it "seems set to become one of Global's top Canadian-made shows, one with definite international sales potential."
