= Mike Anscombe =

Canadian broadcaster

Mike Anscombe is a Canadian broadcaster who appeared on the Global Television Network between 1974 and 1997 as a news anchor; most notably as one of the "Three Nice Guys" when he co-anchored Global's noon newscast with John Dawe and Bob McAdorey. He is a former host of CBC Sports Hockey Night in Canada games involving the Montreal Canadiens and most recently was the host of Leafs TV's Once a Leaf.

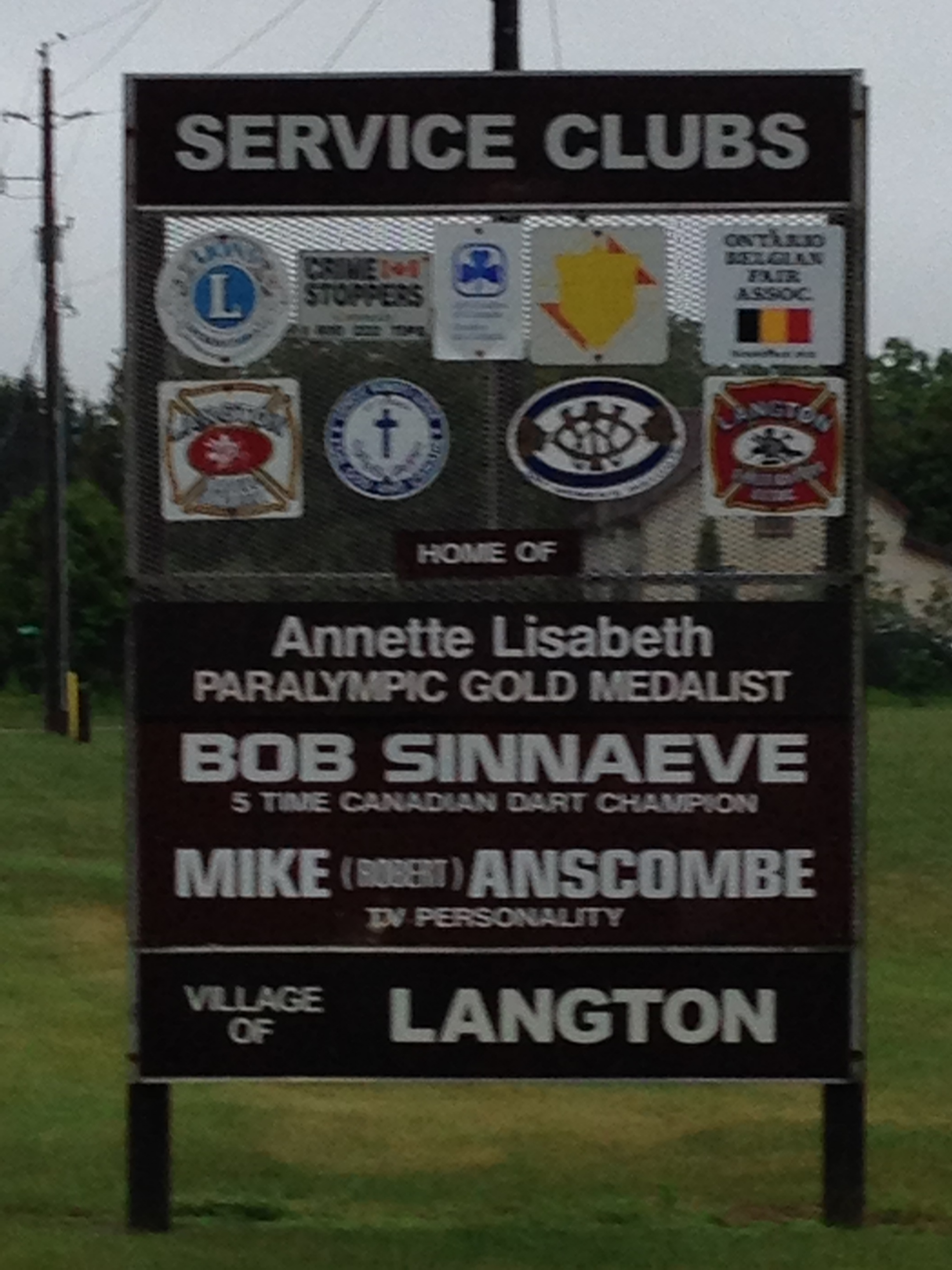
Mike Anscombe's hometown of Langton, Ontario
