= Video & Arcade Top 10 =

Canadian game show

- Genre: Game show
- Created by: Robert Essery
- Presented by: Gordon Michael Woolvett (1991–1993); Nicholas Picholas (1993–2006)
- Country of origin: Canada
- Original language: English

Production
- Production company: The Robert Essery Organization

Original release
- Network: YTV
- Release: September 7, 1991 – 2006

Related
- Clips

Video & Arcade Top 10 is a Canadian children's game show broadcast on YTV from 1991 to 2006. It was a competitive game show in which contestants played against each other in video games for prizes, with assorted brief segments on current video games, music, films and fashion.

The series was hosted by then-YTV PJ Gordon Michael Woolvett, after which he was replaced by then-CFNY radio DJ Nicholas Schimmelpenninck, known as Nicholas Picholas, who had previously presented the first two seasons' music segments. The show featured five children contestants competitively playing video games for prizes.

== Gameplay and content ==
In the show, contestants would competitively play video games on monitors in the studio. During competition, the hosts offered tips and tricks on how to play better in video games. The winner at the end of the competition would compete for prizes that changed along the wall. As the games were often new and most of the players would not have played them previous them, they were occasionally given time to try the games beforehand. If players were stuck in a game, the show's staff would assist them so they could progress.

The show also featured brief segments promoting new films, music videos, fashion, fan mail, and popularity rankings of the latest video games.

== Production ==
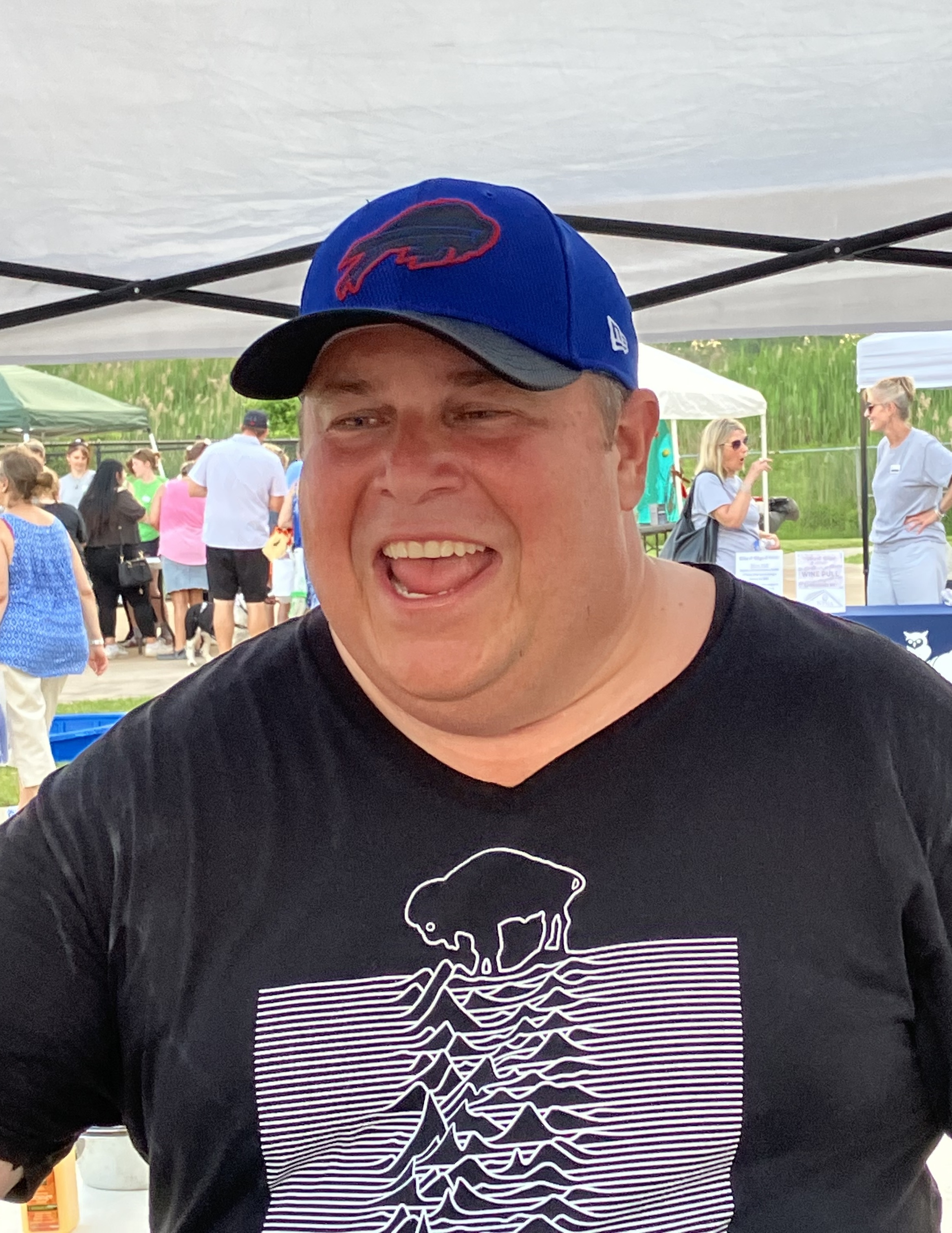
Nicolas Picholas in June 2022. Picholas hosted the Video & Arcade Top 10 from the second season until its final season in 2006.

Video & Arcade Top 10 was among the many video game-themed children's game shows that began in the early 1990s such as the American production Video Power (1990-1992), Australia's A*mazing (1994-1998) and Britain's GamesMaster (1992-1998).

The program premiered on September 7, 1991 on YTV. The debut season was hosted by Gordon Michael Woolvett, a Hamilton-born actor. Other early co-hosts included Joel Keller, Liza Fromer, David J. Phillips, and Elissa Mills. Nicholas Schimmelpenninck, a Toronto-based DJ for CFNY radio, initially joined the show to discuss new music. Under the name Nicholas Picholas, he became the new host during the show's second season until the final season in 2006.

Filming of the program had involved one day recording sessions of about six episodes at a time. This led to about 12 different games in competitions each recording day. As the show targeted for younger audiences, Picholas said that the production struggled to find appropriate games at the time as many of the popular games were too violent for a children's program on YTV. Picholas described the games played on towards the end of the run as being "children’s games—toddler, single digit kids game—because you couldn't play anything else. Everything else had this intense violence."

The producer of the show as Robert Essery. Essery and his company had produced several independent Canadian television shows as well as the Genie Awards. Picholas said he was not privy to the inner-workings of the program, but said that Essery "made good money" and described the show as "product placement, from what I could see."

== Reception ==
Lee Bacchus of The Province complimented the show for "its shunning of traditional game-show glibness" as while noting the contestants did not have much to say when interviewed, they were refreshing over the "perma-smiled Chuck Woolery-types" of other game shows.
