= Bob McAdorey =

Canadian broadcaster

Robert Joseph McAdorey (July 24, 1935 – February 5, 2005) was a Canadian television and radio broadcaster, most noted for his roles as a radio DJ for Toronto radio station CHUM in the 1960s, and as an entertainment reporter for the Global Television Network in the 1980s and 1990s.

== Background ==
McAdorey was born and raised in Niagara Falls, Ontario. He attended Stamford Collegiate, where as a Catholic he was one of just two students exempted from the Protestant school's religious classes, alongside the Jewish Barbara Frum. He got his start in broadcasting with local radio station CHVC as a copywriter and advertising announcer.

While at CHVC, his quick thinking salvaged a Christmas broadcast that was going awry; the announcer playing Santa Claus was drunk and behaving obnoxiously, to the point that the actress playing Mrs. Claus was refusing to work with him, and McAdorey immediately jumped in to play "Sammy Snowflake" so that Santa could be pulled off the air. Within a few weeks, he was the station's new on-air morning host.

He subsequently worked in various other media markets including Dawson Creek, British Columbia, and Guelph, Ontario. While in Guelph, he also served a two-year term on Guelph City Council.

In his early career he was often described as looking like Buddy Holly, while as he aged he was occasionally mistaken in public for Kenneth D. Taylor.

== CHUM ==
McAdorey joined CHUM in 1961 as the afternoon host and program director. In this role, he became one of the most influential radio personalities in all of Canada in the era, with the Toronto Telegram writing in 1966 that "Bob McAdorey, whose face is as well known in Toronto as Mayor Givens, has the most power to dictate what pop music Ontario teens listen to."

McAdorey and his CHUM colleagues Mike Darow, John Spragge and Garry Ferrier sometimes performed together as a pop vocal quartet called The CHUMingbirds, who recorded the single "Brotherhood of Man" for release on Quality Records in 1964. In this era, he was also the host of the teen dance show Hi Time on CFTO.

When the station moved to a more strictly formatted, less personality-centred sound in 1968, McAdorey left the station, and later worked at CFGM and CFTR.

== Television career ==
McAdorey joined the fledgling Global Television Network in Ontario in 1976 on contract producing humorous pieces for Global's newscast, and hosted a late-night satirical news commentary show, Mac, from 1979 to 1980.

Beginning in 1981 he appeared as co-anchor with John Dawe and Mike Anscombe of the station's News at Noon. The show's concept was to reinvent the idea of a noon-hour newscast, adding entertainment and lifestyle features instead of just rehashing the headlines; by 1983 the show was being hailed for its "three nice guys" vibe and was attracting unusually strong ratings for a noon-hour newscast. McAdorey was briefly fired from the station in 1983 for filing a report which management deemed inappropriately humorous and unprofessional, but was hired back within days after many of the station's viewers called and wrote letters in protest. He was also a contributor to the station's other newscasts as an entertainment reporter.

From 1991 to 1997 he also hosted Entertainment Desk, a half-hour daytime entertainment news show. In 1995, when Stamford Collegiate launched a new media production program, it named a production studio in honour of McAdorey, alongside facilities named in honour of Frum and another famous alumnus, James Cameron. In late 1996 he was forced to take a medical leave of absence for several weeks after suffering a head injury in a fall.

In July 2000, he retired, against his wishes, from Global due to the station's policy at the time of mandatory retirement at 65.

McAdorey returned briefly in 2001 to give movie reviews, but spent most of his final years in Niagara-on-the-Lake, Ontario.

== Death ==
In February 2005, he died in a hospital in St. Catharines, Ontario after a prolonged illness, at the age of 69.

He had one daughter, Colleen, who was married to McAdorey's television colleague Jim Tatti. His wife Willa, and two other children, predeceased him.

He was also the uncle of Michelle McAdorey, a singer and songwriter who led the band Crash Vegas in the 1980s and 1990s.
