= CIHF-DT =

Television station in Halifax, Nova Scotia

- Halifax, Nova Scotia; Canada
- Channels: Digital: 8 (VHF); Virtual: 8
- Branding: Global Halifax

Programming
- Affiliations: 8.1: Global

Ownership
- Owner: Corus Entertainment; (Corus Television Limited Partnership)
- Sister stations: CHNB-DT

History
- First air date: September 5, 1988
- Former call signs: CIHF-TV (1988–2011)
- Former channel numbers: Analog: 8 (VHF, 1988–2011)
- Former affiliations: Independent (1988–1997)
- Call sign meaning: Irving family (station's original owner); Halifax & Fredericton

Technical information
- Licensing authority: CRTC
- ERP: 1 kW
- HAAT: 241.0 m (791 ft)
- Transmitter coordinates: 44°39′3″N 63°39′26″W
- Translator(s): see § Transmitters

Links
- Website: Global Halifax

CIHF-DT (channel 8) is a television station in Halifax, Nova Scotia, Canada, owned and operated by the Global Television Network, a division of Corus Entertainment. It is sister to CHNB-DT in Saint John, New Brunswick, and the two stations share a studio on Gottingen Street in downtown Halifax; CIHF-DT's transmitter is located on Washmill Lake Drive on the city's west side.

== History ==
CIHF-TV was launched on September 5, 1988, and was initially owned by the Irving family of Saint John, New Brunswick and their New Brunswick Broadcasting Company. It was co-owned with Saint John-based CHSJ-TV, the CBC Television affiliate for all of New Brunswick. The station initially had only one transmitter, in Halifax; it served the rest of Nova Scotia via cable. When MITV launched, it took all prime time American shows from CBC station CBHT—reportedly a prelude to the CBC dropping all prime time American programming nationwide.

It was a sister station to CIHF-TV-2 in Saint John. Both stations were branded as MITV (Maritimes Independent Television), and their schedules were almost identical. However, the stations offered separate newscasts to their respective provinces and opportunities for advertisers to buy ad space on one or both stations. Furthermore, although the Saint John station's callsign made it appear that it was a rebroadcaster of the Halifax station, both stations were separately licensed by the Canadian Radio-television and Telecommunications Commission (CRTC). At the time, MITV was the only over-the-air independent television station in the area, with studios and main operation centre in Halifax, and all other functions in Saint John. As MITV shared owners with CHSJ-TV, a popular joke in the Maritimes was that MITV stood for "More Irving Television".

In 1989, retransmitters were added in Bridgewater, Truro, and Wolfville. The transmitter network was expanded further in 1993 to include service to Shelburne, Sydney, New Glasgow, and Yarmouth.

After losing CA$5 million each year since sign-on, MITV was sold to Canwest on August 29, 1994. This was part of a three-way deal, which saw the CBC taking control of CHSJ-TV, moving it to Fredericton, and renaming it CBAT, making it a full CBC O&O. Later in the year, MITV moved its operational and business headquarters to Halifax.

Former logo of Global Maritimes, from 1997 to 2006.

In 1995, MITV's Saint John offices were moved out of the old CHSJ building and into a new facility in Brunswick Square. Within a year of new ownership and its resulting reorganization and marketing focus, the station became profitable for the first time in its short history. In August 1997, when Canwest rebranded its stations as the Global Television Network, MITV became Global Maritimes.

Logo of Global Maritimes, from 2006–2013.

Additional retransmitters signed on in 1998, in Mulgrave and Antigonish.

In October 2007, approximately forty employees at Global Maritimes were laid off as part of a wider restructuring of the Global Television Network and introduction of centralized news broadcast facilities.

On December 17, 2012, Global Maritimes officially began operations at its new home on Göttingen Street in Downtown Halifax. Previously, its operations were located on Akerley Boulevard in an industrial park in the Halifax suburb of Dartmouth.

In April 2013, CIHF was rebranded as Global Halifax, while sister station CIHF-2 in Saint John was rebranded as Global New Brunswick, marking the first time the stations have not used the same brand. The stations began producing separate nightly newscasts in addition to their already existing separate evening newscasts, and a new senior correspondent was hired for Global New Brunswick. The stations will continue to share news-gathering resources and anchors. Despite the separate branding, the two stations' non-news schedules remain virtually identical, except for separate idents and commercials.

On April 1, 2016, Shaw Media was sold to Corus Entertainment.

== News operation ==
Global Halifax airs three local newscasts: Global News Morning from 6–10 a.m. on weekdays is presented by Paul Brothers from Global's Halifax studios; the flagship Global News at 6 is presented from Global's Montreal studios by Aalia Adam; and Global News at 11 is presented from Global's News Centre in Toronto. Global News at 6 is followed by Global National at 6:30 p.m. On Saturdays and Sundays, Global Halifax and Global New Brunswick share a combined Global News at 6 and Global News at 11, also presented from Toronto, under the Global Maritimes brand. All of these news programs are broadcast in 16:9 high definition.

Along with a growing number of other Global stations, CIHF has used a "virtual" studio since March 2008. The anchor sits behind a desk in front of a green screen, onto which a virtual reality studio is digitally inserted. Cameras and tapes are cued and controlled from a centralized control centre—which was originally in Vancouver, but was moved in August 2008 to Edmonton. A number of the redundancies made in October 2007 were directly attributable to the introduction of this new technology.

Global Maritimes also had a 5:30 p.m. newscast called the Early News, but was cancelled as of early 2007 to make way for a full hour late-night newscast. The Early News was the first attempt by Global Maritimes to compete against CTV Atlantic's flagship news magazine program Live at 5. Global also had a noon lifestyle show called The Noon Show (later called Global Noon), which was cancelled due to low ratings.

On June 8, 2011, the station announced that Ron Kronstein would become the senior anchor/producer for both the Nova Scotia and New Brunswick editions of the Evening News; Kronstein was the former host of Live at 5 on ATV (now CTV Atlantic) until 2003. On the same day, the station provided more details about its upcoming Morning News, and announced that up to a dozen new reporters, producers, and videographers would be hired at its bureaus in Halifax, Sydney, Moncton, Saint John, and Fredericton.

On January 28, 2013, Global Maritimes launched a three-hour weekday morning program (initially airing from 6 to 9 a.m.) titled the Morning News, as part of an expansion of local news programming on Global owned-and-operated stations across Canada.

Since 2016, Global Halifax has not had a weather anchor for their 6 p.m. newscast and instead relies on Global Toronto's chief meteorologist Anthony Farnell for the weather reports.

Global Halifax temporarily ceased presentation of its evening newscasts from Halifax on February 15, 2018. This came after the departure of anchor Ron Kronstein to Peterborough, Ontario, to work for CHEX-DT. Global News at 6 was temporarily presented from its Toronto news centre. Local presentation for the weekday edition of Global News at 6 returned to Halifax in August 2018, with the hiring of news anchor Sarah Ritchie from CTV Atlantic.

On September 6, 2022, Global named Aalia Adam as the new presenter of Global News at 6 for Halifax and New Brunswick, in addition to her role as the presenter of Global Montreal's 5:30 and 6:30 p.m. newscasts. This resulted in presentation of the weekday Halifax and New Brunswick 6 p.m. newscasts to be moved to Global's studios in Montreal.

=== Notable former on-air staff ===
- Allan Rowe – evening anchor
- Janet Stewart – evening anchor

== Other programming ==
The Maritimes are located in the Atlantic Time Zone, which is one hour ahead of the Eastern Time Zone, where Global's CIII Toronto is located. In order to accommodate such a time zone difference and maximize simultaneous substitution opportunities with the American stations carried on cable, CIHF's prime time schedule deviates from that of most other Global O&Os, with some shows airing earlier in the evening, and occasionally on different nights, compared to other Global stations. (Global's stations in Alberta, which operate on Mountain Time but are in markets where the American network affiliates available on cable are on Pacific Time, usually have a very similar prime time schedule.)

== Technical information ==
=== Subchannel ===
Subchannel of CIHF-DT
Subchannel	Res.	Short name	Programming
8.1	1080i	CIHF-HD	Global

=== Transmitters ===
The station operates the following rebroadcast transmitters.

Station	City of licence	Channel	ERP	HAAT	Transmitter coordinates
CIHF-TV-4	Truro	18 (UHF)	17.9 kW	195.4 m (641 ft)	45°18′35″N 63°20′1″W
CIHF-DT-5	Wolfville	20 (UHF); 20 (VC)	166 kW	218 m (715 ft)	45°2′39″N 64°21′19″W
CIHF-TV-6	Bridgewater	9 (VHF)	13.9 kW	164.5 m (540 ft)	44°23′17″N 64°40′44″W
CIHF-DT-7	Sydney	27 (UHF); 36 (VC)	36 kW	190 m (623 ft)	46°5′53″N 60°18′43″W
CIHF-TV-8	New Glasgow	34 (UHF)	18.8 kW	190.7 m (626 ft)	45°28′54″N 62°33′47″W
CIHF-TV-9	Shelburne	10 (VHF)	3.9 kW	113.2 m (371 ft)	43°46′9″N 65°20′57″W
CIHF-TV-10	Yarmouth	45 (UHF)	66.4 kW	167.3 m (549 ft)	43°54′56″N 66°5′16″W
CIHF-TV-15	Antigonish	21 (UHF)	37.8 kW	208.1 m (683 ft)	45°38′26″N 62°7′32″W
CIHF-TV-16	Mulgrave	28 (UHF)	2.65 kW	128.4 m (421 ft)	45°35′56″N 61°24′44″W
