= Liza Fromer =

Canadian television presenter

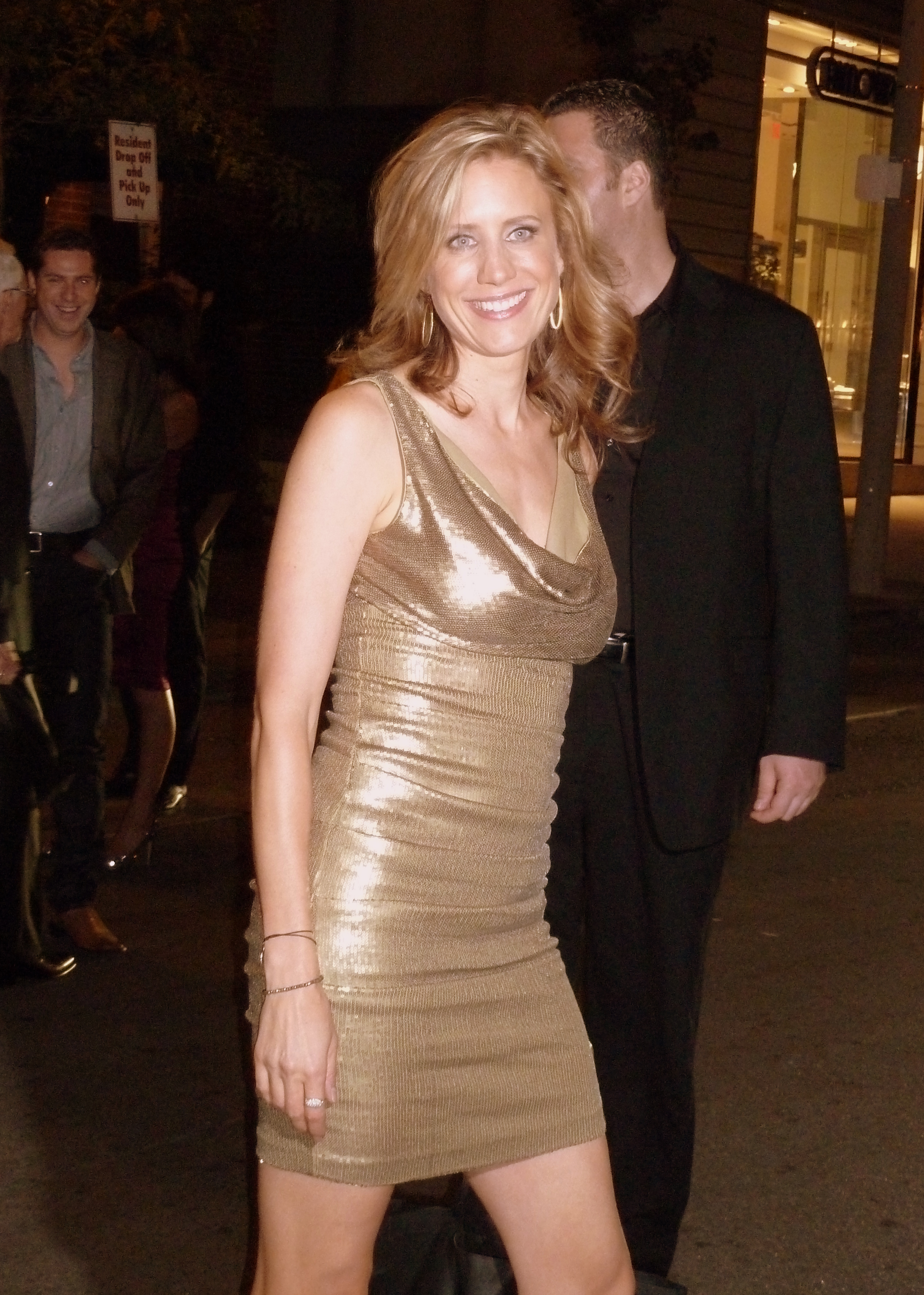
- Liza Fromer, Instyle Party Toronto Film Festival 2011
- Born: Liza Fromer; March 18, 1970 (age 56); Kitchener, Ontario, Canada
- Education: Ryerson University (B.A.)
- Years active: 2002–2016
- Spouse: Josh Gerstein 2005-2012
- Website: https://twitter.com/LizaFromer

Liza Fromer (born March 18, 1970) is a former cohost of The Morning Show on the Global Television Network and Breakfast Television at Citytv in Toronto, Ontario, Canada.

She graduated from Ryerson University with a degree in Radio and Television and is a Canadian broadcast journalist. Previously, she worked as a video game columnist for TV Guide Canada. Her first foray into broadcasting was driving the Q107 Community Cruiser. She later launched her television career at YTV as the co-host of both the Video & Arcade Top 10 and Clips. From 1995 to 1997, she hosted Good Morning Toronto on The Weather Network and later became the weekend anchor and reporter at A-Channel in Calgary, anchoring the station's first-ever newscast. Fromer has also had stints with The Discovery Channel, CBS's Newspath, and has appeared in several ads.

Fromer appeared on the cover of the Fall/Winter 2005 issue of Today's Bride, as part of an article where she discussed her wedding.

In January 2006, she announced that she was pregnant with her first child. She and her husband had a son in 2006. She subsequently announced her departure from Breakfast Television.

In April 2007, Alliance Atlantis Communications announced that Fromer would appear, in the fall of 2007, in a prime-time series on the Slice specialty channel (formerly the Life Network) called The List.

On September 23, 2009, it was announced that Fromer would be a member of the new John Moore morning show on Newstalk 1010 in Toronto beginning on October 5, 2009.

On May 31, 2011, Fromer was announced as the cohost of The Morning Show on Global Television Network. The program debuted in October 2011.

On June 28, 2016, Global News announced that they would not be renewing Liza Fromer's contract after it expired at the month's end. Fromer no longer works for Global Toronto. She now is an MC and moderator with Key Note Speaker Canada as well as a children's book author.

== Filmography ==
- Magnus Opus (2003)
- Sanctuary (1997) as an Anchorwoman
