= Janet Stewart (broadcaster) =

Janet Stewart (born March 3, 1967) has been the news anchor at CBWT in Winnipeg, Manitoba, Canada since January 9, 2007.

Prior to that, she was news anchor at CKY-TV between August 2001 and November 2006.

Before she moved to Winnipeg, Stewart worked at CTV Halifax, and Global Maritimes also as news reporter and anchor.

== Awards ==
In January 2014, Stewart was nominated for a Canadian Screen Award for Best Local News Anchor by the Academy of Canadian Cinema and Television. She has also been nominated for a Best News Anchor Gemini Award.
