= CIII-DT =

Television station in Toronto

- Toronto, Ontario (Note: Originally licensed to Paris, Ontario; moved to Toronto in 2009.); Canada
- Channels: Digital: 17 (UHF); Virtual: 41
- Branding: Global Toronto or Global (general); Global News (newscasts)

Programming
- Affiliations: 41.1: Global

Ownership
- Owner: Corus Entertainment; (Corus Television Limited Partnership)
- Sister stations: CFIQ, CFNY-FM, CILQ-FM

History
- First air date: January 6, 1974
- Former call signs: CKGN-TV (1974–1984); CIII-TV (1984–2011)
- Former channel numbers: Analog: 22 (UHF, 1974–1988), 41 (UHF, 1988–2011); Digital: 65 (UHF, 2009–2011), 41 (UHF, 2011–2020)
- Former affiliations: Independent (1974–1997)
- Call sign meaning: "III" = Roman numeral 3, a reference to Global being Canada's third (English) television network, as well as the station's channel position on many Ontario cable systems

Technical information
- Licensing authority: CRTC
- ERP: 59.8 kW
- HAAT: 506 m (1,660 ft)
- Transmitter coordinates: 43°38′33″N 79°23′14″W
- Translator(s): see § Transmitters

Links
- Website: Global Toronto

CIII-DT (channel 41, cable channel 3) is a television station in Toronto, Ontario, Canada, serving as the flagship station of the Global Television Network, a division of Corus Entertainment. The station maintains studios at 81 Barber Greene Road (near Leslie Street) in the Don Mills district of Toronto, and its transmitter is located atop the CN Tower in downtown Toronto.

The station reaches much of the population of Ontario through a network of 12 transmitters across primarily the southern and central portions of the province (as a result, it is the de facto Global outlet for the capital city of Ottawa through repeater CIII-DT-6). Since August 29, 2022, CIII-DT serves as the master control hub for all 15 Global owned-and-operated stations across Canada.

== History ==
Ken Soble, the founder of CHCH-TV in Hamilton, envisioned a national "superstation" of 96 satellite-fed transmitters with CHCH as its flagship. In 1966, he filed the first application with the Board of Broadcast Governors for a network to be branded as NTV—however, the application faced various regulatory hurdles and underwent numerous revisions over the next number of years. The Canadian Radio-television and Telecommunications Commission (CRTC) eventually decided to go ahead with the publicly owned Anik satellite system instead of relying on private communications companies to build Canada's satellite broadcasting infrastructure, placing the NTV application in jeopardy after Power Corporation of Canada, a key investor in the plan, backed out.

In 1970, one of Soble's former employees, Al Bruner, teamed up with Peter Hill to revive the application under new ownership. Bruner and Hill's group, Global Communications, scaled back the original NTV proposal to a network of seven transmitters in Southern Ontario, whose combined footprint would have provided at least secondary broadcast coverage from Montreal to Detroit. Global Communications still aspired to eventually build out Soble's original 97-station network, and viewed the seven-transmitter Ontario chain as an interim step. However, since CHCH was no longer involved in the application, Global's iteration of the plan also required the launch of a new station to serve as its flagship.

The station first signed on the air on January 6, 1974, as CKGN-TV (before its use by the station, the CKGN callsign had previously been used by what is now CTV owned-and-operated station CKNY-TV in North Bay from 1955 to 1962). It branded itself as the "Global Television Network," a name which reflected its then-unprecedented coverage of most of Southern Ontario from six transmitters (a seventh that would have provided a strong secondary signal to Montreal was turned down) fed from a centralized studio. From its launch in 1974 until 2009, the station's main transmitter was licensed to Paris, a small town near Brantford, but Toronto became the station's primary city of licence following a licence amendment in 2009. Through its entire history, however, the station's main studio facility has been based in a converted factory (built in 1954 for Barber Greene Canada Limited) in the Don Mills area of North York (since 1998, located in Toronto).

It had hoped to be distinct from CBC and CTV by airing a number of its own Canadian-made programs. Three months later, however, many of these programs had been cancelled due to deep financial problems. It had made a serious blunder by signing on in the middle of the 1973–74 television season, and prospective advertisers did not have the money to spare for commercial spots. It barely registered as a blip in the ratings; in Toronto, for instance, it only drew a 2.5 share, just a fraction of those drawn by CBC and CTV. Its line of credit was yanked, and it was unable to meet daily expenses.

Amid losses of over a million dollars a month, the network was bailed out by two conglomerates in March 1974 – a Toronto-based group headed by Allan Slaight and a Winnipeg-based group headed by Izzy Asper and Paul Morton. By the fall, Global was forced to scrap its ambitious business model just to survive. Instead, it replaced the cancelled shows with American imports. With as much non-Canadian content as legally allowed (at the time, Canadian content regulations required stations to broadcast domestically produced programs for 60% of its overall schedule, and 50% during prime time), Global essentially became a clone of CTV.

Asper's group bought controlling interest in 1977, making them first western owners of a major Canadian broadcaster. In 1989, Asper and Morton tried to buy out each other's shares, and the Court of Queen's Bench of Manitoba ended the contest by ordering a sale of shares by auction, which allowed Asper and his company, Canwest, to take full ownership.

First logo as "Global Ontario", used from August 1997 to February 2006.

The station's callsign was changed to CIII-TV in January 1984, in accordance with its 10th anniversary of broadcasting. The Windsor/Cottam transmitter would be an exception to the rebroadcasters that were also assigned the CIII calls that month for a few years as it continued to be identified in CRTC documents as CKGN-TV-1, perhaps because of licensing issues with nearby broadcasters in the Detroit market (the CKGN calls are now used by an FM radio station in Kapuskasing, Ontario).

Shaw Communications purchased CIII, along with the rest of the network, from Canwest Global in 2010, forming Shaw Media as Global's parent company. Shaw, in turn, merged Shaw Media into sister company Corus Entertainment in 2016.

Second logo as "Global Ontario", used from 2006 to 2009.

== News operation ==
CIII-DT presently broadcasts 30 hours, 55 minutes of locally produced newscasts each week (with 5 hours, 35 minutes each weekday and 1 1/2 hours each on Saturdays and Sundays). In addition to its main news department in Toronto, the station also operates a news bureau at the National Press Centre in Ottawa. CIII does not employ its own sports reporters; sports news content was formerly provided by sports specialty channel Sportsnet 360.

Early on, its flagship news program Global News was developed under the guidance of Bill Cunningham, a veteran of CBC News; in the beginning, the newscast was anchored by Peter Trueman in Toronto and Peter Desbarats in Ottawa. During the news department's early years, its newscasts were one of the most successful and important programs that CKGN/CIII had. Trueman has noted in his memoir that the programme was groundbreaking: "Our newsroom-studio combination ... served as a model for the new CHAN-TV facilities in Vancouver, and it is currently [1979] the inspiration for Ted Turner's new Cablenews operation in Atlanta". The CBC also looked to it for inspiration when it changed its national news format in the early 1980s. The programme also pioneered the use of "regional correspondents," usually print or radio journalists, who would regularly advise the station about stories in their part of Ontario. This allowed field producers and a Global crew to target key stories of the day. "This is the main reason that much of Global's ex-urban coverage has been so effective", Trueman wrote in 1979.

During the 1980s, Global greatly expanded its news operation, with a 90-minute block of news starting at 5:30 p.m., as well as newscasts at noon and 11 p.m. By the end of the 1980s, the noon newscast was simply titled News at Noon, the 5:30 newscast was called First News, the 6 p.m. newscast was called The Six O'Clock Report, and the 11 p.m. newscast was titled The World Tonight. Trueman left CIII in 1988. Other anchors on the station over the years have included Mike Anscombe, Beverly Thomson, John Dawe, Jane Gilbert, Peter Kent, Loretta Sullivan, Bob McAdorey, Thalia Assuras and Anne-Marie Mediwake.

From 1994 to 2001, CIII also produced First National, which was anchored by Peter Kent and aired at 6:30 p.m. weeknights. In 2001, the program was replaced by Canada Tonight, which in turn was replaced that fall with Global National, anchored by Kevin Newman; it originated from CHAN's facility in Vancouver before moving to a dedicated studio in Ottawa in February 2008. In January 2009, CIII cancelled its weekday morning newscast Global News Morning, along with the Noon News Hour, with the former being discontinued due to low ratings and both programs being dropped due to cost-cutting measures at certain Global stations. From February to August 2009, CIII simulcast former Hamilton sister station CHCH-TV's Morning Live newscast each weekday from 7 to 9 a.m. The CHCH simulcast was later dropped after Canwest sold that station to Channel Zero, with CIII airing second-run lifestyle programming in the morning timeslot, as well as rebroadcasts of the previous night's News Hour Final.

On October 11, 2011, CIII-DT launched a three-hour weekday morning newscast titled The Morning Show, running from 6 to 9 a.m., which broadcasts from a storefront studio at Shaw Media's Bloor Street building in Downtown Toronto. The station also moved its early evening newscast, News Hour, a half-hour earlier to 5:30 p.m. to coincide with a shift of Global National to the 6:30 p.m. slot, joining Montreal's CKMI-DT and Halifax's CIHF-DT as the only Global stations to carry the network's national newscast in that timeslot.

On August 27, 2012, CIII restored a midday newscast to its schedule with the launch of a half-hour weekday noon newscast. Unlike the existing lunch hour newscasts carried on Global's sister stations, the newscast airs for 30 minutes instead of one hour. The expansions to CIII's news programming were part of a benefits package that was included as a condition of the sale of the Global Television Network to Shaw Communications.

In June 2016, Global News announced that The Morning Show co-host Liza Fromer would not have her contract renewed after five years with the station. Fromer was the only original host of The Morning Show remaining from when the show launched in 2011. No replacement was hired to fill her position. Another layoff was with Global News at Noon anchor Rosey Edeh. Neither anchor works with the station anymore.

=== Former local news programs ===
- The Morning Show – airing from 6–9:30 a.m. ET weekdays. The show is hosted by Carolyn Mackenzie, Jeff McArthur and Liem Vu at a studio at Corus Quay. Carolyn Mackenzie anchored local news, Jeff McArthur anchored national news, and Liem Vu reported on social media news and weather. Jeff McArthur's national news segment is also aired on Global News Morning shows on Global Halifax, Montreal, Winnipeg, Saskatoon, and Regina. The 9–9:30 portion of the show is also aired nationally after local Global News Morning programs, however the run-time has since been extended to one hour. The national one-hour show kept The Morning Show branding, while it was dropped locally.

=== Notable former on-air staff ===
- Mike Anscombe – news and sports anchor (1974–1997)
- Tim Bolen – weather presenter (2011)
- Peter Desbarats – anchor until 1980
- Rosey Edeh – anchor of Global News at Noon (2012–2016), co-host of The Morning Show (2012–2015)
- Robert Fisher – reporter, host of Focus Ontario
- Liza Fromer – co-host of The Morning Show (2011–2016)
- Peter Kent – national anchor, (1992–2001)
- Gord Martineau – co-anchor during his brief stint in 1980s away from Citytv
- Bob McAdorey – entertainment anchor (1980–2000), co-anchor of News at Noon for 14 years
- Anne Mroczkowski – co-anchor of News Hour (2010–2013)
- Leslie Roberts – The Morning Show – National Edition (weekday mornings anchor) and News Hour (weeknights anchor)
- Jan Tennant – local anchor (1982–1987)
- Peter Trueman – evening news anchor (1974–1988)

== Technical information ==
=== Subchannel ===
Subchannel of CIII-DT
Subchannel	Res.	Short name	Programming
41.1	1080i	CIII-HD	Global

=== Analog-to-digital conversion ===
CIII-TV-41 in Toronto began broadcasting its digital signal in July 2009. The station's analog signal, over UHF channel 41, was shut down on August 31, 2011, the official date on which Canadian television stations in CRTC-designated mandatory markets transitioned from analog to digital broadcasts. CIII's digital signal was relocated from its pre-transition UHF channel 65, as its original digital channel was among the high band UHF channels (52–69) that were removed from broadcasting use as a result of the transition, to UHF channel 41.

Global also transitioned CIII-TV in Paris, CIII-TV-6 in Ottawa and CIII-TV-7 in Midland (serving Barrie) to digital on August 31, 2011. CIII-TV-22 in Stevenson (serving Windsor and Chatham) converted to digital on August 8, 2011. The transmitter operates at a reduced power and its coverage area has been reduced. CIII-TV-55 in Fort Erie vacated its channel frequency on August 31, 2011, as Global decided to shut down that transmitter. Coverage to the areas in Canada served by the Fort Erie transmitter are provided by CIII-DT-41. Global plans on transitioning its remaining transmitters to digital by 2016, though all of CIII-DT's transmitters except for its Bancroft transmitter are to be converted to digital by February 2013.

Shortly after the 2011 digital transition, an additional digital subchannel (41.2) was launched, carrying a standard definition feed of CIII-DT, which fully duplicated the existing programming on 41.1. However (unlike other Toronto-area stations), this SD feed was not simply a letterboxed or cropped version of the HD feed, instead having different placement for promotional graphics and a separate on-screen bug (without an "HD" annotation). It is therefore possible that the SD feed needed to be broadcast over-the-air in order to continue carriage of this dedicated feed on cable and satellite providers (however, it also served as a benefit to some over-the-air viewers with 4:3 television sets and digital converters, insofar as it allowed those viewers to avoid older 4:3 programs appearing both letterboxed and pillarboxed). In late spring 2018, CIII-DT ceased broadcasting digital subchannel 41.2.

On April 10, 2012, Shaw Media applied for permission to change CIII-DT-6's allocation from VHF channel 6 to UHF channel 14, switching from circular to elliptical polarization, citing the VHF-Low band's impulse noise (compared to the VHF-High and UHF bands) causing reception issues, which would be mostly resolved with a higher frequency. The power would be increased substantially, from 3.3 kW, to 145 kW. The application states that it may be short-spaced to Buffalo, New York's WUTV, and Plattsburgh, New York's WPTZ, both of which may be subject to (and cause) some co-channel interference on the fringes of CIII-DT-6's service area. This application was approved by the CRTC on July 4, 2012. CIII-DT-6 officially moved to channel 14 in mid-August 2013.

Shaw Media had begun applying for permission to convert its transmitters in Northern Ontario to digital, with CFGC-TV in Sudbury and CFGC-TV-2 in North Bay on June 14, and CIII-TV-12 in Sault Ste. Marie on June 22. The application for CIII-TV-12 included switching its digital allotment from VHF channel 7 to UHF channel 15, for improved signal quality and a slightly increased population coverage. The application for CFGC-DT-2 requested the use of UHF channel 15, instead of UHF channel 32, as CHCH-TV-6 currently uses that frequency. The digital channel for CFGC-TV has not yet been requested. All three transmitters are to be fed via satellite.

Following the shutdown of the Radio-Canada repeater in Kitchener (CBLFT-TV-8) which had been assigned the UHF channel 17 allocation, Shaw had applied on October 10, 2012, to move its CIII-DT digital transmitter in Paris from VHF channel 6 to UHF channel 17, to vastly improve its coverage to the Kitchener area. Technical parameters included in the change would be a boost in power and slight decrease in height (4 kW at 311.3 meters on VHF channel 6, compared to 165 kW (average of 97 kW) at 272 meters on UHF channel 17). The UHF signal would have a slightly smaller range of broadcast coverage, but Shaw had admitted that areas on the fringes would still be able to receive Global programming via CIII-DT-29, CIII-DT-41 and CIII-TV-4. The application was approved by the CRTC on January 22, 2013. CIII-DT-27 Peterborough/Cobourg could on most days be seen from as far away as Rochester, New York, on channel 27.1.

In January 2020, the transmitter power of CIII-TV-2 (Bancroft) was temporarily reduced to prevent an overload caused by high VSWR at the site. On December 4, 2020, the CRTC approved a request from Corus Entertainment to shut down CIII-DT-27 and CIII-TV-2 (among other Global retransmitters) in favour of multiplexing CIII-DT-27 via CHEX-DT and CIII-TV-2 via CKWS-DT Kingston. This decision saw the CRTC abandon a promise made in 2010 to have the owners of Global Television transition CIII-TV-2 to digital. CIII-TV-2 continued to operate as an NTSC analog retransmitter until August 31, 2022. The CIII-TV-2 transmitter that operated out of Vennachar for close to 50 years was possibly the last over the air analog transmitter to rebroadcast Global in Ontario. It is unclear what Industry Canada will now use VHF channel 11, the spectrum that had been allocated for CIII-TV-2 digital, for. Despite gaining approval to close CIII-DT-27, it remains on air.

=== Transmitters ===
Station	City of licence	Channel (RF / VC)	ERP	HAAT	Transmitter coordinates
CIII-DT	Paris	23 (UHF); 6	97 kW	272 m (892 ft)	43°15′41″N 80°26′41″W
CIII-DT-2	Kingston (via CKWS-DT)	11 (VHF); 2	9.4 kW	312.5 m (1,025 ft)	44°9′59″N 76°25′28″W
CIII-DT-4	Owen Sound	26 (UHF); 4	192 kW	132.0 m (433 ft)	44°26′45″N 80°59′59″W
CIII-DT-6	Ottawa	14 (UHF); 6	145 kW	261.3 m (857 ft)	45°30′9″N 75°50′59″W
CIII-DT-7	Midland	7 (VHF); 7	6.75 kW	346.7 m (1,137 ft)	44°58′14″N 79°46′57″W
CIII-DT-12	Sault Ste. Marie	15 (UHF); 12	6 kW	132 m (433 ft)	46°35′50″N 84°16′53″W
CIII-DT-13	Timmins	13 (VHF); 13	30 kW	175 m (574 ft)	48°28′12″N 81°17′49″W
CIII-DT-22	Stevenson	33 (UHF); 22	36 kW	110 m (361 ft)	42°3′41″N 82°29′5″W
CIII-DT-27	Peterborough (via CHEX-DT)	12 (VHF); 27	20 kW	316.5 m (1,038 ft)	44°19′42″N 78°17′58″W
CIII-DT-29	Sarnia–Oil Springs	35 (UHF); 29	208 kW	194 m (636 ft)	42°43′21″N 82°9′59″W
CIII-DT-41	Toronto	17 (UHF); 41	59.8 kW	506 m (1,660 ft)	43°38′33″N 79°23′14″W
CFGC-DT	Sudbury	11 (VHF); 11	11.7 kW	141.5 m (464 ft)	46°30′19″N 80°57′33″W
CFGC-DT-2	North Bay	15 (UHF); 2	16.8 kW	92.8 m (304 ft)	46°18′10″N 79°24′39″W

A series of rebroadcast transmitters relay the CIII signal to much of Ontario. Most of these use the CIII base callsign followed by a number to denote their status as rebroadcasters, except in Sudbury and North Bay where the CFGC callsign is assigned. The most likely explanation for using CFGC is that the close resemblance between the number 1 and the letter I would make CIII-TV-11 an undesirable call sign for Sudbury, while North Bay could not use CIII-TV-2 as that call sign is already in use in Bancroft.

Six transmitters formed the original 1974 service:

- CKGN-TV channel 6 from Paris (serving Hamilton, Brantford and Kitchener–Waterloo)
- CKGN-TV-1 channel 22 from Cottam (near Windsor; also serving Detroit, Michigan)
- CKGN-TV-2 channel 2 from Bancroft (serving Belleville)
- CKGN-TV-6 channel 6 from Gatineau, Quebec (Camp Fortune site, near Ottawa)
- CKGN-TV-22 channel 22 from Uxbridge (near Toronto)
- CKGN-TV-29 channel 29 from Oil Springs (near Sarnia)

Original plans called for a seventh transmitter, CKGN-TV-36 from Maxville, near Cornwall. It would have primarily served Hawkesbury, but would have also provided a fairly strong grade B signal to Montreal. However, Global was forced to drop the Maxville transmitter from its proposal due to a CRTC moratorium on new stations in Montreal. One columnist noted that language and political considerations meant the CRTC would not entertain such a service before Montreal had three French-language TV stations.

The Cottam transmitter was beset by legal difficulties. Since it served Windsor, it was considered to be part of the Detroit market, in which Global did not hold the rights for all of its programming. While Global initially was able to supply alternate programming to the Cottam site, its initial financial difficulties prompted it to instead begin showing a slide during preempted shows, which often made up significant portions of the network's prime time lineup. The network quoted the cost of continuing to provide alternate programming to Windsor at $800,000 a year. At the same time, in an attempt to disclaim competition with American outlets, Global ceased sending listings to Detroit's newspapers.

On August 29, 1977, the Cottam transmitter suffered an electrical fire that caused $300,000 in damage and took it out of commission. After considering restoring service from Cottam and finding issues with securing an appropriate transmitter and its insurance claim, the network began to contemplate ways of improving its service to Windsor. Further delays were incurred when concerns arose about potential polychlorinated biphenyl contamination of the site. In 1981, Global sought permission to build a higher-power successor to the Cottam station for the Windsor–Detroit market; the CRTC denied this application in December of that year.

In 1986, the CRTC approved the relocation of the Cottam transmitter to Stevenson. Some time after this, the callsign CIII-TV-22 from the now-defunct Uxbridge transmitter were reassigned to the Stevenson transmitter, which then was activated in November 1988. The transmitter is located southwest of Wheatley, between Wheatley and Leamington, but its signal is aimed northeast (towards Chatham–Kent), and barely reaches Windsor and Detroit – presumably to protect the Detroit stations. In the early 1990s, additional transmitters were added to expand Global's footprint in Ontario.

The Uxbridge transmitter was Canada's most powerful UHF transmitter, operating at the maximum allowable power of 5 megawatts. In 1986, Global won approval to move the Uxbridge transmitter to channel 41 in Toronto proper under the new calls CIII-TV-41, broadcasting from the CN Tower. The Toronto transmitter was activated on October 22, 1988. A month later, the Uxbridge transmitter dropped regular programming, remaining online to promote its successor on channel 41 until it was deactivated on December 31. For all intents and purposes, given that the station has always been based in (Metro) Toronto, this was CIII's main transmitter and Global's flagship long before the station officially moved its licence to Toronto in 2009. This was the case with the Uxbridge transmitter as well. Starting in 2008, a year before the licence moved to Toronto, CIII began sending its signal to the Toronto transmitter first, since the Paris transmitter did not yet have digital capability.

Other transmitters were gradually introduced, including (launch dates in parentheses):

- CIII-TV-7 channel 7 from Midland (November 1987, serving Barrie)
- CIII-TV-4 channel 4 from Owen Sound (June 1988)
- CIII-TV-27 channel 27 from Peterborough (October 1988)
- CFGC-TV channel 11 from Sudbury (December 1992)
- CFGC-TV-2 channel 2 from North Bay (December 1992)
- CIII-TV-13 channel 13 from Timmins (December 1992)
- CIII-TV-12 channel 12 from Sault Ste. Marie (December 1992)
- CIII-TV-55 channel 55 from Fort Erie (early 1993, serving Niagara Falls and the southern Niagara Region; signal also reaches Buffalo, New York)

On August 28, 1996, Global was given CRTC approval to add a new transmitter at Cornwall. Global had proposed to use VHF channel 11 at Cornwall but instead channel 11 was awarded to Hamilton's CHCH-TV in Ottawa that same day. Another option was to operate a Global transmitter on a UHF channel in Cornwall which was never launched.

CIII is not available in Thunder Bay but the market is served by independently owned affiliate CHFD-DT, owned by Dougall Media. CHFD's owners, the Dougall family, were concerned about Global threatening their local television monopoly (Dougall Media controls all of the local network television output for the Thunder Bay region and had previously lobbied the CRTC to cease CHCH-TV's cable transmissions in the mid-1990s) and pressured the CRTC to deny Global's application to build a transmitter there. However, in 2009, Dougall Media switched the affiliation of CHFD from CTV to Global. As a result, Global-branded programming is available in Thunder Bay, just not via CIII's province-wide network of repeaters. Similarly, in Kenora, former CTV affiliate, CJBN-TV (which was owned by Shaw), switched to full-time Global programming in late 2011 (the station would cease operations in January 2017).

Initial attempts to cover Peterborough and Kingston from the Bancroft transmitter had yielded poor to marginal results; this signal has since been largely supplanted (for Peterborough only) by the more-powerful CIII-TV-27. Despite CHEX-DT becoming Global's Peterborough station in 2018, CIII-DT-27 remains on the air.

CIII-TV-41, along with CHCH in Hamilton and CHAN-TV in Vancouver, began over-the-air high-definition broadcasts in 2008.

=== Former transmitter ===
Station	City of licence	Channel (RF / VC)	ERP	HAAT	Transmitter coordinates
CIII-TV-2	Bancroft	2 (VHF)	100 kW	390 m (1,280 ft)	45°3′34″N 77°11′59″W
