= Global Television Network =

Canadian broadcast TV network

- Type: Terrestrial television network
- Country: Canada
- Broadcast area: Canada parts of the United States via cable or antenna, depending on location
- Affiliates: See § Global stations
- Headquarters: Corus Quay, Toronto, Ontario, Canada

Programming
- Picture format: 1080i HDTV

Ownership
- Owner: Corus Entertainment
- Key people: Jennifer Abrams (senior vice president, programming and platform, Corus Entertainment)
- Sister channels: Home Network; Flavour Network; W Network; Slice; National Geographic; Nat Geo Wild; History; Showcase; DTour; Global Reality Channel

History
- Launched: January 6, 1974; 52 years ago (original system in Ontario); August 18, 1997; 29 years ago (national network)
- Founder: Al Bruner; Peter Hill
- Former names: CanWest Global System (used in the 1990s on non-Global branded Canwest stations)

Links
- Website: www.globaltv.com

The Global Television Network (more commonly called Global, or occasionally Global TV) is a Canadian English-language terrestrial television network. It is currently Canada's second most-watched private terrestrial television network after CTV, and has fifteen owned-and-operated stations throughout the country. Global is owned by Corus Entertainment — the media holdings of JR Shaw and other members of his family.

Global has its origins in a regional television station of the same name, serving Southern Ontario, which launched in 1974. The Ontario station was soon purchased by the now-defunct CanWest Global Communications, and that company gradually expanded its national reach in the subsequent decades through both acquisitions and new station launches, building up a quasi-network of independent stations, known as the CanWest Global System, until the stations were unified under the Ontario station's branding in 1997.

== History ==
=== NTV ===
The network has its origins in NTV, a new network first proposed in 1966 by Hamilton media proprietor Ken Soble, the co-founder and owner of independent station CHCH-TV through his Niagara Television company. Financially backed by Power Corporation of Canada, Soble submitted a brief to the Board of Broadcast Governors in 1966 proposing a national satellite-fed network. Under the plan, Soble's company would launch Canada's first broadcast satellite and would use it to relay the programming of CHCH to 96 new transmitters across Canada. Soble died in December of that year; his widow, Frances, took over as president of Niagara Television, while former CTV executive Michael Hind-Smith and Niagara Television vice-president Al Bruner handled the network application. Soble had originally formulated the plan after failing in a bid to acquire CTV.

The original proposal was widely criticized on various grounds, including claims that it exceeded the board's concentration of media ownership limits and that it was overly ambitious and financially unsustainable. As well, it failed to include any plan for local news content on any of its individual stations beyond possibly the metropolitan Toronto, Montreal, and Vancouver markets.

By 1968, NTV put forward its first official licence application, under which the original 96 transmitters would be supplemented by 43 more transmitters to distribute a separate French-language service, along with provisions for the free distribution of CBC Television, Radio-Canada, and a new noncommercial educational television service on the network's satellite. Transponder space would also be leased to CTV and Télé-Métropole, but as competing commercial services, they would not have been granted the free distribution rights the plan offered to the public television services. However, after federal communications minister Paul Hellyer announced plans to move forward with the publicly owned Anik series of broadcast satellites through Telesat Canada instead of leaving the rollout of satellite technology in the hands of private corporations, Power Corporation backed out of the application and left NTV in limbo.

=== Global Communications ===
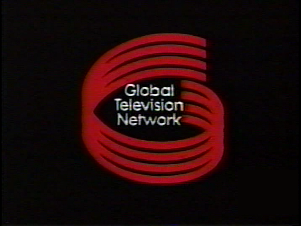
The original logo (1974–1997) of Global featured a stylized "G".

Bruner was fired from Niagara Television in 1969, purportedly because his efforts to rescue the network application were leading him to neglect his other duties with the company's existing media operations. He then put together another investment team to form Global Communications, which carried the network application forward thereafter. By 1970, the Canadian Radio and Television Commission had put out a formal call for "third" stations in several major cities. Global Communications put forward a revised application under which the network would launch with transmitters only in Ontario, as an interim step toward the eventual buildout of the entire network originally envisioned by Soble. Because Niagara Television and CHCH were no longer involved in the proposal, the 1970 application also requested a licence to launch a new station in Toronto as the chain's flagship.

The network licence was approved by the CRTC on July 21, 1972. The group was granted a six-transmitter network in Southern Ontario, stretching from Windsor to Ottawa. They had also sought a seventh transmitter in Maxville that would have nominally served Cornwall but could reach Montreal, but were turned down because of a CRTC moratorium on new English stations in the Montreal market. The transmitters would all be fed from a central studio in Toronto. The group promised a high level of Canadian content and agreed not to accept local advertising.

The station's initial plan was to broadcast only during prime time hours from 5 p.m. to midnight, while leasing daytime hours to the Ontario Educational Communications Authority to broadcast educational programming. However, the offer never came to fruition, with the OECA opting instead to expand TVOntario by launching its own transmitters.

The new Global Television Network, with the callsign CKGN-TV (now CIII-DT), launched on January 6, 1974, from studios located at a former factory in the Don Mills neighbourhood in North York (now in Toronto) at 6 p.m. local time. Global remains based there today. Although the Ontario station has always been based in Toronto, its main transmitter was licensed to Paris; halfway between Kitchener-Waterloo and Hamilton, transmitting on Channel 6, until 2009. Repeating transmitters were originally located near Windsor on Channel 22; Sarnia, Channel 29, Uxbridge on Channel 22, to serve the metro Toronto area; Bancroft, on Channel 2; and Hull, Quebec, to cover the Ottawa area, on Channel 6.

=== Launch ===
Global's original prime time schedule included Patrick Watson's documentary series Witness to Yesterday, Pierre Berton's political debate show The Great Debate, a Canadian edition of Bernard Braden's British consumer affairs newsmagazine The Braden Beat, William Shatner's film talk show Flick Flack, Sunday night Toronto Toros hockey games and a nightly variety series called Everything Goes, as well as a few imported American series, including Chopper One, Dirty Sally, and Doc Elliot. In March, the station drew a formal complaint from MP James McGrath against its airing of the 1969 Western film Heaven with a Gun, as the film featured scenes of violence that McGrath considered inappropriate.

The station ran into a financial crisis within just three months. Due to the CRTC decision, it was forced to launch at midseason. Many companies had already allocated their advertising budgets for the season and had little money left to buy time on the newly minted network, and even some of the advertisers who had booked time on the network backed out in light of the 1973 oil crisis. In addition, the short-lived American adoption of year-round daylight saving time in January 1974 and the Ontario government's refusal to follow suit had unexpectedly forced Everything Goes, promoted as the network's flagship show, into airing directly opposite The Tonight Show Starring Johnny Carson and thus attracting disastrous ratings. As a result of the crisis, the station quickly lost access to its line of credit.

Unable to meet daily expenses, Global initially approached potential bidders, including Channel Seventynine, Denison Mines, Standard Broadcasting, and the Jim Pattison Group, and was soon bailed out by IWC Communications, owned by broadcaster Allan Slaight, and Global Ventures Western Ltd., a syndicate that included Winnipeg movie theatre owner Paul Morton and Izzy Asper, a Manitoba politician turned broadcaster. Asper's company, CanWest Capital, was in the process of obtaining the licence for what would become CKND-TV in Winnipeg, which planned to carry some of Global's programs under a syndication deal.

=== 1970s–1990s ===
In the spring of 1974, Global cancelled a significant number of its scheduled programs. By that fall, it was obvious that Global's original model was unsustainable, and it was forced to pick up a large amount of American programming to fill in the gaps. With American imports filling as much of the schedule as Canadian content rules would allow (60% Canadian overall, 50% Canadian in prime time), Global had effectively become "another CTV." With the exception of the nightly newscasts, few other Canadian-produced programs remained on the station, and the ones that did exist were largely criticized as cheaply produced filler. John Spalding, the station's original program director, quit in 1975 after being unable to convince the station's owners to invest more money into higher-quality production. To replace him, the company recruited programmer Bill Stewart away from CKCO-TV, Kitchener. Stewart's savvy program purchases in the ensuing years were largely credited with keeping the network viable while its viewership grew. The company enhanced its senior talent pool in 1979 with the arrival of sales guru Dave Mintz, formerly of KVOS-TV, as the network's president, a post he held until his retirement in 1993, taking Global from the lowest-rated station in Toronto to the ratings leader along the way. Over several years, the prime late evening newscast shifted between 10 and 11 p.m. and between 30 and 60 minutes. CKGN changed its callsign to CIII-TV in 1984, deferring to its widespread CATV distribution on Cable 3.

Asper bought a controlling interest in 1985, making him the first western-based owner of a major Canadian broadcaster. In 1989, Asper and Morton tried to buy each other out, a struggle that was resolved in favour of Asper and Canwest.

For its first decade, the network remained restricted to its six-transmitter chain in Ontario. However, soon after Asper bought controlling interest in Global, he seemed eager to grow his chain of stations into a third national network. He started by launching CFRE-DT in Regina and CFSK-DT in Saskatoon, and winning a legal battle for CKVU-DT in Vancouver during the second half of the 1980s. He also acquired the fledgling CIHF-DT in Halifax in the early 1990s. Canwest's stations now reached seven of Canada's ten provinces. The Canwest stations purchased many of their programs collectively, and consequently had similar—although not identical—broadcast schedules. They did not share common branding, however—although stations were sometimes indicated as being part of the "CanWest Global System" as a secondary brand, throughout the 1980s and early 1990s they each retained their own branding and continued to function as an ownership group of independent stations rather than as a fully unified network.

The second logo (1997–2006) of Global, which debuted with its formal rebranding as a national network. The crescent motif was also used on the logos of other Canwest properties such as CH, Prime, and Mystery TV, and is still featured on DejaView's logo.

In 1997, Canwest bought a controlling interest in the CBC affiliate in Quebec City, CKMI-TV, from TVA. It was an open secret that Global was using CKMI as a vehicle to fulfill its quarter-century quest to get a station in Montreal, by some distance the largest market where it had no presence at all.

With the acquisition of CKMI (though TVA retained a minority interest until 2002), Canwest now had enough coverage of Canada that it seemed logical to rebrand its station group as a network. Accordingly, on August 18, 1997, Canwest scrubbed all local branding from its stations and rebranded them as the "Global Television Network," the brand previously used solely by the Ontario outlet. A month later, CKMI disaffiliated from CBC, set up rebroadcasters in Montreal and Sherbrooke, and became the Quebec outlet of the newly minted network. It also built a new studio in Montreal and moved most of its operations there, though the licence nominally remained in Quebec City until 2009. Canwest's acquisition of CKMI expanded Global's reach to eight of Canada's 10 largest markets, with only rebroadcasters serving Ottawa and Montreal.

Even so, Global was still not a fully national network, as it did not have stations in Calgary and Edmonton. The CRTC turned down bids by Canwest for stations in those cities in the 1980s. As a result, Global continued its long-standing secondary affiliations in those cities on independent stations CICT-TV and CITV-TV, respectively. Similarly, Global lacked a full-time station in St. John's, where Global programming was carried by longtime CTV affiliate CJON-TV.

=== 2000s ===
In 2000, Canwest acquired the conventional television assets of Western International Communications (WIC). WIC's stations in Calgary, Edmonton, and Lethbridge had been airing some Global programs since 1988, and those stations formally joined the network on September 4, 2000.

The following fall, WIC's long-dominant Vancouver station CHAN-TV was brought into the fold after its existing affiliation agreement with CTV expired, setting off a sweeping realignment of television affiliations in southwestern British Columbia. Indeed, one main reason why Canwest bought WIC's television assets was because of CHAN's enormous translator network, which covered 97% of British Columbia. Global's previous Vancouver station, CKVU-TV, as well as WIC-owned Montreal CTV affiliate CFCF-TV, were sold off. WIC's remaining stations were maintained as twinstick stations and were eventually integrated into a secondary system known as CH (rebranded as E! in 2007 in a partnership with the American channel of the same name), although financial pressures forced Canwest to sell or fold the E! stations in 2009.

Full network service is still not available over-the-air in Newfoundland and Labrador. However, CJON, having disaffiliated from CTV in 2002, now clears the vast majority of Global programming in that province, most recently adding the network's national newscast in mid-2009. Any remaining programs there may be accessed on cable or satellite through Global stations from other markets (most commonly Edmonton's CITV) or through the network's website.

Following Canwest's purchase of Southam Newspapers (later Canwest Publishing) and the National Post from Conrad Black in 2001, their media interests were merged under a policy of cross-promotion and synergy. Journalists from the Post and other Canwest papers made frequent appearances on Global's news programs, passengers on the now-defunct serial drama Train 48 habitually read the Post, and Global programs were promoted in Canwest newspapers. However, this practice has now been largely abandoned, particularly after Canwest's breakup in 2010.

In late 2004, with CTV beginning to dominate the ratings, Canwest reorganized its Canadian operations and hired a number of new executives, all formerly of various U.S. media firms, leading to a major overhaul of Global that was announced in December 2005. The most obvious change was a new logo, replacing the "crescent" with a new "greater than" logo, with the Global wordmark in a new font, that was introduced on February 5, 2006 (coinciding with Global's broadcast of Super Bowl XL). New logos and graphics were designed for news and network promotions, and several newscasts received new timeslots and formats. The company subsequently removed the crescent, which had been a common design element in many Canwest logos, from other properties it owned or sponsored over time.

On April 10, 2008, the network announced that its Toronto and Vancouver stations would start broadcasting their over-the-air signals in those markets in high definition. CIII and CHAN officially started transmitting in HD on April 18, 2008. The network has also launched digital signals at its stations in Calgary (CICT-DT) and Edmonton (CITV-DT) as of July 2009.

=== 2010s ===
Following Canwest seeking creditor protection in late 2009, Shaw Communications acquired Canwest's broadcasting assets on October 27, 2010, and folded them into a new division, Shaw Media, of which Global is the flagship. Canwest's newspaper assets had been sold off earlier in the year as Postmedia Network.

On April 1, 2016, Shaw Media was sold to Corus Entertainment, a sister company to Shaw Communications. In approving the transaction, the CRTC noted that Corus and Shaw shared a common de facto owner in Shaw founder JR Shaw, and treated the two companies as "a single voice" under the CRTC's rules on diversity of ownership. For this reason, while the deal was marketed as an acquisition, the CRTC treated it as a corporate reorganization for regulatory purposes.

== Television listings ==
In television listings such as TV Guide, where space limitations usually require television networks to be referred to by a three-letter abbreviation, the abbreviations "GLO," "GLB," or "GTV" are commonly used, depending on the publication. None of these abbreviations has any standing as an official name for the network, however—the network's own short form name for itself is always "Global."

== Programming ==
=== News ===
Global News is the news and current affairs division of the Global Television Network, which is based in Vancouver. National programs broadcast by the division include Global's flagship national newscast Global National and newsmagazine shows such as 16x9. The network also offers various amounts of local news programming on its eleven O&Os. Local news programming on most of Global's O&Os mirror the newscast schedules of many U.S. television stations; most Global-owned stations carry a morning newscast of three or four hours in length, a noon newscast, supper hour newscasts of between 30 and 90 minutes and a half-hour to hour-long late evening newscast. Global-owned stations in certain major markets also carry locally based public affairs programs under the Focus brand.

In addition, Corus also operates several Global-branded news/talk radio stations across Canada under the Global News Radio moniker.

=== Entertainment ===
Global does not have what can be called a main schedule, apart from news. Even before the WIC purchase, the Global stations had widely varying program lineups, and the WIC purchase only exacerbated the differences. For example, CHAN held the British Columbia rights to many shows that aired on CTV until 2001, except for The Oprah Winfrey Show. Factors influencing the stations' programming include time zone differences, local programming, and ratings for non-Global shows.

Global has built its business on profitable entertainment programming produced in the United States and has long been criticized for not investing enough in Canadian content. Canadian programming carried on the network, such as a revival of 1960s American science fiction series The Outer Limits, or the Chicago-set drama Zoe Busiek: Wild Card, has often avoided Canadian themes, presumably to focus on sales to United States and international cable or syndication markets – although Psi Factor did include Canadian themes, including a "killer wheat" episode and episodes set in Northern Quebec and Halifax. Series initially intended for the U.S. and international market are sometimes called "industrial" productions and largely disappeared with the collapse of the international action hour market.

From the late-1990s to the mid-2000s, Global aired somewhat more identifiably Canadian entertainment programming, including the long-running finance drama Traders, the British-Canadian animated comedy Bob and Margaret, the police procedural drama Blue Murder, the nightly improvised drama Train 48, the sitcom The Jane Show and the reality show My Fabulous Gay Wedding. In 2003, Global signed comedian Mike Bullard, host of the nightly Open Mike with Mike Bullard on CTV and The Comedy Network, to a multi-year contract for a new nightly talk show on Global, but that series was cancelled after 60 episodes amid poor ratings.

Global purchased the rights to produce a Canadian version of the popular entertainment magazine Entertainment Tonight; ET Canada launched on September 12, 2005. It also secured Canadian production rights to the American reality series The Apprentice, but a Canadian version of the program never came to fruition. They also produce a Canadian version of the reality series Big Brother.

Global, like all Canadian broadcast outlets, benefits from Canada's simultaneous substitution (or "simsub") regulations, which allow content owners to control programming rights for a particular show in Canada. When an American broadcast network is broadcasting the same show at the same time that Global is (such as the programs mentioned above), Canadian cable subscribers may only watch the Global Television broadcast, even when trying to view the American stations. This law gives them double exposure for their content and a larger share of advertising revenue, effectively blocking American border cities from access to the Canadian market. This was done to help give money to the networks to fund Canadian content development. Global is not the only Canadian broadcaster to use simsubs; nonetheless, some complaints, specific to Global, have arisen due to the following related practices:

- Some Global stations have superimposed the phrase "on Global" on a program's main titles, often in a font that poorly replicates that of the title itself. This sometimes meant that a single superimposed version was used with each episode, potentially interfering with running gags within the opening credits. For instance, the opening of American Dad! during the early seasons featured a news headline that changed with each episode, but for a time, the same headline might be shown on multiple episodes on Global, an issue that was later rectified. This practice was discontinued altogether with the start of the fall 2006 season.
- Split-screen credits are also used to allow for network promos (as of the 2009–10 season, the show's own stylized production credits are displayed rather than a network-generated uniform credit sequence). On some shows, including The Simpsons and Family Guy, there are special closing credits that may use additional scenes or special music that is altered or lost when Global uses a split screen. While the use of split-screen credits is common among networks in Canada and the U.S., how Global treats one program and how the U.S. network treats the same episode may be different.
- In some cases, next-episode previews, such as those on The Apprentice, are not shown. This may be because these promos are made in-house by the network (in this case, NBC), and cannot be edited ahead of broadcast.
- Since the late 2000s, several American networks have begun to start certain shows shortly before or after :00 or :30 past the hour to avert audience loss. Global does not necessarily follow this practice, meaning the last few minutes of the preceding show may be lost to those watching the U.S. network. For instance, if NBC schedules The Apprentice to start at 9:02, but Global schedules its start for exactly 9:00, the last two minutes of NBC's 8:00 program may be blocked by the Global signal. This is not unique to Global and may vary by service provider, since cable and satellite providers, not the networks, are responsible for scheduling and initiating simsubs.
- If an American program on a U.S. network is delayed due to breaking news or a sporting event on the American network and is scheduled for broadcast at that time on Global, Global will also delay that episode until it starts on the American network to intentionally simsub. One example is an episode of House that aired after Super Bowl XLII in 2008 (see below).
- Global was the Canadian broadcast-television rightsholder for the National Football League and, hence, the Super Bowl, through the end of the 2006 season (these rights were bought by CTV starting with the 2007 season). As with any other U.S. network program, Global could and did simsub the American feed. However, the Super Bowl is particularly controversial, as the U.S. network Super Bowl commercials, likely the most anticipated set of commercials of any given year, could not be seen on either Global or the applicable U.S. station. Instead, while some international advertisers (such as Budweiser) did buy time on Global for the U.S. ads, many Canadian companies simply ran ads introduced long before the game. Nonetheless, in recent years, nearly all American commercials have been available via various websites after the game, which may have placated some complainants.

Global cross-promotes heavily with other Corus Entertainment properties in the markets where both services operate in parallel.

On June 6, 2007, the Canadian actors' union ACTRA picketed Global's fall upfronts presentation to protest the lack of Canadian content on current television network schedules.

=== Sports ===
In 1979, Global – then a regional network in Ontario – purchased the Toronto Blizzard soccer team and produced and aired coverage of the team's games in-house. The team was not a success on the field, in attendance or ratings, and Global sold the franchise in 1981 but continued to broadcast seven games a year until 1983.

Aside from its brief experiment with soccer, the Global network has never had an in-house sports production division as do CBC, CTV/TSN, & Citytv/Sportsnet. Network sports broadcasts are either simulcast with American networks or outsourced to independent producers such as Molstar. During the 1987 and 1988 Stanley Cup playoffs, Global aired NHL games syndicated by Carling O'Keefe. Global was the longtime broadcaster of National Football League football games in Canada, an association that ended in 2007 when CTV outbid Global for the NFL broadcast package. The network was a long-time broadcaster of PGA Tour events.

Beyond event coverage, many Global stations were well known for local late-night sports highlights shows, such as Sportsline in Ontario, Sports Page in Vancouver (later moved to former sister station CHEK-TV), 2&7 Sports at 11 in Calgary and Sports Night in Edmonton. Most of these programs were later unified under the Global Sports brand. However, due to declining audiences, by fall 2005 all but the Ontario program had been cancelled, although stations continued to cover sports in their local newscasts. Global Ontario's sports program was finally cancelled in January 2007; at that point, the station closed its sports department entirely, and for a time outsourced sports coverage to Sportsnet and The Score / Sportsnet 360.

Some Global O&Os outside of Ontario (such as CHAN Vancouver and CITV Edmonton) continue to feature locally produced sports segments on their local newscasts. On the other hand, the sports segments aired during local newscasts on CIHF-DT in Saint John and CKMI-DT in Montreal are produced from CHAN's Vancouver studio, presented by that station's sports anchors.

Until the discontinuation of Fox Sports World Canada, CKND-DT in Winnipeg also produced the Fox Soccer Report, which was seen on the network and Fox Soccer in the United States. It was replaced in 2012 by the Sportsnet-produced Fox Soccer News.

In 2015, Global broadcast coverage of the Canada West conference's university football championship, including coverage of one semi-final game, and the Hardy Cup game the following week. The telecasts were produced through Shaw TV's Canada West Football on Shaw package.

=== Video on-demand ===
Global streams live and on-demand programming via its website and apps for mobile devices and digital media players. In 2020, the Global apps were relaunched to include streaming for subscribers of most of Corus Entertainment's specialty channels, mirroring a similar move announced by CTV. In 2026, it was announced that the Global app would be renamed to the StackTV app later that year, aligning with the StackTV video subscription service.

== Global HD ==
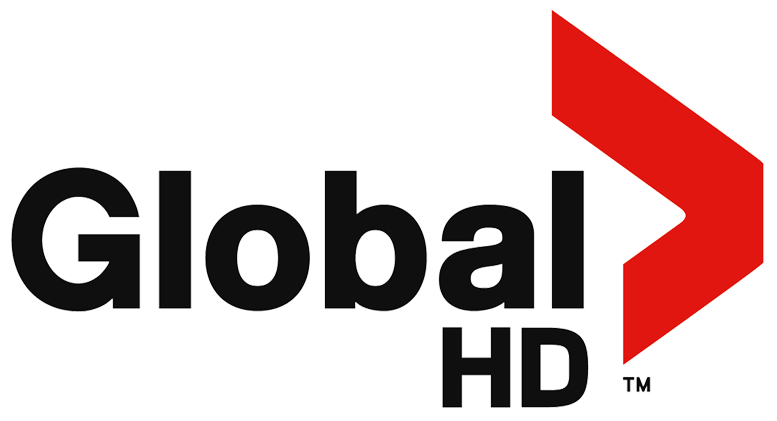

In October 2004, Global launched a 1080i high definition simulcast feed of its Toronto station CIII-TV called Global HD and started airing select American programs in HD; some Canadian series such as Falcon Beach eventually began to be included among its HD programs. At the time, the service was only available via digital cable. On April 18, 2008, Global officially launched a digital transmitter in Toronto, making the HD simulcast of CIII-TV available over-the-air. The network also launched an HD simulcast feed of its Vancouver station (CHAN-TV) on the same day.

Global HD is available nationally via satellite and on digital cable as well as for free over-the-air using a regular TV antenna and a digital tuner (included in most new television sets) on the following channels:

City	Station	OTA digital channel (virtual channel)
Calgary, Alberta	CICT-DT	41 (2.1)
Charlottetown, Prince Edward Island	CHNB-DT-14	42 (42.1)
Edmonton, Alberta	CITV-DT	13 (13.1)
Fredericton, New Brunswick	CHNB-DT-1	44 (11.1)
Halifax, Nova Scotia	CIHF-DT	8 (8.1)
Kamloops, British Columbia	CHKM-DT	22 (6.1)
Kelowna, British Columbia	CHBC-DT	27 (2.1)
Kelowna, British Columbia	CHKL-DT	24 (5.1)
Lethbridge, Alberta	CISA-DT	7 (7.1)
Midland, Ontario	CIII-DT-7	7 (7.1)
Montreal, Quebec	CKMI-DT-1	15 (15.1)
Moncton, New Brunswick	CHNB-DT-3	27 (27.1)
Ottawa, Ontario	CIII-DT-6	6 (6.1)
Paris, Ontario	CIII-DT	17 (6.1)
Penticton, British Columbia	CHBC-DT-1	32 (13.1)
Penticton, British Columbia	CHKL-DT-1	30 (10.1)
Prince George, British Columbia	CIFG-DT	29 (12.1)
Quebec City, Quebec	CKMI-DT	20 (20.1)
Regina, Saskatchewan	CFRE-DT	11 (11.1)
Saint John, New Brunswick	CHNB-DT	12 (12.1)
Saskatoon, Saskatchewan	CFSK-DT	42 (4.1)
Sherbrooke, Quebec	CKMI-DT-2	10 (15.1)
Thunder Bay, Ontario	CHFD-DT	4 (4.1)
Toronto, Ontario	CIII-DT-41	41 (41.1)
Vancouver, British Columbia	CHAN-DT	22 (8.1)
Vernon, British Columbia	CHBC-DT-2	20 (7.1)
Vernon, British Columbia	CHKL-DT-2	22 (12.1)
Windsor, Ontario	CIII-DT-22	22 (22.1)
Winnipeg, Manitoba	CKND-DT	19 (9.1)

The above noted transmitters were converted to digital by August 31, 2011, as part of Canada's over-the-air transition deadline in mandatory markets from analog to digital. As part of its purchase by Shaw Communications in 2011, Shaw committed to converting all of the network's over-the-air analog transmitters to digital by 2016.

== Global stations ==
The Global network has long been much more decentralized than either CBC or CTV. For most programs, there is no "network" feed per se, and in effect every commercial break is a station break. National advertising is certainly available, but such ads are seamlessly integrated into local ad blocks.

In fact, it is not uncommon to see different lengths of commercial breaks from one station to the next even during identical programming. This occurs even though all Global stations have had their master control operations centralized in Calgary since fall 2006.

From 2010 to 2016, with the exception of CIII-DT in Toronto, stations used sustained on-screen bugs using each station's full local brand as opposed to simply "Global". In September 2016, except for local newscasts, Global has updated its bug back to "Global" without an additional local station city below it.

=== Owned-and-operated stations ===
Notes:

1) Two boldface asterisks appearing following a station's call letters (**) indicate a flagship station of the Global Television Network;
2) Two boldface plus signs appearing following a station's call letters (++) indicate a station that was part of the Canwest Global System until it was merged with the Global Television Network brand in 1997;

City of licence	Station	Channel TV (RF)	Year of affiliation	Owned since	Notes
Calgary, Alberta	**CICT-DT**	2.1 (41)	1988 (as a secondary affiliate)	2000	Master control hub for all owned-and-operated stations until August 29, 2022
Edmonton, Alberta	**CITV-DT**	13.1 (13)	1988 (as a secondary affiliate)	2000	
Halifax, Nova Scotia	**CIHF-DT**	8.1 (8)	1988	1994	
Kelowna, British Columbia	**CHBC-DT**	2.1 (27)	2009	2000	
Kingston, Ontario	**CKWS-DT**	11.1 (11)	2016 (for news programming only; became full-time O&O in 2018)	2016	
Lethbridge, Alberta	**CISA-DT**	7.1 (7)	1988 (as a secondary affiliate)	2000	
Montreal, Quebec	**CKMI-DT**++	20.1 (20)	1997 (previously secondary 1982–1992)	1997	
Oshawa, Ontario	**CHEX-DT-2**	22.1 (29)	2016 (for news programming only; became full-time O&O in 2018)	2016	
Peterborough, Ontario	**CHEX-DT**	12.1 (12)	2016 (for news programming only; became full-time O&O in 2018)	2016	
Regina, Saskatchewan	**CFRE-DT**++	11.1 (11)	1990	1987	
Saint John, New Brunswick	**CHNB-DT**	12.1 (12)	1988	1994	
Saskatoon, Saskatchewan	**CFSK-DT**++	4.1 (42)	1990	1987	
Toronto, Ontario	**CIII-DT****	6.1 (6)	1974	1974	Master control hub for all owned-and-operated stations since August 29, 2022
Vancouver, British Columbia	**CHAN-DT****	8.1 (22)	2001	2000	Studio facilities based in Burnaby, British Columbia
Winnipeg, Manitoba	**CKND-DT**++	9.1 (40)	1975	1985	

Several O&Os predate the first appearance of the Global banner in 1974. Specifically, CKMI, CICT, CHBC, CHEX, CISA and CKWS launched in the 1950s as CBC Television affiliates, while CHAN-TV launched in 1960 and soon became Vancouver's original CTV affiliate. All of these were eventually supplanted by network-owned stations or transmitters.

Most of these stations serve their entire province or region through a network of relay stations as a part of the key station's licence, although some of their transmitters may air separate advertising targeted to their local community.

=== Affiliates and secondary carriers ===
City of licence	Station	Channel TV (RF)	Year of affiliation	Owner	Notes
St. John's, Newfoundland and Labrador	**CJON-DT** (informal secondary affiliation)	21.1 (21)	2002	Stirling Communications International	Nominally an independent station known as "NTV", CJON is sometimes considered a Global affiliate, as Global has been that station's primary source of programming since dropping its primary CTV affiliation in 2002. However, NTV does not always carry the full Global lineup, and continues to air some CTV specials, as well as national newscasts from both networks.
Thunder Bay, Ontario	**CHFD-DT**	4.1 (4)	2010	Dougall Media	Uses on-air brand "Global Thunder Bay", despite not being an O&O. Previously a CTV affiliate.

=== Former stations ===
==== Owned-and-operated ====
City of licence	Station	Year of affiliation	Year of disaffiliation	Notes
Vancouver, British Columbia	**CKVU-DT**	1997	2001	Had to be divested to own CHAN-TV in Vancouver and CHEK-TV in Victoria, sold to CHUM Limited. Currently owned by Rogers Sports & Media as a Citytv O&O.
Kenora, Ontario	**CJBN-TV**	2011	2017	Shaw Communications elected not to renew the station's licence. The station closed on January 27, 2017.
Lloydminster, Alberta	**CKSA-DT**	2016	2021	Affiliated with CBC Television until 2016, then with Global until 2021; closed on May 13, 2025 due to financial difficulty.

==== Secondary affiliates ====
City of licence	Station	Year of affiliation	Year of disaffiliation	Current affiliation	Notes
Burlington, Vermont/Plattsburgh (city), New York	WVNY	1987	1990	ABC	Provided coverage of Montreal for the Canadian Football Network, as the Global system did not have any affiliates in Quebec at the time.

=== Other Global-branded channels ===
Global previously maintained a secondary television system similar to CTV 2. CH was originally launched on February 12, 2001, by Canwest Global Communications after acquiring the Western International Communications properties in 2000. The system was launched in September of that year when the large network shuffle in Vancouver occurred, only to provide a secondary schedule parallel to Canwest's larger Global Television Network. It initially focused on airing programs from the U.S. broadcast networks that could not fit on Global's own schedule, to avail of simultaneous substitution opportunities. The system became "E!" in fall 2007, as a result of a deal with Comcast to carry programming from that company's U.S.-based E!: Entertainment Television, although it continued to air much the same American network series in primetime and the afternoon.

The E! television system ceased operations on September 1, 2009, due to low ratings and corporate financial difficulties that eventually led to Canwest filing for bankruptcy protection and selling its properties to Shaw Media; the E! O&O stations experienced varied fates (CHCH Hamilton and CJNT Montreal were sold to Channel Zero, CHEK Victoria was sold to an employee-led group; CHBC Kelowna remained with Canwest and was converted into a Global O&O, and CHCA Red Deer ceased operations outright), while the Pattison Group stations affiliated with the Rogers Media-owned Citytv system. As E!, local news and other regional programming, as well as most local community sponsorships on the O&O stations, used local branding (using the callsign branding scheme common with Canadian stations not owned by a network or television system). This decision was at least partly made to avoid confusion with E! News, but likely intended to ensure that local newscasts were not perceived as celebrity-oriented. E! in the U.S. later reached an agreement to bring the channel's brand and programming to Bell Media's Category 2 specialty channel Star! (which had a similar format to E! U.S. and had carried some of its programming prior to the 2007 rebranding of CH), rebranding it as a Canadian version of E! on November 29, 2010.

Other Global-branded channels included the Global Reality Channel that was devoted to reality shows launched in 2010 and ceased operations in 2012, Prime, DejaView and Mystery TV, which the latter three channels formerly wore the previous Global logo.

== See also ==
- List of Global Television Network personalities
- 2007 Canada broadcast TV realignment
- CBS
- CITV
