= Global News Hour =

Canadian TV program

- Also known as: Evening News; News at 5 News Hour Weekends (on weekends); Global News at 5:30 and 6 (Montreal/Toronto); CH News at 5:30 (Hamilton/Red Deer/Victoria)
- Starring: Various hosts
- Opening theme: "News Hour Theme"
- Country of origin: Canada
- Original language: English

Production
- Production locations: Vancouver (Burnaby); Kelowna; Lethbridge; Calgary; Edmonton; Regina; Saskatoon; Winnipeg; Toronto; Oshawa; Peterborough; Kingston; Montreal; The Maritimes
- Running time: 30-60 minutes
- Production company: Global

Original release
- Network: Global; CH/E! (2001-2009)
- Release: 1968 – present

Related
- Morning News; Global News at Noon; Global National; Global News at 11

Global News Hour at 6 (also known as Global News at 6 and Global News at 5:30) is the name of local newscasts that air on Global, each city has a different edition of the program. The show debuted in 1968, originating at CHAN-TV Vancouver (then a CTV affiliate). Global News Hour at 6 airs on CHAN-DT Vancouver, CICT-DT Calgary, and CITV-DT Edmonton. CHBC-DT Kelowna's flagship newscast is the hour-long Global News at 5. CIII-DT Toronto and CKMI-DT Montreal both air newscasts known as Global News at 5:30 (one hour long in Toronto and half an hour in Montreal, which is followed by another half-hour newscast at 6:30). CFRE-DT Regina, CFSK-DT Saskatoon, CKND-DT Winnipeg, CISA-DT Lethbridge, CHNB-DT Saint John, and CIHF-DT Halifax all air half-hour newscasts known as Global News at 6. CHAN, CITV, and CICT, CFRE, and CFSK also air a 5PM newscast known as Global News at 5 (previously Early News), which airs before Global National.

== Global BC ==
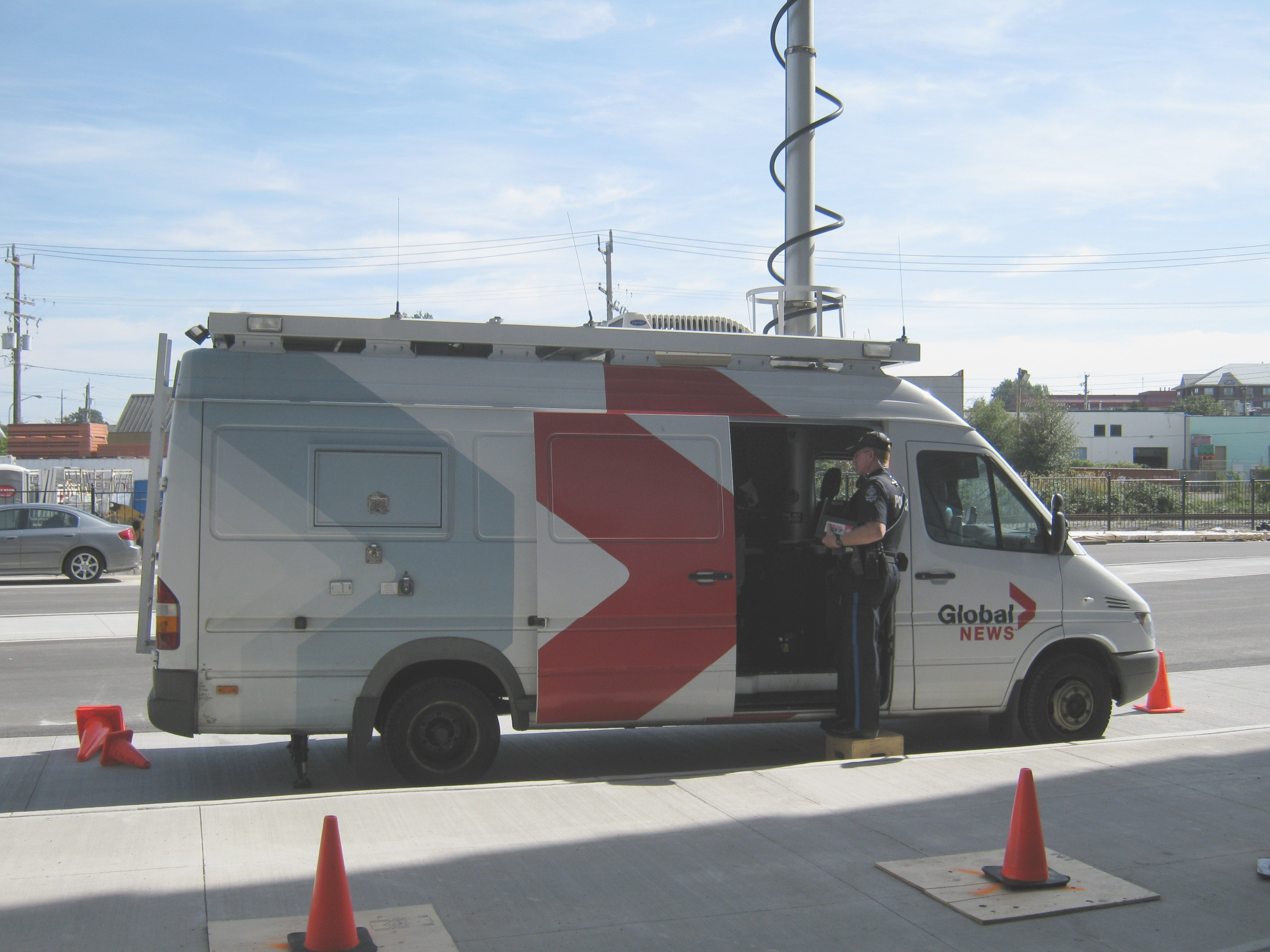
A Global BC News van

Global News Hour at 6 on CHAN-DT airs at 6 pm every weeknight. Global News Hour at 6 is co-hosted by Chris Gailus and Sophie Lui with Kristi Gordon as meteorologist and Squire Barnes as sports host. Global News at 5 is anchored by Sophie Lui with Kristi Gordon as meteorologist and Squire Barnes as sports anchor.

=== Notable former personalities ===
- Frank Griffiths, 1963–1994 (deceased)
- Pamela Martin, 1977-2001 (Now Director of Outreach for Premier Christy Clark)
- Jack Webster, 1978–1987 (deceased)
- Harvey Oberfeld, 1979–2006
- Jennifer Mather, 1991–1998 (Now at CTV News Channel) in Toronto
- Mi-Jung Lee, 1992-1998 (Now at CTV Vancouver)
- Bill Good Jr., 1993-2001 (Retired at CKNW AM in August 2014)
- Rena Heer, (2005–2007) (Now at CTV Vancouver)
- Kevin Newman, (2001–2008, 2008–2010 at Ottawa anchoring Global National but retired on August 20, 2010, now at CTV)
- Tara Nelson, (2005-2008, Now at CTV Calgary)
- Tony Parsons - News Hour anchor (1975–2009, formerly anchor CHEK Victoria and CBC Vancouver from 2010 to 2013)

== Global Okanagan / E! Okanagan ==
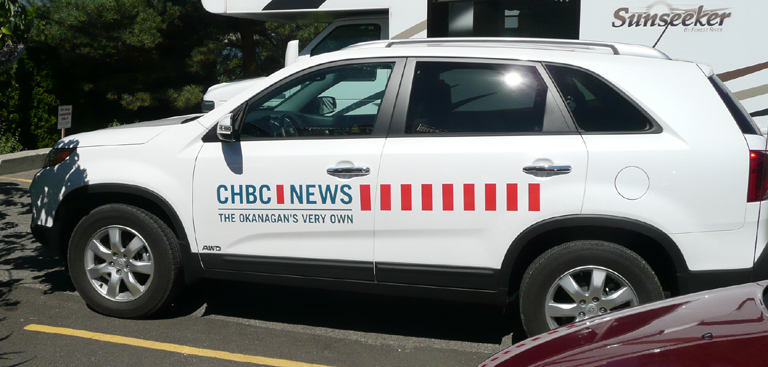
A CHBC News vehicle

CHBC-DT airs an hour-long program known as Global News at 5 (previously CHBC News at 5) as their flagship news program. CHBC also has a half-hour program called Global News at 6:30 which airs after Global National. Global News at 5 is anchored by Kimberly Davidson. Global News at 6:30 is anchored by Doris Maria Bregolisste and Kimberly Davidson. These newscasts were titled CHBC News during its affiliation with CH and later E!.

== Global Edmonton ==
Global Edmonton's logo

Global News Hour at 6 on CITV-DT is anchored by Scott Roberts and Carole-Anne Devaney on weekdays and Jayme Doll on weekends from Calgary. Phil Darlington hosts weather on weekdays and Courtney Stanfield on weekends from Calgary . Global News at 5 is anchored by Carole-Anne Delaney. Roberts also co-anchors Global News at 11 alongside Nicole Di Donato.

=== Notable former personalities ===
- Rob Brown - reporter (1999–2002; now with CBC Calgary)
- Darren Dutchyshen - sports (1987–1995; later with TSN; deceased)
- Carolyn Jarvis - reporter (2005–2009; formerly presenter of 16:9: The Bigger Picture, now chief investigative correspondent for Global National)
- Doug Main - anchor (1975–1988)
- Claire Martin - weather (1996–2005; 2005–2016 with CBC)
- Bill Matheson - weather (1976–1999; deceased)
- Tara Nelson - reporter (now anchor CTV Calgary)
- Kathy Tomlinson - reporter (now with CBC British Columbia)
- Gord Steinke - anchor (retired)

== E! Red Deer ==
After acquiring Western International Communications in 2000, CHCA then known as CKRD, remained a CBC affiliate until 2005 when it was relaunched under the CH brand.

The station aired local newscasts at 5 and 5:30 p.m. and 11 p.m. Monday to Friday as CH News, and aired newscasts on the weekends. The newscasts were rebranded to CHCA News in 2007 with CH relaunched as E!. The weekend newscasts were removed in September 2008 as the changes coincided with Global Edmonton remotely taking control of the station's production. The news set surrounding the on-air talent was digitally created, similar to a weather anchor's green screen set up. The final newscasts were aired on August 29, 2009.

=== Notable former personalities ===
- Jennifer Ivanov
- Suzy Burge (Weather)
- Slav Kornik (Sports)
- Tanara McLean
- Tino Makris
- Nicole Weisberg
- Courtney Ketchen

== Global Calgary ==
Global Calgary's logo

Global News Hour at 6 on CICT-DT is anchored by Dallas Flexhaug and Joel Senick on weekdays and Jayme Doll on weekends. Chief Meteorologist Tiffany Lizée hosts weather on weekdays. Flexhaug also anchors Global News at 5. Senick also co-anchors Global News at 11, alongside Global Edmonton's rotating anchors/reporters.

=== Notable former personalities ===
- Ashleigh Banfield (was with MSNBC, later at TruTV, formerly Court TV; now with NewsNation)
- Ed Whalen - deceased - was with CICT (then known as CHCT-TV) the first day it went on the air. News and Sports Director, news anchor & editorial. Host of Stampede Wrestling. Later, sports anchor and Calgary Flames play-by-play announcer. (Also worked for CFAC Radio and Calgary Sun)

== Global Lethbridge ==
Global News at 5 is CISA's flagship newscast which is anchored by Liam Nixon with Tiffany Lizee on weather from Calgary. Global News at 6 also airs following Global National. CISA previously had a one-hour-long newscast, known as News Hour, from 6-7pm, however it was shortened to half an hour in 2014, with the latter half replaced with a simulcast of Global Calgary's News Hour.

=== Notable former personalities ===
- Holly Horton (now co-host of TSN's SportsCentre)
- Jackson Proskow (now National Bureau Chief with Global National in Washington, D.C.)

== Global Regina ==
Global News at 6 on CFRE-DT is anchored by Carlyle Fiset with CFSK meteorologist Peter Quinlan doing the weather. Global News at 5 and Global News at 10 is anchored by Carlyle Fiset and Elise Darwish.

== Global Saskatoon ==
Global News at 6 on CFSK-DT is produced in Regina and anchored by Carlyle Fiset with local meteorologist Peter Quinlan doing the weather. It was previously produced locally from Saskatoon, however when longtime Global Saskatoon personality Julie Mintenko departed the station, the decision was made to centralize production in Regina. Global News at 5 and Global News at 10 is anchored by Carlyle Fiset and Elise Darwish.

== Global Winnipeg ==
Global News at 6 on CKND-DT is anchored by Lisa Dutton with Mike Koncan on weather on weekdays and Mark Carcasole (from Toronto) with Ross Hull on weather and Anthony Bruno on sports on weekends. Global News at 10 is anchored by Lisa Dutton and Kevin Hirschfield along with Mike Koncan on weather and Russ Hobson on sports on weekdays and Mark Carcasole (from Toronto) with Mike Arsenault on weather and Megan Robinson on sports on weekends.

=== Notable former personalities ===
- Don Marks - news anchor
- Jeremy St. Louis - weather person
- Andrea Slobodian - weather/community anchor (now with Communications and Stakeholder Relations at the Manitoba Legislature)
- Diana Swain - news anchor (currently Feature Reporter with CBC News: The National)
- Peter Chura - news anchor (ran as a Manitoba Liberal in the 2016 Manitoba General Election)
- Dawna Friesen - news anchor (now Global National anchor)

== Global Toronto ==
Global Toronto's logo

Global News at 5:30 on CIII-DT is anchored by Alan Carter and Farah Nasser with Anthony Farnell on weather. Global News at 11 is anchored by Crystal Goomansingh with Mike Arsenault or Ross Hull on weather and Rob Leth on sports. Global News at 6, which is only half an hour long, is anchored by Mark Carcasole with Ross Hull on weather and Anthony Bruno on sports on weekends.

=== Notable personalities ===
- Carolyn MacKenzie - anchor on The Morning Show. Formerly anchor of News Hour Final

==== Notable former personalities ====
- Robin Gill - anchor, 2008–2009; later with Global National
- Anne-Marie Mediwake - anchor, 2006–2007; later with CBC News Network and CBC Toronto, now with CTV News, as the host of Your Morning
- Leslie Roberts - anchor

== E! Hamilton ==
E! Hamilton's logo

After Canwest acquired the assets of Western International Communications in 2000, Canwest relaunched CHCH-DT as "CH Hamilton" and later the CH system in 2001, but was rebranded to E! in 2007. These programs featured such as Live @ 5:30, a debate talk show hosted by Mark Hebscher and Donna Skelly, CHCH News at 6:00 (formerly CH News at 6) with Matt Hayes on weather and CHCH News at 11:00 (formerly CH News Final). The station continues to produce its own newscasts after CHCH was sold to Channel Zero in 2009.

=== Former on-air staff ===
- Nick Dixon - anchor, currently with CP24
- Michelle Dubé – reporter and anchor; now reporter and anchor for CTV Toronto
- Heather Hiscox – anchor and executive producer; now news anchor for CBC News Network
- Dan McLean – senior news anchor (1970–2008); later news anchor at CIXK-FM in Owen Sound, Ontario; retired June 2013

== Global Montreal ==
Global News at 5:30 is anchored by Jamie Orchard with Anthony Farnell on weather from Toronto. Previously a one-hour-long show, Global News at 5:30 was split into two half-hour newscasts in 2018. Global News at 6:30 is also anchored by Jamie Orchard and airs after Global National. Global News at 6 is anchored by Mark Carcasole from Toronto on weekends.

== Global Halifax and New Brunswick ==
Global News at 6 on CIHF-DT is anchored by Sarah Ritchie with Anthony Farnell on weather and Rob Leth on sports on weekdays. Global News at 11 is anchored by Crystal Goomansingh with Anthony Farnell on weather and Rob Leth on sports on weekends.

=== Notable former personalities ===
- Janet Stewart - evening anchor (now working at CBC in Winnipeg)

== Jim Pattison affiliates ==
The three stations owned by the Jim Pattison Group: CFJC-TV Kamloops, CKPG-TV Prince George and CHAT-TV Medicine Hat were former CBC Television affiliates that later joined CH/E! system in 2006 and 2008 respectively as neither never carried the CH News branding throughout its affiliation. They retained the callsigns and newscast formats in 2009 when they joined the Citytv system.

== Media information ==
=== Online media ===
People can watch the News Hour on the online Global video player in Canada.
