= Global News =

News division of Global Television Network

- Type: Department of the Global Television Network
- Industry: Media, news
- Founded: 1994; 32 years ago
- Headquarters: Toronto, Ontario, Canada
- Area served: Canada
- Services: Television broadcasts and online
- Owner: Corus Entertainment
- Parent: Global Television Network
- Website: globalnews.ca

Global News is the news and current affairs division of the Canadian Global Television Network. The network is owned by Corus Entertainment, which oversees all of the network's national news programming as well as local news on its 21 owned-and-operated stations. The same division also operates a news website under the same brand.

Corus also previously operated one all-news radio station and several talk radio stations under the "Global News Radio" brand; most of these stations are still operated by Corus under local branding.

== National programs ==
Although Global stations had always carried local news in various forms, the first tentative steps towards a national presence came in 1994 with the launch of First National with Peter Kent, an early-evening program focusing on national and international news but airing only in central Canada. After acquiring the Western International Communications (WIC) group of stations, Global cancelled First National in February 2001 and briefly aired the similar WIC newscast Canada Tonight in its place.

In September 2001, Global replaced Canada Tonight with a new network newscast, Global National, anchored by Kevin Newman until 2010 and Dawna Friesen since. It aired from the network's new national news centre at CHAN-TV's studio in Burnaby, British Columbia. The program initially aired only on weekdays. In February 2005, it launched a weekend edition anchored by Tara Nelson until 2008 then Robin Gill from 2008 to 2021. Since June 2022, Farah Nasser anchors Global National Friday to Sunday.

Originally airing in different timeslots around the country, Global National moved to a standard 5:30 p.m. (6:30 p.m. Atlantic) start time nationwide in 2006. Since then, Global National has gained ground on longtime number-one CTV National News, overtaking it on several occasions. A Mandarin version of the newscast, titled Global National Mandarin, launched on January 23, 2012, with anchor Carol Wang, and is seen weeknights on Shaw Multicultural Channel in Vancouver and Calgary.

On January 7, 2013, the network extended its Toronto owned-and-operated station's morning program (The Morning Show) by 30 minutes, with this additional half-hour airing across its other owned-and-operated stations; prior to this, Global did not air a national morning show. In addition, the network's owned-and-operated stations in select markets produce their own local morning shows (see below); stations which do not produce a local morning show either air the morning show from a larger market, or run daytime programming repeated from Shaw Media's cable specialty channels, such as Crash Test Mommy and The Mom Show.

Global launched its first investigative newsmagazine series on November 30, 2008. The weekly program, titled 16x9 - The Bigger Picture, features a high-gloss, tabloid format, and is the network's first foray into the field long occupied by CTV's W-FIVE and CBC's the fifth estate. Global also formerly aired a weekly documentary series, Global Currents.

During the 2011 federal election, Global News also produced a weekly series, Focus: Decision Canada, covering news and issues in the election campaign. The show, hosted by weekend Global National anchor Carolyn Jarvis, was a nominee for Best Information Program or Series at the 2011 Gemini Awards.

The West Block, a Sunday morning national political affairs show, debuted on November 6, 2011. Hosted by Tom Clark from 2011 to 2016, its current host is Mercedes Stephenson.

The investigative series 16x9 as well as Global National Mandarin were both cancelled on June 28, 2016.

== Local programs ==
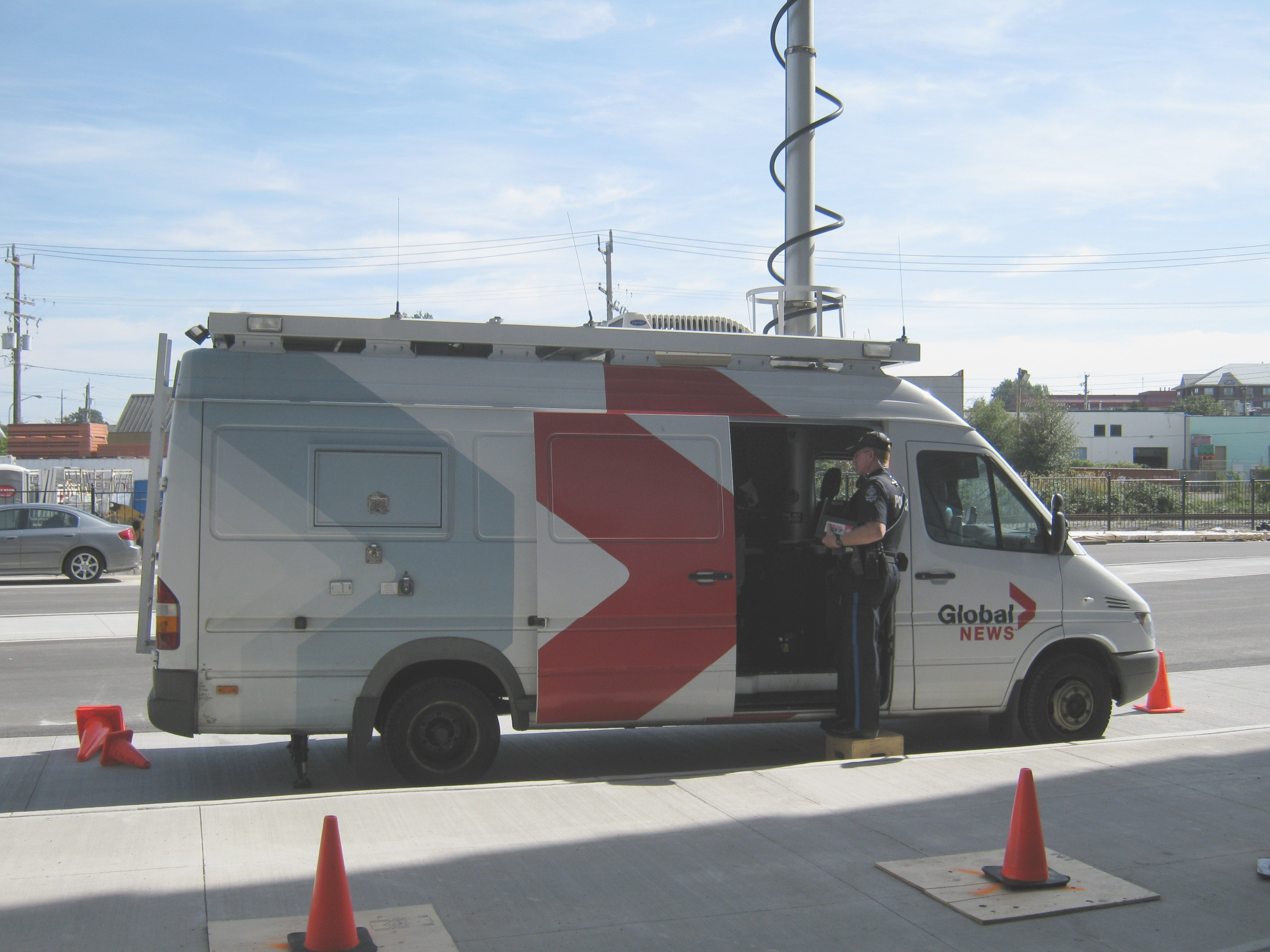
Global BC's live van

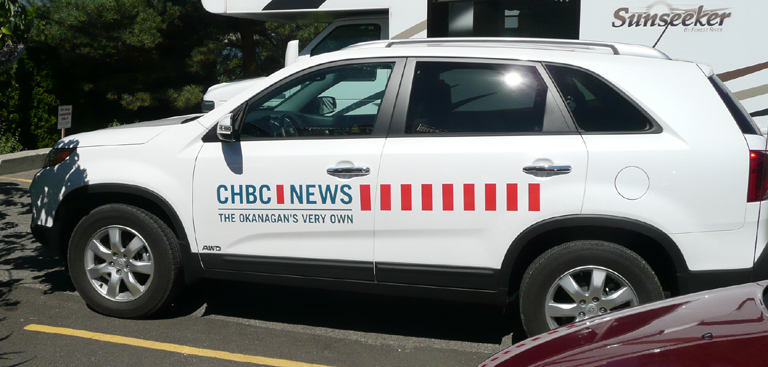
A CHBC News vehicle formerly operated by E!

In the network's original form as an independent station based exclusively in Ontario, the original news anchors were Peter Trueman and Peter Desbarats who launched Global News in 1974.

Until 1997, the name Global News was used only for the local newscasts on Global Ontario, and Canwest's other local television stations all had different newscast titles.

With the nationwide launch of the Global brand in 1997, Global News was also adopted as a standard title for local newscasts on Global owned-and-operated stations. The long-dominant CHAN-TV Vancouver (BCTV) had been an exception; its news operation was renamed BCTV News on Global when it became a Global owned-and-operated in 2001, and its individual newscast titles (e.g. News Hour) were also retained, until the full network rebrand in February 2006.

Upon the acquisition of the assets of Western International Communications in 2000 by Global's then-parent company Canwest, it launched the CH television system in 2001, which consisted of CHEK-TV Victoria, CHCH-TV Hamilton and CJNT-TV Montreal as well as CHCA-TV Red Deer. Its newscasts were titled CH News.

As part of a network-wide branding overhaul, local newscast titles and timeslots were standardized effective February 6, 2006, following the BCTV model. The exact lineup of newscasts and titles varied by station. The only station that did not follow the BCTV model is CHBC-TV Kelowna, which has kept its call sign as part of its news branding. However on September 7, 2007, when CH was rebranded to E!: Entertainment Television, CH News became CHCH News in Hamilton and other local E! stations across the country followed suit to avoid confusion with E! News, but likely intended to ensure that local newscasts were not perceived as celebrity-oriented, though the E! system folded in 2009. As of 2011, CHBC-TV Kelowna have rebranded their news operations as Global News Okanagan. In April 2016, Global once again rebranded its news programs national-wide dropping the BCTV model.

- Global News Morning: weekdays 5–9 am and weekends 7–10 am (BC, Calgary, Edmonton); weekdays 6–10 am (Halifax); weekdays 6–9 am (all other stations); (previously known as Morning News)
- Global News at Noon: weekdays and weekends at noon (previously known as Noon News Hour)
- Global News at 5: weekdays at 5:00 pm (Toronto, BC, Okanagan, Calgary, Edmonton, Lethbridge, Saskatchewan; previously known as Early News)
- Global News at 5:30: weekdays at 5:30 pm (Toronto and Montreal)
- Global News Hour at 6: nightly at 6:00 pm (BC, Calgary, and Edmonton, previously known as News Hour)
- Global News at 6: nightly at 6:00 pm for 30 minutes (Lethbridge, Saskatoon, Regina, Winnipeg, Toronto, Halifax, New Brunswick; previously known as Evening News)
- Global News at 6:30: weeknights at 6:30 pm (Okanagan and Montreal)
- Global News at 10 or Global News at 11: nightly at 10:00 pm (Winnipeg, Regina, and Saskatoon) or 11:00 pm (previously known as News Hour Final or News Final)
- Focus: Weekends (Regina/Saskatoon, Winnipeg, Toronto, Montreal, BC1)

On October 4, 2007, Canwest announced it would be centralizing news production control room functions for all owned-and-operated stations (except CHBC-TV Kelowna) at four broadcast centres – CHAN-DT Vancouver, CITV-TV Edmonton, CICT-TV Calgary, and CIII-TV Toronto. The company stated this would allow all of its stations to make a transition to high definition broadcasting, and create around 50 new jobs at the four stations. Approximately 250 positions were to be eliminated in the other stations, the majority of which were behind-the-scenes/technical positions.

A press release from the company has also stated that on-air talent (including weather anchors), reporters, producers, photographers, editors, and other news gathering positions will remain at the affected stations. Global Edmonton took over production of Global Maritimes' newscasts in mid-August 2008, and on September 4, 2008, took over production of all newscasts at CHCA-TV (the E! station in Red Deer, Alberta). Global Calgary began production of Global Lethbridge's newscasts in mid-September, and later in the year Global BC took over CHEK Victoria, Global Regina, Global Saskatoon, Global Winnipeg and Global Montreal. In August 2009, production for Global News Montreal moved from Vancouver to Edmonton. The stations whose controls were taken over began using virtual sets. In September 2009, CHBC's controls were moved to Calgary (master control) and Vancouver (production control), and the station launched its own virtual set in July 2010.

On May 31, 2011, Shaw Media announced that new weekday local morning shows would be launched on Global Toronto, Global Winnipeg, Global Saskatoon, Global Regina and Global Maritimes in late 2011. Local Sunday morning newscasts were also announced for Global Edmonton and Global Calgary, which launched in September 2011. The increase in news programming is part of a benefits package that Shaw Media has promised to fulfill as a condition to purchasing the network.

On May 30, 2012, Shaw Media announced further expansions to Global's news programming offerings, with the launch of a new half-hour noon newscast on Global Toronto on August 27, and the expansion of primetime newscasts on Global Winnipeg, Global Saskatoon, Global Regina to one hour (and in turn, re-branding them from Prime News to News Hour Final) on August 20. The previously announced weekday morning newscasts on Global Montreal and Global Maritimes were also confirmed to launch in fall 2012 on dates yet to be determined (their launches were later postponed to early 2013). Local morning newscasts on Global BC, Global Edmonton and Global Calgary were also expanded, with the weekday morning newscasts on all three stations lengthened to four hours on August 27, and the Sunday morning news programs expanding to three hours starting September 2, 2012. 16:9 was also moved from Saturdays to Friday nights, and Global News' website also received a redesign in early 2013 with compatibility for mobile devices in mind.

=== Centralization ===
On April 9, 2015, Shaw announced cutbacks of Global's local news operations and a subsequent re-organization. Under these changes, which began to take effect in August 2015, production of late night and weekend newscasts in markets outside of Calgary, Edmonton, Vancouver, and Toronto, are centralized out of Global's studios in Toronto. Anchors and meteorologists are provided by the centralized news operation, while local stories are presented by the station's reporters.

Local morning shows in these markets also switched to a hybrid local/national format with an eight-minute long national segment every half-hour. Local morning shows and evening newscasts otherwise continue to be produced locally. Troy Reeb, Global's senior vice president of news and station operations, explained that these changes would allow individual stations to devote more resources to the creation of local news content for television and digital platforms, and reduce redundancy in their coverage of national headlines. Reeb also explained that the changes were meant to allow staff reductions, whilst allowing the network to "find innovative ways" to distribute news content; at least 80 jobs were lost nationwide as part of the process.

In June 2015, Global announced that it had acquired Canadian rights to The Late Show with Stephen Colbert. Late newscasts were kept at or shortened to 35 minutes in markets where The Late Show was to air in simulcast with CBS at 11:35 p.m. for simsub purposes, including Halifax, Kelowna, Montreal, New Brunswick, Toronto, and Vancouver. Shaw had previously announced that it would extend its late newscasts in Halifax, Montreal, and New Brunswick to a full hour; to compensate for the change, Global Montreal instead introduced a half-hour noon newscast, and expanded its evening news to an hour. In markets with hour-long late newscasts, The Late Show was tape-delayed to air at the top of the hour instead.

Centralization of news presentation was partially reverted as of January 2019. 11:00 p.m. newscasts east of Manitoba were still anchored from Toronto. Global Regina, Global Saskatoon, and Global Winnipeg no longer use Toronto anchors for their 10:00 p.m. local newscasts. Further decentralization occurred as of March 2021, with the three prairie stations centralizing their weekday evening newscast production through a new MMC base out of Global Regina's facility. The Saskatchewan 5 p.m. news, the Regina and Saskatoon 6 and 10 p.m. newscasts, and the Winnipeg 10:00 p.m. news, are presented in an MMC format by an anchor from Global's Winnipeg studios. Global Winnipeg's 6:00 p.m newscast continues to be presented live from Winnipeg.

In July 2026, Global cancelled its morning newscasts in Montreal, Halifax, Winnipeg, Saskatoon and Regina, and replaced them with a national Global News Morning produced out of Toronto. Local morning shows were maintained in Calgary, Edmonton, and Vancouver, although Corus also announced that month that Calgary and Edmonton would centralize production for their news operations out of Toronto.

== News channels ==
On January 11, 2012, Shaw Media announced it had filed an application with the Canadian Radio-television and Telecommunications Commission (CRTC) to launch a 24-hour Vancouver-based regional news network (to be licensed as a Category B digital cable specialty channel). The channel, tentatively named Global News: BC 1, will become the fourth regional news channel in Canada and the first located outside of Ontario, and will be operated by Global BC and utilize its news staff. Proposed programming includes a primetime talk show hosted by Global BC senior reporter Jill Krop. Initially slated to launch in summer 2012, CRTC licensing delays have led the launch to be rescheduled for March 14, 2013.

On September 22, 2014, Shaw Media filed an application with the CRTC to launch a national news channel, to be branded as Global News 1. Billed as a "hybrid" local and national news channel, the service would broadcast news reports from Global's national news bureau and its local stations, and would open eight new newsrooms in underserved areas of Canada. The application is pending CRTC approval. According to a news release, Global News 1 was intended to launch in 2016 but there were no further updates on the channel after its initial announcement.

=== Global News 24/7 Online ===
On March 2, 2020, Corus Entertainment officially launched their new Global TV app and website which included more options for streaming live channels, including 24-hour Global News feeds. Similar to the proposed Global News 1 concept, users can select their region from a list of Global markets to receive local newscasts, national news headlines, live news events, and weather in the ticker on the side of the screen. The content of the newscasts are nationally produced using Global's multi-market anchors at Toronto and local anchors from its Calgary and Vancouver newsrooms. If a local market is selected, the feed will be replaced with that market's local newscast at their scheduled airing times. As of April 2022, feeds from all Global stations (except Global New Brunswick and Global Durham) are available. Unlike the other channels available for streaming on the Global TV app and website, the Global News 24/7 channels do not require a sign-in by a TV provider and can be accessed completely free of charge. The service was expanded to Amazon Prime Video in early April 2020. It is available free of charge to all Amazon users, without an Amazon Prime subscription required; local feeds for BC, Toronto, Edmonton, and Calgary, as well as the national Indi Global News 24/7 feed is available on Prime.

==== Global News Weekend ====
Global News Weekend, a new national morning show streaming exclusively through the Global TV app and globaltv.com, was announced on April 24, 2020. The show is hosted by Global Toronto personalities Aalia Adams and Mike Arsenault. Airing from 7am to 10am ET on Saturdays and Sundays, the show provides viewers with "content ranging from the latest breaking news to exciting and in-depth interviews and frequent, detailed weather reports."

== Global News Radio ==
In 2017, Corus Radio began to re-brand news talk and all-news radio stations in major markets under the banner Global News Radio to create synergies with its television news programming.

As of January 2022, the "Global News Radio" brand is no longer in use on Corus' news-talk stations as the primary brand; however, hourly and half-hourly news bulletins on those stations remain branded as "Global News".

Stations that formerly operated under the branding:

Province	City	Call Sign	Format
Alberta	Calgary	CHQR	News talk
Alberta	Edmonton	CHED	News talk
British Columbia
British Columbia	Vancouver	CKNW	News talk
Manitoba
Manitoba	Winnipeg	CJOB	News talk
Ontario
Ontario	London	CFPL	News talk
Ontario	Toronto	CFIQ	News talk

== Criticism ==
In July 2010, Global National showed footage of a demonstration at the 2010 Winter Olympics in a segment about a Toronto march held by groups demanding a public inquiry into police actions during a G20 conference. The report included clips of violence that erupted on Toronto streets during the event. After this was reported in Canadian blog Insights, Global claimed it was an "unintentional editing error".
