= 2001 Vancouver TV realignment =

Realignment of television stations in Canada

- Date: June 2, 2000 – September 1, 2001
- Location: British Columbia, Canada
- Caused by: Baton Broadcasting's acquisition of a majority stake in CTV in 1997; Canwest's acquisition of Western International Communications in 2000; Variances among schedules between CTV owned-and-operated stations and affiliates
- Result: CHAN takes over as the Global owned-and-operated station for the Vancouver market, while CITV becomes a CTV owned-and-operated station; CIVI begins operations in October 2001; Citytv begins operations across Canada in July 2002

In 2001, the Vancouver/Victoria, British Columbia, television market saw a major shuffling of network affiliations, involving nearly all of the area's broadcast television stations, amounting to every privately-owned station. This was one of the largest single-market affiliation realignments in the history of North American television, and had a number of significant effects on television broadcasting across Canada and into the United States.

== Origins ==
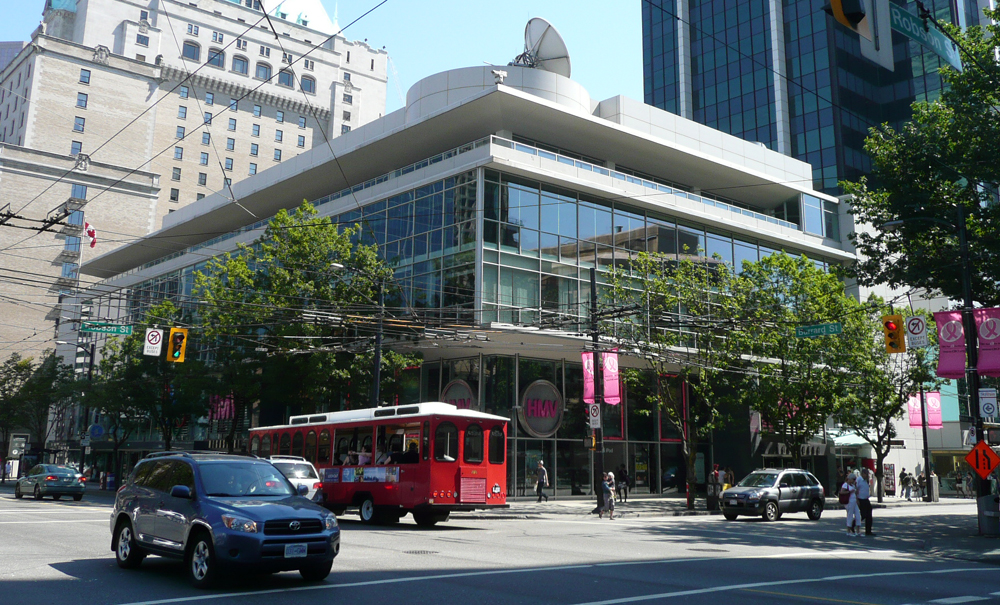
CIVT's facilities at 750 Burrard Street.

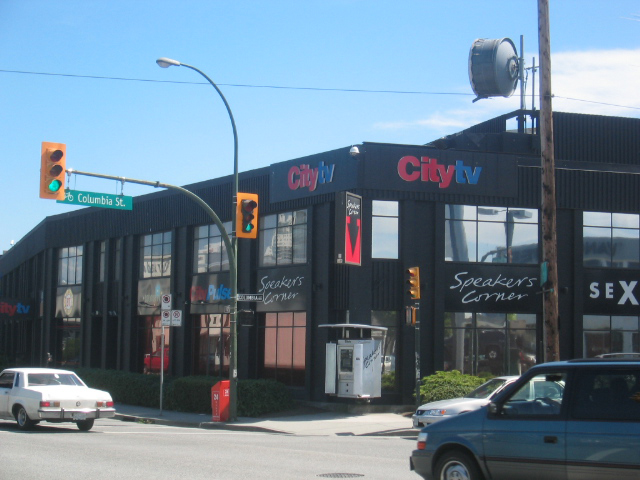
CKVU's studio at 180 West 2nd Avenue in Vancouver.

The realignment resulted from Canwest Global Communications's acquisition of Western International Communications (WIC) in 2000. In most of the markets where a WIC-owned station was involved in the deal, the acquisition gave Canwest Global independent stations that were integrated into either the latter company's Global Television Network or the newly formed CH television system; in one case, a CTV-affiliated station (CFCF-TV in Montreal) was sold directly to CTV to become an owned-and-operated station (O&O) of the network. In Vancouver, however, the acquisition gave Canwest Global one of the most lucrative prizes in the entire country: control of CHAN-TV (channel 8), the market's CTV affiliate. CHAN, better known as "BCTV," had been Vancouver's highest-rated television station for decades, and one of the highest-rated stations in the country. It also boasted a massive network of rebroadcasters covering over 95 percent of British Columbia, unlike Global's existing Vancouver station CKVU-TV.

CHAN's relationship with the CTV network in the years prior to the realignment had been rocky. Historically, CHAN and some of the other affiliates in Western Canada had resented the dominance of the affiliates in the eastern part of the country, especially Toronto flagship CFTO-TV (channel 9), in the production of network programming, in regards to both entertainment shows and news programming. The station had desired for years to host a national news program; when it was rebuffed by CTV, it instead launched the early-evening Canada Tonight on the WIC station group in 1993.

These issues were exacerbated in 1997 when the original owner of CFTO, Baton Broadcasting, acquired controlling interest in CTV after over a quarter-century of buying CTV affiliates. Shortly thereafter, Baton revamped the CTV schedule to incorporate the programming of the former Baton Broadcast System. That same year, Baton launched a new Vancouver station, CIVT (channel 32, known on-air as "Vancouver Television" or "VTV").

Since CTV did not previously offer a network schedule covering the entire day (or even all of primetime), these changes meant that CTV now maintained two different programming streams: a base "network" schedule which aired on all CTV stations, both O&Os and affiliates, under the network's existing affiliation agreements; and a separate "non-network" block of programming which aired in its entirety on O&Os, although CTV would offer rights on a per-program basis to affiliates in markets where the company did not have a station of its own. In much of Canada, this was a meaningless distinction, as most CTV stations were already O&Os — but in Vancouver, the network programming aired on CHAN while the O&O programming aired on CIVT.

CHAN's Victoria-based sister station CHEK (channel 6) was itself a CTV affiliate and therefore carried the same stream of network programming as CHAN; however, since the Vancouver stations' footprint covered much of the Victoria area and vice versa, CTV network programs would usually air on CHEK on alternative nights and/or in different timeslots compared to CHAN.

This meant that for the four years between CIVT's launch and the 2001 realignment, CHAN and CIVT were effectively in competition with each other for programming to which CTV held the broadcast rights – the network sometimes reclassified programs from one stream to the other, possibly to help boost CIVT in the Vancouver ratings, in any event often leaving CHAN with little control over portions of its own program schedule because it could lose programs to CIVT at the network's discretion. It was also widely expected, although not publicly confirmed by CTV until after Canwest announced its plans for CHAN, that the network would simply transfer all of its programming to CIVT when its affiliation agreements with CHAN and CHEK ended.

As a result of the WIC takeover, Global assumed ownership of CHAN and chose to retain it instead of its existing O&O CKVU-TV (channel 10), which had less transmitting power and no rebroadcasting. Due to rules on media ownership set forth by the Canadian Radio-television and Telecommunications Commission (CRTC), which prohibit common ownership of two or more English language stations in a major market that have the same city of license, Global could not retain both stations simultaneously with CHEK in Victoria, so it put CKVU on the market. CKVU's sale to CHUM Limited for CA$125 million was announced on April 13, 2001, and was approved by the CRTC on October 15 of that year.

CHAN and CHEK's affiliation agreements with CTV were originally due to end in September 2000; in view of the uncertainty surrounding the local media landscape, CTV and Canwest renewed those agreements for an additional year, set to expire on September 1, 2001, which became the date for the affiliation switch.

== Affiliation changes and new stations ==
Call sign	Channel	Former affiliation	New affiliation	Notes
CHEK-TV	6	CTV	CH (Global)	CH was rebranded as E! in September 2007; CHEK was relaunched as an independent station in 2009 after the end of the E! system. Shared the CTV affiliation with CHAN.
CHAN-TV	8	CTV	Global	Shared the CTV affiliation with CHEK.
CKVU-TV	10	Global	Independent, then Citytv	Nominally an independent station before its sale to CHUM Limited was finalized.
KVOS-TV	12	Independent / Citytv (secondary)	Independent	Licensed to Bellingham, Washington, but targeted the Vancouver/Victoria market.
CIVT-TV	32	Independent	CTV	Already owned by CTV, but operated as an Independent
CIVI-TV	53	new station	NewNet	Launched in October 2001 as "The New VI", then rebranded as A-Channel in 2005, again in 2008 as A, and followed in 2011 as CTV Two before adopting the current CTV 2 Vancouver Island brand in 2018.
CHNU-TV	66	new station	Independent	Launched in September 2001 as "NOWTV". Renamed to Omni 10 in 2004 and again as Joytv in 2008.

At the time, the only broadcast television stations in Vancouver and Victoria to be unaffected by the switch were CBC Television O&O CBUT and Télévision de Radio-Canada O&O CBUFT (CHNM-TV, currently part of the Omni Television system, did not sign on until 2003). Further complicating the situation were the launches of CHNU in Fraser Valley on September 15 and CIVI in Victoria on October 4, which caused various changes to cable channel lineups within the region.

CKVU became a de facto Citytv station on the date of the affiliation switch, with its programming immediately provided and scheduled by CHUM Limited. However, as its sale to CHUM had not yet been finalized, the station was branded as "ckvu13" and did not officially adopt the Citytv brand name until 2002.

== Effects in Vancouver ==
"We can get rid of this baby!" CKVU-TV reporter Joe Leary removes the Global mic flag from his microphone on the station's last day as a Global O&O.

The affiliation switch took place on September 1, 2001. However, as that date fell on the Labour Day long weekend, some changes resulting from the switch (such as the new 5:00 to 7:00 a.m. timeslot for CIVT's morning newscast, for example) did not occur until September 4.

CHAN's local newscasts had historically been the overwhelming ratings leader in the Vancouver market, leaving CIVT's news team in the position – a rarity for CTV – of having to build a reputation and an audience against the market dominance of another station. To that end, CIVT recruited Bill Good and Pamela Martin from CHAN to serve as its primary anchor team. CIVT also adopted "BC CTV" as its on-air branding; it is widely believed that this brand name was deliberately chosen to confuse viewers, as CHAN had previously been branded "BCTV" and continued to call its news operation BCTV News on Global until 2006 (although CHAN began to de-emphasize the hybrid branding in 2003). CIVT changed its on-air brand to simply "CTV" exactly ten months later on July 1, 2002; "CTV British Columbia" (or, occasionally, "CTV9," in reference to CIVT's channel number on most Vancouver area cable providers) is used where disambiguation from the network or other CTV O&Os is warranted.

CIVT's news ratings rose significantly: the station's 6:00 p.m. newscast attracted around 36,000 viewers in 2002; that number improved to 72,000 viewers by December 2010, and occasionally reaches as high as 100,000, though still well behind that of CHAN's 303,000 viewers from the same period. CIVT effectively became Vancouver's second-place television news operation, replacing CKVU, which lost approximately half of its audience and dropped to last place when it adopted the CityPulse format. CKVU's newscasts continued to struggle in the ensuing years, and the 6:00 and 11:00 p.m. newscasts were cancelled in 2006, ahead of CHUM's merger with CTVglobemedia and the subsequent sale of the Citytv stations (including CKVU) to Rogers Media in 2007 (CKVU continues to produce Breakfast Television, which was launched in 2002 in conjunction with the Citytv brand).

== National impact ==
Across Canada, the most visible effects of the Vancouver realignment included:

- The launch of Global National, Global's nightly newscast which originates from CHAN's Burnaby studios (the weekday edition was presented from Ottawa between 2008 and 2010), and the associated establishment of Global's national news division;
- the integration of the former WIC-owned independent stations CHEK, CHCH (in Hamilton) and CJNT (in Montreal) into the CH television system; and
- the transformation of Citytv from a single independent station in Toronto into a full-fledged television system.

CHAN had – and continues to have – a much larger network of rebroadcasters than CIVT, meaning that CTV lost almost all of its terrestrial coverage in British Columbia outside of the Greater Vancouver and Victoria area, and to this day still relies on cable television, not terrestrial transmitters, to reach most of the province. This gave a significant boost to Global, and a corresponding handicap to CTV, in the national television ratings during the early 2000s. However, with CTV generally outspending Global on hit television series over the next number of years, and continuing reductions in the number of viewers relying solely on over-the-air broadcasts, this advantage had largely dissipated by 2006. As a consequence of continuing reductions of over-the-air-viewers, CBUT shut down its network of rebroadcasters in 2012, although that was the result of budget cuts to the CBC.

== Impact in the United States ==
The realignment also had some effects in the United States, where Bellingham, Washington station KVOS-TV (channel 12), which had previously carried some Citytv programming due to its proximity to Vancouver, lost this programming source now that Citytv had its own station in the market. KVOS was also displaced from its prime position on cable providers in both Vancouver and Victoria to make room for CIVI, causing the station to lose significant market share in British Columbia.

Kevin Newman, then working for ABC News, left that network and returned to Canada as the anchor and executive editor of Global National; he held both positions until leaving Global in 2010.

== See also ==
- Media in Vancouver
- 1989 South Florida television affiliation switch
- 1994–1996 United States broadcast television realignment
- 2006 United States broadcast television realignment
- 2007 Canada broadcast TV realignment
