= Prime News =

Prime News may refer to:

- Prime News (Canadian TV program), a Canadian news program that previously aired in Regina, Saskatoon and Winnipeg under this title
- Prime News New Zealand, a news bulletin shown on Prime Television New Zealand, produced by MediaWorks
- Prime7 News, a local news service in Australia, produced by Prime7, formerly known as Prime News
