= Mi-Jung Lee =

Canadian journalist

Mi-Jung Lee (Korean: 이미정; born September 12, 1966 in Chuncheon, Gangwon-do, South Korea) is a Canadian television journalist and news anchor based in Vancouver, British Columbia. She formerly co-anchored the weeknight 6pm newscast alongside Scott Roberts on CTV Vancouver, Roberts has since moved on to Global TV Edmonton and Lee is anchoring solo.

== Biography ==
She moved with her family from South Korea to Vancouver at age 4, and graduated from Sir Charles Tupper Secondary School in 1984. She then completed an undergraduate degree in English literature at the University of British Columbia, and later a post-graduate degree in journalism at Ryerson University.

She began her on-air career in 1990 as a reporter and part-time anchor at CHEK-TV in Victoria, then moved to CHAN-TV (BCTV, then CTV's Vancouver affiliate) in 1992 and served in similar capacities, eventually anchoring that station's News Hour Final weeknights until 1998. That year she joined CIVT-TV (then independent station VTV) as 6pm news co-anchor alongside Paul Mennier. When CIVT became a CTV owned-and-operated station as part of the 2001 Vancouver TV realignment, Lee became anchor and producer of the station's 11:30pm newscast. She also briefly co-hosted the Western Canada edition of CTV's national breakfast television program Canada AM from January 2008 until its cancellation in June that year. She returned to CIVT's weeknight 6pm newscast as co-anchor in August 2018, after Mike Killeen and Tamara Taggart were let go from the station earlier that year.

Lee has appeared as a reporter or news anchor in several TV shows and films including Snakes on a Plane, Doctor Who (film), X-Men: The Last Stand, Tron: Legacy, Hot Rod and Watchmen.

== Filmography ==
Year	Title	Role	Notes
1996	Doctor Who: The Movie	News Anchor	
2000	The 6th Day	Newscaster	
2003	X2	News Reporter	
2006	X-Men: The Last Stand	Newscaster	
2006	Snakes on a Plane	News Anchor	
2007	The Invisible	Newscaster	
2007	Hot Rod	Newswoman	
2009	Watchmen	A Bomb Test Anchorwoman	
2010	Tron: Legacy	Debra Chung	
