= Tony Parsons (presenter) =

Canadian journalist

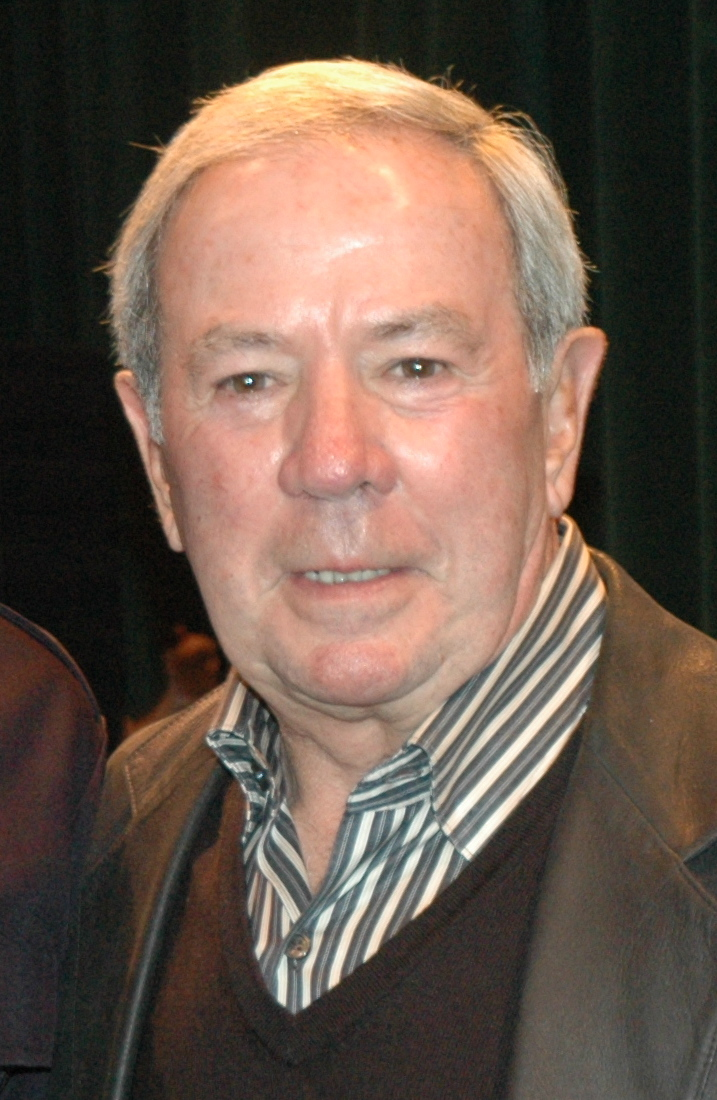
- Born: Anthony Parsonage; 1939 (age 86–87); Gosport, Hampshire, England
- Occupations: News anchor for CHAN-DT, CBUT-DT and CHEK-DT
- Known for: Television news anchor / reporter

Tony Parsons (born 1939) is a Canadian broadcaster whose career has spanned more than 50 years, and he has anchored the second most-watched local evening Television newscast in North America, the News Hour on Global BC in Vancouver, British Columbia. He was the co-anchor of CBC News: Vancouver on CBUT-DT with Gloria Macarenko, and the 10:00 pm (22:00 military) newscast on CHEK-DT. He lives in Kelowna, British Columbia and presents a podcast, The Tony Parsons Show.

Parsons' father was a flight-lieutenant in the Royal Air Force. His mother was of Italian descent. His family immigrated to Canada from England in 1948, settling in Feversham, Ontario. After a year studying radio and television arts at the Ryerson Institute in Toronto, he looked for work at Ontario radio stations and eventually shortened his name from Parsonage to Tony Parsons. His first broadcasting job was as a country and western DJ at CJCS in Stratford, Ontario. He worked at various radio jobs in Stratford, Guelph, and Hamilton, before landing in Toronto. After a brief stint with CHUM radio, he took his first television job as a reporter at CFTO-TV, a CTV affiliate.

Parsons advanced to become the late evening anchor at CFTO until 1975, when he accepted the opportunity to fill the 6:00 anchor spot on CHAN-TV (better known as BCTV) in Vancouver, where he remained for more than 30 years. He was also the anchor of the national edition of Canada Tonight, a CHAN-produced newscast which aired outside of BC on stations owned by Western International Communications until that company was acquired by the Global Television Network. (Bill Good anchored the BC version seen on BCTV.) In 2004, his career achievements were recognized by his being awarded the Bruce Hutchison Lifetime Achievement Award by the Jack Webster Foundation.

Parsons had a cameo in the 2001 film Saving Silverman (also known as Evil Woman) as a TV anchor. The same year he appeared, once again as a news anchor, in the Jack Nicholson film The Pledge.

In 2002, Parsons was named Italo-Canadian of the year by the Confratellanza Italo-Canadese.

In May 2007, Parsons announced his intention to phase himself out of the anchor chair at the News Hour, with plans to work Tuesdays and Wednesdays until the 2010 Winter Olympics, after which he planned to retire and make documentaries.

However, on December 16, 2009, Parsons anchored his final newscast at Global BC after 35 years as anchor of the News Hour. A day earlier he had confirmed his rather sudden departure in an email to radio station CKNW. It had been expected that he would remain until after the Olympics, but for unknown reasons, Parsons left the station much earlier than expected. He was replaced by Chris Gailus. Parsons went to CHEK-TV in Victoria to anchor the 10 pm newscast starting on March 15.

On April 12, 2010, it was announced that Parsons would co-anchor CBUT's evening newscast, CBC News: Vancouver, replacing co-anchor Ian Hanomansing who left to work as a reporter and substitute anchor for CBC News: The National. Parsons would continue to host the 10 PM newscast for CHEK-TV. After his CBC evening broadcast, he would fly to Victoria (where he also resides with his wife), often by helicopter, to anchor the 10 pm news on CHEK-TV. On December 20, 2013, Parsons retired as co-anchor on CBC News: Vancouver.

Parsons has written a book on his journalistic career, called A Life in the News. On November 23, 2009, he opened a Vancouver restaurant, the Poor Italian in which he has a part-ownership stake.

In 2024, Parsons launched a podcast, The Tony Parsons Show, with interviews and discussions of current events, pop culture, and trending topics. The podcast has drawn attention for its high-profile guests and Parsons' signature conversational style, marking a new chapter in his storied broadcasting career.
