= Canada Tonight =

Canadian national television newscast

- National Canada Tonight logo, used from 1998 to 2001. The BCTV version used BCTV's logo in place of the maple leaf.
- Genre: News program
- Presented by: Tony Parsons (national edition); Donna Skelly (national edition, 1993–1994); Bill Good (BCTV edition)
- Country of origin: Canada
- Original language: English

Production
- Production locations: Burnaby, British Columbia
- Running time: 60 minutes (1993–1994); 30 minutes (1994–2001)
- Production companies: Western International Communications (1993-2000); Canwest (2000-2001)

Original release
- Network: WIC/BCTV (1993-2001); Global (2001)
- Release: September 7, 1993 – August 31, 2001

Related
- Global National

Canada Tonight is a Canadian television newscast which aired on stations owned by Western International Communications (WIC) from 1993 to 2001. It was produced out of the studio of CHAN-TV (BCTV) in Burnaby, British Columbia. There were two versions of the newscast; the one seen outside British Columbia was anchored by Tony Parsons, and the one seen in that province was anchored by Bill Good. The British Columbia version, seen only on BCTV, featured more stories related to Vancouver and British Columbia, as well as local weather and some national news reports sourced from CTV, which WIC's other stations were unable to use.

== History ==
As a charter CTV affiliate, British Columbia Television had carried the network's Toronto-based national newscast. However, the late night time slot for CTV National News was seen by BCTV as a competitive disadvantage against the early evening network newscasts on the U.S. television networks, in particular the CBS Evening News with Walter Cronkite. After failing to convince CTV to introduce a suppertime national newscast, BCTV decided in the mid-1970s to instead retool its own early evening local newscast into the News Hour, presented by Tony Parsons. News Hour later became the most-watched newscast in the region, and remains so to this day.

Executives at BCTV also perceived a Toronto-bias in the production of CTV National News, and as such continued to push for a Vancouver-based national newscast. The station produced pilots for CTV's board in 1990; however, the proposal was turned down by the network. As a result, WIC decided in 1993 to launch its own early evening semi-national newscast, Canada Tonight. The newscast was a joint production of BCTV and WIC's recently acquired CHCH in Hamilton, Ontario, and was co-anchored by Tony Parsons and CHCH's Donna Skelly; it also aired on WIC's independent stations in Alberta. However, as BCTV, CITV in Edmonton and CHCH were all uplinked to satellite by Cancom (now Shaw Broadcast Services) for nationwide distribution, this meant many could watch the program via their cable companies (if they carried one of the three stations outside of their primary areas, as a superstation) or satellite dishes, thus expanding the newscast's reach.

The program originally aired at 7 p.m. Eastern Time and ran for an hour. However, performance was poor in the Toronto market. Co-anchor Skelly did not even appear in the first broadcast until nearly 20 minutes in, while the two-city production was often affected by technical problems and satellite issues. On January 31, 1994, CHCH retooled its evening news lineup, which directly affected Canada Tonight; the program moved to 6:30 p.m. and was cut back to 30 minutes. Parsons became the sole anchor, while Skelly moved off the show and began anchoring The Evening News, a half-hour provincial news program that preceded Canada Tonight on CHCH.

As the newscast was produced out of BCTV, it utilized the newsroom set used by BCTV's local newscasts, although BCTV's logos and branding were typically concealed or replaced by Canada Tonight logos; a similar set was also built in Hamilton. Beginning in 1994, the national newscast began to use variants of BCTV's local news graphics, with the BCTV "flower" replaced by an abstract red maple leaf, typically placed in a white box. Beginning in 1996, the same music package heard on BCTV's local newscasts replaced the separate themes used by Canada Tonight.

Following Canwest Global's purchase of WIC in 2000, the Global Television Network announced its plans to launch a new network newscast in September 2001, to be produced by a newly established national news division based at BCTV (itself to become a Global owned-and-operated station). In the interim, Canada Tonight replaced First National, a regional newscast seen on Global stations in Ontario, Quebec and Manitoba (CHCH had already dropped the show and replaced it with an hour-long local newscast in 1999); this also meant that BCTV's localized version replaced their CTV-sourced news stories with stories sourced from other Global stations.

One unusual feature of the national version of the newscast which normally aired on Friday evenings was a segment called "Satellite Debris", presented by BCTV sports anchor Squire Barnes, which featured some of the week's humorous or less newsworthy news items. On the Friday before the NFL's Super Bowl in the United States, it also previewed some of the advertisements that could not be seen in Canada through cable or satellite distribution due to simultaneous substitution regulations. (On BCTV, this segment aired as part of the 6:00 p.m. News Hour, and indeed continues as part of the Friday newscast on Global BC.)

Canada Tonight concluded its run on August 31, 2001, and was replaced on September 3 by Global National, the network's new flagship news program hosted by journalist Kevin Newman.

== See also ==
- 2001 Vancouver TV realignment, which signalled the end of the newscast
