= Shaw Multicultural Channel =

Cable television channel in Vancouver, British Columbia, Canada

- Country: Canada
- Broadcast area: Greater Vancouver; Calgary Region
- Headquarters: Vancouver, British Columbia; Calgary, Alberta

Ownership
- Owner: Shaw Communications; Rogers Communications

History
- Launched: September 3, 1979; 46 years ago
- Closed: September 15, 2024; 22 months ago
- Replaced by: Omni Television
- Former names: Rogers Multicultural Channel (1979–2000)

Links
- Website: https://www.multicultural.shaw.ca/

Shaw Multicultural Channel (or simply Shaw Multicultural) was a Canadian multicultural community channel operated by Shaw Communications. It was carried on Shaw's cable systems in the Vancouver and Calgary markets, and broadcast various programs reflecting different cultural groups, including imported programs from international broadcasters, and locally-produced programs (such as coverage of cultural events).

== History ==
The channel was launched in 1979 as Rogers Multicultural Channel, under the ownership of Rogers Communications, and was available only in the Vancouver market on Rogers Cable. Shaw took over ownership and renamed the channel in 2000 following an asset swap with Rogers, which also saw Shaw become the primary cable television service provider in British Columbia. Service was subsequently extended to the Calgary market.

Former logo

In 2023, control of the channel returned to Rogers with its acquisition of Shaw. In September 2024, Rogers announced that Shaw Multicultural would close on September 15, 2024, with its programming moved to its Omni Television network (served locally by CJCO-DT Calgary and CHNM-DT Vancouver).

== Programming ==
At closing time, it broadcast local programmes catering individual communities, as well as news programmes from New Tang Dynasty Television and the Big Bad Boo series 16 Hudson and 1001 Nights. The channel aired content in eighteen languages:

- Bengali
- Cantonese
- Croatian
- English
- Fiji-Hindi
- German
- Hindi

- Hungarian
- Italian
- Korean
- Mandarin
- Persian
- Punjabi
- Tagalog

- Taiwanese
- Tamil
- Thai
- Urdu

In the past, the channel also aired programmes in Serbian, Romanian, Polish, Russian, Kurdish, Dari, Pashto, Japanese and Slovak, with more programmes sourced from other broadcasters. In 2007, the channel carried NHK News 7, KBS News 9, CTI News (Midday and Primetime), TV Patrol World and Wiadomości, South Asian feature films (in Hindi and Punjabi), the Korean show Music Bank and a pre-packaged programme assembled by Markíza, featuring highlights of its entertainment productions, Najlepšie z Markízy. From 2012 to 2016, the channel partnered with Global News to produce a Chinese-language newscast, Global National Mandarin.
