= Chris Gailus =

Canadian journalist

Chris Gailus (/ˈɡeɪlʌs/; born 29 October 1967) is a Canadian television news anchor who works for Global BC.

Gailus graduated from the Broadcast Journalism Program at Mount Royal University in Calgary in 1989, where he made the Dean's List and played basketball. He began his career in Lethbridge, Alberta, and stayed there for three years. He joined Calgary's CFCN-TV in 1992, then moved on to CICT-TV in 1997.

After marrying fellow anchor Jane Carrigan, Gailus took a post anchoring the morning news on WFAA-TV in Dallas in 2000. He joined New York City WNYW in April 2003, and began serving as anchor on the station's morning program Good Day New York.

Gailus returned to Canada and joined CHAN-TV (Global BC) in Vancouver on May 1, 2006 as weekend anchor. As of September 2010, he currently anchors the Monday to Friday editions of the News Hour when longtime anchor Tony Parsons left Global TV for broadcasting in Victoria, BC. As of October 2020, he currently anchors the Monday to Friday editions with Sophie Lui of the Global News Hour at 6 weeknights at 6pm.

Gailus appeared in the motion picture Fantastic Four: Rise of the Silver Surfer (2007) and the Sonic the Hedgehog movie (2020), as a news anchor.

Gailus became a father in August 2011, when he and Carrigan adopted their son William Alexander Gailus.
