= Eric Sorensen (journalist) =

Canadian journalist

Eric Sorensen is a Canadian television journalist. He has been the national affairs correspondent for Global National since early 2014, and served as Washington, D.C. bureau chief for Global National, from November 2006 to 2014. Sorensen was previously a reporter for CBC Television's The National from 1992 until joining Global News in 2006.

Born in Hearst, Ontario and raised in Port Colborne, Ontario, He began his broadcasting career in 1973 at CHOW Radio in Welland, Ontario. He graduated from Ryerson Polytechnical Institute radio and television arts program in 1976. He worked for a variety of television and radio stations across Canada before joining the CBC's national news division, and was the first Canadian to receive the Benton Fellowship in Broadcast Journalism from the University of Chicago in 1984.
