= E! (Canadian TV system) =

Former Canadian television system

- Type: Broadcast television system
- Country: Canada
- Broadcast area: Semi-national - Ontario, B.C., Alberta, Montreal (Quebec); available in several U.S. states via cable
- Headquarters: Toronto, Ontario, Canada

Ownership
- Owner: Canwest (branding licensed from Comcast / NBCUniversal)
- Parent: Canwest Media Inc.
- Key people: Leonard Asper (CEO, Canwest); Kathleen Dore (President, Radio and Television, Canwest Media)
- Sister channels: Global Television Network; Prime/TVTropolis; DejaView; Mystery; mentv; CoolTV; X-Treme Sports

History
- Launched: February 12, 2001; 25 years ago
- Closed: September 1, 2009; 17 years ago (8 years, 201 days)
- Former names: CH (2001–2007)

The first incarnation of E!, also referred to as E! Entertainment Television, was a Canadian English language privately owned television system that existed from 2001 to 2009 under the ownership of Canwest. At its peak it consisted of eight local television stations located in Quebec, Ontario, Alberta and British Columbia, including five stations owned and operated (O&O) by Canwest and three affiliates owned by Jim Pattison Group.

The system was launched in 2001 as CH Television or CH (derived from the call sign of flagship CHCH-TV in Hamilton), providing a secondary schedule parallel to Canwest's larger Global Television Network. It initially focused on airing programs from the U.S. broadcast networks that could not fit on Global's own schedule, in order to avail of simultaneous substitution opportunities. The system became "E!" in fall 2007, as a result of a deal with Comcast to carry programming from that company's U.S.-based E!: Entertainment Television, although it continued to air much of the same American network series in primetime and the afternoon.

Following corporate financial difficulties, which eventually led to the company filing for bankruptcy protection and the sale of their properties to Shaw Media, Canwest announced in early 2009 it would look to either sell or close its E! O&Os by that fall. Those stations saw varied fates as E! ceased operations on August 31, 2009: two stations (CHCH and CJNT-TV Montreal) were sold to Channel Zero; CHEK-TV Victoria was sold to a consortium of local investors and station employees; CHBC-TV Kelowna was converted to a Global O&O; and CHCA-TV Red Deer was shut down entirely. The three Pattison-owned affiliates subsequently joined Rogers Media's City network, as did CJNT several years later. This left CHCH and CHEK as the only independent former stations of this system to still exist.

E! in the U.S. (now owned by NBCUniversal) later reached an agreement to bring the channel's brand and programming to Bell Media's entertainment specialty channel, previously known as Star!, effective late November 2010.

== History ==
=== Purchase of WIC stations by Canwest ===
The CH/E! system had its roots in the television stations group owned by Western International Communications (WIC), which at one point owned ten stations, including three CTV affiliates, two CBC affiliates, three independent stations in Alberta that mostly carried programming from Global, Montreal multicultural station CJNT-TV, and independent station CHCH-TV Hamilton.

Aside from CHCH, many of WIC's stations were involved in various types of "twinsticks", or a set of two stations serving one market under a single owner – specifically in the British Columbia Lower Mainland, Alberta, Montreal, and Kelowna markets. The second stations were, respectively, CHEK-TV, CKRD-TV, CJNT-TV, and CHBC-TV.

WIC was an ownership group, and not a network unto itself; the company was rarely able to co-ordinate the programming of its first-string stations, much less the second-string outlets, due to the stations' different network affiliations. Even so, during the 1990s, WIC had been stepping up its acquisitions of American programming, eventually acquiring shows such as Everybody Loves Raymond, Will & Grace, Suddenly Susan, Just Shoot Me!, and Touched by an Angel.

These programs were broadcast on CHCH (which was rebranded "ONtv" in 1997 in an effort to broaden the station into a province-wide outlet, a change that was not popular with the station's core Hamilton audience), and on its other stations when timeslots were available. For example, in the Vancouver area in the late 1990s, CTV network programming – i.e. the 40 hours per week not aired on VTV – would air in-pattern on BCTV, with some WIC programming airing in the remaining timeslots. On CHEK, the same CTV programs would generally air out-of-pattern, with additional WIC programming scheduled for the remaining timeslots when BCTV was airing network programs. This effectively gave WIC one "full" station to program itself in the Vancouver market. Similarly, in Alberta, Global or WIC programs that could not fit onto the schedules of WIC's Calgary or Edmonton stations would instead air on Red Deer CBC affiliate CKRD, available on cable in much of the province, in non-network timeslots.

Canwest reached an agreement to purchase WIC's conventional television arm in 1999. Its plan to keep all of the WIC stations, save CFCF-TV in Montreal, faced strong opposition from competitors and advocacy groups. However, Canwest convinced the Canadian Radio-Television and Telecommunications Commission (CRTC) that such twinstick operations would allow the company to support the "underserved" communities these stations were originally intended to serve, arguing that no other company could provide the same level of support (CJNT would not be sustainable financially, while the other stations would turn their focus to larger neighbouring markets such as Toronto or Vancouver). For instance, Canwest promised to relaunch CHCH as a station with a renewed focus on Hamilton. As a result, Canwest was able to maintain the B.C. and Alberta twinsticks, re-align CJNT with CKMI-TV, and most importantly secure a new twinstick in the major market of Toronto with both its own CIII-TV and WIC's CHCH.

=== The launch of CH ===
CH's first logo (2001-2005) shared the same crescent device as the logo Global used at the time

CH's second logo (2005-2007) retained the crescent device, but used a different colour scheme

In February 2001, CHCH dropped its "ONtv" branding, becoming the first to adopt the CH brand. It was followed by CHEK (newly disaffiliated from CTV) and multicultural station CJNT that September. The initial CH schedules largely consisted of the programming Canwest had inherited from WIC – indeed there were almost no programming changes initially at CHCH, since the branding change came mid-season. However, a handful of WIC programs would eventually be "cherry-picked" by Global. The stations also began to cross-promote heavily with the local Global stations. While CH briefly used the slogan "Closer to Home" when it launched, the letters "CH" were derived from the call sign of flagship CHCH. On the other hand, CJNT referred to the initials as Canal Horizon, or CH Horizon, until 2002.

CKRD joined in 2005 after disaffiliating from the CBC (having carried CH programming in non-CBC timeslots like it did during the WIC era prior to this), and reverted to its original call letters (CHCA) in the process. Kelowna's CHBC and Kamloops's CFJC, the latter owned by the Jim Pattison Group, also disaffiliated from the CBC in February 2006 and joined CH. Although CFJC was not owned by Canwest, its joint sales agreement with CHBC necessitated its affiliation switch. With a replacement brand for CH expected in the near future, both CHBC and CFJC maintained their own local identities for the remainder of the "CH" era.

=== Rebranding to E! ===
Published reports in early 2006 suggested that Canwest was looking to rebrand the CH stations. However, that brand remained in use for more than a year. In April 2007, Canwest finally announced that the CH stations would be relaunched as E! that fall; the changes took effect on September 7. E! (U.S.) owner Comcast licensed the brand name and programming, but it did not obtain ownership in the Canadian E! network.

The launch of E! in Canada marked the first adoption of a specialty channel-type schedule by an over-the-air system in Canada, essentially a loophole in a CRTC policy which permitted only one specialty channel per programming genre; this policy would be revoked in 2015. (Terrestrial stations have no restrictions on the genres of programming they can air, so long as they meet their Canadian content and local programming requirements.) Previously, E! programming had aired on Star!, which was launched in 1999 as the Canadian specialty channel with genre exclusivity for the entertainment / celebrity niche.

Pattison announced in September 2007 that its two remaining CBC affiliates, Prince George's CKPG-TV and Medicine Hat's CHAT-TV, would drop their current affiliation in favour of programming from Canwest effective fall 2008. CKPG affiliated with E! instead of Global due to the presence of a Global BC rebroadcaster in the market; CHAT joined E! as well, despite the absence of an over-the-air Global signal serving Medicine Hat.

=== Demise ===
Despite the rebranding and increased coverage, the system continued to trail in the ratings, and ultimately remained unprofitable. On February 5, 2009, amid rising debt and increasing pressure from creditors, Canwest announced it would explore "strategic options", including possible sale or closure, for its E! O&Os, saying "a second conventional TV network is no longer key to the long-term success" of the company. The company later announced it would sell two of those stations, CHCH and CJNT, to Channel Zero, which said it would operate both as independent stations.

Canwest also made clear that it would not be running the remaining E! stations as of fall 2009, and in late July announced the rebranding of CHBC, and the closure of CHCA and CHEK, all effective September 1. However, as discussed below, the CHEK decision was later reversed, with an agreement to sell the station to a local consortium.

The transition for each station on Monday, August 31, 2009, was as follows:

- Channel Zero took control of programming at CHCH as of midnight EDT Monday morning, and at CJNT as of 6:00 a.m. (although the latter station's new programming did not actually take air until mid-morning).
- CHCA ended regular programming by 4:00 a.m. MDT. At that point it began airing a slide thanking viewers for their support, before leaving the air on September 1.
- CHBC joined Global (by simulcasting CHAN-TV's morning news) at 5:30 a.m. PDT.
- CHEK was scheduled to carry regular programming until 7:00 p.m., when it was to air an hour-long look back at the best of their newsmagazine show, Island 30 and a two-hour retrospective of its 53 years covering local news, before signing off permanently at 10:00 p.m. However, by late afternoon on the 31st, negotiations to sell the station had resumed, delaying the station's signoff indefinitely; nevertheless, CHEK no longer carried E! programming as of September 1. An agreement to sell the station to an employee-led group (pending approval from the CRTC) was finalized on September 4, thereby allowing CHEK to remain on the air.
- Program schedules for the Pattison stations indicated that they would carry "regular" E! programming throughout the broadcast day, with the last Canwest-supplied program, The Late Late Show with Craig Ferguson, concluding at approximately 1:38 a.m. PDT on September 1; however, it is not clear whether all of the primetime and late-night programming actually made air, since, by that point, it was not scheduled to air on any Canwest station. The Pattison stations began carrying national Citytv programming later that morning.

The rights to most of the system's non-E! primetime programs were acquired by other broadcasters, with most going to Citytv. Meanwhile, Canwest had been believed to retain the Canadian rights to E! (U.S.)'s original programming under its original long-term contract with Comcast. These programs were expected to move to the company's other channels such as Global or Slice, the latter having carried some E! programs in the past, or potentially even a new or rebranded E! cable channel (provided such a channel did not interfere with Star!'s exclusivity in the celebrity/entertainment genre). However, no such move occurred.

The closure of E! did not put an end to Canwest's financial troubles, and the company filed for creditor protection towards the end of 2009. Its broadcasting assets, including CHBC and the other Global O&Os, were eventually auctioned off to Shaw Communications, and became part of the new Shaw Media unit in late 2010. Shaw Media was in turn, acquired by Corus Entertainment on April 1, 2016.

In fall 2010, CTVglobemedia (later renamed Bell Media after its purchase by BCE Inc.) reached a new deal with Comcast to move E! programming back to Star!, which was renamed E! on November 29, 2010. The circumstances under which Canwest/Shaw Media's contract with E! programming ended – that is, whether the deal had expired, or had been cancelled by one or both sides – were unclear.

=== Subsequent connections ===
Following their respective sales, CHCH and CHEK both began airing a line-up consisting primarily of rolling news during the daytime hours, and a featured movie each evening. While it was likely that some of the same movies were aired on both stations, there was no apparent coordination between the stations in terms of either news coverage or scheduling – that is, the two stations would not typically air the same movie on the same night.

From September 2010, CHCH and CHEK once again began to carry some of the same programming on the same date, having each acquired regional rights to various U.S. series, such as Smallville, Supernatural, Everybody Hates Chris, Chuck, Nightline, 20/20, 60 Minutes, Jimmy Kimmel Live!, 48 Hours Mystery, and selected NBA on ABC season and playoff games, most of which were shed by Sun TV as part of its transition to the Sun News Network. However, the stations retained their existing ownership and branding, and were expected to continue scheduling movies and selling advertising independently. As a result, this did not appear at the time to be a revival of the former CH/E! system.

CJNT withdrew from this partnership as of June 4, 2012, due to its sale by Channel Zero to Rogers Media, and an associated interim affiliation agreement for CJNT with Rogers' Citytv television system.

== Programming ==
E! aired a number of programs from the U.S. broadcast networks, sharing a library of programs with Global. Initially, it was not uncommon for Global, which was carried in more cities nationwide, to cherry-pick some of CH's hits and air them on the main network. Conversely, Global programs were sometimes sent "down" to CH if two programs aired by Global begin to air simultaneously on separate U.S. networks, so Canwest could maximize its simultaneous substitution opportunities. Following the start of E!, the practice was for the most part abandoned, although such series might be exchanged between the two systems from one season to the next.

Content from the American E! network started to air throughout the system's daytime, late night, and weekend schedule upon its re-branding on September 7, 2007; this was to include Canadian-produced series aired on E! channels internationally, although the extent of this was unclear. E! programming had previously aired on Star! until the launch of E! in Canada. As a result of this change, E! programming was not available in all areas where it could be seen previously, although E! stations were generally available on digital cable, as well as both of Canada's satellite providers. Primetime programming continued to be sourced primarily from the major U.S. broadcast networks.

As CH, local stations (except for CHBC and CFJC) used the "CH" brand throughout the day, titling their newscasts CH News as opposed to using their often well-known call signs. Similar network-based branding practices have been common at most local TV stations in Canada, including the O&Os of Canwest's primary Global network, since the late 1990s. Upon converting to E!, that brand became similarly predominant for most of the broadcast day.

For similar reasons, the E! branding was downplayed somewhat during sports programming such as PGA Tour coverage, when the system's bug was not seen. The bug was, however, used during some shows outside of the "entertainment" genre, such as lifestyle programming aired during the daytime schedule.

=== News ===
Local news coverage and other regional programming on the E! stations used the CH News brand. When CH became E!, it reverted to their local branding, such as "CHCH News" in Hamilton, and "CJNT Montreal" for multicultural programming on the Montreal station. Local branding was also used for most local community sponsorships. This decision was made at least partly to avoid confusion with the entertainment news show E! News, but it was likely also intended to ensure that local newscasts were not themselves perceived as celebrity-oriented.

Some E! stations also aired Global's national newscasts Global National though CHCH aired Live @ 5:30 talk show.

== E! HD ==
On April 18, 2008, E! launched a high-definition simulcast of its Ontario station (CHCH). The channel was available on digital cable in many areas, and also over-the-air in the Hamilton-Toronto-Buffalo area through CHCH's digital simulcast (and eventual permanent) channel. It was the only E! station to launch HD operations before the system's demise.

== E! stations ==
=== Owned-and-operated ===
After the system was re-branded as E!, each station began using local branding featuring its call sign during local programming time slots. Here is a typical example of an E! local station logo under this branding scheme, in this case CHCH. CHEK (until 2022) and the Pattison stations (CFJC, CKPG, and CHAT) continue to use a variant of this logo for news and general branding. However, all news and station ID graphics from the E! era have since been replaced.

Note:

1) Italicized channel numbers indicate a digital channel allocated for future use by the Canadian Radio-television and Telecommunications Commission.

City of license/market	Station	Channel TV (RF)	Year of affiliation	Year of disaffiliation	Notes
Victoria, British Columbia	CHEK-TV	6 (analog only)	2001	2009	originally scheduled to close down on August 31, 2009, but was instead sold to a consortium of station employees and local investors; currently carries infomercials, news, movies, and other local programming; since re-added American programming. Has since been a secondary affiliate of Yes TV.
Kelowna, British Columbia	CHBC-TV	2 (analog only)	2006	2009	Currently a Global O&O owned by Corus.
Red Deer, Alberta	CHCA-TV	6 (analog only)	2005	2009	closed August 31, 2009; license revoked December 16, 2009
Hamilton, Ontario	CHCH-TV	11.1 (then 18 now 11)	2001	2009	now owned by Channel Zero; initially carried a news/movies format; since re-added American programming and now identifies on-air as CHCH. The all-news format in the daytime was discontinued in December 2015 due to budget cuts.
Montreal, Quebec	CJNT-TV	62 (analog only)	2001	2009	now owned by Rogers Media in a conventional English-language format as Citytv Montreal. Previously owned by Channel Zero under its multicultural format as Metro 14 with addition of foreign movies and music videos as well as some American programming (The latter was carried over to CFHD upon that station's launch).

=== Affiliates and secondary carriers ===
E!'s three affiliates were all owned by the Jim Pattison Group as ex-CBC Television affiliates. They nevertheless also adopted the on-air news look of the Canwest E! stations. All three began carrying Citytv programming on September 1, 2009. Many Global stations in markets not served by E!, however, plus other stations not owned by Canwest, also broadcast programs usually seen on the E! system. Those stations include, former private CBC affiliates such as CHEX and CKWS, then CTV affiliate CJBN and the Thunder Bay Television twinstick of CKPR and CHFD as well as Lloydminster twinstick of CKSA and CITL.

City of license/market	Station	Analog channel	Year of affiliation	Year of disaffiliation	Owner
Kamloops, British Columbia	CFJC-TV	4	2006	2009	Jim Pattison Group
Medicine Hat, Alberta	CHAT-TV	6	2008	2009	Jim Pattison Group
Prince George, British Columbia	CKPG-TV	2	2008	2009	Jim Pattison Group

== Slogans ==
- As CH:
  - 2001: Closer to Home
  - 2001-2005: CH Has It All!
  - 2001-2007: Closer to You!
- As E!
  - 2007-2009: Everything Entertainment

== See also ==
- 2007 Canada broadcast TV realignment
