= Tara Nelson =

Canadian television journalist and news anchor

Tara Nelson is a Canadian television journalist and news anchor, and most recently was the European bureau chief for Global Television Network's news division. In 2010, Nelson assumed the role as the anchor of the News at 6 at CTV Calgary, replacing Barb Higgins, who left the position after joining the mayoral race in Calgary.

Nelson previously worked as a reporter and anchor for CITV-DT in Edmonton, CHEK-DT in Victoria and CHAN-DT in Vancouver before joining Global National as a reporter. From 2005 to 2008, she served as the program's weekend anchor and primary weekday substitute anchor.
