= Jackson Proskow =

Canadian journalist

- Born: 1982 (age 43–44); Calgary, Alberta, Canada
- Education: University of Calgary, SAIT Polytechnic
- Occupations: Journalist, television broadcaster

Jackson Proskow is a Canadian journalist with the Global Television Network. He is currently the network's Washington Bureau Chief, reporting for Global National, the network's flagship national news broadcast.

== Career ==
Proskow was born in Calgary, Alberta and began his career at Shaw TV at age 16. After attending the University of Calgary and SAIT Polytechnic, he was hired by Global Television as a videographer and anchor in Lethbridge, Alberta in June 2004. In September 2005 he joined CHCH-TV in Hamilton, Ontario. He joined Global Toronto in January 2006, before moving to Washington, D.C. in August 2014.

During his tenure as City Hall reporter for Global Toronto he covered the turmoil surrounding Mayor Rob Ford, and at an unscheduled press conference, asked the question that resulted in Ford's admission of crack cocaine use while mayor. During an investigation he uncovered major structural issues with Toronto's Gardiner Expressway that had gone unreported to municipal politicians. Proskow has covered major international stories including the Royal Wedding of Prince William and Kate Middleton, the Alberta floods of 2013 and President Barack Obama's inaugural visit to Canada.

Proskow's reporting has won numerous awards, including an Edward R. Murrow award for his investigation into safety issues with Toronto's Gardiner Expressway. He is married, and currently lives in Washington, D.C.
