= First National (TV series) =

Canadian television newscast

First National is a Canadian television newscast, which aired on the Global Television Network's stations in Ontario and Manitoba from 1994 to 2001. It was also seen in Quebec after Global launched there in 1997. The program's anchor was Peter Kent.

Although the newscast aired in only three provinces at most, its format was that of a national newscast, broadcasting national and international, rather than local news.

On February 9, 2001, following Global's acquisition of the WIC group of stations, First National aired its final broadcast. Global aired WIC's Canada Tonight in its place until Global National debuted on September 4. Kent then moved into a management role with the network; he later left broadcasting to pursue a career in Canadian politics.
