= Global National =

Canadian national television newscast

- Opening used since 2022
- Presented by: Weekdays (2001–2022); Monday to Thursday: Dawna Friesen (2010–present); Weekends (2005–2022); Friday to Sunday: Coleen Christie (2026-present)
- Country of origin: Canada
- Original languages: English; Mandarin (2012–2016)

Production
- Production locations: Burnaby, British Columbia (2001–2008, 2010–2022, 2026-present; Weekdays and Weekends, 2008–2010; Weekends, 2022–2026; Monday to Thursday); Toronto, Ontario (2022–2024; Friday to Sunday); Ottawa, Ontario (2008–2010; Weekdays)
- Running time: 30 minutes

Original release
- Network: Global
- Release: September 3, 2001 – present
- Network: Shaw Multicultural Channel
- Release: January 23, 2012 – June 30, 2016

Related
- First National; Canada Tonight

Global National is the English language flagship national newscast of Canada's Global Television Network. Editorial and production staff are based out of Global's national news centre at Global BC in Burnaby, British Columbia, with Dawna Friesen presenting from the Global BC studios Mondays to Thursdays, and Coleen Christie presenting Fridays to Sundays. From 2008 to 2010, the program was the only Canadian network newscast to be regularly anchored from the nation's capital, Ottawa.

In addition to Global's owned-and-operated stations (O&Os), Global National also airs on affiliate CHFD-DT in Thunder Bay, Ontario and independent station CJON-DT in St. John's, Newfoundland.

Global also produced a Mandarin version of the newscast, titled Global National Mandarin from 2012 to 2016. It was anchored by Carol Wang. The newscast was seen on Shaw Multicultural Channel in Vancouver, British Columbia and Calgary, Alberta.

== History ==
Global's first tentative steps towards a national news presence came in 1994 with the launch of First National, a regional newscast presented by Peter Kent which was aired in Manitoba, Ontario and (starting in 1997) Quebec. Around the same time, the rival WIC television station group launched Canada Tonight, a newscast produced at WIC's Vancouver station CHAN-TV (better known as British Columbia Television or BCTV), and also aired on its stations in Alberta and Ontario.

Following the purchase of WIC's television stations by Global's then-parent company Canwest, Global announced in January 2001 its plans to launch a new network newscast in September of that year, with Kevin Newman returning to Canada from ABC News as the newscast's chief anchor. First National ended production in February, and the Global stations which had aired that program broadcast Canada Tonight in its place until the new newscast launched.

The final broadcast of Canada Tonight aired on August 31, 2001, and the new newscast, titled Global National, debuted on September 3 from a renovated studio at CHAN, which became a Global O&O two days earlier and produces its local newscasts from the same studio. As part of the deal in which Global bought CHAN, it became home to Global's national news centre; the station had wanted to do a national newscast for its former network CTV (with Canada Tonight emerging as the result after CTV's board turned CHAN's proposal down). When the program began, it had only 15 people on staff and a budget of $8 million; the newscast was tied in part to $20 million worth of funding Global had put aside, in exchange for the CRTC to give Global a national network license (a bid approved in January 2000); Global National, as well as public-affairs shows and "wellness documentaries" were the fruits of the deal.

Global National set several technological firsts; it was the first daily newscast in the world to use digital cameras in addition to videotape, as well as editing all stories on Apple's then-new Final Cut editing software. The look and feel of the newscast was also distinctively different in comparison to other national newscasts; eschewing common elements like maps and globes, instead swirling circles in the Global house colors of red (with burgundy and orange, known internally as the "vortex of news") were used with a circular logo integrating the Global "crescent" logo of the era; the music package was uniquely heavy on woodwinds, drums and flutes. The newscast name was originally Global Network News (or GNN), but Global's marketing department argued for a title that was shorter and more concise.

Kevin Newman's name was added to the program's title from the start of its second season. The program initially only aired on weekdays; weekend broadcasts began on February 26, 2005, with Tara Nelson as the anchor. The launch of the weekend editions precipitated the cancellation of the newsmagazine series Global Sunday.

Global National initially aired in different time slots across the country: 5:30 pm in British Columbia; 6:00 in Saskatchewan and Manitoba; 6:30 pm in Alberta, Ontario and Quebec; and 11:15 pm in the Maritimes. In conjunction with the launch of Global's new visual identity in February 2006, the program began to be aired live at 6:30 pm in the Atlantic Time Zone, and 5:30 elsewhere. This version of the program is then broadcast via satellite tape delay in time zones to the west (at 6:30 Eastern, 5:30 Central, Mountain, and Pacific, and 6:00 on CHBC Kelowna since 2009), with updates if news events warrant. This allows the newscast to air at a uniform time slot across most of the country, as well as to serve as a lead-in to local news in most markets. While strong in Western Canada from day one – particularly in British Columbia, where CHAN has dominated news ratings for four decades – the timeslot change allowed the program's ratings in Ontario to improve significantly as a result of having The Young and the Restless as its lead-in; that show had previously given a strong ratings bump to CIII's local newscast. (On October 11, 2011, CIII moved Global National back to 6:30 p.m. as part of a scheduling shift with its early evening newscast, the News Hour.)

Past opening title cards

Opening used from February 2006 – September 2010.

Opening used from 2013–2022.

It is often difficult to compare Canada's national newscast ratings because the newscasts air at different times. Global decided to cut into their supper hour local newscast ratings to air Global National while rivals CTV and CBC air their national newscasts in the late evening. Despite airing in a more favorable timeslot, Global National is continually out-rated by CTV National News and maintains a slight lead over CBC's The National.

In February 2008, Newman began presenting the weekday edition of Global National from a specially-built digital newsroom and studio facility in Ottawa. The Ottawa studio's cameras were controlled remotely from CHAN in Vancouver, where the newscast's main editorial and production staff remain. Similar remote-controlled greenscreen studios were introduced at a number of local Global newscasts.

Tara Nelson was named Global's Europe bureau chief in September 2008; her position as the program's weekend anchor was then shared by Carolyn Jarvis on Saturdays and Robin Gill on Sundays. Nelson resigned in October 2010 to become the new 6:00 pm anchor at CTV Calgary, Alberta (CFCN-DT).

Newman announced his departure from the network on April 30, 2010, and anchored the newscast for the last time on August 20, 2010. Dawna Friesen was named as his successor on July 13, 2010, and began anchoring Global National on September 20, 2010.

Carolyn Jarvis was reassigned to Global's newsmagazine program 16:9 in 2011, with Robin Gill taking over as Saturday anchor alongside her pre-existing Sunday hosting duties.

== Global National Mandarin ==
Global National Mandarin was a newscast aired on the Shaw Multicultural Channel in Vancouver and Calgary. On December 6, 2011, Global announced its plans to launch Global National Mandarin (Global National 国语新闻). The 30-minute Mandarin newscast debuted on January 23, 2012, with Carol Wang as anchor. It was announced on June 29, 2016, that Global National Mandarin would air its final broadcast on June 30 as it did not garner the viewership necessary to continue airing. The investigative documentary series 16x9 was also cancelled at this time.

== Notable on-air staff ==
=== Anchors ===
- Dawna Friesen - anchor and executive editor (Monday-Thursday)
- Coleen Christie (Friday-Sunday)

=== Correspondents ===
- Eric Sorensen - Senior National Affairs Correspondent
- Jeff Semple - Global News Senior National Correspondent
- Jackson Proskow - Washington Bureau Chief
- Reggie Cecchini - Washington Correspondent
- Jennifer Johnson - Washington Correspondent
- David Akin - Chief Political Correspondent (Ottawa)
- Mercedes Stephenson - Ottawa Bureau Chief
- Redmond Shannon - London Correspondent
- Mike Armstrong - Quebec Correspondent
- Neetu Garcha - BC Correspondent
- Heather Yourex-West - Alberta Correspondent
- Heidi Petracek - Atlantic Correspondent

=== Substitute anchors ===
Substitute anchors have included:

- Chris Gailus (Global BC)
- Neetu Garcha (Global BC)
- Eric Sorenson - Senior National Affairs Correspondent
- Sophie Lui (Global BC)
- David Akin - Chief Political Correspondent

=== Former on-air staff ===
- Patrick Brown: briefly Global's Beijing Bureau, returned to CBC Television as an independent correspondent
- Crystal Goomansingh - London Bureau Chief, now a reporter with CBC London bureau
- Carolyn Jarvis: now with CTV News Channel (was host of 16x9 until it was cancelled in 2016)
- Kevin Newman (anchor/executive editor, 2001–2010): formerly host of Kevin Newman Live on CTV News Channel and CTV's Question Period
- Tara Nelson (weekend anchor, 2005–2008; Europe bureau chief, 2008–2010): now 6:00 pm anchor at CFCN-DT Calgary, Alberta
- Sean Mallen: former Europe Bureau Chief (based in London), later reporter for Global Toronto, Now a communications consultant.
- Leslie Roberts: resigned 2015
- Carol Wang: Weeknights (Mandarin anchor, 2012–2016) Shaw Multicultural Channel
- Vassy Kapelos: The West Block (Anchor, 2017–2018), now the host of CBC's Power and Politics
- Shirlee Engel: formerly the “National Affairs Correspondent”| now with Compass Rose
- Robin Gill - (anchor/primary substitute anchor, 2008–2021): British Columbia correspondent (based in Vancouver)
- Gord Steinke (Global Edmonton)
- Ross Lord: formerly Atlantic Correspondent
- Sonia Deol (Global BC)
- Farah Nasser - weekend/substitute anchor (Friday-Sunday)

=== Former Reporters ===
- Jas Johal
- Mike Edgel

== See also ==
- Global News
