= Robin Gill (journalist) =

Canadian journalist

Robin Gill (born May 12, 1978) is a Canadian journalist who was the weekend anchor for Global National and B.C. correspondent from 2008 to 2021. She has also worked for the Canadian Broadcasting Corporation (CBC) and graduated from the University of British Columbia with a degree in International Relations and from BCIT she earned a diploma in broadcast journalism.

Gill began her career as a writer and researcher for CHAN-TV. Her next position required her to move to Saskatchewan for a job reporting and anchoring for CTV Yorkton. From Saskatchewan she then began reporting for the CBC in Vancouver. She helped launch A-Channel, a new station in Calgary (now Citytv), where she hosted both the morning show and reported for the evening news. She then moved to Toronto in the summer of 2000, to report for Global News in Toronto (CIII-TV) before becoming the weekend anchor.

Since moving to Toronto, Gill has worked on many stories highlighting local issues, including the SARS outbreak, the 2003 and 2007 provincial elections, the Blackout of 2003, and the Dalai Lama's visit. She was also active in reporting on the 2005 "Year of the Gun" story for Global News, and hosted and reported on community events in affected areas which were aimed at reducing gun violence in troubled Toronto neighbourhoods.

In December 2008, Gill joined Global National as the new weekend anchor. Gill anchored her final Global National broadcast on December 19, 2021.
