= CFCN-DT =

Television station in Calgary

- Calgary, Alberta; Canada
- Channels: Digital: 29 (UHF); Virtual: 4
- Branding: CTV Calgary (general); CTV News Calgary (newscasts)

Programming
- Affiliations: 4.1: CTV

Ownership
- Owner: Bell Media Inc.
- Sister stations: CFRN-DT, CTV 2 Alberta, CKMX, CIBK-FM, CJAY-FM

History
- First air date: September 9, 1960
- Former call signs: CFCN-TV (1960–2011)
- Former channel numbers: Analogue: 4 (VHF, 1960–2011); Digital: 36 (UHF, 2009–2011)
- Former affiliations: Independent (1960–1961)
- Call sign meaning: "Calgary's First Choice for News" (unofficial)

Technical information
- Licensing authority: CRTC
- ERP: 220 kW
- HAAT: 206.1 m (676 ft)
- Transmitter coordinates: 51°3′34″N 114°10′13″W
- Translator(s): see § Transmitters

Links
- Website: CTV Calgary

CFCN-DT (channel 4, cable channel 3) is a television station in Calgary, Alberta, Canada, owned and operated by the CTV Television Network, a division of Bell Media. It is sister to cable-exclusive CTV 2 Alberta (based in Edmonton with CFRN-DT). CFCN-DT's studios are located on Patina Rise Southwest, near Calgary's Coach Hill neighbourhood, and its transmitter is located near Old Banff Coach Road/Highway 563.

== History ==
CFCN first signed on the air on September 9, 1960; owned by the Love family, along with CFCN-AM (1060 kHz, now CKMX). It was the first independent television station in Canada. It became a charter member of the Canadian Television Network, now CTV, on October 8, 1961. Canadian General Electric built a 173-foot (53 m) antenna for CFCN-TV, the largest of its type built at the time by the company. The antenna was shipped to Calgary in four sections and was erected in stages atop the station's 344-foot (105 m) tower, for a total height of 517 feet (158 m) making it the tallest structure in the city of Calgary until 1968 when the Calgary Tower was completed. The antenna was high gain, ultra power, slot type. Power output would be 100,000 watts video. A 5 kW General Electric modular transmitter would be used. Complete studio facilities were also from Canadian General Electric, including an EMI 4/12" orthicon camera.

In 1967, Maclean-Hunter bought the CFCN stations. In 1968, CFCN's semi-satellite in Lethbridge began operation, leasing tower space for its transmitter from CJLH-TV (channel 7, now CISA-DT).

CFCN-TV logo as it appeared in 1975. It was used until 1991.

One of CFCN's locally produced shows, The Buck Shot Show, began in 1967. For the next 30 years, host Ron Barge was a comforting and familiar figure to Calgary children. Every noon hour, he appeared on television wearing a battered cowboy hat and shirt alongside his sidekicks, Benny the Bear and Clyde the Owl. Three generations of kids grew up with Buck Shot, Benny the Bear and Clyde the Owl. Local police officers, firefighters and paramedics visited the show and taught kids how to be safe. A humorous song that was popular on the show was "16 Chickens and Tambourine" by Roy Acuff. His birthday wishes to local children with their name on the screen was the highlight of many children in the 1970s and 1980s.

When cable companies opened in Calgary, the station was carried on channel 5; from 1991 to 1994, the station's logo and branding referenced this. In late 1994, anticipating that a new Calgary television station might be assigned to broadcast on channel 5 (which would be CKAL-DT in 1997), CFCN switched to cable channel 3, and the logo was changed accordingly. Maclean-Hunter merged with Rogers Communications in 1994. Rogers sold CFCN to Baton Broadcasting in 1996. CFCN was the next-to-last major acquisition for Baton before it bought majority control of CTV in 1997. CFCN abandoned its "Channel 3" logo and slogan in September 1998 and was replaced by its bold yellow-letter logo until 2005, when it adopted its current "CTV Calgary" branding.

On November 25, 2005, CFCN-TV-5 Lethbridge was given approval to make some technical changes to CFCN-TV-8 at Medicine Hat. Effective radiated power would be reduced from 6,700 watts to an average ERP of 5,800 watts, the antenna height would be raised and the transmitter site would change.

On October 18, 2016, a semi-truck collided at the transmitter facility of sister station CFRN in Edmonton. The building was partially evacuated, including the news control room, after fears the broadcast tower may collapse due to a damaged guy-wire cable. Programming on CFCN, including the evening newscasts, were simulcast on CFRN.

== Programming ==
CFCN airs the full CTV program lineup on a Mountain Time schedule. However, some programs are broadcast three hours after CTV's Toronto flagship CFTO-DT (effectively, one hour later in Mountain Time than CFTO in Eastern Time). This matches the Pacific Time Zone scheduling of U.S. network affiliates from Spokane, Washington available on many Alberta cable systems and thus allows simultaneous substitution of CFCN over the American broadcasts.

=== News operation ===
CFCN presently broadcasts 37 hours of locally produced newscasts each week (with seven hours each weekday and one hour each on Saturdays and Sundays); in regards to the number of hours devoted to news programming, it has the second highest local newscast output out of any English-language television station in the Calgary market, behind Global Calgary. It also broadcasts a separate 30-minute newscast at 5 p.m. on weekdays for viewers in Lethbridge and Southern Alberta, available only on the over-the-air transmitters or through cable companies that distribute CFCN-DT-5 Lethbridge.

During the 1970s, former (then future) Alberta premier Ralph Klein was a reporter for CFCN before going into politics and heading north to Edmonton. The station debuted a locally produced morning show, CTV Morning Live, on October 24, 2011; the newscast replaced the CTV network's national morning show, Canada AM (which by that point, was seen only on CTV's Eastern Canada stations).

On July 22, 2010, anchor Barb Higgins announced that she would be leaving CFCN after 21 years anchoring the 6 p.m. newscast, to concentrate on the election for mayor of Calgary. On October 12, 2010, it was announced that Global National's Tara Nelson will be her replacement. Higgins' co-anchor, Darrel Janz, will leave the anchor desk on weekdays, after 37 years at that position and become a reporter for CFCN, making Nelson the sole-anchor for the 6 p.m. newscast; Janz will continue to anchor the Weekend 6 p.m. newscasts. That same week, weekend 6 p.m. anchor Tara Robinson left the station.

==== Notable current on–air staff ====
- Tara Nelson – weeknights

==== Notable former on-air staff ====
- Barb Higgins

== Technical information ==
=== Subchannel ===
Subchannel of CFCN-DT
Channel	Res.	Short name	Programming
4.1	1080i	CFCN-DT	CTV

=== Analogue-to-digital conversion ===
CFCN signed on its digital signal on January 8, 2009. CFCN shut down its analogue signal, over VHF channel 4, on August 31, 2011, the official date on which Canadian television stations in CRTC-designated mandatory markets transitioned from analogue to digital broadcasts. The station's digital signal moved from pre-transition UHF channel 36 to UHF channel 29 for post-transition operations. Digital television receivers display CFCN-DT's virtual channel as 4.

CFCN-DT-5 Lethbridge flash cut its digital signal on the air on August 31, 2011, at 12:04 a.m. immediately after the station's newscasts; digital television receivers there display CFCN-DT-5's virtual channel as 13.

=== Transmitters ===
Station	City of licence	Channel	ERP	HAAT	Transmitter coordinates
CFCN-DT-2	Banff	7.1 (VHF)	0.009 kW	NA	51°11′53″N 115°36′47″W
CFCN-DT-5	Lethbridge	13.1 (VHF)	139 kW	171.9 m (564 ft)	49°43′59″N 112°57′40″W
CFCN-TV-7^{1}	Bassano	6 (VHF)	0.01 kW	NA	50°47′18″N 112°28′58″W
CFCN-DT-13^{1}	Pigeon Mountain	15.1 (UHF)	0.005 kW	NA	51°2′4″N 115°12′34″W
CFCN-DT-14	Canmore	26.1 (UHF)	0.035 kW	NA	51°7′50″N 115°23′10″W

==== Former transmitters ====
Station	City of licence	Channel	ERP	HAAT	Transmitter coordinates
CFCN-TV-1	Drumheller (Delia)	12 (VHF)	80 kW	326.5 m (1,071 ft)	51°33′46″N 112°19′48″W
CFCN-TV-3	Brooks	9 (VHF)	0.008 kW	NA	50°32′3″N 111°55′0″W
CFCN-TV-4^{1}	Burmis	5 (VHF)	0.382 kW	133.8 m (439 ft)	49°31′54″N 114°11′41″W
CFCN-TV-6^{1}	Drumheller (city grade)	10 (VHF)	0.009 kW	NA	51°25′30″N 112°42′34″W
CFCN-TV-8	Medicine Hat	8 (VHF)	24.6 kW	141.3 m (464 ft)	50°9′45″N 110°57′23″W
CFCN-TV-9	Cranbrook, BC	5 (VHF)	0.446 kW	1,040 m (3,412 ft)	49°27′30″N 115°37′49″W
CFCN-TV-10	Fernie, BC	3 (VHF)	0.008 kW	NA	49°30′25″N 115°4′3″W
CFCN-TV-11^{1}	Sparwood, BC	6 (VHF)	0.008 kW	NA	49°42′18″N 114°51′50″W
CFCN-TV-12^{1}	Moyie, BC	8 (VHF)	0.005 kW	NA	49°24′45″N 115°50′19″W
CFCN-TV-15^{1}	Mount Goldie, BC	6 (VHF)	0.001 kW	NA	50°25′35″N 116°6′26″W
CFCN-TV-16^{1}	Oyen	2 (VHF)	0.71 kW	111.3 m (365 ft)	51°21′10″N 110°24′33″W
CFCN-TV-17^{1}	Waterton Park	6 (VHF)	0.001 kW	NA	49°3′31″N 113°54′42″W
CFCN-TV-18^{1}	Coleman	8 (VHF)	0.009 kW	NA	49°36′42″N 114°24′52″W
CFWL-TV-1	Invermere, BC	8 (VHF)	0.01 kW	NA	50°29′17″N 115°57′10″W

^{1}These and a long list of CTV rebroadcasters nationwide were to shut down on or before August 31, 2009, as part of a political dispute with Canadian authorities on paid fee-for-carriage requirements for cable television operators. A subsequent change in ownership assigned full control of CTVglobemedia to Bell Canada Enterprises; as of 2011, these transmitters remain in normal licensed broadcast operation. The list also indicated that CFCN-TV-7 Bassano would also shut down; however this transmitter is in fact operated by the Bassano TV Association, so it is not clear whether this transmitter would have closed down.

On February 11, 2016, Bell Media applied for its regular license renewals, which included applications to delete a long list of transmitters, including CFCN-TV-1, CFCN-TV-3, CFCN-TV-4, CFCN-TV-6, CFCN-TV-11, CFCN-TV-12, CFCN-TV-16, CFCN-TV-17, CFCN-TV-18 and CFWL-TV-1. Bell Media's rationale for deleting these analog repeaters is below:

"We are electing to delete these analog transmitters from the main licence with which they are associated. These analog transmitters generate no incremental revenue, attract little to no viewership given the growth of BDU or DTH subscriptions and are costly to maintain, repair or replace. In addition, none of the highlighted transmitters offer any programming that differs from the main channels. The Commission has determined that broadcasters may elect to shut down transmitters but will lose certain regulatory privileges (distribution on the basic service, the ability to request simultaneous substitution) as noted in Broadcasting Regulatory Policy CRTC 2015–24, Over-the-air transmission of television signals and local programming. We are fully aware of the loss of these regulatory privileges as a result of any transmitter shutdown."

At the same time, Bell Media applied to convert the licenses of CTV 2 Atlantic (formerly ASN) and CTV 2 Alberta (formerly ACCESS) from satellite-to-cable undertakings into television stations without transmitters (similar to cable-only network affiliates in the United States), and to reduce the level of educational content on CTV 2 Alberta.

On July 30, 2019, Bell Media was granted permission to close down three additional transmitters as part of Broadcasting Decision CRTC 2019-268. The transmitters for CFCN-TV-9, CFCN-TV-10, and CFCN-TV-15 were shut down on February 26, 2021, as outlined in the CRTC decision.

On February 26, 2021, Bell Media flash cut the Banff, Canmore and Pigeon Mountain transmitters to digital.

== See also ==
- The Buck Shot Show
