= CHEK-DT =

Television station in Victoria, British Columbia

- Victoria, British Columbia; Canada
- Channels: Digital: 16 (UHF); Virtual: 6
- Branding: CHEK

Programming
- Affiliations: Independent; Yes TV (secondary)

Ownership
- Owner: CHEK Media Group; (0859291 B.C. Ltd.)

History
- First air date: December 1, 1956
- Former call signs: CKTV-TV (prior to launch); CHEK-TV (1956–2011)
- Former channel numbers: Analogue: 6 (VHF, 1956–2011); Digital: 49 (UHF, 2011–2020)
- Former affiliations: CBC (1956–1981); CTV (secondary 1963–1981, primary 1981–2001); CH / E! (2001–2009)
- Call sign meaning: Sounds like "check"

Technical information
- Licensing authority: CRTC
- ERP: 16.4 kW
- HAAT: 482.4 m (1,583 ft)
- Transmitter coordinates: 48°46′28″N 123°10′16″W
- Translator(s): see § Transmitter

Links
- Website: www.cheknews.ca

CHEK-DT (channel 6) is an independent television station in Victoria, British Columbia, Canada, serving Vancouver Island and Greater Vancouver. The station is owned by the CHEK Media Group, a consortium made up of station employees and local investors. CHEK-DT's studios are located on Kings Road in Victoria, and its transmitter is located atop Mount Warburton Pike on Saturna Island.

== History ==
=== CBC and CTV affiliation ===
CHEK's first logo, used from 1956 to 1960

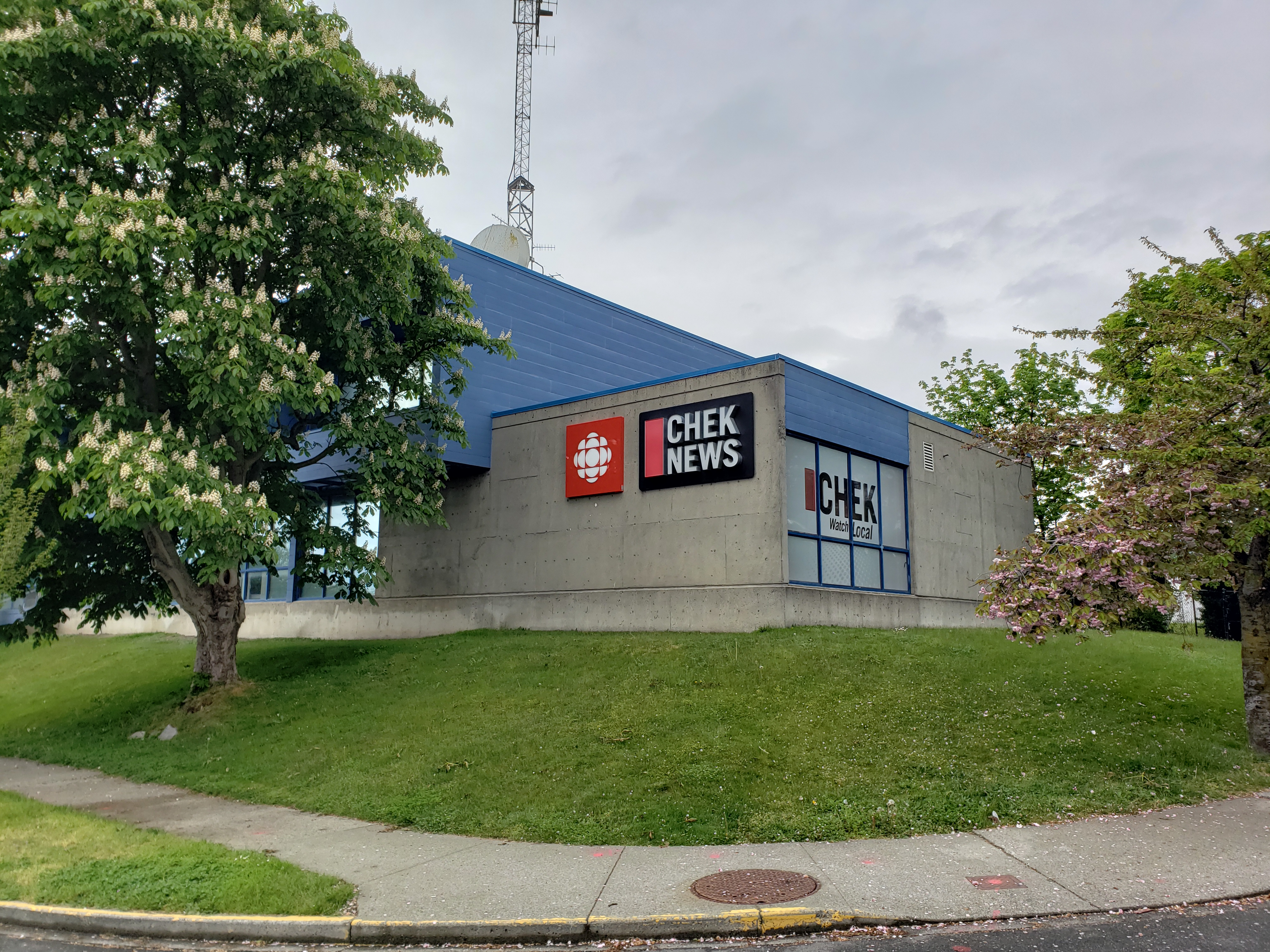
CHEK-DT studios at 780 Kings Road in Victoria since 1984

The station first signed on the air on December 1, 1956. Originally operating as a CBC affiliate, it was founded by David Armstrong, owner of local radio station CKDA (1220 AM, now CJZN-FM on 91.3); Armstrong originally applied to assign the CKTV call letters for the station, which was changed to CHEK-TV prior to the station's sign-on. Its original studio facilities were located on Epsom Drive in Saanich. Initially, the radio and television stations shared staff such as Andy Steven (who was CHEK's first news director) and Keith MacKenzie (who served as its sports director). CHEK was the only local television station that operated on Vancouver Island for many years, until CHUM Limited signed on CIVI-TV (channel 53) in October 2001. The station was the first (and is currently the oldest) privately owned television station in British Columbia. Only CBC owned-and-operated station CBUT-DT (channel 2) in Vancouver has been on the air longer, having signed on in December 1953.

CHEK logo used from early 1960s to 1963; it is the first known usage of a "check mark" first era as the station's logo.

CHAN-TV and CHEK-TV shared this logo in the 1960s; it was often used when the two stations simulcasted programming.

In 1963, the station was purchased by businessman Frank Griffiths, who also owned Vancouver CTV affiliate CHAN-TV (channel 8, now a Global owned-and-operated station). By September of that year, CHEK's schedule consisted of some CTV programming and simulcasts of CHAN-originated shows mixed in with the CBC network schedule, along with CHEK-based local productions and syndicated programs not aired on CHAN; this setup continued into the late 1960s and early 1970s, when CHAN started to timeshift network programs. CHEK would also air CBC programs during the afternoon and primetime while running CTV shows such as University of the Air and Canada AM in the morning (simulcast with CHAN).

In 1972, CHEK, which had simulcast CHAN's News Hour since the Griffiths purchase (and would continue to do so until 2001), began producing its own news program, News Hour Vancouver Island. It aired at 5:30 p.m. before the CHAN News Hour simulcast (in some cases, CHAN's News Hour would only be broadcast on CHEK due to other programming commitments, primarily Vancouver Canucks hockey), and at 11:15 p.m. following CBC's The National. From 1975 to 1976 and again from 1983 to 1986, CHEK used the same Pacific dogwood logo as CHAN; in both cases, they later reverted to using their own logo.

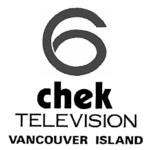
CHEK logo used from 1976 to 1978.

Beginning around the 1978–79 television season, CHEK gradually added more CTV programs during the prime time hours (which were timeshifted from their airings on CHAN). On January 5, 1981, when CBUT launched repeater stations in Sooke and Mount Macdonald, CHEK disaffiliated from CBC and became a full-time CTV station.

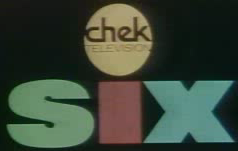
Logo from 1978 to 1980. A variant of BCTV's dogwood logo was used in the early 70s and early 80s.

In 1982, Western International Communications (WIC) acquired a 59% interest in CHEK and CHAN. WIC bought the remaining 41% interest from Selkirk Communications in 1989, when that company sold most of its broadcasting assets. In 1984, CHEK moved its operations from its original studios in Saanich to its present location at 780 Kings Road; the studio facility had originally been built to house a planned CBC Television station for Victoria, but budget cuts caused the plans to be shelved and then canceled.

CHEK logo used from 1992 to Summer 1997, meant to resemble a checkerboard.

CHEK logo used from 1986 to 1992.

Until 2001, CHEK also broadcast many of the same programs as CHAN on a timeshifted basis; as with CHAN, this consisted of a mixture of CTV network programming and WIC-owned programming (usually drawn from the schedule of CHCH in Hamilton), although the WIC programming usually differed from that aired on CHAN. The launch of Baton Broadcasting-owned CIVT (channel 32) in 1997 further complicated the distribution of CTV network programming in southwestern British Columbia, with CIVT becoming the area's third station (after CHAN and CHEK) to carry CTV programming. However, after CHAN strengthened its own morning newscast around 2000, CHEK became the only station in the province that aired Canada AM, as CIVT aired its own local morning news program.

=== Canwest takes ownership ===
Last CHEK logo before becoming part of CH, used from Summer 1997 to August 31, 2001 (and the second logo to use a "check mark" motif). For logos used as CH and E!, see E! (Canada).

CHEK came under the ownership of Canwest Global Communications in 2000 after that company acquired Western International Communications. This acquisition set off a major affiliation switch among the Vancouver–Victoria market's television stations in 2001, with both CHEK and CHAN disaffiliating from CTV, and CIVT becoming the sole CTV station in British Columbia. CHAN and CHEK's affiliation agreements with CTV were originally due to end in 2000; they were extended to expire on September 1, 2001, in view of the uncertainty surrounding the local media landscape.

After disaffiliating from CTV, CHEK became part of Canwest's new CH system. It rebranded as "CH Vancouver Island", and took on a schedule similar to that of Hamilton sister CHCH. CHEK aired 15 to 20 hours of local news programming each week, and often programs that were usually shown on CHAN were moved to accommodate its news programming. It also took the sports highlight and discussion program Sports Page from former Global owned-and-operated station CKVU (channel 10); however, CHAN continued to produce the program until its cancellation in September 2005.

The logo used for newscasts since 2007. It was the de facto branding of the station from 2007 to 2009.

CHEK celebrated its 50th anniversary in 2006; as part of the celebration, it aired vignettes of past station promos from the pre-CH era during commercial breaks. Another short vignette was also introduced consisting of CHEK's logos and station IDs through the years, from its original logo in 1956 to its then-current logo as "CH Vancouver Island".

On September 7, 2007, the station's newscasts were retitled CHEK News, a partial reversal of the current trend for Canadian television networks and systems to solely use their branding for their owned-and-operated stations, as a result of the rebranding of CH to E!. Programming on CHEK outside local newscasts were branded simply as "E!".

The logo used from 2012 to 2022.

On January 3, 2009, CHEK began simulcasting CHAN's broadcast of Global National at 5:30 p.m., the first time that CHEK had simulcast its former sister station's programming since the September 2001 affiliation switch.

=== Threatened closure; ownership by CHEK Media Group ===
On February 5, 2009, Canwest announced it would explore "strategic options", including a possible sale of the stations, for CHEK and its other E! owned-and-operated stations, on the basis that "a second conventional TV network [was] no longer key to the long-term success" of the company.

On July 22, 2009, after failing to find a buyer, Canwest announced it would be shutting down CHEK on August 31, 2009, issuing layoff notices to the station's staff. This would have resulted in CIVI-TV becoming the only remaining television station to serve the Victoria area. Shortly after the announcement was made, CHEK employees announced a proposal to acquire a 25% interest in the station and find local investors to acquire the remaining 75%, and organized a campaign to support the plan and save channel 6. On August 27, 2009, station employees announced that they had raised $2.5 million for the buyout plan; however, the following day, Canwest announced that the employee buyout did not meet company guidelines to keep the station on the air, and that the station had no programming and advertising lined up beyond August 31, at which date Canwest would permanently shut down the station. CHEK would have closed down following the late newscast that night, after a retrospective on the station's history.

However, on August 31, 2009, during its 5 p.m. newscast, the station announced that its shutdown would be put on hold, and that it would continue broadcasting while negotiations between Canwest and the prospective new owners continued. Facing a new deadline of September 4, Canwest announced on that date that it had reached a deal to sell the station to CHEK's employees and several local investors, through a consortium known as CHEK Media Group, for $2. Canwest would continue to provide transitional support for CHEK, including providing certain programming, allowing the use of its Vancouver studios, and leasing, at "favourable rates," the 780 Kings Road studios to the new owners with the assumption of various station liabilities. The sale was approved by the Canadian Radio-television and Telecommunications Commission (CRTC) on November 9. After the sale's announcement, station manager John Pollard revealed to CBC News that CHEK would operate as an independent station (one of two such stations in Canada that began as a CBC Television affiliate, and then later a CTV affiliate, alongside CJON-DT in St. John's, Newfoundland and Labrador), with no plans to simulcast any American programs.

CHEK Media Group took control of the station's programming on that date the station also disaffiliated from E! (which shut down a few days prior), and adopted a new schedule that included a mix of movies and older programming (both Canadian and American in origin), syndicated programming and a greater emphasis on local newscasts (including a new 10 p.m. newscast that debuted on September 1), and reverted to branding itself as simply "CHEK".

The station later reversed its stance on running recent American programs; in September 2010, CHEK, for the first time since it came under the employee/investor control, began airing American network television series. Many of the programs that were added to the schedule (including Smallville, Supernatural, Jimmy Kimmel Live!, Chuck and 60 Minutes) were previously carried in the Vancouver–Victoria market on CHNU-DT (channel 66) and on cable through Toronto/Hamilton independent station CKXT-TV (that station's owner, Quebecor, was in the process of replacing that station's licence with one for an all-news cable channel; Quebecor shut down the station and relinquished the CKXT license to the CRTC in 2011). The station also acquired I Hate Hollywood, produced by CHCH-DT, which picked up all of the mentioned programs.

On January 25, 2013, CHEK began sharing space with the local CBC Radio One station CBCV-FM, which migrated its operations into the television station's Kings Road studios.

== Programming ==
As an independent station, CHEK's programming features a mix of newscasts and other locally produced programs, syndicated programming, movies and infomercials. Some entertainment programming is aired through its secondary affiliation with indieNET (formerly Net5).

=== Past local programming ===
The following is a partial list of local programs that formerly aired on CHEK:

- Sports Page (sports highlights – produced at CHAN-TV)
- Vancouver Canucks hockey (sports)
- Vancouver Grizzlies basketball (sports)

=== Notable past foreign programming ===
- From August 1995 to August 1999, CHEK carried the Late Show with David Letterman at 4:30 on weekday afternoons. Other channels that have carried the talk show, including originating U.S. network CBS, have aired the program in the late evening (11:35 p.m. ET/PT).
- From 1995 to 2001 The Bold and the Beautiful weekdays on CTV.

=== News operation ===
CHEK-DT presently broadcasts 14 1/2 hours of locally produced newscasts each week (with 2 1/2 hours each weekday and an hour each on Saturdays and Sundays); in addition, the station also produces news updates between entertainment programs at the top of each hour between 1 and 3:30 p.m. each weekday. Unlike most news-producing television stations in major Canadian markets, the station does not broadcast a late evening newscast on weekends (its only weekend newscast is a one-hour 5 p.m. newscast). In addition, the station produces the half-hour public affairs program CHEK Point. CHEK uses shoots on DVC-Pro tapes for all its programming and pre-recorded segments during its newscasts.

Longtime news anchor Hudson Mack left CHEK in 2004, after 19 years at the station, following his appointment as news director at CIVI effective September 1 (Mack later became anchor of that station's 5 p.m. newscast the following month on October 11). To replace Mack, Sophie Lui returned to the station from CHAN-TV and was paired with former CIVT Victoria bureau chief Ed Watson as the station's main anchors. On August 25, 2008, production for CHEK's newscasts migrated from Victoria to CHAN's facility in Burnaby with the addition of a new virtual set, and a launch of a new newscast, CHEK News: Island 30 – which focused on news stories outside Victoria. The program was retooled months later into a newsmagazine and renamed to simply Island 30. Longtime CHAN anchor Tony Parsons joined CHEK on March 15, 2010, as anchor of CHEK's 10 p.m. newscast; Parsons had earlier stepped down as anchor at CHAN after a 35-year run as anchor of its News Hour supper hour broadcast on December 16, 2009.

In April 2010, CHEK entered into a news share agreement with the CBC, in which the station and CBC Television's Vancouver O&O CBUT would share news content, staff and resources. Parsons also joined the CBC to anchor CBUT's 90-minute early evening newscast, CBC News: Vancouver, resulting in him flying to Victoria after that program to anchor CHEK's 10 p.m. newscast. A simulcast of the 6 p.m. half-hour of CBC News: Vancouver was also added to CHEK's schedule on that date. On June 15, 2012, Parsons relinquished his duties on the 10 p.m., while remaining lead anchor of the 6 p.m. half-hour of the CBUT newscast; a rotation of anchors and reporters temporarily replaced Parsons as 10 p.m. anchor.

Long time reporter Stacy Ross was named anchor of CHEK News at 5:00 and 6:30, after the resignation of Jim Beatty. In October 2015, former CTV and Global News International correspondent Ben O'Hara-Byrne joined the station, as they launched CHEK News at 6, which O'Hara-Byrne was hired to anchor the 6 and 10 p.m. news.

In 2018, former prime time CHEK anchor Scott Fee returned to the company as News Director. Fee set out to renew and restructure CHEK News. In his first year, Fee oversaw the design and installation of a new upgraded set, new cameras, and made some fresh personnel changes.

In 2019, Fee recruited Joe Perkins from CTV Vancouver Island to anchor the now hour-long 6 p.m. newscast.

In 2021, CHEK carved out a new role by bringing in Rob Shaw, a longtime Vancouver Sun legislative columnist and reporter, as the station's first political correspondent.

The same year, CHEK launched its foray into community podcasts, producing MicCHEK, Political Capital, Our Native Land and Chamber Chats. It also launched a popular newscast segment featuring positive news called "The Upside" hosted by Jeff King and Ed Bain.

In 2023, Joe Perkins took over as news director. Perkins' first move was recruiting Global BC morning show host Paul Haysom to take over as the 6 p.m. news anchor. Perkins also promoted CHEK reporter April Lawrence to executive producer and hired long-time CTV Vancouver Island anchor/reporter Jordan Cunningham, as well as Our Native Land's Tchadas Leo as a multimedia journalist.

=== Notable former on-air staff ===
- Mi-Jung Lee
- Pamela Martin
- Harvey Oberfeld
- Tony Parsons
- Michaela Pereira
- Judi Tyabji

== Technical information ==
=== Subchannel ===
Subchannel of CHEK-DT
Channel	Res.	Short name	Programming
6.1	1080i	CHEK-HD	Main CHEK-DT programming

=== Spectrum repacking ===
In April 2017, Industry Canada posted new channel assignments for stations as a result of spectrum repacking due to the US 600 MHz spectrum auction. CHEK-DT moved to channel 16 on July 3, 2020.

=== Analogue-to-digital conversion ===
CHEK flash cut its digital signal into operation, over UHF channel 49, on August 31, 2011, the official date on which Canadian television stations in CRTC-designated mandatory markets transitioned from analogue to digital broadcasts. Digital television receivers display CHEK-DT's virtual channel as its analog-era VHF channel 6. Due to technical issues with the digital transmitter, the analogue transmitter did not shut down until October 26, 2011; it was the last television station in the Vancouver–Victoria market to continue operating its main analogue transmitter, making Calgary the largest market in Western Canada to have an analogue station operate over-the-air and also unseating Edmonton as Canada's second-largest market to have all of its stations convert to digital-only broadcasts. While all Vancouver and Victoria area television stations continued operating analogue signals until August 31, CHEK-TV was the only such station in the Vancouver–Victoria market, as all of the other transmitters in these markets shut down as required by 12 a.m. on September 1, 2011. KVOS-TV (channel 12) in nearby Bellingham, Washington was the first television station that served Vancouver to shut down its analogue signal on February 17, 2009, as part of the digital television transition in the United States.

CHEK-TV was not the last analogue transmitter to shut down as part of Canada's August 31, 2011, digital conversion deadline in mandatory markets. A handful of other transmitters in Canada were also late to shut down, though unlike CHEK-DT, the other stations did not have their digital transmitters on-air by August 31, 2011.

=== Transmitter ===
Station	City of licence	Channel	ERP	HAAT	Transmitter coordinates
CHEK-TV-2	River Jordan	11 (VHF)	0.06 kW	N/A	48°22′39″N 123°55′20″W

Note:

- On November 18, 2011, CHEK-TV received approval from the CRTC to shut down its Sooke transmitter.
- On July 24, 2014, CHEK-TV received approval from the CRTC to shut down its Port Alberni and Campbell River transmitters, with their final day of broadcast being September 1, 2014.

Former transmitters

Station	City of licence	Channel	ERP	HAAT	Transmitter coordinates
CHEK-TV-1	Sooke	13 (VHF)	0.01 kW	N/A	48°21′27″N 123°41′15″W
CHEK-TV-3	Port Alberni	11 (VHF)	0.01 kW	N/A	49°17′4″N 124°43′20″W
CHEK-TV-5	Campbell River	13 (VHF)	3 kW	455 m	49°44′54″N 125°14′58″W
CHWM-TV-1	Whistler	18 (UHF)	0.001 kW	N/A	50°7′18.84″N 123°1′26.4″W

== See also ==
- 2001 Vancouver TV realignment
