= Bill Good =

Canadian radio and television personality

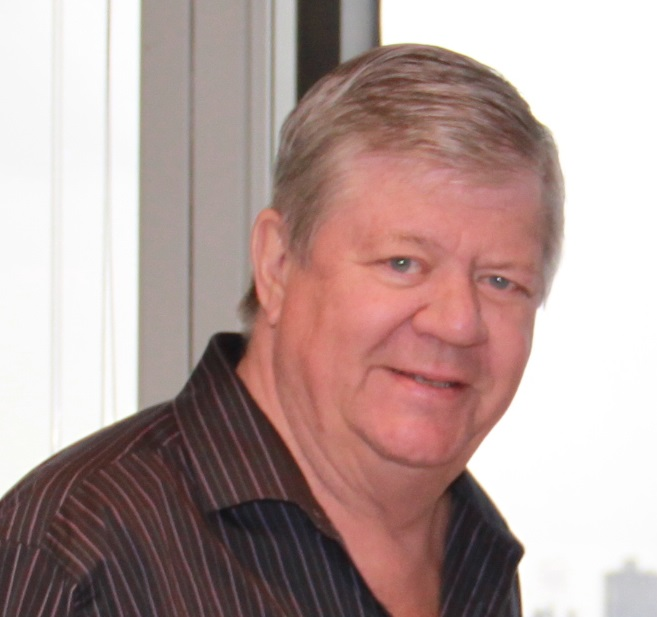
- Bill Good in 2014
- Born: 1945 (age 80–81)
- Occupation: Radio/TV broadcaster
- Years active: 1966–present

Bill Good Jr. (born 1945) is a Canadian television personality and host of talk radio shows, all in the province of British Columbia. After 21 years with the Canadian Broadcasting Corporation, first doing radio before moving to Television news, he hosted talk radio at CKNW for 26 years. He also anchored evening news broadcasts on BCTV and CIVT between 1993 and 2010.

== Career ==
He worked for CFPR in Prince Rupert. That led to a permanent job at a newly opened station CHTK-FM in the same city. After a year he went to CFAX in Victoria and joined the CBC in 1967.

In the 1970s, he worked for CBC Sports, where one of his duties was hosting Hockey Night in Canada broadcasts originating from Vancouver. In 1978, he moved to CBUT in Vancouver, where he anchored NewsCentre until 1988 when he joined CKNW.

From 1993 to 2001, he anchored the Vancouver edition of Canada Tonight, broadcast on BCTV (then Vancouver's CTV affiliate). He moved to CTV Vancouver in 2001 after that station became Vancouver's CTV O&O.

He formerly co-anchored the 6:00pm newscast on CTV Vancouver alongside Pamela Martin.

In July 2014, Good announced he would retire on 1 August after 26 years at CKNW. He returned to the airwaves on 8 September 2015 as host of a daily editorial commentary feature, A Minute with Bill Good on NEWS 1130. He also previously appeared in television advertisements for the home lending company Capital Direct.

== Family broadcasting history ==
His father, Bill Good Sr., was also a well-known sports and newscaster in Vancouver, known as "Breathless Bill" for his four- to five-hour commercial-free broadcast coverage of Canadian Open and Amateur golf championships.

His brother, John Good, also worked in radio and television, mostly in Toronto and eastern Canada before returning to Vancouver as part of the on-air talent during the launch of CKVU, a new TV station in the late 1970s. He helped create Sports Page, a longstanding sports program and the national business program Venture. John Good retired from TV work to enter private business in 1980 and went on to work in capital markets.

== Awards ==
- Bruce Hutchison Lifetime Achievement Award - Jack Webster Foundation
- ACTRA
- RTNDA Canada
