= Western International Communications =

Former Canadian media company

WIC Western International Communications Ltd.
- Type: Private
- Industry: Media
- Founded: 1982; 44 years ago
- Defunct: 2000; 26 years ago
- Fate: Assets sold to Canwest Global (later Shaw Media), Shaw Communications, and Corus Entertainment
- Successor: Corus Entertainment (most media assets); Rogers Communications (satellite distribution assets)
- Products: Specialty channels, broadcasting, satellite distribution
- Website: wic.ca (archived 2000-02-29)

WIC Western International Communications Ltd. (Note: The company's full legal name included, seemingly redundantly, both the "WIC" acronym and its expanded form.) (or WIC) was a Canadian media company that operated from 1982 to 2000, with operations including broadcast and specialty television, radio, and satellite distribution via a majority interest in Canadian Satellite Communications (or Cancom).

The company itself was acquired by CanWest Global Communications, which kept most of WIC's broadcast television stations and a variety of related television production assets. As a result of a takeover battle leading up to the acquisition, Shaw Communications assumed WIC's interest in Cancom, while a separate company owned by the same Shaw family, Corus Entertainment, acquired various radio stations and specialty services. A handful of assets would be acquired by other companies for competitive reasons.

With the sale of Canwest's broadcasting assets to Shaw a decade later, the Shaw family at that point controlled almost all of the assets of the former WIC – through either Shaw or Corus – the sole exceptions being a handful of resold local TV stations and specialty channel assets, including interests in the now defunct Family Channel and ROBTv (now BNN Bloomberg, owned by Bell Media). Corus acquired Shaw Media in 2016, giving Corus the former media assets of WIC, such as its former local television, specialty services, and radio groups. Shaw Communications, including the former Cancom, was acquired by Rogers Communications in 2023.

== History ==
Frank Griffiths established Western Broadcasting Company Ltd. in the late 1950s to hold his various broadcasting assets in British Columbia, including radio station CKNW and a majority interest in BCTV, at the time Vancouver's CTV affiliate, and in 1963 added Victoria's CHEK, which became BCTV's sister station. WBC was publicly traded for a time but was later reacquired by Griffiths's family.

In 1982, the Griffiths' media assets were again floated on the public markets in a restructured form via WIC. The Griffiths retained Western Broadcasting, which in turn held all of WIC's Class A voting shares; the Class B shares were sold to the public. Class B shares did not generally provide voting rights, but would be converted to voting shares should a majority of Class A shares change hands, a so-called coat-tail provision.

Over time, WIC would acquire various broadcasting assets from other companies, including Selkirk Communications – the other major shareholder of BCTV, and also the owner of independent stations CHCH-TV Hamilton and CFAC-TV (now CICT-TV) Calgary – as well as Charles Allard's company Allarcom, which had launched CITV-TV Edmonton and pay television service Superchannel. Its final major acquisition was Montreal's CFCF-TV, which it bought in 1997.

=== Takeover battle ===
In 1997, wanting to exit the broadcasting business, the Griffiths agreed to sell WIC to Shaw Communications. Initially, they sold 49.98% of their Class A shares to Shaw, 49.98% to the Allard family, and 0.04% to CanWest, in order to evade the coat-tail provision while Shaw completed a takeover bid for the non-voting shares.

However, CanWest also coveted WIC, primarily for its independent television stations in Alberta, the largest remaining hole in the company's Global Television Network, Canada's third English-language over-the-air television network. CanWest also offered to buy the Class B shares and filed a lawsuit claiming that the division of Class A shares constituted a change of control.

The lawsuit eventually stalled, and CanWest and Shaw each ended garnered over 40% of Class B shares. The negotiations between Shaw and CanWest continued until 1999, when the two parties, as well as Corus Entertainment, agreed to split the assets. (Note: Corus, consisting of Shaw's former broadcasting division, had been spun off from Shaw earlier in the year, in the process receiving some of Shaw's interest in WIC.)

Under the agreement, CanWest was to acquire WIC's broadcast television division, various production assets, as well as its interests in Report on Business Television. However, in Montreal, where CanWest chose to keep its existing Global station CKMI, the company was required to divest CFCF, and eventually sold it to CTV. Montreal's anglophone population was too small to allow one company to own both of that city's anglophone stations. CanWest also retained WIC's interest in Report on Business Television; it was subsequently sold to rival Bell Globemedia when that company acquired The Globe and Mail, which owned the remainder.

Shaw would acquire WIC's interests in Canadian Satellite Communications, which was in the process of merging with Shaw-controlled direct-to-home satellite provider Star Choice, meaning that Shaw would obtain a larger majority interest in the combined company. Cancom would be privatized by Shaw a few years later.

Meanwhile, Corus was to acquire WIC's radio, specialty, and premium television assets. The CRTC approved the sale of the radio stations, MovieMax, SuperChannel, and WIC's video on demand services to Corus, but required WIC's shares of The Family Channel and Teletoon be sold to a new buyer. Astral Media acquired those shares in 2001. (Note: Corus already held a minority interest in Teletoon, which - following subsequent acquisitions - was run as a 50/50 joint venture with Astral. Teletoon became wholly owned by Corus in 2013, due to Astral Media's takeover by Bell Media.)

=== Effects of WIC breakup ===
CanWest's acquisition of WIC's television stations finally brought the Global network's service to Alberta, where the Canadian Radio-television and Telecommunications Commission had repeatedly denied the company's applications to open new stations. An earlier application by Global in 1997 had been turned down in favour of Craig Media's A-Channel system. However, the WIC stations there were already purchasing broadcast rights to some of Global's programming.

In Vancouver and Victoria, Canwest's acquisition of CHAN set off one of the largest single-market network association shakeups in North American television history. There was already a Global owned-and-operated station in the Vancouver market, CKVU, but Canwest decided to sell that station and keep CHAN instead.

As a result, on September 1, 2001, the Global brand and programming moved from CKVU to CHAN, the CTV association moved from CHAN to CIVT, and CKVU was purchased by CHUM Limited, adopting the Citytv brand the following year. CHEK also changed its association, from CTV to Global's new CH system; a NewNet station in Victoria, CIVI, as well as religious station CHNU-TV, also launched around the same time.

CHCH and CJNT's signals also overlapped with existing Global stations; these two stations were integrated with CHEK into the CH system. CKRD disaffiliated from the CBC in September, 2005, becoming CHCA, the fourth CH station. (Note: CHCA would later go off the air on August 31, 2009) CHBC's similar disaffiliation was approved by the CRTC on February 28, 2005, and disaffiliated on February 27, 2006, to join the CH system. (Note: Although CHBC did not use the CH brand on-air, but rather its call letters, as it had done throughout its existence, until September 7, 2007, when it began using the E! brand for all programs outside of local news and regional programming.) Montreal was largely unaffected by the breakup of WIC. The breakup did, however, result in the CBC, CTV and Global affiliates becoming network owned-and-operated stations, as Montreal was the largest television market in which CTV did not own its affiliate. Moreover, CJNT, which had been sister station to CFCF, became sister station to CKMI.

Global did not have a true national newscast before it acquired WIC, although it aired First National in Ontario, Manitoba and, later, Quebec. On acquiring WIC, Global briefly replaced First National with Canada Tonight on stations carrying that program, and premiered its successor, Global National, on September 3, 2001.

=== Later ramifications ===
While the acquisition was important to fill in some of the gaps of the Global network in western Canada, it eventually proved to be something of a Pyrrhic victory. Canwest fell into bankruptcy protection in 2009 under the weight of debt from various acquisitions including WIC, but more critically the larger purchases of the Southam newspaper chain and the broadcasting assets of Alliance Atlantis. In the process, it closed the CH / E! system, leading in turn to the sale of three of the WIC stations Canwest had acquired in 2000 (CHCH, CJNT, and CHEK), the conversion of another to a Global station (CHBC), and the closure of one other (CHCA).

In 2010, Shaw announced a deal to buy the entirety of Canwest's broadcasting division, which would place most of the former WIC assets under the control of the Shaw family, through either Shaw or Corus. The deal was completed that October, with the Canwest properties now being part of Shaw Media.

On January 13, 2016, the aforementioned Corus Entertainment, which remained under the control of the Shaw family and retained all of the former WIC radio properties, announced that it would acquire Shaw Media (including much of WIC's former group of local television stations) for $2.65 billion. The sale, which was intended to help fund Shaw Communications' purchase of Wind Mobile, required shareholder and CRTC approval, but closed less than three months later, on April 1, 2016. At the time Corus also owned WIC's former pay television properties (by then known as Movie Central and Encore Avenue), but the company had announced in late 2015 it would sell those services' subscriber base and programming rights to Bell Media's The Movie Network, which took effect on March 1, 2016 (TMN was later renamed to Crave after a streaming service of the same name).

== Assets ==
=== Television stations ===
WIC was primarily an ownership group, not a television network. Some WIC stations were network affiliates of CBC or CTV, while others operated as independent stations, although some of these stations also had program supply agreements with CanWest. At the same time however, WIC produced or purchased Canadian rights to enough programs to fill the schedule of CHCH (which had no third-party programming source), and many of these programs, including the newscast Canada Tonight and foreign programming such as Touched by an Angel, aired on other WIC stations. The WIC library of programming would ultimately form the initial basis of Canwest's ill-fated second broadcast service, CH (later E!).

At the time of its sale to CanWest, WIC owned the following stations. The year WIC first acquired control of each station, and the programming carried by each station immediately prior to the breakup of the company, is also noted.

City	Station	Year acquired	Primary programming source	Other programming sources	Current status
Calgary	CICT	1989	Global (Note: Although the station in question was nominally independent, the vast majority of its primetime programming was supplied by Canwest.)	WIC	Global O&O
Edmonton	CITV	1991	Global	WIC	Global O&O
Hamilton	CHCH	1990	Independent (WIC programs only)	N/A	Independent station owned by Channel Zero
Lethbridge	CISA	1989	Global	WIC	Global O&O
Kelowna	CHBC	1989 (Note: WIC was already a partial owner of these stations, but acquired the remainder of each station, specifically 50% of CHBC and 41% of each of CHAN and CHEK, from Selkirk Communications (via Maclean-Hunter) in 1989.)	CBC	Global / WIC	Global O&O
Montreal	CFCF	1997	CTV	WIC	CTV O&O
Montreal	CJNT	1999	Independent multicultural	N/A	Citytv O&O
Red Deer	CKRD	1991	CBC	Global / WIC (programs not carried on CICT/CITV)	Later CHCA; closed in 2009 following shutdown of CH / E!
Vancouver	CHAN	1982	CTV	WIC	Global O&O
Victoria	CHEK	1982	CTV (timeshifted)	WIC (different programs from those on CHAN)	Independent station owned by CHEK Media Group

WIC's CTV affiliates, CHAN and CHEK, as well as CFCF (even before its acquisition by WIC), had a hostile relationship with the network, due to these stations' desire to take a greater role in Canadian program production for the network. This relationship deteriorated even further in 1997, when rival Baton Broadcasting became the sole corporate owner of CTV, and opened its own independent station, CIVT, in Vancouver. Baton, which owned the national rights to many programs aired in Vancouver on CHAN or CHEK, was able to move these programs, now being advertised as CTV programs outside British Columbia, to CIVT. However, the CTV network, which supplied 40 hours of programming each week, was still bound by affiliation agreements with CHAN and CHEK; these agreements did not end until September 2001.

Unlike many other ownership groups, which during the 1990s tended to brand their stations generically under a network / system brand (sometimes combined with the station call sign), WIC tended to favour regionally based station branding. For example, under WIC's ownership, CHAN used the brand BCTV, with CICT being known as Calgary 7 and CKRD Red Deer as RDTV. WIC also changed CHCH's branding to OnTV in 1997, when the station added several rebroadcast transmitters throughout Ontario.

=== Specialty and premium television ===
- Superchannel (later Movie Central; now defunct)
- MovieMax (later Encore Avenue; now defunct)
- Viewers Choice in Western Canada (now Shaw PPV)
- Report on Business Television (now BNN Bloomberg) - 50%
- Family Channel - 50%
- Teletoon (now Cartoon Network) and Télétoon - both 20% (via 40% total interests that were held by Family Channel)

=== Radio stations ===
At the time of its sale to CanWest, Western International Communications owned 12 radio stations. These were acquired by Corus Entertainment.

- Calgary - CHQR, CKIK
- Edmonton - CHED, CKNG
- Hamilton - CHML, CJXY
- Toronto - CFYI, CILQ
- Vancouver - CKNW, CFMI
- Winnipeg - CJOB, CJKR
