= Kevin Newman (journalist) =

Canadian journalist and news anchor (born 1959)

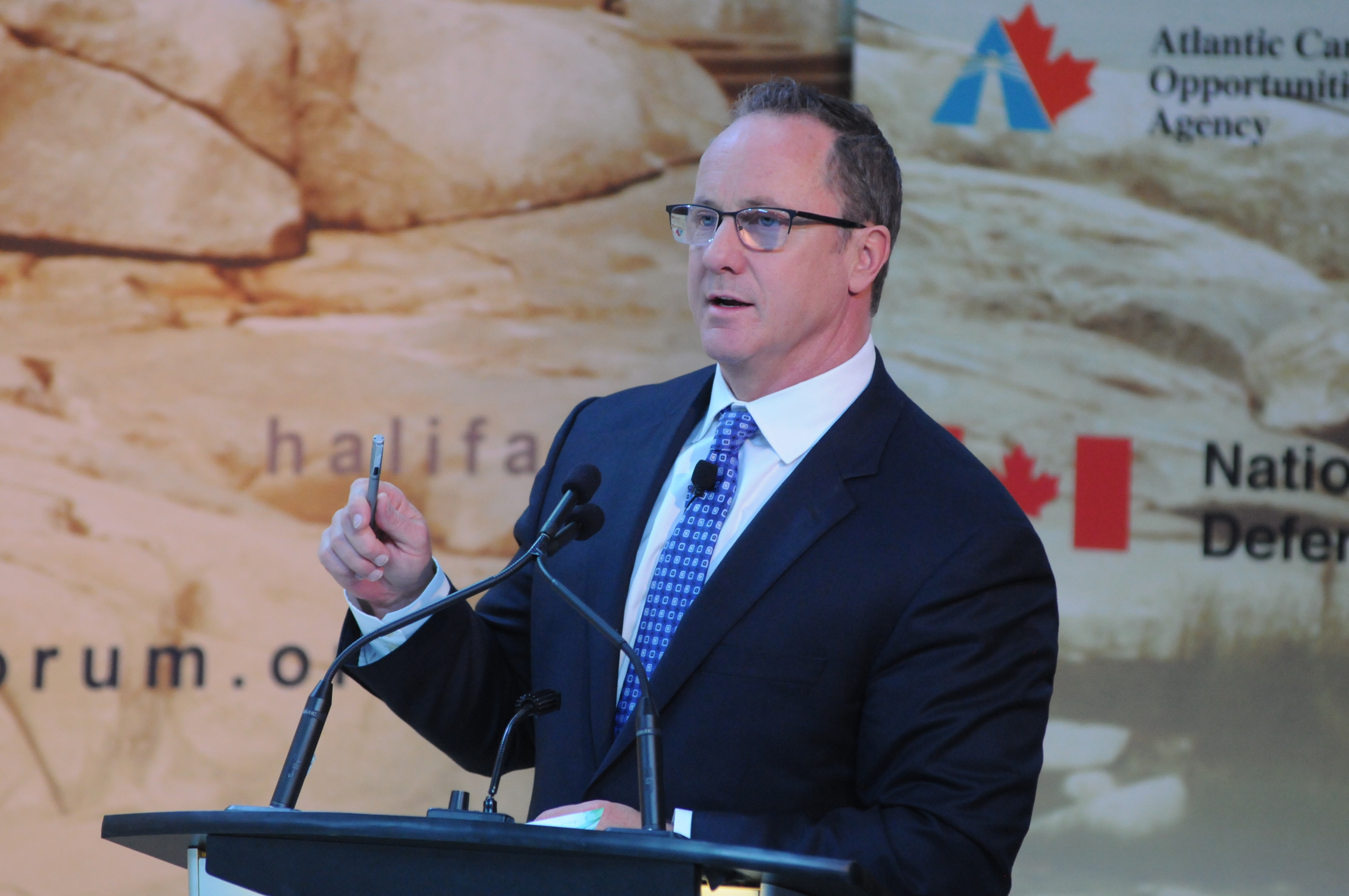
- Newman at the Halifax International Security Forum 2012
- Born: Kevin Newman; June 2, 1959 (age 67); Toronto, Ontario, Canada
- Occupations: news anchor, reporter
- Years active: 1981–present
- Notable credit(s): CTV News (1986–1988; 2012–2019); CBC News (1988–1994); ABC World News Now (1994–1996); Good Morning America (1997–1999); Global National (1981–1986; 2001–2010)
- Spouse: Cathy Kearns

Kevin Newman (born June 2, 1959) is a Canadian journalist and news anchor. From 2001 to 2010, he was the chief anchor and executive editor of Global National. In August 2014, he became a substitute anchor of CTV National News with Lisa LaFlamme and in September 2016 was named host and managing editor of the weekly Investigative program W5.

He is co-author of All Out, a memoir written with his son Alex.

== Life and career ==
Newman was born in Toronto, Ontario. He began his career in broadcasting at CHRW radio in London, Ontario, becoming the first news director and working on Western Mustangs football broadcasts as the campus station of the University of Western Ontario formally organized. After graduating, he landed his first job as a reporter for Global Ontario in 1981. In 1986, he moved to CTV as the network's parliamentary correspondent, and in 1988 he joined CBC Television as a reporter and anchor, hosting Midday from 1992 to 1994. He was also a substitute anchor on The National.

In 1994, Newman moved to ABC News in the United States, where he anchored ABC World News Now until 1996. He also anchored ABC World News This Morning, and served as a correspondent for World News Tonight. In June 1997, ABC News assigned Newman as newsreader of Good Morning America after the departure of Elizabeth Vargas. In May 1998, he was named co-anchor, with Lisa McRee, of Good Morning America. The show, which had been struggling in the ratings, continued to perform poorly, and both McRee and Newman were reassigned in January 1999 to other reporting duties within ABC, with Newman becoming a correspondent for Nightline and as a substitute anchor for fellow Canadian Peter Jennings and Carole Simpson on both the weeknight and Sunday editions of World News Tonight. Newman anchored breaking news coverage of the death of Diana, Princess of Wales.

In 2001, Global Television launched Global National, and lured Newman back home to become its first anchor and executive editor.

Newman received the Gemini Awards for Best News Anchor in 2005 and 2006. Newman, along with Global National's Kenton Boston, Doriana Temolo, Marc Riddell and Jason Keel won the Gemini Award for Best Newscast in 2007. Newman is the founder of NewMan Media Ltd.

In April 2010, Newman announced his resignation from Global Television, effective August 30, 2010. Dawna Friesen was named as his successor on July 13, 2010, and made her on-air debut on September 20, 2010.

In 2011, Newman was appointed to the board of directors of Communitech, an association representing tech companies in the Regional Municipality of Waterloo.

In August 2012, CTV News announced Newman would become the host of Question Period and a regular contributor to its investigative series W5. Newman also serves as 'Digital News Evangelist' for Bell Media.

In August 2013 CTV News announced that Newman would host a new prime time show on CTV News Channel called Kevin Newman Live, which premiered on November 18, 2013. The show was cancelled seven months later.

In late 2014, Newman became a fill-in anchor for the flagship newscast CTV National News, and in September 2016 was named host and managing editor of the weekly Investigative program W5.

As of September 2019, Newman has retired from network television, and now operates his own business, Kevin Newman Ideas, that produces TV shows, specials, and documentaries.

== Personal life ==
On June 13, 2011, Newman received an honorary Doctor of Laws degree from the University of Western Ontario.

Newman is married to Cathy Kearns, and the couple have two children: a son, Alex and a daughter, Erica. In 2015, Newman and his son Alex published All Out: A Father and Son Confront the Hard Truths That Made Them Better Men, a cowritten memoir of their relationship before and after Alex came out as gay at age 17.

He is the grandson of municipal politician Jean Newman, the first woman elected to Toronto's Board of Control and the first woman to run for Mayor of Toronto.
