= 2008 in Canadian television =

This is a list of Canadian television related events from 2008.

== Events ==
Date	Event
February 11	Global National moves its main studio from Vancouver to Ottawa.
February 14	Launch of new television channel Cosmopolitan TV.
March 7	Corus Entertainment announces a takeover offer for Canadian Learning Television.
March 31	The CRTC approves the sale of CHNU-TV in Vancouver and CIIT-TV in Winnipeg from Rogers Media to S-VOX, as well as the sale of CHNM-TV in Vancouver from Multivan to Rogers.
April 25	Film producer Remstar Corporation applies to the CRTC to acquire the insolvent TQS network in Quebec from Cogeco. The Canadian Broadcasting Corporation submits a simultaneous application to acquire the three Cogeco-owned Télévision de Radio-Canada affiliates.
June 26	The CRTC approves the Cogeco television sales (see April 25 above).
August 11	A-Channel and Atlantic Satellite Network are officially rebranded as A.
September 1	Omni Television launches CJCO-TV in Calgary and CJEO-TV in Edmonton. CHNM-TV in Vancouver is also rebranded as "Omni".
September 1	S-VOX's religious stations (see March 31 above) are rebranded as Joytv.
September 8	Theo Tams is named winner of the sixth and final season of Canadian Idol.
October 30	Launch of the Canadian version of HBO.
November 28	2008 Gemini Awards.
December 7	Charles-Éric Boncoeur wins the fifth season of Loft Story.

=== Debuts ===
Show	Station	Premiere Date
The Border	CBC	January 7
Miss Météo	Séries+	January 8
jPod	CBC	January 8
Sophie	CBC	January 9
MVP	CBC	January 11
Steven and Chris	CBC	January 14
The Week the Women Went	CBC	January 21
The Guard	Global	January 22
Murdoch Mysteries	Citytv	January 24
Météo+	TFO	February 14
Kim's Rude Awakenings	W Network	March 4
The Latest Buzz	Family	March 14
The Daily	Joytv	June 9
He Said, She Said	W Network	July 2
Flashpoint	CTV	July 11
The Next Star	YTV	July 18
Anna & Kristina's Grocery Bag	W Network	September 3
So You Think You Can Dance Canada	CTV	September 11
Less Than Kind	Citytv	October 13
16x9 - The Bigger Picture	Global	November 30
The Decorating Adventures of Ambrose Price	HGTV	December 8

=== Ending this year ===
Show	Station	Cancelled
George of the Jungle	Teletoon	January 11
Atomic Betty	Teletoon	January 29
Class of the Titans	Teletoon	February 2
Ants in Your Pants	Treehouse TV	February 20
About a Girl	Global	February 29
Whistler	CTV	April 19
ReGenesis	The Movie Network	May 25
Ruby Gloom	YTV	June 1
Instant Star	CTV	June 28
Robson Arms	CTV	June 30
Delilah and Julius	Teletoon	August 16
The Baby Blue Movie	Citytv	August 30
Ed & Red's Night Party	Citytv	August 31
Speakers' Corner	Citytv/A-Channel	August 31
Wayside	Teletoon	September 1
Paradise Falls	Showcase	September 26
Total Drama Island	Teletoon	November 29
Trailer Park Boys	Showcase	December 7
Royal Canadian Air Farce	CBC	December 31

== Television shows ==
=== 1950s ===
- Hockey Night in Canada (1952–present, sports telecast)
- The National (1954–present, news program)

=== 1960s ===
- CTV National News (1961–present)
- Land and Sea (1964–present)
- The Nature of Things (1960–present, scientific documentary series)
- Question Period (1967–present, news program)
- W-FIVE (1966–present, newsmagazine program)

=== 1970s ===
- Canada AM (1972–present, news program)
- the fifth estate (1975–present, newsmagazine program)
- Marketplace (1972–present, newsmagazine program)
- 100 Huntley Street (1977–present, religious program)

=== 1980s ===
- CityLine (1987–present, news program)
- Fashion File (1989–2009)
- Just For Laughs (1988–present)

=== 1990s ===
- CBC News Morning (1999–present)
- Daily Planet (1995–present)
- eTalk (1995–present, entertainment newsmagazine program)
- The Passionate Eye (1993–present)
- Royal Canadian Air Farce (1993–2008, comedy sketch series)
- This Hour Has 22 Minutes (1992–present)

=== 2000s ===
- Atomic Betty (2004–present, children's animated series)
- The Best Years (2007–present)
- Billable Hours (2006–2008)
- The Border (2008–present)
- Canadian Idol (2003–2008)
- Captain Flamingo (2006–present, children's animated series)
- CBC News: Sunday Night (2004–present)
- Chilly Beach (2003–present, animated series)
- Class of the Titans (2005–2008, animated series)
- Corner Gas (2004–2009)
- Canada's Worst Driver (2005–present, reality series)
- Le Cœur a ses raisons (2005–present)
- Da Kink in My Hair (2007–present)
- Degrassi: The Next Generation (2001–present)
- Dragons' Den (2006–present)
- Doc Zone (2006–present)
- Durham County (2007–present)
- ET Canada (2005–present)
- Flashpoint (2008–present)
- Global Currents (2005–present, newsmagazine/documentary series)
- Grossology (2006–present, children's animated series)
- The Guard (2008–present)
- Heartland (2007–present)
- The Hour (2005–present, talk show)
- Instant Star (2004–2008)
- JR Digs (2001–present, comedy prank series)
- Kenny vs. Spenny (2002–2010, comedy reality series)
- Little Mosque on the Prairie (2007–present)
- Mantracker (2006–present, reality series)
- Murdoch Mysteries (2008–present)
- Odd Job Jack (animated series, 2003–present)
- Paradise Falls (2001–present)
- ReGenesis (2004–2008)
- Restaurant Makeover (2005–2008)
- Rick Mercer Report (2004–present)
- Robson Arms (2005–2008)
- 6Teen (2004–present, animated series)
- 16x9 - The Bigger Picture (2008–present, newsmagazine program)
- Total Drama (2007–present, animated series)
- Trailer Park Boys (2001–2008)
- Whistler (2006–2008)

== TV movies & miniseries ==
- Anne of Green Gables: A New Beginning
- Elijah
- Guns
- Mayerthorpe
- Murder on Her Mind
- Sticks and Stones
- The Terrorist Next Door
- Victor
- Would Be Kings

== Television stations ==
=== Debuts ===
Date	Market	Station	Channel	Affiliation	Notes/References
September 15	Calgary, Alberta	CJCO-TV	38	Omni Television	
September 15	Edmonton, Alberta	CJEO-TV	56	Omni Television	

=== Network affiliation changes ===
Date	Market	Station	Channel	Old affiliation	New affiliation	References
Vancouver, British Columbia	CHNU-TV/DT	66 (analogue); 66.1 (digital)	Independent	Joytv		

== See also ==
- 2008 in Canada
- List of Canadian films of 2008
