= 2007 Canadian broadcast television realignment =

Ownership and network changes affecting television stations in Canada

In 2007, significant ownership changes occurred in Canada's broadcast television industry, involving nearly every private English-language network and television system. In addition to the shuffling of network affiliations and mergers involving various networks, several new television stations and rebroadcast transmitters also signed on the air.

== Sale of CHUM Limited to Bell Globemedia ==
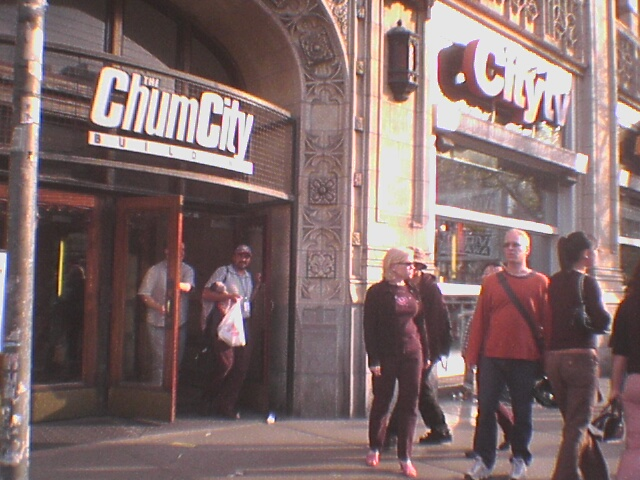
CHUM Television's (now CTV Limited's) headquarters at 299 Queen Street West in Toronto (then known as the CHUMCity Building).

In 2006, following the death of longtime chairman Allan Waters, CHUM Limited decided to cease operations and sell its broadcasting assets to a willing bidder. Bell Globemedia (later CTVglobemedia, now Bell Media) announced a $1.7 billion takeover offer for CHUM on July 12 of that year.

Bell Globemedia initially intended to retain CHUM's Citytv television system and its five large-market stations, as well as the company's numerous specialty channels; Bell would also sell off the smaller-market A-Channel stations along with several specialty channels. Rogers Communications originally placed a bid to purchase the A-Channel stations; CKX-TV (channel 5) in Brandon, Manitoba; Alberta educational station Access; and specialty channels SexTV and Canadian Learning Television.

However, the Canadian Radio-television and Telecommunications Commission (CRTC) denied CTV's acquisition of the Citytv stations, as all five stations – CITY-TV (channel 57) in Toronto, CKVU-TV (channel 10) in Vancouver, CKEM-TV (channel 51) in Edmonton, CKAL-TV (channel 5) in Calgary and CHMI-TV (channel 13) in Portage la Prairie-Winnipeg – were based in markets where CTV already maintained owned-and-operated stations (O&O), and therefore CTV's retention of Citytv would have violated a provision in the Commission's media ownership limits, which bar broadcasters from owning two English-language television stations in major metropolitan areas. CTV was, however, allowed to retain control of the A-Channel stations (a few of the A-Channel stations were based in cities adjacent to the major five metropolitan areas such as Victoria, British Columbia; London and Barrie, Ontario; CRTC rules permit English-language commercial twinsticks in major markets provided that the stations have differing cities of license) and all of CHUM's specialty channels.

Soon afterwards, Rogers Communications placed a new bid to purchase the Citytv system as a complement to its own Omni Television, a system of multicultural stations that incorporate programming in various languages.

=== CTVglobemedia ===
After Bell Globemedia's bid to purchase Citytv stations, and sell off the A-Channel stations, CKX-TV, and several other digital specialty channels denied by the CRTC, the outcome resulted in CTV putting the Citytv stations in a trust held by corporate lawyer John McKellar in the interim while it searched for a buyer. Rogers Communications, which had originally bid on the A-Channel stations prior to the CRTC decision, placed a new bid for the Citytv stations a few days later, which was approved by the CRTC on September 28, 2007.

CHUM Limited officially ceased operations on June 22, 2007. With the exception of the Citytv stations and its French language music specialty channels MusiquePlus and Musimax, all of the CHUM Limited properties – including the A-Channel stations, CKX-TV, (an independent television station in Brandon, Manitoba), its cable specialty services (such as MuchMusic, Star!, Space, Bravo! and CP24) and radio stations – became part of the restructured CTVglobemedia on that date.

A-Channel's original 2007–08 schedule was announced in early June, before the takeover received CRTC approval. By September, CTV had radically altered the system's schedule to give A-Channel broadcast rights to several series that CTV had not been able to find time slots for on its own fall schedule, including Two and a Half Men, Scrubs, 30 Rock and the Canadian-produced series Jeff Ltd. The A-Channel system along with the Atlantic Satellite Network were later rebranded as A on August 11, 2008.

CTVglobemedia announced on November 16, 2007, that it and the channel's co-owner Comcast would sell their remaining interest in specialty channel OLN to Rogers Communications. Nearly five months later on March 8, 2008, the company announced that it would sell Canadian Learning Television to Corus Entertainment.

=== Rogers Communications ===
Rogers Communications had wanted to gain a multicultural station in Vancouver for a long time, but was either denied by the CRTC and competitor station CHNM-TV (channel 66; branded as "Channel M"), or was outbid while vying for local stations up on the market by other broadcasters. In 2005, opportunity arose when Rogers was given permission to purchase religious broadcaster Trinity Television, owner of Fraser Valley television station CHNU-TV (channel 66) and the license for Winnipeg station CIIT-TV (channel 35).

In 2007, both Multivan Broadcasting (owner of CHNM) and Rogers submitted bids for television stations in Edmonton and Calgary during a call by the CRTC for broadcasters to submit new broadcast licence applications. The licences were awarded to Rogers, which launched CJCO-TV (channel 38) and CJEO-TV (channel 56) as religious stations in the respective markets on September 15, 2008. Shortly afterward, Multivan entered a tentative deal to sell CHNM to Rogers, citing the loss of the Calgary and Edmonton licenses as leaving the company no longer able to compete as a standalone station. On November 6, 2007, Rogers also announced the intention to sell its CHNU-TV and CIIT-TV to S-VOX. Rogers' acquisition of CHNM and its sale of CHNU and CIIT to S-VOX were both approved by the CRTC on March 31, 2008.

On September 1, 2008, CHNM was relaunched as an Omni Television station (branded as "OMNI British Columbia"), while S-VOX relaunched CIIT and CHNU respectively as "Joytv 11" and "Joytv 10" (in reference to the cable channel allocations of both stations in their respective markets).

In addition, Rogers applied to purchase the Citytv stations for an estimated $375 million. Media analysts suggested that with a more powerful media conglomerate such as Rogers behind them, the Citytv stations would effectively expand to become Canada's fourth full-fledged commercial television network, in effect if not immediately in name. The Citytv transaction was approved by the CRTC on September 28, 2007, with Rogers officially becoming the system's new owner on October 31. Rogers acquired the remaining interest in OLN from CTVglobemedia and Comcast on August 31, 2008.

== CanWest Global ==
=== CH becomes E! ===
On September 7, 2007, Canwest Global rebranded its CH television system as E!, following an agreement it struck with Comcast – then the parent company of the E! cable channel in the United States (now owned by Comcast division NBCUniversal) – which saw the two broadcasters share certain programming. Simultaneously, the system's six owned-and-operated stations restored the use of call signs as branding (a decision was made at least in part to avoid confusion with the entertainment news program E! News, while also intended to ensure that local newscasts on the O&Os were not perceived as celebrity-oriented). Red Deer, Alberta O&O CHCA-TV (channel 6) was also granted permission to increase its transmitter power to reach its signal into Edmonton and Calgary, a request that the CRTC had previously denied.

=== Acquisition of Alliance Atlantis ===
Canwest, in conjunction with Goldman Sachs, also applied to the CRTC to purchase the assets of Alliance Atlantis, a broadcasting and film production and distribution company which operated 13 specialty cable channels and held partial ownership of seven other specialty channels. The transaction was approved by the CRTC in early January 2008. Canwest sold off the production division, but retained ownership of the cable channels.

== Other changes ==
=== Crossroads Television System expansion ===
The Crossroads Television System (later renamed Yes TV in September 2014), a religious broadcaster which also incorporates family-oriented secular programming and originated on Hamilton, Ontario, station CITS-TV (channel 36), also expanded in 2007, with the Canadian Radio-television and Telecommunications Commission granting CTS licences to launch two new stations: CKCS-TV (channel 32) in Calgary and CKES-TV (channel 45) in Edmonton.

=== SUN TV expansion ===
In 2007, Quebecor Media – owners of Toronto independent station CKXT-TV (channel 52, branded as "SUN TV") – had applied for licences to operate rebroadcast transmitters in London and Ottawa, to bring the station on par with fellow Toronto-area competitors CITY-TV (the flagship of the Citytv system), CITS-TV, CFMT-TV (channel 47) and CJMT-TV (channel 40; both the flagships of Omni Television and branded respectively as "OMNI.1" and "OMNI.2"), as those stations already operated translators in those cities. The reason for this request was that it would put the station on a level playing field in regards to simultaneous substitution. This request was approved by the CRTC; the new UHF rebroadcasters signed on the air in the fall of 2008, on analog channel 26 and digital channel 19 in London, and on analog channel 54 and digital channel 20 in Ottawa.

== Current statuses ==
Canwest, amidst financial woes, announced a strategic review of the E! stations in February 2009, citing questions over the viability of owning a second broadcast television service alongside its existing Global Television Network. The company ultimately decided to disband the E! television system in August 2009 citing that "a second conventional TV network [was] no longer key to the long-term success" of Canwest; E!'s five owned-and-operated stations experienced different outcomes: E! O&Os CJNT-TV (channel 62) in Montreal and CHCH-TV (channel 11) in Hamilton were sold to Channel Zero, while CHEK-TV (channel 6) in Victoria, British Columbia – mere hours before its planned 12 midnight Pacific Time shutdown on the evening of 4 September – was sold to a consortium of station employees and local investors for CA$2; all three became independent stations upon the closure of the E! system. CHBC-TV (channel 2) in Kelowna, British Columbia, meanwhile, was retained by Canwest and converted into a Global O&O. CHCA-TV, however, shut down after it was unable to find a buyer. Shaw Communications eventually took control of Canwest's television arm in late October 2010 after Canwest sought protection from the company's creditors in late 2009, with its television properties becoming part of the new Shaw Media division.

On November 1, 2010, one year after the disbandment of the E! television system, CTVglobemedia struck a brand and program licensing agreement with Comcast to return the brand to Canada, relaunching its existing entertainment-focused specialty channel Star! as E!. BCE Inc. would eventually regain full control of CTV's broadcasting arm in April 2011, with CTVglobemedia being rebranded as Bell Media. Bell subsequently rebranded the A stations and Access as CTV Two five months later on August 29.

On July 14, 2009, following Canwest's announcement of the E! system's shutdown, the Jim Pattison Group signed an agreement with Rogers Communications to affiliate the company's three E!-affiliated stations – CFJC-TV (channel 4) in Kamloops, British Columbia, CKPG-TV (channel 2) in Prince George, British Columbia, and CHAT-TV (channel 6) in Medicine Hat, Alberta – with Citytv that September, expanding that system's reach into Western Canada (as part of a long-term affiliation renewal agreement signed with Rogers in May 2012, the Pattison stations began carrying 90% of the primetime programming and the majority of morning and daytime programs from the programming grid of Vancouver O&O CKVU-DT in September of that year, which included simulcasts of the Vancouver edition of Citytv's morning show franchise Breakfast Television; although the Pattison stations continued to produce midday and evening local newscasts, unlike CKVU, which dropped all of its other newscasts outside of Breakfast Television in 2006, shortly before the CHUM sale).

Rogers Media decided to broaden Citytv's national coverage, and transform it from a system into a television network, through the purchases of two other broadcasters; on January 17, 2012, Rogers purchased provincial educational cable channel Saskatchewan Communications Network from Bluepoint Investment Group (which following the private equity firm's purchase of the channel the previous year, had already begun incorporating entertainment programming during the late-afternoon and nighttime hours following the CRTC's approval of an amendment to SCN's licence), relaunching it as City Saskatchewan in September of that year. Subsequently, in March, Rogers purchased CJNT-DT in Montreal from Channel Zero; as part of the agreement, CJNT began carrying Citytv's prime time programming in the interim, while a licence amendment it filed to convert the multicultural station into a full-time English-language outlet underwent review with the CRTC. The CJNT sale and conversion was unanimously approved by the CRTC in December 2012, as a result of Rogers agreeing to produce 15 1/2 hours a week of local programming for CJNT (including a morning news program) and offering to contribute funding and programming to a new independent multicultural station in Montreal, which launched in August 2013 as CFHD-DT (channel 47). Coinciding with the changes, Citytv rebranded as simply City (originally verbally referred to as "City Television") on December 31, 2012, with an updated visual branding that removed the "tv" from the newly rechristened network's longtime logo.

On April 18, 2011, Quebecor Media launched a new 24-hour news channel, Sun News Network; although Quebecor intended to have Sun News replace CKXT-TV, the company instead replaced the channel's entertainment programming with a simulcast of Sun News Network – which was licensed as a Category C specialty service intended only for distribution by cable and satellite providers – on that date. Quebecor would later voluntarily shut down CKXT on November 1, 2011, amid questioning by the CRTC on the company's usage of the station to simulcast Sun News Network. Sun News eventually ceased operations on February 13, 2015, citing persistently low viewership and the failure to obtain CRTC approval to require mandatory carriage of the channel on domestic pay television providers, and after failed attempts to sell the network to ZoomerMedia (owned by veteran Canadian television executive Moses Znaimer) and Leonard Asper.

CTVglobemedia was then reacquired by Bell Canada in 2011 reorganized as Bell Media. In 2012, however, Bell Media expanded by acquiring Astral Media.

On November 26, 2013, Rogers became the sole television and digital media rightsholder of the National Hockey League Canadian broadcasts that took effect at the start of the 2014–15 season; the deal was valued at $5.2 billion, twice as much as what NBC paid for its own long-term contract with the league in 2011. All Rogers hockey coverage now airs on City, Omni, a group of Sportsnet channels and CBC Television (which signed a four-year deal) through various games including the revamped Hockey Night in Canada.

== See also ==
- 1989 South Florida television affiliation switch
- 1994–1996 United States broadcast television realignment
- 2001 Vancouver TV realignment
- 2006 United States broadcast television realignment
- 2007 in Canadian television
- 2024 Canadian specialty television realignment
