= Media in Victoria, British Columbia =

This is a list of media in Victoria, British Columbia.

== Radio ==
Frequency	Call sign	Branding	Format	Owner	Notes
AM 1070	CFAX	CFAX 1070	news/talk	Bell Media Radio	
FM 88.9	CBUX-FM-1	Ici Musique	public music	Canadian Broadcasting Corporation	French
FM 90.5	CBCV-FM	CBC Radio One	public news/talk	Canadian Broadcasting Corporation	
FM 91.3	CJZN-FM	The Zone	modern rock	Jim Pattison Group	
FM 92.1	CBU-FM-2	CBC Music	public music	Canadian Broadcasting Corporation	
FM 98.5	CIOC-FM	The Ocean	soft adult contemporary	Rogers Communications	
FM 99.7	CBUF-FM-9	Ici Radio-Canada Première	public news/talk	Canadian Broadcasting Corporation	French
FM 100.3	CKKQ-FM	The Q	active rock	Jim Pattison Group	
FM 101.9	CFUV-FM	CFUV	campus radio	University of Victoria	
FM 103.1	CHTT-FM	JACK FM	Adult hits	Rogers Communications	
FM 107.3	CHBE-FM	Virgin Radio	CHR	Bell Media Radio	
FM 107.9	CILS-FM	Radio Victoria	community radio	Société Radio Communautaire Victoria	French

=== Defunct stations ===
- CKMO AM 900 - campus radio station owned by Camosun College; ceased operations March 4, 2012, continuing as an internet-only station.

== Television ==
There are two local stations, two rebroadcasters, and one community channel in Victoria. Victoria is the only Canadian provincial capital without a local CBC Television or Ici Radio-Canada Télé station. The region is considered to be a part of the Vancouver television market, receiving most stations that broadcast from across the Strait of Georgia, including CBUT-DT (CBC Television), CBUFT-DT (Ici Radio-Canada Télé), CIVT-DT (CTV), CHAN-DT (Global), CKVU-DT (Citytv), CHNM-DT (Omni Television), and CHNU-DT (Joytv). As a consequence, Victoria's terrestrial television stations are either independent or associated with Canada's secondary television systems rather than with the main networks.

OTA virtual channel (PSIP)	OTA channel	Shaw Cable	Call Sign	Network	Notes
6.1	16 (UHF)	6	CHEK-DT	Independent	
21.1	21 (UHF)	7	CHNU-DT-1	Joytv	Rebroadcaster of CHNU-DT (Surrey)
27.1	27 (UHF)	13	CKVU-DT-2	Citytv	Rebroadcaster of CKVU-DT (Vancouver)
29.1	29 (UHF)	8	CHNM-DT-1	Omni Television	Rebroadcaster of CHNM-DT (Vancouver)
53.1	23 (UHF)	12	CIVI-DT	CTV 2	
–	–	4	–	Shaw TV	Community channel for Shaw Cable subscribers

See Media in Vancouver for a full list of Vancouver broadcasters.

== Print ==
- Absolute Underground - underground music and culture magazine
- Black Press
- Boulevard Magazine
- Douglas Magazine - Victoria based business magazine
- Goldstream Gazette
- James Bay Beacon
- Lookout - CFB Esquimalt navy base newspaper
- The Martlet - UVic student newspaper
- Monday Magazine
- The Nexus - Camosun College student newspaper
- Oak Bay News
- The Pacific Rim Review of Books - Victoria based book review journal
- Saanich News
- Senior Living - profiling the lives and achievements of the 50+ demographic living in BC
- Sooke News Mirror
- Times Colonist
- Tweed Magazine - Oak Bay lifestyle magazine
- Victoria Magazine
- Victoria News
- Y.A.M. - Victoria's Lifestyle Magazine

== Internet ==
- LoadingReadyRun - sketch comedy website based in Victoria
- Victoria Buzz - Southern Vancouver Island news, events and more
