= List of television stations in British Columbia =

This is a list of broadcast television stations serving cities in the Canadian province of British Columbia.

City of licence	Analog channel	Digital channel	Virtual channel	Callsign	Network	Notes
Chetwynd	55			CHET-TV	Independent	
Cranbrook	5			CFCN-TV-9	CTV	satellite of CFCN-DT Calgary, Alberta
Dawson Creek	5			CJDC-TV	CTV 2	
Fraser Valley		47	66.1	CHNU-DT	Joytv	serves Greater Vancouver and Fraser Valley Currently On Uhf 24
Kamloops	4			CFJC-TV	Citytv	semi-satellite of CKVU-DT Vancouver (except for newscasts)
Kamloops	6			CHKM-TV	Global	satellite of CHAN-DT Vancouver
Kelowna		22	2.1	CHBC-DT	Global	semi-satellite of CHAN-DT Vancouver (except for newscasts)
Kelowna		24	5.1	CHKL-DT	Global	satellite of CHAN-DT Vancouver
Prince George	2			CKPG-TV	Citytv	semi-satellite of CKVU-DT Vancouver (except for newscasts)
Prince George		29	12.1	CIFG-DT	Global	satellite of CHAN-DT Vancouver
Prince Rupert	6			CFTK-TV-1	CTV 2	satellite of CFTK-TV Terrace
Terrace	3			CFTK-TV	CTV 2	
Trail	8			CKTN-TV	Global	satellite of CHAN-DT Vancouver
Valemount	7			CHVC-TV	Independent	
Vancouver		35	2.1	CBUT-DT	CBC	
Vancouver		26	26.1	CBUFT-DT	R-C	
Vancouver		22	8.1	CHAN-DT	Global	
Vancouver		20	42.1	CHNM-DT	Omni	
Vancouver		17	17.1	CIVI-DT-2	CTV Two	Translator of CIVI-DT Victoria
Vancouver		32	32.1	CIVT-DT	CTV	
Vancouver		33	10.1	CKVU-DT	Citytv	
Victoria		16	6.1	CHEK-DT	Independent	
Victoria		29	29.1	CHNM-DT-1	Omni	Translator of CHNM-DT Vancouver
Victoria		21	21.1	CHNU-DT-1	Joytv	Translator of CHNU-DT Fraser Valley
Victoria		23	53.1	CIVI-DT	CTV Two	
Victoria		27	27.1	CKVU-DT-2	Citytv	Translator of CKVU-DT Vancouver

== See also ==
- List of television stations in Canada
- Media in Canada
