= List of programs broadcast by Joytv =

The following is a list of programs broadcast by Joytv, a regional multiple faith-based television system consisting of two stations in the Canadian provinces of British Columbia (CHNU-DT) and Manitoba (CIIT-DT, now branded Faith TV) that also carries syndicated reruns of family-oriented mainstream programming.

== Currently broadcast by CHNU ==
=== Faith ===
- The 700 Club Canada
- Kenneth Copeland Ministries
- The Key to the Kingdom
- Life Today with James Robison
- Mehak Punjab Di
- Peter Popoff Ministries
- Tribal Trails
