= Television in Canada =

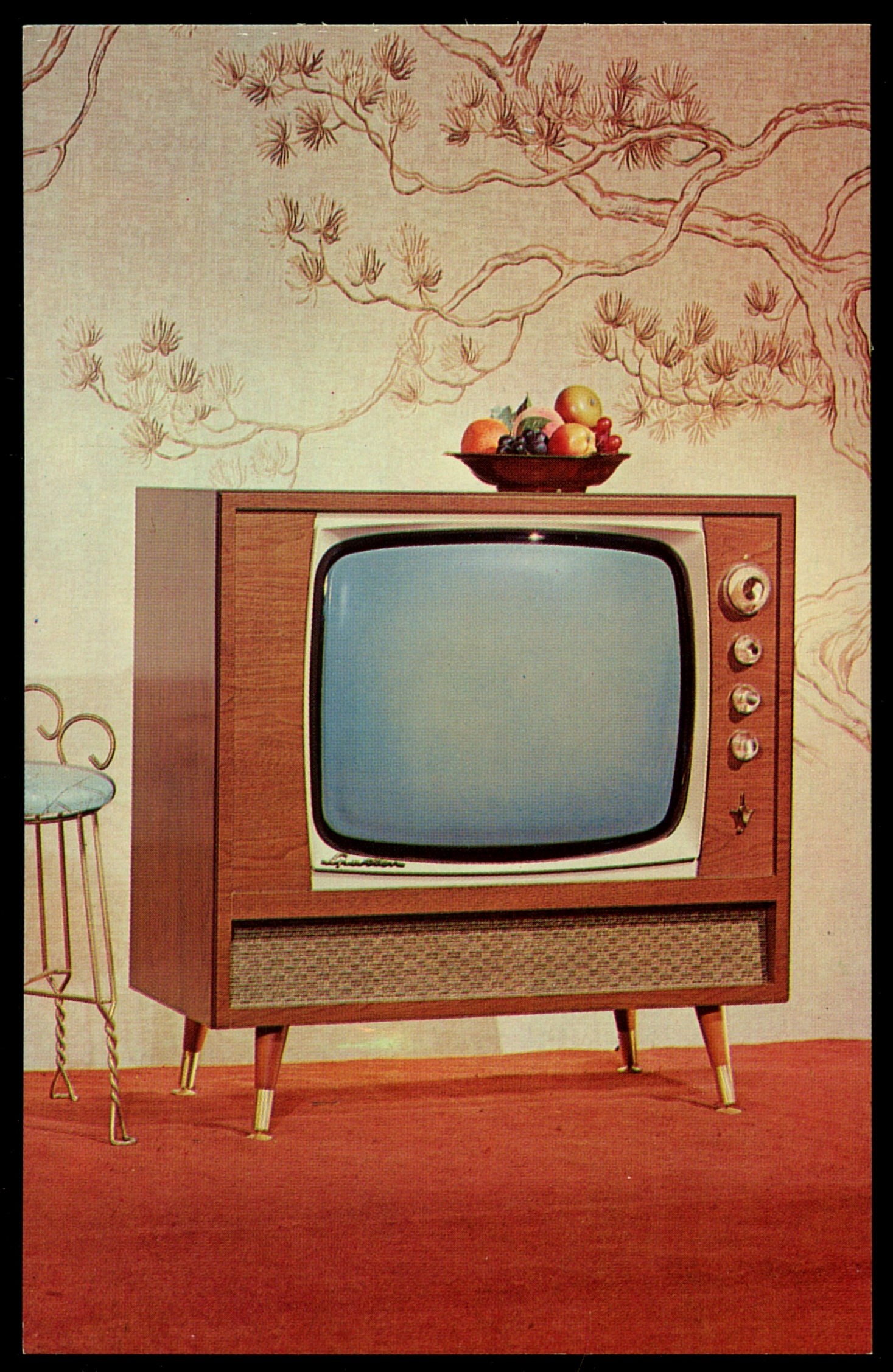
Sparton "Kingsway" television set (model 23L1T), c. 1965 produced in Canada

Television in Canada officially began with the sign-on of the nation's first television stations in Montreal and Toronto in 1952. As with most media in Canada, the television industry, and the television programming available in that country, are strongly influenced by media in the United States and the United Kingdom, perhaps to an extent not seen in any other major industrialized nation. As a result, the government institutes quotas for "Canadian content". Nonetheless, new content is often aimed at a broader North American audience, although the similarities may be less pronounced in the predominantly French-language province of Quebec.

== History ==
=== Development of television ===
The first experimental television broadcast began in 1932 in Montreal, Quebec, under the call sign of VE9EC. The broadcasts of VE9EC were broadcast in 60 to 150 lines of resolution on 41 MHz. This service closed around 1935, and the outbreak of World War II put a halt to television experiments. Television in Canada on major networks pre-date any telecasts that originated in the country as thousands of television sets that were capable of receiving U.S.-based signals were installed in homes near the Canada–US border between 1946 and 1953. Homes in southern and southwestern Ontario and portions of British Columbia, including the Toronto, Hamilton, London, Windsor, Victoria and Vancouver areas, were able to receive television stations from Buffalo, Cleveland, Detroit or Seattle with the help of elevated outdoor antennas and amplifiers. U.S. television programs and the networks that originated them thus became popular in those Canadian cities within range of their signals, and those cities represented a sizeable proportion of the total Canadian population. This helped spur development of a specifically Canadian television programming and transmission system during the late 1940s and early 1950s, but at the same time caused it to develop within American technical standards that had been previously mandated by the Federal Communications Commission between 1941 and 1946.

Since the first Canadian stations (CBFT in Montreal and CBLT in Toronto) signed on in September 1952, television developed differently in Canada than in the United States because it was introduced and developed in a different context. The distinct social, political, and economic situation of Canada shaped the historic development of mass communication and television in the country. Three factors have made the historical development of television in Canada a unique one: The threat of American influence, the language divide, and the government's response to both of these.

American influence and the fear of that influence greatly affected television's development in Canada. The first decades of the 20th century saw a change towards industrialization, and during that time both the materials and products manufactured as well as the investors and consumers were American. The Canadian dependency on American capital and markets persisted through the Great Depression and its aftermath. This situation remained during the emergence of television and affected its development in Canada. Even with the emergence of radio, Canada was already trying to keep foreign ownership and programming at a minimum to avoid the American imperialism that would be caused by such dependency on the United States, which in fact was already incipient.

The issue of economy of scale played a large role. "Americans [were] pushing smaller cultural communication aside with their dominating programming, not because they [were] based on a policy but because they ha[d] the money – the poorer the country, the more American productions." English Canadian broadcasting illustrated how this was problematic for some Anglophone Canadians as well as the Canadian government. A major question was how any sense of "Canadianism" could come out of such an attractive (and rich) American world. There was a fear of communicating ideas and opinions that were not Canadian, to Canadians - especially the youth. With the exception of radio, television presented an opportunity, for the first time, to reach a very wide audience at the same time. By 1954, a million television sets had been sold in Canada. Even though those sets were very expensive at the time, the large majority (9 of 10) of Canadian households owned a television set by the end of the 1950s.

People became excited and obsessed with the novelty. Television performer and producer Lorne Michaels said, about the advent of television, "it was all we talked about at school. We literally raced home to watch TV". It became important to Canada that Canadian values would be projected onto this large audience and then onto the entire nation. Although many watched the available American television programs, some feared that Canada would end up stuck in a rut of American popular culture during a time when Canadian national identity was very vague. Canada was not only made up of Francophones and Anglophones, there were also immigrants from around the world, at that time mostly from Europe. That fear of American influence convinced the Canadian government that its involvement was necessary in order for Canadian broadcasting to express and encourage Canadian identity and national unity.

Though French-speaking Canadians feared expansion of American influence and the difficulties that might arise in protecting the French language, inexpensive imported U.S. programs, which filled the schedules of many English language Canadian TV channels, were not attractive to French-speaking audiences. In this situation, society affected the division in the Canadian broadcasting industry as much as the division affected society. The intensity of fears of "continentalism" was as strong as its opposing force of attractiveness of American television programs to Canadian viewers. Most Anglophone viewers could relate easily to the American programs as much as they did to their Canadian programs, since people spoke the same language as they did. For example, in 1957, the Canadian Broadcasting Corporation presented American programs such as The Ed Sullivan Show. However, the ten most popular programs on French-language television were made in Quebec, including La Famille Plouffe. Gradually, French Canadians showed a strong preference for Quebec-produced television programs, which was significant considering the fierce American competition that English Canada dealt with (and still deals with to this day). French-language television was distinct from English-language television in that "one of its most distinctive aspects was the bringing together of international and local influences, American and European television styles and programming ideas and merging them with the cultural idioms of rapidly modernizing and assertive Quebec." The merging of local and foreign ideas and techniques was a novelty in North American television. Since English and French language television in Canada had developed separately, French-language broadcasting developed a distinct popular culture.

With the fear of the United States stunting the growth of Canada as well as the country becoming increasingly divided by language, the government showed huge concern with how television affected Canadians. Graham Spry, founder and spokesperson of the Canadian Radio League, stated about the radio system: "The question is the State or the United States." According to the Canadian government, the survival of Canadian television depended on public funding for Canadian programs, which would be produced, broadcast and controlled by a public corporation. The Broadcasting Act of 1932 began of government involvement. Its main aim was the "Canadianization of mass media". In other words, it wanted to create a Canadian broadcasting system to replace the American system that had infiltrated itself into Canada, as well as to unite Canadians in creating a national identity. The Broadcasting Act of 1932 created a national network for each electronic medium in Canada's two official languages, French and English. When it was created, the Act referred mostly to radio broadcasting but it also included television once TV came to the country in 1952.

The Act resulted in the creation of the CRBC, which would be replaced by the Canadian Broadcasting Corporation (CBC) in a later revision. The government-created corporation held the responsibility of establishing a national service and to monitor the entire broadcast system. Because of Canada's large land area, it would be difficult for one corporation to control the broadcasting system throughout the country, all while establishing a network to compete in that system as well as in the American system. Before 1958, Canadian law prohibited the creation of private television networks. Private stations did emerge but could not exist independently, and were obliged to become affiliated with the French national network or the English national network. The Act of 1958 as well as its revised version in 1968 allowed for the existence of privatized networks. The private stations were then recognized as direct competitors to the CBC, which maintained its role as national broadcaster but lost its regulatory power.

The 1968 Broadcasting Act created the Canadian Radio-Television Commission (now the Canadian Radio-Television and Telecommunications Commission). The government still referred to the Canadian broadcasting system as the "single system". Among other concerns, this implied that both private and public networks were working toward the same goals, notably the national objective of unity and Canadian content and ownership. Government intervention helped the Canadian broadcasting industry economically but failed to create a distinct culture that was in sharp contrast to American popular culture. However, it did allow Quebec to run its own broadcasting service and economically, it helped out the Canadian broadcasters, particularly the Canadian Association of Broadcasters (CAB). Due to their protests, Bill C-58 was passed. Among many changes, Bill C-58 removed tax deductibility benefits for Canadian Corporations advertising on American stations. The 1968 Act had also given priority carriage for Canadian broadcast services.

Policies such as these produced important economic benefits for Canadian broadcasters. Economic prosperity for Canadian broadcasters took priority over Canadian identity in that prosperity was not compromised for identity. This can be inferred through the vagueness and ineffective policies passed in the aim of protecting Canadian culture. For example, Canadian content regulations were introduced in 1959 and revised again in 1978. "Canadian content" is broadly defined as programs of "general interest to Canadians". Since Canadians easily identify with Americans and their popular culture as well as the two countries being tied very closely on an economic standpoint, almost anything produced in the U.S. could be considered to be of general interest to Canadians. Changes to this were attempted in the late 1980s. Government intervention throughout the development of television in Canada affected the way it was developed domestically as it developed through laws and policies rather than a free market.

=== Broadcast television ===
While American television stations, including affiliates of ABC, NBC and CBS, near the Canada–US border were available for several years prior, and gained a sizeable audience in cities like Toronto, within range of U.S. signals, the Canadian Broadcasting Corporation (CBC) was the first entity to broadcast television programming within Canada, launching in September 1952 in both Montreal and Toronto. Private CBC affiliates began operating late in 1953 to supplement the corporation's own stations; the first private CBC affiliate in Canada was CKSO-TV in Sudbury, Ontario in October of that year, with CFPL-TV in London, Ontario following a few weeks later. All television stations that signed on in Canada were required to be CBC affiliates, as the CBC was the only television network operating in Canada at the time.

In 1948, there were 325 television sets in Canada, but thousands more were sold in the years from 1948 to 1952, most of them tuned to stations from either the Buffalo, Seattle, Cleveland or Detroit television markets. When Canadian television began, the Radio-Television Manufacturers Association of Canada estimated that 85,000 sets were expected to be sold in 1952. 95% of these were concentrated in Ontario, with 57.4% in the Golden Horseshoe region (40.2% in Toronto and Hamilton, 17.2% in Niagara Peninsula) and 34.6% in the Windsor region near Detroit. Television viewership outside Ontario was limited to British Columbia's Lower Mainland with access to American programming from Seattle and some sets in Montreal. Television sales were promoted not only by the arrival of CBC Television, but by revised credit practices at that time, which allowed purchases without requiring an initial cash deposit.

Following a review by the Diefenbaker government in the late 1950s, a number of new, "second" stations were licensed in many major markets, many of which began operating before the end of 1960. CTV, the first private network, which grew out of the inevitable association of these new stations, began operating in October 1961. About the same time, CHCH-TV in Hamilton disaffiliated from the CBC and became the first station not affiliated with either network, not counting the initial launch period of most of the soon-to-be CTV stations.

Over the next 25 years or so, many more new stations were launched, primarily CBC stations in major markets replacing private affiliates (which subsequently joined with CTV or became independent) and new independent stations in the largest centres, such as CITY-TV in Toronto, CITV-TV in Edmonton, and CKND-TV in Winnipeg. During this time cable television also began to take hold, securing the fortunes of individuals such as Ted Rogers, who secured the licences for much of Toronto.

In 1966, CHCH in Hamilton formed the nucleus of the first serious attempt to form Canada's third terrestrial television network. The original plan was withdrawn for regulatory and financial reasons by 1969, but a scaled-down version resulted in the 1974 launch of CKGN-TV in Toronto, whose branding as Global Television Network would eventually extend nationwide. Through the 1970s and 1980s, nearly every major Canadian market saw the launch of independent third stations, most of which were either launched by or eventually acquired by Izzy Asper's Canwest, and which served as a de facto third network although they were not yet branded or formally structured as such; these stations, by and large, were eventually unified as the Global Television Network.

The 1980s and 1990s saw exponential growth in the multichannel universe, beginning with pay television services and later continuing with various waves of specialty services, usually launched in one fell swoop. The launch of direct-to-home satellite television services in the mid-1990s accelerated this growth.

The early- to mid-1990s in particular also saw further growth and consolidation of broadcast television. Baton Broadcasting, owner of Toronto CTV affiliate CFTO-TV and already seen as the network's dominant player, bought or replaced most of the network's other affiliates and ultimately acquired the network itself. In 1997, Asper's regional networks became united under the Global Television Network brand previously used only by his Ontario station.

Additional groups also sprouted up in the form of Western International Communications, CHUM Limited and Craig Media. In 2000, CanWest bought WIC, which had itself grown from the CTV affiliate-owner in British Columbia to include many of the stations of Allarcom and Maclean Hunter, in order to satisfy its long-held desire to enter Alberta, but also giving it a second network. CHUM secured two regional services in Ontario before expanding to British Columbia and merging with Craig, its equivalent in the Canadian Prairies.

The early 2000s, aside from the completion of the consolidation described above, brought an apparent convergence craze among the major media conglomerates. CanWest bought the Southam newspaper chain, including the leading broadsheet papers in several major cities, raising new concerns on media concentration. Telecom giant BCE, believing it needed control over content to fuel its new media strategy, formed Bell Globemedia, essentially CTV and its specialty services put together with a single, if influential, newspaper, The Globe and Mail. Canwest continues to pursue its strategy; in late 2005, BCE announced it would sell most of its interests in Globemedia to a consortium of investors including the Thomson family and Torstar, although it still retains a minority stake in the company.

In many respects, particularly since the consolidation phase of the late 1990s and early 2000s the television industry in Canada now more closely resembles the British or Australian models, in which the vast majority of stations are directly owned by their networks and offer only slight variance in local scheduling apart from local or regional newscasts, rather than the American network affiliate model that formerly predominated. In some cases, in fact, a single station serves an entire province (or even multiple provinces, in the case of the Maritimes) through a network of rebroadcasters rather than through multiple licensed stations. Some privately owned network affiliates do still exist, although these are now relatively rare and exist only in smaller television markets.

=== Recent developments ===
Bell Globemedia (soon after renamed CTVglobemedia and then Bell Media) announced plans to acquire CHUM Limited, in a deal that would place Canada's four largest private English-language broadcast services under just two owners (in CTVgm's case, CTV and Citytv). The enlarged CTVgm would also own interests in nearly 40 specialty channels and pay services. As part of the proposal, CTVgm would sell several of CHUM's less valuable properties, such as the smaller A-Channel system, to Rogers Communications, Canada's largest cable provider and already a major media company in its own right. On June 8, 2007, however, the CRTC approved the CHUM merger, conditional on CTV divesting itself of Citytv rather than A-Channel.

This sparked another round of media consolidation. In early 2007, Canwest, in partnership with Goldman Sachs, announced an agreement to buy Alliance Atlantis, another major specialty channel operator, and more deals are expected in the near future. Other major specialty operators include Corus Entertainment (owned by the Shaw family) and Channel Zero.

Consolidation has also continued between cable companies, and between specialty channel operators. There are now few of the small family-owned television groups that dominated the formative era of Canadian television, the most notable perhaps being the Stirling family, which owns NTV in St. John's, Newfoundland and Labrador. The twinstick model of broadcasting, in which a single locally owned company operated both CTV and CBC affiliates in a community, is also now rare – within English Canada, only the cities of Thunder Bay and Lloydminster still receive television service from a twinstick operation, and of those two, only Thunder Bay's Thunder Bay Television is still locally owned.

In 2012, Bell Media attempted to acquire Astral Media in a takeover. This initial attempt was rejected by the CRTC as this would have resulted in Bell increasing its share of the Canadian broadcasting market to 42%. Bell filed a new application for the proposed takeover with the CRTC on March 6, 2013, two days after the Competition Bureau approved the acquisition; the Commission approved the merger on June 27, 2013, with Bell volunteering to sell certain cable television properties including Family Channel, Disney XD, MusiMax, MusiquePlus and Historia as well as Astral's interest in Teletoon, in an attempt to relieve concerns surrounding Bell's total market share in English-language television following the merger (most of the properties were sold to Corus Entertainment – which already owned Teletoon and its related children's specialty channels – although Remstar acquired MusiMax and MusiquePlus and DHX Media acquired Family Channel and its sister channels).

== Television programming ==
As outlined below, Canadian regulations ensure that the majority of programming aired by Canadian stations are of domestic origin. However, thanks to domestic newscasts and daytime programming, a very large percentage of the airtime in peak viewing hours (in most areas, 7:00 to 11:00 p.m.) can be devoted to programs of foreign origin, in large part due to the significant amount of programming available from the U.S., not to mention the availability of the major U.S. broadcast networks themselves via cable or satellite, or even as terrestrial signals in border markets.

A Canadian network is allowed to override the cable or satellite feed of an American broadcast signal when they air the same program simultaneously, ensuring that the Canadian broadcaster, not the American broadcaster, is able to benefit from the advertising revenue associated with broadcasting to the Canadian audience. Arguably this right has led to an even greater glut of American programming on Canadian stations, including programs of little relevance to Canadian audiences, or poorly received series that may never be seen outside North America. In addition, higher rated American shows cannot be seen if the Canadian network overriding the signal interrupts the program for a news bulletin, unless the cable company switches the signal back to the American station's feed.

=== Scheduling ===
Many Canadian broadcasters broadcast on a 24-hour schedule. Daily programming begins at about 6:00 a.m., usually with a local or national morning show. Daytime programming, including talk shows and soap operas, follows, although some Canadian stations may air "brokered-time" religious or charitable programming as well, which unlike traditional infomercials can count towards Canadian content requirements.

Most Canadian television stations are required to carry some news programming as per their licence. As opposed to the U.S. model, most stations, even in major markets like Toronto, carry a single newscast during the late-afternoon/early-evening period, specifically from 6:00 to 7:00 p.m. However, as in the U.S., "strip" programming fills the following hour, at least in the Eastern and Pacific time zones, and is followed by prime time programming. One or more newscasts follow, usually beginning at 11:00 p.m.; the main exception is The National, which airs at 10:00 p.m. on CBC. However, there is a growing trend of some television stations adopting a newscast schedule similar to the American television model, with locally produced newscasts in the mornings (usually lasting about 3 to 3½ hours and airing only on weekdays, though a few stations do carry weekend morning newscasts) and during the lunch hour, in addition to early and late-evening newscasts; most owned-and-operated stations of Global nationwide and most CTV O&Os located west of the Ontario/Manitoba border have adopted this scheduling format for their local news programming. In contrast, some stations carry a locally produced morning news programs even if they do not carry evening newscasts at all (such as City's owned-and-operated stations, all of which produce a weekday morning news/talk program using the title Breakfast Television; the television system's Toronto flagship CITY-DT is the only Citytv O&O, as well as one of only three stations affiliated with the network, to carry nightly locally produced evening newscasts).

To maximize simultaneous substitution opportunities, in the Eastern and Pacific Time Zones, prime time programming airs from 8:00 to 11:00 p.m., while in the Central Time Zone it generally airs from 7:00 to 10:00 p.m., in both cases mirroring the U.S. networks. However, viewers in the Mountain Time Zone – i.e. Alberta – have historically received U.S. network feeds from the Pacific Time Zone, not from the Mountain Time Zone. Similarly, those in Atlantic Canada receive U.S. feeds from the Eastern Time Zone. Local stations in those regions also use 8:00 to 11:00 p.m. (8:30 to 11:30 p.m. in Newfoundland and Southeast Labrador) as prime time, but with most programming advanced by an hour (thus programming seen from 8:00 to 10:00 p.m. in the Eastern and Pacific Time Zones is typically seen from 9:00 to 11:00 p.m. in the Atlantic and Mountain Time Zones (9:30 to 11:30 p.m. Newfoundland Time)), and 10:00 p.m. programming aired earlier in the evening at 8:00 p.m. (8:30 p.m. Newfoundland Time). Also, in the rare event a program scheduled to start before 10:00 p.m. in the Eastern and/or Pacific Time Zones runs into the 10:00 p.m. hour, Atlantic and Mountain Time Zone stations will typically delay their 11:00 p.m. news programming to 12:00 a.m. and air the entire program in unison with the time zone directly west (thus, a program scheduled to air from 9:00 to 11:00 p.m. in Eastern and Pacific Time Zones is typically aired from 10:00 p.m. to 12:00 a.m. in the Atlantic and Mountain Time Zones (10:30 p.m. to 12:30 a.m. Newfoundland Time), with syndicated programming airing in the 8:00 p.m. hour).

CBC Television airs all programming corresponding to the local time zone, except for a 30-minute delay in the Newfoundland Time Zone.

Overnight programming varies from broadcaster to broadcaster, and may consist of purchased programming or infomercials, or repeat airings of daytime programming.

=== Canadian content ===
As of 2003 three quarters of English-Canadian television shows on prime time were from the United States. While under Canadian Radio-television and Telecommunications Commission regulations at least 60% of program has to be Canadian-produced, and 50% during prime time, English-language private broadcasters such as CTV and Global have always had difficulty airing more than a bare minimum of Canadian-produced programming in primetime; in actual practice, network and local news accounts for a large proportion of the Canadian content on most stations, with each of the commercial networks rarely having more than one or two Canadian-produced drama or comedy series on their schedules at any given time. Among the English language broadcasters, only the public CBC Television airs a schedule that consists almost entirely of Canadian-produced programming, although even it will sometimes air selected programming from Britain, Australia or PBS (American Public Television) in the United States.

American television programs are much more profitable for English Canadian networks than domestic ones. A Canadian House of Commons Standing Committee on Canadian Heritage report found that networks lost $125,000 per hour of English-language Canadian drama, but made a profit of $275,000 per hour of American drama. Scripted television programming in Canada tends toward the shorter runs more typical of British television rather than the longer seasons that predominate in the United States. A typical Canadian drama or comedy series will produce between six and thirteen episodes in its first season, although an exceptionally popular series such as Corner Gas may produce up to 20 episodes in later seasons. A slight deviation from this model is with the long-running teen drama Degrassi: The Next Generation (the fourth iteration of the popular Degrassi franchise), which due to a switch to a more serialized format in 2011, began producing up to 40 episodes per season. Less expensive forms of programming, such as news and sketch comedy programs, will usually produce many more episodes each year, coming closer to the American model.

The French-language commercial networks air significantly more Canadian content than their English counterparts, and domestic programming is far more popular than imports. As of 2003 the top ten shows on television in Quebec were written and created by Quebecers. The Standing Committee report found that Canadian French networks made a profit of $40,000 per hour of French-language drama, compared to $10,000 per hour of American drama. The Quebec television industry produced two and one half times more TV series per capita than American networks.

== Languages ==
While the majority of services operate in English, there are a growing number of similar services in the French language, serving primarily Quebec. Ici Radio-Canada Télé, the French-language equivalent of CBC Television, broadcasts terrestrially across Canada, while TVA, one of Quebec's two commercial French-language networks, is available across Canada on satellite and cable.

RDI, the French equivalent of CBC News Network, also has cross-Canada cable carriage rights, as does TV5 Québec Canada. Most other French-language networks are available only in Quebec, although some have optional cable carriage status in the rest of Canada. V, for instance, is carried on cable in New Brunswick and parts of Ontario and is available nationally by satellite.

The Ontario government's French public television network TFO is the only French-language broadcaster in Canada whose operations are located entirely outside of Quebec.

Other ethnic and multicultural services, serving one or more cultural groups outside of these two official languages, are also growing in strength. Six terrestrial TV stations, CFMT and CJMT in Toronto, CFHD in Montreal, CJEO in Edmonton, CJCO in Calgary and CHNM in Vancouver, air multicultural programming in a variety of languages, while Telelatino airs programming in Italian and Spanish on basic cable. Numerous third-language channels have been licensed as Category 2 services on digital cable.

The Aboriginal Peoples Television Network (APTN) airs programming targeted to the Indigenous peoples of Canada; 28 per cent of the network's content is broadcast in aboriginal languages.

== Business and regulation of television ==
The Canadian broadcasting industry, including all programming services (over-the-air or otherwise) and all distributors, is regulated in regards to ownership and content by the Canadian Radio-television and Telecommunications Commission (CRTC), which in most cases issues licences for each such operation. The CRTC issues licences pursuant to Canadian laws and the commission's own regulations and conditions of licence, which regulate such matters as Canadian content, domestic ownership and accessibility issues such as closed captioning.

Among other regulations, all Canadian broadcasters and distributors must be at least 80% owned and controlled by Canadian citizens; also, all conventional stations, and most established specialty services, are required to air a majority of Canadian content, both throughout its schedule and in its primetime schedule.

Industry Canada regulates the technical aspects of broadcast stations and certain aspects of other licensed undertakings.

=== Broadcast television ===
Unlike specialty services, conventional (or over-the-air) broadcast stations are permitted to air a wide variety of news, information, entertainment, sports and other programming without any restriction as to theme or content, and none restrict themselves in that regard. Religious television stations are an exception to the previous statement but must provide a variety of programs reflecting different points of view. CRTC regulations have so far prevented a large number of the infomercial- or religious-based stations now frequently found in major centres in the U.S. from operating in Canada; infomercials, even those made in Canada, are not considered Canadian content.

Nearly all broadcast stations have now been aligned, in one form or another, into national groups based on ownership and/or content. Many of these groups are designated as "networks", in the colloquial sense, below, although in the regulatory sense they may or may not be licensed networks. However, they are often treated very differently from U.S. networks. For instance, most networks provide a full slate of programming, often, but not always, buying the national rights to "syndicated" programs that air across affiliates of multiple American networks. In Canada, hence Dr. Phil and The Ellen DeGeneres Show only air on CTV stations, and Entertainment Tonight only on Global stations. However, for historical reasons, The Oprah Winfrey Show (until it ended its run in 2011) aired on a mixture of stations, albeit one dominated by CTV.

Also, it is not uncommon to find multiple affiliates of one network, and no affiliates of another network, available in the same market on basic cable, particularly in smaller markets. For instance, in Kingston, Ontario, two CBC affiliates are available, a local privately owned station and a CBC-owned station from Ottawa, while CTV 2 is not available in that market. In many markets, including some major cities, there is only a handful of local stations, with other network services provided by an affiliate based hundreds of kilometres away. For instance, in Ottawa, only three English networks/systems – CBC, CTV and CTV Two – have stations based in the market; the "local" Global and Citytv stations are in fact rebroadcasters of Toronto-area stations. Such a scenario would be virtually unheard of in a major American market.

Despite a general CRTC policy that limits station ownership to one station per market per language per company, several exceptions have led to twinstick operations in several markets. In some cases, this allows multiple stations to serve a small market that could otherwise support only one station.

In larger markets, however, Canwest and CHUM had justified several instances of twinsticks, generally two stations based in separate but neighbouring regions. This was allowed on the basis that, in another owner's hands, stations like CHCH in Hamilton, Ontario and CHEK in Victoria, British Columbia (both Canwest stations that were sold off in 2009, CHCH to Channel Zero and CHEK to a consortium of the station's employees) would inevitably turn their focus to the larger Toronto and Vancouver markets respectively, leaving their cities of licence with little or no local news coverage. This led to the development of the respective E! and A (now CTV Two) systems. Nonetheless, the local news coverage these stations provide do not prevent them from airing programs with mass appeal during the rest of their schedules, frequently promoted on their sister stations.

All stations have call signs beginning in "CB", "CF", "CH", "CI", "CJ" or "CK", but few now use them. While Industry Canada nominally maintains a requirement for stations to identify themselves every hour on the hour, in practice this is rarely enforced. Meanwhile, the major networks have striven to minimize the costs associated with multiple brand names. Some newer call signs are rarely known outside the industry (such as CKXT or "Sun TV"), while the major networks have largely removed all traces of formerly well-known call signs on local stations or their websites. A notable if partial exception is CITY-DT in Toronto, which, along with several sister stations, use the Citytv brand name.

==== Networks, systems and groups ====
The publicly funded CBC operates two broadcast networks, CBC Television and Ici Radio-Canada Télé, respectively operating in English and French. Both are devoted primarily to domestic content, albeit with different programming: the French-language service, which does not have significant foreign competition, has been considered a major success in recent years, while many have found much to be desired on its English counterpart over the same time. The English network in particular has suffered immensely due to various cuts to, and restructurings of, the CBC's budget, beginning in the late 1980s, as well as greater competition with private broadcasters, both domestic and foreign, in English Canada. Both networks are available over-the-air in most of the country.

The first tier of national private networks include CTV, Global, Citytv and TVA. CTV, Citytv and Global are English networks, which generally split the most popular foreign programs between them, with significant local news programming in most areas but limited amounts of domestic content in primetime. Both CTV and Global are available over-the-air in most regions; Citytv is available in virtually all of Canada's major media markets, but has only partial coverage in other areas. Much like CTV and Global, Citytv originally focused on movies and niche-appeal programs in primetime, although it has gradually added more series of broader appeal, despite lacking a presence in Atlantic Canada. TVA, a French-language network available throughout Quebec over-the-air and elsewhere via cable and satellite, airs mostly programming made in Quebec, to great success in that province; see also Quebec television. CTV, Global, Citytv and TVA are respectively owned by Bell Canada through its Bell Media division, Corus Entertainment, Rogers Communications through its Rogers Media division and Quebecor Media.

The remaining networks or systems have a more limited reach or audience appeal. As the CRTC is much more conservative in licensing individual stations than the FCC, they do not reach all markets; in fact CTV Two consists almost entirely of former CBC affiliates that disaffiliated from CBC Television and quickly turned their focus towards larger nearby markets.

These networks include:

- CTV 2, a secondary service owned by CTV.
- Noovo, a French-language network owned by Bell Media; availability in Quebec is roughly equal to that of TVA but availability outside of Quebec is limited.
- APTN, a non-profit Aboriginal service carried primarily via cable.
- Omni Television, a system of five multicultural stations owned by Rogers Communications. These stations also air syndicated programming.
- Joytv, a system of two religious stations owned by S-VOX, which were sold by Rogers and were formerly part of the Omni Television system.
- Yes TV, a system of three religious-based stations owned by Crossroads Christian Communications.

Many smaller markets have stations that receive programming from more than one network. Most notably, CJON-DT (or "NTV") in St. John's, Newfoundland and Labrador airs CTV's newscasts along with its own locally produced NTV Evening Newshour, but relies mainly on Global for entertainment programs.

Some markets have at least one provincial educational service available, namely TVOntario and TFO (Ontario), Télé-Québec and Canal SAVOIR (Quebec), Citytv Saskatchewan (Saskatchewan), Knowledge Network (British Columbia), and CTV 2 Alberta (Alberta). Of these, all except CTV 2 Alberta and Citytv Saskatchewan are owned by governmental or nonprofit agencies; CTV Two Alberta is owned by Bell Media and Citytv Saskatchewan by Rogers Communications, and both serve as educational broadcasters during the day while offering the programming of one of Canada's commercial television networks or systems in prime time.

Other major stations include CFHD-DT, a multicultural independent station in Montreal airing programs in various foreign languages; CJIL-TV (or "The Miracle Channel," in southern Alberta); and locally owned independent station CHEK-DT in Victoria, British Columbia.

A number of American stations, such as independent station KVOS-TV in Bellingham, Washington, and the Fox affiliates in Buffalo, New York (WUTV) and Burlington, Vermont (WFFF), have also aggressively courted Canadian advertisers and are perceived by many viewers and advertisers as effectively Canadian stations.

=== Multichannel television ===
Cable and satellite television services are available throughout Canada, delivering local and often regional stations, the major U.S. networks, and additional programming via specialty and other non-broadcast channels. The largest cable providers are Rogers Cable, Shaw Cable, Vidéotron, Telus and Cogeco, while the two licensed satellite providers are Bell Satellite TV and Shaw Direct.

Specialty channels, unlike cable networks in the U.S., must be licensed by the CRTC. They must be focused on a specific genre and cannot include general-interest services of akin to American services TNT or USA Network; as a result programs from these U.S. channels often end up on conventional stations, not cable. Specialty channels include such categories as sports (such as TSN and Sportsnet), news (such as CBC News Network and CTV News Channel), music (such as Much and CMT), arts (such as CTV Drama Channel), kids and family (such as Teletoon, YTV, and Treehouse), drama (such as Showcase), factual (such as History and Discovery), and lifestyle. Anglophone premium television services include The Movie Network (which serves areas east of the Ontario–Manitoba border), Movie Central (which serves areas west of that border), Super Channel (which is available nationally), and Super Écran (which serves French-speaking Canadiens).

Some U.S. channels are also available, although these are also subject to CRTC approval. Aside from the four main broadcast networks, they are generally prohibited if a similar Canadian channel has already launched at the time of the request for Canadian carriage. American cable networks have occasionally been removed outright if an equivalent Canadian channel is licensed, as in the case of CMT.

=== Internet television ===
Internet television in Canada includes streaming services from both local and international companies. Along with international services such as Netflix, Amazon Prime Video, Disney+ and others, majors local providers includes Crave, CBC Gem, ICI Tou.TV and Illico+.

== Technology ==
In Canada, over-the-air television signals are primarily broadcast using the NTSC (analogue) and ATSC (digital) formats. The CRTC set August 31, 2011, as the deadline for full-power over-the-air television transmitters broadcasting in 28 mandatory markets to move to digital transmission; as a result, the ATSC digital standard has become the primary means of transmitting over-the-air broadcast signals in Canada.

Canada has not announced any further over-the-air digital conversion deadlines. Permits for new analogue television transmitters are no longer being granted.

In April 2017, it was announced by Industry Canada that all remaining analogue over-the-air television signals across Canada are scheduled to be shut down no later than 2022.

== TV ratings ==
Position	Channel	Share of total viewing (%)	Weekly use (at least three days) of English news channel (%)	Weekly use (at least three days) of French news channel (%)
1	Global	5.4	31(19)	-
2	CTV	4.9	33(23)	-
3	Citytv	4.1	15(8)	-
4	TVA	3.5	-	59(48)
5	Noovo (V)	3.3	-	10(4)
6	CBC	3.1	31(18)	-
7	Ici R-C	2.4	-	49(35)
8	Yes TV	1.9	-	-
9	CTV 2	1.6	-	-
10	CTV Sci-Fi	1.4	-	-
11	CP24	-	15(12)	-

== See also ==
- List of television stations in Canada by call sign
- List of Canadian television channels
- List of years in Canadian television
- Canadian science fiction television
- Canadian television awards
- Lists of Canadian television series
- List of defunct Canadian television stations
- Sports broadcasting contracts in Canada
