= VisionTV =

Canadian specialty television channel

- Country: Canada
- Broadcast area: National
- Headquarters: Toronto, Ontario

Programming
- Picture format: 1080i (HDTV) (2017–present); 480i (SDTV) (1988–present)

Ownership
- Owner: S-VOX Foundation (1998–2009); ZoomerMedia (2009–present)

History
- Launched: September 1, 1988, 36 years ago

Links
- Website: VisionTV

VisionTV is a Canadian English language Category A specialty channel that broadcasts multi-faith, multicultural, and general entertainment programming aimed at the 45 and over demographic.

VisionTV is currently owned by ZoomerMedia, a company operated by Moses Znaimer. VisionTV's funding comes from cable subscription fees, viewer donations, advertising revenues and the sale of airtime to faith groups.

== History and viewership ==
Licensed in December 1987 by the Canadian Radio-television and Telecommunications Commission (CRTC), the channel was launched on September 1, 1988 under the ownership of a nonprofit organization that eventually evolved into S-VOX. It was initially one of Canada's more popular cable channels. However, with the proliferation of new cable channels, it has been moved up the dial by carriers and become less available to audiences, causing a drop in its viewership. VisionTV lacked clout with cable carriers as it was then a one-channel operation owned by a not-for-profit organization rather than a large commercial entity operating many channels.

Notably, Rogers Cable was criticized in 1997 for moving Vision to Channel 59 on its Toronto system, rendering it inaccessible to many apartment residents because 59 is the channel most commonly overridden by the lobby camera service in apartment buildings. After Vision protested, Rogers offered to put Vision on channel 78 as well, but Vision turned that down because many of its viewers' sets can't reach that far.

Network vice-president Rita Deverell, who hosted interstitial segments between programs, was the network's most prominent on-air personality from its launch until she left in 2002 to work for APTN.

In June 2009, S-VOX announced it would sell its broadcasting assets to ZoomerMedia, a company controlled by Moses Znaimer. The sale was approved by the CRTC on March 30, 2010. ZoomerMedia assumed control of S-VOX's broadcasting assets on June 30, 2010.

In December 2010, ZoomerMedia introduced a new logo and on-air identity for the channel with the tagline, "Zoomer Television," emphasizing its focus on more general entertainment programming for the 45 and older demographic. While Znaimer promoted "Zoomer" as a term he coined, defining it in a press release as "Boomers With Zip," the word predates his use, with documented appearances in Canadian and American media as early as 2000; Merriam-Webster also notes the word was used to describe particularly active Baby Boomers independently of Znaimer's coinage claim.

In August 2013, the Canadian Radio-television Telecommunications Commission (CRTC) denied Vision's application to continue mandatory carriage which had required all Canadian cable systems to carry the channel.

== International expansion ==
3D version of logo of Zoomer TV on a black background

In the spring of 2021, a similarly branded and programmed channel, Zoomer TV, launched in the United States on the online streaming service, Distro TV. The channel broadcasts programming aimed at the 45 and over demographic.

== Programming ==
Previous VisionTV logo (2001–2010)

VisionTV's programming consists of two programming streams: Mosaic and Cornerstone.

=== Mosaic ===
Its Mosaic block consists of faith related programming representing 75 faith groups within various religious denominations, including Catholics, Protestants, Muslims, Sikhs and Hindus. While the station sells time to several television evangelists, most of its Christian programming tends to originate from more mainstream denominations such as the United Church of Canada and the Catholic Church - although United Church of Canada stopped producing its weekly program in 2008 due to a poor time slot, high costs of airtime and lack of viewership.

=== Cornerstone ===
VisionTV's Cornerstone programs include music, feature films, dramas, comedies, documentaries and programming on social issues that explore spirituality, morality, and cultural diversity as well as other general entertainment programming.

The network also sponsors an annual Canadian drama competition, which solicits television series proposals revolving around faith and cultural diversity and then funds a pilot episode for the winning proposal. Two noted Canadian series, Lord Have Mercy! and Da Kink in My Hair, have been developed from pilots commissioned by VisionTV. VisionTV also commissioned and aired 2010 comedy series She's the Mayor.

== VisionTV HD ==
On March 23, 2017, ZoomerMedia launched VisionTV HD, a 1080i high definition simulcast of the standard definition feed. The HD feed is currently available on Bell Satellite TV, Bell Fibe TV, Bell Aliant Fibe TV, Rogers Cable, Optik TV, and Shaw Direct.
