= CIIT-DT =

Television station in Winnipeg

- Winnipeg, Manitoba; Canada
- Channels: Digital: 35 (UHF); Virtual: 35
- Branding: FaithTV

Programming
- Affiliations: Religious independent

Ownership
- Owner: ZoomerMedia; (Christian Channel Inc.)

History
- First air date: February 6, 2006
- Former call signs: CIIT-TV (2006–2011)
- Former channel numbers: Analogue: 35 (UHF, 2006–2011)
- Former affiliations: Omni Television (2006–2008); Independent (July–September 2008); Joytv (September 2008–September 2013)
- Call sign meaning: Channel II (11) Trinity (original licensee)

Technical information
- Licensing authority: CRTC
- ERP: 6 kW
- HAAT: 240.0 m (787 ft)
- Transmitter coordinates: 49°45′19″N 97°7′52″W

Links
- Website: FaithTV

CIIT-DT (channel 35) is a religious independent television station in Winnipeg, Manitoba, Canada, owned by ZoomerMedia. The station's studios are located on Osborne Street and Wardlaw Avenue in Winnipeg, and its transmitter is located near Courchaine Road (near Manitoba Provincial Road 200) in southern Winnipeg.

== History ==
=== Early life ===
In February 2002, Trinity Television Inc. was granted a licence for a religious television station in Winnipeg. The station was set to be launched in September 2004 as "NowTV", to be the second station using that brand, previously used on Trinity's Vancouver station, CHNU-TV. However, the station did not launch on that date.

Logo used while as Omni 11, used from 2006–2008.

In 2004, before that station's launch, Rogers Communications bought Trinity Television and took control of CIIT's licence. Under Rogers control, the station was set to be launched again on November 14, 2005, as the fourth Omni Television station, it was later set back again and launched on February 6, 2006, as "Omni 11". The use of channel 35 marks CIIT as Winnipeg's first ever UHF station.

On September 28, 2007, Rogers' CRTC application to acquire the Citytv stations, including CHMI in Winnipeg, was approved. As a condition of this approval, Rogers had to sell CIIT and CHNU in Vancouver, in order to comply with CRTC restrictions on owning multiple stations in the same language in the same market. Rogers had a one-year grace period to find new owners for both stations.

Logo used while as CIIT 11, used from July–August 2008.

On November 6, 2007, Rogers Communications announced the sale of CIIT and CHNU to S-VOX. The deal was approved by the CRTC on March 31, 2008. The sale was finalized on April 30, 2008, and S-VOX assumed control of the station on June 30 of that year. Shortly after S-VOX took control of the station, In July 2008, CIIT disaffiliated from the Omni television system and was subsequently rebranded as "CIIT11". S-VOX soon announced that both CIIT and CHNU would rebrand under a newly created television brand, Joytv. CIIT was rebranded again on September 1, 2008, using the on-air brand "Joytv 11".

Logo used while as Joytv 11, used until August 2013.

In June 2009, S-VOX announced it would sell its broadcasting assets to ZoomerMedia, a company controlled by Moses Znaimer. The sale was approved by the CRTC on March 30, 2010. ZoomerMedia assumed control of S-VOX's broadcasting assets on June 30, 2010.

=== As Hope TV/FaithTV ===
In late-August 2013, CIIT re-launched as "Hope TV", dropping the Joytv format and all secular programs in favour of a traditional religious format. Total weekly viewing hours dropped from 84,000 in Fall 2012 to just 28,000 hours in Fall 2013, recovering slightly to 42,000 hours in Fall 2014—but still equivalent to just one percent of the total viewing hours earned by the Winnipeg CTV station, and two percent of the hours earned by both the CBC and Global stations.

HopeTV logo

In 2017, CIIT was reprimanded by the Canadian Broadcast Standards Council for having aired an episode of the time-buy program Truth of God, wherein a pastor referred to U.S. lawmakers as "pedophiles" and with homophobic slurs when discussing his objection to bathroom bills.

In September 2018, CIIT was rebranded FaithTV.

== Programming ==
As part of Omni Television and Joytv, CIIT aired a lineup primarily consisting of faith-based programming (primarily televangelists and religion-oriented talk shows), syndicated sitcoms and dramas, and leftover U.S. prime time programs not picked up by other Canadian networks. Upon its re-launch as Hope TV, all general entertainment programming was dropped in favor of a lineup consisting only of religious programs.

== Technical information ==
=== Subchannel ===
Subchannels of CIIT-DT
| Channel | Res. | Short name | Programming |
|---|---|---|---|
| 35.1 | 1080i | CIIT-DT | FaithTV |

=== Analogue-to-digital conversion ===
On August 31, 2011, when Canadian television stations in CRTC-designated mandatory markets transitioned from analogue to digital broadcasts, CIIT-TV flash cut its digital signal into operation on UHF channel 35.

== Channel placement ==
On Shaw and MTS TV, CIIT airs on channel 11, displacing the longtime previous occupant community access channel Shaw TV (the channel first used channel 11 in 1986 after a previous move from channel 13; the station was formerly called VPW 11, later Videon Cable 11 on Videon before being taken over by Shaw, and GWC-TV (Greater Winnipeg Cablevision) before its Shaw takeover). Shaw has moved their service to channel 9. CIIT is also available on Rogers digital cable for viewers in Ontario.

== See also ==
- 2007 Canada broadcast TV realignment
