= CJNT-DT =

Television station in Montreal

- Montreal, Quebec; Canada
- Channels: Digital: 17 (UHF); Virtual: 62
- Branding: Citytv Montreal (general); CityNews Montreal (newscasts)

Programming
- Affiliations: Citytv

Ownership
- Owner: Rogers Sports & Media; (Rogers Media Inc.)
- Sister stations: Sportsnet East

History
- First air date: September 8, 1997
- Former call signs: CJNT-TV (1997–2011)
- Former channel numbers: Analogue: 62 (UHF, 1997–2011); Digital: 49 (UHF, 2011-2020)
- Former affiliations: Independent (1997–2001, 2009–2012); CH / E! (2001–2009); Omni Television (multicultural programming, interim, 2012–2013)

Technical information
- Licensing authority: CRTC
- ERP: 2.07 kW
- HAAT: 213.9 m (702 ft)
- Transmitter coordinates: 45°30′19.4″N 73°35′29.3″W

Links
- Website: www.citytv.com/montreal

CJNT-DT (channel 62) is a television station in Montreal, Quebec, Canada, owned and operated by the Citytv network, a division of Rogers Sports & Media. The station maintains studios inside the Rogers Building at the corner of McGill College Avenue and Cathcart Street near the Place Ville Marie complex in downtown Montreal, and its transmitter is located at Mount Royal Park, near downtown Montreal.

== History ==
Logo as TEQ, 1980s to 1997

The station signed on the air on September 8, 1997, but had its roots in the 1980s as La Télévision Ethnique du Québec (TEQ), a public access ethnic cable channel. It had plans on moving over-the-air as early as the early 1990s, but was dogged by financial problems. Even after it signed on, its finances were in such a state that it never signed on earlier than noon. Part of the problem was that its effective radiated power was only 11 kilowatts, easily the weakest full-power station in Montreal and one of the weakest in North America—roughly on the same level as low-power UHF stations in the United States. This effectively limited its over-the-air footprint to the Island of Montreal, Jésus Island and a few areas on the mainland; even in those areas, its signal was marginal at best. Most viewers could only get a clear picture on cable.

Many shows that had aired on TEQ for many years did not make the cut for CJNT because they did not meet the standards for commercial broadcasting. However, many of the shows that did make it were of somewhat marginal quality. Its commitment to ethnic groups was questioned, especially late at night when it would frequently show English-language infomercials for a psychic hotline.

The logo used when CJNT first went on the air in 1997. It was used until 2001 when Canwest bought and unified all of their secondary non-CBC stations under the CH brand. For the logos used as CH, see the CH article.

=== WIC and Canwest ===
Western International Communications bought CJNT in 1999. WIC owned Montreal's CTV affiliate, CFCF-TV (channel 12), but was facing serious competition from Global, which had expanded into Quebec the same year CJNT signed on. WIC figured CJNT would give it much-needed leverage in Montreal. It planned to relaunch CJNT on the model of Canada's first multicultural station, CFMT-TV in Toronto, with 60% ethnic content and 40% American content. However, WIC was only able to buy the shares of CJNT held by Marie Griffiths, as ownership of the rest of the shares was being contested in court. It was not allowed to make changes to CJNT's license without majority ownership, and its plans became moot when Canwest bought WIC's television assets in 2000. Canwest already held controlling interest in Global station CKMI-TV, which was licensed in Quebec City but had activated a rebroadcaster in Montreal and moved the bulk of its operations there. The CRTC forced Canwest to put CFCF up for sale. Well aware that Canwest had bought CKMI to get its programming into Montreal, the CRTC ruled that Montreal's anglophone population was too small to permit a twinstick between CFCF and CKMI (CFCF was eventually sold to CTV). However, Canwest was allowed to keep WIC's interest in CJNT, and bought the remaining shares.

CJNT Montreal logo and its horizontal version, used from 2007 to 2011. From 2007 to 2009, it was used for local and ethnic programming only. It then became the station's only branding from 2009 until 2011.

Canwest had CJNT file for bankruptcy, and changed its conditions of licence to reduce the ethnic content to 60%. On September 8, 2001, Global relaunched the station with a mixture of ethnic, English and French language programming. The bulk of the English-language shows came from Canwest's secondary television system, CH. For all intents and purposes, CJNT thus became the third CH station, and the only one actually licensed to a major Canadian city. Since there was no "H" in "CJNT" (unlike CHCH-TV and CHEK-TV), the CH in Montreal stood for "Canal Horizon" ("Channel Horizon" in English), although it changed its on-air brand name to just "CH" in 2002. The station remained a CH branded station until September 7, 2007, when Canwest decided to brand the station as "CJNT Montreal", while CH programming rebranded as "E! Montreal".

As a CH and later E! station, CJNT had many English-language American imports due to E!'s emphasis on American shows that could not fit onto Global's schedule. To partially comply with its ethnic programming remit, the station also carried airings of some of E!'s original programming dubbed in other languages.

=== Channel Zero ===
On February 5, 2009, Canwest announced it would explore "strategic options", including possible sale or closure, for CJNT and its other stations in the E! system, saying "a second conventional TV network is no longer key to the long-term success" of the company. While Rogers Communications, owners of Canada's other over-the-air multicultural television stations through the Omni Television system, seemed to be a logical buyer for CJNT, that company reportedly had no interest in expanding its conventional television holdings at the time.

On June 30, 2009, it was announced that Channel Zero Inc. would purchase CJNT and CHCH in Hamilton, Ontario from Canwest in exchange for $12 in cash and the assumption of various station liabilities. The Canadian Radio-television and Telecommunications Commission (CRTC) approved the sale on August 28 of that year.

Channel Zero took control of the station's programming at midnight ET on the morning of August 31. On that date, CJNT disaffiliated from E! (which would shut down later that day) and adopted a new schedule featuring a mix of music videos and already existing local ethnic programming during the day, and foreign movies at night, and reverted to branding itself as simply "CJNT". There was no American simsub programming for the first year. Despite initial plans calling for a majority of the music videos to be foreign, most would end up being English-language videos with a moderate amount of French and foreign language videos included. In addition, CJNT would add, in sparse amounts, additional programming during the 2009–2010 season, including Let's Get It On, a mixed martial arts program; Ed the Sock's This Movie Sucks!, a movie show featuring the former MuchMusic character alongside co-host Liana Kerzner and comedian Ron Sparks; and infomercials.

CJNT as Metro 14, from 2011 to 2013

On June 14, 2010, Channel Zero announced it would be rebranding CJNT as "Metro 14" in the fall, to appeal to a wider urban audience; the "14" represents its cable slot on Vidéotron in the Greater Montreal area. In September 2010, CJNT began airing American network television series for the first time since Channel Zero took ownership, including Everybody Hates Chris, Jimmy Kimmel Live!, and Nightline. In addition to the American network series, CJNT began airing the CHCH produced talk show, Sportsline with Mark Hebscher. On February 2, 2011, at 6 a.m. ET, the station officially rebranded as "Metro 14", months behind the original announced date of fall 2010.

=== Citytv Montreal ===
Seeking to expand its television holdings, Rogers Media announced on May 3, 2012, its intent to acquire CJNT from Channel Zero, with plans to convert the station into an owned-and-operated station of its Citytv television system (was known simply as City from December 2012 to September 2018). Simultaneously with the announcement of its pending purchase of the station, Rogers also announced it had signed an affiliation agreement with CJNT, allowing it to begin carrying Citytv programming on June 4, 2012, while the sale still awaited approval. The deal gave Citytv stations in all provinces west of Atlantic Canada as well as the system's first television station located east of the Greater Toronto Area; Citytv programming had already been available in Quebec via cable and satellite through distribution of the system's owned-and-operated broadcast stations out of Toronto, Edmonton, Calgary, Winnipeg and Vancouver. The deal was announced at the same time Rogers Media was awaiting CRTC approval of its purchase of cable-only educational service Saskatchewan Communications Network (which had carried Citytv programming from 3 p.m. to 6 a.m. daily since January 2, 2012) from Bluepoint Investment Corporation, which effectively made CJNT Citytv's seventh owned-and-operated station. Starting in the fall of 2012, the station began using the brand "Citytv on Metro 14" (later "City on Metro 14") during Citytv programming.

Most Channel Zero-owned and -acquired programming was dropped at this time, aside from the weekday morning show Metro Debut (a Toronto-based program that primarily consisted of music videos interspersed with news, weather, and traffic updates), which itself was expanded to three hours. To comply with CJNT's obligations to carry multicultural programming, the station also aired programming from Rogers' Omni Television system (particularly Omni News). Initially, the station did not carry Citytv prime time programming, with non-ethnic programming confined primarily to CityLine, and syndicated and Citytv original programming during the late afternoon, early evening, and overnight hours. Selected U.S. and Citytv original programming was added in prime time upon the start of the 2012–13 season, but continued to be accompanied by Omni programming.

In its purchase application to the CRTC, heard at a public hearing on November 7, 2012, Rogers requested to convert CJNT to a full English-language commercial licence with programming and conditions of licence similar to the company's other Citytv stations. Alternatively, if the conversion were not to be approved, Rogers requested that certain of the station's current conditions of licence regarding ethnic programming be relaxed. A separate application was heard as part of the same public hearing for a new Montreal multicultural station, CFHD-DT, filed by a group led by Montreal's Nowrouzzahrai family; Rogers indicated that if CJNT's sale/conversion and the CFHD licence were both approved, it would provide funding for, and make Omni programming available to, the new station. The CRTC approved both the sale and conversion of CJNT and the application for CFHD on December 20, 2012. With the conversion, CJNT is the first over-the-air station in Canadian television history to have its licensed format changed.

Rogers announced it would officially rebrand the station as "City Montreal" on February 4, 2013. It assumed the full City schedule on this date, and finally abandoned the "Metro 14" brand several weeks later. The station continued to air an hour of Omni programming mornings at 7 a.m. and at several other times on weekends until the fall of 2013, as CFHD had not yet launched. The station began introducing a new slate of local programming, including the three-hour morning show Breakfast Television on weekdays (which premiered August 26, 2013), and a weekly half-hour local sports show, Montreal Connected (later Sportsnet Central Montreal, which premiered May 30, 2013), which Rogers promised to the CRTC in its application to buy CJNT. In addition, an independently produced weekly series, Only In Montreal, began airing in July 2013.

On September 2, 2014, Rogers and Sportsnet announced that it had acquired English-language regional television rights to the Montreal Canadiens under a three-year deal. In addition to games that may be carried by City as part of Hockey Night in Canada, CJNT served as an overflow channel for games not carried by the Sportsnet networks.

Sportsnet Central Montreal was cancelled in September 2017. A largely-identical program with the same panelists known as Montreal Sports Weekly premiered on CFHD shortly afterward.

== News operation ==
Since its inception, under Canwest ownership, CJNT was the only station in the CH/E! system not to air any newscasts under the CH News brand.

Local evening and late-night newscasts under the branding CityNews Montreal launched on September 3, 2018, as part of an expansion of local news programming by Citytv's owned-and-operated broadcast stations. Both newscasts air for an hour each. Similarly to the format of its sister station in Toronto, CJNT's newscasts use an "anchorless" format, where all stories are presented by videojournalists on the field, eschewing in-studio anchors.

From August 23, 2013, to September 5, 2019, CJNT produced a local version of Citytv's morning show Breakfast Television, which ran for three hours on weekdays. On September 5, 2019, Rogers announced that the show had been cancelled effective immediately after just over six years on-air. A company executive stated that the program was "not sustainable". As of its most-recent license renewal, the station was no longer explicitly required to produce a morning newscast, with its commitments to local news programming now being fulfilled by the two nightly newscasts.

=== Notable on-air staff ===
- Chantal Desjardins – Sportsnet Montreal correspondent
- Alexandre Despatie – co-host
- Wilder Weir – Live Eye and Sportsnet Central host

== Technical information ==
=== Subchannel ===
Subchannel of CJNT-DT
Channel	Res.	Short name	Programming
62.1	1080i	CJNT-DT	Citytv

=== Analogue-to-digital conversion ===
On August 27, 2011, four days before Canadian television stations in CRTC-designated mandatory markets were to transition from analogue to digital broadcasts under federal mandate, the station shut down its analog transmitter and flash cut its digital signal into operation on UHF channel 49, using virtual channel as 62. However, its digital signal operates at only 4 kilowatts – roughly equivalent to 20 kilowatts for an analogue signal. As a result, the station's coverage area is not much larger than it was in analogue.
