= CFHD-DT =

Television station in Montreal

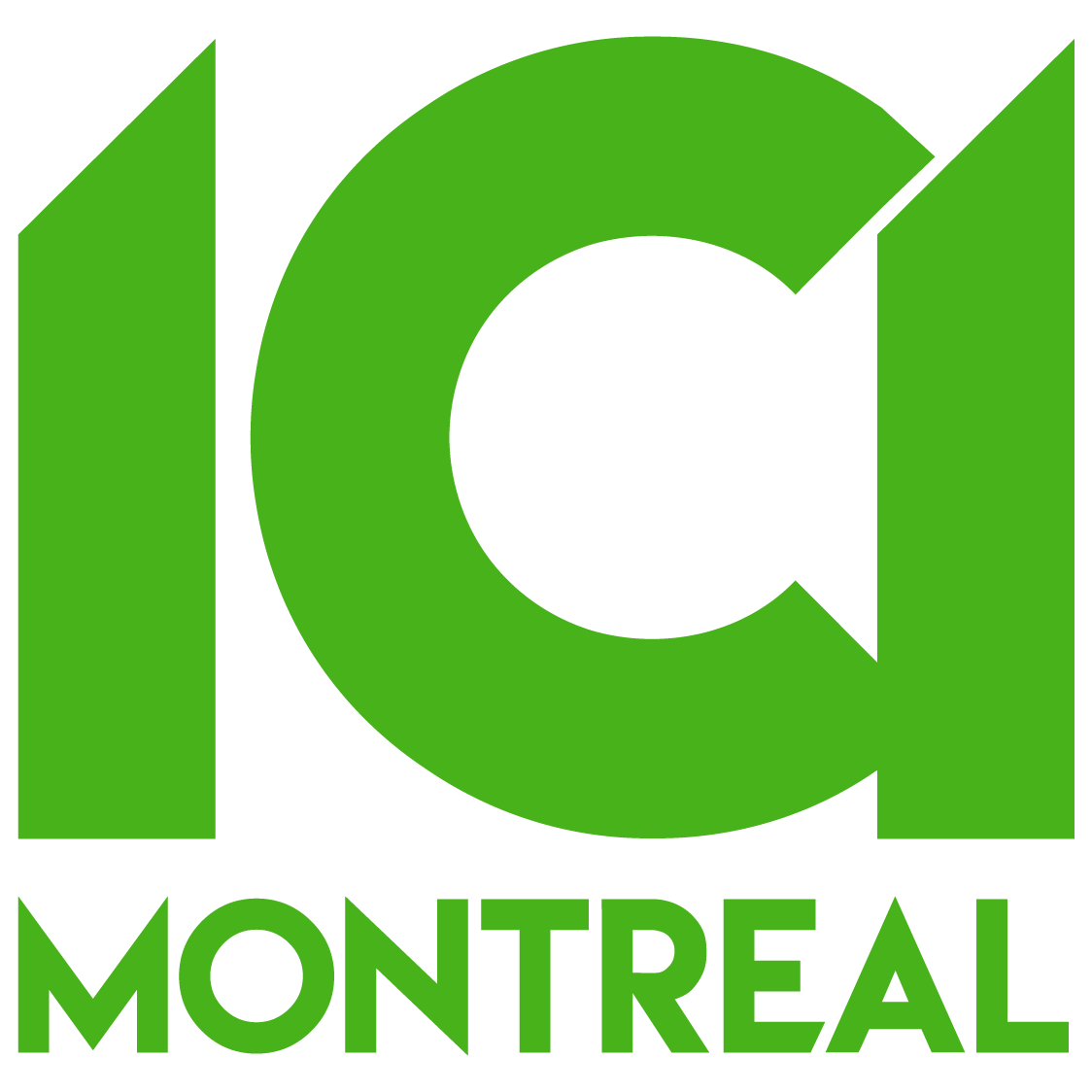
- Montreal, Quebec; Canada
- Channels: Digital: 31 (UHF); Virtual: 47
- Branding: ICI Télévision

Programming
- Affiliations: Independent; Omni Television (secondary)

Ownership
- Owner: Norouzi family; (4517466 Canada Inc.)

History
- First air date: December 11, 2013
- Former call signs: CFHG-DT (2013, pre-launch)
- Former channel numbers: Digital: 47 (UHF, 2013–2020)

Technical information
- Licensing authority: CRTC
- ERP: 4.03 kW
- HAAT: 192.5 m (632 ft)
- Transmitter coordinates: 45°30′10.7″N 73°35′48.1″W

Links
- Website: ICI Montreal

CFHD-DT (channel 47) is an independent multicultural television station in Montreal, Quebec, Canada, owned by Sam Norouzi and his family. The station's studios are located on Christophe Colomb Avenue in Montreal's Ahuntsic district, at the home of the family's production company Mi-Cam Communications. Its transmitter is located at Mount Royal Park, near Downtown Montreal.

CFHD-DT, which operates under the branding ICI Télévision (a bilingual abbreviation of "International Channel/Canal International"), is a de facto successor to CJNT; the station had started as a multicultural station, but its ethnic output decreased significantly in favor of commercial, English-language programming after it was sold to Western International Communications (WIC), and in turn, Canwest and Channel Zero. ICI was announced in parallel with a proposal by Rogers Media to purchase CJNT (which had since affiliated with its Citytv network) and change its license to make it a conventional, English language station. Both Rogers and Channel Zero also planned to provide resources to the new channel. As part of Omni Regional—a distribution of Omni Television stations as a must-carry specialty channel, the network is fed province-wide as ICI Québec.

== History ==
Prior to the founding of ICI, Sam Norouzi's father produced a Persian program for Télévision Ethnique du Québec (TEQ), a cable access channel that was the precursor to CJNT, which went on the air in 1997. CJNT was sold to WIC in 1999, and became owned by Canwest as a CH/E! station when Canwest bought WIC in 2001. Canwest in turn sold the station to Channel Zero in 2009. Over the years, the station's commitment to producing local ethnic programming declined. When it was owned by Channel Zero, it did not produce any such programming at all.

On May 3, 2012, Rogers Media announced its intent to acquire CJNT, with plans to convert it into an owned-and-operated station of its Citytv network. In the purchase application published on September 5, 2012, Rogers asked the Canadian Radio-television and Telecommunications Commission (CRTC) for permission to convert CJNT from a multicultural to a full English-language station with programming and conditions of licence similar to the company's other Citytv stations. In exchange, Rogers proposed to support a new multicultural station, ICI (standing for International Channel/Canal International), whose application was made public for the first time on the same date. The CRTC heard both the application for the sale and conversion of CJNT and the application for ICI on November 7, 2012, and approved them on December 20, 2012. As promised, Rogers is supporting ICI with $1.07 million in funding as well as free access to 200 hours a year of programming from Rogers' ethnic Omni Television network. In addition, Channel Zero is offering the station a $1 million loan and free master control services for five years. The station turned on its transmitter for testing on August 21, 2013, and started programming on December 11, 2013, assuming CJNT's former role as Montreal's only multicultural station.

The station's call letters were to be CFHG-DT, but this was changed to CFHD-DT prior to launch.

Rogers reached an agreement to carry CFHD as part of Omni Regional, which distributes Omni programming as a must-carry specialty channel (with carriage revenue used to help provide additional funding to Omni). In August 2017, the CRTC relieved Vidéotron from carrying CFHD on its cable systems as a terrestrial channel, as it now carries the feed supplied by Rogers (marketed as "ICI Québec") as part of Omni Regional.

=== CBC lawsuit ===
On March 25, 2013, the CBC filed a lawsuit against Norouzi, requesting that the ICI trademark be expunged and the new station refrain from using ICI as its name. Its French arm, Radio-Canada, had registered a series of 31 trademarks surrounding the word "Ici", and announced in June 2013 that it would re-brand all of its media outlets under brands prefixed with Ici (such as "Ici Télé" for Télévision de Radio-Canada, but revised to "Ici Radio-Canada Télé" after criticism over the proposed removal of the long-standing "Radio-Canada" brand). Norouzi's trademark application for "ICI" was submitted in August 2012 and registered in September 2012, prior to the submission of the station's license application with the CRTC, while Radio-Canada's "Ici"-related trademarks were registered the following month. However, the CBC argued that his trademark was invalid because the division had used the phrase "Ici Radio-Canada" as part of its imaging since the 1930s, and that Norouzi's trademark application improperly declared that he had begun using the name in commerce, even before the station was officially unveiled or licensed.

In response, Norouzi considered the lawsuit and the CBC's ability to assert a trademark over an adverb to be "ridiculous", and stated that he intends to retain the ICI name and fight the corporation in court.

== Programming ==
The station is structured as a producers' co-operative, where producers of local ethnic shows buy airtime on the station and sell their own advertising. TEQ was operated in a similar way. The Norouzis believed this was preferable to the commercial model employed at other ethnic stations in Canada, as the producers are closer to their communities and therefore best positioned to find advertisers. While the station's licence allows for it to air some non-ethnic programming, it airs an entirely ethnic lineup with most of it being locally produced. CFHD-DT airs programming in Italian, Greek, Arabic, Portuguese, Persian, Romanian, Mandarin, Cantonese, Russian, Hindi, Urdu, Spanish, French, English, Armenian, Polish and Creole. Programming is directed at the Armenian, Italian, Latin-American, Lebanese, Egyptian, Maghrebian, Greek, Portuguese, Chinese, Russian, Romanian, Iranian, Haitian, Jewish, German, Ukrainian, Polish, and Filipino ethnic communities in Quebec.

As of May 2014, the only programs broadcast on CFHD-DT not produced by the station or produced locally by other producers are a Portuguese soap opera, Bem-Vindos a Beirais; South Asian Veggie Table, the only OMNI program on CFHD's schedule; and Il est écrit, the French-dubbed version of the Seventh-day Adventist Church's weekly It Is Written program. Much of CFHD's programming is also available on YouTube.

In 2017, the channel briefly aired an English-language sports program, Montreal Sports Weekly, which was a continuation of CJNT's cancelled sports panel discussion program Sportsnet Central Montreal.

== See also ==
- CJNT-DT
