= CHNU-DT =

Television station in Fraser Valley, British Columbia

- Fraser Valley–Vancouver, British Columbia; Canada
- City: Fraser Valley, British Columbia
- Channels: Digital: 24 (UHF); Virtual: 66
- Branding: Joytv

Programming
- Affiliations: 66.1: Religious independent; Yes TV (secondary)

Ownership
- Owner: ZoomerMedia; (Christian Channel Inc.)

History
- First air date: September 15, 2001
- Former call signs: CHNU-TV (2001–2011)
- Former channel numbers: Analog: 66 (UHF, 2001–2011); Digital: 47 (UHF, until 2021)
- Former affiliations: Independent (2001–2005 and 2007–2008); Omni Television (2005–2007)
- Call sign meaning: NOWTV UHF (former branding)

Technical information
- Licensing authority: CRTC
- ERP: CHNU-DT: 35 kW; CHNU-DT-1: 3.5 kW
- HAAT: CHNU-DT: 643 m (2,110 ft); CHNU-DT-1: 99.6 m (327 ft)
- Transmitter coordinates: CHNU-DT: 49°21′16″N 122°57′30″W; CHNU-DT-1: 48°25′30″N 123°20′13″W
- Translator(s): CHNU-DT-1 21 (UHF) Victoria

Links
- Website: www.joytv.ca

CHNU-DT (channel 66) is a religious independent television station serving southwestern British Columbia, Canada, including Greater Vancouver, Victoria, the Fraser Valley and surrounding areas. Licensed to the Fraser Valley Regional District, the station is owned by ZoomerMedia and is branded on air as Joytv. CHNU-DT's studios are located on 192 Street/Highway 10 in Surrey, and its transmitter is located on Mount Seymour.

== History ==
CHNU-TV was licensed in July 2000 by the Canadian Radio-television and Telecommunications Commission (CRTC) to Trinity Television Inc. Trinity Television initially requested to assign CFVT as the station's call letters (standing for "Fraser Valley Television"); however, this was denied by Industry Canada. The station first signed on the air on September 15, 2001, under the CHNU callsign. In any case, the call letters had not featured prominently in the station's on-air branding, as the station opted to use the on-air brand "NOWTV". CHNU relied on television advertisements and donations from viewers for financial support.

On November 1, 2004, Trinity Television announced that it was selling CHNU and the licence for a yet-to-be-launched and similarly formatted television station in Winnipeg, CIIT-TV, to Rogers Communications, subject to CRTC approval. The financial difficulties Trinity experienced with operating CHNU and getting CIIT on the air, combined with the fact that it could not raise capital from outside investors because of its status as a charitable organization, were the main reasons given for the sale. The deal was approved several months later, finally giving Rogers a broadcast television station in the Vancouver market, where it had lost bids to launch one in the past. At the same time, Rogers received approval to operate a rebroadcast transmitter in Victoria on UHF channel 21, broadcasting at an effective radiated power of 720 watts. In 2006, the transmitter's power was increased to 17.2 kilowatts, with the tower height being decreased to compensate.

After CHNU was bought by Rogers, the NOWTV branding was dropped in favour of Rogers Omni Television brand. This logo was used from 2005 to 2007.

After acquiring the station from Trinity Television, Rogers announced in late June 2005 that the station would join the Rogers-owned Omni Television system. The Omni brand had previously been associated only with multicultural stations. The rebranding occurred in September of that year, making CHNU the third station in the Omni television system.

CHNU's third logo, used from 2007–2008.

On September 28, 2007, Rogers' purchase of the Citytv stations formerly owned by CHUM Limited was approved (although CTVglobemedia sold off the stations the previous year). As a condition of approval, Rogers had to sell CHNU and CIIT in Winnipeg due to the CRTC's restrictions on owning multiple television stations broadcasting in the same language in a single market. Rogers had a one-year grace period to find a buyer. Rogers subsequently announced plans to purchase Vancouver multilingual station CHNM-DT (channel 42), which the company argued would not violate any ownership restrictions under the CRTC's exemptions for stations broadcasting in different languages. On October 31, 2007, CHNU was rebranded "CHNU 10" in order to limit viewer confusion because Rogers' contemporaneous acquisition of CHNM-TV meant that the Omni Television brand would be transferred to that station in 2008.

On November 6, 2007, Rogers announced that CHNU and CIIT would be sold to S-VOX, owner of VisionTV, with no financial deals being released. The deal was approved by the CRTC on March 31, 2008. The sale was finalized on April 30, 2008, and S-VOX assumed control of the station on May 26 of that year. S-VOX soon announced that both CHNU and CIIT would rebrand as "Joytv". CHNU rebranded on September 1, 2008, using the on-air brand "Joytv 10".

CHNU's fourth logo, used from 2008 to 2013.

In June 2009, S-VOX announced it would sell its broadcasting assets, including CHNU, to ZoomerMedia, a company controlled by Moses Znaimer. The sale was approved by the CRTC on March 30, 2010. ZoomerMedia assumed control of S-VOX's broadcasting assets on June 30, 2010. ZoomerMedia closed the Joytv system in 2011. The Joytv brand was retained for CHNU, while CIIT was converted into a religious station under the moniker "HopeTV" now currently known as "FaithTV".

== Programming ==
CHNU features a variety of multi-faith programming. The station also formerly aired a very diverse selection of general entertainment syndicated programming, ranging from sitcoms (such as Reba and My Name Is Earl), dramas (such as Stargate SG-1 and Supernatural) to classic programs (such as Matlock and Ironside), which was dropped in the fall of 2017 in favour of a traditional religious format similar to Winnipeg sister station CIIT. The station also airs a sizeable amount of multicultural religious programming as well, particularly centering on the Christian, Islam, Hindu and Sikh faiths.

=== Local productions ===
==== The Standard ====
The Standard was a news and current affairs program that debuted on CHNU in September 2005. The locally produced program focused on national and international issues, but from a religious and spiritual standpoint. Cancelled for the final time in August 2010, reruns of The Standard continue to be seen on CHNU, CIIT and Vision TV; it also formerly aired weekly on CFMT in Toronto and Viceland Canada. The final host of the series was Peter Klein, former producer of the CBS newsmagazine 60 Minutes; previous hosts included Randall Mark, Andrew Dawson, Rafe Mair, Mark Schneider, Russ Froese and Salimah Ebrahim. The field interviewer position was held by Shannon Nelson, and previously Laura-Lynn Tyler.

Following an initial three-year run that included feature interviews with the likes of Zimbabwe President Robert Mugabe; Prime Minister of Canada Stephen Harper; author Salman Rushdie; Nobel Peace Prize winner Dr. Shirin Ebadi; and HRH Prince Edward, the program was cancelled and ended after the June 6, 2008, broadcast; it was subsequently replaced by The Daily when S-VOX took over ownership of the station. It was relaunched in September 2009 as a weekly program hosted by Klein. The program was co-created in 2005 by producer Jonathan Roth (who remained as senior producer throughout the program's run) and station general manager Terry Mahoney.

==== The Daily ====
The Daily was a talk show that debuted on June 9, 2008, hosted by Mark Washington and Laura-Lynn Thompson. The Daily was also broadcast nationally on VisionTV. The program was broadcast from facilities at the Shaw Tower in Downtown Vancouver. The program was cancelled on April 15, 2009.

== Technical information ==
=== Subchannel ===
Subchannel of CHNU-DT
Subchannel	Res.	Short name	Programming
66.1	1080i	Joytv	Joytv

=== Spectrum repacking ===
In April 2017, Industry Canada posted new channel assignments for stations as a result of spectrum repacking due to the U.S. 600 MHz spectrum auction. In 2021, CHNU-DT moved to channel 24, which was formerly occupied by K24IC-D, a translator of KBTC-TV in Bellingham, Washington.

=== Analog-to-digital conversion ===
The CRTC granted approval for CHNU to broadcast a digital signal on UHF channel 47 with a stronger transmitter from Abbotsford that would cover most of the Lower Mainland, doubling its coverage area in comparison to that of its analog transmitter. CHNU flash cut its digital signal into operation on UHF channel 47, on August 31, 2011, the official date on which Canadian television stations in CRTC-designated mandatory markets transitioned from analog to digital broadcasts (the allocation was previously occupied by the pre-transition digital signal of Citytv O&O sister CKVU (channel 10)). Digital television receivers display CHNU-DT's virtual channel as its analog-era UHF channel 66, which was among the high band UHF channels (52–69) that were removed from broadcasting use as a result of the transition.

The CRTC also approved a digital transmitter to serve as a rebroadcaster for CHNU on UHF channel 21 in Victoria, also with a greater coverage area. Although the station is based out of Surrey, British Columbia, the transmitter tower was located in Abbotsford and analog broadcasts were at an insufficient power level to be viewed in many Greater Vancouver municipalities, including the city of Vancouver proper. According to the station's website, CHNU primarily targets viewers in the Fraser Valley, Vancouver and Victoria.

== See also ==
- 2007 Canada broadcast TV realignment
