= Omni Television =

Canadian television system and specialty channel

- Type: Broadcast television system
- Country: Canada
- Broadcast area: Canada
- Headquarters: Rogers Building, Toronto, Ontario, Canada

Ownership
- Owner: Rogers Communications
- Parent: Rogers Sports & Media

History
- Launched: September 3, 1979; 47 years ago (independent television network); September 16, 2002; 24 years ago (launch of the Omni system)
- Founder: Dan Iannuzzi; Jerry Grafstein; Raymond Moriyama; Steve Stavro; Garth Drabinsky; Nat Taylor
- Replaced: Shaw Multicultural Channel
- Former names: MTV (1979-1983); CFMT Television (1983-2002); Channel M (current Vancouver station only; 2003-2008)

Links
- Website: www.omnitv.ca

Omni Television (stylized as OMNI Television) is a Canadian television system and group of specialty channels owned by Rogers Sports & Media, a subsidiary of Rogers Communications. It currently consists of all six of Canada's conventional multicultural television stations, which are located in Ontario (two stations), British Columbia, Alberta (two stations), and an affiliate in Quebec. The system's flagship station is CFMT in Toronto, which was the first independent multicultural television station in Canada.

The Omni brand was first introduced in 2002 after Rogers launched a second station in Toronto, CJMT; the two stations were collectively branded as Omni Television, with CJMT branding as "Omni.2" and focusing on programs targeting Asian and African communities, and CFMT "Omni.1" focusing on targeting the European and Caribbean communities. The Omni brand expanded outside of Toronto for the first time in 2005, with Rogers' acquisition of religious independent stations in Vancouver and Winnipeg.

In 2007, Rogers secured new multicultural licenses in Calgary and Edmonton, announced its sale of the Vancouver and Winnipeg stations to S-VOX, and then acquired Vancouver's existing multicultural station CHNM. In 2012, Omni added an affiliate in Montreal via the new multicultural station CFHD-DT, with Rogers agreeing to help support the station in exchange for relieving CJNT of its own multicultural remit.

Since September 2017, Omni began to be distributed throughout the remainder of the country, as a group of specialty channels with mandatory carriage. This group is licensed under the blanket name Omni Regional; Rogers argued that revenue from mandatory carriage was necessary to restore and sustain the stations' local programming. Originally licensed by the CRTC on a three-year interim basis while the commission considered alternative proposals for a national multicultural channel, the Commission ultimately chose to re-licence Omni Regional until at least 2023, on the basis of commitments to expanded Canadian programming production.

== Etymology ==
Derived from the Latin word "omnis" meaning "all", "Omni" is not an acronym, although the name is written all in capital letters.

== History ==
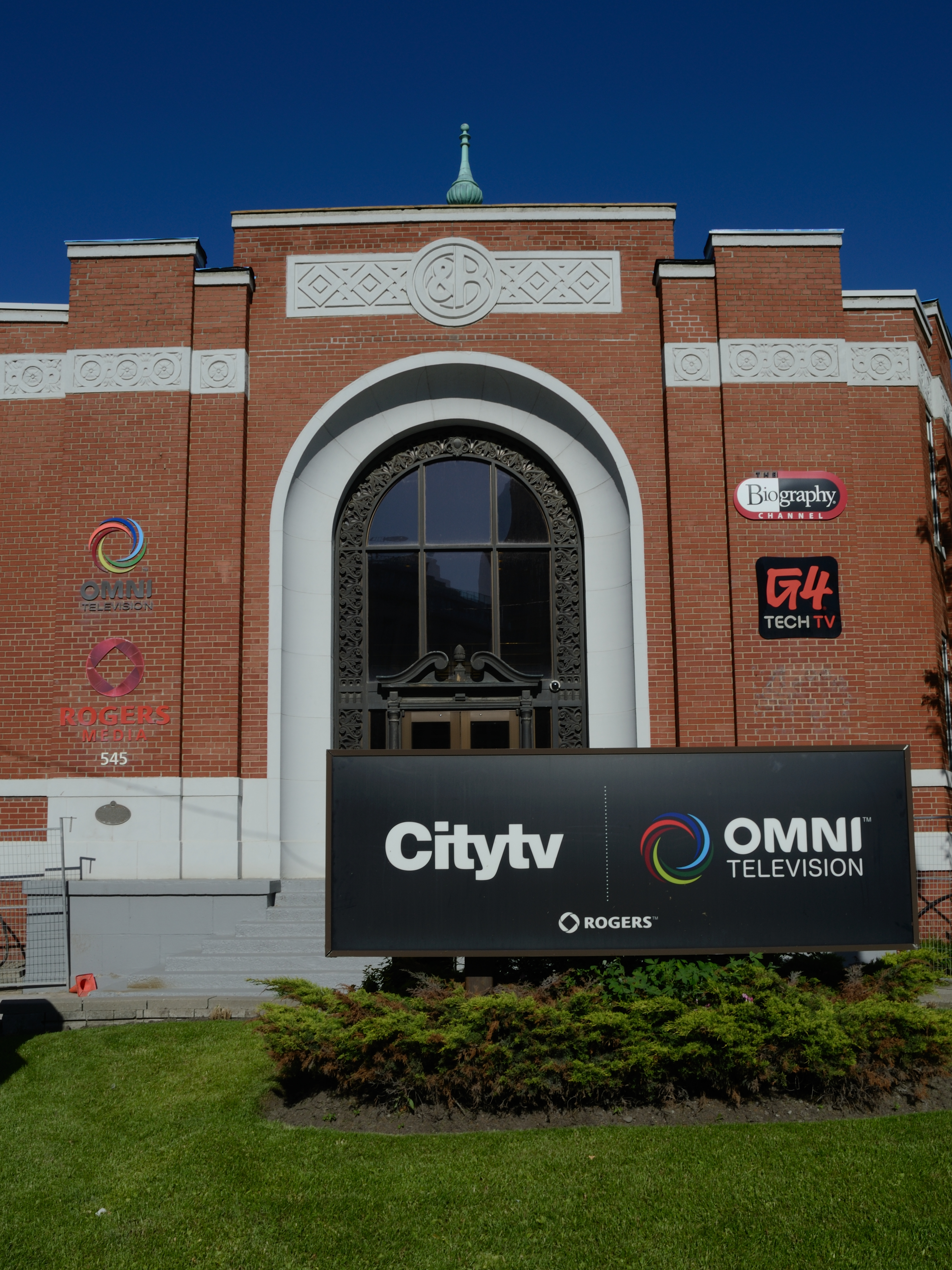
Former studios of Omni Television, from its 1979 launch to 2007.

Toronto's CFMT-TV launched in 1979 as Canada's first multilingual/multicultural television station, owned by Multilingual Television (Toronto) Ltd. The station was originally referred to as "MTV" before using its call letters to identify on-air in 1983 due to confusion with the American music video channel. As its initial format was 100% ethnic, the station experienced financial difficulties, and was on the verge of bankruptcy when Rogers stepped in and purchased it in 1986. Rogers then attempted to launch a similar multicultural station in Vancouver in 1996, 1999 and 2002, but all three attempts were rejected by the Canadian Radio-television and Telecommunications Commission (CRTC). It was, however, given a second multicultural licence in Toronto to provide room for additional multicultural programing, and launched CJMT-TV as a sister station to CFMT in fall 2002. It was at this point that the "OMNI Television" brand was introduced, with CFMT and CJMT branded as "OMNI.1" and "OMNI.2" respectively.

The Omni brand was expanded in 2005, when Rogers acquired two religious TV stations, CHNU-TV in the Vancouver market and CIIT-TV in Winnipeg, from Trinity Television. CHNU was rebranded from "NOWTV" to "OMNI.10" in September 2005, while CIIT went on air as "OMNI.11" on February 6, 2006.

Omni Television logo used until late 2018

=== 2007 realignment ===
Several proposed changes to the Omni system were announced, either by Rogers or by the CRTC, during a one-month span from June to July 2007. First, on June 8, the CRTC granted Rogers licences to operate new multicultural stations in Calgary and Edmonton, beating out a competing proposal from Multivan Broadcast Corporation (which won the bid for the Vancouver multicultural licence in 2002 against Rogers and launched CHNM-TV).

On June 28, 2007, Rogers made public its offer to sell the religious-licensed Omni stations in Winnipeg and Vancouver as part of its contemporaneous purchase of Citytv (which the CRTC ordered CTVglobemedia to sell them off as part of the CHUM Limited takeover deal). Rogers indicated, however, that it viewed retaining the multilingual licences in Toronto, Calgary and Edmonton (effectively creating twinsticks in those three markets) as compatible with CRTC policy, since they are licensed to serve a different programming niche than the general interest Citytv stations.

On July 7, Rogers announced an agreement to purchase the aforementioned CHNM, finally securing a true multicultural television licence in Vancouver. The fact that Rogers had acquired the Calgary and Edmonton multicultural licences, beating out Multivan's competing applications, was cited as a major reason for the sale.

On September 28, the CRTC approved Rogers' takeover of the Citytv stations, giving the company one year to divest itself of the religious Omni stations. A tentative deal to sell the stations to S-VOX, owner of VisionTV, was announced on November 6. On March 31, 2008, the CRTC approved both Rogers' acquisition of CHNM and its sale of CIIT and CHNU to S-VOX. CHNU was rebranded as "CHNU 10" on October 31, 2007, a year before the Omni brand was transferred to CHNM. CIIT was rebranded "CIIT11" in July 2008, after S-VOX took control of the station. Both stations rebranded as Joytv on September 1, 2008; CHNM rebranded as "Omni BC" on the same date. The two new stations in Calgary and Edmonton launched on September 15, 2008 under the call letters CJCO and CJEO.

=== Partnership with ICI Montreal, cutbacks ===
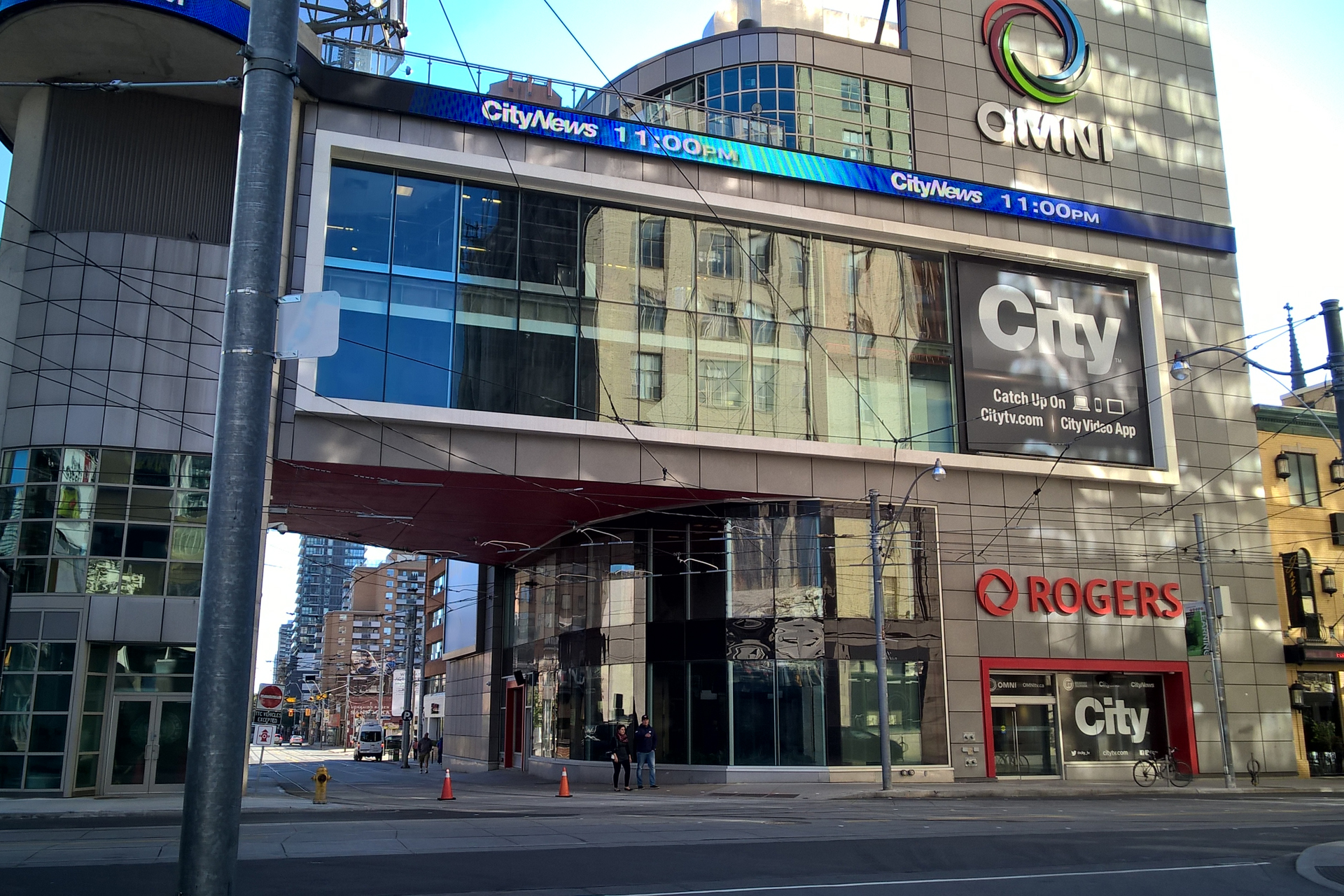
The exterior of 33 Dundas Street East, which houses operations for the Toronto Omni stations until 2025.

Rogers announced an agreement to acquire the one Canadian multicultural television station it did not already own, CJNT-DT Montreal on May 3, 2012, from Channel Zero, after having passed on the opportunity when the station was previously put up for sale in 2009 by Canwest during its financial difficulties. While intending to relaunch it as a Citytv station, Rogers did not rule out the possibility of requesting that CJNT be re-licensed as an English-language station, but in the meantime CJNT aired Omni programs (including Omni News) to fulfill much of its ethnic programming requirements after it became affiliated with Citytv prior to the sale. As part of the sale, Rogers requested that the CRTC convert CJNT to an English-language station, on the condition that both Channel Zero and Rogers provide services and resources to CFHD-DT, International Channel/Canal International (ICI), a newly proposed, locally owned multicultural station. Both were approved by the CRTC on December 20, 2012. ICI officially launched on December 11, 2013.

In the mid-2010's, the Omni stations struggled financially; Rogers Media president Keith Pelley explained that between 2011 and 2014, advertising revenue had fallen from CA$80 million to CA$35 million. On May 30, 2013, Rogers announced the shutdown of production facilities at CJCO and CJEO, ending the production of local programming and news content from the Omni Alberta stations, and as a result, the discontinuation of the South Asian newscasts. On May 7, 2015, Rogers announced further cuts affecting Omni, including the re-structuring of the Omni News programs, the cancellation of V-Mix and Bollywood Boulevard, and the elimination of redundancy in technical staff between the Omni and Citytv stations.

=== Licensing as a must-carry specialty channel ===
Omni Regional ICI Quebec
- Country: Canada
- Broadcast area: National, through regional feeds
- Headquarters: Toronto, Ontario

Programming
- Picture format: 480i (SDTV); 1080i (HDTV)

Ownership
- Owner: Rogers Sports & Media

History
- Launched: September 1, 2017

On June 14, 2016, Rogers announced that it had submitted an application to the CRTC for a new, national specialty channel known as Omni Regional. The service would consist of four feeds; "Pacific", "Prairies", "East", and "ICI Quebec", which mirror the programming of the corresponding Omni Television O&O and affiliate stations in their respective regions (Vancouver, Calgary, Toronto, and Montreal). The East feed specifically mirrors CJMT (Omni.2), which primarily focuses on the south and east Asian communities. CFMT (Omni.1), which focuses on European and Latin American communities, retains its existing distribution in southern and eastern Ontario. Rogers also sought 9(1)(h) must-carry status for the service.

Colette Watson, Rogers' vice president of television, stated that Omni Television was "not sustainable in its current state"; the company stated that must-carry status for the Omni Regional channels would result in an additional $14 million in annual revenue from carriage fees, which it planned to mostly invest into the production of daily half-hour national newscasts in the Cantonese, Italian, Mandarin, and Punjabi languages—programming that had been cancelled in 2015 in the previous round of cuts. Omni also pledged to increase its investments in original domestic content.

With reservations, CRTC approved Rogers' application for Omni Regional on May 15, 2017, and granted it must-carry status under a provisional three-year term. This requires the service to be offered on the lowest tier of service by all Canadian digital television providers. In regions where Omni already operates terrestrially, providers may be relieved from carrying the Omni Regional version of the service on their lineups, or vice versa. Omni Regional launched on September 1, 2017.

==== Call for applications and 2020 renewal ====
In its approval, the CRTC felt that Omni Regional's business model was financially unsustainable, as there were no significant plans for new original programming beyond newscasts, and Rogers did not sufficiently demonstrate that the service would "ensure a sufficient reflection of Canada's third-language communities", as its structure did not sufficiently serve regions not currently served by an Omni station (such as Atlantic and Central Canada). As such, the CRTC recognized that there was "[an] exceptional need for a national, multilingual multi-ethnic programming service that can provide Canadians with news and current events programming in multiple languages from a Canadian perspective", and formally requested applications for a national, multicultural specialty service that would receive must-carry status.

The CRTC announced the eight applicants on April 17, 2018, which included competing proposals by companies such as Bell Media, the Corriere Canadese, and Ethnic Channels Group among others. Rogers proposed maintaining the existing Omni Regional structure, but with an increased investment in original scripted and factual programming, the addition of Arabic, Hindi, and Tagalog-language newscasts, local newscasts on the East, Pacific, and Prairies feeds in Mandarin and Punjabi, and a local newscast in Italian on the East feed (which would replace the Italian national newscast, as the majority of Canada's Italian population lives in Ontario and Quebec).

In May 2019, the CRTC approved Rogers' application, granting Omni Regional a three-year license renewal taking effect September 1, 2020. Changes included that at least 70% of the broadcast day and 70% of primetime must be devoted to Canadian productions, and at least 12 hours of programming per-week must be acquired from independent producers (including at least two hours per-week of programming reflecting the Atlantic provinces, and two hours reflecting Manitoba and Saskatchewan). The number of daily national newscasts expanded to six, and there will be six hours per-week of local news programming for Calgary/Edmonton, Toronto, and Vancouver. Programming must be governed by advisory panels for each region, and Rogers must maintain the Omni broadcast stations during the services' license terms. The service must also be operated on a break-even basis, with all additional profit re-invested into its operations. Rogers is only allowed to solicit advertising in the regions of the existing Omni broadcast stations.

The decision to maintain Rogers' service was controversial; Montreal Gazette media analyst Steve Faguy noted that the CRTC's decision contained no discussion of any of the other applicants, which he considered "shocking". In June 2019, the Corriere Canadese sent a letter to the cabinet requesting an appeal of the CRTC's decision, citing that the Commission ignored "widespread and intense dissatisfaction" with Rogers and Omni "in respect of its minimal conditions of license for Omni Regional to serve the multi-lingual multi-ethnic community of Canadians". The complaint pointed out the CRTC's previous disagreement with the structure of Omni Regional upon its initial approval, and argued that the new proposal also weakened Omni's mandates to provide ethnic news and public affairs programming (replacing four hour-long programs in specific languages with six half-hour programs in non-specific third languages). It argued that "the CRTC choice is an affront to its original Call for a unique service, to the objectives of the Broadcasting Act and to the constitutionality of the principles of equality inherent in the Multiculturalism Act."

Independent Community Television Montreal (ICTV)—who had proposed a service known as Tele1—also requested an appeal, accusing CRTC commissioners Ian Scott and Caroline J. Simard of having "communicated independently with representatives of Rogers and Bell on multiple occasions and without notice to ICTV", resulting in an unfair process.

In August 2019, the Federal Court of Appeal dismissed the case, and the CRTC's decision was upheld by the Department of Canadian Heritage.

== Programming ==
All Rogers-owned Omni stations are licensed to air programming in no fewer than 20 languages to communities encompassing at least 20 cultures—ethnic programming comprises 60% of the Omni stations' schedules. The Toronto-based Omni stations are differently licensed with respect to the languages and communities they serve: CFMT airs programming for European and Caribbean language communities, while CJMT airs programming for the Pan-Asian and Pan-African audiences. Since 2019, Omni Television has carried the Eurovision Song Contest.

Omni stations formerly scheduled a limited amount of English-language entertainment programming aimed at mainstream audiences, such as syndicated sitcoms, talk shows, and game shows, as well as CBS's late-night talk shows (primarily Late Show with David Letterman, and The Late Late Show under Tom Snyder and the majority of Craig Ferguson's run). The Omni stations do not typically air primetime programs simulcast from U.S. networks, but Omni occasionally served as an overflow channel for Citytv after Rogers' purchase of the network—allowing them to maintain their simsub rights in its duopoly markets. As of the 2015–16 television season, all of these programs have been dropped, and nearly all of the Omni stations' schedules are devoted exclusively to ethnic programming.

While under Rogers ownership, CHNU and CIIT aired many of the same types of programs as CFMT and CJMT, despite the difference in the nature of service of multicultural and religious stations. CHNU and CIIT had previously aired many of the same types of syndicated sitcoms and multicultural programs shown regularly on the Omni stations in Toronto, and the Toronto stations carried some religious teaching programs. The common brand allowed cost savings for promotions and for the acquisition of the general-entertainment programs that all of the Omni stations had used to generate most of their revenues. However, due in particular to Vancouver multicultural station CHNM (while under Multivan ownership) and Toronto religious station CITS, which both opposed Rogers's acquisition of Trinity's religious stations, the Omni stations' core formats remained intact.

=== Sports ===
Omni Television stations have occasionally aired sporting events in minority languages, and in English as an overflow for Citytv or Sportsnet. Prior to their move to Citytv and the eventual acquisition of late games by CTV, the Omni stations aired late-afternoon NFL games for a period, and in the 2014 season, simulcast selected Thursday Night Football games from CBS (which also aired on Sportsnet). During the 2010 Winter Olympics in Vancouver and 2012 Summer Olympics in London, Omni stations broadcast coverage of the games in minority languages as part of the CTV/Rogers consortium.

On June 27, 2013, CJMT in Toronto broadcast Mandarin-language coverage of a Toronto Blue Jays Major League Baseball game started by Taiwanese player Chien-Ming Wang, marking the first ever Canadian MLB broadcast in the language.

Rogers acquired national media rights to the National Hockey League beginning in the 2014–15 NHL season; from 2014 through 2026, the Omni stations aired Hockey Night in Canada: Punjabi Edition, which featured Punjabi-language telecasts of NHL games on Saturday nights, and selected playoff games. The Punjabi broadcasts were carried over from the CBC's past digital coverage of games in the language.

Beginning in the later half of the 2018 season, and expanding into the 2019 season, Omni carried a regular schedule of Sunday-afternoon Blue Jays games in Tagalog.

=== News ===
Prior to its rebranding as Omni 1 in 2002, CFMT aired news in Portuguese, Italian and Cantonese from Monday to Friday, with a Mandarin program on the weekend. With the launch of CJMT (branded as Omni 2), a South Asian news program in English was introduced, and Mandarin was expanded from weekends only to Monday to Friday newscasts.

CHNM, or Omni British Columbia, was branded as Channel M prior to its purchase by Rogers in 2008. As Channel M, and after being bought by Rogers, CHNM produced a national newscast in Punjabi, as well as Cantonese and Mandarin. Omni Alberta also produced newscasts in Cantonese and Mandarin, as well as an English language South Asian newscast, from its launch in 2008 until 2011. The programs featured coverage of Canadian news stories in the language, along with stories from foreign broadcasters in countries in which the language is natively spoken (or the Indian subcontinent, in the case of the Punjabi edition).

On May 7, 2015, Rogers announced a restructuring of Omni News programs as part of cutbacks that led to the loss of 110 jobs across the company. The existing newscasts would by replaced by new public affairs-oriented programs produced in Cantonese, Mandarin and Punjabi. The new programs featured in-depth discussion of local issues, and did not feature original news reporting. Colette Watson, Rogers' vice president of television, explained that the decision to drop the newscasts was financially motivated; the newscasts only brought in CA$3.9 million in advertising revenue per-year, but had production expenses of CA$9 million.

Rogers' decision to drop ethnic newscasts resulted in criticism by Julian Fantino, Member of Parliament for Vaughan, who described the loss of Italian-language news coverage to be "devastating"; Vaughan has a notably large population of Italians, Following an unsatisfactory response by the company, Fantino called upon Rogers representatives to appear before the Standing Committee on Canadian Heritage.

As part of the Omni Regional service, Rogers reinstated half-hour national newscasts in the Cantonese, Italian, Mandarin and Punjabi languages. In September 2020, Arabic and Filipino newscasts were added.

Meanwhile, Rogers subcontracted production of Omni's new Chinese-language newscasts to Fairchild Media Group, owner of the Cantonese Fairchild TV and Mandarin Talentvision channels. Unifor and community groups questioned whether this arrangement was in compliance with Omni Regional's CRTC license, which stated that the service would "produce and broadcast" half-hour national newscasts in multiple languages, but leaving it unclear whether they must be produced by the licensee itself. They also cited concerns over Fairchild's news coverage having historically skewed conservative. Rogers defended the partnership as compliant with the license, and stated that they had editorial control over the programs. Unifor stated that it would file a grievance and a complaint with the CRTC over this agreement. The CRTC dismissed the complaint in April 2018, ruling that "produce" was broadly defined to allow for subcontracting, and that Rogers' editorial control (including limits on content sharing with newscasts on Fairchild's own channels) were sufficient as to not reduce the diversity of voices.

== Omni Television stations ==
=== Owned-and-operated stations ===
City of licence/market	Station	Channel TV (RF)
Calgary, Alberta	CJCO-DT	38.1 (38)
Edmonton, Alberta	CJEO-DT	56.1 (44)
Toronto, Ontario	CFMT-DT	47.1 (47)
Toronto, Ontario	CJMT-DT	69.1 (51)
Vancouver, British Columbia	CHNM-DT	42.1 (20)

=== Secondary carriers ===
City of licence/market	Station	Channel TV (RF)	Year of affiliation	Owner
Montreal, Quebec	CFHD-DT	47.1 (47)	2013	4517466 Canada Inc. (Norouzi Family)

=== High definition ===
In the fall of 2004, Omni launched high definition simulcasts of both Toronto stations, CFMT and CJMT. However, at the time both stations were only available through digital cable. In the summer of 2008, both stations began broadcasting digitally over-the-air. In December 2009, CHNM began broadcasting an over-the-air digital signal and broadcasts in standard definition.
