= Joytv =

Canadian television system

- Type: Broadcast television system
- Country: Canada

Ownership
- Owner: ZoomerMedia

History
- Launched: September 1, 2008
- Closed: August 2013

Links
- Website: www.joytv.ca

Joytv was a Canadian television brand owned by ZoomerMedia. Joytv was formerly a television system formed in September 2008, comprising two religious independent stations acquired from Rogers Media by S-VOX. The stations carried a mixture of multi-faith religious programming, as well as secular, family-oriented entertainment programming.

Joytv was dismantled as a television system in August 2013 by the re-launch of its Winnipeg station, CIIT-TV, as "Hope TV"—a traditional religious station with no secular programming. The Joytv brand and format is still used by sister station CHNU-TV in Fraser Valley/Vancouver, British Columbia.

== History ==
The Joytv system launched on September 1, 2008, and consisted of two existing television stations, CHNU-TV in Fraser Valley, British Columbia (also serving Vancouver) and CIIT-TV in Winnipeg, Manitoba. Both stations were acquired by S-VOX from Rogers Media in April 2008.

The stations had previously been branded as part of Rogers' Omni Television system prior to their purchase by S-VOX. Rogers rebranded CHNU as CHNU 10 in the fall of 2007, because the company's contemporaneous purchase of the multilingual station CHNM-TV meant that the Omni brand would eventually be moved to that station, but retained the Omni brand on CIIT. After the S-VOX purchase was finalized in the summer of 2008, CIIT was briefly rebranded as "CIIT 11" until the Joytv launch.

In June 2009, S-VOX announced it would sell its broadcasting assets, including Joytv, to ZoomerMedia, a company controlled by Moses Znaimer. The sale was approved by the CRTC on March 30, 2010. ZoomerMedia assumed control of the Joytv system on June 30, 2010.

The system was dismantled in late August 2013 when CIIT was rebranded as HopeTV (since changed to its current brand of FaithTV) and all secular programming was dropped from the schedule. The Joytv brand continues to exist on CHNU Vancouver.

== Television stations ==
City of licence/market	Station	Channel TV (RF)	Notes
Fraser Valley, British Columbia (serves Vancouver, Victoria, Penticton and Kelowna).	CHNU-DT	66.1 (47)	
Winnipeg, Manitoba	CIIT-DT	35.1 (35)	Until August 2013, now brands as FaithTV

== See also ==
- Yes TV, a Christian-based religious television system with similarly styled religious and secular programming, with affiliates in the provinces of Ontario and Alberta
