= CHNM-DT =

Television station in Vancouver

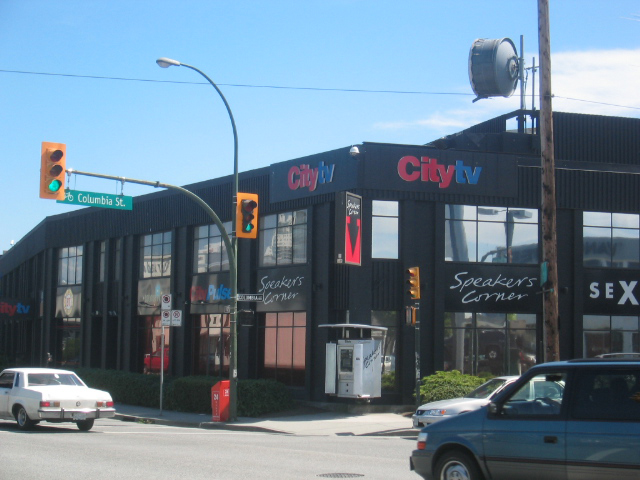
- CHNM's studios at 180 West 2nd Avenue in Vancouver.
- Vancouver, British Columbia; Canada
- Channels: Digital: 20 (UHF); Virtual: 42
- Branding: Omni Television

Programming
- Affiliations: 42.1: Omni Television

Ownership
- Owner: Rogers Sports & Media; (Rogers Media Inc.)
- Sister stations: TV: CKVU-DT, Sportsnet Pacific; Radio: CJAX-FM, CKKS-FM

History
- First air date: June 27, 2003
- Former call signs: CHNM-TV (2003–2011)
- Former channel numbers: Analog: 42 (UHF, 2003–2011)
- Former affiliations: Multicultural Independent (2003–2008)
- Call sign meaning: Channel M (former branding); Channel Multicultural

Technical information
- Licensing authority: CRTC
- ERP: 8.3 kW
- HAAT: 670 m (2,198 ft)
- Transmitter coordinates: 49°21′13″N 122°57′24″W
- Repeaters: CHNM-DT-1 29 Victoria (2.75 kW, 99.6 m HAAT)

Links
- Website: www.omnitv.ca

CHNM-DT (channel 42) is a multicultural television station in Vancouver, British Columbia, Canada, part of the Omni Television network. It is owned and operated by Rogers Sports & Media alongside Citytv station CKVU-DT (channel 10). The two stations share studios at the corner of West 2nd Avenue and Columbia Street (near False Creek) in the Mount Pleasant neighbourhood of Vancouver; CHNM-DT's transmitter is located atop Mount Seymour in the district municipality of North Vancouver.

== History ==
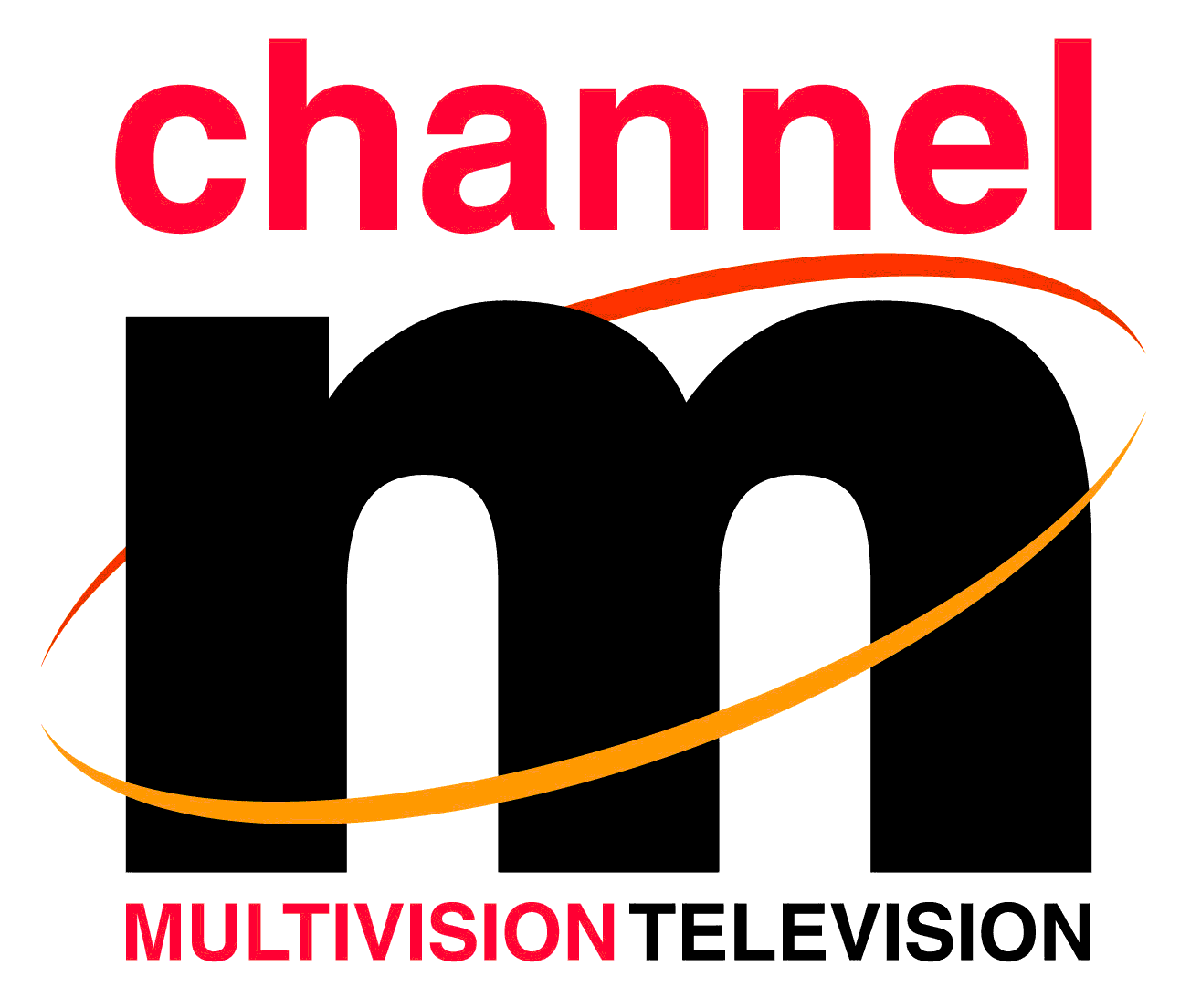
Logo used as channel m, used from June 27, 2003, to August 31, 2008.

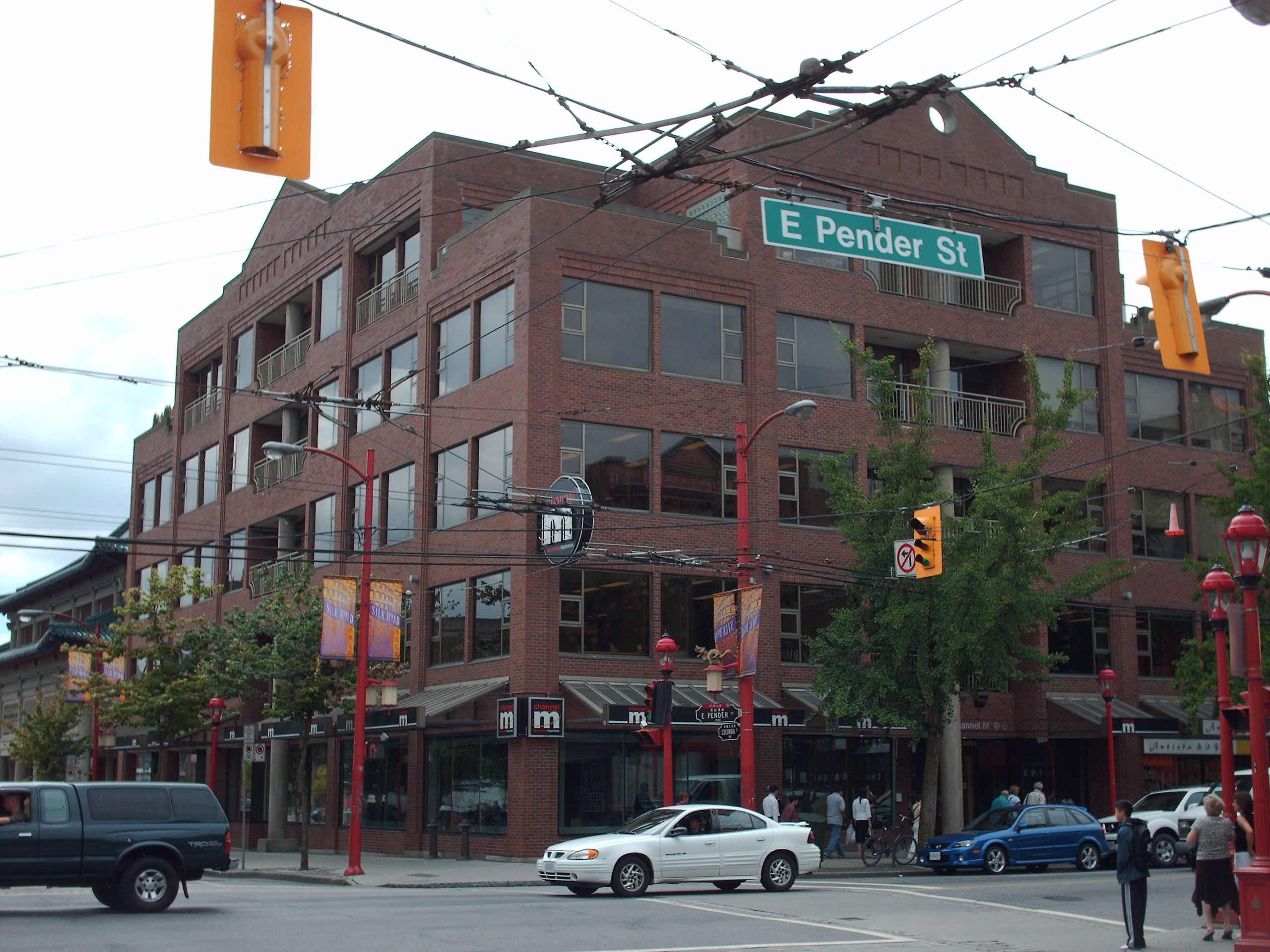
Omni BC's former studio building at the corner of Pender and Columbia Streets from June 27, 2003, until September 4, 2010.

Omni British Columbia Logos used from 2008 to 2018.

Rogers Communications had made several attempts to launch a multicultural station in Vancouver similar to its successful CFMT in Toronto. Unsuccessful applications to the Canadian Radio-television and Telecommunications Commission (CRTC) were made in 1996 (Note: CIVT (now a CTV station) was licensed instead.) and again in 1999. (Note: CIVI (now a CTV 2 station) and CHNU (now a Joytv station) were licensed.)

Asked by the federal cabinet to pursue the matter further, in 2002, the commission asked for new applications for a Vancouver multicultural station and received two—from Rogers and Multivan Broadcast, a newly formed consortium of local investors. The licence went to Multivan, with the CRTC citing its local ownership as one of the reasons for the decision. The station first signed on the air on June 27, 2003; branded on-air as "channel m", CHNM originally operated from studio facilities located at the intersection of Pender and Columbia Streets in Vancouver's Chinatown. In the mid-2000s, CHNM previously produced several station IDs and program promos using a diversity theme to capitalize on the station's former slogan "Diversity Lives Here", these including spots featuring Chinese lion dancers that emerge from their lion costume with their faces painted in orange and white, the colours of the BC Lions franchise of the Canadian Football League, along with slogans supporting the team; a South Asian dancer who performs her routine to the Channel M jingle, then breaks into a country and western dance; and a leather-clad Sikh motorcyclist who boards his bike to the Channel M jingle, arranged and performed in a style mixing ZZ Top-style blues rock with East Indian music.

Following a failed 2007 bid for the multicultural licences in Calgary and Edmonton, which were awarded to Rogers, Multivan announced an agreement to sell CHNM to Rogers in July of that year. The sale was approved by the CRTC on March 31, 2008, and was finalized on April 30, 2008. With Rogers' recent acquisition of Citytv station CKVU-TV (channel 10) and the resulting sale of religious station CHNU-TV (channel 66, formerly branded as "Omni.10") to S-VOX, the Omni Television brand moved to CHNM on September 1, 2008.

CHNM migrated its operations into sister station CKVU's studio facilities at 180 West 2nd Avenue (near the Vancouver Olympic Village) on September 7, 2010. That same year, CHNM won its first-ever Jack Webster Foundation Award for Excellence in Chinese Language Reporting, for a multi-part feature on the topic of earthquake preparedness.

== Programming ==
Along with carrying local newscasts, CHNM broadcasts predominantly multicultural programming and documentaries, including several independently produced magazine and entertainment programs made in-house. Formerly, these programs included German Today (German), Hola Que Tal (Spanish), Chai Time (Punjabi) (2006–2009), Mandarin Magazine (Mandarin Chinese) (2005–2009) and World Beats (an English language world music video program).

Until the beginning of the 2015–16 season, the station also aired a sizable amount of English-language American programming, including syndicated reruns of popular sitcom Two and a Half Men.

=== News operation ===
CHNM-DT presently broadcasts 12 1/2 hours of locally produced newscasts each week (with 2 1/2 hours each weekday); the station does not produce newscasts on weekends. The station airs daily newscasts in Cantonese, Mandarin and Punjabi, and in the past, Korean and Tagalog.

CHNM's newscasts were known as Channel M News from 2003 to 2008. During those years, the station also had a reciprocal agreement with CTV Vancouver, which allowed the two stations to share news resources. The station's newscasts were rebranded as Omni News in September 2008 following the approval of its sale to Rogers, and its news sharing agreement with CIVT was also terminated.

Cantonese newscasts have maintained a one-hour broadcast from their inception until 2010. It was initially broadcast at 8 pm, later changed to 9 p.m. and then to 5 p.m. on March 29, 2010. On May 17, 2010, a half-hour Cantonese late-night news was added at 11 p.m. On January 20, 2013, the late-night news was moved to 8:30 p.m.

Mandarin and Punjabi newscasts were each given half an hour at the beginning, and were later extended to one hour each on September 3, 2007.

On November 7, 2011, Omni BC's newscasts were reduced to 30 minutes due to launch of Omni national newscasts and were aired right after the national newscasts.

On January 20, 2013, Omni's national newscasts in Cantonese and Mandarin were cancelled due to budget cuts.

On May 7, 2015, Rogers announced a restructuring of Omni News programs as part of cutbacks that led to the loss of 110 jobs across the company. The existing newscasts would be replaced by new public affairs-oriented programs produced in Cantonese, Mandarin, and Punjabi on May 11. The new programs featured in-depth discussion of local issues but did not feature original news reporting.

The station also produced weekly phone-in programs in Cantonese, Mandarin, and Punjabi under Multivan ownership; these programs were cancelled after the station was rebranded as Omni in September 2008. In September 2012, CHNM began operating a news bureau in Victoria; the team includes bureau chief and political expert Kim Emerson.

== Technical information ==
=== Subchannel ===
Subchannel of CHNM-DT
| Channel | Res. | Short name | Programming |
|---|---|---|---|
| 42.1 | 1080i | CHNM-DT | Omni Television |

=== Analog-to-digital conversion ===
CHNM began broadcasting its digital signal on December 17, 2009, operating at reduced power. On February 12, 2010, the CRTC approved an application to increase CHNM-DT's maximum effective power to 8.3 kilowatts. The station initially broadcast its digital signal in the 4:3 picture format (480p upconverted to 1080i), it was converted to the 16:9 format and 1080i resolution on April 26, 2011. CHNM shut down its analog signal, over UHF channel 42, on August 31, 2011, the official date on which Canadian television stations in CRTC-designated mandatory markets transitioned from analog to digital broadcasts. The station's digital signal remained on its pre-transition UHF channel 20, using virtual channel 42. The station flash cut its Victoria transmitter from analog to digital prior to August 31, 2011.

== See also ==
- 2007 Canada broadcast TV realignment
