= S-VOX Foundation =

Canadian media organization

- Company type: Non-profit company
- Industry: Foundation/Charity
- Founded: 1998
- Defunct: 2010
- Headquarters: Toronto, Ontario, Canada
- Key people: Andrea Nemtin, President & CEO
- Products: Youth and spirituality/pluralism

S-VOX Foundation was a Canadian non-profit media organization dedicated to producing content on spirituality.

The organization is the successor to the non-profit entity that operated VisionTV, and later other related Canadian speciality channels, from 1988 to 2010. In June 2009, the company announced it would sell its broadcasting assets to ZoomerMedia, a company controlled by Moses Znaimer. The sale was approved by the CRTC on March 30, 2010. ZoomerMedia assumed control of S-VOX's broadcasting assets on June 30, 2010.

After the sale of VisionTV, S-VOX's board of directors undertook to use the funds to found the Inspirit Foundation. Inspirit is a national grant-making organization that supports Canadians, particularly young adults, in building a more inclusive and pluralistic society. One way the foundation does this is by funding initiatives that foster engagement and exchange between young Canadians of different secular, spiritual and religious beliefs.
