= Media in Kelowna =

This is a list of media in Kelowna, British Columbia.

== Radio ==
Frequency	Call sign	Branding	Format	Owner	Notes
1150 AM	CKFR	AM 1150	news/talk	Vista Radio	
88.9 FM	CBTK-FM	CBC Radio One	public news/talk	Canadian Broadcasting Corporation	English
89.7 FM	CBU-FM-3	CBC Music	public music	Canadian Broadcasting Corporation	English; relays CBU-FM Vancouver
90.5 FM	CBUF-FM-2	Ici Radio-Canada Première	public news/talk	Canadian Broadcasting Corporation	French; relays CBUF-FM Vancouver
96.3 FM	CKKO-FM	K96.3	classic rock	Stingray Radio	
99.9 FM	CHSU-FM	99.9 Sun FM	Top 40 (CHR)	Vista Radio	
101.5 FM	CILK-FM	Go FM 101.5	adult contemporary	Vista Radio	
103.1 FM	CKQQ-FM	103.1 Beach Radio	adult hits	Jim Pattison Group	
103.9 FM	CKOV-FM	OV 103.9	70's hits	Jim Pattison Group	
104.7 FM	CKLZ-FM	104.7 The Lizard	active rock	Jim Pattison Group	

== Television ==
Kelowna is not designated as a mandatory market for digital television conversion. All broadcasting stations broadcast only in analogue.

OTA Virtual channel	DTV channel	Cable channel	Call sign	Network	Notes
2.1	27	4	CHBC-DT	Global Okanagan	Schedule same as CHKL except for local newscasts at 5:30, 6:30, and 11:00pm daily.
5.1	24	8	CHKL-DT	Global BC	Relays CHAN-DT Vancouver; carries all Global BC programming.

See Digital television in Canada for information relating to the transition to HDTV in Canada.

== Print ==
- The Daily Courier: daily newspaper
- Kelowna Capital News: free community newspaper, published once weekly

== Online ==
- Castanet
- Kelowna Now
- Infotel
