= CKGO =

Traffic radio station in Vancouver (1955–2025)

- Vancouver, British Columbia; Canada
- Broadcast area: Greater Vancouver
- Frequency: 730 kHz

Programming
- Format: all-traffic reports (2006—2024)

Ownership
- Owner: Corus Entertainment; (Corus Premium Television Ltd.)
- Sister stations: CKNW, CFOX-FM, CFMI-FM, CHAN-DT, Global News: BC 1

History
- First air date: February 3, 1955
- Last air date: February 24, 2025 (70 years and 21 days)
- Former call signs: CKLG (1955–2001); CJNW (2001–2002); CHMJ (2002–2022)
- Former frequencies: 1070 kHz (1955–1958)
- Call sign meaning: "Go" (referencing to its previous traffic format)

Technical information
- Class: B
- Power: 50,000 watts
- Transmitter coordinates: 49.1335°N 123.004587°W

CKGO (730 AM) was a radio station in Vancouver, British Columbia. Owned by Corus Entertainment, the station served as a rebroadcaster of sister station CKNW from 2024 to 2025. CKGO transmits with a power output of 50,000 watts, the maximum for Canadian AM stations. It uses a directional antenna at all times to protect other stations on 980 AM from interference. Its transmitter is situated off British Columbia Highway 17 in Delta.

The station was originally established in 1955 as CKLG, under which it broadcast a popular contemporary hit radio format. Its popularity waned in the 1990s due to competition from FM stations; after its sale to Shaw Communications (who later spun off its media properties as Corus), the station briefly flipped to all-news radio in 2001 as a brand extension of newly-acquired sister station CKNW. In May 2002, the station flipped to hot talk as Mojo 730; in 2004, Mojo segued to a sports talk format. In June 2006, Corus dropped Mojo in favour of a format concentrating primarily on traffic reports, although it continued to carry sports play-by-play rights.

In June 2024, CKGO was closed by Corus Entertainment as part of company-wide cuts, and began to simulcast CKNW for a transitional period. CKNW's programming and call letters were permanently moved to CKGO's signal on February 24, 2025, with Corus citing 730's better signal coverage in downtown Vancouver and the Lower Mainland as the reason for the move.

== Format ==
From November 2006 until June 2024, the station had an all-day, every day "all traffic" format, becoming the first station in North America to do so. In addition to traffic reports, the station also aired news briefs, weather reports and commercials.

It also carried Vancouver Whitecaps MLS soccer games and pre-game shows.

== History ==
=== CKLG ===
On February 3, 1955, CKLG, owned by Lions Gate Broadcasting Ltd., began transmitting at 1070 kHz on the AM band with a 1,000-watt transmitter. Originally, studios and transmitter were both located in North Vancouver. The radio station was controlled by Gordon Gibson Sr. and his family, who were involved in the logging business. (Gordon Gibson Sr. was known as "The Bull of the Woods").

In 1958, the station changed frequencies from 1070 kHz to 730 kHz and increased power to 10,000 watts. The transmitter site was moved from North Vancouver to Delta. The station was sold to Moffat Broadcasting Ltd. in 1961, and in 1964, launched an FM sister station, the original CKLG-FM (now CFOX-FM), at 99.3 MHz. Throughout the 1960s, 1970s, and 1980s, CKLG (also known as LG73) played a variety of contemporary music, at times ranking as one of the most popular radio stations in the Vancouver radio market. In 1975, the station once again increased power, raising it to the current 50,000 watts. In 1984, CKLG began broadcasting in AM stereo using the Kahn-Hazeltine C-QUAM system. Later it switched to the Motorola system.

The station's popularity declined in the early 1990s, as listeners switched to FM radio for music listening. In 1992, Shaw Radio (now Corus Entertainment) purchased Moffat's Vancouver radio properties. Shaw tried a brief and unsuccessful attempt at a talk radio format from September 1993 until February 23, 1994. The station flipped to a hot adult contemporary format, which lasted for the next seven years, despite new competition from station CKZZ-FM. CKZZ originally began as a rhythmic contemporary station in 1991 before moving towards a more mainstream contemporary hit radio format in 1996.

=== All-News CJNW ===
On February 1, 2001, CJNW flipped to all-news radio, and the station stopped broadcasting in AM stereo. Carrying the new call letters CJNW and the on-air branding "NW2", Corus marketed the station as a brand extension of its new sister station, news/talk CKNW (which Corus had acquired from Western International Communications in 2000). However, the new format was unsuccessful in the ratings, and abandoned after approximately 14 months.

=== Mojo Radio ===
MOJO Sports Radio

On May 28, 2002, at 5 a.m., CJNW discontinued the all-news format and began a nearly 2 1/2-month-long stunt of modern rock music, which also included a month of downtime for a transmitter site upgrade. On August 6, at 6 a.m., the station changed call letters once again to CHMJ, and flipped to a hot talk format branded as MOJO 730, Talk Radio for Guys, which was based on sister station CFMJ in Toronto.

When that format failed to attract a large enough audience, the station changed to a sports radio format in February 2004, branded as MOJO Sports Radio, AM 730. The station would compete primarily with CHUM's CKST Team 1040. It was the radio home of the Vancouver Giants junior hockey team, the Vancouver Whitecaps soccer team and other local sports events including UBC Thunderbirds and SFU Clansmen football and basketball games. It also carried Seattle Seahawks games from Seattle's KIRO. It was an ESPN Radio network affiliate and also shared some sports content with CKNW.

=== AM 730 ===
AM 730

On May 30, 2006, CHMJ terminated its sports radio format, switching to a stunt of a series of promotional content. The station re-launched at 7:30 a.m. on June 5, with a new format described as "continuous drive-time traffic and the best of talk". Programming consisted of continuous traffic reports during the morning and afternoon drive times and rebroadcasts of talk radio programming from CKNW. CHMJ also continued to provide play-by-play coverage of Vancouver Giants WHL hockey, Vancouver Whitecaps, and Seattle Seahawks NFL football. On November 26, 2006, CHMJ dropped the CKNW encores and began carrying traffic programming at all times, along with brief news and weather segments.

On July 3, 2016, CHMJ was knocked off the air temporarily by a fire that broke out in Burns Bog, where the station's transmitter site is located. The station was broadcast temporarily on the HD3 digital signal of sister station 101.1 CFMI-FM.

On April 8, 2021, Corus Entertainment announced it had acquired the radio broadcasting rights of the BC Lions of the Canadian Football League, and Vancouver Whitecaps FC of Major League Soccer, following Bell Media's decision to reformat CKST from sports to comedy. CHMJ will air games while sister station CKNW will air weekly programming related to the Whitecaps and BC Lions, in addition to an exclusive coaches' show.

On April 1, 2022, the station's call letters were changed to CKGO.

=== CKNW simulcast and closedown ===
On June 26, 2024, amid ongoing cuts by Corus Entertainment, CKGO ended its all-traffic format and flipped to a simulcast of CKNW. Corus stated that the simulcast was an interim measure, and that it would ultimately only operate one news-talk AM station in Vancouver. On January 21, 2025, Corus announced that CKGO would close, and that the branding, programming, and call letters of CKNW would move to 730 beginning February 24, 2025. Corus stated that the move would improve CKNW's coverage in Downtown Vancouver and the Lower Mainland. The move echoes a frequency swap performed by Edmonton sister station CHED in 2024, whose sister station CHQT had been closed down in a similar manner to CKGO the same day. After CKNW's move to 730, the 980 frequency temporarily remained on the air to broadcast a looping promo advising listeners of the change, after which it went silent.

Corus returned the 980 licence to the CRTC on March 11, and the CRTC formally canceled it on May 15, 2025.
