= Jill Krop =

Canadian journalist

- Occupation: Journalist
- Partner: Dave Samson
- Children: 1

Jill Krop is a Canadian journalist and news broadcaster. Krop was News Director, Station Manager, and a news anchor for Global BC and a local radio personality.

== Biography ==
Krop was born in Edmonton, Alberta in 1963 and raised in British Columbia. She studied journalism at the British Columbia Institute of Technology and graduated with a BCIT Diploma of Technology in Broadcast Communications in 1986.

Krop started her career at CKPG in Prince George, followed by a year at CFRE in Regina. Following this, Krop worked at Atlantic Satellite Network (ASN) in Halifax for six years, hosting major newscasts and Breakfast Television. Krop was awarded a GOLD CANPRO* by ASN.

In 1995, she returned to British Columbia and joined British Columbia Television as a junior news anchor hosting the weekend morning and noon news. In September 2001, she began hosting News Hour Final, weeknights on Global BC. Krop was the host of Unfiltered on BC1 and anchored the Early News following Deborra Hope's retirement. Besides television, Krop works in radio as a relief talk show host on CKNW AM-980.

On April 10, 2015, Shaw Media announced that Krop had been appointed News Director and Station Manager for Global BC.

As master of ceremonies, Krop has hosted Influential Women in Business Awards, Gold Georgie Award Winners 2003, 2005 BC Export Awards Gala, Variety Club Show of Hearts and The Children's Miracle Network Telethon.

Krop has played small roles in television and film, usually as a TV reporter or news anchor.

== Personal life ==
Krop and her partner, Burnaby firefighter Dave Samson, had a son in 2008.
