= CKLG =

CKLG may refer to:

- CJAX-FM, a radio station (96.9 FM) licensed to Vancouver, British Columbia, Canada, which held the call sign CKLG-FM from 2002 to 2014
- CKGO, a radio station (730 AM) licensed to Vancouver, British Columbia, Canada, which held the call sign CKLG from 1955 to 2001
- CFOX-FM, a radio station (99.3 FM) licensed to Vancouver, British Columbia, Canada, which held the call sign CKLG-FM from 1964 to 1979
