= CKOO =

The callsign CKOO may represent:

- CKOO-FM 103.9, a radio station in Kelowna, British Columbia, Canada
- CHMP-FM 98.5, a radio station in Longueuil, Quebec, Canada that previously held these calls
- CJOR (AM) 1240, a radio station in Osoyoos, British Columbia that previously held these calls
