= CFMI =

CFMI may refer to:

- CFMI-FM, a radio station (101.1 FM) licensed to New Westminster, British Columbia, Canada
- CFM International, an aeronautical company
- CareFirst of Maryland, Inc., a BlueCross BlueShield health insurance provider.
- An acronym: Call For More Information
