= CHSU-FM =

Radio station in Kelowna

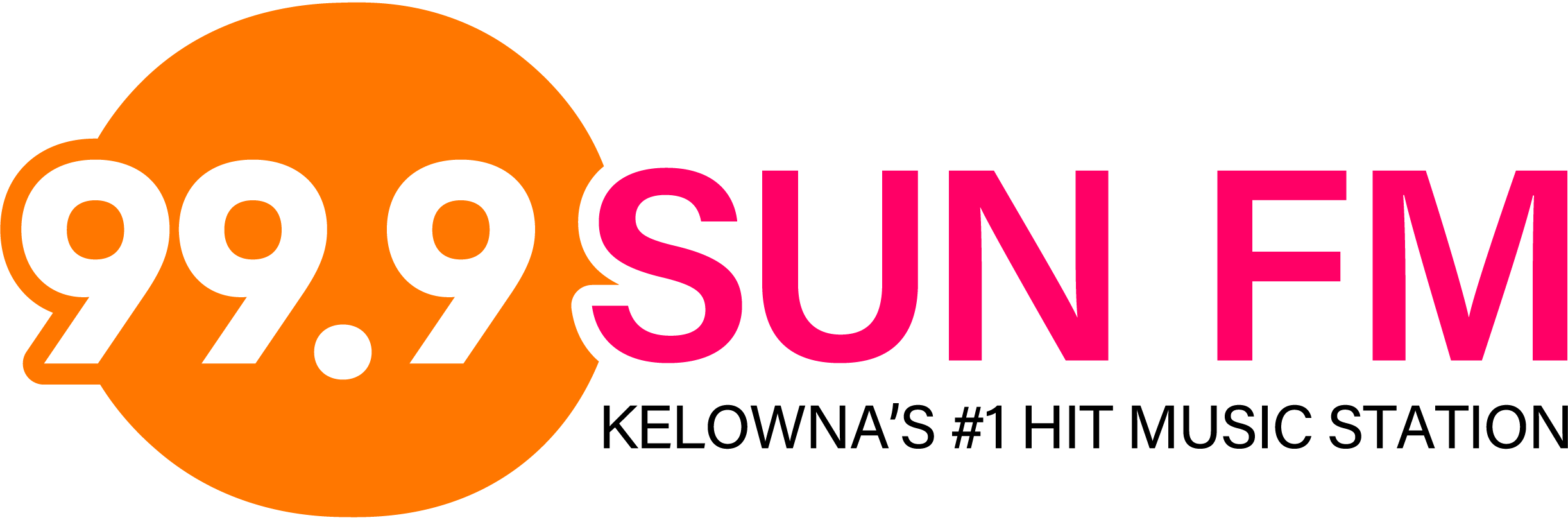
- Kelowna, British Columbia; Canada
- Broadcast area: Okanagan Valley
- Frequency: 99.9 MHz
- Branding: 99.9 Sun FM

Programming
- Format: Contemporary hit radio

Ownership
- Owner: Vista Radio
- Sister stations: CKFR; CILK-FM

History
- First air date: October 1995
- Call sign meaning: From "Sun" branding

Technical information
- Licensing authority: CRTC
- Class: B
- ERP: 11,000 watts average 35,000 watts peak horizontal polarization only
- HAAT: 114.5 metres (376 ft)
- Transmitter coordinates: 49°46′5.16″N 119°30′3.60″W

Links
- Webcast: Listen Live

CHSU-FM is a radio station, broadcasting at 99.9 FM in Kelowna, British Columbia, Canada. The station currently broadcasts a contemporary hit radio format branded as 99.9 Sun FM. The station is owned by Vista Radio.

== History ==
CHSU traces its origins to 1995, when the Canadian Radio-television and Telecommunications Commission (CRTC) granted Four Seasons Radio Ltd. a new FM licence for the Kelowna market offering country music. The station's initial call letters were CKBL and its branding was 99.9 The Bullet. It launched in October 1995, and was the sister station of CKIQ, a news/talk station on the AM band that was also owned by Four Seasons. In 1996, Okanagan Skeena Radio Group Ltd. acquired a number of stations in the Okanagan market when it bought out Four Seasons' parent company.

Logo as "99.9 Sun FM" used from 2011–2019

One year later, in 1997, 99.9 Sun FM replaced "The Bullet" by offering a hot adult contemporary format. Its call letters were changed to CHSU-FM as well. Simultaneously, CKIQ changed its call letters to CKBL, which meant the Kelowna market lost a news/talk station, leaving cross-town competitor CKOV (since early 2010, an FM station with the call letters CKQQ) as the sole station offering that format. CKBL continued to offer country music on the rebranded 1150 AM The Bullet.

In 1999, Telemedia acquired Okanagan Skeena Radio Group Ltd. along with other radio assets across the country. In 2002, Standard Broadcasting acquired Telemedia's radio assets. Standard later sold some stations in other provinces to various companies, but it has retained its British Columbia stations and CHSU continues to operate with the same format and branding.

Logo as "99.9 Virgin Radio" used from 2019–2025

In October 2007, Astral Media acquired Standard Broadcasting's terrestrial radio and television assets, including CHSU. Astral was in turn acquired by Bell Media.

On October 3, 2019, CHSU dropped its long-time "Sun" branding and relaunched as 99.9 Virgin Radio.

On February 8, 2024, Bell announced that it would sell 21 of its radio stations in British Columbia, including CHSU, to Vista Radio, pending CRTC approval. The application was approved on February 13, 2025. On April 14, 2025, as the Virgin Radio branding is licensed exclusively in Canada to Bell, Vista reinstated the "Sun FM" branding.

== Rebroadcasters ==
Rebroadcasters of CHSU-FM
City of licence	Identifier	Frequency	Power	Class	RECNet	CRTC Decision
Big White Ski Resort	CHSU-FM-1	98.1 FM	18 (Horizontal polarization only) watts	LP	Query	99-35
