= Jack Webster (Scottish-Canadian journalist) =

Canadian journalist

Jack Webster CM
- Born: John Edgar Webster; 15 April 1918; Glasgow, Scotland
- Died: 2 March 1999 (aged 80); Vancouver, British Columbia, Canada
- Years active: 1945–1999
- Known for: Journalist, talk radio host
- Spouse: Margaret Thomson MacDonald (m. 1939; died 1985)
- Children: 4

John Edgar Webster CM (15 April 1918 – 2 March 1999) was a Scottish-born Canadian journalist, radio, and television personality, regarded as "king of the Vancouver airwaves" from the 1950s to his retirement, in 1988.

== Early life ==
Webster was born in Glasgow, the son of a Clydeside ironturner. He left school at age 14 to enter into newspaper businesses as a teenager. He worked in Glasgow and on Fleet Street. When World War II broke out, Webster joined the British Army and rose to the rank of major, with most of his six years' service spent in the Middle East.

== Media career ==
After the war, Webster immigrated to Canada. He covered the labour beat for the Vancouver Sun newspaper. In 1953, he began to work on commercial radio in the talk radio format, which had its origins in British Columbia before it spread to the United States. Webster made his mark broadcasting shorthand transcripts of testimony during a probe into corruption on Vancouver's police force. His City Mike show on CJOR achieved some fame covering the issue.

He left CJOR and moved his show to CKNW. In the 1960s, he had 186,000 daily listeners and a $100,000 salary. In 1963, prisoners at the BC Penitentiary were foiled in an escape attempt and took hostages. At the prisoners' request, Webster acted as a mediator between hostage-holding prisoners and the authorities and helped resolve the stand-off.

In 1972, Jim Pattison lured Webster back to CJOR. Then in 1978, at the age of 60, Webster moved his radio show to television, where his familiar expression '9 am prrre-cisely' became his trademark. His hour-long TV interview program Webster!, which was seen weekdays at 9 am on BCTV and then-sister CHEK-TV and from 1986, at 5pm proceeding the nightly news hour on BCTV, frequently dealt with British Columbia politics. Shortly after the final BCTV show aired in April 1987, Webster and the TV station donated the videos for all nine years of his shows to the BC Archives.

In 1990, Webster joined the long-running CBC TV program Front Page Challenge as its permanent fourth panelist until the show's cancellation in 1995.

== Recognition ==
In 1987, he was inducted into the Canadian News Hall of Fame. In 1988, he was made a Member of the Order of Canada. In 2017, the 150th anniversary of Canada, Webster was profiled in Vancouver newspapers as one of the most notable 150 British Columbians.

== Jack Webster Foundation ==
In 1986, more than 1000 people attended a salute to Webster upon his retirement. This event resulted in the creation of the Jack Webster Foundation to promote and honour excellence in journalism in British Columbia. Each year, journalists judged to have outstanding work receive a Jack Webster Award (known as a "Webster"), a glass statue and a cash prize that has become the hallmark of journalistic excellence in British Columbia.

The awards have grown from a single "Reporter of the Year" in 1987 to thirteen awards today for best news, best feature and best community news reporting (print, radio, and TV awards in each of the three categories) as well as recognition for excellence in the categories of business reporting, science reporting, commentary, legal journalism, Chinese-language news, and the Bruce Hutchison Lifetime Achievement Award. The Foundation also awards fellowships and six annual student reporting awards.

== Works ==
- 1990 - Webster!: An Autobiography ISBN 0-88894-706-2
