= CKNW =

Radio station in Vancouver, Canada

- Vancouver, British Columbia; Canada
- Broadcast area: Greater Vancouver
- Frequency: 730 kHz
- Branding: 730 CKNW

Programming
- Format: Talk radio
- Affiliations: Global News; BC Lions; Vancouver Whitecaps FC

Ownership
- Owner: Corus Entertainment; (Corus Premium Television Ltd.)
- Sister stations: CFOX-FM, CFMI-FM, CHAN-DT, Global News: BC 1

History
- First air date: August 15, 1944; 82 years ago (in New Westminster, moved to Vancouver in 2025)
- Former frequencies: 1230 kHz (1944–1949); 1320 kHz (1949–1958); 980 kHz (1958–2025)
- Call sign meaning: New Westminster (original location)

Technical information
- Licensing authority: CRTC
- Class: B
- Power: 50,000 watts
- Transmitter coordinates: 49.161554°N 122.731892°W
- Repeater: 101.1 CFMI-HD2 and HD3 (Vancouver)

Links
- Webcast: Listen live
- Website: globalnews.ca/radio/cknw

CKNW (730 AM) is a commercial radio station in Vancouver, British Columbia. Owned by Corus Entertainment, it broadcasts a talk radio format. Its offices and studios are in the TD Tower in Downtown Vancouver.

CKNW transmits with 50,000 watts, the maximum for Canadian AM stations. It uses a directional antenna, with a three-tower array in the daytime and a four-tower array at night. It is a Class B station. Its transmitter is on British Columbia Highway 17 in Surrey.

The station originally broadcast on the frequency of 1230 kHz, before moving to 1320 kHz in 1949, and then 980 kHz in 1958. On June 26, 2024, as part of cuts by the company, Corus disbanded sister station CKGO's traffic radio format, and began simulcasting CKNW's programming on its 730 kHz frequency. In January 2025, Corus announced that CKNW would move permanently to CKGO's signal on February 24, 2025, citing its better downtown and Lower Mainland coverage.

== History ==
=== Bill Rea ownership ===
CKNW signed on the air for the first time on August 15, 1944. It was licensed to the Vancouver suburb of New Westminster, and operated from studios at the Hotel Windsor in New Westminster. Regular programming began on September 1. Its original frequency was 1230 kilocycles, under the ownership of Bill Rea's International Broadcasting Company. It was the first in the region to provide hourly newscasts (between 6:00 a.m. and midnight) and the first in the province to broadcast 24 hours a day, beginning in 1948. It later became the Vancouver area's first country station.

In 1947, Rea purchased a half-interest in Port Alberni radio station CJAV. Several personalities who started there would move to CKNW. These included Joe Chesney, who became morning show host until moving on to establish Langley station CJJC (now CKST in Vancouver) in 1963, and Jim Robson, who would provide play-by-play for the newly established Vancouver Canucks of the NHL beginning in 1970.

On January 2, 1949, CKNW switched frequencies to 1320 AM and increased its power from 250 watts to 1,000. CKNW again increased its power to 5,000 watts on November 5, 1954. Jack Webster was an early host of a call-in talk show during his time with CKNW in the 1960s.

=== WIC ownership ===
In February 1956, Bill Rea began experiencing health problems. He sold CKNW to Frank Griffiths and the Allard family, who went on to form Western Broadcasting Company, which later became Western International Communications (WIC). In February 1958, long time Creative Director Tony Antonias wrote a jingle that was introduced on CKNW in April 1958. It was used across western Canada for years for the famous Woodward's "$1.49 Day" sale (said aloud as "dollar forty-nine day") on the first Tuesday of every month.

On November 17, 1958, the station moved frequencies to 980 AM. On February 22, 1960, its transmission power was increased to 10,000 watts, and it was further increased to 50,000 watts in 1965. On January 15, 1969, CKNW moved into larger studio space in a former Safeway store in New Westminster.

CKNW added an FM station at 101.1 MHz with the call sign CFMI-FM. It signed on the air on March 22, 1970. (Today, CFMI carries CKNW's programming on its HD Radio subchannel.)

CKNW founder Bill Rea died on April 15, 1983, in Santa Barbara, California at age 74. On October 3, 1983, the station began broadcasting in AM stereo.

=== Western Information Network ===
On June 18, 1984, it became the flagship station of the Western Information Network, broadcasting programs via satellite to affiliate stations throughout British Columbia. During the World's Fair known as Expo 86, CKNW moved its Holiday Inn Hotel Talk studio to a new facility in the BC Pavilion Complex. CKNW broadcast on site for the duration of the fair. CKNW Talk programming aired from the Expo Studio until 1997.

In mid-December 1995, CKNW became the first commercial radio station in Canada to stream 24/7 over the internet.

During the 1990s, CKNW made a gradual transition from the mixed format of news, sports, talk shows and MOR music it had adopted in the 1960s to full-time news, talk and sports. In 1996, CKNW and CFMI moved again to their current studios in the TD Tower at Pacific Centre in Downtown Vancouver.

=== Corus ownership ===
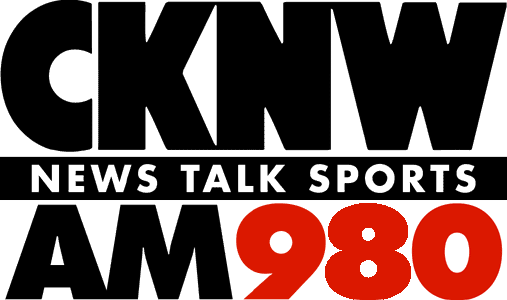
CKNW's logo until 2010.

In 2000, both CKNW and CFMI were purchased by Corus Entertainment as part of the splitting of WIC's broadcasting assets; Corus acquired WIC's radio stations and pay-TV assets while WIC's broadcast TV stations, including CHAN-DT (BCTV, now Global BC) in the Vancouver area, were purchased by Canwest. Canwest ultimately went bankrupt in 2010, selling the bulk of its broadcast properties including Global BC to Corus sibling company Shaw Communications, which in turn transferred them to Corus in 2016.

In February 2001, Corus Entertainment launched an all-news sister station, NW2. This new station (CJNW AM730, formerly CKLG) was branded as "24 hour news radio, powered by CKNW." NW2 shared newsroom resources with CKNW, including several anchors and reporters. However, NW2 did not achieve broad appeal, and was shut down in May 2002.

Since 2001, CKNW has gone through two significant restructurings focused on reducing costs, which resulted in dozens of lay-offs. Several senior reporters have left CKNW for other opportunities. The cost-cutting decisions made by Corus, along with the increase in infomercials, has correspondingly resulted in CKNW suffering a steady erosion of its listening audience.

In 2007, the Canadian Broadcast Standards Council faulted CKNW for airing "potentially dangerous information" during the 2006 Dawson College shooting. During the incident, CKNW had simulcast content from its sister stations in Montreal which included students speaking by cellphone from inside the school. A Vancouver man complained that the content could have told the gunman where the students were. The council said that as a result of modern technology reducing geographic distance as a barrier, CKNW had breached Section 10 (coverage of violent situations) of the broadcast code. The station broadcast the decision as required, but did not air an apology and the station manager said it was a "one-off situation" that would not affect CKNW's policies.

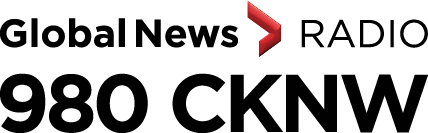
Global News Radio 980 CKNW logo until 2022.

CKNW lost broadcast rights for the BC Lions of the Canadian Football League to Team 1040 in 2004. The station had broadcast the games continuously since 1985. In 2006, CKNW lost the rights to broadcast Vancouver Canucks games to Team 1040 as well after broadcasting every one of the club's games since their inaugural NHL season in 1970. The loss of the Canucks games may have resulted in the station losing nearly a third of their cumulative audience in the Fall ratings of 2006.

In November 2015, CKNW's programming was added to sister station 101.1 CFMI-FM's HD Radio digital subchannel. It become the first AM station in British Columbia to broadcast on an HD subchannel.

On May 28, 2024, CKNW reacquired broadcast rights for the BC Lions, marking their return to CKNW after a 20-year absence.

=== Move to 730 ===
980 CKNW logo used until 2025.

On June 26, 2024, sister station 730 CKGO dropped its all-traffic format and became a full-time simulcast of CKNW as the result of ongoing cuts by Corus. The company stated that the simulcast was an interim measure and that it would ultimately only operate one news-talk AM station in Vancouver, but did not announce at that time whether it intended to return CKGO's license to the CRTC or sell the station.

In January 2025, Corus announced that CKNW's intellectual property, including its call letters and format, would move permanently to the 730 AM frequency on February 24, 2025. While both stations operate at the same power of 50 kilowatts, Corus stated that CKGO's facilities were newer, and that its signal had better coverage in Downtown Vancouver and the Lower Mainland. The frequency swap mirrors a move made by Corus in Edmonton, where CHED relocated to the frequency of CHQT. With this action, CKNW became a Vancouver station in name as well as in fact; it had remained licensed to New Westminster as late as its 2023 license renewal, long after moving its studios to Vancouver.

As part of the move, Corus moved the CKGO callsign to 980. After the frequency swap, 980 remained on the air to carry a looping promo advising listeners of the change, after which it went silent in mid-March. Corus returned the 980 license to the CRTC on March 11, and the CRTC formally canceled it on May 15.

As of July 7, 2026, CKNW is the only commercial news/talk/sports radio station in Vancouver with 50,000 watts of power, after CISL and CKWX shut down that day.

== Programming ==
CKNW has local talk shows on weekday mornings and afternoons. Hosts include Simi Sara (Mornings With Simi), Mike Smyth (The Mike Smyth Show), Jill Bennett (The Jill Bennett Show) and Jas Johal (The Jas Johal Show). Nights feature talk shows syndicated across Canada from Ben Mulroney (The Ben Mulroney Show), Rob Fai (Weekends with Rob Fai) and David Cooper (The Last Show with David Cooper).

CKNW's Global News department produces newscasts every hour. There are also weekday news blocks at 5 a.m. and on the weekends at 6 p.m.

Mark Madryga is CKNW's meteorologist. His weather reports can be heard during the morning news. Global BC's Kristi Gordon is the substitute forecaster.

The station's traffic department provides Vancouver traffic reports every 10 minutes on the 4s during morning and afternoon drive time and every half hour at other times.

== Former hosts and programs ==
Christy Clark hosted a weekday talk show on the station from 2007 to 2010, before returning to politics and becoming Premier of British Columbia. Her afternoon slot was taken over by Simi Sara. In 2020, Simi Sara moved to the morning slot, replacing Jon McComb.

Rafe Mair hosted a talk show on CKNW for 19 years, before being dismissed in 2003.

Dan Russell's "Sportstalk" was the longest running sports discussion show in Canada but ended on CKNW in September 2013. The show was revived on CISL radio briefly, before ending on that station on May 1, 2014.

Long time radio broadcaster Bill Good retired after nearly 26 years with CKNW on August 1, 2014.

Sean Leslie once hosted CKNW's weekend afternoon talk program (The Sean Leslie Show).

Drex hosted the talk show Drex Live from 2014 to 2018, before expanding it into the nationally syndicated The Shift with Drex in 2018. After Drex left the show in 2020, it was taken over by Shane Hewitt, who hosted until the show's cancellation in 2023.

CKNW once aired an American syndicated overnight talk show Coast to Coast AM and on weekends The Ted Radio Hour.
