= Harvey Oberfeld =

Canadian journalist

- Born: 4 March 1945 (age 81); Montreal, Quebec
- Citizenship: Canadian
- Education: Concordia University
- Occupation: Journalist

Harvey Oberfeld (born March 4, 1945) is a Canadian journalist. Now retired, he maintains a personal blog featuring personal anecdotes and opinion pieces about current events.

== Life and career ==
Born in Montreal, Quebec, he graduated in 1968 with a Bachelor of Arts degree from Sir George Williams University (now Concordia University) in Montreal. While attending university he was a reporter for The Georgian campus newspaper. His stories on the possible cancellation of the scheduled Youth Pavilion at Expo 67 for lack of adequate capital/operational funding led to wider media coverage and substantial new corporate contributions that saved the Pavilion; Oberfeld was appointed to the Youth Advisory Committee for Expo 67.

=== Print ===
After graduating, Oberfeld took his first daily newspaper job at the Saskatoon Star Phoenix, covering, among other stories, the early court appearances of David Milgaard who was wrongfully convicted for the 1969 murder of Saskatoon nursing student Gail Miller.

After moving to the Regina Leader-Post for two years, Oberfeld joined The Vancouver Sun in 1971, initially covering the Burnaby and then Vancouver city halls, and then becoming Sun's first regional affairs reporter, inaugurating full-time coverage of the Greater Vancouver Regional District as it assumed a larger role in regional services.

Oberfeld was promoted to the Sun's Victoria Bureau in 1974, covering the BC Legislature under the NDP government of Premier Dave Barrett and then the Social Credit government of Premier Bill Bennett.

=== Television ===
In 1979, Oberfeld joined BCTV's Legislative Bureau, making the switch to television during the station's "Golden Era" under News Director Cameron Bell and Assignment Editor Keith Bradbury. Their strategy of hiring accomplished newspaper reporters to bolster the flagship News Hour news program helped propel BCTV to the top of the ratings, a position it still holds under its new owners CanWest Global. Oberfeld was a key reporter in the station's coverage of British Columbia's "Dirty Tricks Scandal", which eventually saw eight B.C. government employees lose their jobs amidst allegations of election-boundary interference, phoney letters-to-the-editor and secret election-fund bank accounts.

In 1981, BCTV moved Oberfeld to Ottawa where he became the station's first full-time bureau chief during Prime Minister Pierre Elliott Trudeau's final term in office. He also covered Parliament Hill under Prime Ministers John Turner and Brian Mulroney. Oberfeld returned to Vancouver in 1989 where he did political and investigative reporting for BCTV / Global until he retired in 2006.

Oberfeld currently writes a blog called Keeping it real ... .

== Awards ==
During his career, Oberfeld won several regional and national journalism awards including:

- Canadian Association of Journalists' Award (1990) for Outstanding Investigative Reporting in Canada by a Regional Television station
- Webster Award for Best Reporting of the Year (1991-Television)
- Webster Award for Excellence In Legal Journalism (2004)
- Canadian Association of Broadcasters Gold Ribbon Award (1991) for a News Series
- Radio-Television News Directors Association of Canada Dan MacArthur Awards (1991- Regional and National)
- BC Association of Broadcasters Award (1996) for Best Reporting-Television
