= CFMI-FM =

Radio station in Vancouver, Canada

- Vancouver, British Columbia; Canada
- Broadcast area: Greater Vancouver
- Frequency: 101.1 MHz (HD Radio)
- Branding: Rock 101

Programming
- Format: Classic hits and classic rock
- Subchannels: HD2, HD3: CKNW

Ownership
- Owner: Corus Entertainment; (Corus Premium Television Ltd.)
- Sister stations: CKNW, CFOX-FM, CHAN-DT, Global News: BC 1

History
- First air date: March 22, 1970
- Call sign meaning: Station branded as "FM One", with I as the Roman numeral for One

Technical information
- Licensing authority: CRTC
- Class: C
- ERP: 53,000 watts; 100,000 watts peak
- HAAT: 368.4 metres (1,209 ft)
- Transmitter coordinates: 49.345°N 122.973°W

Links
- Website: rock101.com

CFMI-FM (101.1 MHz) branded as Rock 101, is a commercial radio station in Vancouver, British Columbia, with a format that combines classic hits and classic rock. It is owned by Corus Entertainment with studios in Downtown Vancouver, in the TD Tower.

CFMI is a Class C station with an effective radiated power (ERP) of 53,000 watts (100,000 watts peak). Its transmitter tower is atop Mount Seymour in the District of North Vancouver.

== History ==
CFMI signed on the air on March 22, 1970. It was owned by Radio NW, Ltd. and is the sister station to CKNW 980 AM. It originally was licensed to New Westminster, with studios on 8th and McBride. It began with a short-lived country format this was followed by easy listening music ("Pop for Adults").

In its early years, it was a technical innovator of broadcast automation systems. FM stereo automation systems of the day relied heavily on reel-to-reel tape machines for music. CFMI's automation had no reel machines, but relied totally on cartridge carousels. This allowed greater programming flexibility ("random access"), but no broadcast cartridges of the day could reproduce quality stereo. The response of CFMI's engineers was to invent a new cartridge that could: The Aristocart. Parent company Western International Communications went on to develop a manufacturing division, exporting these improved cartridges to broadcasters around the world. Today's broadcasters use computer systems with large hard drives to reproduce music digitally, and have no need of tape systems. But in its heyday (circa 1975-1990), the Aristocart was an improvement to a technical problem shared by all commercial stereo broadcasters.

Among CFMI's programming innovations was Discumentary, a one-hour musical documentary of programming featuring a particular artist or a particular theme. This was developed in response to the CRTC's requirement for foreground programming. The Discumentary programs were written by Paul Wiggins and voiced by Dave McCormick, then Terry David Mulligan and syndicated throughout Canada, and broadcast internationally on the Anik D satellite. Later, CRTC regulations phased out the need for foreground programming, and CFMI phased out Discumentary.

Over the years, the station added booster transmitters in most of British Columbia. After experiencing technical difficulties related to the location of its main transmitter, CFMI received Canadian Radio-television and Telecommunications Commission (CRTC) approval on July 26, 2011, to relocate that transmitter. The antenna's height above average terrain (HAAT) was reduced from 686 to 386.4 metres in the process. At the same time, its average effective radiated power (ERP) was increased from 37,000 to 53,000 watts (maximum ERP changing from 75,000 to 100,000 watts).

=== HD programming ===
On October 13, 2015, CFMI-HD was launched as the first Canadian HD service west of Ontario:

- HD2 carries sister station CKNW AM 980.
- HD3 carries sister station CKGO AM 730. (This began on July 3, 2016, due to damage to AM730's transmitter from the 2016 Burns Bog fire.)

== Rebroadcasters ==
CFMI also operates on a number of low-power FM transmitters.

=== Alberta ===
Rebroadcasters of CFMI-FM
City of licence	Identifier	Frequency	Power	Class	RECNet	CRTC Decision
Luscar	VF2213	96.5 FM	20 watts	LP	Query	CRTC 93-278
Rainbow Lake	VF2293	92.3 FM	10 watts	VLP	Query	CRTC 95-704

=== British Columbia ===
Rebroadcasters of CFMI-FM
City of licence	Identifier	Frequency	Power	Class	RECNet	CRTC Decision
Whistler	CFMI-FM-1	90.7 FM	50 watts	LP	Query	Decision CRTC 2000-207
Donald Station	VF2000	94.5 FM	21 watts	LP	Query	Decision CRTC 96-6
Granisle	VF2004	101.5 FM	50 watts	LP	Query	Decision CRTC 96-37
Boston Bar	VF2006	92.9 FM	50 watts	LP	Query	Decision CRTC 86-270
Tumbler Ridge	VF2051	101.1 FM	8 watts	LP	Query	Decision CRTC 92-736
Fort St. James	VF2100	99.9 FM	10 watts	VLP	Query	Decision CRTC 90-373
Chetwynd	VF2104	100.5 FM	27 watts	LP	Query	Decision CRTC 94-123
Valemount	VF2122	91.1 FM	16 watts	LP	Query	Decision CRTC 90-1042
McBride	VF2151	101.1 FM	37 watts	LP	Query	Decision CRTC 91-871
Riley Creek	VF2194	104.5 FM	22 watts	LP	Query	Décision CRTC 99-44
Kemano	VF2209	103.5 FM	10 watts	VLP	Query	Decision CRTC 93-66
Dease Lake	VF2223	100.1 FM	1 watt	LP	Query	Decision CRTC 93-708
Hagensborg	VF2287	92.7 FM	23 watts	LP	Query	Decision CRTC 95-55
Burton	VF2296	90.5 FM	1 watt	VLP	Query	Decision CRTC 95-792
Avola	VF2316	93.5 FM	20 watts	LP	Query	Decision CRTC 98-145
Blue River	VF2318	93.9 FM	8 watts	VLP	Query	Decision CRTC 98-144
Bralorne	VF2327	101.1 FM	1 watt	VLP	Query	Decision CRTC 96-640
Campbell River	VF2378	102.3 FM	11 watts	LP	Query	
Fraser Lake	VF2473	92.1 FM	36 watts	LP	Query	

=== Newfoundland and Labrador ===
Rebroadcasters of CFMI-FM
City of licence	Identifier	Frequency	Power	Class	RECNet	CRTC Decision
Burgeo	VF2076	92.3 FM	50 watts	LP	Query	CRTC 89-423

=== Saskatchewan ===
Rebroadcasters of CFMI-FM
City of licence	Identifier	Frequency	Power	Class	RECNet	CRTC Decision
Carrot River	VF2212	101.1 FM	15 watts	LP	Query	CRTC 2001-7
La Ronge	VF2376	101.1 FM	12 watts	LP	Query	
