= CKQQ-FM =

Radio station in Kelowna

Coordinates: 49°46′06″N 119°30′03″W

- Kelowna, British Columbia; Canada
- Broadcast area: Okanagan Valley
- Frequency: 103.1 MHz
- Branding: 103.1 Beach Radio

Programming
- Language: English
- Format: Classic hits

Ownership
- Owner: Jim Pattison Group
- Sister stations: CKLZ-FM; CKOV-FM

History
- First air date: 1928
- Former call signs: CKOV (1928–2007); CKOV-FM (2007–2010)

Technical information
- Licensing authority: CRTC
- Class: B
- ERP: 7,600 watts average; 35,000 watts peak; horizontal polarization only
- HAAT: 116.1 metres (381 ft)

Links
- Webcast: Listen live
- Website: www.beachradiokelowna.ca

CKQQ-FM (103.1 MHz) is a radio station in Kelowna, British Columbia, Canada. Owned by Jim Pattison Group, the station broadcasts a classic hits format.

== History ==
The station's origins are actually that of an amateur radio station with the call letters 10AY owned by the Kelowna Amateur Radio Club, whose founding members in 1928 were George Dunn, Bobby Johnston, Harry Blakeborough and James William Bromley Browne. The club was formed with the sole purpose of obtaining a non-commercial radio license from the federal radio and telecommunications regulator of the day. 10AY broadcast church services, theatre shows and concert performances by the Ogopogo Concert Club. Its initial operating power was 50 watts.

Two 90-foot poles were erected for antennas for the new CKOV (the call letters naturally stood for Canada Kelowna Okanagan Valley), and studios and offices were built on Mill Avenue. Browne used his own money to get the station going and then "sold shares" for $2.00 each. Okanagan Broadcasters was incorporated on July 27, 1931. On November 4, 1931, as a condition of Jim Browne being awarded a commercial radio license the non-commercial license had to be terminated and 10AY went off the air on this date. Following this, Browne flipped a switch and CKOV was born. He announced the station as, "This is CKOV, The Voice of the Okanagan". Its 60-watt transmitter was converted to 100 watts and CKOV operated on a frequency of 1230 kHz.

The station continued as a community effort. Listeners sent in donations to keep the station going. Among them was hardware merchant W.A.C. Bennett, later to become Premier of British Columbia. At one of the licence renewal hearings years later, Browne was told by the regulator to "clean up" the ownership. It took him several years, and even then, they could not find some of the people who had "donated" to the resources of CKOV.

In 1933, CKOV moved to 1210 kHz and decreased power to 50 watts. Following this move a year later, in 1934, the frequency changed to 630 kHz and power returned to 100 watts. It was an affiliate of the Canadian Radio Broadcasting Commission from 1933 to 1936 and was then an affiliate of the new Canadian Broadcasting Corporation. In 1938, they purchased property on Lakeshore Road and built a new transmitter on the new site, with an increased power of 1000 watts. Okanagan Broadcasters obtained licenses for CKCQ Quesnel in 1957, CKWL Williams Lake in 1960 and CKBX 100 Mile House in 1971, which made history as Canada's first licensed private radio network.

In December 1946, Okanagan Broadcasters launched a rebroadcast transmitter in Penticton. It would eventually be known as CKOK, and later CKOR. CKOV moved to new studios and offices on Pandosy Street. By this time, CKOV was a CBC Trans-Canada Network affiliate. It would remain an affiliate of TCN and its successor CBC Radio until 1977.

The original CKOV building on Mill Avenue, which later became magistrate's offices, was purchased from the city in 1951 by the Kelowna Yacht Club, who continue to operate it as the clubhouse and administrative offices for the local yacht club to this day, although it has since been sold back to the city and leased on a nominal $1.00 per year rate.

On June 3, 1954, Jim Browne died. His son Jim Browne Jr., a station engineer since 1931, assumed ownership of the station and had taken over management duties awhile back as his father's health had been failing for some time.

In 1957, the three radio stations in the Okanagan Valley, CKOV Kelowna, CKOK Penticton and CJIB Vernon, opened CHBC-TV, which began broadcasting on September 21, covering the central Okanagan valley from its main studio in Kelowna, followed three weeks later by rebroadcast transmitters in Vernon and Penticton. Each of the radio stations had one-third ownership of CHBC-TV. Walter Gray started with CKOV and later became morning host. He went on to serve as Kelowna city councillor from 1986 to 1990 and mayor from 1996 to 2005. He would also co-found CKIQ in 1970 with fellow broadcaster Bob Hall.

After receiving federal broadcast regulator approval in 1964, Okanagan Broadcasters launched CJOV-FM. Several years later, CKOV received approval to increase nighttime power to 5,000 watts with daytime power remaining at 1,000 watts. Jim Browne Jr.'s son Jamie began as a full-time employee in 1968. Jamie would later own Okanagan Broadcasters before selling out to Seacoast Communications Group Inc.

In June 1978, sister station CJOV-FM changed call letters to CHIM-FM. During the late 1970s, CKOV sold its one-third share in CHBC-TV equally to British Columbia Television and Selkirk Communications of Toronto.

In 1981, construction began on a new studio and administrative office building at the transmitter site on Lakeshore Road, largely financed by the sale of its share of CHBC. As part of the same project, CKOV got a new solid-state AM transmitter and became an early adopter of AM stereo.

Big ownership changes came in 1988 when the Browne family sold their 57-year-old CKOV and 24-year-old CHIM-FM stations to Seacoast Communications Group, which owned various radio stations on Vancouver Island including CFAX in Victoria, for an undisclosed price. The CRTC approved the transaction on August 31 of that year. There was a further windfall for both the Browne family and CKOV/Seacoast, as Jamie Browne developed and sold the land around the transmitter site as a new housing subdivision. The Browne family held part of the land, with the rest owned by Seacoast. This resulted in the relocation of CKOV's transmitter to lease land from CKIQ Kelowna at its site a couple of kilometers away.

The following year, in 1989, CKOV's sister station CHIM-FM changed call letters to CKLZ-FM and rebranded itself as 104.7 The Lizard. Ten years later, in June 1998, the CRTC approved the purchase of CKOV and CKLZ by Jim Pattison Group from Seacoast.

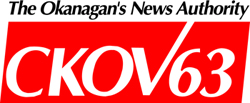
Former logo as CKOV 63 'AM' logo (circa: late 1990s - 2007)

Finally, on April 23, 2007, the CRTC approved application by the Jim Pattison Group to move CKOV to the FM band at 103.1, with an effective radiated power of 11,000 watts average (35,000 watts maximum). The new station said it would offer a soft vocals music format and continue with its traditional style of news and information programming, including Open Line with John Michaels, a daily current affairs show. The new FM station's music format and spoken word programming were to target Kelowna listeners in the 35-to-64-year-old age group.

Although the application stated it would continue with a soft vocals and news and information format, the FM transmitter officially signed on at noon on August 17 of the same year with a country format. The first song on B-103 was Tim McGraw's "I Like It, I Love It".

The program director Bob Mills says one of the reasons for the change was that, "CKOV has lost money for years and I'm talking about hundreds of thousands of dollars annually, so a change had to happen." As a tribute to the Browne family, which launched CKOV, the new station continued with the official CKOV call letters, but identified on air as "B-103". The AM signal was shut down on November 17, 2007 at 1 p.m. On December 16, 2008, Heather Adams announced her new co-host for the Morning Buzz program would be Troy Scott, who had recently resigned from his morning show on CHNK-FM in Winnipeg, Manitoba. On January 5, 2009 at 5:30 a.m. the Morning Buzz with Heather & Troy signed on for the first time. August 29, 2009 Heather and Troy began a Top 20 countdown show that runs twice on the weekend.

For the second anniversary of B-103, the station unveiled a new updated logo of the bee wearing a white cowboy hat on its website. B-103 rebranded and switched formats from a country format to a hot adult contemporary one on February 3, 2010. Its programming officially launched at 5:30 AM, February 8, 2010. Current on-air talent includes Heather Adams and Steve Thompson in the mornings, Drew Ferreira hosts mid-days and Assistant Program Director Troy Scott moved from mornings to afternoon drive. Jim Avery, previously with CILK-FM, is still hosting on the weekends. Previous long-time hosts Dave Pears and Grant Scott are no longer with the station, with Pears retiring from a long career in Canadian radio broadcasting and Grant Scott's future uncertain. Also the same day, the station changed its call letters from the historic CKOV-FM to CKQQ-FM.

On October 20, 2017, CKQQ-FM flipped to classic hits, branded as 103.1 Beach Radio.

The CKOV-FM call letters later appeared on a country station in Strathmore, Alberta. In 2021, the calls were brought back to Kelowna by Radius Holdings' CKOO-FM; CKOV-FM would subsequently be acquired by Jim Pattison Group in 2024, making that station a sister to the original CKOV.
