= Global News: BC 1 =

Cable local news channel in British Columbia, Canada

- Country: Canada
- Broadcast area: British Columbia; National (via satellite)
- Headquarters: Burnaby, British Columbia

Programming
- Language: English
- Picture format: 1080i HDTV (downscaled to letterboxed 480i for the SDTV feed)

Ownership
- Owner: Corus Entertainment
- Parent: Corus Television Limited Partnership
- Sister channels: TV: CHAN-DT, CHBC-DT; Radio: CKNW, CFMI-FM, CFOX-FM

History
- Launched: March 14, 2013; 13 years ago

Links
- Website: Global News: BC 1

Global News: BC 1 (often referred to as BC 1) is a Canadian English language specialty channel owned by Corus Entertainment and operated alongside the Corus-owned Global Television Network's Vancouver owned-and-operated television station CHAN-DT (Global BC). The channel primarily broadcasts local news for the province of British Columbia. The channel's branding is derived from the Global network and its news division Global News. It broadcasts from CHAN-DT's studios on 7850 Enterprise Street (across from the Lake City Way SkyTrain station) in Burnaby.

== History ==
On January 11, 2012, Shaw Media announced its intention to launch a 24-hour local news channel for the province of British Columbia (the first regional news channel in Canada located outside of Ontario), that would be operated alongside Global's Vancouver station CHAN-DT, with an expected launch date of summer 2012.

The channel was approved by the Canadian Radio-television and Telecommunications Commission (CRTC) on July 20, 2012 under the tentative name "BC Global News". It was described as "a regional, English-language specialty Category B service that will offer a mix of local and regional news, traffic, weather, business, sports and entertainment information devoted to serving residents of British Columbia, with a special focus on the Vancouver/Victoria Extended Market, as defined by the Broadcast Bureau of Measurement (BBM) Canada." On the same day, Shaw Media announced its revised plan to launch the channel in early 2013 under the new name "Global News: BC 1".

Logo from 2013-2022

On August 30, 2012, Global BC posted a statement about Global News: BC 1, which had expected to be launched in January 2013, claiming it "will provide viewers across the province with top local and regional stories" and will become an "important component of Global News' Digital First objective." The launch would later be delayed to March 14, 2013. The channel soft launched on March 14 at 8:00 a.m. PDT (14:00 UTC) and officially launched one hour later at 9:00 a.m. PT with the debut of the show AM/BC.

On April 1, 2016, Global News: BC 1's parent company Shaw Media (which also included parent network Global and 18 other specialty channels) was sold to Shaw's sister company Corus Entertainment, and the station earned four already owned radio stations for sister networks.

In October 2022, the channel was given a new logo and on-air graphics to coincide with Corus Entertainment's rebrand of all existing Global News properties.

== Format ==
Global News: BC1's screen graphics as seen in 2013.

Global News: BC1 contains an 'L-frame' display at the bottom and right side of the channel's screen, which carries the day's top news headlines, weather, sports scores, and market indices, with regular banner ads interspersed. The channel simulcasts all local news programming seen on Global BC - eight hours a day during the week and six hours daily on weekends. The channel also airs one newscast from Global Okanagan, another Global owned-and-operated station serving the Okanagan region of British Columbia. The Global Okanagan late news airs at 9:25 PM PT on weekdays and 9:30 PM PT on weekends, under the name "Global News on BC1", with an anchor presenting the newscast from the Global Okanagan studios in Kelowna. This newscast is also broadcast later in the evening at 11:00 PM PT on Global Okanagan.

In January 2015, BC1 changed its on-screen graphics to white and light blue. On the right of the screen they put a live traffic feed of the traffic cameras.
