= CKOV-FM =

Radio station in Kelowna

Coordinates: 49°58′00″N 119°31′40″W

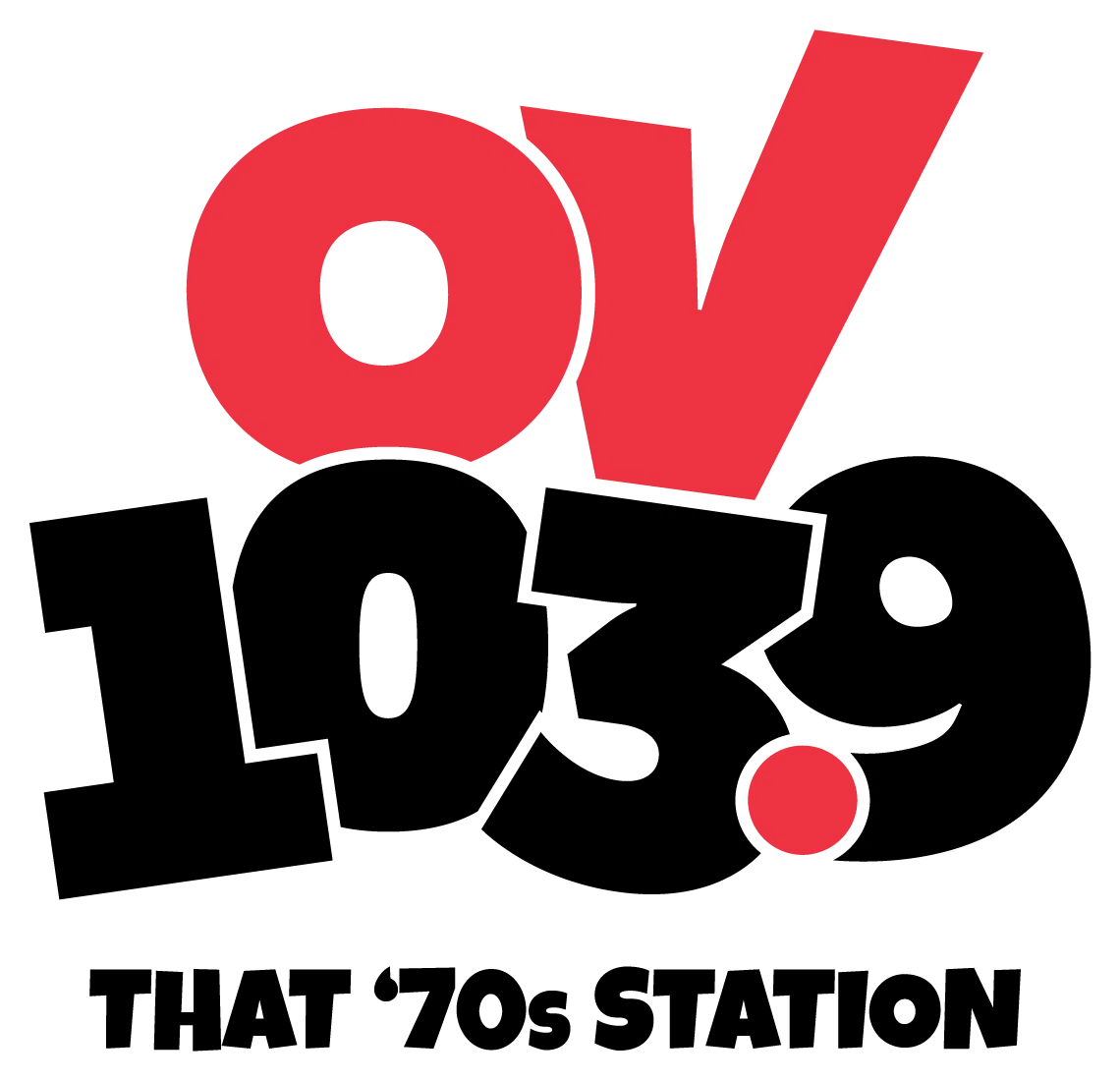
- Kelowna, British Columbia; Canada
- Broadcast area: Okanagan Valley
- Frequency: 103.9 MHz
- Branding: OV 103.9

Programming
- Format: Oldies

Ownership
- Owner: Jim Pattison Group
- Sister stations: CKLZ-FM; CKQQ-FM

History
- First air date: September 29, 2008
- Former call signs: CJUI-FM (2008–2018); CKOO-FM (2018–2020)
- Call sign meaning: Kelowna, Okanagan Valley

Technical information
- Licensing authority: CRTC
- Class: C
- ERP: 17,300 watts
- HAAT: −90 metres (−300 ft)

Links
- Webcast: Listen Live
- Website: ov1039.ca

CKOV-FM (103.9 FM, OV 103.9) is a radio station in Kelowna, British Columbia, Canada. Owned by Jim Pattison Group, it broadcasts an oldies format that primarily focuses on music from the 1970s.

== History ==
On March 14, 2008, the CRTC approved in part an application by Vista Broadcast Group for a new FM station to serve Kelowna with an adult hits format. However, the applied for frequency of 96.1 MHz, with an average effective radiated power of 19,900 watts was rejected by the commission as unacceptable, due to approval of another FM station application by Sun Country Cablevision to use 96.3 MHz. Vista subsequently re-filed its application for a new frequency and on August 7 of the same year, the Commission approved the use of 103.9 MHz with an average ERP of 5,200 watts. The station officially launched on September 9, 2008, as CJUI-FM 103.9 The Juice.

On January 31, 2013, the CRTC approved Vista's application to increase CJUI's effective radiated power (ERP) from 5,200 to 17,300 watts (maximum ERP from 10,000 to 36,800 watts), by decreasing the effective height of antenna above average terrain from 506 to -90 metres, by relocating the transmitter site and by changing the class from C1 to C.

On February 14, 2014, CJUI-FM renamed itself from 103.9 the Juice to 103.9 Juice FM while the slogan switched from "Kelowna's greatest hits" to "Kelowna's Biggest Variety".

=== Avenue Radio ownership ===
In October 2017, the CRTC approved a deal for Vista to sell CJUI to Avenue Radio Ltd., a company owned by Nicholas J. Frost— founder of the local news website Castanet and former owner of CILK-FM. Avenue planned to move the station to a new facility shared with the website on Lawrence Avenue in Kelowna, and planned to increase the station's coverage of local news in the Okanagan region.

On November 1, 2017, CJUI flipped to an oldies format branded as Okanagan Oldies 103.9. In January 2018, its call letters were changed to CKOO-FM to reflect the new branding. On January 2, 2019, CKOO flipped to soft adult contemporary as Soft 103.9.

In April 2019, Castanet announced its sale to Glacier Media. The sale was initially stated to have included CKOO-FM, but Frost and Avenue Radio ultimately retained the station via his company Early Frost Investments.

=== Bankruptcy, Radius Holdings ownership ===
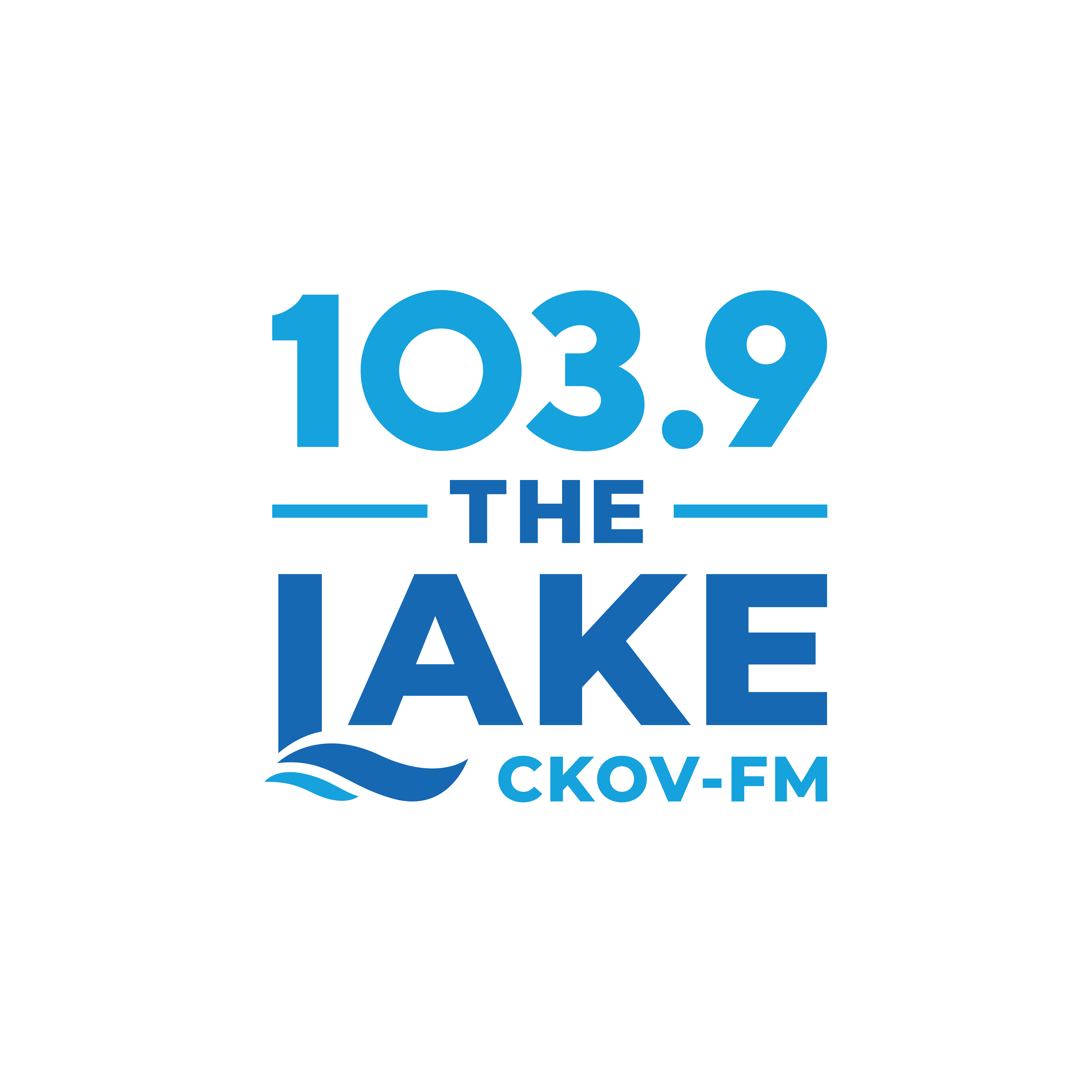
Former logo as 103.9 The Lake

On March 31, 2020, Avenue Radio Ltd. filed for bankruptcy, and CKOO-FM went dark shortly afterwards. Following the shutdown, trustee Grant Thornton sought a new owner for the station's assets. In June 2020, it approved a bid by veteran broadcaster Paul Larsen (one of the former owners of Clear Sky Radio) to acquire the station.

Jim Pattison Broadcast Group and Stingray Radio filed interventions against the proposed sale, alleging that the station's license was abandoned by Avenue Radio, and that the frequency would therefore have to go through the CRTC's competitive licensing process as a "new" station. The CRTC dismissed the intervention, ruling that the trustee had made a good faith effort to seek a new owner, and that it did not formally request the revocation of the license. The CRTC approved the sale of CKOO-FM to Larsen (via licensee Radius Holdings) in November 2020.

On March 26, 2021, the station returned to air and relaunched as adult hits 103.9 The Lake, adopting the heritage callsign CKOV-FM (previously used locally by what is now CKQQ-FM). The station promoted itself as a soft rock station featuring music from the 1970s through the 2000s.

=== Pattison Media ownership ===
In August 2023, the Jim Pattison Group announced its intent to acquire the station.

The sale was completed on April 1, 2024. The next day, CKOV-FM flipped back to oldies as OV 103.9; positioned as "That 70's Station", the format focuses primarily on music from the 1970s, and to a lesser extent, the 1960s. The sale also made CKOV-FM a sister station to CKQQ.
