= CHBC-DT =

Television station in Kelowna

- Kelowna, British Columbia; Canada
- Channels: Digital: 27 (UHF); Virtual: 2
- Branding: Global Okanagan

Programming
- Affiliations: 2.1: Global

Ownership
- Owner: Corus Entertainment; (Corus Television Limited Partnership)
- Sister stations: CHAN-DT, Global News: BC 1

History
- First air date: September 21, 1957
- Former call signs: CHBC-TV (1957–2012)
- Former channel numbers: Analog: 2 (VHF, 1957–2012)
- Former affiliations: CBC (1957–2006); CH/E! (2006–2009)
- Call sign meaning: Highlands of British Columbia (callsign predates creation of the CH system)

Technical information
- Licensing authority: CRTC
- ERP: 32.6 kW
- HAAT: 509.6 m (1,672 ft)
- Transmitter coordinates: 49°58′2″N 119°31′50″W
- Translator(s): see § Transmitters

Links
- Website: Global Okanagan

CHBC-DT (channel 2) is a television station in Kelowna, British Columbia, Canada, owned and operated by the Global Television Network, a division of Corus Entertainment. Its main transmitter is located on Blue Grouse Mountain in the Regional District of Central Okanagan.

Since the dismantling of the former E! television system and its switch to Global, CHBC has effectively operated as a semi-satellite of sister station CHAN-DT in Vancouver, airing the majority of its programming in pattern, but with evening newscasts covering the Okanagan region produced from studios on Leon Avenue (near Water Street) in Downtown Kelowna. Due to cost-cutting measures by Corus, CHBC's local newscasts began to be produced from CHAN-DT's studios in August 2024, presented by a single anchor with contributions from local reporters.

== History ==
=== As a CBC affiliate ===
The station first signed on the air on September 21, 1957, originally operating as a CBC affiliate. Its signal covered the central Okanagan, broadcasting at 3,700 watts of power from its main studios and transmitter in Kelowna. The station was founded by three local radio stations: CKOV-AM (now CKQQ-FM) in Kelowna, CKOK (now CKOR) in Penticton and CJIB (now CKIZ-FM) in Vernon. Due to the mountainous terrain of the area, which impaired the primary signal in certain areas, the station began operating repeaters a few weeks later in Vernon (broadcasting on VHF channel 7, at 310 watts) and Penticton (broadcasting on VHF channel 13, at 300 watts). At the time of the station's sign-on, only 500 homes in the area had television receivers, but that amount rose to 10,000 the following year. The station had ordered two studio cameras, but due to the number of television stations that started up in North America during that period, the station had to make do with one camera on loan for a year until the order was filled. They also relied on 16 mm film, which was developed first by a local photo lab, and then again in-house.

All network programs were originally received on kinescope and 16 mm film, with regular programs airing on a week delay after their airing on CBC stations in other markets, with the National News airing on a day-behind basis. In 1960, the station began receiving programs from the CBC via its microwave link. Local programs and advertisements were produced live to air. Locally produced programs during the station's early days included Kids Bids, The Three R's, Romper Room, Let's Visit, Midday, Focus and Okanagan Magazine. In 1964, CHBC received its first videotape machine, which aided the production of local programming and commercials. Two years later, the station began airing programming in colour via the network, and the station gradually installed more equipment for colour production and transmission, as well as telecine and videotape.

In the late 1960s, CHBC and fellow CBC affiliate CFJC-TV in Kamloops formed BCI-TV (standing for British Columbia Interior Television), an internal company headed by CHBC for programming and sales of the combined Okanagan/Kamloops markets. The national sales were delegated to All Canada Sales, which provided advertising sales for both stations as a single unit under the name "BCI TV". For years, both stations carried virtually identical programming schedules, apart from local newscasts. In 1970, CHAN-TV in Vancouver reached an agreement with CHBC to provide CTV programming to the area, via a protective service, which protected local advertisers from Vancouver advertisers with cut-ins on the second station. The full conversion to colour broadcasts was completed in 1971, when CHBC purchased a colour studio camera.

CHBC logo from the 1990s to 2007.

During the 1970s and 1980s, the ownership of the station changed, beginning with the purchase of CKOK's one-third ownership by general manager Roy Chapman, which he later sold to CHAN. Selkirk Communications brought CJIB, and along with it, its 33% stake. CKOV sold its stake in equal parts to both CHAN and Selkirk, which resulted in both companies each owning 50% of the station. In 1987, CHBC president and general manager Ron Evans spearheaded a campaign as part of its adopted branding as "The Okanagan's Very Own CHBC", in order to compete with the 40 television station signals that were being distributed by cable operators within the market. As a result, the station increased its local programming and advertisements, and CHBC increased its involvement in the 55 communities that it served. This commitment has been recognized and rewarded through the improvement of its ratings and nods from many industry awards; CHBC was often held-up as a Canadian model for its ability to identify with the community it served during this era.

When Maclean-Hunter took over Selkirk in 1989, CHAN's parent company Western International Communications (WIC) purchased Selkirk's stake to take full control of CHBC. In 1998, the Griffiths family's stake in WIC was sold to a joint venture between Shaw Communications and Canwest. After months of negotiations, the Canadian Radio-television and Telecommunications Commission (CRTC) approved the split of WIC's assets between Canwest, Corus Radio and Shaw Communications. CHBC and sister station CHAN-TV were sold to Canwest in 2000. When Canwest acquired CHBC, it assumed the same role in selling advertising and providing programming, primarily from its CH television system.

=== As a CH/E! O&O ===
In late 2003, the CBC notified CHBC that it did not intend to renew its affiliation agreement with the station after it expired in August 2005. In response, the station filed an application with the CRTC in 2004 to disaffiliate from the CBC; the CRTC gave approval to the disaffiliation on February 28, 2005. CBC Television's Vancouver O&O CBUT subsequently added a new rebroadcast transmitter in Kelowna, broadcasting on UHF channel 45. After its BCI-TV partner CFJC-TV received similar approval to disaffiliate from the CBC, both stations switched affiliations on February 27, 2006, and continued the operation of BCI-TV with new programs supplied from Canwest's secondary CH television system.

Logo used during CHBC's newscasts from 2007 to 2010; it continued to be used on the station's website until 2013, and also served as the station's universal branding from 2007 to 2009.

CHBC was the only Canwest-owned CH station to not use the CH brand on-air, opting to brand by its call letters instead, with its newscasts being titled CHBC News. The local newscast branding remained in use following CH's rebranding as E! in 2007. All programming on CHBC outside locally produced shows were branded under the "E!" name.

In November 2008, CHBC announced that it would move the production facilities for its newscasts from its studios in Kelowna to sister station CHEK in Victoria, to be produced from a virtual set, with production being taken over by Vancouver sister CHAN-TV. In addition, the noon newscast was cancelled.

=== As a Global O&O ===
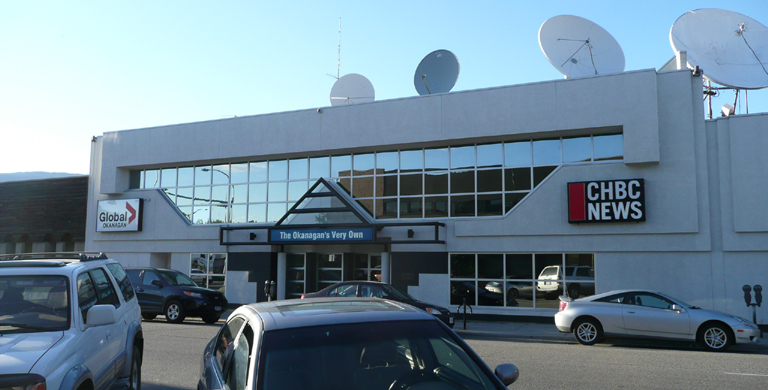
CHBC's former studio facility in Downtown Kelowna

On February 5, 2009, Canwest announced it would explore "strategic options", including a possible sale, for CHBC and its other E! owned-and-operated stations, stating that "a second conventional TV network [was] no longer key to the long-term success" of the company. Although for a time it was reported that CHBC might cease operations, Canwest ultimately decided to convert it into a Global owned-and-operated station on August 31, 2009. The Global Television Network's programming was already available in the Okanagan region through CHAN-TV out of Vancouver, which has operated a semi-satellite in the region, CHKL-TV, since the early 1980s. Station management later reversed its decision to move the studio segments to Victoria due to viewer complaints. The half-hour 11 p.m. newscast would later be expanded to one hour to make up for the loss of the half-hour noon newscast, while the 5 p.m. news began with a half-hour lifestyle-oriented newscast that was anchored by Doris Janssen.

CHBC and CHAN were expected to continue to operate separately for the foreseeable future, due in large part to the two stations' highly rated local and provincial newscasts. However, the two stations' schedules and advertising are virtually identical, including local news programming outside the supper hour. More specifically, CHBC simulcasts CHAN's programming at all times, with the exception of daily Kelowna-based newscasts seen exclusively on CHBC and its scheduling of the network's national evening newscast Global National, which CHBC airs at 6 p.m. (whereas CHAN airs it at 5:30 p.m.). Initially, there were also very minor differences within the two stations' prime time schedules, however both CHAN and CHBC began airing a common prime time schedule by the fall of 2011 if not sooner.

On July 7, 2010, CHBC introduced a new virtual set that is controlled out of the master control facilities at CHAN's studios in Vancouver. The station dropped the E!-era graphics it used for its newscasts and implemented a package used by Global's O&Os, but the station's newscasts continued to be branded as CHBC News until April 2013, when its newscasts were retitled as Global Okanagan News.

After Canwest filed for creditor protection in October 2009, Shaw Communications purchased the broadcasting assets of Canwest; the acquisition was completed on October 27, 2010.

== News operation ==
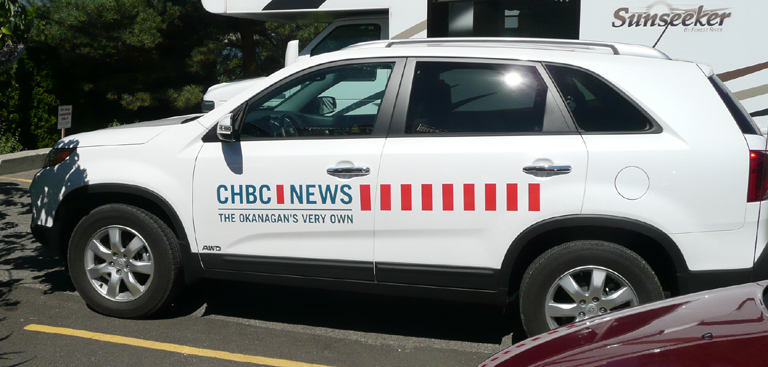
A CHBC News vehicle

Until 2024, CHBC-DT broadcast 15 1/2 hours of locally produced newscasts each week (with 2 1/2 hours each weekday and 1 1/2 hours each on Saturdays and Sundays). CHBC produced an hour-long early evening newscast at 5 p.m. on weeknights, a half-hour newscast at 5:30 on Saturday and Sunday evenings, and a half-hour newscast at 6:30 and an 11 p.m. newscast seven nights a week (the latter airs for an hour on weeknights and a half-hour on weekends). CHBC had previously aired 22 1/2 hours per week of local programming until September 2009. The minimum amount of local programming currently required by the station's licence as of 2009 is seven hours per week.

Due to corporate cutbacks instituted by Canwest in September 2009, CHBC stopped utilizing live newsgathering services in Vernon, Kelowna and Penticton; in addition, the station's 5 p.m. newscast and a weekly half-hour newsmagazine, Okanagan Now, which was dedicated to events happening around the Okanagan region, were cancelled. CHBC began broadcasting its local newscasts in high definition (over its HD feed on Shaw Cable 211) on July 6, 2011. Five days later on July 11, 2011, the station began using its live newsgathering resources once again and restored an hour-long 5 p.m. newscast to its schedule. Since April 2016, the hour-long news program's name was changed to Global News at 5. CHBC also has a program called Global News at 6:30 which airs after Global National. Global News at 5 was anchored by Rick Webber with Wesla Wong and Duane English alternating days on weather. Global News at 6:30 was anchored by Rick Webber and Doris Maria Bregolisse. Weather anchor Wesla Wong resigned in February 2018 and Duane English also resigned, effective April 2, 2018.

After 30 years on the air as the main news anchor, Rick Webber retired on July 31, 2019.

Due to corporate cutbacks instituted by Corus Entertainment in August 2024, local production of CHBC newscasts ended on August 16, 2024. Since August 19, 2024, CHBC's newscasts have been produced out of the facilities of CHAN with contributions from local reporters, and were cut to half-hour bulletins aired at 5:30, 6:30, and 11 p.m. All CHBC newscasts are now solely anchored by Coleen Christie, a reporter of Global News: BC 1. Coming alongside similar cuts to news programming at several Ontario stations, Corus stated that it had "reimagined our broadcast schedule in Kingston, Peterborough, and Kelowna with a focus on supper hour and late-night news programming". The changes were met with criticism from station employees and local residents. Kelowna city councillor and former CHBC reporter Mohini Singh questioned Corus' continued commitment to the market, whether the newscasts would remain locally relevant, and whether the cuts were in compliance with the station's CRTC license.

== Technical information ==
=== Subchannel ===
Subchannel of CHBC-DT
Subchannel	Res.	Short name	Programming
2.1	1080i	CHBC	Global

=== Analog-to-digital conversion ===
On October 15, 2012, CHBC flash cut the digital signals of its main Kelowna transmitter and its rebroadcasters in Penticton and Vernon into operation on UHF channels 27, 32 and 20. Digital television receivers display CHBC's virtual channel on its main transmitter as channel 2.2 (indirectly corresponding to its analog-era VHF channel 2).

All of the station's transmitters were required to convert to digital broadcasts before August 31, 2016, as part of a promise that Shaw Media made to the CRTC during its acquisition of Canwest.

=== Transmitters ===
Station	City of license	Channel	ERP	HAAT	Transmitter coordinates	CRTC Application
CHBC-DT-1	Penticton	32 (UHF)	3 kW	365.3 m	49°39′34″N 119°34′22″W	
CHBC-DT-2	Vernon	20 (UHF)	3 kW	184.6 m	50°16′58″N 119°19′13″W	
