= Deborra Hope =

Canadian journalist (1955–2023)

Deborra Hope CM
- Born: Deborra Jane Brown; April 18, 1955; Trail, British Columbia, Canada
- Died: May 15, 2023 (aged 68); Vancouver, British Columbia, Canada
- Education: University of British Columbia; Carleton University
- Occupation: Journalist
- Employer: CHAN-DT (1981–2014)
- Spouse: Roger Hope
- Children: 2

Deborra Jane Hope CM (née Brown; April 18, 1955 – May 15, 2023) was a Canadian journalist, anchor, and producer for Global owned-and-operated station CHAN-DT in Vancouver, British Columbia. She joined the station in 1981, when it was known as BCTV, then a CTV affiliate. Hope hosted the Early News at 5 p.m. and the 'InSight' segment of the News Hour at 6 until she retired in 2014.

== Background and career ==
Hope was born in Trail, British Columbia, a small town in the west Kootenays. She attended the University of British Columbia, where she started in journalism by reading news on the campus radio station, CiTR and reporting for the student newspaper, The Ubyssey. She graduated from UBC with a Bachelor of Arts degree. Hope then attended Carleton University in Ottawa where she received a Bachelor of Journalism (Honours). After graduating, Hope started working for The Canadian Press as a junior reporter. She then returned to British Columbia where she joined the now-defunct United Press Canada, working there for three years before joining BCTV. She was married to Roger Hope, a Global BC news cameraman; they had two daughters.

As part of the 2022 Canadian honours, Hope was appointed a Member of the Order of Canada (CM) "for her contributions to Canadian journalism as a reporter and anchor, and for her tireless involvement as a volunteer."

== Health and death ==
When Hope retired in 2014, she had started to show symptoms of what would be revealed to be Alzheimer's disease. Her coworkers said they had noticed she was beginning to make mistakes with names and words occasionally while reading the news, and seemed to be gradually getting forgetful and confused. After living at home with her family for a number of years, she eventually entered a long-term care facility. She died on May 15, 2023, at the age of 68.
