= CKFR =

Radio station in Kelowna

Coordinates: 49.8861°N 119.4946°W

- Kelowna, British Columbia; Canada
- Broadcast area: Okanagan Valley
- Frequency: 1150 kHz
- Branding: AM 1150 News, Talk, Sports

Programming
- Format: News/Talk/Sports
- Affiliations: West Kelowna Warriors

Ownership
- Owner: Vista Radio
- Sister stations: CHSU-FM, CILK-FM

History
- First air date: November 8, 1971
- Former call signs: CKIQ (1971–2004)

Technical information
- Class: B
- Power: 10,000 watts

Links
- Webcast: Listen Live
- Website: https://www.am1150.ca/

CKFR is a radio station in Kelowna, British Columbia, Canada. Broadcasting at 1150 AM, the station airs news/talk and sports formats, and identifies on air as AM 1150 News, Talk, Sports. It is owned by Vista Radio.

Other than in mandated hourly pre-recorded station identifications and the title of the morning show, the callsign CKFR is not mentioned on air or in station branding and promos. The callsign was randomly assigned to replace the former CKBL callsign when the station switched from 1150 AM The Bullet's country format to Oldies 1150's oldies format in 2004.

== History ==
The station originated as CKIQ, first signing on the air on November 8, 1971. It was owned and operated by veteran broadcasters Walter Gray, who would later serve as three-term mayor of Kelowna, and Bob Hall through their company Four Seasons Radio. Four Seasons also owned several stations in Golden, Revelstoke and Salmon Arm. The licence, for an AM station operating on 1150 kHz with a day and night power of 1,000 watts, was awarded July 22 of the same year and beat out a competing application from J.B. Cooper.

In the summer of 1972, the offices of CKIQ were destroyed by fire. By the next day, the station was back on the air, reportedly operating out of several motel rooms in the area. Warehouse space in the area was found for CKIQ to operate out of for six months while the fire-ravaged building was rebuilt on the original property. The following year, in December 1973, CKIQ's daytime power was increased to 10,000 watts while nighttime power remained at 1,000 power. Nighttime power is often lower because of changes in the planet's ionosphere that allow a station to be broadcast farther and more clearly at low power. However, in 1981, CKIQ's nighttime power increased from 1,000 to 10,000 watts as well.

In 1982, CKIQ's coverage area expanded with the granting by the Canadian Radio-television Telecommunications Commission for an FM rebroadcaster at Big White Ski Village on Big White mountain. It was known unofficially as CKIQ-FM, though that was never advertised on air, when the rebroadcaster launched in 1983.

In 1995, Four Seasons Radio launched CKBL-FM after receiving approval for an FM licence in the Kelowna radio market. That station was branded as 99.9 The Bullet and broadcast a country format.

A company called Okanagan Skeena Radio Group acquired the remaining 73.2% of a personal holding company, West Global Broadcast Holding that it didn't already own from Walter Gray, Bob Hall, and other shareholders. West Global, in turned, owned the operating company for CKIQ and CKBL, Four Seasons Radio. Following this transaction, Okanagan Skeena Radio Group became the new sole owner of these radio stations, as well as stations in Golden, Revelstoke, Salmon Arm and its southern interior stations.

1997 saw major changes to the two sister stations in the Kelowna radio market. CKBL-FM became CHSU-FM, changing its branding to 99.9 Sun FM and its music format to hot adult contemporary. Simultaneously, CKIQ-AM's call letters became CKBL-AM and its format switched from its twenty-six-year-old news/talk format to a country format and the station was now branded as 1150 AM The Bullet. This all required, and received, approval of the Canadian Radio-television Telecommunications Commission (CRTC) and Industry Canada for the flipping of CKBL from the FM to the AM band and the various callsign changes.

Several things happened in 1999. CKBL-AM's CKBL-FM-1 rebroadcaster at Big White Ski Village (98.1 MHz with ERP of 18 watts) ceased to be a rebroadcaster for CKBL-AM. It was now a rebroadcaster for CHSU-FM. Telemedia purchased Okanagan Skeena Group. Finally, on October 28 of the same year, Okanagan Skeena Radio Group's application to convert CKBL to the FM band was denied by the CRTC. The application was submitted by Okanagan Skeena before Telemedia's buyout Okanagan Skeena Radio Group was finalized.

In 2002, Standard Radio acquired Telemedia's radio and northern BC TV station assets. Telemedia's printed periodical business were largely acquired by Transcontinental Media at the same time. By buying Telemedia's radio and TV stations, Standard became the largest privately owned radio station owner and operator in Canada.

On August 1, 2003, CKBL switched from country music to an oldies format and its branding was also changed to Oldies 1150. In May 2004, its call letters were changed as well to its current callsign of CKFR. KFR Kelowna was added to the Oldies 1150 logo and the station was given a slogan as well, calling itself "The Greatest Music on Earth". (As of November 1, 2007, CKBL are the call letters of an FM station in Saskatoon, Saskatchewan)

On August 29, 2007, CKFR-AM switched to its current format of news/talk and sports, branding itself as AM 1150 News, Talk, Sports when cross-town competitor CKOV switched to the FM dial and began offering a country format as B-103 on August 17. For two weeks, Kelowna was without a news/talk radio station.

In October 2007, Astral Media acquired Standard Broadcasting's terrestrial radio and television assets, including CKFR. Astral was subsequently acquired by Bell Media.

On February 8, 2024, Bell Media announced a restructuring that included the sale of 45 of its 103 radio stations to seven buyers, subject to approval by the CRTC, including CKFR, which is to be sold to Vista Radio. The application was approved on February 13, 2025. Vista took ownership of CKFR on April 14, 2025, with the company stating that there would be no major changes to CKFR's programming.
