= CKLZ-FM =

Radio station in Kelowna

Coordinates: 49°46′06″N 119°30′03″W

- Kelowna, British Columbia; Canada
- Broadcast area: Okanagan Valley
- Frequency: 104.7 MHz
- Branding: 104.7 The Lizard

Programming
- Format: Mainstream rock
- Affiliations: Kelowna Rockets

Ownership
- Owner: Jim Pattison Group
- Sister stations: CKOV-FM; CKQQ-FM

History
- First air date: 1964
- Former call signs: CJOV-FM (1964–1978); CHIM-FM (1978–1989)
- Call sign meaning: Kelowna Lizard

Technical information
- Licensing authority: CRTC
- Class: C
- ERP: 11,000 watts average; 36,000 watts peak; horizontal polarization only
- HAAT: 114.5 metres (376 ft)

Links
- Webcast: Listen live
- Website: www.1047thelizard.ca

CKLZ-FM is a radio station, broadcasting at 104.7 FM in Kelowna, British Columbia, Canada. The station, owned by the Jim Pattison Group, broadcasts a mainstream rock format branded as 104.7 The Lizard.
