= CFOX-FM =

Radio station in Vancouver, Canada

- Vancouver, British Columbia; Canada
- Broadcast area: Greater Vancouver
- Frequency: 99.3 MHz (FM)
- Branding: CFOX

Programming
- Format: Modern rock

Ownership
- Owner: Corus Entertainment; (Corus Radio Company)
- Sister stations: CKNW, CFMI-FM, CHAN-DT, Global News: BC 1

History
- First air date: October 15, 1964
- Former call signs: CKLG-FM (1964–1979)

Technical information
- Class: C
- ERP: 51,000 watts average 100,000 watts peak
- HAAT: 368.4 metres (1,209 ft)
- Transmitter coordinates: 49.345°N 122.973°W

Links
- Webcast: Listen live
- Website: cfox.com

CFOX-FM (identified on air and in print as CFOX) is a Canadian radio station in Vancouver, British Columbia. It broadcasts on an assigned frequency of 99.3 MHz on the FM band with an effective radiated power of 100,000 watts (peak). The transmitter is located on Mount Seymour in the District of North Vancouver, with studios located in Downtown Vancouver, in the TD Tower. The station is owned by Corus Entertainment. CFOX has a modern rock format, as it reports to Mediabase as a Canadian alternative rock station.

== History ==
CFOX began broadcasting on October 15, 1964, on 99.3 MHz with 100,000 watts, under the call sign CKLG-FM (not to be confused with the new "LG" in Vancouver CHLG-FM on 104.3 MHz.). Transmissions originally came from the south slope of Fromme Mountain in North Vancouver.

CKLG initially began with an easy listening format, but in the fall of 1967, it started experimenting with rock music at night. In October that year, CKLG program director Frank Callaghan hired record store owner Bill Reiter (who later went on to become part of the Dr. Bundolo's Pandemonium Medicine Show comedy troupe) to host the jazz/blues program Groovin' Blue on Saturday evenings. CKLG-FM soon shifted to become Canada's first full-time FM rock station on March 16, 1968, with the expansion of Groovin' Blue to six nights a week and the addition of tracks from rock, folk and popular albums. In 1970, CKLG-FM added a two-hour daily talk show hosted by Allen Garr, which ran on the station until 1975. By 1973, CKLG-FM had compiled a library of 3000 albums, and all its programming was aired live except on Sunday mornings, with special programming on the station including the Allen Garr talk show, live concerts and a Saturday sock-hop program. In 1976, under the guidance of new program director Roy Hennessy (a former morning host on CKLG-AM), the FM station made the gradual transition to a progressive rock format.

At noon on January 6, 1979, CKLG changed to CFOX-FM, a call sign first used by a defunct AM radio station in Montreal in the 1960s and 1970s. The switch was marked by The Beatles song "The End", followed by "The End" by The Doors, concluding with three minutes of the sound of a scratching record commonly referred to as "playing the label". The first song on the "new" CFOX was Steely Dan's "FM (No Static at All)".

In 1984, CFOX moved its transmitter to the Rogers Broadcast multiplex on nearby Mount Seymour in order to reduce multipath reception problems.

On August 20, 1992, the Canadian Radio-television and Telecommunications Commission (CRTC) approved the sale of CFOX and CKLG from Moffat Communications Ltd. to Shaw Communications. This was part of Moffat's sale of its radio division. Transfer of CKLG/CFOX to Shaw was completed on September 1, 1992. Shaw's broadcasting division became Corus Entertainment in 1999. When Western International Communications, owner of classic rocker CFMI, sold its radio stations to Corus in 2000, CFOX shifted from album oriented rock to alternative rock, aiming at Rogers' former alternative rocker 104.9 Xfm (CKVX-FM), which signed on December 31, 1999.

In 1998, the station received approval to add a transmitter at Whistler to operate on the frequency 92.3 MHz with the callsign CFOX-FM-1.

Rogers changed CKVX from alternative rock to a smooth jazz/adult contemporary hybrid as CKCL on December 26, 2003, making CFOX the lone alternative rocker in Vancouver. CFOX soon returned to an active rock format, mixing in classic hard rock and heavy metal music, but continues to lean alternative rock. Most alternative songs were toned down when CKPK-FM signed on in 2008. By 2011, the station returned to alternative. On July 14, 2011, the CRTC approved Corus's application to increase the average effective radiated power (ERP) from 35,200 to 51,000 watts (maximum ERP from 75,000 to 100,000 watts).

== FOX Seeds ==
Every year since 1979, there has been a competition through voting, live events and a concert with the finalists at the Commodore Ballroom and radio air play on CFOX of unsigned local bands that have entered to compete for that year. It is narrowed down to a few winners and one Platinum winner. Prizes include cars, support, agency, management, recording guidance and other items which can be instrumental to a band's career like the ones below.

Winners include Nickelback, Bif Naked, Matthew Good Band, Gob, Murray Atkinson (2007), Default, Faber Drive (2005), Theory Of A Deadman, By a Thread (2003), State Of Shock (2004), Incura (2008), Goodbye Beatdown (2009), Stars of Boulevard (2010), Head Of The Herd (2011), Gentlemen Prefer Blondes (2011), FIELDS OF GREEN (2012).
