= CHAN-DT =

Television station in Vancouver

- Vancouver, British Columbia; Canada
- Channels: Digital: 22 (UHF); Virtual: 8
- Branding: Global BC (general); Global News (newscasts)

Programming
- Affiliations: 8.1: Global

Ownership
- Owner: Corus Entertainment; (Corus Television Limited Partnership)
- Sister stations: TV: Global News: BC 1, CHBC-DT; Radio: CKNW, CFOX-FM, CFMI-FM

History
- First air date: October 31, 1960
- Former call signs: CHAN-TV (1960–2011)
- Former channel numbers: Analog: 8 (VHF, 1960–2011)
- Former affiliations: Independent (1960–1965); CTV (secondary 1961–1965, primary 1965–2001)
- Call sign meaning: "Channel"

Technical information
- Licensing authority: CRTC
- ERP: 40 kW
- HAAT: 656 m (2,152 ft)
- Transmitter coordinates: 49°21′26″N 122°57′13″W
- Translator(s): see § Transmitters

Links
- Website: globalnews.ca/bc

CHAN-DT (channel 8), branded Global British Columbia or Global BC (formerly British Columbia Television or BCTV), is a television station in Vancouver, British Columbia, Canada, serving as the West Coast flagship of the Global Television Network, a division of Corus Entertainment. The station has studios on Enterprise Street (across from the Lake City Way SkyTrain station) in the suburban city of Burnaby, which also houses Global's national news headquarters. Its transmitter is located atop Mount Seymour in the district municipality of North Vancouver.

== History ==
CHAN's original logo, used until 1963.

CHAN-TV and CHEK-TV shared this logo in the 1960s; it was often used when the stations simulcast programming.

The station first signed on the air at 4:45 p.m. on October 31, 1960. Founded by Art Jones' Vantel Broadcasting, it originally operated as an independent station. It acquired several programs from CTV upon that network's launch on October 1, 1961; it would eventually join the network formally in 1965.

The station operated from a temporary studio housed at 1219 Richards Street in Downtown Vancouver, until its full-time studio facility at 7850 Enterprise Street in Burnaby was opened in 1962. Soon after the station's launch, CHAN began installing relay transmitters across the province, and now operates over 100 rebroadcasters covering 96% of British Columbia. Through its over-the-air signal, CHAN also reaches an American audience in northwest Washington, including the Bellingham area.

BCTV's original logo, used for more than 20 years from 1973 to 1994. The logo featured the pacific dogwood flower, the provincial flower of British Columbia.

In 1963, local entrepreneur Frank Griffiths, owner of radio station CKNW (980 AM), purchased CHAN-TV from Vantel, along with nearby CBC affiliate CHEK-TV (channel 6) in the Vancouver Island city of Victoria, from its original owner, David Armstrong. At that point, CHEK began airing a few CTV programs, usually scheduled at different times than when CHAN aired them. It would become a full-time CTV affiliate in January 1981, but maintained a shuffled schedule. Griffiths' Western Broadcasting Communications later sold a minority share of the station to Selkirk Communications, before buying back full control in 1989.

In 1986, BCTV set up a fully functional broadcast studio pavilion at the Vancouver Expo 86, whose theme was transportation and communication. The BCTV pavilion allowed visitors to see, and participate, in every step of how a television station operates, as well as how newscasts and television shows were produced. The pavilion was also used by the station for coverage of the Expo, and by visiting journalists.

As early as 1971, CHAN unofficially began using the brand "BCTV". In 1973, BCTV became CHAN's official on-air branding, which remained in use until 2001, when it adopted the "Global BC" brand. The "BCTV" brand was retained for its local newscasts until February 2006. However, the "BCTV" brand became so firmly established in the province that many people still call the station by that name today.

=== Hostility to CTV ===
CHAN was CTV's third-largest affiliate, and by far the largest in Western Canada. As such, it was one of the backbones of the CTV network for many years and one of the network's most successful affiliates. However, it was always somewhat hostile toward CTV. Management believed that the network's flagship station, CFTO-TV in Toronto, had too much influence over the network. In particular, CHAN felt CFTO received favouritism in the production of CTV's Canadian programming in the late 1960s and early 1970s.

CHAN's final "BCTV" logo. The stylized pacific dogwood was modernized in autumn 1994 and was used until the affiliation switch on August 31, 2001.

Nonetheless, until 1997, CHAN bought the provincial rights to several popular series from CFTO's parent company, Baton Broadcasting. However, tensions were exacerbated that year when Baton won a licence to operate a new television station in Vancouver, CIVT-TV (channel 32), and immediately moved much of CHAN's stronger programs there. Baton won controlling interest in CTV soon after channel 32's launch, and it became an open secret that CIVT would eventually replace CHAN as the CTV station for the Vancouver market.

CHAN had signed a long-term contract with CTV several years earlier that would not expire until 1999, but was extended to 2001. However, the sign-on of CIVT meant that CHAN could only air CTV's base schedule of 40 hours of programming per week. The station had to fill the schedule with its local newscasts and lower-profile programming supplied by parent company Western International Communications. A small amount of CHUM Limited-produced programs also aired on CHAN at times during the period from 1997 to 2001, including CityLine.

=== The affiliation shakeup of 2001 ===
On June 6, 2000 WIC's stations were purchased by Canwest Global Communications, which owned the Global Television Network. As a result, CHAN was due to become the Global owned-and-operated station for all of British Columbia. Global already owned a station in Vancouver, CKVU-TV (channel 10). However, while CHAN's transmitter network covered almost all of the province, CKVU operated only three transmitters covering the Lower Mainland and Vancouver Island. CHAN had also been British Columbia's dominant news station for over three decades at the time.

CHAN-TV's affiliation agreement with CTV expired on September 1, 2001, sparking a major shakeup in British Columbia television:

- The CTV affiliation, jointly held by CHAN and sister station CHEK, moved to CIVT, which became a CTV O&O station that branded for a short time as "BC CTV" (later revised to "CTV British Columbia"). Both switches left CTV dependent on cable and satellite coverage to reach the rest of the province, as CTV has refused to set up rebroadcasters in the rest of the province. CHAN retained the rights to The Oprah Winfrey Show, which was carried by CTV in all of its other O&O markets, until the talk show ended its run in 2011.
- The Global affiliation, held by CKVU, moved to CHAN, which became the network's new O&O under the "Global BC" brand. CKVU meanwhile adopted the "ckvu13" brand and briefly became an independent station carrying CHUM-supplied programming, some of which had aired the previous season on KVOS-TV (channel 12) in Bellingham, Washington. The station became a Citytv owned-and-operated station (the eventual television system-turned-network's first expansion outside of Toronto) several months later, after the sale to CHUM was approved.
- Most of CHAN's former WIC-supplied programming, which migrated to Canwest's newly launched CH system, moved to CHEK (where other WIC programs already aired). The station was rebranded "CH Vancouver Island"; it was later renamed CHEK News in 2007 as part of CH's rebranding to E! and to simply "CHEK" in 2009 following the demise of the E! system.
- Religious station CHNU (channel 66; later a Joytv station, now an independent station), launched two weeks later, and a CHUM-owned NewNet station in Victoria, CIVI-TV (channel 53), launched just over two weeks after that.

== Programming ==
CHAN's schedule is almost identical to that of Global flagship CIII. However, it preempts some programs carried on Global's daytime schedule in other markets—primarily library programs from Corus Entertainment's specialty channels—to make room for the station's various local news programs.

In February, the station broadcasts the annual Variety Show of Hearts telethon.

=== Selected former non-network programs ===
- Vancouver based NWA All Star Wrestling (1962–1989)
- Late Show with David Letterman, aired weeknights at 12:37 a.m. from February 1994 to August 1995
- 280-JOCK followed News Hour Final at 12:05 a.m. until it was cancelled in late 1994, which pushed back Late Show to 12:37 a.m. for several months.
- The Tonight Show with Jay Leno, aired weeknights at 12:07 a.m. from August 1995 to August 2001
- As CHUM Limited held the rights to this program throughout the rest of the country, when CIVI-TV launched in nearby Victoria, British Columbia, the broadcast rights transferred over to that station.
- The Oprah Winfrey Show (1986–2011) aired at 4 p.m. on CHAN because the station owned the provincial television rights to this show, dating back to its days as a CTV affiliate. In every other market in which CTV owned a station, that network owned the local rights to Oprah.

=== News operation ===
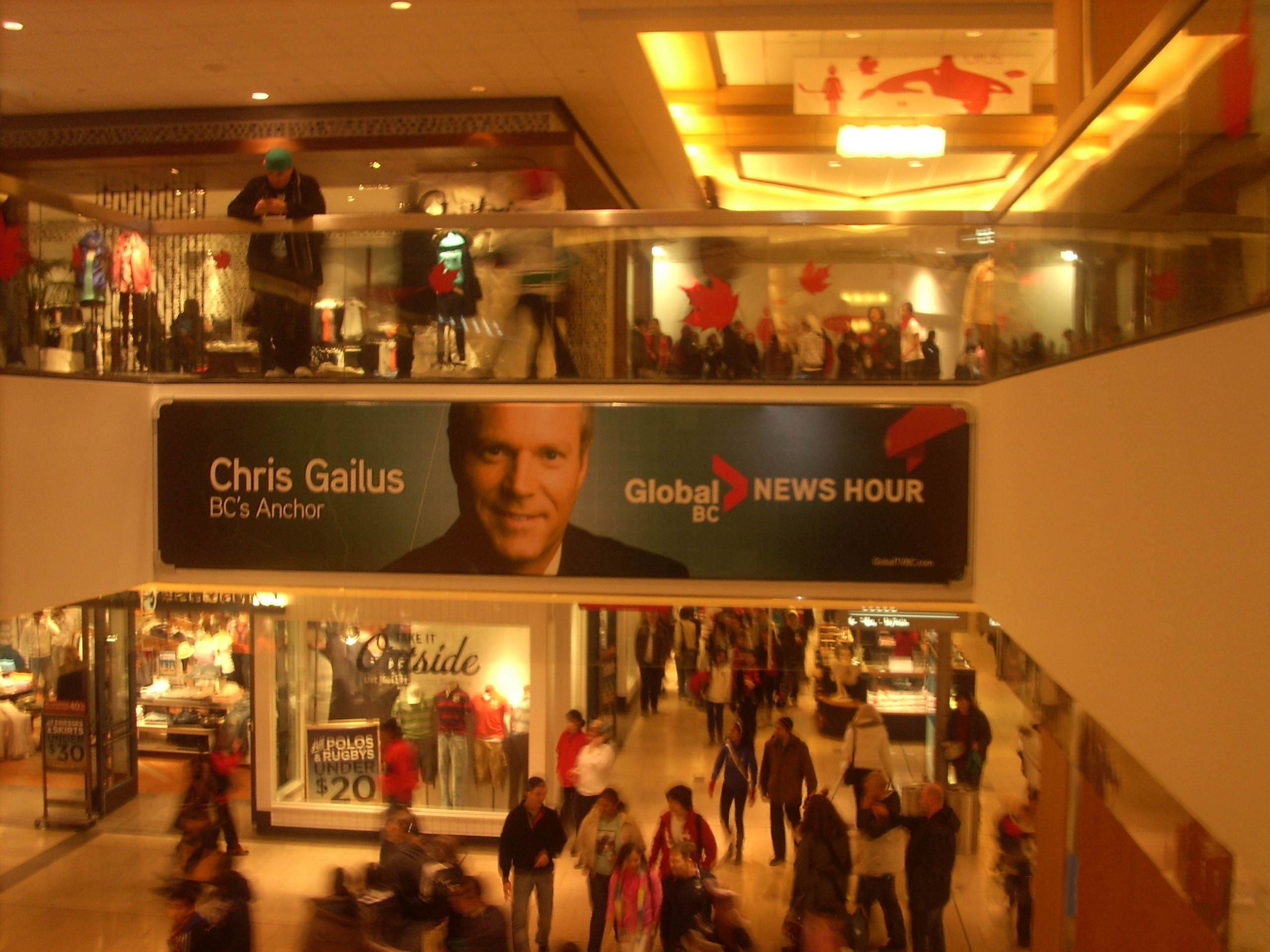
Global BC News Hour during the 2010 Winter Olympics.

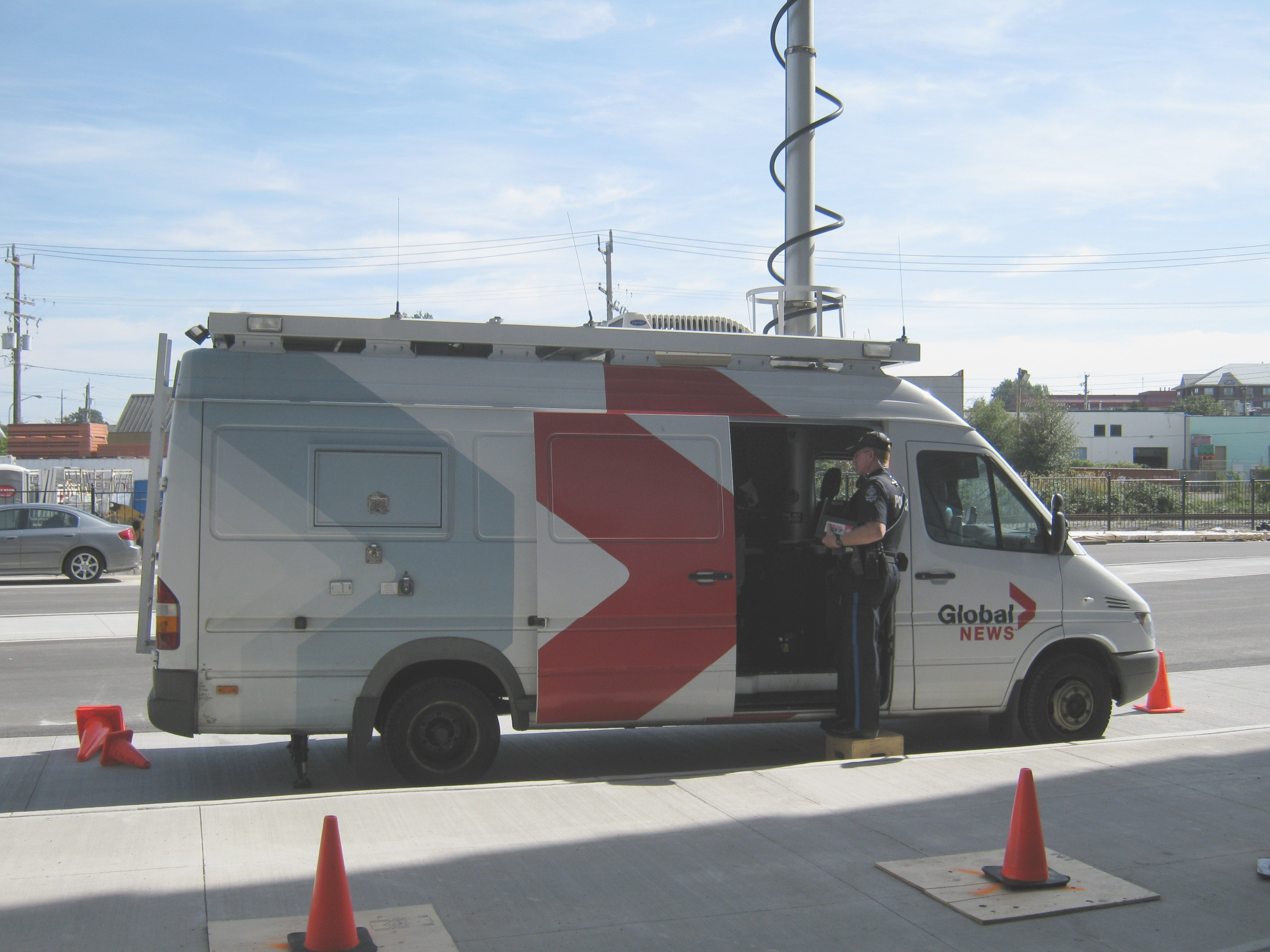
Global BC's microwave ENG vans.

CHAN-DT presently broadcasts 47 1/2 hours of locally produced newscasts each week (with 7 1/2 hours each weekday and five hours on Saturdays and Sundays); in regards to the number of hours devoted to news programming, it is the highest local newscast output among Global's television stations (either owned-and-operated or affiliated), as well as among all Canadian television stations (after the drastic reduction of Hamilton, Ontario's CHCH-DT total weekly news programming due to budget cuts in December 2015).

The station's Burnaby studios also serve as the production facilities for Global's Vancouver-based English national evening newscast Global National and the Shaw Multicultural Channel Mandarin national evening newscast Global National Mandarin (2012–2016). Unlike most Global stations that carry midday newscasts, CHAN airs its noon newscast seven days a week.

The station's newscast schedule is very similar to that of an affiliate of the Big Three television networks (ABC, CBS and NBC) in the United States, although as Global lacks a national morning news program, CHAN's weekday morning newscast runs a length similar to that of many Fox and other news-producing non-Big Three U.S. stations.

CHAN's news operation is well respected in the industry. Ever since the station first aired an hour-long newscast in the 1960s, a major part of the station's cash flow has gone into its news department, and it has garnered high ratings and major awards since then. The station's 6 p.m. News Hour broadcast has been the highest-rated local newscast in the province for many years, as well as the most-watched in all of Canada.

The station's on-air news style was even used as an inspiration for Ted Turner's CNN, as both use the newsroom as a backdrop during the broadcast. The current newsroom was constructed in 1975; it was rebuilt in the early 1990s, moving the studio out of the newsroom, but keeping it as a backdrop, and was later remodeled in 2001 and 2006.

Starting in the early 1990s, CHAN harboured ambitions of producing an early evening national newscast from its studios. In fact, several newscast pilots were produced at CHAN, suggesting the network was seriously considering such a move. However, that newscast never materialized; instead, CHAN began producing Canada Tonight, which aired on most WIC-owned stations beginning in 1993.

Two versions were produced: one for British Columbia itself, hosted by CKNW radio commentator Bill Good (who later went to CTV's current Vancouver O&O station, CIVT-TV, and retired in December 2010) and a national version, hosted by Tony Parsons, who also anchored CHAN's nightly news program, the News Hour. When Canwest purchased CHAN, the stories that were once sourced from CTV's other affiliates throughout the country were replaced by stories sourced from Global's affiliates.

From 2001, when the station became "Global BC", the news department underwent a minor retitling as BCTV News on Global. CHAN opted to keep the "BCTV" name for its newscasts, since that brand was still very well respected in the province; it also wanted to keep CIVT from using the name itself, as it contained the letters "CTV". In addition, CHAN became the headquarters for Global's national news centre and the production facility for a new national newscast, Global National (which is currently anchored by former CTV and NBC correspondent Dawna Friesen on weeknights and on weekends by Robin Gill; originally anchored beforehand by Kevin Newman), thus fulfilling its longstanding dream of producing a national newscast. The program is broadcast live-to-tape from Vancouver at 5:30 p.m. (Pacific Time Zone), airing locally prior to the 6 p.m. News Hour broadcast.

The "BCTV" brand was finally discontinued when Global introduced its new logo and on-air identity on February 6, 2006; CHAN's newscasts were rebranded as Global News (with its overall branding changing to "Global BC") at this point. In 2006, Global struck an agreement with the Canadian Traffic Network to supply the station with a Robinson R44 news helicopter with gyroscopic camera mounts. The helicopter is branded as "Global 1" – the same designation used for the news helicopters used by other Global stations – which is shared with CKNW, and is the second news helicopter in Vancouver (after that used by CIVT).

On December 16, 2009, Tony Parsons anchored his final newscast at CHAN after 34 years as anchor of the News Hour. It was expected that he would remain until after the 2010 Winter Olympics, but left much earlier than expected for unknown reasons. Parsons joined CHEK as anchor of its 10 p.m. newscast on March 15, 2010, and also began anchoring the evening newscasts at CBC Television O&O CBUT (channel 2) on April 12, 2010, remaining at both stations until his retirement in 2013.

CHAN began broadcasting its local newscasts in high definition on September 20, 2010 (Dawna Friesen was named anchor of Global National on that same date); the station debuted a new graphics package as well as an HD-ready virtual set two weeks later on October 4, which utilized the same set with minor changes to the desk. CHAN-DT uses Betacam SP analog videotape for all of its local advertisements and for pre-recorded segments within its newscasts; however, the station is slowly moving to a digital format for video production. MPEG-2 transmission is used on nearly all non-local broadcasts.

On January 11, 2012, Shaw Media filed a license application with the Canadian Radio-television and Telecommunications Commission (CRTC) – which was approved on July 20, 2012 – to launch a Category B digital-only specialty service that would serve as a British Columbia-focused news channel operated by CHAN-DT and utilizing its news staff. The channel, which was given the name Global News: BC 1, launched on March 14, 2013. It became the fourth regional news channel in Canada and the first outside of Ontario (joining Toronto-based 24-hour services CP24 and the now-defunct CityNews Channel, and Hamilton-based independent station – and former CHAN sister station under their prior Canwest ownership – CHCH-DT, which carries a heavy local newscast schedule along with some entertainment programming).

On August 27, 2012, CHAN-DT expanded its weekday morning newscast to four hours, with the addition of a half-hour at 5 a.m. (making it only the second Canadian station with a pre-5:30 a.m. morning newscast, after CHCH-DT), the 5 to 6 a.m. hour of the newscast was re-titled as the Early Morning News; in addition on September 2, 2012, the station also expanded its Sunday morning newscast to three hours with the addition of an hour at 7 a.m. The expansions of CHAN's morning newscasts were part of a benefits package that was included as a condition of the sale of the Global Television Network to Shaw Communications.

Since August 19, 2024, due to cutbacks by Corus, the newscasts of Kelowna sister station CHBC-DT have been hubbed from CHAN-DT. The newscasts feature contributions from local reporters.

==== Notable current on-air staff ====
- Dawna Friesen (2010–present); anchor of Global National
- Chris Gailus (2006–present); Global News Hour at 6 co-anchor (weekdays)

==== Notable former on-air staff ====
- Jennifer Burke (1991–1998)
- Robin Gill – (Sunday 2008–2021 and Saturday 2011–2021) anchor of Global National
- Bill Good Jr. (1993–2001)
- Frank Griffiths (1963–1994)
- Rena Heer (2005–2007)
- Deborra Hope (1981–2014)
- Jill Krop (1995–2020); former reporter/anchor from 1995 to 2015 and Global BC news director and station manager from 2015 to 2020
- Mi-Jung Lee (1992–1998)
- Pamela Martin (1977–2001)
- Tara Nelson (2005–2008)
- Kevin Newman (2001–2008)
- Harvey Oberfeld (1979–2006)
- Tony Parsons – News Hour anchor (1975–2009)
- Jack Webster (1978–1987)

== Technical information ==
=== Subchannels ===
Subchannels of CHAN-DT
Channel	Res.	Short name	Programming
8.1	1080i	CHAN-HD	Global BC

=== Analog-to-digital conversion ===
CHAN has been broadcasting in digital since April 11, 2008, on UHF channel 22. On June 29, 2011, CHAN-DT increased its effective radiated power (ERP) from 8.3 kW to its post-transitional allotment of 40 kW. CHAN's primary Vancouver transmitter was the station's only one required to go digital by the transition deadline.

CHAN shut down its analog signal, over VHF channel 8, on August 31, 2011, the official date on which Canadian television stations in CRTC-designated mandatory markets transitioned from analog to digital broadcasts. The station's digital signal remained on its pre-transition UHF channel 22, using virtual channel 8. The station's electronic program guide began functioning properly on January 28, 2012.

On October 15, 2012, CHAN-DT's transmitters in Kelowna, Penticton and Vernon were converted to digital signals. These were the station's first rebroadcast transmitters to be converted to digital as part of Shaw's efforts to convert all of its television transmitters to digital by 2016.

=== Transmitters ===
Note that the transmitters in Kelowna and the surrounding area (CHKL-TV) are in addition to CHBC-DT, a co-owned separate Global station in Kelowna that originates its own local evening newscasts, but which carries Global BC's programming at virtually all other times. CHAN is the last owned-and-operated station of the three major Canadian broadcast networks (CBC, CTV and Global) in the Vancouver market to still operate rebroadcasters throughout most of the province.

Semi-satellites are displayed in bold italics.

Station	City of license	Channel	ERP	HAAT	Transmitter coordinates
CHKL-DT	Kelowna	24 (UHF)	31.2 kW	509.6 m	49°58′2″N 119°31′50″W
CHKL-DT-1	Penticton	30 (UHF)	3 kW	365.3 m	49°39′34″N 119°34′22″W
CHKL-DT-2	Vernon	22 (UHF)	3 kW	184.6 m	50°16′58″N 119°19′13″W
CHKM-DT	Kamloops	22 (UHF)	30 kW	152.7 m	50°40′9″N 120°23′52″W
CIFG-DT	Prince George	29 (UHF)	30 kW	482 m	53°54′48″N 122°27′15″W
CHAN-DT-1	Chilliwack	31 (UHF)	0.428 kW	285.6 m	49°4′9″N 122°1′41″W
CHAN-DT-4	Courtenay	25 (UHF)	4.45 kW	380.5 m	49°44′54″N 125°14′58″W
CKTN-DT	Trail	8 (VHF)	0.6 kW	519.8 m	49°5′30″N 117°49′14″W
