= TD Tower (Vancouver) =

Office building in downtown Vancouver, British Columbia

Coordinates: 49.282722°N 123.118908°W

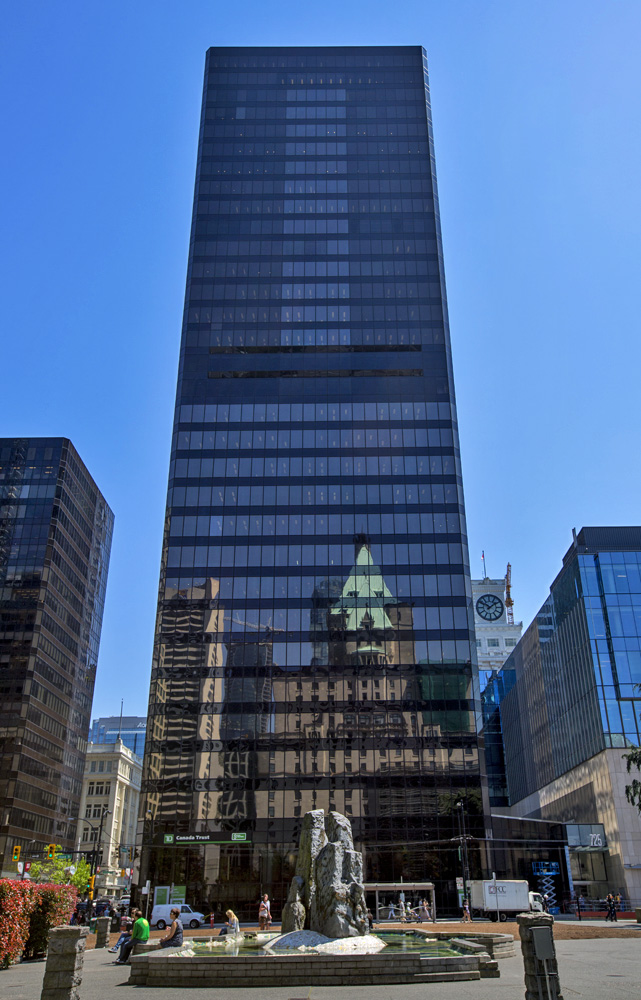

General information
- Status: Completed
- Architectural style: International
- Location: 700 West Georgia Street; Vancouver, British Columbia, Canada
- Height: 127 m (417 ft)

Technical details
- Floor count: 30

Toronto Dominion Tower is located at 700 West Georgia Street in Downtown Vancouver and is connected to part of the Pacific Centre shopping mall.

The skyscraper stands at 127 m or 30 stories tall and was completed in 1972. When the tower was built, on the site of the former second Hotel Vancouver, its black-glass facing earned it the press sobriquet "the Black Tower", and with the white design of the adjacent Eaton's building (now Nordstrom) it was considered by some an architectural disaster.

The first tenant in January 1972 was the law firm of McLaughlin, Holburn & Beaudin on the 16th floor. The firm (now named Alexander Holburn Beaudin & Lang LLP) has remained a tenant since opening and currently occupies the topmost floors.

Since 1996, the building has been the home of Corus Radio Vancouver, as well as a number of law firms, including Farris LLP, Alexander Holburn Beaudin & Lang LLP, Cansure and QAlaw.

== See also ==
- List of tallest buildings in Vancouver
