= CILK-FM =

Radio station in Kelowna

Coordinates: 49°46′06″N 119°30′03″W

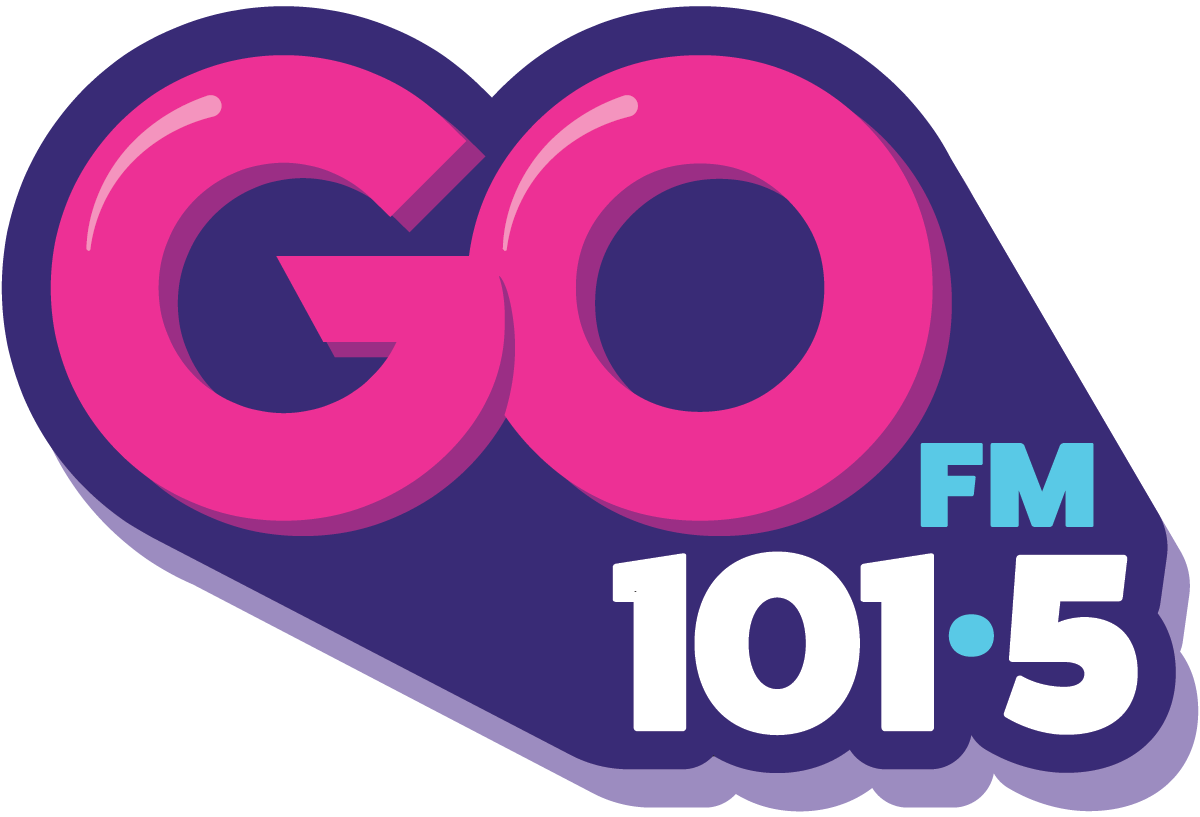
- Kelowna, British Columbia; Canada
- Broadcast area: Okanagan Valley
- Frequency: 101.5 MHz
- Branding: 101.5 GO FM

Programming
- Format: Adult contemporary

Ownership
- Owner: Vista Radio
- Sister stations: CKFR; CHSU-FM

History
- First air date: June 21, 1985
- Call sign meaning: Sounds like "silk" (former branding)

Technical information
- Class: C
- ERP: 11,000 watts average; 33,300 watts peak; horizontal polarization only
- HAAT: 114 metres (374 ft)

Links
- Webcast: Listen Live
- Website: myktownnow.com

CILK-FM is a radio station in Kelowna, British Columbia, Canada. Broadcasting at 101.5 FM, the station airs an adult contemporary format branded as 101.5 GO FM. The station is owned by Vista Radio.

== History ==
The station traces its origins to December 21, 1984 when the Canadian Radio-television and Telecommunications Commission awarded a new FM license for the Kelowna market to Silk FM Broadcasting, a company two-thirds controlled by veteran radio broadcaster Nick Frost.

CILK signed on for the first time at 101.5 MHz with a soft adult contemporary format at 10 a.m. on June 21, 1985, with an average effective radiated power of 11,000 watts. The transmitter had a northward-directed pattern from the 3,200 foot level of Okanagan Mountain, 7 kilometres south of Kelowna city centre.

On May 7, 1993, Silk FM Broadcasting applied to amend its broadcasting licence by relocating the transmitter site on Okanagan Mountain approximately three kilometres to the south and by decreasing the effective radiated power from 11,000 to 10,300 watts. The applicant indicated these changes would improve service to the Central Okanagan area. On July 19 of the same year, the CRTC approved the application.

In 1995, Frost hired a single employee, David E. Fowler, whose mandate was to start up an internet service provider: Silk Internet. The workplace, and all the associated equipment, was set up in the lobby of the radio station. A systems administrator, Stephen Hawtree, was hired soon afterwards to assist with the technical operations. By the end of the first week of operation there were five brand new Internet subscribers and within two years it became Kelowna's largest internet providers. Within five years the subscriber list was up to about 6,000. In 2000, the Silk Internet was sold to Pacific Coast Net, which itself was subsequently sold to Uniserve Communications. That same year, Silk FM Broadcasting launched an online news and local information web portal Castanet.net.

CILK's former logo, used until December 2010.

In 2004, the station adopted an adult hits format. On October 5, the CRTC announced that Silk FM Broadcasting had applied to add rebroadcast transmitters in the nearby Okanagan cities of Vernon and Penticton, in addition to its owned and operated rebroadcast transmitters at Big White Mountain and Magna Bay. On February 28, 2005, the CRTC denied the application to add the transmitters into Vernon and Penticton on the grounds that it would result in a significant increase to the coverage of CILK into the adjacent radio markets.

On May 3, 2006, several years after Frost bought out minority shareholders of Silk FM Broadcasting and became sole owner of the company, he announced the sale of CILK-FM and its two broadcast transmitters to Standard Radio for a total purchase price of $9.25 million CAD. The sale was approved unconditionally by the CRTC in December 2006.

In the summer of 2007, CILK modified its format to adult contemporary, playing contemporary and modern hits. In October 2007, Astral Media acquired Standard's terrestrial radio and television assets, including CILK. By January 2011, the station became 101.5 EZ Rock, keeping the AC format. By March 2011, the station was added at the Canadian hot AC panel per Mediabase status, joining sister CHR/Top 40 station CHSU-FM, but later moved to the Canadian AC panel the following week.

Logo as "EZ Rock", 2011-2020

On December 27, 2020, as part of a mass format reorganization by Bell Media, CILK rebranded as Move 101.5. While the station would run jockless for the first week of the format, on-air staff would return on January 4, 2021.

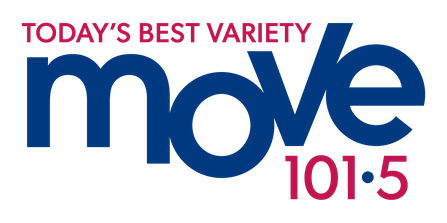
Logo as "Move Radio", 2020-2025

On February 8, 2024, Bell announced a restructuring that included the sale of 45 of its 103 radio stations to seven buyers, subject to approval by the CRTC, including CILK, which is to be sold to Vista Radio. The application was approved on February 13, 2025. On April 15, 2025, Vista rebranded the station under its new Go FM branding.

== Rebroadcasters ==
Rebroadcasters of CILK-FM
City of licence	Identifier	Frequency	Power	Class	RECNet	CRTC Decision
Big White Mountain	VF2329	103.9 FM	30 watts	LP	Query	98-525
Celista	CILC-FM	94.7 FM	50 watts	LP	Query	2001-266
