= List of Canadian television personalities =

This is a list of Canadian television personalities. It should only include people associated with non-fiction programming, not actors.

== A ==
- Steve Anthony, MuchMusic VJ and morning show host
- Thalia Assuras, newscaster
- Nahlah Ayed, journalist

== B ==
- Isabel Bassett, journalist
- Bryan Baeumler
- Ralph Benmergui, journalist and talk show host
- Rod Black, sportscaster
- Joëlle-Ann Blanchette, television personality and communications advisor
- Al Boliska
- Mike Bullard, talk show host
- Arlene Bynon, talk show host

== C ==
- Elaine Callei, 1970s daytime talk show host and cohost of Canada AM
- Rick Campanelli, entertainment reporter and MuchMusic VJ
- Maggie Cassella, talk show host
- Erin Cebula
- Don Cherry, sportscaster
- Catherine Clark, journalist
- Tom Clark, newscaster
- Adrienne Clarkson, arts journalist
- Steven Cojocaru, fashion critic and correspondent for Entertainment Tonight
- Ernie Coombs, children's entertainer known as "Mr. Dressup"

== D ==
- Marilyn Denis, talk show host
- Bernard Derome, newscaster
- Alexandre Despatie
- James Doohan
- Dwight Drummond, newscaster
- Francis D'Souza, journalist
- Mario Dumont, talk show host
- Darren Dutchyshen, sportscaster

== E ==
- Rosey Edeh
- Tyrone Edwards, MuchMusic and eTalk
- Erica Ehm, MuchMusic VJ
- Mary Jo Eustace, cooking show host

== F ==
- Peter Fallico
- Jebb Fink, talk show host
- Dave Foley, Etobicoke comedian
- Kevin Frankish
- Dawna Friesen, newscaster
- Liza Fromer

== G ==
- Vicki Gabereau, talk show host
- Martine Gaillard, sportscaster
- Chris Gailus, newscaster
- Céline Galipeau, newscaster
- Sean Gehon, entertainment reporter
- Tom Gibney
- Anne-France Goldwater, court show judge
- Bill Good, newscaster
- Richard Gizbert
- Tom Green, Pembroke
- Peter Gzowski, talk show host

== H ==
- Avery Haines, newscaster
- Monty Hall, game show host
- Adrian Harewood, newscaster
- Phil Hartman, sketch comedian
- Jane Hawtin, talk show host
- Jennifer Hedger, sportscaster
- Cheryl Hickey, entertainment reporter
- Heather Hiscox, newscaster
- Johnny Hockin
- Mike Holmes, home renovation contractor
- Bob Homme, children's entertainer known as "The Friendly Giant"
- Tommy Hunter, variety show host
- Helen Hutchinson, journalist
- Chris Hyndman, HGTV designer and talk show host

== I ==
- Marci Ien, newscaster and talk show host
- Orin Isaacs, talk show bandleader

== J ==
- Doug James, former CNN correspondent, former CBC reporter and host
- Stu Jeffries, VJ
- Peter Jennings, newscaster
- Jenny Jones, London television host

== K ==
- Arthur Kent, journalist
- Peter Kent, newscaster
- Tanya Kim
- Harvey Kirck, newscaster
- Keltie Knight, entertainment journalist
- Ken Kostick, cooking show host
- Elvira Kurt

== L ==
- Lisa LaFlamme, newscaster
- Amanda Lang, business newscaster
- Ricardo Larrivée, chef
- René Lecavalier
- Philippe Létourneau, driving expert
- Art Linkletter, talk show host
- Elaine "Lainey" Lui, entertainment reporter and talk show host

== M ==
- Ron MacLean, sportscaster
- Rita MacNeil, variety show host
- Rebecca Makonnen
- Howie Mandel
- Peter Mansbridge, newscaster
- Jay Manuel
- Pamela Martin, newscaster
- Gord Martineau, newscaster
- Shahir Massoud, chef and talk show host
- Bob McAdorey, entertainment reporter
- Mark McKinney, Ottawa comedian
- Ann Medina, journalist and documentarian
- Anne-Marie Mediwake, newscaster
- Suhana Meharchand, newscaster
- Rick Mercer, comedian and commentator
- Wendy Mesley, journalist
- Jon Montgomery, The Amazing Race Canada
- Tracy Moore, talk show host
- Anne Mroczkowski, newscaster
- Ben Mulroney

== N ==
- Pascale Nadeau, newscaster
- Kevin Newman, newscaster

== O ==
- Candice Olson
- David Onley, journalist
- Jay Onrait, sportscaster
- Seamus O'Regan, journalist
- Dan O'Toole, sportscaster
- Dvira Ovadia

== P ==
- Amanda Parris
- Tony Parsons, newscaster
- Norm Perry, newscaster
- Russell Peters, comedian
- Dini Petty, talk show host
- Benjamin Quddus Philippe, MTV presenter
- Suzanne Pinel, children's entertainer known as "Marie-Soleil"
- Sue Prestedge, sportscaster
- Valerie Pringle, newscaster
- Dina Pugliese, talk show host

== R ==
- Graham Richardson, newscaster
- Sarah Richardson, HGTV designer
- Sandie Rinaldo, newscaster
- Sandra Rinomato, HGTV host (Property Virgins, Buy Herself)
- John Roberts, news reporter
- Leslie Roberts, newscaster
- Lloyd Robertson, newscaster
- Ken Rockburn, talk show host
- Ann Rohmer, newscaster

== S ==
- Steven Sabados, HGTV designer and talk show host
- Morley Safer, Toronto-born television reporter
- Simi Sara
- Joe Schlesinger, journalist and documentarian
- Ken Shaw, newscaster
- Trish Stratus, WWE wrestler and star of the TV show Armed and Famous
- George Stroumboulopoulos, talk show host
- David Suzuki
- Diana Swain, newscaster

== T ==
- Jane Taber
- Tamara Taggart
- Mutsumi Takahashi, newscaster
- Jan Tennant, newscaster
- Scott Thompson, sketch comedian
- Beverly Thomson, journalist
- Kathy Tomlinson, Canadian Broadcasting Corporation reporter
- Ziya Tong
- Cheryl Torrenueva
- Debbie Travis
- Alex Trebek, game show host
- Peter Trueman, newscaster

== V ==
- Jennifer Valentyne
- Jody Vance, sportscaster
- Adnan Virk

== W ==
- Bill Walker, variety and game show host
- Pamela Wallin, journalist and talk show host
- Patrick Watson, journalist and documentarian
- Bill Welychka, MuchMusic VJ
- Murray Westgate, advertising pitchman
- Roz Weston
- Brian Williams, sportscaster
- Harland Williams, sketch comedian

== Y ==
- Benny Yau
- Elwy Yost, TV host of classic movies on TVO's Magic Shadows and Saturday Night at the Movies
- Andrew Younghusband

== Z ==
- Mary Zilba, star of Real Housewives of Vancouver
