= CityNews =

Canadian television newscast

- Type: Subsidiary
- Industry: Media
- Genre: News
- Founded: September 28, 1975; 51 years ago (CityPulse); August 2, 2005; 21 years ago (CityNews)
- Headquarters: Rogers Building, Toronto, Ontario, Canada
- Area served: National, Regional
- Key people: Tony Staffieri - Rogers Communications Interim President & CEO; Jordan Banks - President of Rogers Sports & Media
- Production output: Television, radio, and internet news
- Owner: Rogers Sports & Media (Rogers Communications)
- Parent: Citytv
- Website: www.citynews.ca

CityNews is the title of news and current affairs programming on Rogers Sports & Media's Citytv network in Canada. The newscast division was founded on September 28, 1975 as CityPulse as a standalone local newscast on the network's Toronto station owned by CHUM Limited. Through the acquisitions of the Edmonton, Winnipeg and Calgary A-Channel stations in 2004, it was relaunched under the CityNews brand on August 2, 2005 and later expanded to Montreal in 2012. The remaining Citytv stations airs the news headlines segments during each station's Breakfast Television morning show.

Before the 2017–2018 relaunch of CityNews nationally, Citytv stations outside Toronto had their midday and evening news programs cancelled in 2006, and the remaining news programming on these stations (such as the nationally-broadcast CityNews International) was cancelled in early 2010.

After a soft launch in 2020 via CIWW/CJET-FM Ottawa, in June 2021 Rogers extended the CityNews branding to its news radio stations.

== CityNews Toronto ==
=== History ===
CityPulse at Six open titles, 2003

The newscast was broadcast in Toronto as CityPulse as a pilot episode on September 28, 1975, and as a second pilot episode on September 12, 1976. The first regular episode of CityPulse aired on September 12, 1977. CITY-TV's newscasts aired under the CityPulse title for the final time on August 1, 2005, and were rebranded as CityNews the following day. While the station claims that it was the first news show to abandon the traditional anchor desk, CBS News in the United States had done this as early as the 1950s under Edward R. Murrow. Its main innovation in television news was to have its reporters play a more participatory role in their stories. Elements of it were also taken from then-sister station ATV in the Maritimes, whose Live at 5 newscast, launched in 1982, had lead anchor Dave Wright roaming around the ATV newsroom and talking with the reporters.

By the mid-1980s, the newscast's style, pioneered by Moses Znaimer, was promoted as a "format" for local news shows to copy around North America. The show has been duplicated by other television stations owned by CHUM Limited and its format has been licensed to several television stations around the world, such as Citytv Barcelona and Citytv Bogotá. Other attempts to clone the format with regional changes have also been attempted; notably, two American attempts at a CityPulse-style newscast debuted within months of each other in 1993: KCOP-TV in Los Angeles with 13 Real News, and KIRO-TV in Seattle with what was dubbed "News Outside the Box" (the latter station attempted to leverage its then-sister radio stations as well). Both attempts failed and by 1994 both stations had reverted to "traditional" newscasts.

Until 1987, the anchors on CityPulse sat behind an anchor desk in a dark studio with two orange-red-black striped beams and a television set between the two anchors. CityPulse at Six was anchored by Gord Martineau and Dini Petty for most of the years from 1980 to 1987. Weather presenters during that era included CHUM Radio veteran Jay Nelson, Brian Hill, Greg Rist, and David Onley. Sports anchors included Jim McKenny, Russ Salzberg, John Saunders, Debbie Van Kiekebelt, and Ann Rohmer.

CityPulse Tonight, known as CityPulse News at 10 prior to 1981, was anchored by Bill Cameron, later by Gord Martineau, and then Anne Mroczkowski. In 1987, Mroczkowski moved to the supper-hour show to co-anchor with Martineau. J.D. (John) Roberts began his news anchoring career as anchor of CityPulse Tonight after several years as an entertainment reporter and MuchMusic video jockey.

On May 4, 1987, CityPulse moved into a newsroom set at 299 Queen Street West in Toronto along with the other station operations, from 99 Queen Street East. After the move, CityPulse began to move the anchors away from a central desk, positioning them around the newsroom (such as the assignment desk, equipped with police radios, banks of monitors, and perhaps the most unique feature, a map of Toronto with blinking lights indicating major highways, positioned behind a large glass wall, allowing the anchors to draw on the glass with markers to indicate the locations of stories and incidents), or walking through the newsroom.

From 1987 to 1989, Dini Petty anchored CityWide at 5:30 pm.

Hourly news update segments, akin to the "24-Hour News Source" format popular in the US at the time, were introduced in the early 1990s, initially to cover the Gulf War (known as Gulfwatch). The updates were refined into a regular feature after the end of the war. These were branded as CityPulse (Overnight) NewsFlashes, for shorter updates (typically a shot of the darkened newsroom, followed by shots of area traffic cameras; a ticker would display one or two headlines, sports scores, a weather forecast, and/or the time of the next update; the sounds of the newsroom and/or a police scanner would be heard underneath), or as simply CityPulse Updates, for longer updates anchored by a CityPulse reporter (often Kevin Frankish) from the assignment desk, who, in a unique twist, would operate the camera themselves via a control device. From 1998 until the 2000s, CITY produced CityLive simulcasted with its new news channel CablePulse24.

CityNews opening titles from 2005

By March 2008, CityNews Toronto was struggling in the ratings, coming in third (with an average of 100,000 viewers) after CTV (326,000 viewers) and Global (126,000). On January 21, 2008, CityLive was relaunched as CityNews at 5, drawing a scant 1% share of the Toronto market at 5 p.m.

In July 2008, Rogers filed an application with the Canadian Radio-television and Telecommunications Commission (CRTC) to launch a separate 24-hour news station to be affiliated with Citytv Toronto, and to be known as CityNews (Toronto). The application was approved on December 10, 2008. The new station was in direct competition with CP24 which was launched on October 3, 2011, as CityNews Channel.

In December 2008, Citytv laid off the entire CityNews Entertainment unit. Entertainment reporters Larysa Harapyn and Liz West were released, and entertainment stories were then read by the anchors.

In September 2009, Citytv moved into its now former newsroom at 33 Dundas Street East (Yonge-Dundas Square, now Sankofa Square) in Downtown Toronto.

On January 19, 2010, CityNews at Noon, CityOnline and CityNews at Five were cancelled as part of layoffs and restructuring within the Citytv stations. Many long-time CityNews on-air personalities, including Anne Mroczkowski and Laura DiBattista, were let go.

Citytv Toronto reinstated the 6 and 11 p.m. newscasts on Saturday and Sunday evenings on March 5, 2011, with Pam Seatle anchoring the 6 p.m. newscast, and Melanie Ng anchoring at 11 p.m. On September 5, 2011, Citytv Toronto also reinstated CityNews at Five with anchors Francis D'Souza, Tom Hayes, and Avery Haines. The following day on September 6, 2011, Breakfast Television on all five of Citytv's owned-and-operated stations expanded to three-and-a-half hours, from 5:30-9 a.m. Avery Haines then left CityNews at Five to start a segment called "The Inside Story" that features on Tuesdays and Thursdays on CityNews at Six.

On August 13, 2012, CITY-TV expanded its nightly 11 p.m. newscast, CityNews Tonight, from 30 minutes to one hour.

In 2015, the station changed the format of its evening newscasts, removing the in-studio anchor and having all stories presented by videojournalists on the field. The reduced cost format is designed to appeal to younger viewers with a more "raw" presentation, and appeal to increased trust in the reporters and their journalism.

In 2024, Citytv changed its format from being anchorless with an in studio presenter opening the newscast alongside delivering many of the stories standing in their newsroom, to an in studio anchor sitting down at a desk to present the news for the first time since 1987. With the format change, Citytv announced Cynthia Mulligan as their new Chief Correspondent and Anchor for CityNews at 5 and CityNews at 6 with other reporters hosting CityNews Tonight and CityNews Weekend.

On March 15, 2025, Citytv moved from their now former building at 33 Dundas Street East to the Rogers Toronto campus at 333 Bloor Street East joining other Rogers Sports and Media television and radio stations such as 680 NewsRadio. Their last newscast at 33 Dundas Street East was on March 14, 2025 with Breakfast Television making the move as well.

=== CityNews on CP24 ===
CP24 logo.

From its launch in 1998 until 2008, CityNews and local cable news channel, CP24 were a combined operation sharing the same newsroom and studio space at 299 Queen Street West. CP24 simulcasted Citytv news programs such as Breakfast Television and CityNews. CP24 also reran most CityNews programming immediately after it was done airing live. At that time, CP24 was jointly owned by CHUM Limited and Sun Media, who owned the channel until 2004.

In July 2006, Bell Globemedia (later CTVglobemedia and now Bell Media) announced a bid to purchase Citytv/CP24's parent company, CHUM Limited. A year later, the CRTC approved the sale on the condition that the Citytv stations be sold. Shortly after, the sale of Citytv stations to Rogers Communications was finalized.

For a short period, things remained the same; Citytv anchors continued to anchor and contribute to CP24 and shows were simulcast between the two channels until CTV/Rogers announced the restructuring of its employees between to two channels beginning in November 2007, such as the hiring of new CP24-only and CityNews-only personalities.

In November 2008, CP24 moved most of its operations from its original newsroom, shared with Citytv, to a new state-of-the-art newsroom on the second floor with windows facing Queen Street West and at the same time CP24 unveiled a new look to its on-screen format. CP24 continued to simulcast CityNews programming up until December 10, 2008, when CTV pulled almost all Citytv news programming with the exception of Breakfast Television. That night, CTV News at Six replaced CityNews at Six, which had remained in place since the channel began broadcasting in 1998. Critics had speculated that the latter change was due to the CRTC's approval of Citytv Toronto planning on launching CityNews Channel. One of the final ties was severed on March 26, 2009, when CP24 dropped its simulcast of Breakfast Television and launched its own morning show, CP24 Breakfast.

Following the layoffs at the Citytv stations announced on January 19, 2010, CP24 extended its Live at 5 broadcast from 15 minutes to 30, and also launched another half-hour newscast, Live at 5:30. The show was featured a CP24 personality that hosted both Live at 5 and Live at 5:30; having interviews and updating Toronto on what is happening in the city. In addition, two other CP24 anchors would host the show, one co-hosting at 5pm and the other co-hosting at 5:30pm, bringing Toronto's Top Stories. By July 2012, Live at 5 and Live at 5:30 were brought back to the regular CP24 news format and with just one anchor 5pm and one anchor for 5:30pm.

=== CityNews Weather ===
CityNews is the only newscast in Canada that operates its own weather monitoring stations across the Greater Toronto Area. In addition to 20 weather stations, CityNews introduced a CityNews Weather LiveEye, a mobile unit that can monitor the weather anywhere.

On June 21, 2007, CityNews launched CityNews Weather Online, a desktop program that is more convenient than accessing their website. The program includes features to alert the user when a weather watch or warning is issued.

In November 2008, CityNews launched CityNews Weather Webcast, which are video weather forecasts recorded each day by one of the weather team members.

=== CityNews Webcast ===
On February 14, 2007, CityNews created the CityNews Webcast, a downloadable news podcast based in Toronto. There are three Webcasts uploaded on weekdays: in the morning, presented by Kevin Frankish from Breakfast Television; in the afternoon, presented by CityNews at Six anchor Gord Martineau; and the final Webcast in the evening, presented by the anchor hosting CityNews Tonight.

=== Theme music and opens ===
The CityPulse newscast originally began with the instrumental version of "Masterpiece" by The Temptations. In 1979, it was changed to a rendition of "Gonna Fly Now" by Maynard Ferguson; the theme was remixed and rearranged well into the 2000s. The theme for CityPulse Tonight continued to be "Masterpiece" until the early 1980s. From 1985 until 1994, "Pentatus" by Graham Shaw was used as the theme music for CityPulse Tonight. The current theme is a custom-composed music piece.

== CityNews Channel and CityNews 24/7 ==
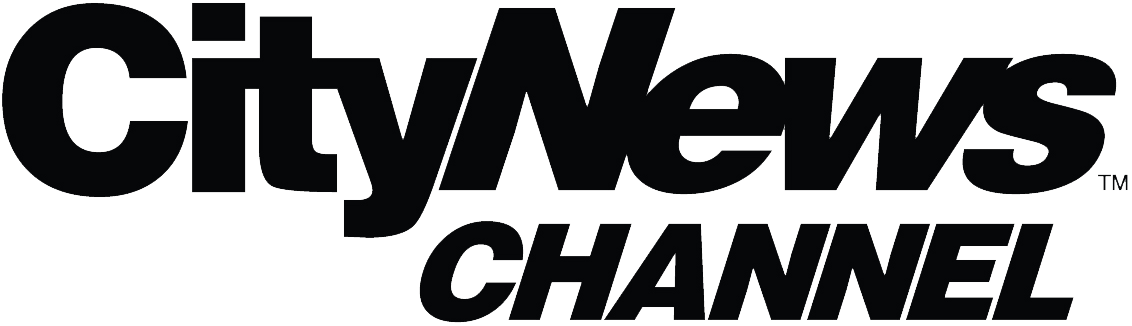
CityNews Channel logo.

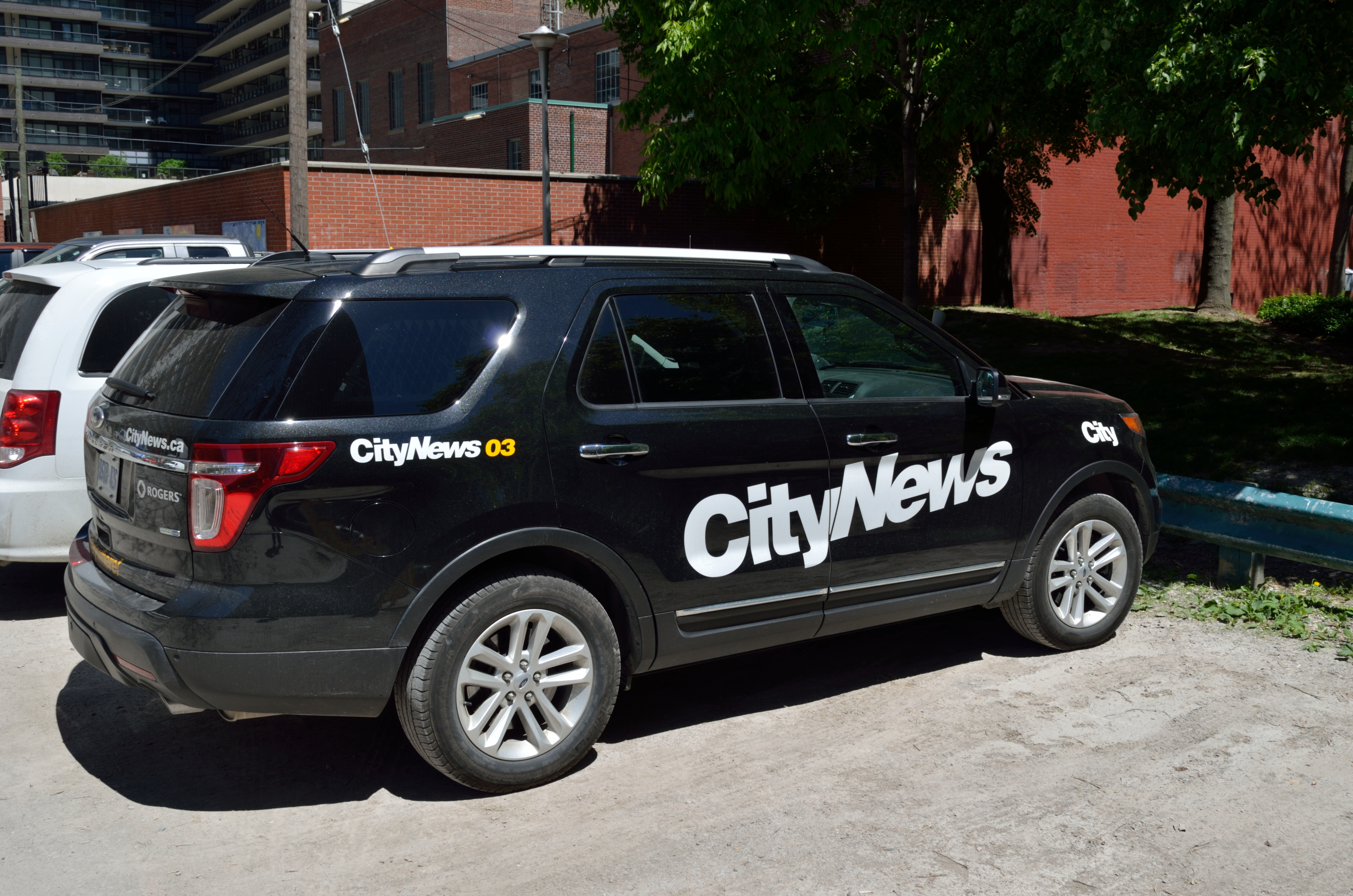
A CityNews vehicle parked in Toronto.

On May 30, 2011, Rogers Media announced plans to launch a digital cable specialty channel licensed as a Category B service with the Canadian Radio-television and Telecommunications Commission called CityNews Channel, a 24-hour news network based in Toronto that would bring together resources from a number of Rogers-owned news and media properties, including Citytv Toronto, 680 News radio, and Maclean's magazine. The channel featured "an enriched and interactive screen format," likely similar to that of Bell Media's CP24, the channel's main competitor.

CityNews Channel was launched on October 3, 2011, using the same news wheel format as 680News, with traffic and weather reports on the :1s, sports news at :15 and :45 and business news at :26 and :56 past the hour. The channel's anchors were rotated depending on the time period. Rolling news programming aired weekdays from 9:30 a.m. – 5 p.m., weekends from 7 a.m. – 6 p.m. and nightly from 7–11 p.m. ET; all Citytv Toronto news programming is simulcast on the channel (including weekday morning news/talk program Breakfast Television and nightly 11 p.m. newscast CityNews Tonight, which both feature an additional half-hour seen exclusively on CityNews Channel); an audio simulcast of 680News featuring live traffic camera feeds throughout Toronto also runs from 1-5:30 a.m. weeknights and midnight – 7 a.m. weekends.

Beginning April 14, 2012, Citytv Toronto ran a simulcast of CityNews Channel's weekend morning news programming every Saturday morning from 7–8 a.m. and Sunday mornings from 7–9 a.m. The channel abruptly ceased operations at 9 a.m. on May 30, 2013.

CityNews Channel was revived as CityNews 24/7 in 2022, this time as a streaming channel, similar to those offered online by Global News. The channel is operated in Toronto and West versions, and carried via the CityNews digital platforms, as well as Rogers' Amazon Prime Video Channels service Citytv+ and Rogers Xfinity Channel 100.

== CityNews in other markets ==
CityPulse was launched in Vancouver in 2002 when CKVU-TV was rebranded as "Citytv Vancouver". With the expansion of Citytv from two to five stations in August 2005, the newscasts on all five Citytv stations were renamed CityNews.

On July 12, 2006, coincident with the announcement of CTVglobemedia's plans to take over CHUM Limited, all prime-time CityNews programs, with the exception of those on CITY in Toronto, were immediately cancelled, with 281 CHUM employees across the country laid off. On CKAL Calgary and CKEM Edmonton, CityNews at Six and CityNews Tonight was replaced with a new half-hour newsmagazine called Your City. CHMI Winnipeg had been slated to launch its own version in January 2007 according to a news release, but it never materialized. CKVU's newscasts were not replaced, although a noon newscast based on the Breakfast Television format called Lunch Television was launched in early 2009. CityNews at Noon in Calgary and Edmonton, and Lunch Television in Vancouver continued until January 19, 2010.

When the show made the transition to CityNews, it lost several features, such as the CityPulse Webtest, which had existed since the 1980s as a phone-in contest. The new format on CHMI, which had been called A-Channel News (which was later used by CTVglobemedia's A stations, under the name A News, prior to the rebranding of the A system to CTV Two in August 2011), had lost nearly half of its audience for the 6 p.m. newscast before its cancellation.

On June 8, 2007, the CRTC approved the CTV takeover of CHUM. However, the five Citytv stations could not be sold to CTVglobemedia due to concentration of media ownership regulations. On June 11, Rogers Communications announced that it would buy the five Citytv stations from CTVglobemedia. The sale was approved on September 28 and became official on October 31, 2007. CTVglobemedia retained ownership of CP24, the 24-hour Toronto local news station that shared many programs and personalities with Toronto's Citytv station, including CityNews.

On January 19, 2010, Your City, based in CKEM-TV Edmonton and CKAL-TV Calgary, Lunch Television, and the comedy show The CityNews List on CKVU-TV Vancouver were also cancelled. In Winnipeg, the news part of Breakfast Television is called CityNews.

The Jim Pattison Group stations (CFJC-TV Kamloops, CKPG-TV Prince George, and CHAT-TV Medicine Hat) produce their own weeknight local newscasts, but do not produce their own local versions of Breakfast Television nor title their newscasts under the CityNews branding. In fact, despite keeping the same on-air branding and logos used as affiliates of the E! system, they do not bear the Citytv branding. However, as part of a renewal of their affiliation agreements with Citytv on May 3, 2012, CKPG, CHAT and CFJC were to begin simulcasting the Vancouver edition of Breakfast Television from CKVU-DT, starting in fall 2012 as the stations began carrying 90% of Citytv's morning and daytime programming from the CKVU schedule grid.

On June 5, 2017, Rogers announced that it would return local early evening and late night newscasts to its Citytv owned-and-operated stations in Calgary, Edmonton, Vancouver, Winnipeg and, through an expansion of CJNT-DT's news operations, Montreal. The hour-long newscasts – which aired at 6:00 and 11:00 p.m. local time – premiered in Edmonton and Winnipeg on September 4, 2017, while the remainder of the announced markets will launch newscasts in early 2018. On July 12, 2018, it was announced that the new Calgary, Montreal, and Vancouver newscasts would premiere on September 3.

== CityNews Radio ==
On December 3, 2020, at 10:00 a.m., CIWW in Ottawa (previously known as "1310 News") adopted the CityNews branding, and began simulcasting on sister station CJET-FM 101.1 (formerly CKBY-FM, switching from its previous country music format as "Country 101.1") while continuing to broadcast on AM 1310. (The original CKBY's format and call letters were concurrently moved over to 92.3 FM, which previously used the CJET-FM calls.)

In June 2021, Rogers announced that it would rebrand its five other all-news and news-talk radio stations under the CityNews brand. The rebranding took effect on October 18, 2021. Three of the stations – CFTR 680 Toronto, CFFR 660 Calgary, and CKWX 1130 Vancouver – are co-located with Citytv stations, while a fourth – CKGL 570 Kitchener – is located in a secondary market for Citytv Toronto. The move brought the CityNews brand to Atlantic Canada, where Rogers operates CJNI-FM 95.7 Halifax but does not operate a Citytv station.

On October 26, 2023, Rogers announced it would discontinue the news/talk format on both CIWW and CJET-FM effective at 1:00 p.m. that day, with CJET returning to a country music format and the CIWW licence expected to be returned to the CRTC for cancellation.

In March 2024, as part of a reimaging of CityNews introduced that month, Rogers rebranded its news stations as NewsRadio. On July 7, 2026, all NewsRadio stations outside of Toronto were closed effective immediately as part of cuts by Rogers.

=== Current stations ===
Location	Call sign	Frequency	Format
Toronto, Ontario	CFTR	680 AM	All-news

=== Former stations ===
Location	Call sign	Frequency	Format	Ended	Subsequent format
Calgary, Alberta	CFFR	660 AM	All-news	July 7, 2026	went silent
Halifax, Nova Scotia	CJNI-FM	95.7 FM	News/Talk/Sports	July 7, 2026	went silent
Kitchener, Ontario	CKGL	570 AM	News/Talk	July 7, 2026	went silent
Ottawa, Ontario	CIWW	1310 AM	News/Talk	October 26, 2023	went silent
Smiths Falls, Ontario	CJET-FM	101.1 FM	News/Talk (simulcast of CIWW)	October 26, 2023	101.1 FM reverted to former Country format, after swapping back call letters and frequency with CKBY-FM
Vancouver, British Columbia	CKWX	1130 AM	All-news	July 7, 2026	went silent

== Former programs ==
=== CityNews International ===
Soon after the cancellation of the local CityNews broadcasts in Vancouver, Calgary, Edmonton and Winnipeg in 2008, a new half-hour program called CityNews International was launched. The program was produced in the Citytv Toronto studios and featured many of the same on-air personalities as the local Citytv Toronto's CityNews. CityNews International aired at 6:30 and 11:30 p.m. in Calgary and Edmonton. In Winnipeg, it ran at 11:00 p.m., and in Vancouver at 6 and 11:35 p.m. In Toronto, Citytv aired the newscast at 11:35 p.m. CityNews International was canceled during the 2010 cuts. The title of the program remains in use on Citytv Toronto for the international news segments shown during its evening newscasts.

=== Your City ===
The replacement program in Calgary and Edmonton for the evening/late-evening program was a magazine type of show called Your City.

The show aired five nights a week at 6:00 p.m., with a repeat at 11:00 p.m. The format of the show consisted of a top story, a report about theatre or other cultural life, various restaurant and wine reviews and an assortment of other general interest stories.

=== CityNews at Noon ===
The noon newscast aired in Toronto, Calgary and Edmonton. It was hosted by Francis D'Souza and Laura DiBattista in Toronto, Asha Tomlinson in Edmonton and Aisling Slattery in Calgary.

=== CityOnline ===
A lunchtime half-hour talk show about Toronto news and current affairs aired weekdays at 12:30 p.m., following Toronto's CityNews at Noon. The show encouraged audience participation with its phone-in format. Viewers could also e-mail and vote on a daily phone poll.

CityOnline was hosted by Kris Reyes. Previous hosts included Ann Rohmer (CP24), Tracy Moore (Cityline), and Laura DiBattista (CBC Radio).

=== Lunch Television ===
Lunch Television was hosted by Kyle Donaldson and Michel McDermott and aired in the Vancouver market.

An earlier program, also titled Lunch Television, aired on the original Toronto station during the 1990s.

== Anchors and reporters ==
=== National ===
- Lisa LaFlamme - special correspondent

=== Citytv Toronto ===
Anchors

- Tim Bolen - Breakfast Television co-host (2025–present)
- Dina Pugliese - Breakfast Television co-host (2025–present)

Weather

- Frank Ferragine - weather specialist; Breakfast Television (weekday mornings)
- Adam Stiles
- Stella Acquisto
- Natasha Ramsahai

Sports (CityNews)

- Lindsay Dunn

Reporters

- Cynthia Mulligan - general assignment reporter
- Pam Seatle - general assignment reporter
- Mark McAllister - general assignment reporter

== Past presenters ==
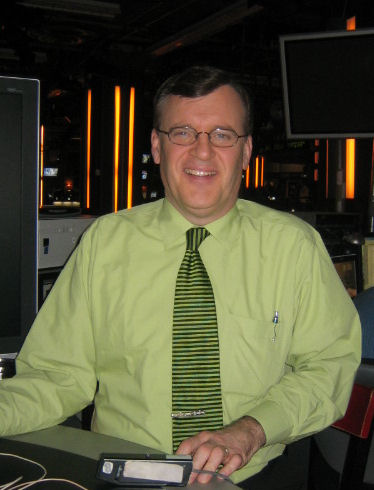
David C. Onley after taping an episode of Home Page.

=== Citytv Toronto ===
- Thalia Assuras (later moved to ABC and then CBS); now host of energyNOW! (American Clean Skies Foundation)
- Hugh Burrill - former sports anchor/reporter. Now at The Fan 590
- Bill Cameron anchor; 1978–1983; (later moved to the Canadian Broadcasting Corporation); deceased
- Lance Chilton - CityNews/CP24 reporter (later anchor at A-Channel in Barrie and real estate agent in Barrie area)
- Jojo Chintoh - reporter and crime specialist; 1978-2010 (now President at El Mundo Habitat Development Corporation)
- Mark Dailey - CityNews Tonight anchor, crime specialist and continuity announcer known as "The Voice of Citytv"; 1979-2010 (died on December 6, 2010, due to prostate cancer)
- Denise Donlon (later CEO of Sony Canada and executive director of CBC Radio's English-language services 2008–2011)
- Dwight Drummond - CityNews at Five anchor and crime specialist (now 5, 5:30 and 6 p.m. anchor at CBC Toronto)
- Francis D'Souza - Former anchor CityNews at Five (weeknights); also reporter. Now managing editor at CBC News
- Merella Fernandez - anchor/reporter (now with CTV News in Toronto)
- Kevin Frankish - Breakfast Television anchor/co-host (1991–2018), now teaches at Seneca College and produces special projects for City.
- Mary Garofalo (later at WNYW-TV in New York; now host of Global's 16x9 - The Bigger Picture)
- Anne-Marie Green - reporter (now at CBS News)
- Melissa Grelo - anchor/reporter (now co-host of CP24 Breakfast and weekday anchor at CP24)
- Peter Gross - sports director from 1977 until the early 1980s and then humour reporter with "The World According to Gross" until 1986. At 680 News from the early 1990s to 2019 except for a brief stint back at CityNews from 2001 to 2003 as a weather reporter and reprieving "The World According to Gross".
- Larysa Harapyn - entertainment anchor (laid off upon Rogers' elimination the CityNews' entertainment unit)
- Tom Hayes - reporter (now with Global News in Toronto)
- Kathryn Humphreys - sports anchor/reporter (1997–2015), now a stay at home mom
- Bob Hunter (founder of Greenpeace; later died after a prolonged battle with cancer on May 2, 2005)
- Andrew Krystal - general assignment reporter. Died 2022.
- Avi Lewis (1996–1998); (later with CBC Newsworld and then Al Jazeera English, now a documentary filmmaker and politician)
- Stephen Lewis - commentator (later appointed as Canadian ambassador to the United Nations)
- Amber MacArthur - new media specialist (now new media specialist for CP24)
- Gord Martineau - longtime former anchor in Toronto; 1977-2016 (now retired)
- Jim McKenny - sports reporter/anchor in Toronto; 1979-2009 (now retired)
- Tracy Moore - Breakfast Television/CityNews reporter (now host of Citytv's Cityline)
- Anne Mroczkowski - CityNews at Six anchor (laid off in January 2010 and later co-anchor of Global Ontario's News Hour); now media consultant and occasional actor
- Farah Nasser - weekend anchor/substitute anchor/reporter (now weekend anchor at Global National)
- David Onley - science and technology specialist/CP24 anchor and host of Homepage; 1984–2005; (Served as Lieutenant Governor of Ontario 2007–2014). Deceased 2023.
- Dini Petty (later host of CTV's The Dini Petty Show and guest host of Cityline 2010–2012)
- Alex Pierson - reporter; 1999-2006 (now a talk show host at Global News Radio 640 in Toronto)
- Beatrice Politi - CityNews/A-Channel/CP24 Ottawa-based political specialist (now with Global Ontario)
- Dina Pugliese - Breakfast Television co-host (2006–2023). Retired from broadcasting and focuses time on her beauty brand and family.
- Monita Rajpal, started as a reporter, then moved up to the anchor desk before moving to CNN International for 14 years; her last broadcast on CNN International was July 4, 2014.
- John Roberts (credited as J.D. Roberts) - entertainment reporter and weekend anchor (formerly co-host of CNN's American Morning; now with Fox News Channel as national correspondent in Atlanta)
- Ann Rohmer - CityNews anchor and host of Breakfast Television and CityOnline (now lead anchor at CP24)
- Tonya Rouse - CityNews/CP24 fitness specialist and host of CP24's Perfect Fit.
- Omar Sachedina - reporter (now with CTV News Channel)
- John Saunders - sportscaster (was with ESPN for 30 years) - deceased August 10, 2016
- Dick Smyth - commentator in the 70s and 80s, later news director at 680 News - deceased March 6, 2021
- Peter Silverman - consumer specialist and host of Silverman Helps segment (dismissed June 2008; later at CFRB, deceased October 7, 2021)
- Jennifer Valentyne - Breakfast Television Live Eye host; now with The Bachelorette Canada

=== Citytv Vancouver ===
- Fiona Forbes - Breakfast Television host (2002–2003; was at Shaw TV Vancouver)
- Beverley Mahood - host (2003–2005; now co-host of CMT Canada's flagship program, CMT Central)
- Simi Sara - Breakfast Television host (2005–2008; now at Global News Radio 980 CKNW)
- Jody Vance - Co-host/news anchor; Breakfast Television

=== Citytv Calgary ===
- Ross Hull - Breakfast Television reporter (now weather anchor at Global Toronto)

== See also ==
- Omni News
