= Hugh Burrill =

Canadian radio sports anchor

Hugh W. Burrill is a Canadian radio sports anchor. Hugh was born in Pembroke, Ontario and raised in Chalk River, Ontario.

== Career ==
Burrill began his career working for numerous radio stations for a few years. His first television gig was at Citytv Toronto, working as a writer for Breakfast Television. He was soon named the news producer and then he became an on-air personality as sports specialist for Breakfast Television and CityNews at Noon. He was then moved to CityNews at Six and CityNews Tonight Weekend Editions.

In 2007, Citytv's former parent, CHUM Limited was acquired by CTVglobemedia. At the same time, Burrill was hired by Rogers Media when the company acquired the Citytv stations including Toronto.

On January 19, 2010, as Rogers Media restructured its television operations, many Citytv staff members were laid off and several newscasts, including the weekend newscasts, were cancelled. Burrill became a sports reporter and substitute for Kathryn Humphreys as sports anchor. Weekend editions of CityNews returned in March 2011, and Burrill returned to his position of weekend sports anchor. Burrill then left the weekend news to focus on sports on their 24-hour news channel, CityNews Channel.

In 2016, Burrill joined consulting firm Fraser Torosay.

On February 8, 2017, it was announced that Burrill would be part of Sportsnet 590 The FAN's new morning show: Sportsnet's Starting Lineup with Brady & Price. The new show, which launched on February 27, 2017 features Elliott Price, Greg Brady and Burrill.

On June 21, 2021, Burrill announced that he would retire from broadcasting after June 25, 2021 to become Brand Ambassador for Golf Town, a sports retailer company.

== Personal life ==
He is an avid Montreal Canadiens fan.
