= CITY-DT =

Television station in Toronto

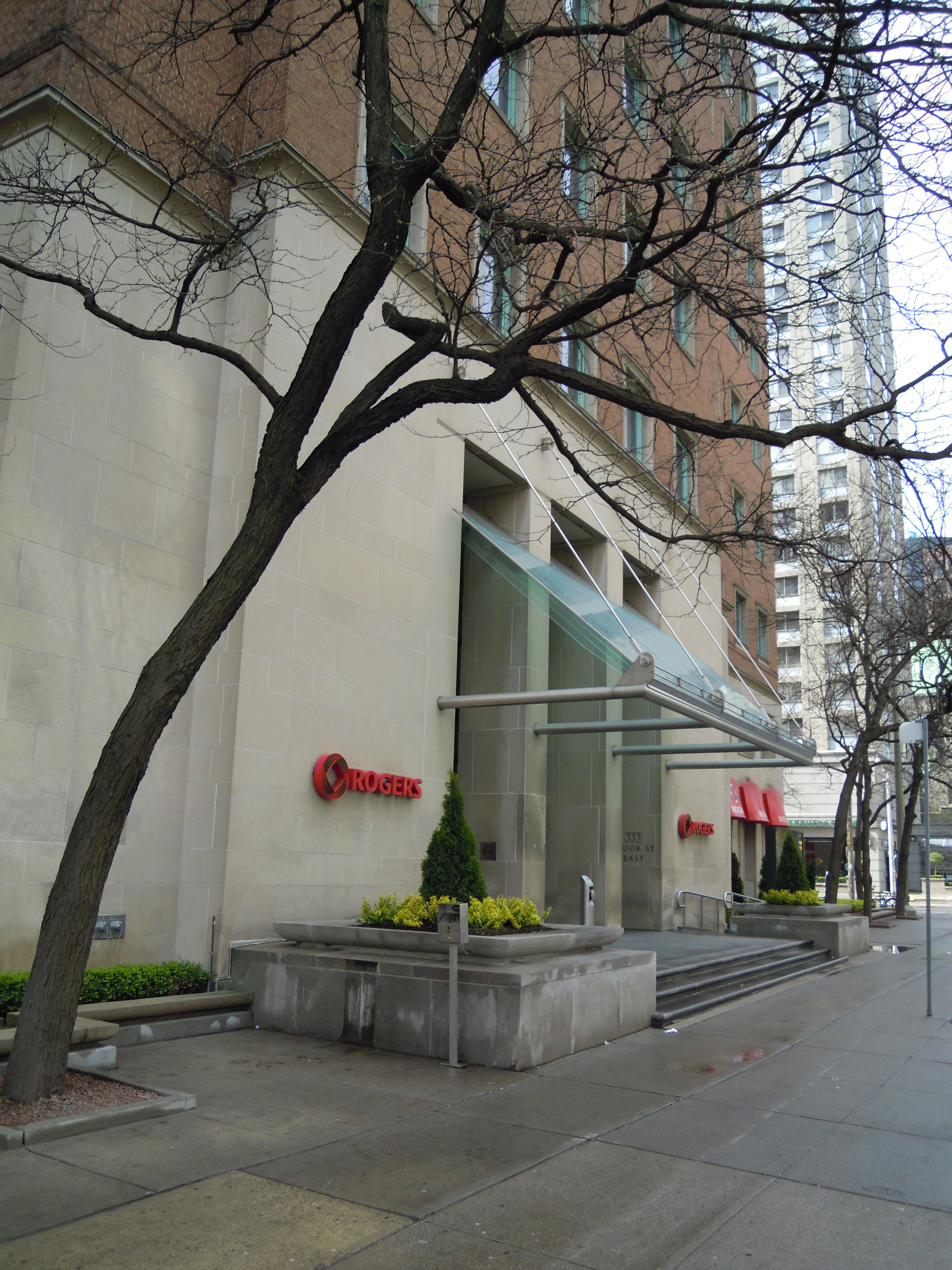
- The current CITY-DT studios are located on the Rogers Building in downtown Toronto since 2025
- Toronto, Ontario; Canada
- Channels: Digital: 18 (UHF); Virtual: 57
- Branding: Citytv Toronto; Citytv; CityNews Toronto (newscasts)

Programming
- Affiliations: 57.1: Citytv

Ownership
- Owner: Rogers Sports & Media; (Rogers Media Inc.)
- Sister stations: TV: CFMT-DT, CJMT-DT, Sportsnet Ontario; Radio: CFTR, CHFI-FM, CJCL, CKIS-FM

History
- First air date: September 28, 1972
- Former call signs: CITY-TV (1972–2011)
- Former channel numbers: Analog: 79 (UHF, 1972–1983), 57 (UHF, 1983–2011); Digital: 53 (UHF, 2003–2011), 44 (UHF, 2011–2020)
- Former affiliations: Independent (1972–2002)
- Call sign meaning: "City"

Technical information
- Licensing authority: CRTC
- ERP: 49.4 kW
- HAAT: 506 m (1,660 ft)
- Transmitter coordinates: 43°38′33″N 79°23′14″W
- Translator(s): see § Transmitters

Links
- Website: Citytv Toronto

CITY-DT (channel 57, cable channel 7), branded Citytv Toronto or simply Citytv, is a television station in Toronto, Ontario, Canada, serving as the flagship station of the Citytv network, a division of Rogers Sports & Media. It is sister to Omni Television outlets CFMT-DT (channel 47) and CJMT-DT (channel 40). The three stations share studios at the Rogers Building in downtown Toronto; CITY-DT's transmitter is located atop the CN Tower.

The station went on the air on September 28, 1972, by a consortium led by Phyllis Switzer, Moses Znaimer, Jerry Grafstein and Edgar Cowan, as CITY-TV, branded "Citytv" on Queen Street. In 1981, the station was sold to CHUM Limited, who retained Znaimer as an executive and moved to its 299 Queen Street West studios in 1987. For the majority of its early life, CITY-TV operated as an independent station, best known for its unconventional approaches to news and other locally produced programming. Under Znaimer's leadership, Citytv revolutionized Canadian local television by adopting a street-level, informal broadcasting style and creating interactive formats such as Speaker's Corner, which anticipated user-generated content platforms decades before the internet age. After having used syndication to bring its original programming to other Canadian markets, CHUM later used CITY-TV as the basis and flagship station of a television system, acquiring and establishing new stations under the Citytv name.

In 2006, CTVglobemedia announced its intent to acquire CHUM Limited, but was required to divest stations due to conflicts with CTV stations it already owned in Citytv's markets. CTV chose to keep the stations of CHUM's secondary A-Channel system, as well as CITY-TV's sister news channel CP24 and its other cable channels MuchMusic, but divested CITY-TV and its sister stations to Rogers Media. Under Rogers ownership, CITY-TV's programming became more conventional in nature.

== History ==
Former version of the Citytv logo, used from 1982 to 2001.

The station first signed on the air on September 28, 1972, broadcasting on UHF channel 79, an allocation given to the station as all of the VHF licences in the Toronto area were taken by other parties. It operated as an independent station, and its transmitter operated at an effective radiated power of 31 kW. The founding ownership group Channel Seventy-Nine Ltd. consisted of – among others – Phyllis Switzer, Moses Znaimer, Jerry Grafstein and Edgar Cowan. The four principal owners raised over $2 million to help start up the station, with Grafstein raising about 50% of the required funds, Znaimer raising around 25%, and the remainder being accrued by Switzer and Cowan. The channel 79 licence was granted to the company on November 25, 1971. The station operated from studio facilities located at 99 Queen Street East, near Church Street, at the former Electric Circus nightclub.

The station lost money early on, and was in debt by 1975. Multiple Access Ltd. (the owners of CFCF-TV in Montreal) purchased a 45% interest in the station, and sold its stake to CHUM Limited three years later. CITY was purchased outright by CHUM in 1981 with the sale of Moses Znaimer's interest in the station. Znaimer remained with the station as an executive until 2003, when he retired from his management role but continued to work with the station on some production projects.

In 1976, the station's main transmitter began broadcasting at 208 kW from the CN Tower. The station switched channel allocations on July 1, 1983, moving to UHF channel 57, the result of Industry Canada's decision to reassign frequencies corresponding to high-band UHF channels 70 to 83 to the new AMPS mobile phone systems as a result of a CCIR international convention in 1982. On September 1, 1986, a rebroadcast transmitter was put into operation in Woodstock (CITY-TV-2 on channel 31, which also served nearby London); another transmitter was set up in Ottawa in 1996 (CITY-TV-3 on channel 65).

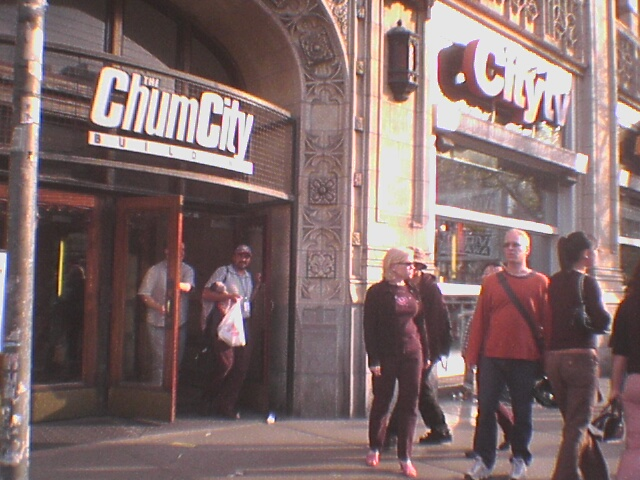
299 Queen Street West, home of Citytv Toronto until 2009

In May 1987, CITY and the other CHUM-owned television properties moved their operations to the company's headquarters at 299 Queen Street West, which became one of the most recognizable landmarks in the city. On March 30, 1998, CHUM launched CablePulse 24 (CP24), a local cable news channel whose programming used anchors from and featured reports filed by CITY-TV's news staff, rebroadcasts of the station's CityPulse newscasts and select programming from CITY and other CHUM stations.

Despite efforts to extend the brand to other major markets, for 30 years, CITY was the only Canadian station to identify on-air as "Citytv" – with "Citytv" and "CITY" serving as interchangeable names for the station. In July 2001, however, CHUM purchased CKVU-TV in Vancouver from Canwest Global Communications; CKVU changed its branding to "Citytv" in July 2002, making Citytv a two-station system. In 2005, three more Citytv stations were added in Calgary (CKAL-TV), Edmonton (CKEM-TV) and Winnipeg (CHMI-TV) after CHUM purchased the A-Channel television stations and other assets owned by Craig Media (the existing A-Channel brand was revamped and was transferred to CHUM's former NewNet stations). When the three A-Channel stations switched to the Citytv brand on August 2, 2005, the flagship CityPulse newscast was renamed CityNews.

=== Sale to Rogers Media ===
Logo used when the network was branded as "City"

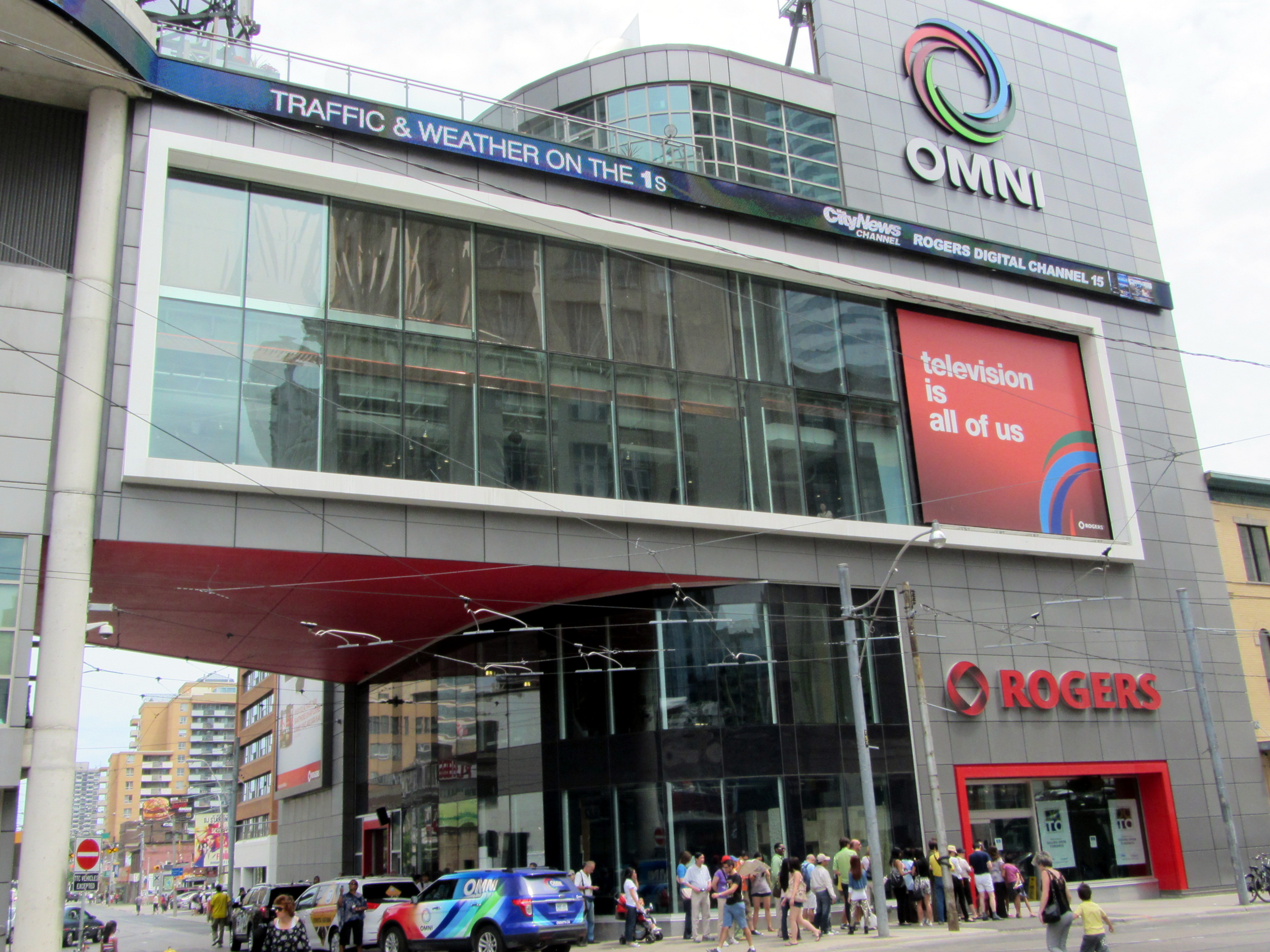
CITY-DT's studios at the Rogers Media Complex on 33 Dundas Street East facing Sankofa Square in Toronto, used from 2009 to 2025

On July 12, 2006, CTVglobemedia announced its offer to acquire CHUM Limited and its assets, including the Citytv stations, and related cable properties for $1.7 billion. Since CTV already owned television stations in all Citytv markets (including Toronto, where CTV owns and operates CFTO-TV, channel 9), the Canadian Radio-television and Telecommunications Commission (CRTC) stipulated the sale of the Citytv stations as a condition for the approval of the CHUM purchase. The Citytv stations (including CITY) were subsequently sold to Rogers Communications: the sale was approved by the CRTC on September 28, 2007, and Rogers took ownership on October 31. CTV kept ownership of 299 Queen Street West, where CHUM's specialty television channels now owned by CTV (such as CP24, MuchMusic, Star!, Bravo! and Space) would remain. As such, Rogers had to find a new home for CITY-TV's operations. Rogers subsequently purchased 33 Dundas Street East, the former Olympic Spirit building located at the edge of Sankofa Square, to house the operations of its Toronto television stations; CITY-TV moved into the new facility on September 8, 2009.

The Citytv system expanded into Western Canada in 2009 when the Jim Pattison Group signed a deal to carry the system's programming on its stations in Kamloops (CFJC-TV), Prince George (CKPG-TV) and Medicine Hat (CHAT-TV); Rogers signed a long-term affiliation renewal agreement for the Pattison stations in September 2012. Rogers gained two more outlets in a cable-only channel in Saskatchewan (Citytv Saskatchewan) and a station in Montreal (CJNT-DT) to broaden and expand its national coverage beginning in 2013, effectively transforming City from a television system to a television network.

On October 3, 2011, Rogers Media launched the CityNews Channel, a 24-hour regional news channel for the Toronto area utilizing the resources of CITY-DT's news department, and other Rogers-owned news and media properties such as all-news radio station CFTR (680 AM) and Maclean's magazine. The channel used the same news wheel format as CFTR with traffic and weather reports at the top and bottom of every hour, sports news at 15 and 45 minutes past the hour and business news at 26 and 56 minutes past the hour. In addition to rolling news programming, CityNews Channel aired simulcasts of Citytv Toronto's news programming, and an audio feed from CFTR during the overnight hours. Due to financial difficulties, Rogers ceased CityNews Channel's live broadcasts on May 30, 2013, with the channel permanently shutting down on June 30, 2013.

Citytv Toronto celebrated its 50th anniversary on September 28, 2022.

Citytv and Omni Television moved their operations to the Rogers Building at Bloor and Mount Pleasant in March 2025.

== Programming ==
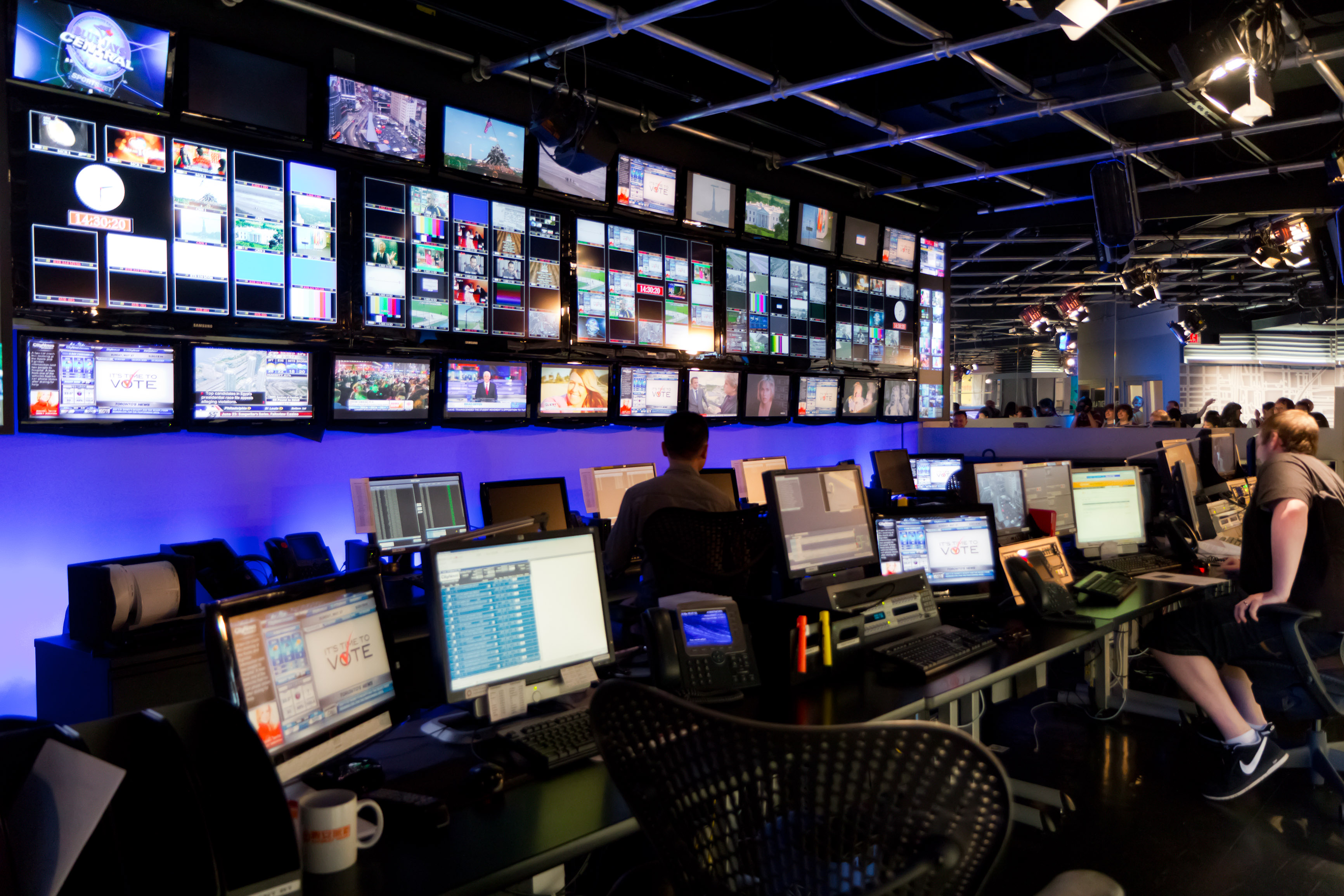
Citytv control room during Doors Open Toronto 2012

CITY-TV and the Citytv system/network has traditionally pursued a programming strategy targeting hip, young and urban audiences, and featured science fiction series (such as the Stargate and Star Trek franchises) with significant cult followings. The Citytv system has also sometimes aired more adult-oriented fare than most television stations, including the softcore film showcase The Baby Blue Movie and the television edition of Naked News, both of which were shown very late at night. CITY also aired The Oprah Winfrey Show from its debut in 1986 until the start of the 1992–93 season, when the show's broadcast rights were purchased by CTV and its local affiliate CFTO-TV, which aired the talk show until it ended its run in 2011. Shortly after its takeover by Rogers, Citytv's long-running Great Movies block was cancelled in favour of running more series. Late night reruns of the Great Movies block were replaced by infomercials.

The station has also produced much more local programming than most other Canadian television stations, including the daily talk show CityLine (hosted first by Dini Petty, then Marilyn Denis, and now Tracy Moore); magazine series such as The NewMusic, Toronto Rocks, FashionTelevision, Life on Venus Ave. and MovieTelevision; and interactive series such as Speakers' Corner. As well, the station often pursued synergies with its sister cable networks, sharing programming with MuchMusic, Bravo!, Space and CP24. The station also produced the Citytv New Year's Eve Bash, a live concert special from Nathan Phillips Square – although it still sponsored (and aired some coverage of) the event, it was replaced on-air with Dick Clark's New Year's Rockin' Eve in simulcast with ABC for 2013–14.

=== Sports programming ===
On March 2, 2008, CITY aired its first Toronto Blue Jays Major League Baseball game, a spring training game against the Cincinnati Reds (both Citytv and the Blue Jays are owned by Rogers Media). This is not the first time that a live sporting event has aired on a Citytv station, it also served as the Canadian broadcaster for Monday Night Football along with CBC until its American rights moved from ABC to ESPN, and in Canada to TSN, in 2006. Beginning with the 2007 NFL season as part of Rogers Media's broadcast rights with the NFL; two late season games were shown by CITY and Vancouver sister station CKVU-TV weekly, the opposite games aired regionally on their respective Sportsnet feed. In 2008, CITY aired the pre-season games of the Buffalo Bills, which included a game played at Rogers Centre as part of the Bills Toronto Series. From 2014 until 2017 (when this portion of the package was acquired by TSN and CTV Two), it also aired Thursday Night Football games in simulcast with CBS.

Under Sportsnet's television deal with the National Hockey League beginning in the 2014–15 NHL season, the station, along with the rest of the City network, airs a Saturday night game as part of the Hockey Night In Canada package. Toronto Maple Leafs games are typically designated to CBC Television and CBLT during Hockey Night, unless otherwise simulcast. Often, City broadcasts Montreal Canadiens games. In the inaugural season, City also broadcast the Sunday-night Rogers Hometown Hockey games, before they moved exclusively to Sportsnet.

The station simulcast games 3 and 5 of the 2019 NBA Finals featuring the Toronto Raptors. The simulcast was intended to enforce simsub rights on ABC affiliates, and hence used the NBA on ESPN telecast rather than the Sportsnet-produced telecast. CITY-TV was also one of the two original regional broadcasters (alongside then co-owned CKVR) of Raptors games during the team's first three seasons in the NBA from 1995 to 1998.

=== News operation ===
CITY-DT broadcasts 34 1/2 hours of locally produced newscasts each week (with 6 1/2 hours each weekday and two hours each on Saturdays and Sundays); in regards to the number of hours devoted to news programming, it is the largest local newscast output among the Greater Toronto Area market's television stations and the largest of any station in Ontario. It is also the only remaining owned-and-operated station of the Citytv network that operates a full-scale news department, as local midday and evening newscasts on its Winnipeg, Edmonton, Calgary and Vancouver sister stations were cancelled between 2006 and 2010; outside of Toronto, locally produced programming on Citytv's O&O sister stations is now limited to local versions of the morning news and talk program franchise Breakfast Television, a program that originated on CITY in September 1989. For many years, CITY aired its late evening newscast at 10 p.m. (as such, it was one of the few Canadian television stations to air a local news program during the final hour of prime time, a more common practice across the border in the United States); after Citytv became a television system and shifted its prime time schedule towards a line-up of primarily American programs, the station moved its late newscast to 11 p.m.

On January 19, 2010, Rogers Media announced the immediate cancellation of CityNews at Noon, CityOnline, CityNews at Five, Citytv's national and international newscast CityNews International, and the station's weekend evening newscasts, as part of massive restructuring and layoffs at the Citytv stations. Among those laid off were longtime 6 p.m. co-anchor Anne Mroczkowski and six reporters (Farah Nasser, Jee Yun Lee, Laura Di Battista, Marianne Dimain, Merella Fernandez and Michael Serapio); Pam Seatle was also dismissed, but returned to the station one month later.

The weekend 6 and 11 p.m. newscasts returned to the station in March 2011, followed by the return of the weekday CityNews at Five and the half-hour expansion of Breakfast Television (with its start time moved up to 5:30 a.m., and expanding to 3 1/2 hours as a result) on September 5, 2011. On October 3, 2011, the station began producing half-hour extensions of Breakfast Television and its nightly 11 p.m. newscast, CityNews Tonight, for exclusive broadcast on CityNews Channel (these, along with a half-hour extension of the weekend 6 p.m. newscast also began airing on CITY-DT the following year, and became exclusive to CITY-DT once CityNews Channel ceased operations).

On April 14, 2012, CITY-DT began simulcasting CityNews Channel's morning news programming from Saturdays from 7 to 8 a.m. and Sundays from 7 to 9 a.m., becoming the only television station in the Toronto market that carried news programs on weekend mornings; this ended when CityNews Channel discontinued live broadcasts in May 2013, with CITY-DT filling those time periods with a mix of infomercials and lifestyle programming. On August 13, 2012, the station expanded its nightly 11 p.m. newscast, CityNews Tonight, to one hour, making the program the only hour-long late evening newscast in the Toronto market. In September 2013, the weeknight 5 p.m. newscast was reformatted as The 5.

=== Notable current on-air staff ===
- Tim Bolen – weekday mornings on Breakfast Television
- Kevin Frankish – documentaries and special projects. formerly weekday mornings on Breakfast Television (last show June 1, 2018)
- Cynthia Mulligan – general assignment reporter
- Dina Pugliese – weekday mornings on Breakfast Television

==== Notable former on-air staff ====
- Thalia Assuras
- Dan Aykroyd – original staff announcer (1972–1973)
- Hugh Burrill – weekend sports anchor; also sports reporter
- Bill Cameron
- Lance Chilton – CityNews/CP24 reporter
- Jojo Chintoh – CityNews/CP24 reporter
- Denise Donlon
- Dwight Drummond – crime specialist
- Mark Dailey – CityNews Tonight anchor/continuity announcer
- Mary Garofalo
- Melissa Grelo – CityNews anchor/reporter
- Avery Haines – general assignment reporter
- Kathryn Humphreys – lead sports anchor; weeknights on CityNews Tonight
- Bob Hunter
- Andrew Krystal – former general assignment reporter
- Avi Lewis
- Stephen Lewis – commentator
- Brian Linehan – host of City Lights (1973–1988)
- Amber MacArthur – CityNews new media specialist
- Gord Martineau – weeknights anchor
- Jim McKenny
- Tracy Moore – Breakfast Television, Cityline and CityNews reporter
- Anne Mroczkowski
- Farah Nasser
- David Onley – CityNews science and technology specialist, CP24 anchor and host of Homepage
- Dini Petty – co-anchor of CityPulse and later host of CityLine
- Alex Pierson – general assignment reporter
- John Roberts (credited as J. D. Roberts) – 6 p.m. entertainment reporter/weekend anchor of CityPulse Tonight
- Ann Rohmer – Breakfast Television host, CityNews anchor and host of CityOnLine
- Omar Sachedina – general assignment reporter
- John Saunders – sportscaster (later with ESPN and ABC Sports)
- Peter Silverman – CityNews "Good Samaritan"
- Jennifer Valentyne – "Live Eye" reporter for Breakfast Television

== Technical information ==
=== Subchannel ===
Subchannel of CITY-DT
| Subchannel | Res. | Short name | Programming |
|---|---|---|---|
| 57.1 | 1080i | CITYTV | Citytv |

=== Analog-to-digital conversion ===
CITY-TV launched a test transmission of its digital signal using the ATSC DTV standard on January 16, 2003, and began regular digital transmission a month and a half later on March 3, becoming the first station in Canada to operate a digital television signal. CITY-TV shut down its analog signal, over UHF channel 57, on August 31, 2011, the date on which Canadian television stations in CRTC-designated mandatory markets transitioned from analog to digital broadcasts. The station's digital signal relocated from its pre-transition UHF channel 53 to its post-transition UHF channel 44, using virtual channel 57. It is now broadcasting on RF channel 18 while still using the same virtual channel.

=== Transmitters ===
| Station | City of licence | Channel (RF / VC) | ERP | HAAT | Transmitter coordinates |
|---|---|---|---|---|---|
| CITY-DT-2 | Woodstock | 31 (UHF); 31 | 20 kW | 293.0 m (961 ft) | 43°2′46″N 80°46′4″W |
| CITY-DT-3 | Ottawa | 17 (UHF); 65 | 5.1 kW | 215.4 m (707 ft) | 45°13′2″N 75°33′49″W |
