= Jess Grossman =

Canadian ostomy health advocate, entrepreneur, and actress

Jess Grossman (born 1989) is a Canadian ostomy health advocate, entrepreneur, and occasional actress. Based in Toronto, she is best known for founding the digital campaign Uncover Ostomy and for her work as founder and CEO of the marketing agency, In Social. Her public work focuses on raising awareness of ostomy surgery and reducing the stigma surrounding it. Her advocacy and public presence have been covered in People, Global News, CityNews Toronto, and Yahoo! Style Canada.

== Early life and education ==
Grossman was born and raised in Toronto, Ontario, Canada. At age eight she was diagnosed with Crohn's disease and, following severe complications, underwent ostomy surgery at age thirteen.

She later earned a master's degree in Graphic Communications Management and Technology from New York University. In 2013, she received the Bart Lawson Award for Service – Humanitarianism from the NYU School of Professional Studies for her advocacy work.

== Advocacy career ==
In 2009, Grossman founded Uncover Ostomy, a digital awareness campaign to document life with an ostomy bag and help others feel visible and empowered. The initiative combines candid photography, personal storytelling and public outreach.

Her advocacy work often includes visual campaigns showing her ostomy bag openly to promote acceptance and destigmatization. She has been featured in People, Global News, CityNews Toronto, and Yahoo! Style Canada, which profiled her work and its impact on public attitudes toward ostomy care.

Grossman has also spoken at public health and patient-advocacy events, including Let's Talk Ostomy – Keeping It Real! organized by Colorectal Cancer Canada.

In an interview published by the Canadian Journal of Surgery, she was described as a "digital marketer, actress, and model" advocating for openness about stomas and body image.

== Acting ==
Grossman has appeared in independent film productions. Her most substantiated role is in the feature film Belushi's Toilet (2018), in which she is credited as "Rachel" in independent film listings. The film has been reviewed in outlets such as UK Film Review.

She is also listed on IMDb as having appeared in the television docuseries A Time to Kill (2021), although independent verification of that casting has not been located.

In 2026, Grossman played Ava in Tristan Wheeler's film ''Toronto Apartment''. Her character is the former partner of Lock O'Hara, the film's central character. The film screened at the Mammoth Lakes Film Festival and later had its Canadian premiere in Toronto.

=== Selected filmography ===
Year	Title	Role	Notes
2018	Belushi's Toilet	Rachel	Feature film; confirmed via Moviefone.
2021	A Time to Kill	Corey Parker	Listed on IMDb; independent confirmation pending.
2026	Toronto Apartment	Ava	Listed on IMDb; independent dark comedy.

== Business and digital marketing career ==
Grossman is the founder and chief executive officer of In Social, a Toronto-based digital marketing agency offering services including social media strategy, advertising, website development, and content production.

According to PartnerStack, she founded the agency in 2015, and by 2022 it employed over twenty people working across marketing strategy, paid and organic social media, email automation, and influencer outreach.

Her role as founder and CEO has also been identified in industry interviews and talks.

== Personal life ==
Grossman's father, Jonathan Paul Grossman, was diagnosed with myelofibrosis in 2009, prompting a nationwide bone marrow donor campaign; he later received a transplant but died on 30 August 2009 from complications.

Grossman follows a vegan diet and has discussed how she manages it while living with an ostomy, offering dietary advice to other ostomates in interviews.

She contributed a first-person chapter, "The Reason I'm Alive", to Extraordinary Canadians: Stories from the Heart of Our Nation, edited by Peter Mansbridge and Mark Bulgutch (Simon & Schuster Canada, 2020).

Grossman was diagnosed with Rectal Cancer in November, 2025. After celebrating the ten year anniversary of her marketing agency, Grossman was experiencing pain and was advised by her doctor to go to the hospital. An emergency room doctor initially dismissed her pain, but she pushed for further testing which led to the cancer diagnosis.

== In scholarship ==
Uncover Ostomy has been analyzed in peer-reviewed research on online health communities and stigma. A New Media & Society article examined the platform and its Facebook community as a case study of how ostomy stigma is challenged and social support is fostered online. Subsequent research in Psychology & Health and other journals has cited Grossman and Uncover Ostomy when discussing body image, chronic illness, and online health communities.

== Impact and recognition ==
Grossman's advocacy has been credited with helping to shift perceptions of ostomy patients through open discussion and visual storytelling. Her campaigns have inspired others facing similar surgeries to speak publicly about their experiences and reduce stigma around ostomy care.
