= Dini Petty =

Canadian television and radio host (born 1945)

- Born: January 15, 1945 (age 81); Kingston upon Thames, Greater London, England, UK
- Occupations: Helicopter Pilot, TV & Radio Host, Author
- Writing career
- Genre: Children's Literature

Dini Petty (born January 15, 1945) is a British born-Canadian television and radio host. At 22, wearing a trademark pink jumpsuit and working for Toronto radio station CKEY, she became the first female traffic reporter to pilot her own helicopter. She clocked 5,000 hours as pilot-in-command of a Hughes 300.

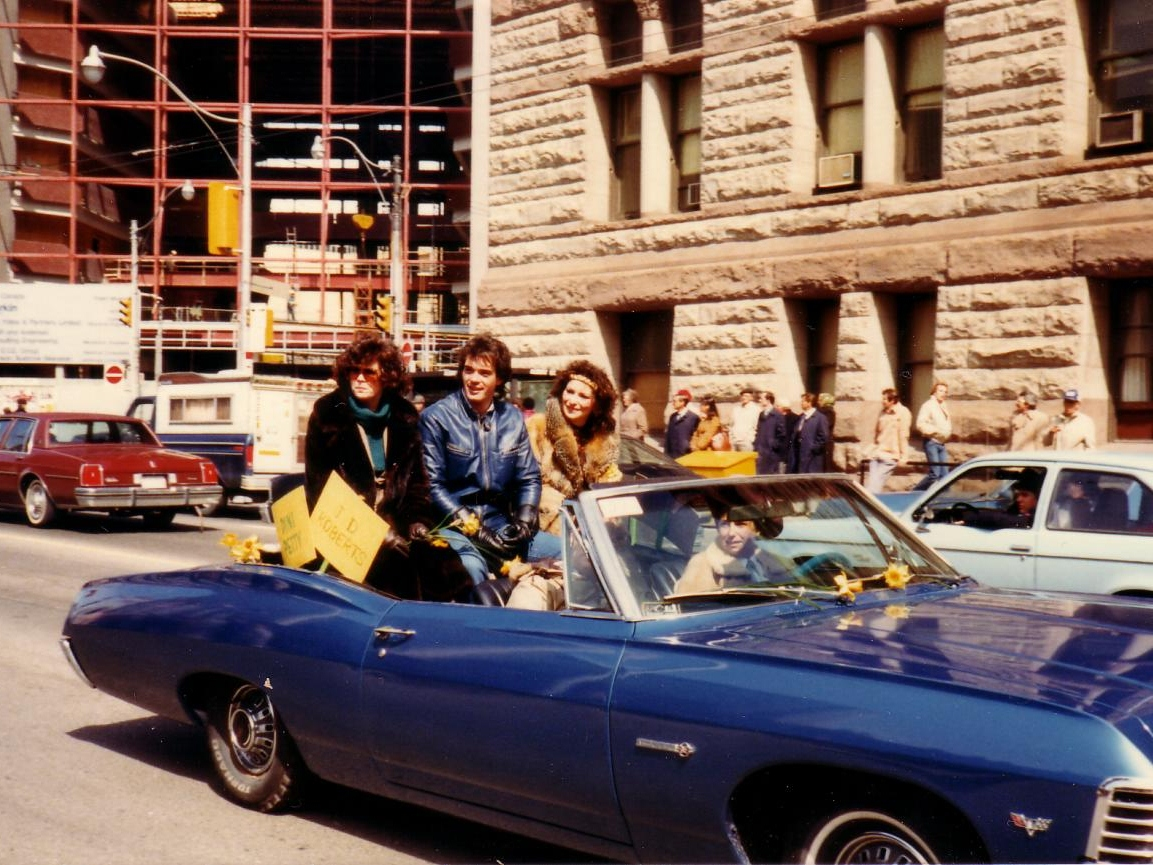
Petty, left, beside fellow Citytv personalities J. D. Roberts and Jeanne Beker at a parade in Toronto during March 1982.

Later, at Citytv Toronto, she worked as a writer, reporter and co-anchor, with Gord Martineau, of evening newscast CityPulse at 6. There she also hosted an afternoon program, Sweet City Woman. Later, on Citytv's daily talk show CityLine, Petty established herself as one of Canada's foremost television talk show hosts. She left her evening news anchor position to concentrate on CityLine. From May 1987 to 1989, Petty also anchored Citytv's short-lived 5:30 p.m. news and current affairs program CityWide.

In 1989, Petty moved to CFTO and the Baton Broadcasting System. Her popular hour-long general interest talk show, The Dini Petty Show, aired until 1999.

In the 2000s, Petty hosted Weekends with Dini Petty, a syndicated weekly radio program focused on health and wellness for baby boomers. Sheila Copps succeeded her as host of Weekends.

In August and September 2010, Petty returned to guest-host several episodes of Cityline while host, Tracy Moore, was on maternity leave.

In 2016, Petty relaunched a product called Luuup Litter Box, partially through using a Kickstarter platform.

== Personal life ==
Petty is the daughter of Gordon Petty, a film producer, and Molly, a Scottish war bride. Molly Petty ran a talent and modeling agency, Producers' Services in Toronto. In 1980, a documentary camera followed her pregnancy and the birth of her son Nicholas. She also has a daughter, Samantha.

== Publications ==
Petty has written a children's book, The Queen, the Bear, and the Bumblebee, published in 2000. Joanne Findon (professor of English literature at Trent University, Ontario) described the book as "a charming fable about the value of being yourself and recognizing your own strengths." Publishers Weekly was less flattering: "Despite a bumblebee protagonist, there's little to buzz about in this didactic picture book." In 2014, the book was staged at a theatre at the Banff Centre.
