= Vivian Kaye =

Ghanaian-Canadian entrepreneur

Vivian Kaye is a Ghanaian-Canadian entrepreneur, and owner of the hair extension brand KinkyCurlyYaki.

== Career ==
After graduating from a French immersion high school, Kaye began studying anthropology at York University, but dropped out following a bout of depression.

Kaye worked in a call centre, then moved to a technology start-up. From there, she began working at a company that supported entrepreneurs. As a side job, she became an entrepreneur, starting a wedding decor business. After sourcing her own hair weave, Kaye was complimented on her hair at an event, causing her to recognize the gap in the Black hair market. In December 2012, Kaye launched her business, and by the end of 2013, had done US$500,000 in sales. Four years later, sales had passed $1 million.

Vivian Kaye Consulting, Kaye's business consulting business, was launched in May 2018, and soon after, Kaye started participating in business coaching and mentorship during the COVID-19 pandemic, which interrupted supply chains. She is a peer mentor with Founders Fund, an online growth accelerator for female businesswomen. She also hosts an entrepreneurship podcast for American Express. After being a popular contributor to Canadian television program CityLine, she was given a five-week digital YouTube series for the show called Side Hustle + Bustle with Vivian Kaye, a "masterclass in entrepreneurship".

== Personal life ==
Kaye was born in Ghana and has three sisters. Her family moved to Canada when she was a baby. Kaye credits her entrepreneurial interests to her mother, who sold wares at markets in Ghana with Kaye strapped to her back.

She is a single mother to her son, Xavier, and is based in Hamilton.
