= The Dini Petty Show =

Canadian television talk show

- Also known as: The Dini Show
- Genre: talk show; interview
- Created by: Dini Petty
- Composer: Robert Rettberg
- Country of origin: Canada
- Original language: English
- No. of seasons: 10
- No. of episodes: ca. 1,000 (list of episodes)

Production
- Executive producers: Ted Stuebing; Susanne Boyce
- Production locations: 9 Channel Nine Court; Toronto, Ontario
- Running time: 60 minutes
- Production companies: BBS Productions Inc.; CFTO-TV Limited

Original release
- Network: CTV
- Release: September 11, 1989 – April 16, 1999

The Dini Petty Show is a Canadian daytime television talk show, which aired on stations affiliated with the Baton Broadcasting System from 1989 to 1999. It originated from the BBS flagship station, Toronto's CFTO-TV.

Hosted by Dini Petty, the program mixed lifestyle features and interviews with celebrity guests. Petty, a host and broadcaster based in Toronto, left the CITY-TV talk show CityLine to headline the show in 1989. Directed by Randy Gulliver, the show reflected popular culture in Canada in the 1990s, featuring interviews with celebrities, actors, authors, singers and performers, as well as politicians, policy advocates and local celebrities. The show underwent a re-development in late 1994. In 1999, Dini Petty agreed to only shoot "tops and tails" to introduce repackaged retrospective segments of previous episodes to be aired instead of new material.

== Seasons ==
The Dini Petty Show ran for 10 seasons between 1989 and 1999.

== Awards ==
The show was nominated for several Can Pro and Gemini Awards in 1992, 1997 and 1998.

== Notable episodes ==
The show received a NATPE (National Association of Television Program Executives) International Iris Award in 1992 for an hour-long interview with comedian Red Skelton. Petty also received a Can-Pro Award in 1997 for a one-hour interview with Sarah, Duchess of York.

== Reoccurring guests ==
Broadcaster Dan Duran was a frequent co-host on the show throughout the 1990s. There were regular contributors to show features, including decorator/publisher Lynda Colville-Reeves (of House & Home magazine), culinary expert Bonnie Stern, and editor-in-chief of Fashion Magazine John MacKay.

== Cancellation ==
Petty's contract with CTV ended in 2000, which led to a legal agreement resulting in Petty being awarded the original broadcast tapes to The Dini Petty Show. She donated the tapes to the Clara Thomas Archives & Special Collections at York University in 2010.
