= The Marilyn Denis Show =

Canadian television talk show

- Genre: Talk show
- Created by: Marilyn Denis
- Presented by: Marilyn Denis
- Country of origin: Canada
- Original language: English
- No. of seasons: 13

Production
- Executive producer: Michelle Crespi
- Camera setup: Multiple
- Running time: 60 minutes (with commercials)
- Production company: Bell Media Studios

Original release
- Network: CTV; CTV 2
- Release: January 10, 2011 – June 9, 2023

Related
- CityLine

The Marilyn Denis Show is a Canadian daytime television talk show which debuted on January 10, 2011, on CTV and CTV 2 (formerly A-Channel) until June 9, 2023. Hosted by Marilyn Denis, the show aired weekdays at 10 a.m. on CTV and 11 a.m. ET on CTV 2 (timeslots varied in other time zones). The show had a lifestyle-oriented format similar to Denis's previous Citytv talk show CityLine, but also regularly featured celebrity entertainment guests, which were not commonplace on the Citytv program.

== History ==
Denis had left CityLine in 2008 following the acquisition of all the assets of CHUM Limited by CTVglobemedia (Denis was primarily employed as morning co-host on CHUM-FM, which was retained by CTV, whilst her secondary employer Citytv was acquired by Rogers due to CRTC ownership regulations). The current program is produced in the same Toronto building (at 299 Queen Street West) in which CityLine was based during Denis's tenure, in the same studio as CityLine which was renovated specifically for the show.

On November 17, 2015, the show celebrated its 1,000th episode.

On April 13, 2023, Denis announced her decision to end the show after its 13th season, with the final episode slated to air June 9, 2023. The day before the show's final episode, CTV announced that Mary Berg will host a new lifestyle talk show, The Good Stuff with Mary Berg, in the 2023-24 television season.

The final episode featured a tribute video narrated by Denis's son Adam Wylde, surprise appearances by Andrea Martin and Eugene Levy, a farewell gathering of many of the guest experts who had been regular contributors to the program, and a musical performance by Glass Tiger of their 1980s pop classic "Don't Forget Me (When I'm Gone)".

=== The Best of The Marilyn Denis Show ===
A spin-off version of The Marilyn Denis Show also aired on the weekends, featuring a selection of Denis's favourite moments from the past week.

== On-air contributors ==
Home, Design & Garden Experts

- Debbie Travis
- Hilary Farr
- Candice Olson
- Drew Scott
- Jonathan Scott
- Owen Reeves
- Jane Lockhart
- Amanda Forrest
- Andrew Pike
- Aly Velji
- Cheryl Torrenueva
- Glen Peloso
- Kasia Waloszczyk
- Michelle Mawby
- Michael Penney
- Scott McGillivray
- Ramsin Khachi
- Katie Hunt

Family, Health & Lifestyles

- Alyson Schafer
- Ashley Howe
- Candice Batista
- Chantel Guertin
- Jill Dunn
- Joe Rich
- Julie Daniluk
- Miranda Malisani
- Mubina Jiwa
- Dr. Nancy Durand
- Natasha Turner
- Dr. Scott Gledhill
- Sebastien Centner
- Dr. Brett Belchetz
- Samantha Montpetit-Huynh
- Charles The Butler

Cooking Experts

- Mary Berg
- Allyson Bobbitt & Sarah Bell
- Michael Bonacini
- Lynn Crawford
- Christine Cushing
- Roger Mooking
- Anna Olson
- Suzanne Husseini

Entertaining Experts

- Sebastien Centner

Fashion Experts

- Alexis Honce
- Peter Papapetrou
- Natalie Sexton

Tech Experts

- Amber MacArthur

Finance Experts

- Kevin O'Leary
- Shannon Lee Simmons
