= John Derringer =

Canadian radio personality (born 1962)

- Born: John Hayes; September 21, 1962 (age 64)
- Education: St. Michael's College School
- Occupation: Radio personality
- Years active: 1979–2022
- Employers: CFTR; CHOM-FM; The Fan 590; Q107; Toronto Sun
- Known for: Host of Derringer In The Morning on Q107

John Derringer (né Hayes; September 21, 1962) is a former Canadian radio personality. Though he worked in several markets in the 1980s and 90s, he'is best known for his long association with CILQ-FM (Q107) in Toronto, Ontario, Canada, initially from 1984 to 1993, and again from 2000 until 2022.

Derringer lives in nearby Aurora. He hosted a weekday morning show, Derringer In The Morning, until it was suspended in May 2022. Throughout the early 2000s, Derringer's opinions also appeared in the form of a regular column in the Toronto Sun. As of 2016, Derringer has been named "Radio Personality of the Year" by Canadian Music Week 10 times, and has been named "Favourite Toronto Radio Personality" by the Sun, Eye Weekly, Now Magazine and Top Choice Awards.

In March 2012, Derringer received the Allan Waters Lifetime Achievement Award and was inducted into the Canadian Broadcast Industry Hall of Fame at Canadian Music Week in Toronto.

In 2012, he received the Queen Elizabeth Diamond Jubilee Medal for his work with the Canadian Centre for Abuse Awareness.

In May 2022, Derringer was suspended from Q107 pending an investigation after several former employees of the station, including Jennifer Valentyne, had accused him of misconduct and gender discrimination. He and the station agreed to "part ways" permanently in August 2022.

== Life and career ==
John Derringer was born John Hayes on September 21, 1962. He changed his surname to Derringer because his brother, Bill Hayes, was in the radio broadcast business and chose to have a different last name. While attending St. Michael's College School, Derringer started as an operator in 1979 at CFTR (AM) in Toronto. That was followed by on-air work at CKJD in Sarnia, CFGO in Ottawa, and K97 in Edmonton. He joined Q107 for the first time in 1984 and stayed until 1993. From 1993 to 1995, he was the morning host at CHOM-FM in Montreal, Quebec. He went on to host Jock and Roll, a 90-second segment which featured a pre-recorded interview with an athlete or a rock musician. Jock and Roll was syndicated to more than 20 radio stations throughout Canada. In 1995, he took over Bob McCown's morning show at Toronto's sports radio station The Fan 590. For almost 5 years he hosted the Fan morning show with Pat Marsden.

Derringer returned to CILQ-FM in 2000, replacing Howard Stern as the morning host. For a short time he supplemented his duties with an afternoon show for brother station CFMJ (Mojo Radio).

In 2005, Derringer was one of the interview subjects on Paul McCartney's "The Space Within Us" DVD.

== Philanthropy ==
As of December 2015, the "Derringer's 13 Days of Christmas" fundraising campaign has raised almost $9 million for The Martin Kruze Memorial Fund and the Canadian Centre For Abuse Awareness.

In 2004, Derringer launched an all-day fundraising drive to benefit the family of Louise Russo, a 45-year-old mother-of-three who was hit by a stray bullet while ordering a sandwich at a Toronto restaurant on April 21, 2003. The bullet shattered her spine, leaving her paralyzed. The station raised CDN$218,000 for the family.

Every year Derringer, a motorcycle enthusiast, leads "The B.A.D. Ride", a charity ride for the benefit of the Distress Centres of Toronto.

== Controversies ==
In 2003, Justice Richard Schneider of the Ontario Court of Justice filed a lawsuit against Derringer seeking $3 million in damages for libel. On the May 29, 2003 episode of Tool of the Day, Derringer criticized the judge's ruling in a child pornography case involving a 20-year-old man. Justice Schneider sentenced the man to 9 months' house arrest, with no jail time, a sentence Derringer declared too lenient. Derringer called Justice Schneider a "supposed Judge", and a "disgrace to our justice system."

He went on to say sterner penalties for child pornography would not come about until "a Justice like [Judge Schneider] is gonna have evidence brought into court in a case like that of Yong Jun Kim, and it's gonna be his kid being forced to perform fellatio on a man and sent around the world on the Internet". The Canadian Broadcast Standards Council (CBSC) ruled that Derringer "made improper personal attacks on the judge", and that "[the] Derringer commentary also sanctioned or promoted possible personal attacks on the children of the judge".

In response to the lawsuit and a complaint lodged with the CBSC by Justice Schneider's ex-wife, the radio station acknowledged Schneider's concerns while defending Derringer's actions as "without actual malice". In a letter to Schneider, CILQ-FM stated that "the Program, like many radio shows, can sometimes be controversial in nature and not for everyone's taste. However, many of Q107's core audience, which is mainly adults in the 25- to 54-year-old age group, in particular, men, find the program humorous." Derringer issued an on-air apology and, following the CBSC's ruling, the station was required to broadcast a series of announcements regarding the contentious statements.

Derringer was criticised for supporting the Ontario chapters of the Hells Angels in an August 31, 2005 column for the Toronto Sun. In it, he dismissed recent media reports about the Hell's Angels as "filled with innuendo, lies, half-truths and complete fabrications."

In May 2022, Derringer's former Q107 co-host Jennifer Valentyne posted a video on social media alleging that she had experienced years of verbal abuse and gender discrimination while working at the station. Although she did not identify Derringer by name in the video, she confirmed that she had filed a complaint with the Canadian Human Rights Commission against Corus Entertainment, naming Derringer in the complaint.

Following Valentyne's allegations, several former Corus employees also alleged that Derringer had engaged in abusive workplace behaviour and that Corus management had failed to address their complaints. Corus placed Derringer in the Morning on hiatus pending an external workplace investigation conducted by Turnpenney Milne LLP. On August 9, 2022, Corus announced that it had parted ways with Derringer, effective immediately.

Valentyne's complaint was subsequently referred to the Canadian Human Rights Tribunal as Valentyne v. Corus Entertainment Inc. Hearings began in Toronto in October 2025. Valentyne testified that Derringer had repeatedly subjected her to verbal abuse and gender-based discrimination during their time working together on Derringer in the Morning, and alleged that Corus management failed to respond adequately to her complaints.

Derringer testified before the tribunal in March 2026. He denied discriminating against Valentyne and disputed her account of their working relationship, alleging that she had behaved unprofessionally and had made disparaging remarks about colleagues. During cross-examination, Valentyne's lawyer challenged portions of Derringer's testimony.

As of August 2026, the tribunal had not released a decision and the proceedings remained ongoing.
