= Cynthia Mulligan =

Canadian television presenter

Cynthia Mulligan is a Canadian television presenter on CITY-TV's CityNews.

She was born in Montreal, Quebec, Canada and Mulligan studied English at McMaster University in Hamilton, Ontario. She started at Citytv in the CityPulse library. Before moving over to CityNews, she was a news writer for Breakfast Television. Mulligan has also been an ENG cameraperson and a videographer. She added the duties of anchoring CP24 in January 1998 until 2008 when CTVglobemedia acquired the channel.

As of 2025 Mulligan works as a reporter on CityNews at Five and CityNews at Six (weekdays) focusing on politics. She had been an education specialist/reporter in the 2008-2010 period. Her work was nominated for a Gemini Award for best local reporting. She won two Radio Television Digital News Association (RTDNA) awards: for her coverage of the 2015 terrorist attacks in Paris, and in 2017 for her series on Transgender Surgery in Bangkok. She also won The Edward R Murrow award for her 2010–2011 series "Kicking Cancer", a first-person account of what it is like to suddenly be diagnosed with cancer and the lengthy emotional process of treatment. In 2026, she received the Canadian Screen Award for best news anchor, local.

Mulligan has two daughters. In April 2010, she was diagnosed with breast cancer. She announced the diagnosis publicly in May 2010, and later reported on and blogged about her experiences of treatment. In 2018, she made an impact statement in court against ex-boyfriend Mike Bullard after he pleaded guilty to making harassing phone calls.

On 29 June 2021, Mulligan took to Twitter to announce that her cancer had returned. She was diagnosed with Stage 4 breast cancer around Christmas, 2020.
