= Leslie Roberts =

Canadian broadcaster (born 1962)

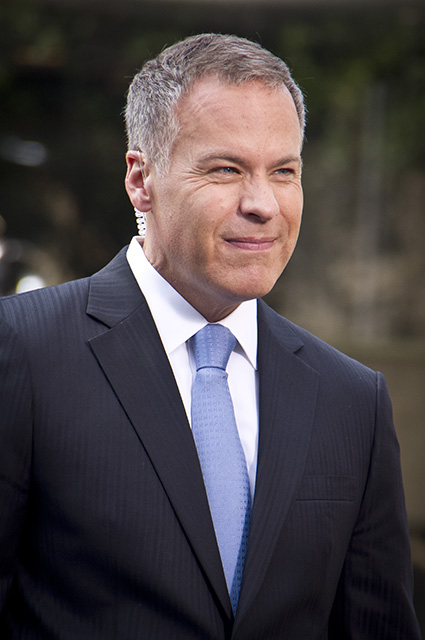

Montreal City Councillor for Peter-McGill Ward, Ville-Marie
- Incumbent
- Assumed office November 2, 2025
- Preceded by: Serge Sasseville

Personal details
- Born: June 28, 1962 (age 64) Montreal, Quebec
- Party: Ensemble Montréal
- Profession: Journalist, broadcaster

Leslie Roberts (born June 28, 1962) is a Canadian municipal politician, and has been a long-time television and radio personality. Prior to being elected, he was a freelance columnist for National Post and Montreal Gazette newspapers. Previously, he was the host of CTV Morning Live in Ottawa, and also hosted a mid-morning radio show on NewsTalk 580 CFRA, and host of The Leslie Roberts Show on CJAD in Montreal. From 2001 he was anchor and senior editor at Global Toronto and host of several programs on CFCF-TV (now CTV Montreal) from 1985 to 2000. He returned to Montreal in 2016 to host a talkshow on CJAD 800.

In the 2025 Montreal municipal election, Roberts stood for Montreal City Council as the Ensemble Montréal candidate in the downtown electoral district of Peter-McGill. He was elected with 56.7% of the vote.

== Family ==
Roberts was raised in a family of journalists. Roberts's great-grandfather John H. Roberts founded and ran a controversial reformist Montreal tabloid newspaper called The Axe between 1922 and 1924. His grandfather and namesake was a writer and journalist. His father, Bill Roberts, was a morning-man for Montreal's CJAD for 20 years, and later vice-president of programming. His mother was an assistant to a federal MP. Roberts's brother, Rob Roberts, is editor-in-chief at the National Post.

Roberts is the third generation of the Roberts family to work at CJAD 800 Montreal. His father Bill was morning man through the 1950s and '60s, and again for a few years in the '70s. His namesake grandfather Leslie was an editorialist at both CJAD, and Toronto sister station CFRB 1010, in the 1970s.

Roberts has one child, a daughter named Lauren Fernandez-Roberts. She is a reporter and weather presenter at CTV Montreal. Previously Lauren was a longtime producer at CTV's eTalk, and resigned in 2016. In January 2020, Lauren was director of the PK Subban Foundation (a charity started by former Montreal Canadiens defenseman PK Subban), which raises money for the Montreal Children’s Hospital. Joining CTV as an on-air presenter makes her the 4th generation of the Roberts media family on TV & radio in Montreal.

In October 2019, Roberts publicly came out as gay to mark National Coming Out Day.

== Career ==
At 18, Roberts interned in the newsroom at Montreal's CKGM radio, specifically covering the 1980 Quebec referendum and having the opportunity to interview René Lévesque. After finishing school, he was immediately recruited in 1985 as a medical reporter for CFCF-TV, the CTV affiliate in Montreal. At CFCF-TV for twelve years, Roberts found himself hosting a variety of different programs, from travel to morning talk shows. He co-hosted Travel, Travel with Don McGowan.

In 1995, a tape of an interview he conducted on his morning TV show Montreal Today With Leslie Roberts landed on the desk of an agent in Los Angeles. Within six months he was offered a position with the TV tabloid show A Current Affair. A year later he moved to Fox as a reporter/anchor for WNYW in New York City. Three years later Roberts answered a call from CFCF-TV to return home as anchor/host of several shows. In 2000, the Global Television Network came calling. He was news director and senior anchor at Global Quebec until Global offered a position on the anchor desk in Toronto.

Roberts was the executive editor and anchor for Global Toronto from 2001 to 2015, hosting the station's News Hour from 5:30-6:30 p.m., and co-anchoring Global and Shaw Media's The Morning Show from 2013 until 2015.

During those years he also hosted his own radio talk show on CFRB in Toronto, was a daily contributor to talk station AM 640 Toronto, and penned a column, "The Five Things I Learned This Week" in the National Post.

In 2011 and 2013 he was nominated for the Gemini Award/Canadian Screen Awards for Canada's Best News Anchor. Roberts won two CSA's while hosting Focus Ontario.

=== Global News ===
In September 2001, Roberts was recruited by CanWest's Toronto division to be a co-anchor with Beverly Thomson of the station's supper time news show. Roberts arrived just a week before the terrorist attacks of September 11, 2001. The news team included meteorologist Michael Kuss and sports director Jim Tatti. From June 2010 until August 2013, his co-anchor was former CITY-TV anchor Anne Mroczkowski, who replaced Anne-Marie Mediwake after she moved to CBC News. Roberts was the show's sole anchor from August 2013 until his resignation. He also hosted Global Ontario's 11 pm news broadcast for several years. As well as Focus Ontario, the country's longest running political show, which he co-hosted with former Ontario Progressive Conservative leader and later Mayor of Toronto, John Tory.

In 2013, Roberts became the co-host with Liza Fromer on the national edition of Global and Shaw Media's The Morning Show in addition to his News Hour duties.

On January 8, 2015, Global Television announced that they had suspended Roberts indefinitely pending the company's investigation of alleged conflict of interest following a Toronto Star report that revealed Roberts had equity in a public relations firm, clients of which had appeared on his programs, and for whom he had rendered communications consulting, without disclosure to colleagues or viewers.

Roberts resigned from Global News a week later. He issued a statement that read: "I am resigning my position as News Anchor and Executive Editor of Global Toronto effective immediately. I regret the circumstances, specifically a failure to disclose information, which led to this outcome. Over the past 15 years, I have worked within a news organization and among colleagues who are the best in the business. For that privilege, I will always be grateful." Global News issued a memo to its staff stating that: "Leslie Roberts has resigned, effective immediately, from his position as Anchor and Executive Editor of Global Toronto, and co-host of The National Morning Show. In light of the findings of an internal investigation, conducted on the basis of our Business Conduct Standards and the Global News Journalistic Principles and Practices, Global News is satisfied with today’s outcome."

=== Recent years ===
After leaving Global in January 2015, he was a freelance broadcaster and communications specialist, working with technology firms, based in Los Angeles. In 2016, he reported for radio stations CJAD Montreal, and CFRA Ottawa, covering the arrest of a man found with weapons on his way to the LA pride parade, just hours after the worst mass shooting in U.S. history in Orlando, Florida.

In December 2016, he returned to his hometown of Montreal with his own show, airing weekdays from 9 a.m. to noon on CJAD. He replaced longtime CJAD personality Tommy Schnurmacher, who began semi-retirement and then hosted the one-hour "Gang of Four" weekdays at noon for a time.

He left CJAD in 2019, moving to Bell Media in Ottawa where he hosted CTV Ottawa's edition of CTV Morning Live as well as a morning radio show, Ottawa at Work with Leslie Roberts on sister station CFRA.

In June 2022, he told his audience he was leaving CTV and CFRA, thanking Ottawa viewers and listeners for his “three great years in the capital.”

Returning to Montreal, he worked as a freelance columnist for the National Post and Montreal Gazette until announcing his candidacy for Montreal City Council in September 2025.
