= Farah Nasser =

Canadian journalist

Farah Nasser is a Canadian journalist. She has anchored for Citytv (2007–2010), CP24, and Global News (2015 to 2024).

== Career ==
Nasser was born and raised in Mississauga, Ontario, Canada, and moved to Toronto to work as a journalist at Newstalk 1010 (1999–2003), Toronto 1 (2003–2005) before joining /A\ Channel News in Barrie (2005–2007).

In 2001, at the age of 20, she landed a summer job with CNN in New Delhi, India. She was then a second-year radio and television student at (then) Ryerson Polytechnic University. She also studied European Media Studies at University of Westminster in London.

She anchored Citytv Toronto's CityNews weekend editions at 6 p.m. and 11 p.m. with Roger Petersen from 2007 until she was laid off on January 19, 2010. CITY-TV announced cuts to several news programs and staff. The weekend news was cancelled, and Nasser was part of a company-wide layoff that affected 6% of CITY's staff, and several on-air presenters. She was a reporter and anchor with CablePulse24 in Toronto in 2010. In May 2015, she was named by Shaw Media as the co-anchor of Global Toronto's 5:30pm and 6pm newscast, alongside Alan Carter.

In June 2022, Global News announced that Nasser would be moving from Global Toronto to join Global National, as weekend anchor.

In June 2024, Nasser announced on Global National she is moving on from the network.
