= Bill Cameron (journalist) =

Canadian journalist, broadcaster, and author

William Lorne Cameron (January 23, 1943 – March 12, 2005) was a Canadian journalist, broadcaster, and author.

Cameron was born in Vancouver, British Columbia, Canada and grew up in Vancouver, La Jolla, California, and Ottawa, Ontario.

A Gemini Award and National Magazine Award winner, he was a writer, author, documentary reporter/producer, TV current affairs host/interviewer, radio broadcaster, newspaper columnist and reporter and TV news anchor.

== Early career ==
In 1965, Cameron abandoned his studies in English literature at the University of Toronto to pursue an acting career in New York where he began freelancing for CBC Radio as an arts and entertainment critic/reviewer. He returned to Toronto and a new job at the Toronto Star as a columnist and member of the editorial board when he was 25 years of age. In 1970, Cameron was part of a group of young researchers with Senator David Croll's Senate Committee studying poverty in Canada. The four resigned from their jobs, disenchanted with the direction of Croll's committee, and wrote, "The Real Poverty Report." Cameron moved to Maclean's Magazine where he was a writer and associate editor.

== Television ==
In 1974, Cameron was hired by the fledgling national network Global as writer, reporter and eventually host of the programme Newsweek. In 1978, Moses Znaimer, president of Toronto's CITY-TV, hired him to anchor the hour-long newscast, CityPulse which aired weeknights at 10 p.m. Cameron left CITY in September, 1983, when talks for his next contract collapsed over issues of salary and style. He was hired almost immediately by Mark Starowicz, then executive-producer of the CBC daily current affairs program The Journal. Cameron split his duties between on-air hosting and documentary reporting and remained with The Journal until its demise in 1992. During this period, he also periodically hosted Midday, CBC's national noon-hour talk show. Cameron then anchored the local television supper hour program, CBC Evening News, which in 1995, won a Gemini award as Best Local News Program. In 1995, Cameron was hired by CBC Newsworld to front the news network's national morning program, CBC Morning, based in Halifax, where he worked until September 1998. Back in Toronto, he anchored Sunday Report, CBC's National weekend news program, while hosting his own current affairs program on Newsworld during the week. In 1999, Cameron left the CBC for good when contract talks collapsed, acting briefly as the communications vice-president for an online financial marketing firm before returning to journalism from 2000 until late in 2001 as a reporter and columnist for National Post. For a while in the early 2000s, Cameron hosted an interview show in ichannel. During this time, he was awarded the chair in journalistic ethics at Ryerson University's School of Journalism, and taught at Ryerson and its Chang School of Continuing Education. Throughout this time, Cameron was an occasional substitute host on CBC Radio's Sunday Morning, on CBC Radio's flagship daily current affairs program As It Happens, and on Morningside, CBC's daily radio current affairs program.

== Other work ==
In 2003, he released a novel Cat's Crossing, published by Random House of Canada. His second novel was nearly finished at the time of his death and was never published. He also had a cameo role on the comedy channel series Puppets Who Kill as the newsreader reporting on the latest criminal activities of the show's homicidal puppets, who were cohabitants of a halfway house. In 1980, Cameron's semi-autobiographical play about his teenage years, entitled "The Ramble Show" was staged in Toronto as part of Equity Showcase.

== Personal life ==
Cameron was married to Cheryl Hawkes, at the time a freelance journalist who was formerly with the Canadian Press, Reuters, CTV, Maclean's Magazine and CBC TV News. They met when she was writing a profile of him for Starweek, the Toronto Star's television guide.

The couple worked together briefly in the 1990s when Cameron anchored The CBC Evening News, where his wife already worked as a writer/producer and on-air reporter. The couple had three children - Patrick (1982), Rachel (1984) and Nicholas (1989-2018). Cameron also had a son, Sean Patenaude (1967). Nicholas was killed in an automobile accident in 2018 while a passenger in an Uber.

Bill Cameron died of esophageal adenocarcinoma/esophageal cancer on March 12, 2005, after a nine-month battle.

In his last piece of journalism, "Chasing the Crab", Cameron documented his battle with cancer. The essay appeared in the May 2005 issue of The Walrus and won two gold medals at the 2006 Canadian National Magazine Awards in the health and personal journalism categories.

== Legacy ==
Immediately after his death, Cameron's widow with the assistance of the Toronto General and Western Hospital Foundation, set up the Bill Cameron Fund to raise money for esophageal cancer research and patient care.

On May 31, 2006, the City of Toronto, again on Cheryl Hawkes' initiative, approved Esophageal Cancer Awareness Day.

On December 3, 2007, a laneway near the Cameron home in the Dovercourt Road/Bloor Street area of Toronto was officially named Bill Cameron Lane in his honour.

In 2013, the University Health Network opened a patient consultation room in the endoscopy ward of the Toronto General Hospital with monies from the Bill Cameron Fund so that patients could consult with physicians or be alone in situations in which privacy is a consideration.
