= CityLine =

Canadian television program

- Genre: Talk show
- Presented by: Dini Petty (1984–1989); Marilyn Denis (1989–2008); Tracy Moore (2008–2024)
- Country of origin: Canada
- Original language: English
- No. of seasons: 40

Production
- Executive producers: Moses Znaimer; Sandy Chronopoulos
- Production locations: Toronto, Ontario
- Camera setup: Multiple
- Running time: 60 minutes (with commercials)
- Production companies: CHUM Television (1984–2007); CTVglobemedia (2007); Rogers Media (2007–2024)

Original release
- Network: Citytv (1984–2024); NewNet/A-Channel (1995–2008)
- Release: February 20, 1984 – May 3, 2024

Related
- The Marilyn Denis Show

CityLine is a Canadian talk show and lifestyle television program originally hosted by Dini Petty, who was then succeeded by Marilyn Denis and later Tracy Moore that aired from February 1984 until May 3, 2024, produced for the Citytv network at its Toronto flagship station CITY-DT. It also aired on its then-sister stations owned by CHUM Limited such as CKVR Barrie.

Each show had a theme that changed daily. These included "Around the House", "Family Day", "Home Day", and "Fashion Friday". It was Canada's longest running daytime show specifically targeted to women. The show also aired in the United States on the Dabl digital multicast network and was syndicated on local television stations.

== History ==
CityLine debuted in February 1984, originally hosted by Dini Petty. It replaced City Life hosted by Deborah Burgess in 1983, which itself was a revamped version of CITY's the long running lifestyle show, You're Beautiful with Micki Moore.

After Petty left for CTV, CityLine was hosted by Marilyn Denis from September 1989 to May 23, 2008. Subsequent to Denis's departure to host The Marilyn Denis Show for CTV, a series of guest hosts were used, including Jessica Holmes, Jennifer Valentyne, Jody Vance, Liz West, Dina Pugliese, Christine Cardoso, Tracy Moore, Catherine Marion and Nalini Sharma. Moore was named the new permanent host in 2008.

Prior to fall 2008, Cityline was aired live. However, from 2008 to 2024 Cityline was taped in advance and then aired two weeks from the date it was recorded.

In 2024, Rogers announced the cancellation of CityLine; the show's final episode aired on May 3. It was announced that the show would be replaced by a new lifestyle-oriented hour of Breakfast Television hosted by Moore. It was later announced that former ET Canada host Cheryl Hickey would co-host the new hour—BT with Tracy and Cheryl. The program was originally slated to premiere in September 2024, but was delayed; the network subsequently announced in January 2025 that the new program would not proceed.

== Personalities ==
In addition to host Tracy Moore, Cityline revolved around regular lifestyle experts from chefs, to design, to decor, including:

- Massimo Capra
- Christian Dare
- Randy Feltis
- Frank Ferragine
- Mairlyn Smith
- Brian Gluckstein
- Leigh Ann Allaire Perrault
- Shoana Jensen
- Janice Meredith
- Devan Rajkumar
- Bill Rowley
- Karen Sealy

== Toronto's Next Top Model ==
Toronto's Next Top Model was broadcast as a segment on Cityline's Fashion Fridays in May 2005. Ten aspiring models were selected from over 1,000 applicants and judged on live television. To promote the connection to America's Next Top Model, Cityline invited ANTM stylist Jay Manuel as a guest on the final episode.

The winner was decided by three high-profile fashion industry professionals, and influenced by an online vote open to the Canadian public. The judges were Elmer Olsen, head of Elmer Olsen Models, Ceri Marsh, editor of Fashion magazine, and Lisa Rogers, one of Canada's first top international models and now a consultant on Cityline.

The winner, Lisa Caroline Leung, of Toronto, walked away with a modeling contract from Elmer Olsen Models, the chance to model on Cityline, a fashion shoot with fashion photographer Gabor Jurina and a spread in the 2005 summer issue of Fashion magazine. Leung was the first multiracial person to ever win any of the Top Model competitions or competition spin-offs.
