= Lance Chilton =

Lance Chilton is a former Canadian television journalist.

He began his career at Citytv in Toronto in 1987, as an entertainment reporter for CityPulse News. He briefly hosted Toronto Rocks before joining MuchMusic as a reporter and anchor for FAX in 1990. He remained with that program until 1998, when he moved to The New VR (now CTV two: Barrie/Toronto) in Barrie to anchor the station's newscasts. In 1991, Chilton co-produced and hosted "Internet and Interactive with Bill Gates" a live one-hour special on MuchMusic with the Microsoft founder that explored the beginnings of the internet as a public tool. In the summer of 2010, Chilton left "A" News, to start a new career in real estate. He anchored his last newscast on June 15, 2010.
