= Kathryn Humphreys =

Canadian sports anchor

- Born: 19 September 1970 (age 56); Oshawa, Ontario, Canada
- Spouse: Divorced
- Children: 2
- Presenting career
- Show: CityNews at Six; CityNews Tonight
- Station: CITY-DT
- Country: Canada

Kathryn Humphreys (born 19 September 1970) is a Canadian former sports anchor for CityNews at Five, CityNews at Six and CityNews Tonight. She was previously with CityNews Weekend which she joined in March 1997.

Born in Oshawa, Ontario, Humphreys worked as an intern at 680 News in the sports department in Toronto and WBZ-TV in Boston. She moved to the Muskoka area to work at The Moose 100.9 FM in Bracebridge, reporting news, sports and weather.

As the daughter of the Oshawa Generals owner John Humphreys, she had plenty of exposure to sports. She has played basketball, volleyball and football while sitting on Victoria College's Athletic Executive Board during university. She was married to former Tragically Hip drummer Johnny Fay until September 2016.

She earned an English degree, honours degree, and a minor in history from the University of Toronto.

The broadcaster confirmed her departure from Citytv in November 2007 after failing to resolve a new contract with station management. However, the contract dispute was resolved, and on 10 December 2007, she re-assumed her position as a CityNews sportscaster. She also appeared on Rogers Sportsnet and The Fan 590.

On 25 August 2009, Humphreys was nominated for a Gemini Award in the category of "Best Host or Interviewer in a Sports Program or Broadcast".

Humphreys announced on 27 May 2015 that she was leaving CityNews after eighteen years with the station in order to spend more time with her twin boys who had been born the previous year.
