= Kevin Frankish =

Canadian television presenter and media personality

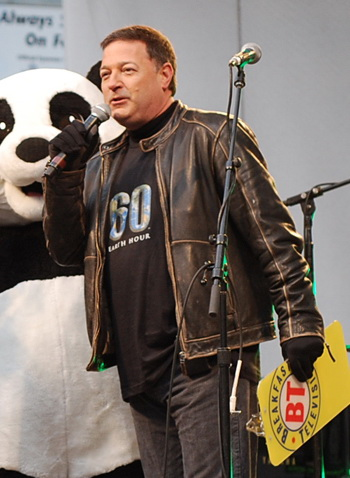
- Frankish in March 2010
- Born: Kevin Frankish

Kevin Earl Frankish is a Canadian television presenter and media personality. He co-hosted Breakfast Television Toronto on Citytv Toronto from 1991 to 2018 and now teaches journalism at Seneca College.

== Biography ==
Frankish was born to Allan and Vivianne Frankish at The Royal Columbian Hospital in New Westminster, British Columbia. He grew up in North Bay, Ontario and attended St. Joseph-Scollard Hall Catholic Secondary School. In 1981 he got a part-time job with CKNY-CHNB TV in North Bay as a weekend camera and reporter. He attended Canadore College and received a diploma in radio and television broadcasting. In 1983, he joined the staff at CKVR-TV in Barrie, Ontario. At CKVR, he began a practice of ending every broadcast with a wink, his way of saying "hi" to his wife Beth (married in 1988). He continued signing-off with a wink for the entirety of his career.

In 1991, Frankish joined Citytv (then CKVR's sister-station) as the traffic reporter and eventually became one of the main hosts of Breakfast Television Toronto (alongside Dina Pugliese). For many years, he also handled the overnight CityPulse updates, anchoring them directly from the assignment desk, even controlling the camera himself. After suffering a panic attack on the air in 2006, Frankish publicly discussed his panic attacks and struggle with depression with viewers and has since become a very active advocate for mental health issues.

In 2012 Frankish was awarded the Queen's Jubilee Medal for his community service, particularly with Easter Seals, an organization he has worked with for 40 years.

In 2018 parent company Rogers Communications suddenly terminated his employment with Citytv. Frankish announced he was leaving Breakfast Television Toronto, effective June 1, 2018. In his announcement he mentioned, "Many of you who started watching me as kids, come up to me now with kids of your own. Some of you may remember when I proposed to my wife on air. I have shared with you the birth of all four of my children. When I had that panic attack on air, I shared that with you and we have since gone on a journey of my battle with depression together. Many of you in turn have shared so many of your stories. We are truly family." He continues to work in media as a public speaker, content creator and is a journalism professor at Seneca College at York University. He runs Kevin Frankish Media, a media content and creation company and has a YouTube channel. He is also on the board of directors of St. John Ambulance Ontario Division, still hosts the annual Easter Seals Telethon on CBC TV and works with several organizations helping those with mental health issues and homelessness.

Frankish hosted an afternoon show on 105.9-The Region with another former CityTV personality, Ann Rohmer. He has left broadcast radio and now works to advocate mental health.

In 2025 he joined CFIQ as interim host of Toronto Today during a leave of absence by regular host Greg Brady.

== Personal life ==
In March 2018 Frankish and his wife Beth decided on an amicable separation. He now lives in Toronto. During their 30 years of marriage they had four children. Frankish's father died in 2015. His 90-year-old mother still lives in his adopted hometown of North Bay.
