= CityNews Channel =

Canadian television channel

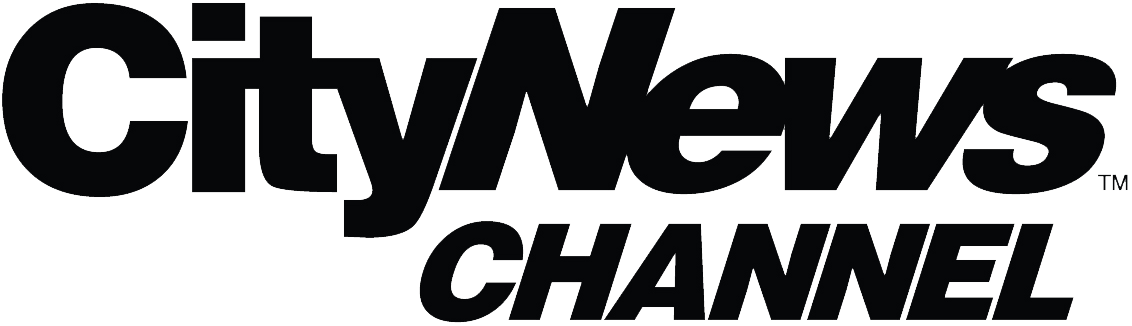
- CityNews Channel logo
- Country: Canada
- Broadcast area: Ontario
- Headquarters: Toronto, Ontario

Programming
- Language(s): English
- Picture format: 1080i (HDTV); 480i (SDTV)

Ownership
- Owner: Rogers Media
- Sister channels: CITY-DT, CFMT-DT, CJMT-DT, CFTR

History
- Launched: October 3, 2011
- Closed: May 30, 2013 (end of live broadcasts); June 30, 2013 (full closure)

CityNews Channel was a Canadian English language specialty digital cable television channel from 2011 to 2013. It was owned by the Rogers Media division of Rogers Communications, and primarily focused on the Greater Toronto Area (GTA). The channel was only available in Ontario and broadcast a single feed in high definition which was also accessible through standard definition televisions.

The channel's branding was shared with its Rogers-owned conventional television network, City (formerly Citytv), and its news brand CityNews. The channel broadcast from 33 Dundas Street East in Downtown Toronto which also houses studios for City flagship CITY-DT, and Omni Television flagships CFMT-DT (channel 47) and CJMT-DT (channel 40).

== Format ==
CityNews Channel broadcast an all-news format, consisting of local, national and international news. It operated a 24-hour news wheel as seen on-screen, with traffic and weather reports every 10 minutes on the :1s, sports news at :15 and :45 past the hour, and business news (under the title CityBiz) at :26 and :56 past the hour, a similar format used on Rogers-owned all-news radio station in Toronto, CFTR (680 AM; known by its brand "680 News"), and two of CITY-DT's local newscasts, CityNews at Five and Breakfast Television.

The channel's anchors were rotated depending on time period. Live rolling news programming is from 9 a.m.-5 p.m. weekdays, 7 a.m.-6 p.m. weekends, and 7-11 p.m. every night.

The station also aired simulcasts of all CITY-DT-produced local programming. Encore broadcasts of CityNews at Six were seen on CityNews Channel at 7 p.m. while the 11 p.m. newscast, CityNews Tonight was repeated on CityNews Channel at midnight. During the overnight hours when CityNews Channel did not broadcast live programming or CITY news broadcasts, from 1 a.m. (originally midnight until September 2012) to 5:30 a.m. weekdays and midnight to 7 a.m. ET weekends, it aired an audio simulcast of 680 News and live traffic camera feeds from the Toronto area. Conversely, CityNews Channel had aired simulcasts of its weekend morning news programming on CITY-DT from April 14, 2012 until the channel's closure, on Saturday mornings from 7-8 a.m. and Sunday mornings from 7-9 a.m.

The channel incorporated a large news ticker consisting of news headlines, weather information, sports scores and advertisements. In addition to sharing branding and content with CITY-DT and content from 680 News, the channel aired content and features from several other Rogers-owned outlets including specialty channel Sportsnet, and Maclean's, MoneySense, Today's Parent and Hello! Canada magazines.

== History ==
Under the ownership of CHUM Limited, Citytv had operated CablePulse 24 (CP24), another Toronto-based local news channel, from 1998 to 2007. However, CHUM Limited was purchased in 2007 by Bell Globemedia (later renamed CTVglobemedia, and again renamed Bell Media in 2011 following its purchase by Bell Canada), which then sold the Citytv stations to Rogers Media. CTV retained ownership of CHUM's cable channels, including CP24, which was paired with CTV's CFTO-DT (channel 9) instead of Citytv.

Rogers was granted approval for a specialty channel licence for CityNews Channel by the Canadian Radio-television and Telecommunications Commission (CRTC) on December 10, 2008. The channel was then tentatively known as CITY News (Toronto), and was set to be launched in late 2009. However, this was delayed due to economic conditions as well as the reconstruction of Citytv's new headquarters at 33 Dundas Street East.

On May 30, 2011, the same day that Citytv's 2011-2012 television broadcast schedule was unveiled, Rogers announced plans to launch the new channel in the fall of the same year. The channel was launched on October 3, 2011, as CityNews Channel.

Rogers Cable initially carried the new channel on digital cable channel 1 in the GTA. However, on November 22, 2011, the channel was moved to Rogers digital cable channel 15, the former cable slot for CKXT (which had shut down on November 1, 2011 and had its licence revoked by the CRTC on November 18, 2011). Digital channel 1 has reverted to serving as a Rogers promotional channel. The channel was later added on Cogeco Cable in July 2012.

Like all specialty channels launched since 2001, CityNews Channel was not eligible to be carried on analogue cable, and thus PBS member station WNED-TV/Buffalo was moved to the channel 15 position for Toronto-area Rogers subscribers without a set-top box (WNED remained on channel 61 for digital cable subscribers).

Due to financial difficulties, Rogers Media ceased live broadcasts of the CityNews Channel on May 30, 2013, in order to redirect its news resources in Toronto to Citytv and CFTR. Until June 30, 2013, the channel maintained the news ticker, with the live video portion of the channel broadcasting live traffic camera feeds, weather maps, and promotions. At Rogers' request, the CRTC revoked CityNews Channel's broadcasting licence on October 1, 2013.

In 2022, Rogers launched successors to CityNews Channel, this time as streaming news channels branded as CityNews 24/7; the channel is operated in Toronto and West versions, and carried via the CityNews digital platforms, as well as Rogers' Amazon Prime Video Channels service Citytv+.
