= Anne Mroczkowski =

Canadian TV reporter and news anchor (born 1953)

Anne Mroczkowski (born July 16, 1953) is a Canadian TV reporter and news anchor. She is the former co-anchor of Global News Hour, along with Leslie Roberts, a job she started on June 1, 2010. Roberts announced Mroczkowski's departure on-air on August 13, 2013. Previously, she was the longtime co-anchor of CityPulse on Citytv in Toronto.

== Biography ==
Born in Hamilton, Ontario, Canada to a Polish and Slovak immigrant family, Mroczkowski was raised in Toronto. Divorced from her husband in 2006, she lives in Bloor West Village.

She began her career at the Global Television Network, then moving on to Citytv's CityNews (formerly CityPulse) newscast in Toronto, Ontario. She was the senior co-anchor of CityNews at Six, with Gord Martineau, from 1987 until she was let go on January 18, 2010, in a round of staff cutbacks.

On August 13, 2013, co-anchor Leslie Roberts announced on air that Mroczkowski would not be returning to the anchor desk after her vacation, and wished her the best in her future endeavours.
