= Joëlle-Ann Blanchette =

Canadian television presenter

Joëlle-Ann Blanchette is a Canadian television personality. She is the current host of CPAC's Détonations, a current affairs show covering Canadian politics from a youth perspective. Blanchette went on to become the communications advisor for the Jacques Cartier and Champlain Bridges Inc.
