= Peter Silverman =

Canadian broadcast journalist (1931–2021)

- Born: 5 July 1931; Montreal, Quebec, Canada
- Died: 7 October 2021 (aged 90)
- Occupation: TV journalist

Peter Guy Silverman OOnt (5 July 1931 – 7 October 2021) was a Canadian broadcast journalist based in Toronto, Ontario. His television journalism career began in 1974 as a reporter for Global Television Network's first years. In 1981, he moved to Citytv where he became a reporter for that station's CityPulse news program (now known as CityNews). He was host of Silverman Helps, an ombudsman-type feature for consumers that began in 1989, and ended on 4 June 2008 when he was dismissed without cause by Citytv's owner, Rogers Media. In September 2008, Silverman joined Toronto radio station CFRB to host a Saturday morning radio show called The Peter Silverman Show.

Born in Montreal, he graduated from Sir George Williams University, one of Concordia University's founding institutions, with a BA in 1953.

From 1953 to 1968 Silverman lived in the UK working for Institute of Race Relations and served in the British Army (Territorial Army) Emergency Reserve (TAER) rising to rank as captain in the Airborne.

Silverman had a PhD (History, University of Toronto) and a Diploma in Native Law and Administration from the University of Cape Town.

He is the author of two books on child welfare and child protection in Canada (Who Speaks for the Children? and Voices of a Lost Generation), as well as numerous articles in publications ranging from academic publications (such as the Journal of the United Services Institution, UK), The Globe and Mail, and Razor Magazine to the online World Security Network.

== Awards and recognition ==
In 1994, he was honoured by the Toronto Police with a citation for his work in revealing a computer fraud case. Silverman received RTNDA's Edward R Murrow Award in 2005. He was nominated for a Gemini Award in 2006 for Best Reportage with Terry O'Keefe and Anna Rodrigues. The following year, he was nominated for another Gemini in the Best Reportage category for the King West Opticians story. The Toronto chapter of the Association of Certified Fraud Examiners presented Silverman with an award in recognition of his fraud fighting in 2006. On 22 January 2009, Silverman was made a member of the Order of Ontario. He received the RTNDA lifetime achievement award on 26 June 2009.

In 2012, Silverman was presented with the Queen's Diamond Jubilee Medal for his continuing volunteer work with NGOs.
