= Jojo Chintoh =

Canadian television journalist

- Born: April 10, 1944 (age 82); Ghana
- Occupation: Television journalist
- Spouse: Ama deGraft-Johnson

Jojo Chintoh (born c. 1944) is a Ghanaian-Canadian television journalist who worked as a feature and documentary reporter for Citytv in Toronto until 2009–10.

== Biography ==
Born in Ghana as a member of the Fante people, Chintoh moved to Canada in 1969. Prior to moving to Canada, Chintoh worked as a television director and producer. Chintoh began his journalism career in Canada when he was one of thirteen interns hired by the Toronto Star in 1972 out of more than 2,000 applicants. He went on to be the editor of several newspapers, including Contrast, before joining Citytv in 1978. He was hired at a time when Moses Znaimer was making efforts to have television personalities reflect the diverse cultures of the city, and Chintoh was the first black reporter on the station. He focused on crime reporting for the station in the early 1990s.

In 1985, Chintoh received a CanPro award and a Gemini award nomination for his series Down and Out in Parkdale. He received the 1984 Sovereign Award from the Canadian Racing Community for his Quest for the Plate series.

== Personal life ==
Chintoh is married to Ama deGraft-Johnson, a former anesthetist who worked in Hamilton, Ontario for over 30 years.

=== Political views ===
During the 2014 Toronto mayoral election, Chintoh endorsed former Progressive Conservative Party of Ontario leader and 2003 mayoral runner-up John Tory for mayor. In 2014, Chintoh endorsed Liberal Party nominee Adam Vaughan as a Member of Parliament for Trinity-Spadina.
