= Francis D'Souza =

Canadian journalist

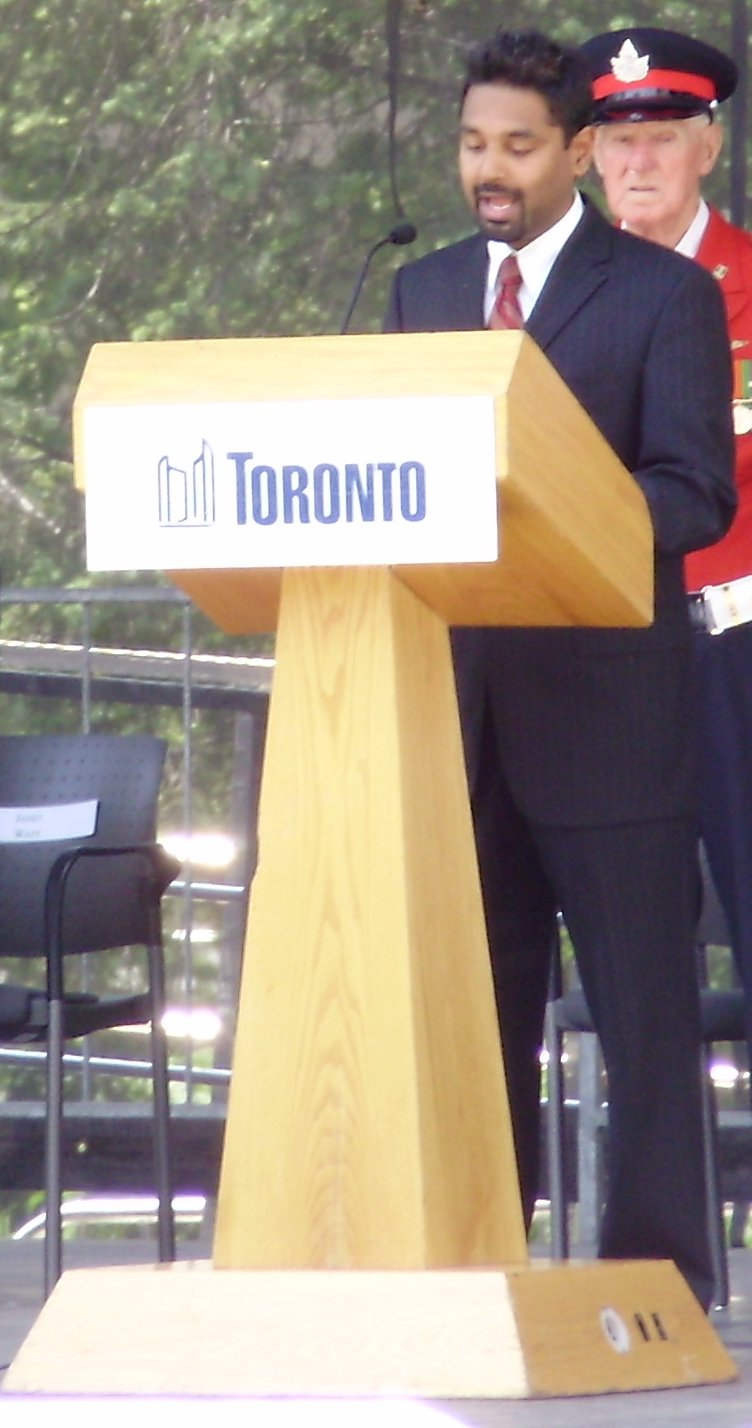
Francis D'Souza

Francis D'Souza is a Canadian television executive and a former broadcaster. He is the Managing Editor of News Programming at CBC, nationally, and a former television news anchor for Citytv in Toronto, Ontario.

== Biography ==
D'Souza became interested in a career in television after being selected from Citytv's Lunch Television audience to perform the opening announcement on Queen Street. Prior to joining Citytv, D'Souza volunteered at Rogers Cable TV in Mississauga, his home town. He was chosen to host Plugged In! on Rogers Television. He was a production assistant with the CBC, a videographer at Global News Toronto and for two years (2000-2002) in Sudbury, Ontario anchored the CTV Northern Ontario (CICI-TV) News at 11:30pm in Northern Ontario.

At Toronto's Citytv, he co-anchored a weekend newscast with Merella Fernandez and co-anchored a noon newscast until that program was cut in January 2010. D'Souza anchored the 5 pm newscast from its inception in 2011 until May 2019. He also served as substitute anchor for morning program Breakfast Television.

In June 2019 D’Souza joined CBC as Managing Editor of News Programming, overseeing the journalism, operation and strategic direction of The National, World at 6, World Report, World this Weekend, Front Burner, and CBC News Specials.

== Education ==
- B.A.A. 2000, Radio and Television Arts, Ryerson Polytechnic University

D'Souza graduated from Clarkson Secondary School in 1996.

== Awards ==
- 2019 Canadian Screen Award, Best Live News Special, CityNews - #CityVote - The Debate
- 2011 Gemini Award, Best Breaking Reportage, Local, CityNews - G20 Summit
