= Tracy Moore (journalist) =

Canadian television journalist

- Born: January 6, 1975 (age 51); Richmond Hill, Ontario
- Education: Langstaff Secondary School; McGill University; University of Western Ontario
- Occupations: Journalist, TV host

Tracy Moore (born January 6, 1975) is a Canadian television journalist, best known as host of the lifestyle talk show CityLine on Citytv from 2008 to 2024.

She previously served as news anchor on Citytv Toronto's Breakfast Television from 2005 to 2008, and occasionally filled in for Dina Pugliese as co-host of the program during that time. In 2024, Citytv announced the cancellation of CityLine and reassigned Moore back to Breakfast Television, where she was to cohost a new hour of lifestyle features with Cheryl Hickey, but the network announced in January 2025 that the new program would not proceed.

Growing up in Richmond Hill, Ontario, she went to Langstaff Secondary School. Moore then earned a bachelor's degree in political science at McGill University; her initial career goal was to be a lawyer, but she developed an interest in journalism while volunteering at the campus radio station CKUT-FM. She then completed a master's degree in journalism at the University of Western Ontario.

Moore began her career in journalism as a videographer for CBC Television, then worked for the now-defunct Toronto television station CKXT-TV before joining Citytv. She became host of CityLine in 2008, after Marilyn Denis left the show to work for Bell Media.

In January 2023, she was named the winner of the Academy of Canadian Cinema and Television's Changemaker Award at the 11th Canadian Screen Awards. In 2026, Moore was appointed to the Order of Ontario.

She is married to Lio Perron, and has two children, Sidney and Eva.
