= Jennifer Valentyne =

Canadian television personality (born 1967)

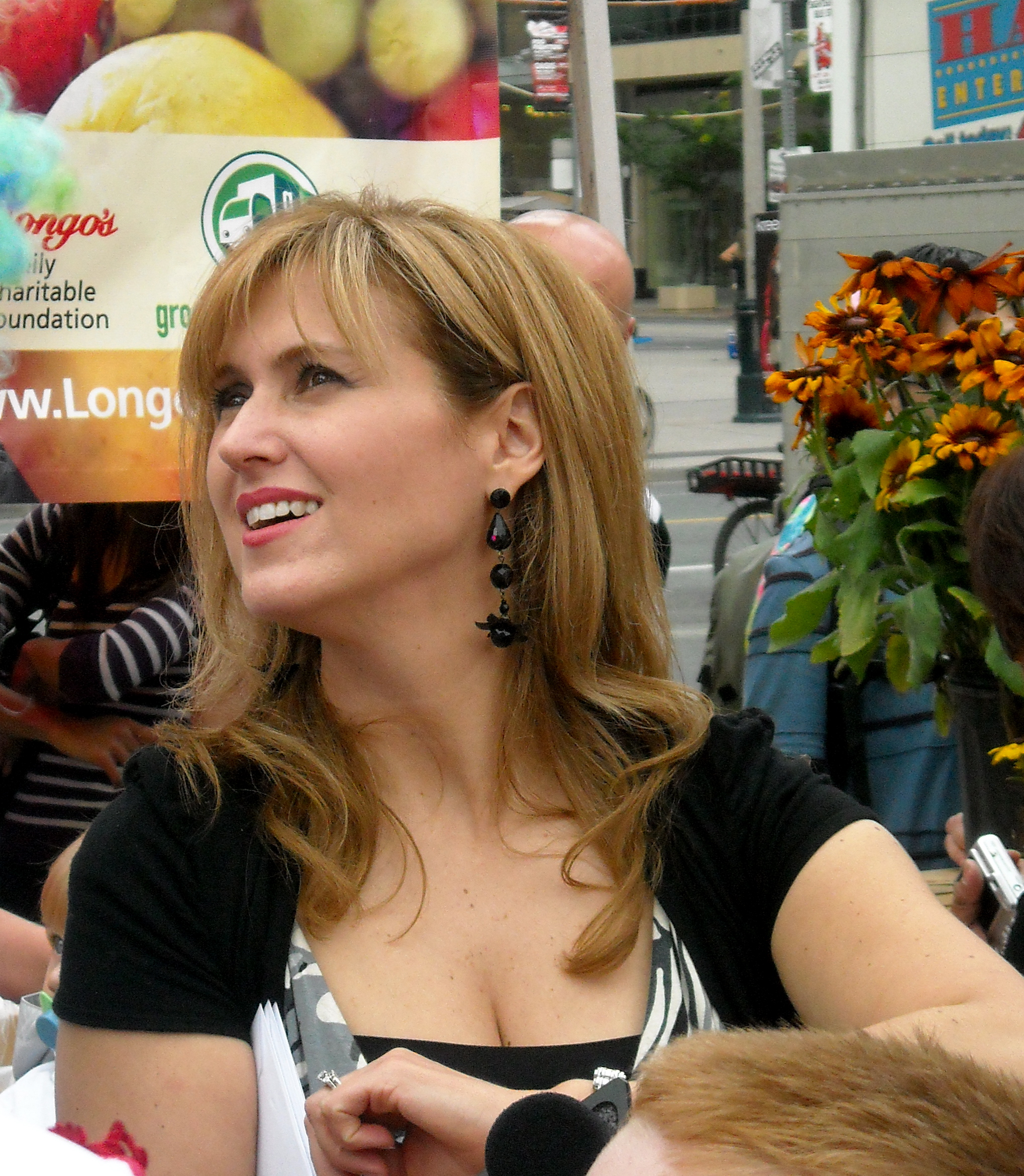
- Valentyne at Breakfast Television Viewer Appreciation Day 2008
- Born: May 31, 1967 (age 59)
- Occupations: Television and radio personality
- Years active: 1992–present
- Spouse: Greg Valentyne

Jennifer Elizabeth Valentyne (née Peck, born May 31, 1967) is a Canadian television personality. Her longest running role was on Breakfast Television in Toronto for 23 years where she went from being a weather specialist to hosting the "Live Eye" and being the stand in co-host. From 2016 to 2020, she had various positions on Corus Entertainment properties, first as the host of The Bachelor Canada and The Bachelorette Canada After Show on W Network (2016-2017), as co-host on Derringer in the Morning on Q107 in Toronto (2017-2019), and co-host of the Toronto edition of Global News Morning (2019-2020).

== Education and career ==
Valentyne graduated from David and Mary Thomson Collegiate Institute and earned a Radio and Television Broadcasting Diploma from Toronto's Centennial College. She began work at City Toronto in 1987, as an intern and then a graphics operator with MuchMusic. In the early 1990s she appeared as "The Prize Queen" on Speakers Corner and hosted 30-second spots called "MuchHappenings". In 1992 she became a regular as the "Singing Weathergirl" on Breakfast Television, where she worked doing "Live Eye" segments and as a fill-in co-host until her position was eliminated in April 2016.

She is a former Toronto Argonauts cheerleader and has posed as the Toronto Sun's Sunshine Girl. She is also a singer-songwriter. She sings jazz standards and originals; she sings on BT Holiday Favourites, a CD released by City Toronto in 2007.

Valentyne moved to Corus Entertainment where she became the host of The Bachelorette Canada and The Bachelor Canada After Show on W Network in 2016 and 2017. From February 2017 until February 2019, she was co-host on Derringer in the Morning on Corus-owned Q107.

In March 2019, Valentyne moved to Corus-owned Global News Toronto as a morning co-anchor. Valentyne was laid off by Corus in August 2020.

In May 2022, Valentyne announced, through a video posted to social media, that she had filed a complaint with the Canadian Human Rights Commission (CHRC) alleging gender discrimination by a previous employer. Corus subsequently acknowledged that it was party to a process involving Valentyne and the CHRC, and announced that it had put Derringer in the Morning on hiatus pending the results of an external investigation.

=== Digital media ===
In 2017, Valentyne and her daughter Georgia launched Mother Daughter Date, a lifestyle project documenting their activities together through social media. They subsequently co-hosted a podcast of the same name. Valentyne has also produced lifestyle content focused on cooking, entertaining, fashion and home projects.

== Human rights complaint against Corus Entertainment ==
In May 2022, Valentyne announced through a video posted to social media that she had filed a complaint against Corus Entertainment with the Canadian Human Rights Commission. She alleged that she had experienced gender discrimination, verbal abuse and an unsafe working environment while employed as a co-host of Derringer in the Morning on Q107.

Corus acknowledged that it was involved in a process with Valentyne and the commission and placed Derringer in the Morning on hiatus while an external investigation was conducted. Several other former Corus employees subsequently made allegations concerning the workplace environment at Q107. Corus and the program's host, John Derringer, ended their association in August 2022.

The complaint was referred to the Canadian Human Rights Tribunal as Valentyne v. Corus Entertainment Inc. During hearings that began in October 2025, Valentyne testified that Derringer subjected her to verbal abuse and gender-based discrimination and that Corus management failed to respond adequately to her complaints. She said that she had repeatedly raised concerns with managers but that the conduct continued.

The tribunal had not issued a decision as of August 2026, and additional hearing dates remained scheduled.

== Personal life ==
She is married to Greg Valentyne, a freelance producer/camera operator and founder of Heroes Beer. They have two children, Jackson and Georgia Valentyne.
