= Marilyn Denis =

Canadian television and radio personality

- Born: July 1, 1958 (age 68); Edmonton, Alberta, Canada
- Education: University of Idaho
- Occupations: Daytime talk show host, radio personality
- Years active: 1976–present
- Spouse: Jim Helman (m. 2018)
- Children: Adam Wylde

Marilyn Denis OOnt (born July 1, 1958) is a Canadian television and radio personality. Denis was the host of The Marilyn Denis Show until her retirement from that role on June 9, 2023. She was also the co-host of CHUM-FM's The Marilyn Denis Show, until her retirement in 2026.

== Early life and education ==
Born in Edmonton, Alberta, she grew up in Pittsburgh, Pennsylvania and received a bachelor's degree in radio, television and advertising from the University of Idaho.

== Career ==
Denis began her broadcasting career at a local radio station in Moscow, Idaho, and later moved to Calgary where she worked at CHFM-FM & CJAY-FM. In addition, she was a sports and entertainment reporter and weather announcer at CFCN-TV and TSN.

Since July 2, 1986, Denis has been one of the co-hosts of CHUM-FM's morning show. Originally titled Roger, Rick and Marilyn, co-hosting with Roger Ashby and Rick Hodge, then Roger and Marilyn after the departure of Hodge in June 2008 (Hodge's replacement, Darren B. Lamb, departed from the station in September 2015) until Ashby's retirement in December 2018.

Denis currently hosts the morning drive slot on CHUM-FM titled The Marilyn Denis Show from 5 a.m. to 9 a.m. with co-host David Corey, who joined the show on September 16, 2024.

From September 5, 1989 to May 23, 2008, she also hosted the syndicated daytime talk show CityLine on Citytv and A-Channel.

With the CTVglobemedia purchase of CHUM Limited, and the subsequent sale of five Citytv stations to Rogers Media, mandated by the Canadian Radio-television and Telecommunications Commission, Denis temporarily found herself working for two separate media competitors. To resolve this situation, Denis announced that she would be leaving Cityline after 19 years to pursue current and future projects with the CTV Television Network. Denis hosted her last show on May 23, 2008.

In June 2008, Denis announced she would be hosting a new show, The Marilyn Denis Show, on CTV, which was scheduled to premiere in fall 2010. However, due to studio construction, the program premiered on January 10, 2011 on CTV. On April 13, 2023 she announced she would be ending the show on June 9, but would be continuing on as cohost on her CHUM radio morning show. On February 26, 2026, she announced her retirement from radio, airing her last show on June 26.

== Personal life ==
Denis resides in downtown Toronto. On May 8, 2018, Marilyn announced that she was engaged to her high-school prom date, Jim Helman. They married on June 19, 2018.

Her son, Adam Wylde (born 1988), formerly the morning co-host with Jax Irwin at Bell Media's CKFM-FM in Toronto, is the CEO and Head of Content & Partnerships at the Steve Dangle Podcast Network.

== Awards ==
In 2005 and 2006, Denis won the Viewer's Choice Award at the Gemini Awards. In 2007, Denis won the Gemini for Best Host in a Lifestyle/Information series for Cityline.

The Marilyn Denis Show was awarded Best Talk Program at the 2016 and 2018 Canadian Screen Awards.

In 2006, Denis was honoured with Canadian Music Week's "Rosalie Award", named after Canadian radio pioneer Rosalie Trombley, best known as radio programmer for radio station CKLW in Windsor. In 2017, Denis became the first female broadcaster to receive the Allan Waters Lifetime Achievement Award, presented at Canadian Music Week during the Canadian Music and Broadcast Industry Awards in Toronto.

Denis was awarded an honorary PhD in Humane Letters from her alma mater, the University of Idaho. Denis also delivered the commencement speech at the University of Idaho on May 13, 2017.

In 2024, she was named the recipient of the Academy of Canadian Cinema and Television's Lifetime Achievement Award at the 12th Canadian Screen Awards and was made a Member of Order of Ontario.
