= Jody Vance =

Canadian sportscaster

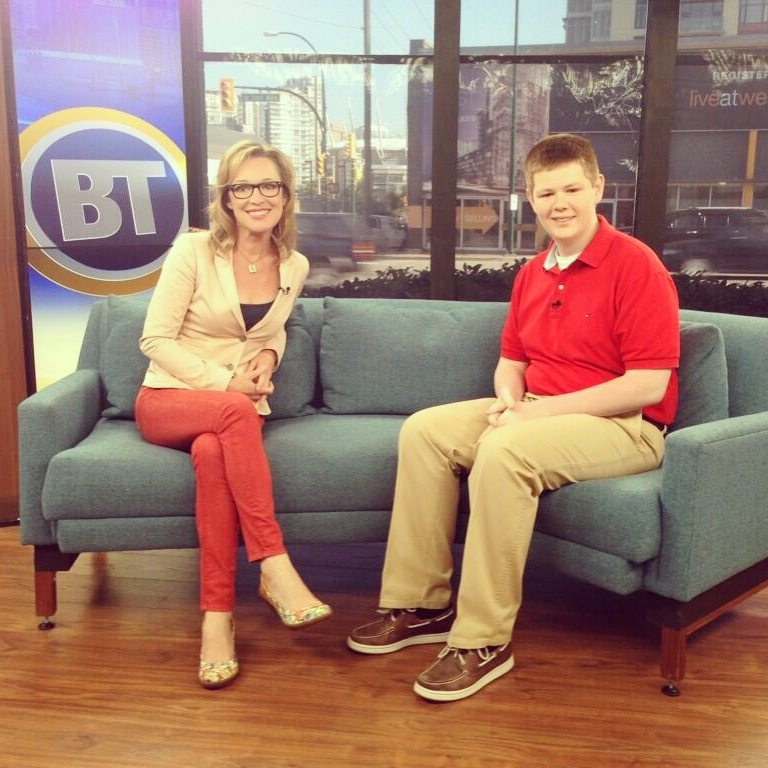
- Jody Vance and show guest Patrick Mott on Breakfast Television Vancouver on Citytv (CKVU-DT)
- Born: August 23, 1967 (age 59); Vancouver, British Columbia, Canada
- Presenting career
- Show: Steele and Vance
- Station: CHEK-DT
- Time slot: Thursday 8:00 - 9:00 p.m
- Country: Canada
- Previous shows: Breakfast Television Vancouver (CKVU-DT) - Citytv; Roundhouse Radio Midday Show (CIWV-FM)

Jody Vance (born August 23, 1967) is a Canadian sports anchor and former co-host of Breakfast Television (BT) on CKVU-DT in Vancouver. In 2000, she became the first woman in the history of Canadian television to host her own sports show in primetime.

== Broadcasting career ==
Vance began her broadcast career in Vancouver, British Columbia, on CHRX, and then moved to CFMI-FM/CKNW as the assistant promotions director and on-air fill-in talent. In 1995, she was hired as a sports anchor at BCTV.

After a short stint with BCTV, Vance helped launch the sports department at Vancouver Television. In the summer of 1999, she worked as a fill-in anchor for Sportsnet, a new Canadian sports network, and became the first woman to host the desk at the network. In March 2000, she moved to Toronto to host of its Sportscentral AM. After ratings increased, she was moved to the evening time slot, Sportscentral, on September 4, 2000, becoming the first woman in the history of Canadian television to host her own sports show in primetime.

After leaving Sportsnet in 2005, Vance was lead anchor at Leafs TV, the Toronto Maple Leafs-owned hockey channel from 2006 to 2009. Her final pregame was April 11, 2009, as the Leafs hosted the Ottawa Senators. In June 2009, Vance joined Shore 104 FM in Vancouver where she hosted an afternoon program called The Jody Vance Show. She also joined CBC Vancouver doing sports on top of her work at Shore 104.3 FM and hosted the Vancouver Canucks playoff post game show, "Seeking Stanley".

In October 2011, Vance was hired away from radio and the CBC to be the co-host and news anchor for Breakfast Television Vancouver on Citytv, where she re-joined some of her former Sportsnet colleagues. She was featured on Sportsnet Pacific Vancouver Canucks broadcasts as a panelist during intermissions. Vance was part of the on-air crew for the 2012 CONCACAF Women's Olympic Qualifying Tournament at BC Place broadcast nationally on Sportsnet. In May 2016, it was announced she was no longer with Breakfast Television.

In September 2017, Vancouver station Roundhouse Radio unveiled that Vance had been hired as its new midday host.

In September 2022, Vance joined Victoria television station CHEK-DT as the co-host of Steele and Vance, airing weekly Thursday nights at 8:00 PM with co-host Lynda Steele out of CHEK's Vancouver studios. Co-host Lynda Steele described the show as real, authentic conversations about local, national and international topics that are relevant to life in B.C. today.
