= Gord Martineau =

Canadian journalist

- Born: September 23, 1947 (age 78); Montreal, Quebec, Canada
- Occupation: Journalist
- Children: 2 (Julia and Taylor)

Gord Martineau (born September 23, 1947) is a Canadian television journalist. In April 2007, he received a lifetime achievement award from the RTNDA for 40 years in broadcasting.

Martineau worked briefly in radio in Halifax, Nova Scotia and Montreal with CJAD, as well as CJCH-TV in Halifax and CFCF-TV in Montreal before heading to Toronto. At CFCF-TV he served as weekend anchor of "Pulse". In Toronto, he worked briefly for CFTO-TV but made his name as the senior anchor of Citytv's CityNews (formerly CityPulse) newscast in Toronto. He was with the station since its inception, except for a few weeks in 1980 when he moved to Global Television Network as a news co-anchor for CIII. The job did not work out, so Martineau returned to CityPulse. He signed off from Citytv for the last time February 29, 2016.

Martineau has also appeared as a news anchor in a few movies filmed in Toronto, including Undue Influence, Dirty Work, and Urban Legend. He played a similar role in the 2012 web series Guidestones.

Martineau has been associated with the Kidney Foundation, the Kid's Helpline, the Fred Victor Centre, the Canadian Breast Cancer Foundation, Mount Sinai Hospital, the Ireland Fund and most notably, the Herbie Fund where he has personally escorted children in need of life-saving surgery from countries as far away as the Philippines to superlative care at the Hospital for Sick Children.
