= A Morning =

- Genre: Morning show
- Country of origin: Canada
- Original language: English

Production
- Production locations: Ottawa, Ontario; Barrie, Ontario; Southwestern Ontario; Victoria, British Columbia

Original release
- Network: CHRO-TV
- Release: 1997 – 2011
- Network: A
- Release: 1998 – 2009

Related
- A News

A Morning (formerly New Day, Breakfast at The New RO in the case of Ottawa, and A-Channel Morning) is a morning television show that formerly aired on Canada's CHRO-TV in Ottawa and the other stations in the A system (except for A Atlantic).

Due to severe financial issues, as of March 4, 2009, only one edition of A Morning aired, namely the one at CHRO-TV Ottawa. The versions in Barrie and London were cancelled outright, with the timeslot filled by encores of the previous day's late news, while the Victoria edition was replaced with a simulcast of CFAX 1070's morning show.

A Atlantic continued to produce its own morning program, Breakfast Television. Following the re-launch of A as CTV Two on August 29, 2011, and the re-alignment of the stations' news operations with the CTV News branding, both Breakfast Television in the Atlantic and A Morning in Ottawa were re-branded as CTV Morning Live.

== Barrie ==
CKVR in Barrie launched its A Morning show on September 8, 2008. Previously the station aired a simulcast of Citytv Toronto's Breakfast Television with its own local news inserts.

Following the program's cancellation a mere six months later, CKVR currently airs 6 repeats of the previous evening's 11:00 p.m. newscasts between 6 a.m. and 9 a.m.

== London/Windsor ==
Similar to CKVR in Barrie, CFPL London and CHWI in Windsor both now run a loop of CFPL's 11:00 p.m. newscast between 6 and 9 a.m.

== Pembroke/Ottawa ==
CTV Morning Live on CTV 2 airs in the Pembroke/Ottawa market. Airs from 6-10 am weekdays and Saturdays from 7-9 am.

=== Personalities ===
- Hosts: Leslie Roberts, Annette Goerner
- Weather: Rosey Edeh

== Victoria ==
CIVI's A Morning in Victoria relaunched on September 8, 2008. CIVI previously aired a local A-Channel Morning, anchored by Bruce Williams, from its launch in 2001 until its cancellation of in 2006 when CTVglobemedia announced it would takeover CHUM Limited. During the time the show was cancelled, a rebroadcast of the previous evenings A-Channel News at 5 and 6 was shown in its timeslot.

CIVI has replaced the morning show with a simulcast of Bell Media's radio station in Victoria CFAX.

== Atlantic Canada ==
The cable-only A Atlantic station in Atlantic Canada produces a similar morning program, although its program uses the name Breakfast Television, which it previously licensed from Citytv.

== Morning show presentation ==
2004-2005

2005-2008
