= Low-head hydro power =

Hydroelectric power using water with a small vertical height difference

Low-head hydro power refers to the development of hydroelectric power where the head is typically less than 20 metres, although precise definitions vary. Head is the vertical height measured between the hydro intake water level and the water level at the point of discharge. Using only a low head drop in a river or tidal flows to create electricity may provide a renewable energy source that will have a minimal impact on the environment. Since the generated power (calculated the same as per general hydropower) is a function of the head these systems are typically classed as small-scale hydropower, which have an installed capacity of less than 5MW.

== Comparison to conventional hydro ==
Most current hydroelectric projects use a large hydraulic head to power turbines to generate electricity. The hydraulic head either occurs naturally, such as a waterfall, or is created by constructing a dam in a river valley, creating a reservoir. Using a controlled release of water from the reservoir drives the turbines. The costs and environmental impacts of constructing a dam can make traditional hydroelectric projects unpopular in some countries. From 2010 onwards new innovative ecologically friendly technologies have evolved and have become economically viable.

Within low-head hydropower there are several of standard situations:

Run-of-the-river: Low-head small hydropower can be produced from rivers, often described as run-of-river or run-of-the-river projects. Suitable locations include weirs, streams, locks, rivers and wastewater outfalls. Weirs are common in rivers across Europe, as well as rivers that are canalized or have groynes. Generating significant power from low-head locations using conventional technologies typically requires large volumes of water. Due to the low rotational speeds produced, gearboxes are required to efficiently drive generators, which can result in large and expensive equipment and civil infrastructure.

Tidal power: In combination with a lagoon or barrage the tides can be used to create a head difference. The largest tidal range is at the Bay of Fundy, between the Canadian provinces of New Brunswick and Nova Scotia, Canada which can reach 13.6m. The first tidal range installation was opened in 1966 at Le Rance, France.

Low-head pumped seawater storage: Currently at very low TRL levels but in the coming decade these technologies could become part of the energy system.

Dynamic tidal power: Another potentially promising type of low-head hydro power is dynamic tidal power, a novel and unapplied method to extract power from tidal movements. Although a dam-like structure is required, no area is enclosed, and therefore most of the benefits of 'damless hydro' are retained, while providing for vast amounts of power generation.

Low-head hydro is not to be confused with "free flow" or "stream" technologies, which work solely with the kinetic energy and the velocity of the water.

== Types of low-head turbines ==
Turbines suitable for use in very-low-head applications are different from the Francis, propeller, Kaplan, or Pelton types used in more conventional large hydro. Different types of low-head turbines are:

- Venturi-enhanced turbine: This type of turbine uses venturi principles to achieve a pressure amplification for the turbine so that smaller, faster, no-gearbox turbines can be deployed in low-head hydro settings, without the need for large infrastructure or large watercourses. Water passing through a venturi (a constriction) creates an area of low pressure. A turbine discharging into this area of low pressure then experiences a higher pressure differential, i.e. a higher head. Only ca. 20% of the flow passes through the propeller turbine and therefore requires screening but fish and aquatic life can pass safely through the venturi (80% of the flow), preventing the need for large screens. Venturi turbines can be used at low heads (1.5–5 metres) and medium to high flows (1m^{3}/s–20 m^{3}/s). Multiple turbines can be installed in parallel.
- Archimedes screw: Water is fed into the top of the screw forcing it to rotate. The rotating shaft can then be used to drive an electric generator. A gear box is required, since the rotational speed is very low. The screw is used at low heads (1.5–5 metres) and medium to high flows (1 to 20 m^{3}/s). For higher flows, multiple screws are used. Due to the construction and slow movement of the blades of the turbine, the turbine tends to be very large but is considered to be friendly to aquatic wildlife.
- Kaplan turbine: This turbine is a propeller-type turbine which has adjustable blades to achieve efficiency over a wide range of heads and flows. The Kaplan can be used at low to medium heads (1.5–20 metres) and medium to high flows (3 m^{3}/s–30 m^{3}/s). For higher flows multiple turbines can be used. They present a risk to aquatic life and in most situations require complete screening.
- Cross-flow turbine: Also known as Banki-Mitchell or Ossberger turbines, these devices are used for a large range of hydraulic heads (from 2 to 100 meters) and flow rates (from 0.03 to 20 m^{3}/s), but are more efficient for low heads and low power outputs. They are considered "impulse" turbines, since they get energy from water by reducing its velocity (all hydraulic energy is converted into kinetic energy). They present a high risk to aquatic life and require complete screening.
- Water wheel: Water wheels can be used at low heads (1–5 metres) and medium flows (0.3–1.5 m^{3}/s) and are considered safe for aquatic life.
- Gravitation water vortex power plant: This type of hydro power plant use the power of a gravitation water vortex, which only exists at low head.

== Environmental impact of low-head hydropower ==
A number of concerns have been raised about the environmental impacts of river current and tidal devices. Among the most important of these are:

- Aquatic life. Concerns have been raised about the danger of rotating blades to aquatic life, such as seals and fish. Installations within watercourses can be screened to ensure marine life does not come into contact with any moving parts. After extensive testing and auditing by environmental regulators technology can gain certification to show they are safe for smolts, mature fish, eels and marine ecosystems.
- Bathymetry. By altering wave patterns and tidal streams, devices will undoubtedly have an effect, for example, on the deposition of sediment. Research carried out to date would seem to indicate that the effects would not be significant, and may even be positive, for example by helping to slow down coastal erosion. (This is particularly pertinent in light of evidence that waves have steadily increased in size in the recent past.) The sea in the lee of devices would almost certainly be calmer than normal, but, it has been suggested, this would help in creating more areas for activities such as water sports or yachting.
- Landscape. In rivers or similar watercourses, sensitive environmental parameters can make planning permissions for hydropower installations difficult. Large infrastructure, and above water visible infrastructure such as Archimedes Screw systems and turbine houses can incur objections. In addition, vibrations and noise levels from gearboxes can cause environmental objections due to feared impact on local wildlife such as otters or birds (for example, at Balmoral Estate, Scotland). The main impact would probably be from the extensive transmission lines needed to take the energy from the shoreline to final users. This problem would have to be addressed, possibly by using underground transmission lines.

Weirs and groynes have historically been used for water management and to permit upstream riverine transportation. Weirs and groynes can have negative effects on river bathymetry and prevent upstream fish migration that will have an effect on local ecology and water levels. By installing low-head hydropower turbines on historic structures sediment transport can be increased along with new fish migration passages, either through the turbine itself or by installing fish ladders.

Where large sites aren't cleared “the vegetation overwhelmed by the rising water decays to form methane – a far worse greenhouse gas than carbon dioxide”, particularly in the tropics. Low-head dams and weirs do not produce harmful methane. Groynes but also weirs prevent the transport of silt (sediment) downstream to fertilize fields and to move sediment towards the oceans.

Low-head hydropower is typically installed close to areas where the energy is needed, preventing the need for large electrical transmission lines.

== Implementation and regulations ==
=== Government regulation ===
Most government regulation comes from the use of waterways. Most low-head water turbine systems are smaller engineering projects than traditional water turbines. Even so, one needs to obtain permission from state and federal government institutions before implementing these systems. Some of the constraints faced with these systems in larger waterways are making sure waterways can still be used for boats and making sure that routes of migration of fish are not disturbed.

=== Government subsidies ===
US government subsidies can be obtained for implementation of small-scale hydro facilities most easily through federal grants, namely green energy grants. A specific example is the Renewable Electricity Production Tax Credit. This is a federal tax credit aimed at promoting renewable energy resources. To qualify, the hydro source must have a minimum capacity of 150 kW. This subsidy is given for the first ten years of production. Organizations receive $.011/kWh. For hydroelectric projects, this subsidy expired on December 31, 2017.

=== Public perception ===
Since these are sustainable energy source, are non detrimental to the water sources they utilize and are visually not an eyesore, they are well regarded within the public sphere. However, there is little public and industrial knowledge of these systems as they are still being tested to "answer real-world questions". As such, proponents and manufacturers of these systems have tried to bring them into public knowledge.

== See also ==
- Eaton Socon Venturi-Enhanced Turbine Technology Project
- Oryon Watermill
- Verdant Power
- Race Rocks Tidal Power Demonstration Project
- Hydropower
- Micro hydro
- Renewable energy
- Run-of-the-river hydroelectricity
