= A News (TV program) =

Name of newscasts on Canada's A TV network

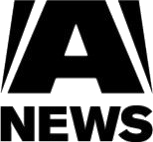
- Formerly: A-Channel News
- Industry: Media
- Genre: News
- Founded: September 1, 1995
- Defunct: April 1, 2011
- Fate: Renamed to CTV News in 2011
- Successor: CTV News
- Headquarters: 299 Queen Street West, Toronto, Ontario, Canada
- Area served: Southern Ontario and Vancouver Island
- Key people: Moses Znaimer, Manager, CHUM Limited; Richard Gray, Head of News Department
- Owner: CHUM Limited (1995–2007); CTVglobemedia (2007–2011)
- Parent: NewNet/A-Channel/A

A News
- A News open for all A stations except for CIVI. An additional "Vancouver Island" tag is added for CIVI's open.
- Also known as: A-Channel News; VRLand News (1995–1999, Barrie); VR News (1999-2005, Barrie); NewsSixOttawa (1997-2005, Ottawa); NewsNow (1997-2005, London, Windsor and Wingham)
- Genre: News
- Country of origin: Canada
- Original language: English

Production
- Production locations: Ottawa, Ontario; Barrie, Ontario; Southwestern Ontario; Victoria, British Columbia
- Production companies: CHUM Limited (1995–2007); CTVglobemedia (2007–2011)

Original release
- Network: A
- Release: August 2, 2005 – August 28, 2011

Related
- A Morning; CityNews (on Citytv)

A News (originally known as A-Channel News) is the name of local newscasts on the A television system in Canada owned by CHUM Limited and CTVglobemedia. A News programming was produced in markets which were not directly served by a local CTV News or CityNews service.

The cable-only A Atlantic service in Atlantic Canada did not produce its own A News programming, but instead presently airs CTV News programming from CTV Atlantic, although the station did produce a local morning show, Breakfast Television and was subsequently re-branded to CTV Morning Live on August 29, 2011. Due to the effects of the 2009 economic crisis, the A station in Ottawa cancelled all A News programming in March 2009, but continued to produce a local morning show, A Morning which was also re-branded as CTV Morning Live on August 29, 2011.

Throughout its earlier existence, the newscasts were formatted after its long-standing station, CITY-TV in Toronto in which the anchors read the news standing up and walking around the studio since there were no news desks.

When A re-launched as CTV Two on August 29, 2011, newscasts on the A stations were re-branded as CTV News and longer have separate identities, although the stations have retained the same editorial independence.

== Atlantic ==
As a holdover from the ASN era, A Atlantic simulcasted news programs from CTV Atlantic, and it was the only A station that does not air any A News-branded programs. It also aired a local version of Breakfast Television, a holdover from when it was owned by CHUM Limited.

== Barrie ==
A-Channel News on CKVR-TV in Barrie was anchored by Tony Grace and Jayne Pritchard weekdays at 6 p.m., by Jayne Pritchard weekdays at 11 p.m., and anchored by Chris Lesage on weekends at 6 p.m. and 11 p.m.

A-Channel News This Week, a newscast that generally focused on the week's top local news stories formerly aired Saturday nights at 11 p.m. Ontario News This Week, a newscast that generally focused on the week's top provincial-related as well as national and international news stories also formerly aired Sunday nights at 11 p.m.

Due to the 2009 economic crisis, both Barrie's A News This Week and Ontario News This Week were cancelled along with the A Morning shows produced in Barrie, London and Vancouver Island in early March 2009.

== Ottawa ==
A-Channel News on CHRO-TV in Ottawa was anchored by Sandra Blaikie weekdays at 6, Tony Grace weeknights at 11 and Annette Goerner on weekends. A spinoff version of A News called A News This Week aired Sunday nights at 6:30 p.m. and recapped the week's news.

These newscasts were cancelled on March 3, 2009, as a result of what CTV called severe financial issues with the A stations, although the Ottawa station continues to broadcast A-Channel Morning. CHRO was the only A station (unlike the A station in Wingham which was scheduled to shut down entirely) to have its evening newscasts cancelled; the stations in Barrie, London and Victoria kept their evening newscasts but instead lost their morning shows. Due to a fire destroying CJOH's longtime studios and newsroom in nearby Nepean, production of CJOH's newscasts was moved to CHRO's studios in downtown Ottawa's ByWard Market in February 2010.

== London/Windsor ==
A-Channel News on CFPL-TV in London was anchored by Kathy Mueller & Dan MacLellan weekdays at 6, and Tara Overholt at 11. There was a weekend half-hour edition of the program, anchored by Sean Irvine. CHWI-TV in Windsor had a separate weekday newscast anchored by Jim Crichton, but simulcasts the London edition on weekends. A spinoff version of A News called A News This Week aired Sunday nights at 6:30 p.m. and recapped the week's top stories.

When CKNX-TV in Wingham served as a semi-satellite of CFPL, it simulcasted all of CFPL's newscasts, except for the 11 p.m. weeknight newscast, an alternate newscast focusing on the Wingham area produced at CFPL. Due to financial issues, CKNX was switched to a full-time translator of CFPL on August 31, 2009, and no longer airs a separate newscast.

== Vancouver Island ==
A-Channel News on CIVI-TV in Victoria, British Columbia was anchored by Hudson Mack at 5 and 6 p.m., and Cheryl Bloxham at 11 p.m. A spinoff version of A News airs at 6:30 p.m. weeknights, called Vancouver Island Report, a newscast generally focused on news on Vancouver Island.

A weekend half-hour edition of A News at Six, anchored by Andrew Johnson was added to the schedule in March 2009, following the layoffs. A spinoff version of A News also aired Saturday evenings at 7:30 p.m. and Sunday mornings at 8:30 a.m. called Island Weekend, a half-hour recap on the news and events happening around Vancouver Island during the week.
