= Pay Chen =

Canadian television host (born 1976)

- Born: August 12, 1976 (age 50); Taiwan
- Education: Ryerson University (now Toronto Metropolitan University) (Radio and Television Arts)

Pay Chen (born August 12, 1976) is a Canadian television host, currently based in Toronto, Ontario, Canada.

Chen grew up in Halifax and Beaver Bank, Nova Scotia. She moved to Toronto to attend Ryerson University, later working in writing and production roles for television series produced by Treehouse TV, YTV, and TVOntario. She then switched to Toronto's OMNI Television, where she worked for seven years producing and hosting paid informational and lifestyle segments, as well as a series of fact segments.

In 2009, she joined Citytv Winnipeg, where she co-hosted Breakfast Television Winnipeg. Starting alongside Jon Ljungberg, she replaced Heather Steele, who moved elsewhere on the station. She also wrote a food column for Metro Winnipeg. Upon leaving Breakfast in late 2011, she moved back to Toronto, where she can now be found hosting her own radio show on CFRB. Chen also appears on Breakfast Television Toronto.

Her brother is a member of the Royal Canadian Mounted Police.

== Filmography ==
- Host, bio blast programming block (Biography Channel Canada)
- Poetry segment, 4 Square
- GNN News Anchor, Dark Matter
- Hi Opie!
