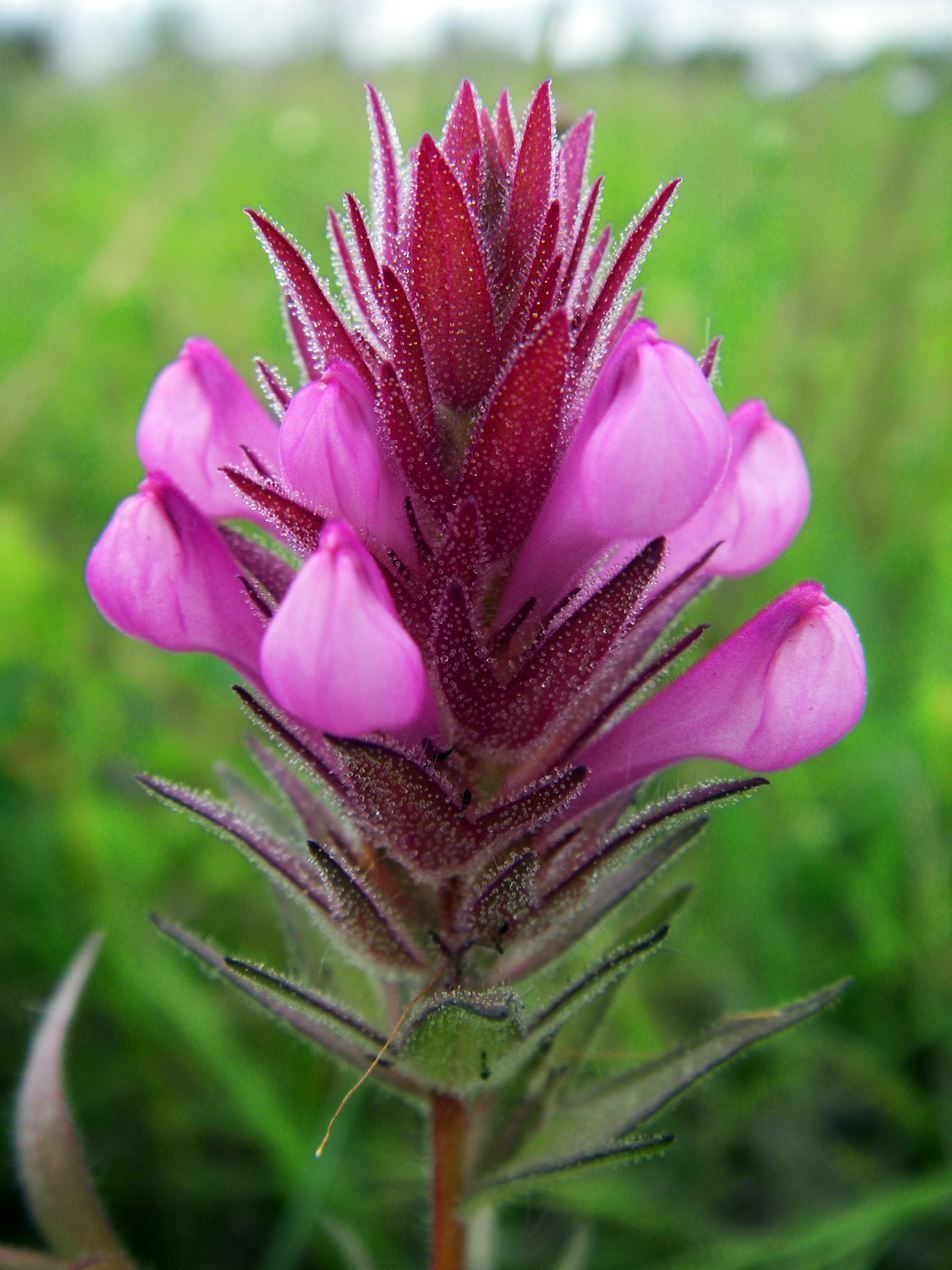

Conservation status
- Vulnerable (NatureServe)

Scientific classification
- Kingdom: Plantae
- Clade: Tracheophytes
- Clade: Angiosperms
- Clade: Eudicots
- Clade: Asterids
- Order: Lamiales
- Family: Orobanchaceae
- Genus: Orthocarpus
- Species: O. bracteosus

Binomial name
- Orthocarpus bracteosus Benth.

= Orthocarpus bracteosus =

Species of flowering plant

Orthocarpus bracteosus, known by the common name rosy owl's-clover, is a species of flowering plant in the broomrape family (Orobanchaceae). It is native to western North America from British Columbia to northern California, where it grows in moist habitats, such as meadows and vernal pools. In the northern and southern portions of its range, O. bracteosus is considered endangered or threatened.

== Description ==
=== General habit ===
Orthocarpus bracteosus is an annual herb that germinates in early spring and dies by mid-summer. The plants are small and slender, growing 10–40 cm (3.9–15.7 in) tall. As with other members of Orthocarpus, the plant is a hemiparasite, meaning that it obtains a portion (but not all) of its nutrients and water by parasitizing other plants. To do this, its roots graft to those of host plants via a tissue called a haustorium. O. bracteosus parasitizes a wide range of hosts from different families, including Poaceae, Fabaceae, and Asteraceae.

=== Stems and leaves ===
The stem, growing 10–40 cm (3.9–15.7 in) tall, is usually simple but sometimes branched toward the top. The narrow leaves are 1.5–3.5 cm (0.59–1.38 in) long, the upper ones divided into three deep lobes. The stem, leaves, bracts, and inflorescence are covered in a mix of rough hairs and fine, glandular hairs, with hairs toward the top of the plant becoming longer and softer. The inflorescence is a densely hairy spike of flowers, 3–20 cm (1.2–7.9 in) long, with three-lobed bracts that are similar to the distal leaves but often purple-tinged.

=== Flowers and fruit ===
Flowering occurs from late June to early September. The calyces (leaflike structures holding the flowers) are 0.6–1 cm (0.24–0.39 in) long, about half the length of the flower. As with the bracts, the calyces are deeply-lobed, covered in short, glandular hairs, and green to purple in color. The flowers are 1.2–2 cm (0.47–0.79 in) long, rosy-purple, pink, or sometimes white, and bear short, non-glandular hairs. They are club-shaped with a pouchlike lower lip and a narrow upper lip, called the galea, which protects the reproductive parts of the flower. The galea is 4–6 mm (0.16–0.24 in) long, with a down-ward projecting hook at its apex. The stigma sits below the galea tip, and the stamens bear two unequally-sized anther sacs.

The fruit is an oval-shaped capsule about 5–7 mm (0.20–0.28 in) long containing several seeds. The seeds are 1.8–2.5 mm (0.071–0.098 in) long, light brown, and have a ladder-like pattern of pitting. Chuang and Heckard proposed that the evolutionary significance of this seed morphology might be tied to aerodynamics for wind dispersal.

== Distribution ==
=== Geographic range ===
Orthocarpus bracteosus is native to western North America, from Northern California northward to the Trial Islands in British Columbia. There is a significant gap in the distribution between the Columbia River in southern Washington (Klickitat and Skamania Counties) and the populations in northwestern Washington and Vancouver Island. In Oregon, the plant is found on both sides of the Cascade Range. Its elevational range is 100–2,000 m (330–6,560 ft).

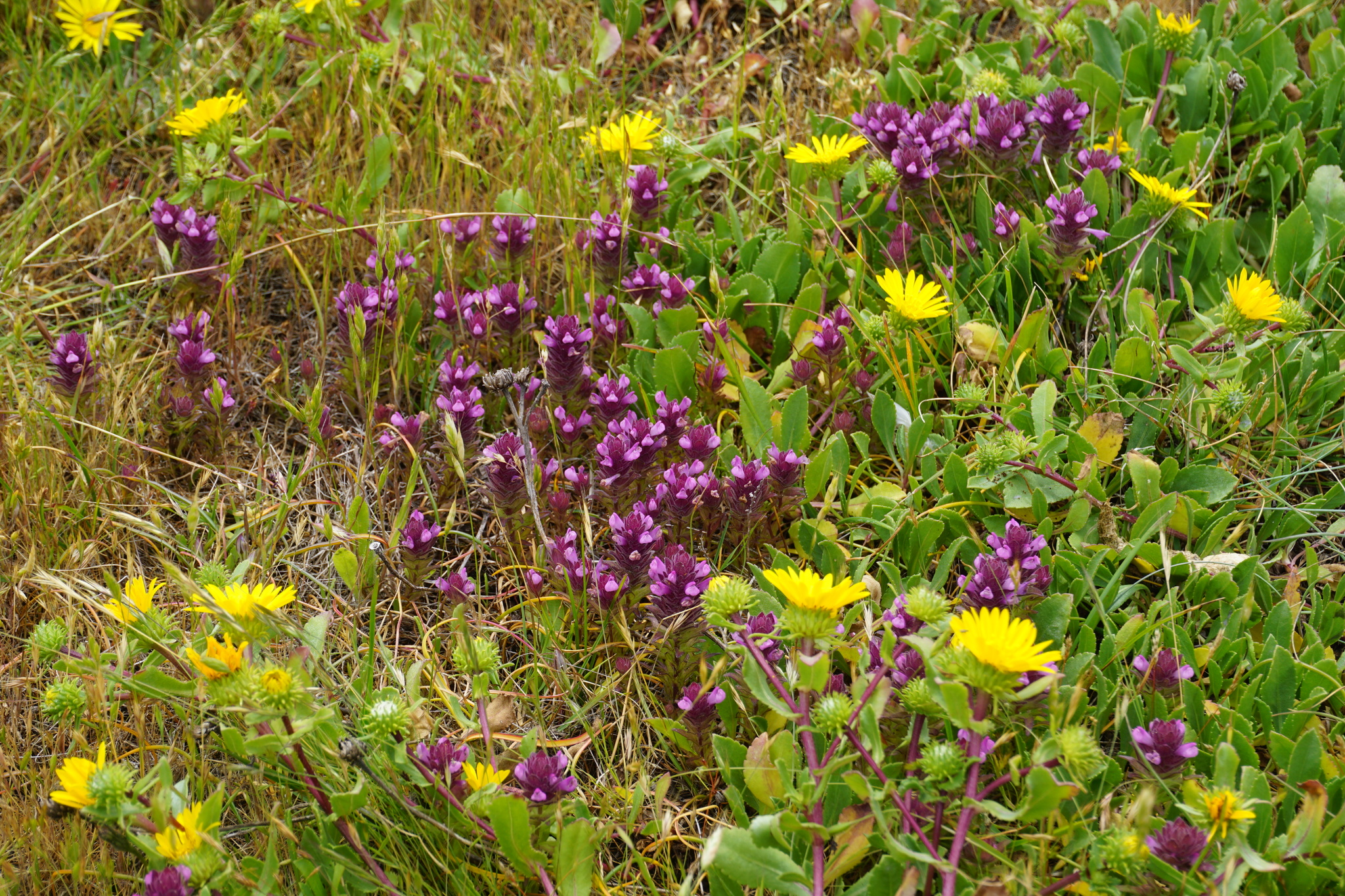
Orthocarpus bracteosus growing in a vernal pool

O. bracteosus is restricted to vernally wet meadows. It grows in graminoid-dominated habitats that experience summer drought and have high water tables in winter and spring, including vernal pools, wet meadows, depressions, and channels.

Outside its native range, O. bracteosus has been documented once in Cayuga County, New York (in 1918) and once in Maryland (in 2001). The New York plant was a waif that did not reproduce.

=== Conservation ===
In Canada, Orthocarpus bracteosus is considered endangered. Several populations of O. bracteosus in southwestern British Columbia are now extirpated, and there is only one known remaining Canadian population of the species, at the Trial Islands Ecological Reserve. The number of individuals in this population varies annually, fluctuating between 40 and 1000 plants. Threats to this population include pressure from invasive species, foot traffic, marine pollution, and stochastic forces.

NatureServe and the Washington Natural Heritage Program consider O. bracteosus imperiled (S2) in Washington. Threats include vulnerability to climate change, changes in hydrology, and barriers between extant populations. In particular, suitable habitat is scattered, making dispersal to new sites unlikely.

The CNPS Inventory of Rare and Endangered Plants of California considers O. bracteosus rare or endangered in California, with seven known occurrences. Of these populations, one is in Modoc National Forest, and the other six are on land of unknown ownership. Threats to the California populations include invasive species, grazing, and alteration of the preferred habitats, particularly by development and hydrological alterations.

== Taxonomy ==
David Douglas collected the type specimen of Orthocarpus bracteosus in the summer of 1825 along the Columbia River, either in Klickitat County, Washington or in Wasco County, Oregon, where he noted that it grew in abundance. George Bentham formally described the species ten years later, in 1835.

In 1927, David D. Keck revised Orthocarpus taxonomy and described white-flowered individuals as O. bracteosus var. albus. However, in their 1992 revision of Orthocarpus, Chuang and Heckard did not recognize this variety as taxonomically significant because it co-occurs with the purple-flowered individuals, placing it in synonymy with O. bracteosus. Currently, taxonomic authorities including Plants of the World Online, the Flora of North America, Flora of the Pacific Northwest, and the Burke Herbarium recognize O. bracteosus without any varieties.

Phylogenetic studies have affirmed that Orthocarpus is a monophyletic group, and the taxonomy of O. bracteosus has remained stable over time. One study of chromosome numbers in genera closely related to Orthocarpus showed that O. bracteosus is the sole member of its genus with a haploid number n=15.
