= CBUVT =

Proposed CBC Television station in British Columbia, Canada

Victoria, British Columbia; Canada
- Channels: Analog: 10 (VHF)

Ownership
- Owner: Canadian Broadcasting Corporation

CBUVT was a proposed CBC Television station that would have operated in Victoria, British Columbia, Canada. The station was slated to operate on channel 10, the last VHF assignment in southwestern British Columbia, for which the Canadian Broadcasting Corporation (CBC), the provincial government, and commercial interests in Vancouver had all applied in the early 1970s. While a transmitter was built and construction on studios nearly completed, a series of federal budget cuts in 1978 prevented the CBC from putting the station into service months before it was set to begin operating, prompting it to surrender the licence the next year. The unfinished studio building and channel 10 assignment were later used for other television ventures in the region, and Victoria would not have a second locally-based television station until CIVI-TV signed on in 2001.

== 1973 application ==
In 1956, the Department of Transport reserved channel 10 in Victoria for use by the CBC. However, in 1972, the Canadian Radio and Television Commission (CRTC) announced that it would take applications for third stations to serve communities that could support them, including Toronto, Edmonton and Vancouver.

By the early 1970s, Victoria was the only provincial capital in Canada that lacked a CBC-owned radio or television station. With a filing deadline before the CRTC pending, the CBC tendered an application for a CBC television station to serve Victoria on January 19, 1973. At the same time, three applicants—Chako Broadcasting Ltd.; Great Pacific Industries Ltd., owned by Jim Pattison; and West Coast Broadcasting Ltd.—filed to build stations in Vancouver. The CBC application contemplated hiring 35 staff and producing five hourlong newscasts per week. BCTV, the owner of Victoria's private CBC (and secondary CTV) affiliate CHEK-TV, supported the application and noted that, were it to be granted, CHEK would become a full CTV affiliate in line with its sister across Boundary Bay, CHAN-TV in Vancouver.

The significance of Victoria as the capital city of British Columbia must be more fully recognized. ... The CRTC expects that the establishment of a CBC owned and operated TV station to serve Victoria, with suitable retransmission facilities ... will be the first step in this direction.

— CRTC decision denying the 1973 CBC application

The CRTC rejected all of the channel 10 applications, including that of the CBC, on August 10, 1973. The CBC did not impress the commission with its programming plans, while the board deemed that the Vancouver applicants failed to "adequately reflect the potential of a rapidly growing city". While rejecting the application, the CRTC endorsed "without reservation" the CBC's plans to establish a television station in Victoria and called on the CBC to build such a facility in order to aid recognition of Victoria as the provincial capital.

The channel 10 allocation continued to be of interest after the CRTC dismissed all of the 1973 applications. A 1974 provincial government report written by Barrie Clark, a former Liberal Member of the Legislative Assembly, suggested the establishment of a B.C. Communications Authority to operate a province-wide television network with mandatory cable carriage. Clark's report also recommended that this authority apply immediately for a channel 10 licence.

== Fending off commercial applicants ==
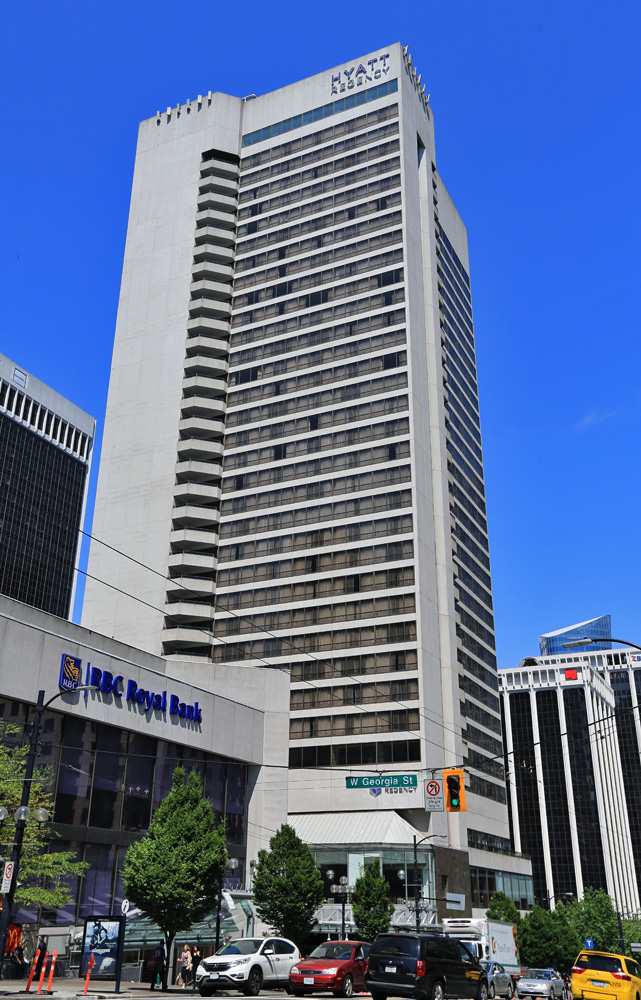
At the CRTC's April 1975 hearings held at the Hyatt Regency Vancouver (pictured in 2015), the CBC argued against the applications to use channel 10 commercially in Vancouver

In October 1974, the CRTC announced it would begin taking applications again for channel 10 as a commercial station in Vancouver. The provincial government—hoping to bypass the commission—wrote communications minister Gerard Pelletier in an attempt to have the federal cabinet reserve channel 10 for use by the province.

Even with its application pending, the CBC entered into discussions with the city of Victoria about its plans, which included not only a television station but a CBC Radio station carrying the AM network on the FM band. In television, the CBC proposed 15 hours a week of local productions. Additionally, the Crown corporation entered into an agreement to buy for $500,000 a parcel of city-owned land on Blanshard Road, on which it would build a two-storey, 36,000-square-foot (3,300 m^{2}) radio and television production centre.

The provincial government remained rather unsupportive. In March, transport minister Bob Strachan declared that it would only throw its weight behind the CBC application if the corporation granted prime time slots for educational content. The province did not end up applying itself, though it expressed disappointment at the failure of the federal government to reserve the channel for a noncommercial use; while Ottawa had suggested developing educational television on the UHF band, the province thought such channels too expensive and inadequate to reach viewers. On March 19, 1975, the CBC announced its intention to apply for channel 10 in Victoria and oppose the various commercial applicants for channel 10 in Vancouver.

The CRTC's call for bids returned four different applications for new commercial stations in Vancouver. Two sought channel 10 alone. Ten Television Ltd. had been originally owned by Doug Davis, a former Conservative political candidate, but the application was transferred to Allarcom, owner of CITV in Edmonton. Pacific Rim Broadcasting Ltd. was owned by Vancouver developer Graham Dawson. Channel Seventy-Nine Limited of Toronto applied exclusively for a UHF assignment on channel 26. Western Approaches Ltd. submitted two proposals: one for channel 10 and another for channel 26, in the event the former was not available. An additional application not considered by the CRTC, from airline pilot William Kyryluk, proposed the use of a low-glare television screen that he had developed.

With teachers' petitions to not assign a third commercial channel to Vancouver making headlines, the CRTC convened in Vancouver for days of hearings on April 22, 1975. However, the CBC proposal loomed over the entire channel 10 proceeding; as a headline in the Vancouver Sun warned, "CBC could still win TV sweepstakes". The CBC plans had been beefed up from those presented in 1973, with triple the budget for local programming. The CBC presented studies showing that channel 10 was the only VHF allocation available to adequately serve Vancouver Island and that a UHF assignment would not provide the same coverage or accessibility.

In July, the commission opted not to award any of the Vancouver channel 10 applications and declared Western Approaches the winner for channel 26; at the same time, it accepted the CBC Victoria application, which now had provincial backing. (The CBC had already expressed a desire to start a French-language TV station on channel 26 at Vancouver; as a result, Western Approaches was instead approved to use channel 21 for its CKVU-TV.)

== The CBC wins ==
The CRTC's refusal to accept any of the channel 10 applications for Vancouver cleared the way for the CBC to pursue the channel in Victoria. In March 1976, the CBC once more went before the commission, this time to argue for its proposal, which included seven and a half hours a week of local programming and would bring full CBC service to Vancouver Island where CHEK only broadcast 40 hours of network programs weekly. To avoid duplication of programs with CBC television station CBUT in Vancouver, the corporation proposed to air network morning programs in the afternoon and vice versa. BCTV again supported the CBC application, though it asked that all Vancouver Island transmitters be signed on at the same time and that the CRTC place restrictions on commercial advertising to protect CHEK. Pacific Rim Broadcasting and Ten Television—two of the losing applicants from the 1974 Vancouver proceeding—opposed, with Ten proposing the substitution of channels 3 and 13 for CBC service on Vancouver Island. Liberal MP Simma Holt of Vancouver Kingsway opposed the bid as well, over duplication of what she called "mediocre" CBC output on the Lower Mainland.

The CBC now turned to the task of constructing its facilities. The corporation engaged the Bastion Group, a local architectural firm, to design a studio building on the plot of land at Blanshard and Kings; the facility was estimated to cost $6.7 million, plus another $2 million to commission the transmitter facility at Saturna Island. In August 1978, the CRTC approved an application from the CBC to establish repeaters for the CBC network, likely through CBUVT, at Sooke and Mount Macdonald.

== Budget cuts and cancellation ==
So we're not talking about simply postponing what we'd like to do—we're faced with the necessity of deep surgery in the CBC's services.

— CBC President Al Johnson

When Prime Minister Pierre Trudeau announced a series of federal budget cuts in August 1978, the CBC was not immune. Al Johnson, the corporation's president, called the budget cuts—which cancelled a planned $71 million increase for the next fiscal year—"savage" and warned they would affect planned expansions in regional programming.

The order to cut funds came with the CBC Victoria facilities "almost complete". On September 6, Johnson announced that CBUVT would not open on November 30 as planned, though construction work on the studio was set to continue. The decision also required CHEK to stay with the CBC; meanwhile, Don MacPherson, head of the CBC English-language television and radio operations, emphasized that it was a delay, not a permanent cancellation. One group pleased by news of the CBC Victoria delay was the Association of Lower Mainland Cable Operators. As CBUVT would have been required for carriage on Vancouver-area cable systems on channel 10, it would have required the relocation of community television services on that channel to another unimpaired channel, channel 5, in turn displacing Seattle's KING-TV to a channel that required a converter to view.

On October 24, less than two months after the CBC announcement, the CRTC held licence hearings for CBUVT and CHEK-TV; in announcing the hearing, it warned that it expected information from the CBC as to its plans for Vancouver Island. In the lead-up to the hearing, BCTV and CKVU both made proposals to run channel 10. Daryl Duke, owner of Western Approaches and CKVU, noted that the Victoria studio building was "only months, if that, from going on the air".

In a decision published on January 26, 1979, the CRTC allowed the CBC to begin operating the Saturna Island transmitter as a rebroadcaster of CBUT at reduced power; the corporation said it would do so beginning March 31. The operation at reduced power meant that the new station would not require KING-TV to be moved by Lower Mainland cable systems, and the CRTC stated that full-power operation would require the Victoria studios to be operational. The CBUVT licence itself was renewed for another year, to March 31, 1980.

CBC regional manager Len Lauk officially announced on June 15, 1979, that the CBUVT project had been permanently cancelled. Instead of the 50-person radio and television operation initially envisioned, the CBC would build only the radio station, employing 12, but would accelerate its construction. A $3 million outlay on the studios and Saturna Island transmitter had already been committed to a project that was now shelved. The CBC proceeded to surrender the unused CBUVT licence.

== After CBUVT ==
=== The CBC in Victoria ===
While the CBC pledged to continue its radio plans in the wake of the cancellation of CBUVT, progress was slow to come. In 1989, the CBC received final approval to set up a CBC Stereo rebroadcaster of CBU-FM Vancouver. Advocates for public broadcasting in Victoria deemed the decision a "partial victory". Transmitters in Victoria and Sooke/Metchosin were activated on October 16, 1989. As late as 1995, the CBC's presence in town consisted of just three employees; when Premier Mike Harcourt announced his resignation at the legislature with just 30 minutes' notice to the news media, the CBC was not able to dispatch a crew to cover the event and had to rely on footage provided by CKVU.

It would be nearly another decade after the launch of the CBC Stereo transmitter before the corporation set up a local talk radio station in Victoria. On November 20, 1997, the CRTC approved the corporation's application to build a CBC Radio One station on 90.5 MHz. CBCV-FM began broadcasting September 28, 1998; the CBC set up studios on Pandora Avenue for the new radio operation.

In July 1980, the CRTC approved a licence amendment that allowed CHEK-TV to drop CBC programming and become a full-time CTV affiliate beginning in January 1981.

=== The Kings Road studio ===
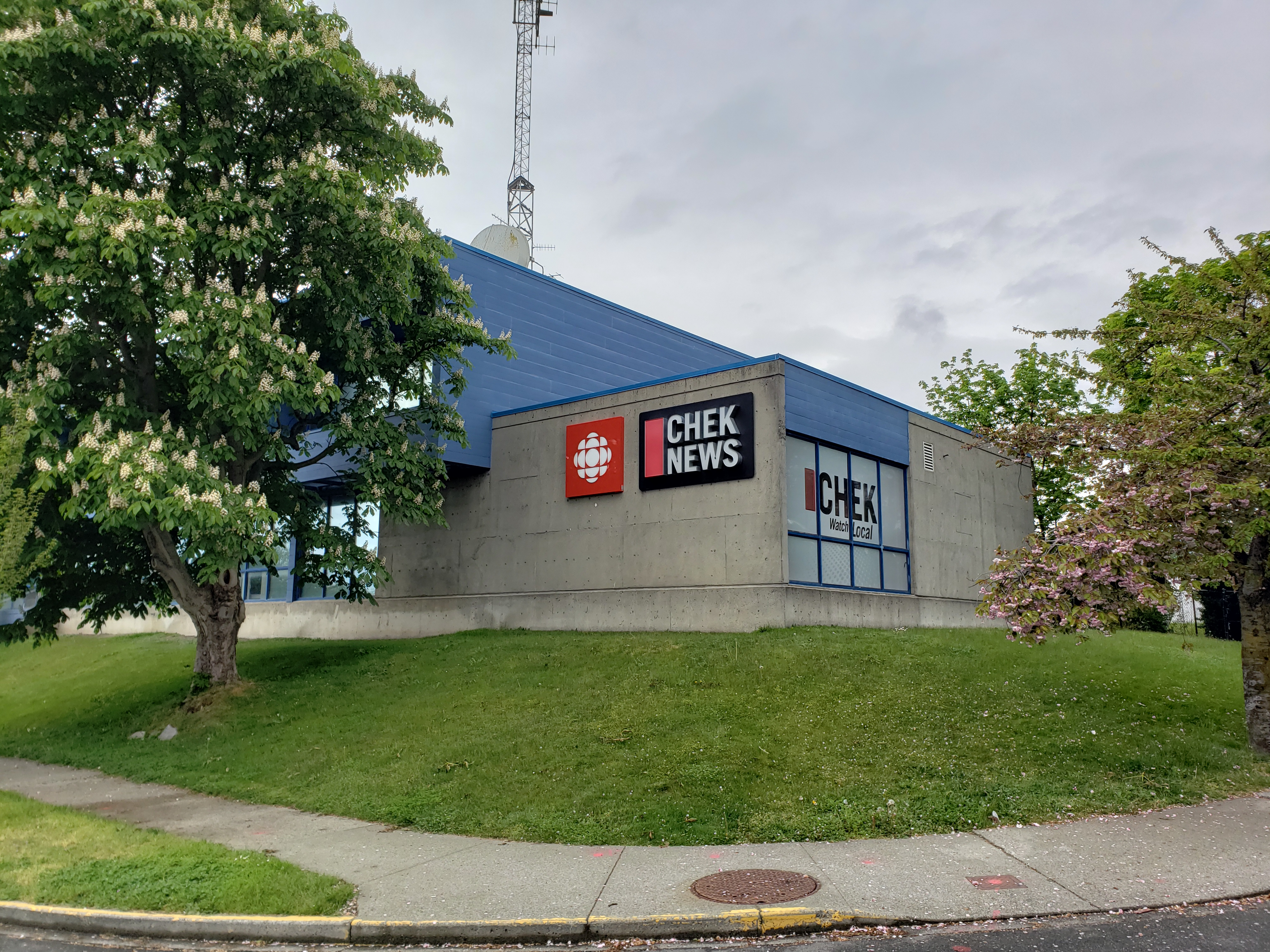
After selling the unfinished studio building to CHEK-TV, the CBC moved its Victoria radio studios there in 2012

Without a television or radio station in Victoria, the CBC faced a problem in disposing of the partially constructed studio facility, which remained empty for several years and suffered vandalism. The mayor of Victoria suggested the building be adapted for use as a regional police headquarters. A tenant was finally identified in 1982 when the University of Victoria entered into a lease to house its new engineering school there, with a planned 1984 opening date. The university could not put the financing together to renovate and finish the interior, prompting it to end the lease on March 31, 1983.

In September 1983, CHEK-TV completed a deal with the CBC to buy the building, after the CBC had rejected a previous bid in 1980. CHEK invested $3 million to finish and equip the building and moved in a year later. In 2012, the CBC announced that it would lease space from CHEK to relocate its Victoria radio studios, marking the first time the CBC had occupied the building it had abandoned 34 years earlier.

=== Channel 10 ===
Channel 10 remained in high demand by various interests after the CBC abandoned its own plans. The highest-profile was a Victoria group known as CFRE Public Television, which in 1980 proposed a commercial-free, member-supported outlet and use of the unfinished Kings Road studio.

In 1984, Western Approaches—which had been one of the parties to the channel 10 proceeding a decade earlier—applied to move CKVU-TV from channel 21 to channel 10. Concerns arose over the potential of a stronger channel 10 signal—which would extend service to 183,000 additional people—to overwhelm cable and antenna receiving equipment aimed at Seattle and KCTS-TV on channel 9, particularly because the cable receiving site that provided this service to much of the Lower Mainland was colocated with the CKVU transmitter on Saltspring Island. The CRTC approved the channel change in February 1985 on the condition that CKVU give cable systems time to modify their receiving setups; CKVU moved to channel 10 on September 6, 1986, bringing the channel to use in southwestern British Columbia more than a decade after the original applications for it were made.
