= CKVU-DT =

Television station in Vancouver

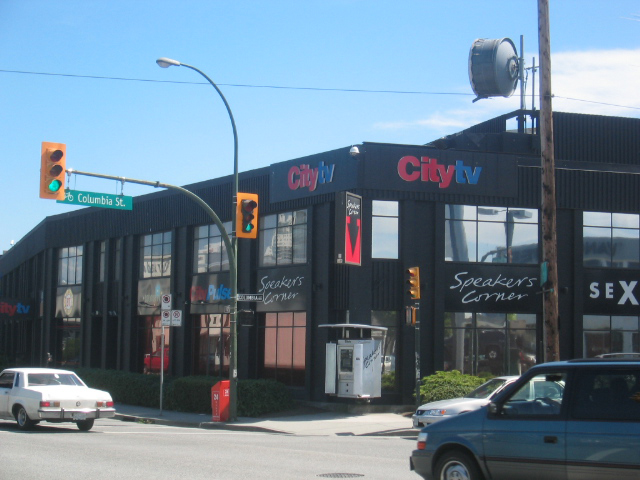
- CKVU's studios at 180 West 2nd Avenue in Vancouver.
- Vancouver, British Columbia; Canada
- Channels: Digital: 33 (UHF); Virtual: 10
- Branding: Citytv Vancouver (general); CityNews Vancouver (newscasts)

Programming
- Affiliations: 10.1: Citytv

Ownership
- Owner: Rogers Sports & Media; (Rogers Media Inc.)
- Sister stations: TV: CHNM-DT, Sportsnet Pacific; Radio: CJAX-FM, CKKS-FM

History
- First air date: September 1, 1976
- Former call signs: CKVU-TV (1976–2011)
- Former channel numbers: Analog: 10 (VHF, 1986–2011), 21 (UHF, 1976–1986); Digital: 47 (UHF, 2010–2011)
- Former affiliations: Independent (1976–1997, 2001–2002); Global (1997–2001)
- Call sign meaning: Vancouver UHF (refers to original UHF allocation for analog signal and current UHF allocation for digital signal)

Technical information
- Licensing authority: CRTC
- ERP: 8.3 kW
- HAAT: 670 m (2,200 ft)
- Transmitter coordinates: 49°21′13″N 122°57′24″W
- Translator(s): see § Transmitters

Links
- Website: www.citytv.com

CKVU-DT (channel 10, cable channel 13) is a television station in Vancouver, British Columbia, Canada, serving as the West Coast flagship of the Citytv network, a division of Rogers Sports & Media. It is sister to Omni Television outlet CHNM-DT (channel 42). The two stations share studios at the corner of West 2nd Avenue and Columbia Street (near False Creek) in the Mount Pleasant neighbourhood of Vancouver; CKVU-DT's transmitter is located atop Mount Seymour in the district municipality of North Vancouver, with its studio to transmitter link facilities on the roof of the Century Plaza Hotel in Downtown Vancouver.

The station went on the air on September 1, 1976 as CKVU-TV by Western Approaches Ltd., with Canwest first entered the station in 1979 by providing emergency financing to founding owner Western Approaches to fend off a takeover attempt by Allarcom. Under Canwest's ownership, the station shifted from UHF channel 21 to VHF channel 10 in 1986, which they acquired full 100% ownership of CKVU in 1988 after years of legal and regulatory disputes before the station was rebranded as U.TV in 1990, and officially took on the Global Television Network brand in 1997 as its owned-and-operated West Coast outlet. Its local identity was overwhelmingly defined by its pioneering sports news division, led by its flagship late-night highlights program, Sports Page.

After Canwest acquired the broadcasting assets of Western International Communications in 2000 along with the purchase of CHAN-TV, it sold off CKVU to CHUM Limited in 2001 and relaunched under the Citytv brand on July 22, 2002. Because of poor ratings in its newscasts, CHUM Limited laid off its newsgathering team in July 2006 before they were acquired by CTVglobemedia in 2007; but CTVgm had to sell off the stations due to conflicts with CTV stations it already owned in Citytv's markets. CTV chose to retain the stations of CHUM's secondary A-Channel system, but divested CKVU and its sister stations to Rogers Media. Shortly after being acquired by Rogers, CKVU's programming became more conventional in nature, while eliminating newscasts outside of Breakfast Television in 2010, but the evening newscasts were restored in 2017 and the local version of BT was cancelled in 2020.

== Early years and Canwest ==
=== Origins ===
CKVU's history dates back to 1975 when Western Approaches Ltd. was awarded the third television station licence in the Vancouver market by the Canadian Radio-television and Telecommunications Commission (CRTC). Western Approaches—which had, unlike the other applicants, filed for both channel 10 and 26—had emerged from a chaotic proceeding in which the CRTC did not award the main channel 10 allocation in deference to the CBC's plan to use it for a television station in Victoria; that station would never launch because of budget cuts in 1978. The station was originally assigned to broadcast on UHF channel 26, but it was instead given channel 21 prior to its launch. (The CBC was already planning on using channel 26 to launch Radio-Canada station CBUFT.) The station first signed on the air on September 1, 1976; it was the first station in Vancouver to transmit on the UHF band. In addition, CKVU was carried on cable channel 13, an assignment it retains to this day. In its first year of operation, CKVU lost more than $3 million. By 1978, the station was profiting off simultaneous substitution of US shows, attracting a cable audience four to five times larger than the over-the-air footprint.

In 1979, the station was approaching the break-even point. It was also under the scrutiny of the CRTC at that time due to its lack of local programming. According to the CRTC, CKVU did not produce its own newscasts but instead relayed the Ontario-focused newscasts from the Global Television Network. That same year, Charles Allard, owner of CITV in Edmonton, purchased a 5% common stock and 7% preferred stock interest in CKVU through his company, Allarcom. Canwest Pacific, a subsidiary of CanWest Broadcasting, loaned $4 million to Western Approaches so it could thwart a takeover attempt from Allarcom. Three years later, CanWest loaned another $8 million to Western Approaches to reduce the station's debt with the condition that CanWest would have the option to purchase Western Approaches' shares in CKVU.

=== Canwest Global ===
In 1984, Western Approaches applied to move CKVU-TV from channel 21 to channel 10, which remained vacant after the CBC Victoria plans fell through. Concerns arose over the potential of a stronger channel 10 signal—which would extend service to 183,000 additional people—to overwhelm cable and antenna receiving equipment aimed at Seattle and KCTS-TV on channel 9, particularly because the cable receiving site was colocated with the CKVU transmitter on Salt Spring Island. The CRTC approved the channel change in February 1985 on the condition that CKVU give cable systems time to modify their receiving setups; CKVU moved to channel 10 on September 6, 1986, bringing the channel to use in southwestern British Columbia more than a decade after the original applications for it were made. Until it was shut down on August 31, 2011, as part of Canada's digital television transition, CKVU's analog signal, which transmitted from a very high location on Salt Spring Island, could be received throughout much of southwest British Columbia and northwest Washington, as well as in some areas of northern Seattle. This analog transmitter was replaced with two UHF transmitters serving Vancouver and Victoria, both with reduced coverage areas overall, but with improved coverage to those particular metropolitan areas. CKVU also maintained a rebroadcast transmitter located west of Courtenay, CKVU-TV-1, which is received over-the-air on North Vancouver Island.

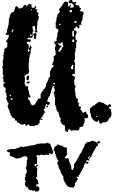
U.TV logo, used from 1990 to 1997. The station's newscasts were known as U.News during this period. For the logo used while as Global, refer to the Global Television Network article.

On December 6, 1985, CanWest announced that it had purchased controlling interest in CKVU, subject to CRTC approval. Western Approaches went to court in an attempt to block the sale, which resulted in a dispute between Western Approaches, Allarcom, and Canwest that lasted several years. On June 19, 1987, the Supreme Court of British Columbia ordered Western Approaches to sell its interest in CKVU to Canwest, subject to CRTC approval. Once the sale was approved and all other legal issues were settled, CanWest gained 100% ownership and control of CKVU. It then began sharing programs with CanWest's other independent stations, as well as the Global network in Ontario. In 1990, CKVU and Canwest's other independent stations became known as the "Canwest Global System".

Under CanWest's ownership, the station was rebranded as "U.TV", and its audience and profits increased. The station had previously been branded as both "CKVU-13" and "VU13" (both referring to the station's cable channel) and more simply, the "CKVU" call letters. On Monday August 18, 1997, Canwest dropped the more localized brandings from all of its stations and generically rebranded them as the Global Television Network, as part of a full expansion of the network outside of Ontario to the Canwest Global System stations. Accordingly, after seven years under the "U.TV" brand, CKVU rebranded simply as Global.

=== Sale to CHUM Limited ===
"We can get rid of this baby!" CKVU's former weather presenter Joe Leary takes the Global mike flag off his microphone on the station's last day as a Global O&O.

In 2000, Canwest acquired the television interests of Western International Communications, including CHAN-TV (channel 8) in Vancouver and CHEK-TV (channel 6) in Victoria. The CRTC approved the purchase on July 6, 2000, on the condition that Canwest divest CKVU. The CRTC further approved the transfer of CKVU to a Canwest subsidiary, CKVU Sub Inc., on December 21, placing the station in a blind trust while the company looked for a buyer. Indeed, Canwest had bought WIC's television interests specifically to increase its reach in British Columbia. CHAN (long known in the province under its "BCTV" brand) had been the dominant station in British Columbia for the better part of the last 30 years and boasted over 100 transmitters across the province. In contrast, CKVU operated only three transmitters covering only the southwest quadrant of British Columbia.

CHUM Limited applied to the CRTC to acquire CKVU Sub Inc. on July 26, 2001 for $175 million, with the intention of making it a Citytv station, using a similar format as the company's flagship station, CITY-TV in Toronto. CHUM planned on spending $8.03 million on British Columbia-based independent productions, $5.95 million on local news and information programming, and $1.37 million on local culture, social policy, and talent development over a period of seven years.

During its brief stint as an independent station from 2001 to 2002, the station was known as ckvu13, a reference to its callsign and its cable allocation in the Lower Mainland.

A large network shuffle occurred on September 1, when CHAN's contract with CTV expired. CHAN, now under Canwest ownership, switched affiliations from CTV to Global. As a result, CIVT (channel 32), an independent station owned by Baton Broadcasting, became a CTV owned-and-operated station, while CKVU was rebranded as "ckvu13". (Note: CHUM's application for a new Vancouver station in 1996 had been beaten by Baton's CIVT; when said station took the air, Citytv founder Moses Znaimer accused then-Baton head Ivan Fecan of stealing the Citytv format outright for CIVT; Fecan had previously worked for Znaimer during the 1970s and 80s, lending credence to the accusation.) While CKVU began airing CHUM-supplied programming immediately following the switch, the station remained in trust pending regulatory approval of the sale. CHUM gained CRTC approval for its acquisition of CKVU Sub Inc. on October 15, 2001. Because CHUM owned CIVI (channel 53) in Victoria, which was part of the "NewNet" system, the CRTC imposed its usual licence conditions for large-market twinsticks: CKVU was prohibited from airing more than 10% of the programming aired on CIVI, and newscasts were required to be separately managed.

== Citytv ==
=== Relaunch and news cuts ===
At 6 a.m. Pacific Time on July 22, 2002, CKVU dropped the "ckvu13" branding and became the second television station in Canada to use the Citytv brand (as "Citytv Vancouver"), effectively turning Citytv into a television system. A new morning program (Breakfast Television, based on the format originated on CITY-TV) was launched immediately after the rebrand, and the station's 6 and 11 p.m. newscasts were rebranded as CityPulse on the same day.

Despite high expectations that the intensely local, unconventional urban format would replicate the success of flagship station in Toronto, the station suffered from a severe news ratings failure. In the Vancouver market, CKVU's news ratings plummeted to a distant third place, trailing far behind market leaders BCTV (Global BC) and BC-CTV (CTV Vancouver). In August 2005, CHUM expanded the Citytv brand across Central Canada and renamed all local CityPulse broadcasts to CityNews in an attempt to harmonize the brand and boost struggling viewership. However, the ratings in Vancouver remained stagnant and failed to capture the broader local audience. On July 12, 2006, CHUM announced that it would dramatically reduce its newsgathering operations in Vancouver, as well as in several other cities. It laid off 195 part- and full-time employees, including 47 in Vancouver, who were abruptly escorted from the premises by security guards. While CKVU's evening news presence was dissolved entirely, the station's morning show, Breakfast Television, survived the cuts and was temporarily expanded from three hours to four to offset the loss of local daytime programming. In a coincidental development, that same day, BCE Inc., the parent company of Bell Globemedia (later known as CTVglobemedia and now Bell Media), which owns the CTV Television Network, announced it would buy CHUM Limited and its assets, including CKVU and the four other Citytv stations.

=== Rogers ownership ===
The acquisition of CHUM Limited by CTVglobemedia was approved by the CRTC on June 8, 2007, on the condition that CTVglobemedia sell off CHUM's Citytv stations (including CKVU) to another buyer due to the fact the company had CIVT in the same base as the station; Rogers Communications announced its intention to purchase the five Citytv stations three days later. The transaction was approved by the CRTC on September 28, and the acquisition by Rogers was finalized on October 31, 2007.

On October 25, 2008, a fire occurred at CKVU's rebroadcast transmitter site southwest of Courtenay, knocking the analog station's channel 5 over-the-air signal off the air; it has not broadcast since then and it was unknown if the station would replace the transmitter or simply delete it from its licence altogether. CBC Television O&O CBUT (channel 2) also operated a transmitter at the same site; it later filed an application to revoke the license for the transmitter at the Courtenay site, which the CRTC approved on October 12, 2011. This application noted that the decision had been made not to rebuild the transmission site, which was destroyed in the fire.

In December 2012, the Citytv system started to begin being referred to as "City Television" in on-air promotions, although the Citytv branding was still heavily used in promos and on on-screen logo bugs. At the same time, CKVU's (and the entire system's) website and on-air graphics phased in the "City" name, effectively rebranding the station as "City Vancouver". The new City branding was launched on Monday, December 31, 2012, coinciding with the City New Year's Bash broadcast. The Citytv name was reinstated in 2018.

CKVU celebrated its 50th anniversary on September 23, 2026.

== News operation ==
CKVU presently broadcasts 14 hours of locally produced newscasts each week, consisting of two hour-long nightly newscasts under the CityNews brand.

The station's news operation used a variety of branding over the years; it was known as First News (or 1st News) in the 1980s, and as U News for most of the 1990s (during this period, CKVU ran hourly news updates, using the 24-Hour News Source format then-popular in the United States). With the 1997 rebrand to Global, this meant U News became Global News. After the sale of the station and conversion to independent status, the temporary CKVU News name was adopted; this gave way to CityPulse with the station's relaunch as Citytv in July 2002. CityPulse became known as CityNews by 2005.

The station's news operations underwent significant changes in July 2006 following the announcement of Bell Globemedia's acquisition of CHUM Limited; CKVU's 6 and 11 p.m. evening newscasts were cancelled outright, while the station's morning show Breakfast Television was expanded from three hours to four.

On January 19, 2010, Rogers Communications announced that it was laying off six employees at CKVU. The layoffs also resulted in the cancellation of the locally produced programs Lunch Television and The CityNews List, while Breakfast Television was reduced from four hours back to three; the latter was eventually expanded to 3 1/2 hours in September 2011.

On June 5, 2017, Rogers announced that it would re-launch local 6 and 11 p.m. CityNews newscasts in Vancouver in early 2018, as part of a nationwide restoration of news programming to Citytv's owned-and-operated broadcast stations. The new programs launched on September 3, 2018.

On September 5, 2019, Rogers laid off four employees from CKVU and placed Breakfast Television on hiatus until September 23. At this time the program was relaunched with a new hybrid format, consisting of a mixture of local content with national entertainment and lifestyle segments produced from Toronto.

On November 17, 2020, Rogers Sports & Media imposed staff cuts across the country, including cancelling Breakfast Television in Vancouver.

=== Notable former on-air staff ===
- Monika Deol – anchor (2002–2003)
- Fiona Forbes – Breakfast Television (2002–2003)
- David Kincaid – anchor/reporter (1983–2004)
- Beverley Mahood – host (2003–2005)
- Jennifer Mather – anchor (1998–2002)
- Kristina Matisic – reporter/anchor (1994–1999)
- Dan O'Toole – anchor/reporter (2001–2002)
- Simi Sara – Breakfast Television reporter/anchor/host of CityCooks (1993–2008)
- Jody Vance – (2012–2016) co-host/news anchor
- Anna Wallner – reporter/anchor (1994–1999)

== Technical information ==
=== Subchannel ===
Subchannel of CKVU-DT
Subchannel	Res.	Short name	Programming
10.1	1080i	CKVU-DT	Citytv

=== Analog-to-digital conversion ===
On February 23, 2010, the station received approval from the CRTC to broadcast its digital transmitter from Mount Seymour, rather than from its existing analog transmitter site on Saltspring Island. This transmitter improved signal coverage for the Vancouver and Fraser Valley areas, but reduced reception in Victoria. CKVU's digital signal first signed on the air on March 2, 2010.

CKVU shut down its analog signal, over VHF channel 10, on August 31, 2011, the official date on which Canadian television stations in CRTC-designated mandatory markets transitioned from analog to digital broadcasts. The station's digital signal was relocated from its pre-transition UHF channel 47 to post-transition channel 33 (which previously served as the pre-transition digital channel for Vancouver-based CTV O&O CIVT-DT). Digital television receivers display CKVU-DT's virtual channel as its analog-era VHF channel 10.

CKVU improved its digital signal coverage on August 31, 2011, by broadcasting from a new transmitter in Victoria, which had been approved by the CRTC. The Victoria and Mount Seymour digital transmitters replaced the majority of the coverage area previously covered by its channel 10 analog transmitter and improved coverage within the Vancouver and Victoria metropolitan areas.

=== Transmitters ===
Station	City of licence	Transmitter type	Channel	ERP	HAAT	Transmitter coordinates
CKVU-DT-2	Victoria	Digital	27 (UHF); Virtual: 27	2.75 kW	99.6 m	48°25′30″N 123°20′13″W
CJWM-TV	Whistler	Analog	21 (UHF)	0.001 kW	N/A (1710.6m ASL)	50°7′18.84″N 123°1′26.4″W
