= CHBE-FM =

Radio station in Victoria, British Columbia

Coordinates: 48°25′17″N 123°30′40″W

- Victoria, British Columbia; Canada
- Broadcast area: Greater Victoria
- Frequency: 107.3 MHz (HD Radio)
- Branding: 107.3 Virgin Radio

Programming
- Format: Contemporary hit radio
- Subchannels: HD2: CFAX; HD3: Pure Country; HD4: iHeart New Music
- Affiliations: Premiere Networks

Ownership
- Owner: Bell Media; (Bell Media Regional Radio Partnership)
- Sister stations: CFAX, CIVI-DT

History
- First air date: May 26, 2000
- Former call signs: CFEX (2000–2004)

Technical information
- Class: B
- ERP: 20,000 watts horizontal polarization only
- HAAT: 142 metres (466 ft)

Links
- Webcast: Listen Live
- Website: virginradio.ca/victoria/

CHBE-FM (107.3 MHz) is a commercial radio station in Victoria, British Columbia. The station is owned by Bell Media and broadcasts a Contemporary hit radio format. The radio studios and offices are on Park Place in Esquimalt.

CHBE has an effective radiated power (ERP) of 20,000 watts horizontal polarization only. The transmitter is on Claudette Court in Victoria. CHBE broadcasts using HD Radio technology. The HD2 digital subchannel carries the talk format on co-owned CFAX. The HD3 subchannel airs Bell's national country music network "Pure Country." The HD4 subchannel airs "iHeart New Music".

== History ==
=== CFEX (2000–2004) ===
The station received approval in October 1999. It originally launched on May 26, 2000 as CFEX, a modern rock station branded as Extreme 107.3. The first song they played was "Kryptonite" by 3 Doors Down. It was owned by Seacoast Communications, which also owned CFAX in the city. On August 16, 2002, at 1:07 p.m., it changed to adult hits as B107.3.

=== Kool FM (2004–2019) ===
CFAX and CHBE were acquired by CHUM Limited in November 2004. On the 19th of that month, CHBE began playing all Christmas music. At midnight on December 26, CHBE changed to hot AC as 107.3 Kool FM, bringing back the format since CHTT-FM flipped to adult hits in January that year. Kool's first song was The Black Eyed Peas' Let's Get It Started.

CHUM Ltd., in turn, was purchased on June 22, 2007 by CTVglobemedia, which now owns CFAX, CHBE and CIVI-TV in Victoria. Months later, CTVglobemedia would acquire CFBT-FM in Vancouver, with CHBE shifting to Top 40/CHR. The shift to top 40 proved unsuccessful, and around August 2010, songs from the 1980s and 1990s were phased back in the playlist, bringing the station back to hot AC.

The station placed 3rd in the Spring 2012 BBM Ratings for Victoria.

In its final rating survey as "Kool", the radio station placed 6th for the fall 2018 Numeris Diary Survey for Victoria.

=== Virgin Radio (2019–present) ===
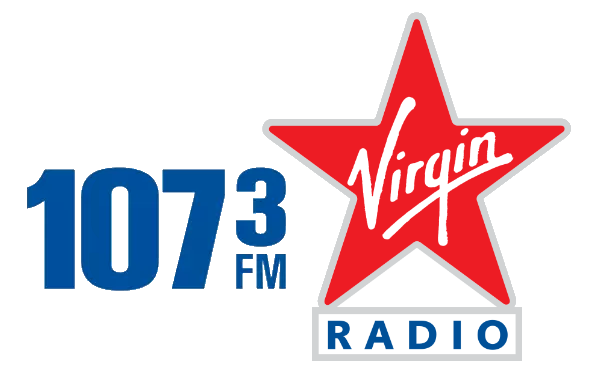
First "Virgin" logo (2019)

On February 8, 2019, the station re-branded as 107.3 Virgin Radio. The last song played on "Kool" was "Thank U, Next" by Ariana Grande, while the first song on "Virgin" was "High Hopes" by Panic! At the Disco.
