= Race Rocks Ecological Reserve =

Nature reserve in British Columbia, Canada

- IUCN category Ia (strict nature reserve)
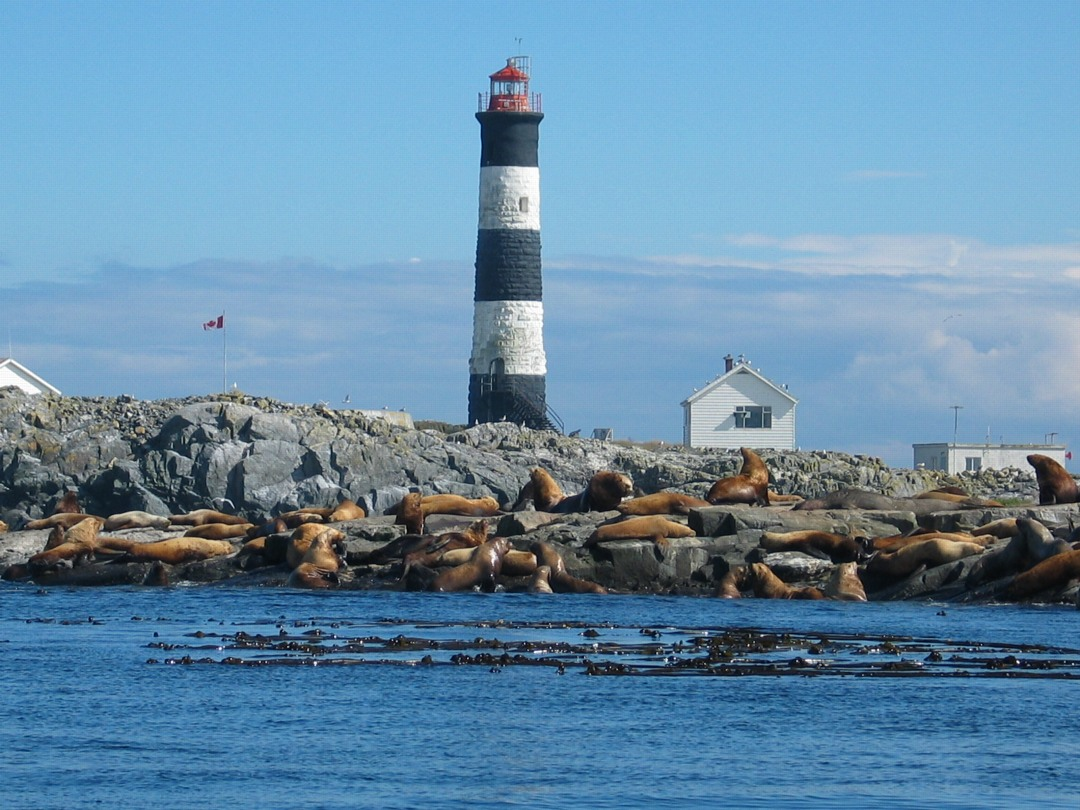
- Race Rocks Light

- Location within British Columbia Location within Vancouver Island Location within Capital Regional District
- Location: Juan de Fuca Electoral Area, Capital Regional District, British Columbia, Canada
- Nearest city: Metchosin
- Coordinates: 48°17′56″N 123°31′52″W
- Area: 227 ha (560 acres)
- Designation: Ecological Reserve
- Established: 1980
- Governing body: BC Parks
- Website: Race Rocks Ecological Reserve | BC Parks

Race Rocks Ecological Reserve is a BC Parks ecological reserve 1.5 kilometres (0.93 mi) off the southern tip of Vancouver Island in the Strait of Juan de Fuca in Juan de Fuca Electoral Area, Capital Regional District, British Columbia, Canada.

== Description ==
Located at a narrow part of the strait, the area covers 2.27 km^{2} (0.88 sq mi) of which only 0.02 km^{2} (0.0077 sq mi) is land covering 11 islets. It does not include the small envelope of land with the foghorn and the historic Race Rocks Lighthouse on Great Race Rock. That area is leased by the Canadian Coast Guard.

Because of the location in a high tidal current area, there is an exceptional variety of marine life to be found, including marine mammals, sea birds, fish, marine invertebrates, and marine algae and sea grass. It is a haul-out area for the California sea lion (Zalophus californianus) and Steller sea lion (Eumetopias jubatus) and a birthing rookery for harbour seals (Phoca vitulina) and it is also the most northerly birthing colony on the Pacific coast of North America for the elephant seal (Mirounga angustirostris).

== History ==
The idea of protecting Race Rocks came about following a marine science project by the students of Pearson College UWC under the supervision and guidance of their teachers, Garry Fletcher and Marks McAvity, in 1978. They described an area of great biodiversity and ecological importance. In 1980, the rocks and surrounding areas were protected as an ecological reserve under joint BC Parks–Pearson College UWC management.

In 2006 and 2007, the Race Rocks Tidal Power Demonstration Project was installed. After a six-year period for experimental research, the tidal energy generator was removed.

== See also ==
- Race Rocks Light
- Pearson College UWC
- Race Rocks Tidal Power Demonstration Project
- Trial Islands Ecological Reserve
