= Barbara Slade =

British screenwriter

- Born: Los Angeles, California, USA
- Occupations: Writer, screenwriter, creator, development executive

Barbara Slade is a TV screenwriter, creator and executive producer. Born in Los Angeles, California, she now lives in London and works with channels and production companies to develop shows for the international market.

== Career ==
Barbara (both a British and U.S. citizen) began her screenwriting career in London when her first show “Brown Bear’s Wedding” starring Helena Bonham Carter, Joss Ackland and Hugh Laurie aired on ITV, Christmas Day. It sold to most major territories, and was nominated for five Emmy awards including ‘Best Writer’. Barbara returned to the USA where she continued her career, writing and developing series for Nickelodeon, Disney, ABC, Fox and many other networks worldwide. She has written features for Working Title and Disney and has received numerous awards and was a finalist for the Humanitas prize for one of her episodes of ‘Rugrats’.

Barbara was brought on as a development executive for the Disney Channel UK and was lead writer on NRK's prime time award-winning comedy series 'Side by Side', now in its 10th season.

Barbara was Creator/Executive Producer on several original TV series including 'Dead Gorgeous' (CBBC/ABC/Nickelodeon), 'Hi Opie' (TVO/Netflix) and is now working exclusively in comedy-drama. Two of her original shows, 'Heaven is a Perfect Tomato' and 'A Drop of DNA', are currently being pitched.

Barbara's specialty is writing, developing and heading up high concept television shows for the international market. She regularly works with production companies and channels around the world and leads intensive screenwriting and development workshops.

== Television credits ==
Title	Role	Year	Network/Production Company
Buddi	Head Writer/Developer	2020	Netflix
Side by Side (Side om side)	Series Developer/Writing Lead	2013-2015	
Magnus	Series Developer	2019	
Alle Sammen Sammen	Series Developer	2014	
Hi Opie!	Creator/Executive Producer	2014-2015	TVOKids, Knowledge Network, City Saskatchewan, Netflix, Yippee TV
Alexander and Pete	Creator/Executive Producer	2012	TV Movie
Dead Gorgeous	Creator/Associate Producer	2010	ABC1, CBBC
Freefonix	Series Developer/Head Writer	2008-2009	BBC1, CBBC
Inbox	Writer/Producer		
Angelina Ballerina	Series Developer/Head Writer	2001-2006	ITV, CITV
My Teen Genie	Series Developer/Head Writer	2002	
Comin' Atcha	Series Developer/Head Writer	1999-2000	ITV, CITV
Eloise	Series Developer/Head Writer		
Rotten Ralph	Series Developer/Head Writer	1996	Nickelodeon, CBBC, Fox Family Channel
Rugrats	Writer (multiple episodes)	1994-1998	Nickelodeon
The Legends of Treasure Island	Series Developer/Head Writer	1993-1995	ABC TV Network, ITV, CITV
Sonic the Hedgehog	Writer (multiple episodes)	1993	ABC
The Legend of Prince Valiant	Writer (multiple episodes)	1993	The Family Channel
Little Shop	Writer (multiple episodes)	1991	Fox Kids, La Cinq
Tales from the Cryptkeeper	Writer (multiple episodes)	1991	ABC, Teletoon, CBS
Bill and Ted's Excellent Adventures	Writer - S2.E7	1991	CBS

== Filmography ==
- Winnie the Pooh: Stories from the Hundred-Acre Wood - Writer
- Winnie the Pooh: Seasons of Giving - Writer
- Angelina Ballerina: Angelina Sets Sail - Writer
- Brown Bear's Wedding - Writer
- White Bear's Secret - Writer
- The Snow Queen - Writer

== Awards ==
- 1992 Nominated for 'Best Writer' Emmy Award - 'Brown Bear's Wedding'
- 1995 Nominated for Humanitas Award - 'Rugrats': 'I remember Melville'
- 1996 Silver Honour Award - 'Rotten Ralph'
- 1997 Best Animated Series for Children' Cartoons-on-the-Bay (Italy) - 'Rotten Ralph'
- 1997 Silver Apple Award - 'Rotten Ralph'
- 2000 Nominated for Bafta Award for 'Best Animated Series' - 'Rotten Ralph'
- 2001 Nominated for Bafta Award for 'Best Animated Series' - 'Rotten Ralph'
- 2002 Nominated for Bafta Award for Best Animated Series - 'Angelina Ballerina'
- 2002 Nominated for Annecy Animation Festival 'Rose Fairy Princess Award'
- 2002 Silver World Medal for Children's Programs at New York Festival
- 2006 British Animation Awards Finalist for Children's Choice - 'Angelina Sets Sail'
- 2006 Oppenheim Platinum Award for best video - 'Angelina Sets Sail'
- 2010 Nominated for ' Best Children's Television Drama' at Australian Film Institute Awards - 'Dead Gorgeous'

== Sources ==
- Barbara Slade at IMDb
- Barbara Slade at LinkedIn
- Barbara Slade at MUBI
- Barbara Slade at Owlet Press
