= Trial Islands Lighthouse =

Heritage-designated lighthouse near Victoria, BC

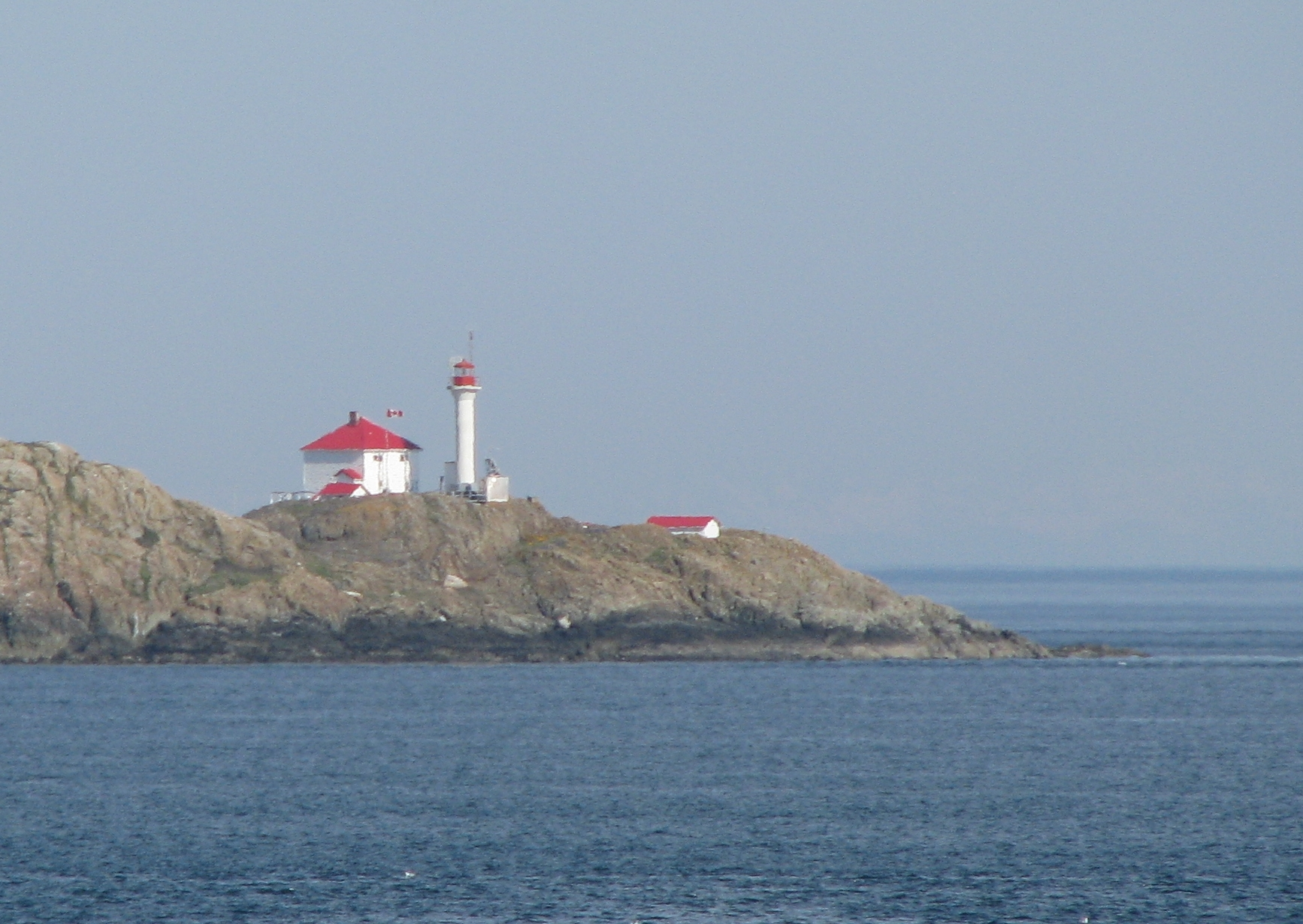
- Lightstation as seen from Clover Point in Victoria, May 2009
- Location: Oak Bay; British Columbia; Canada
- Coordinates: 48°23′42.4″N 123°18′18.7″W

Tower
- Constructed: October 1906 (first); 1970 (current)
- Construction: reinforced concrete tower
- Automated: Staffed by two full-time lightkeepers
- Height: 13 metres (43 ft)
- Shape: cylindrical tower with balcony and lantern
- Markings: white tower, red balcony and lantern
- Operator: Canadian Coast Guard
- Heritage: heritage lighthouse

Light
- First lit: 1970 (current)
- Focal height: 28.3 metres (93 ft)
- Lens: 4th order Fresnel lens (1906–1970) flash (1970–present)
- Range: 13 kilometres (7.0 nmi)
- Characteristic: Fl G 5s.

The major Trial Island is home to the Trial Islands Lighthouse which is operated by the Canadian Coast Guard, and continues to be staffed by two full-time lightkeepers. The current lighthouse was erected in 1970 to replace the original lighthouse that was constructed in 1906. The fourth order Fresnel lens from 1906 was used until it was replaced in 1970. That original lens was on display courtesy of the Maritime Museum of British Columbia in Bastion Square in Downtown Victoria, but was later moved into storage with the Coast Guard.

== Staffing ==
In September 2009 it was announced that the Trial Island Lighthouse would be automated to cut staffing costs. However, in 2012, the Minister for Fisheries and Oceans Canada, Keith Ashfield, said in response to the Senate study Seeing the Light: Report on Staffed Lighthouses in Newfoundland and Labrador and British Columbia that lighthouses currently staffed would remain so, and that the government had no plans to further study lighthouse staffing.

== Heritage designation ==
Tlikwaynung or Trial Island (British Columbia, Canada)

The Oak Bay Heritage Foundation proposed Trial Island Lighthouse for protection through the Heritage Lighthouse Protection Act. Community support including stories and comments are gathered through the Friends of Trial Island Facebook page https://www.facebook.com/trialislandlighthouse Trial Island Lighthouse is Victoria's landmark lighthouse. In 2015, thanks to the work of the Oak Bay Heritage Foundation and strong public support, it was announced that Trial Island Lighthouse had been granted heritage status. Parks Canada cites as character-defining elements of the Trial Islands Lighthouse its prominent location in the Strait of Juan de Fuca, its structural form, and its balanced proportions.

== See also ==
- List of lighthouses in British Columbia
- List of lighthouses in Canada
