= Simi Sara =

Simi Sara is a Canadian radio and television broadcaster, currently a talk radio host on CKNW in Vancouver, British Columbia. She succeeded Christy Clark as the station's afternoon host after Clark left the station to re-enter politics as the Premier of British Columbia.

Prior to joining CKNW, Sara was associated with CKVU-TV, including stints as a host of Breakfast Television and CityCooks, and with talk radio station CFUN before it flipped to its current sports format.

Sara was also a panelist on the 2010 edition of CBC Radio's Canada Reads, advocating for Marina Endicott's novel Good to a Fault.
