= Trial Islands Ecological Reserve =

Nature reserve on the Trial Islands in the British Columbia province of Canada

Coordinates: 48°23′53″N 123°18′20″W

Tlikwaynung or Trial Island (British Columbia, Canada)

The Trial Islands Ecological Reserve is a nature reserve on the Trial Islands in the British Columbia province of Canada just off the southern tip of Oak Bay in the Strait of Juan de Fuca. The twenty-three-hectare ecological reserve was established in 1990 to protect two elongated rocky islands and associated islets. It protects the greatest number of endangered and vulnerable species in a single ecological reserve in British Columbia.

== Flora and fauna ==
Flora on the reserve include great and common camas and stands of wind-adapted Garry oaks that cover the island. Endangered or threatened plants include the white-top aster, paintbrush owl-clover, golden paintbrush, creeping wild rye, rosy owl-clover, California buttercup, snake-root sanicle, purple sanicle, and Scouler's campion. This is the most northern limit of their range for many of these species. Nine plant communities have been described, including the red-listed Garry oak-California brome association.

The Trial Islands provide roosting sites for cormorants, black oystercatchers, diving ducks, gulls, eagles, raptors, and shorebirds, as well as haul-out sites for sea lions and seals.

== See also ==
- Race Rocks Ecological Reserve
