= Hi Opie! =

Canadian preschool TV show

- Genre: Children's
- Created by: Barbara Slade
- Written by: Kate Barris; Miklos Perlus; Eric Curtin; Patrick Granleese; Diana Moore; John Slama; Barbara Slade; Hayley Solman; James Backshall; Anthony Teles; Andrew Mullins; Lawrence S. Mirkin; Michael T. Foley; Dave Dias
- Directed by: Phil McCordic (season 1); Lowell Dean (season 2); Jason Hopley (season 2); Lawrence S. Mirkin (season 2); Wayne Moss (season 2)
- Starring: Jordan Lockhart
- Composer: Angelo Oddi
- Countries of origin: Canada; United States
- Original language: English
- No. of seasons: 2
- No. of episodes: 26 (78 segments)

Production
- Executive producers: Mark J.W. Bishop; Matt Hornburg; Barbara Slade; Marie McCann; Halle Stanford
- Producers: Larry Mirkin; Patricia Ellingson; Kate Barris; Miklos Perlus; Lowell Dean; Sharon Summerling; Marie McCann; Halle Stanford; Barbara Slade
- Editor: Mark Achtenberg
- Running time: 7 minutes
- Production companies: marblemedia The Jim Henson Company

Original release
- Network: TVO; Knowledge Network; City Saskatchewan
- Release: 1 September 2014 – 25 September 2015

Hi Opie! is a Canadian preschool show that premiered on September 1, 2014 on TVOKids and also airs on Knowledge Network and City Saskatchewan.

The series was renewed in 2015 for a second season. Season 2 began airing September 7, 2015 on TVO and City. It premiered on Knowledge Network on September 28, 2015.

The first season was formerly available on Netflix in North America. As of July 2025, the series is featured on the Yippee TV streaming service.

== Plot ==
Hi Opie! is a live-action preschool series that follows the social, emotional and intellectual escapades of 5-year-old Opie, a puppet who is the "new kid" in a kindergarten class. Each story contains a simple lesson about personal growth, with a focus on the process of learning through play. In March 2016, it was announced that a sequel series entitled Opie's Home began production in the summer of 2016 and was released in 2017.

== Awards ==
2015	YMA Awards of Excellence	Hi Opie! - Nominated, All Genres, Ages 3–5 Category	Nominated
2015	YMA Awards of Excellence	Hi Opie! - Winner, Best Convergent Website	Winner
2015	OVATION Awards	Hi Opie! - Winner, Merit Award for "Hi Opie!: Positioning TVO for Back-to-School Success	Winner
2015	Kidscreen Awards	Hi Opie! - Best Preschool Non-Animated or Mixed Series	Nominated
2015	iKids Award	Hi Opie! - Winner, Best Website Preschool)	Winner
2015	Golden Sheaf Awards	Hi Opie! - Nominated, Children's and Youth Production	Nominated
2015	ACE Awards	Hi Opie! - Bronze, Best Use of Media Relations Under $50,000 for "Back-to-School with Hi Opie!"	Bronze
2016	The Golden Sheaf Awards	Hi Opie! - Nominated, Children's and Youth Production	Nominated
2016	Prix Jeunesse	Hi Opie! - Finalist, Up to 6: Fiction	Finalist
2016	NHK Japan Prize	Hi Opie! - Finalist, Preschool	Finalist
2016	Canadian Screen Awards	Hi Opie! - Nominated, Best Pre-School Program or Series	Nominated
2016	Canadian Screen Awards	Hi Opie! - Nominated, Best Performance in a Children's or Youth Program or Series for Jordan Lockhart	Nominated
2017	Canadian Screen Awards	Hi Opie! - Jordan Lockhart - Nominated for Best Performance in a Children's or Youth Program	Nominated

== Episodes ==
=== Season 1 ===
No. overall	No. in season	Title	Written by
1	1	"Opie the Special Helper"	Kate Barris
2	2	"Opie Tidies Up"	Kate Barris
3	3	"Opie Can't Decide"	Kate Barris
4	4	"A Special Show and Tell"	Miklos Perlus
5	5	"Opie Makes Music"	Kate Barris
6	6	"Opie's Monster Day"	Kate Barris
7	7	"Better Than a Bandage"	Miklos Perlus
8	8	"All by Myself"	Erin Curtin
9	9	"Opie's Rocket Fuel"	Erin Curtin
10	10	"Eco-Hero"	Miklos Perlus
11	11	"Opie Knows It All"	Miklos Perlus
12	12	"Backwards Day"	Diana Moore
13	13	"Opie's Other Half"	Diana Moore
14	14	"Opie's Trading Day"	Patrick Granleese
15	15	"Opie's Big Performance"	Patrick Granleese
16	16	"Opie's Gotta Go"	Kate Barris
17	17	"Stop Means Stop"	Kate Barris
18	18	"Anything I Can Do"	Miklos Perlus
19	19	"Opie Sorts It Out"	Kate Barris
20	20	"Not Ms. Doney"	Miklos Perlus
Special guest: Pay Chen
21	21	"Double Duty"	John Slama
22	22	"The World's First Friendship Hat"	Erin Curtin
23	23	"Corinne's Mom"	John Slama
24	24	"Opie's Hiccup Dance"	Hayley Solman
25	25	"Opie Tries Something New"	Erin Curtin
26	26	"Opie's Friend Benjamin"	Kate Barris
27	27	"The Case of the Sparkle Monster"	Miklos Perlus
28	28	"Leaves Count!"	Kate Barris
29	29	"Opie Makes a Match"	Patrick Granleese
30	30	"Opie Rocks (Special Guest: Jason Collett)"	Kate Barris
31	31	"Indoor Recess"	Patrick Granleese
32	32	"Opie's Restaurant"	Erin Curtin
33	33	"Next Store Neighbors"	Miklos Perlus
34	34	"Opie's Pirate Treasure"	Erin Curtin
35	35	"Dinosaurs for All"	Kate Barris
36	36	"Opie's Dilemma"	Kate Barris
37	37	"A Promise Is a Promise"	Kate Barris
38	38	"Opie Makes a Mistake"	Kate Barris
39	39	"Happily Ever After"	Miklos Perlus

=== Season 2 ===
No. overall	No. in season	Title	Directed by	Written by
40	1	"Opie's Favourite Thing"	Wayne Moss	Miklos Perlus
41	2	"No Peeking Opie"	Lawrence S. Mirkin	James R. Backshall
42	3	"Moving Blues"	Wayne Moss	Kate Barris
43	4	"Opie Treasure Hunt"	Wayne Moss	Anthony Teles and Andrew Mullins
44	5	"Being Opie"	Wayne Moss	Kate Barris
45	6	"Opie the Sandman"	Wayne Moss	Anthony Teles and Andrew Mullins
46	7	"Opie vs. the Volcano"	Wayne Moss	Erin Curtin
47	8	"Opie Out of Lunch"	Wayne Moss	Lawrence S. Mirkin
48	9	"Opie's Pet"	Jason Hopley	Kate Barris
49	10	"Brave Opie's"	Wayne Moss	Michael T. Foley
50	11	"Opie's Alien Teacher"	Lowell Dean	Lawrence S. Mirkin
51	12	"Cubby Clean Out"	Wayne Moss	Erin Curtin
52	13	"Opie's Lady Bug Friend"	Jason Hopley	Kate Barris
53	14	"Opie'Power"	Lowell Dean	Miklos Perlus
54	15	"Opie Keeps a Secret"	Jason Hopley	Michael T. Foley
55	16	"Opie's Game"	Wayne Moss	Kate Barris
56	17	"Sneezy Opie"	Wayne Moss	Anthony Teles and Andrew Mullins
57	18	"Opie's The Fastest"	Wayne Moss	Dave Dias
58	19	"Hide Opie"	Wayne Moss	Kate Barris
59	20	"Fire Drill Drill"	Wayne Moss	Miklos Perlus
60	21	"Opie's Mother Day Card"	Jason Hopley	James R. Backshall
61	22	"Opie The Reporter"	Wayne Moss	Michael T. Foley
62	23	"Opie's First Field Trip"	Wayne Moss	Kate Barris
63	24	"Everybody Loves a Winner"	Lawrence S. Mirkin	Miklos Perlus
64	25	"Just a Whisper"	Wayne Moss	Miklos Perlus
65	26	"Opie's Rules (Special Guest: Pay Chen)"	Wayne Moss	Kate Barris
66	27	"Baby Teacher"	Jason Hopley	Kate Barris
67	28	"Opie Gets Ideas"	Jason Hopley	James R. Backshall
68	29	"Opie's Not So Great Day"	Wayne Moss	Miklos Perlus
69	30	"Opie and the Magic Balloon"	Jason Hopley	James R. Backshall
70	31	"Opie Measures Up"	Wayne Moss	Kate Barris
71	32	"Opie Adds Music"	Jason Hopley	Kate Barris
72	33	"Reading Buddies are Awesome"	Wayne Moss	Miklos Perlus
73	34	"Opie Does Nothing"	Jason Hopley	Lawrence S. Mirkin
74	35	"Opie The Leader"	Wayne Moss	James R. Backshall
75	36	"Opie's Truth"	Wayne Moss	Kate Barris
76	37	"Opie The Borrower"	Jason Hopley	James R. Backshall
77	38	"Opie Gets The Silent Treatment"	Wayne Moss	Kate Barris
78	39	"Snow Day"	Wayne Moss	Kate Barris
