= Tim Bolen =

Canadian television host

Tim Bolen is a Canadian television personality.

A graduate of Brock University and Seneca College, he had stage acting roles in Toronto theatre in the early 2000s, including in productions of He Died with a Felafel in His Hand and The Bible: The Complete Word of God, before joining The Weather Network as an on-air weather presenter in 2006.

From 2009 to 2011 he hosted a weekly sports magazine show for Rogers TV, and in 2010 he joined CKXT as host of the entertainment magazine show Inside Jam. He was then briefly a weather presenter for CIII in 2011 before joining CHCH as co-host of Morning Live: First Edition; after the early edition was cancelled, he became a sports and adventure reporter for the primary Morning Live. In 2022 he succeeded Bob Cowan as co-host of Morning Live, until departing the program in January 2025.

On March 17, 2025, Bolen joined Citytv as a co-host of Breakfast Television.
