= Jon Ljungberg =

American TV personality and comedian

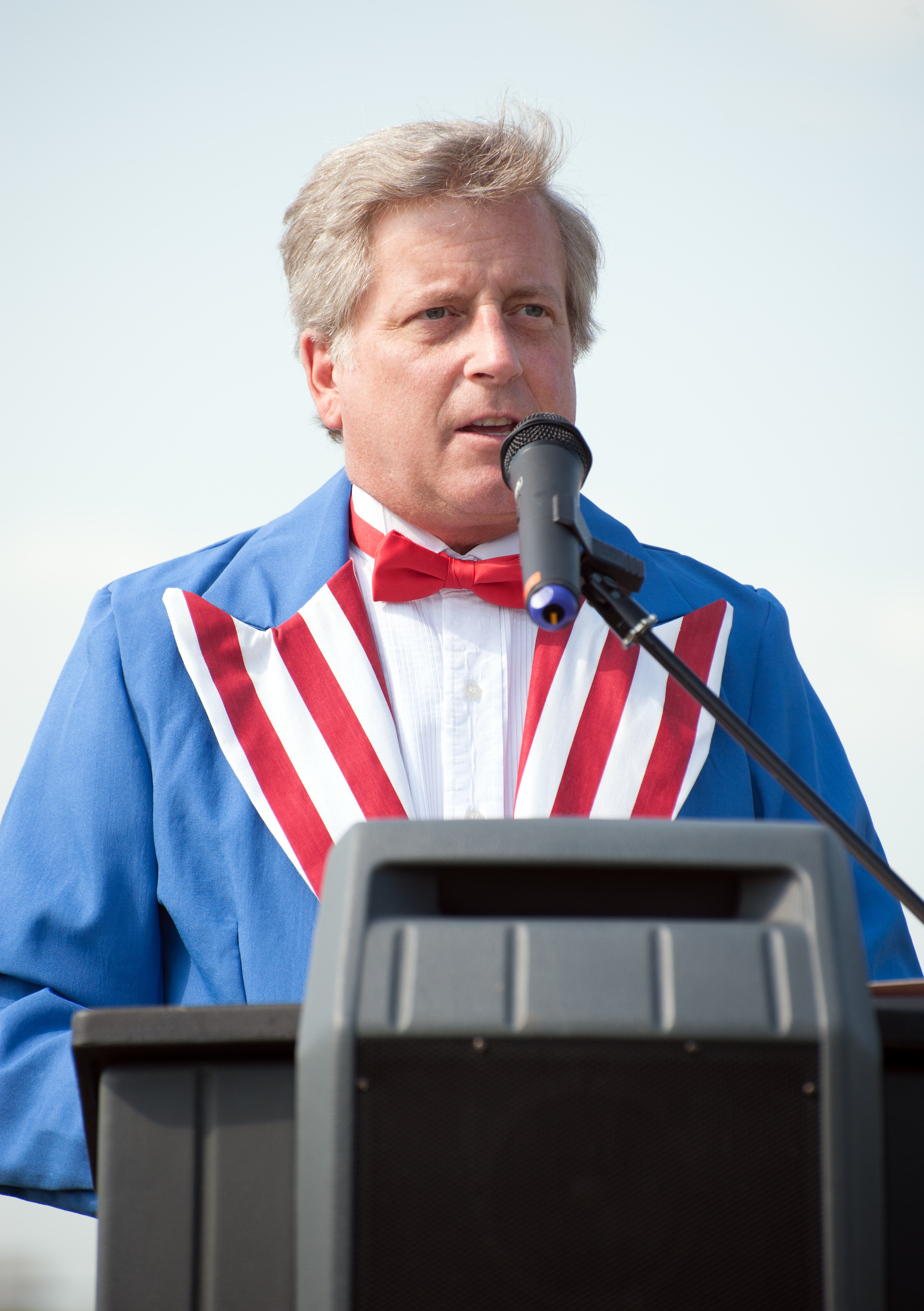
Ljungberg in 2013

Jon Ljungberg is a Winnipeg television personality and comedian, most known as the host of Breakfast Television (formerly The Big Breakfast), on Citytv Winnipeg.

Born in Worcester, Massachusetts, Ljungberg holds a Bachelor of Fine Arts Degree from Clark University.

Ljungberg has also done work on Fruit Pebbles advertisements, illustrated children's books, and does stand-up comedy. He is a big fan of the Boston Red Sox. He had a daughter, Brittney Ljungberg (1988), and a son, Christopher Ljungberg (1991) and was married twice.

Ljungberg, the cartoonist, has also contributed 10's of thousands of original cartoon compositions to the world of clipart for a variety of large stock image libraries.

He ended his career with Breakfast Television amicably in November 2010, and returned to television with the local community channel Shaw TV, as the host of The Peg This Week, running Sundays starting April 17, 2011.

In 2020, a judge sentenced Ljungberg to 6 months of house arrest and 50 hours of community service work, as a result of non-compliance with his bankruptcy trustee.
