= Race Rocks Tidal Power Demonstration Project =

Prototype turbine in British Columbia, Canada

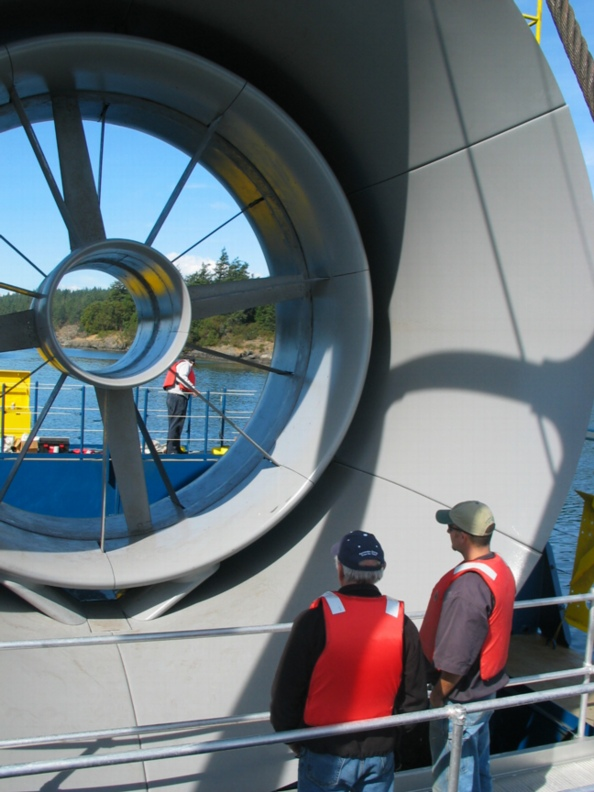
- The Race Rocks Tidal Current Generator before installation
- Race Rocks Tidal Power Demonstration Project, Race Rocks near Victoria, British Columbia
- Country: Canada
- Location: Race Rocks near Victoria, British Columbia
- Coordinates: 48.299°N 123.531°W
- Status: Decommissioned
- Commission date: 2006
- Decommission date: September 17, 2011
- Owners: joint project of Lester B. Pearson College, EnCana Corporation and Clean Current Power Systems Incorporated

The Race Rocks Tidal Power Demonstration Project (official name: Pearson College – EnCana – Clean Current Tidal Power Demonstration Project at Race Rocks) was a joint project of Lester B. Pearson College, EnCana Corporation and Clean Current Power Systems Incorporated to use tidal power at Race Rocks near Victoria, British Columbia in Canada. The Race Rocks tidal current generator was installed from July to September 2006 and it was planned to replace two diesel generators at Race Rocks Ecological Reserve. It was the first in-stream tidal current generator in North America.

The water lubricated bearing system did not perform as expected, and the prototype was decommissioned in May 2007, so that the bearing system could be redesigned. After changes to the bearings, shroud and turbine, Clean Current Power Systems reinstalled the unit on October 17, 2008. On September 17, 2011, the project ended when the turbine/generator was removed permanently.

The 65 kW direct drive variable speed permanent magnet generator with bi-directional ducted horizontal axis turbine was placed at a depth of 19 metres (62 ft) to 22 metres (72 ft).

== See also ==
- Race Rocks Ecological Reserve
- Pearson College UWC
- EnCana Corporation
