= CIVI-DT =

Television station in Victoria, British Columbia

- Victoria, British Columbia; Canada
- Channels: Digital: 23 (UHF); Virtual: 53
- Branding: CTV2 Vancouver Island (general); CTV News Vancouver Island (newscasts)

Programming
- Affiliations: 53.1/17.1: CTV2

Ownership
- Owner: Bell Media Inc.
- Sister stations: TV: CIVT-DT; Radio: CFAX, CHBE-FM

History
- First air date: October 4, 2001
- Former call signs: CIVI-TV (2001–2011)
- Former channel numbers: Analog: CIVI-TV: 53 (UHF, 2001–2011); CIVI-TV-2: 17 (UHF, 2001–2011)
- Former affiliations: Independent (NewNet) (2001–2005); A-Channel/A (2005–2011)
- Call sign meaning: Independent Television for Vancouver Island

Technical information
- Licensing authority: CRTC
- ERP: CIVI-DT: 1.5 kW; CIVI-DT-2: 35 kW
- HAAT: CIVI-DT: 99.6 m (327 ft); CIVI-DT-2: 634.3 m (2,081 ft)
- Transmitter coordinates: CIVI-DT: 48°25′30″N 123°20′13″W; CIVI-DT-2: 49°21′16″N 122°57′30″W
- Translator(s): CIVI-DT-2 17 Vancouver

Links
- Website: CTV2 Vancouver Island

CIVI-DT (channel 53) is a television station in Victoria, British Columbia, Canada. Part of the CTV2 system, it is owned and operated by Bell Media alongside Vancouver-based CTV station CIVT-DT (channel 32). Although the two stations nominally maintain separate operations, the Victoria station's newscasts have been produced from the CIVT-DT studios since 2023. CIVI-DT's offices are located at 503 Park Place in Esquimalt, adjacent to the Esquimalt Municipal Hall, and its transmitter is located on the roof of Camosack Manor near Rockland. The station operates a rebroadcaster (CIVI-DT-2) on virtual and UHF channel 17 in Vancouver, with transmitter atop Mount Seymour in the district municipality of North Vancouver.

== History ==
=== As The New VI ===
At the end of the 1990s, CHUM Limited only owned terrestrial television stations in the province of Ontario. Similarly, Craig Media only had stations in provinces within the Canadian Prairies. Both companies looked to expand their national presence, and both submitted a bid when the Canadian Radio-television and Telecommunications Commission (CRTC) issued a call for applications for a new television station licence in Victoria. CHUM was awarded the licence in 2000, and signed on CIVI on October 4, 2001, as the first original station to be part of the NewNet television system. The launch was a month behind the original schedule, and occurred amid a massive TV realignment in the Vancouver/Victoria market; the various changes also meant that CIVI displaced Bellingham, Washington's KVOS-TV from its long-time home on channel 12 on many Vancouver-area cable systems.

CIVI's studios, dubbed "Pandora's Box" for its location on Pandora Avenue, was designed by architect Francis Rattenbury and had previously been the home of the Brackman-Ker Milling Company and other uses over the years. CHUM spent over $20 million restoring it, including outfitting the building with the latest in technology and bringing it up to seismic standards.

CIVI logo used under "The New VI" brand, used from 2001 to 2005.

Known on the air as "The New VI", the station started off with much pomp and circumstance, marking its launch with a street party around its Victoria studios and its Nanaimo bureau. It boasted a large lineup of personalities, including former British Columbia New Democratic Party cabinet minister Moe Sihota. Original programming included Island Underground (focusing on Vancouver Island's youth culture), The New Canoe (hosted by and produced for the area's First Nations residents), Environ-Mental (focusing on localized environmental issues), the VI Parade (handling local arts and culture), and a localized version of Speaker's Corner. Much of the launch schedule consisted of programming from other CHUM outlets (including CityLine, FashionTelevision and Ed the Sock's Night Party), some of which had previously aired across the border on KVOS (which CHUM had been syndicating programming to since the 1990s in the face of repeated failures to launch a station in the area), along with American imported and syndicated programming (including The Tonight Show with Jay Leno and the Star Trek franchise), and a prime time movie on Sundays dubbed The Great MoVI (in the style of Citytv's Great Movies).

The station struggled to compete against CH owned-and-operated station CHEK-TV (channel 6, now an independent station), which had been the only local station on Vancouver Island for more than four decades. Gradually, personalities from the original roster were replaced by new faces, and some were let go without replacements. Not long after launch, CHUM purchased CKVU in Vancouver and converted it into the Citytv station for the region, meaning CIVI became part of a twinstick; as per CRTC regulations regarding twinsticks, CKVU was prohibited from airing more than 10% of the programming aired on CIVI, and newscasts were required to be separately managed.

=== As A-Channel Victoria ===
Logo used while as A-Channel, used from 2005 to 2008.

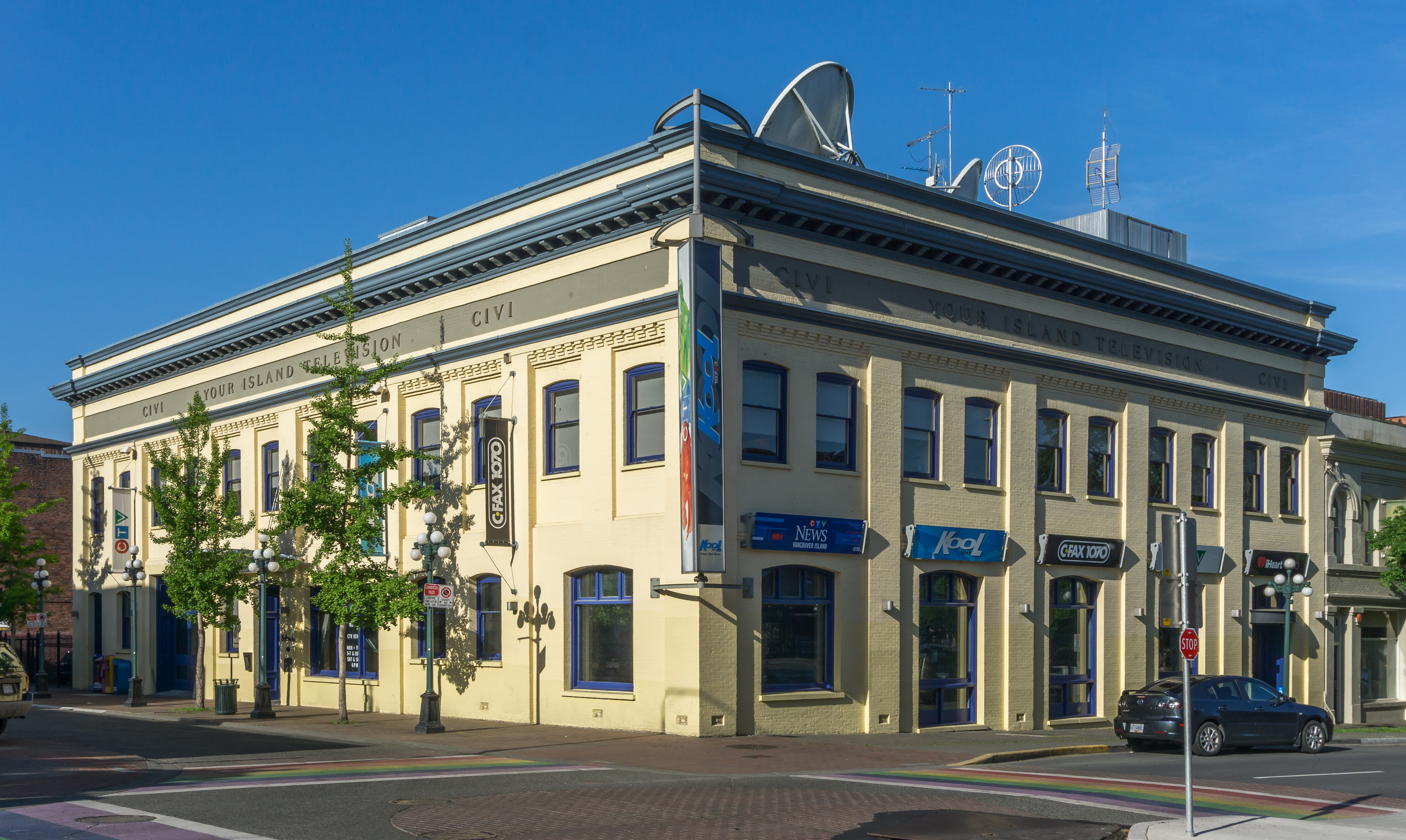
The station's studio building in Victoria. It used to be nicknamed "Pandora's Box" for its location at the corner of Broad Street and Pandora Avenue, just across the street from Victoria City Hall and McPherson Playhouse.

Following CHUM's purchase of Craig Media's broadcasting assets in 2004, the station was rebranded as "A-Channel" on August 2, 2005, along with the rest of the NewNet system. (The station would have been part of the original A-Channel system at its launch had Craig Media won the licence in 2000.) On July 12, 2006, CTVglobemedia announced plans to purchase CHUM Limited, with the intention of divesting the A-Channel stations. On that same day it was also announced that the morning news program A-Channel Morning would be discontinued, although this decision was supposedly unrelated to the takeover by CTVglobemedia (CIVI later restored a morning program to its schedule in the fall of 2007).

Rogers Communications announced a deal to buy A-Channel on April 9, 2007; however, given the conditions of approval for the sale of CHUM on June 8, 2007, Rogers acquired the Citytv system instead, while CTV kept A-Channel. CTVglobemedia became the official owner of CIVI on June 22, 2007.

=== As A Vancouver Island ===
Logo for A Vancouver Island (2008–2011)

The A-Channel system and Atlantic Canada's ASN were rebranded as A on August 11, 2008, with CIVI becoming "A Vancouver Island". As a result, CIVI's newscasts were rebranded as A News on that date, although the station's employees had been using that title for a couple of months prior to the relaunch; the station also began producing a morning newscast (under the title A Morning) on September 8, 2008, but was later cancelled on March 4, 2009, due to economic issues. The program was later replaced with a simulcast of the morning show from sister radio station CFAX (1070 AM).

=== CTV Two/CTV2 Vancouver Island ===
Logo used from 2011 to 2018

Bell Media announced on May 30, 2011, its intention to rebrand the A television stations to CTV Two that fall. On August 29, 2011, CIVI became "CTV Two Vancouver Island", and its newscasts were rebranded as CTV News.

Bell listed the Broad and Pandora studio building for sale in June 2024, with plans to relocate CIVI and its sister radio stations to Esquimalt.

== News operation ==
CIVI presently broadcasts two hours and 30 minutes of original newscasts each week, consisting of a thirty-minute local newscast each weekday at 4:30 p.m., anchored remotely from the Vancouver studios of co-owned CIVT. This newscast is repeated, potentially with minor modifications, at 6 p.m. and 11 p.m. (the latter being a 35-minute timeslot). There are no longer any weekend newscasts.

At launch, the station's newscast was dubbed VILand News (sister station CKVR had originally used a similar title, VRLand News, for its first few years as a NewNet station); the station's news anchors walked around the studio instead of sitting behind a desk, mimicking the format used at Toronto sister station CITY-TV and other NewNet outlets. VILand News consisted of a 90-minute long evening newscast from 5:30 to 7 p.m. and a half-hour late newscast at 11 p.m., as well as the two-hour morning newscast New Day (initially broadcast from the station's Nanaimo facilities with Bruce Williams). Weatherman and local folk musician Tony Latimer delivered his forecasts from his own sailboat, the Forbes and Cameron, which was equipped with an omni-directional microwave transmitter so he could broadcast from Victoria's Inner Harbour or other offshore locations.

To combat the station's low ratings, the evening news block was also repeatedly modified, being split into three different shows (VILand Live at 5:30, VILand Voices at 6 and VILand News at 6:30) in January 2002. In hopes of stemming the station's financial losses and low ratings, CHUM let go 29 employees in July 2004, and hired longtime CHEK anchor Hudson Mack as its new chief anchor and news director. The station's newscasts were re-formatted to target an older demographic, including a re-brand to VI News and the introduction of a desk for the anchors. The changes appeared to have been effective; while still trailing CHEK, the ratings gap between the two had narrowed.

Since Mack's arrival, the station has been honoured with a number of industry awards. In 2006, it received three Edward R. Murrow Awards from the Radio-Television News Directors Association International, for Best Newscast, Best Investigative Reporting and Best Sports Reporting. It was the second straight year the station won Murrows for its newscast and investigative reporting. In 2005, the station won eight industry awards, including two Edward R. Murrow Awards from RTNDA International, for Best Newscast and Best Investigative Reporting; and top news honours from the British Columbia Association of Broadcasters.

The station's weekend 6 p.m. newscasts were cancelled as of February 3, 2021, due to budget cuts made by Bell Media. In the wake of further cuts announced by Bell in 2023, the station replaced its early-evening newscasts with a single half-hour 4:30 p.m. newscast (repeated at 6 p.m.) on weekdays, anchored from Vancouver, effective June 19. The Times Colonist reported that this was the station's only remaining daily newscast.

=== Notable former on-air staff ===
- Moe Sihota – anchor, political commentator (2001–2004)

== Technical information ==
=== Subchannel ===
Subchannel of CIVI-DT
Channel	Res.	Short name	Programming
53.1; 17.1	1080i	CIVI	CTV2

==== Analog-to-digital conversion ====
CIVI shut down its analog signal, over UHF channel 53, on August 31, 2011, the official date on which Canadian television stations in CRTC-designated mandatory markets transitioned from analog to digital broadcasts. The station's digital signal remained on its pre-transition UHF channel 23, using virtual channel 53.
