= Fiona Forbes =

Canadian television personality

Fiona Forbes is a Canadian television personality who hosted the entertainment talk show Urban Rush on Shaw Cable and worked on CityTvs Breakfast Television. She currently hosts The Rush, in Vancouver. In 2002 she was the winner of a Leo Award, with her co-host Michael Eckford, for best variety show hosts.

Forbes has performed charity work for the Vancouver Library. She has a degree in history from the University of British Columbia.
