= Trial Islands (British Columbia) =

Island group in British Columbia, Canada

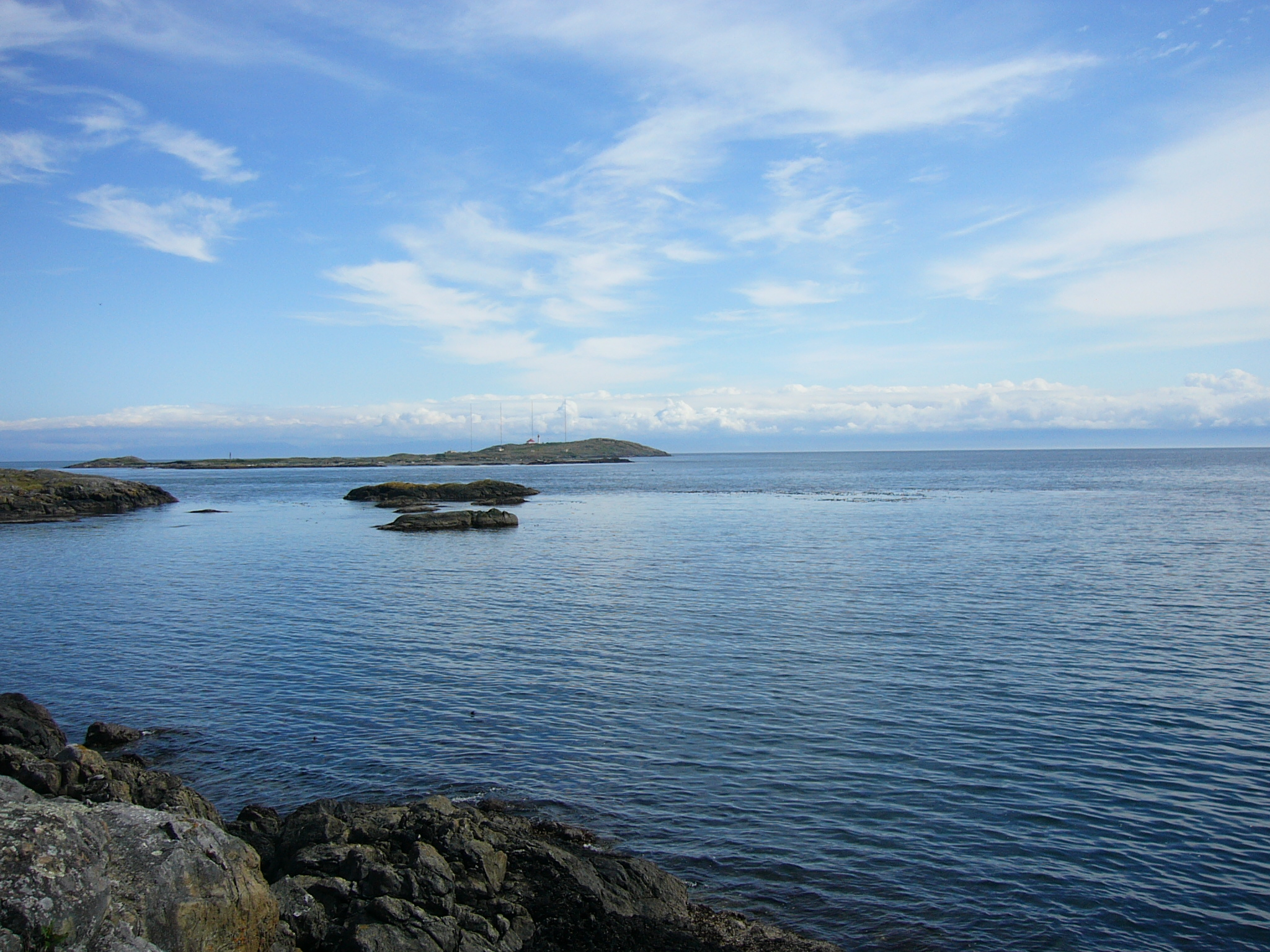
- The Trial Islands as seen from Beach Drive in Oak Bay.

- Location within British Columbia

Geography
- Location: Oak Bay & Victoria
- Coordinates: 48°23.9′N 123°18.3′W
- Archipelago: Trial Islands
- Total islands: 2+

Administration
- Canada
- Province: British Columbia

The Trial Islands are a group of islands located off the south-eastern tip of Vancouver Island off Victoria, part of the municipality of Oak Bay. The islands form the Trial Islands Ecological Reserve and entry outside designated zones is prohibited.

The island is home to the Trial Islands Lighthouse, and four large radio antennas operated under licence by CFAX 1070 AM radio.

== Name origin ==
It is likely that these islands were so named after the practise of sailing refitted British naval ships from the Esquimalt Royal Navy Dockyard to these islands and back as a trial run before heading into open seas. It has also been suggested that they were named because they constituted a trial of one's skill in navigation and seamanship. The trick was to round them in a small sailing ship and enter the Strait of Juan de Fuca, despite the frequent rip tides and the prevailing westerlies.

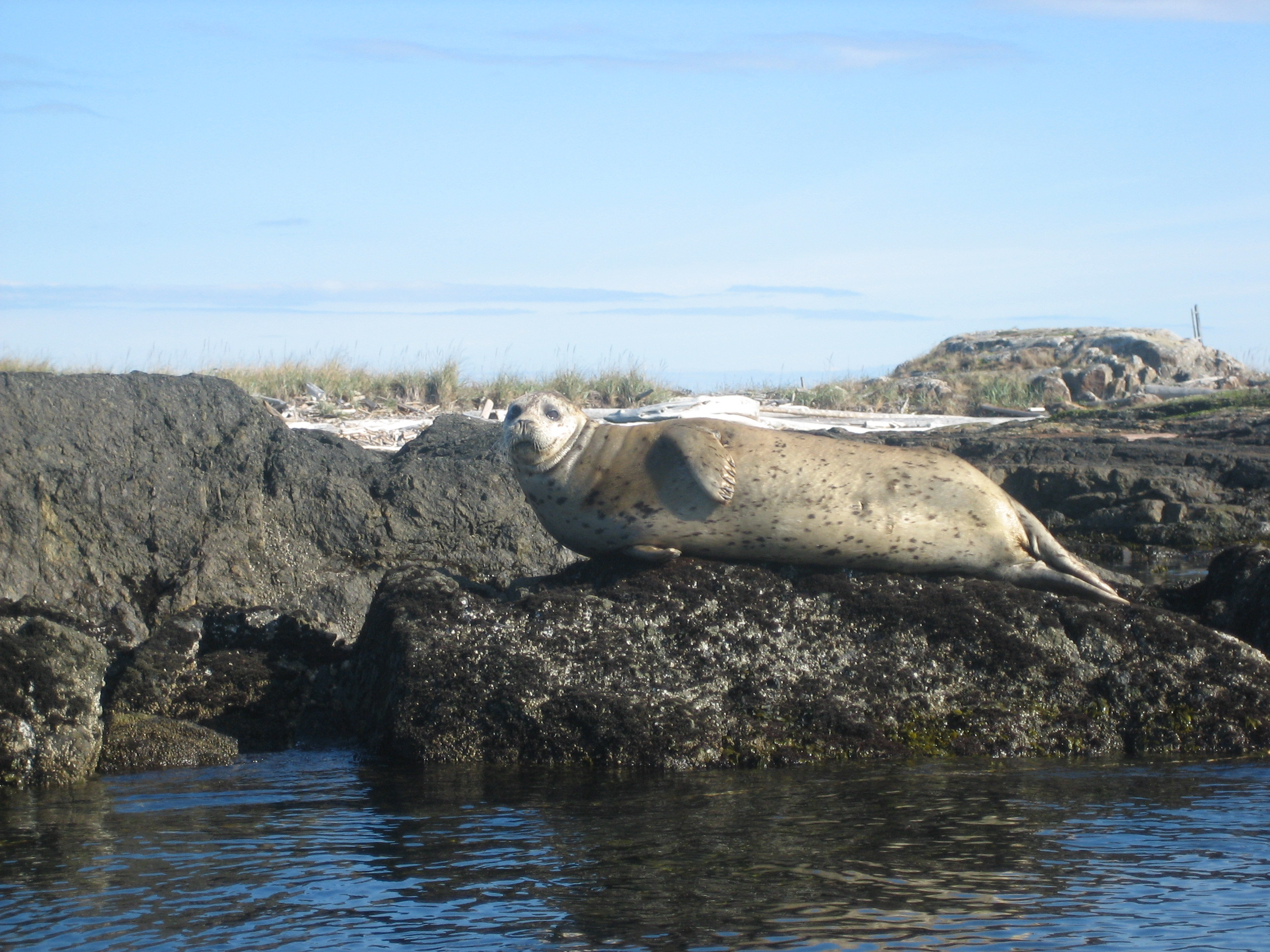
Seals frequent the shoreline of the Trial Islands.
