= CFAX =

Radio station in Victoria, British Columbia

Coordinates: 48°23′49″N 123°18′25″W

- Victoria, British Columbia; Canada
- Broadcast area: Greater Victoria
- Frequency: 1070 kHz
- Branding: CFAX 1070

Programming
- Format: News/Talk

Ownership
- Owner: Bell Media; (Bell Media Regional Radio Partnership)
- Sister stations: CHBE-FM, CIVI-DT

History
- First air date: September 11, 1959

Technical information
- Class: B
- Power: 10 kW
- Repeater: 107.3 CHBE-HD2 (Victoria)

Links
- Webcast: Listen Live
- Website: iheartradio.ca/cfax-1070

CFAX (1070 AM) is a news/talk radio station in Victoria, British Columbia, Canada. It was independently run until September 30, 2004, when it was taken over by Canadian media company CHUM Limited. Its sister station is CHBE-FM, which began broadcasting in 2000. It is now owned by Bell Media through its Bell Media Radio division.

The station moved into the same building as CIVI-TV, also owned by Bell Media, in March 2008. It is now located at Unit 500, 5th Floor, 503 Park Place Esquimalt BC. CFAX's transmitter is located on the Trial Islands.

The station placed 3rd in the fall 2018 Numeris Diary Survey for Victoria.

== History ==
CFAX signed on on September 11, 1959, as a daytime-only 1,000-watt radio station on 810 kHz, shutting down every night to accommodate clear-channel KGO. Its transmitter was at a site near Swan Lake. The original owner's group included the Queale family, who also owned the local Queale Electronics store. The station, undercapitalized from the beginning, quickly ran into financial trouble, with Clare Copeland emerging as owner and manager. In 1964, the station changed dial position to 1070, and commenced 24/7 operation, transmitting from the Trial Islands. In 1967, power was increased to 10,000 watts.

Clare Copeland sold the station in 1975 to Mel Cooper, who stepped down as general manager of CKNW Vancouver to assume ownership of CFAX.

Under Cooper's direction, the station increased its emphasis on news and information programming, and developed a subsidiary company specializing in recording original commercial jingles for sale throughout North America, and syndicating radio programming, "Seacoast Sound."

On June 22, 2007, CTVglobemedia became the owner of CFAX and sister stations CHBE-FM and CIVI-TV through its purchase of CHUM Limited, which had been approved by the CRTC on June 8.
