= Breakfast Television =

Canadian morning program television brand

- Genre: Morning show
- Presented by: Dina Pugliese; Tim Bolen
- Country of origin: Canada
- Original language: English

Production
- Production locations: 299 Queen Street West, Toronto (1989–2009); 33 Dundas Street East, Toronto (2009–2025); Rogers Building, Toronto (2025–present)
- Camera setup: Multi-camera
- Running time: 240 minutes
- Production company: Rogers Media

Original release
- Network: Citytv
- Release: September 5, 1989 – present

Breakfast Television (BT) is a Canadian morning television program that is broadcast by Citytv. First premiering in 1989, the program originated as the morning show of the network's original station CITY in Toronto. The program currently consists of a local segment for the Greater Toronto Area airing from 6:00 a.m. to 8:30 a.m. ET, which airs exclusively on Citytv Toronto. This is then followed by a national portion carried by most other Citytv stations (barring Citytv Saskatchewan, which does not air news programming due to its educational remits); in Toronto, this segment is carried from 8:30 a.m. to 10:00 a.m. ET, with scheduling varying in other markets.

The BT format and branding had also been franchised to local morning shows carried by other Citytv stations in Vancouver, Calgary, Winnipeg, Edmonton, Montreal, and the Atlantic Satellite Network (ASN)—which was owned by former Citytv parent company CHUM Limited (after the sale of CHUM to CTVglobemedia and resulting sale of Citytv to Rogers Media, ASN continued using the brand under license until 2011, when it rebranded as CTV Two Atlantic and the program was retitled CTV Morning Live). In the mid- and late-2010s, the local versions of BT began to either be cancelled or replaced by "hybrid" productions incorporating segments of national interest from the Toronto show. In 2020, the two remaining local versions in Calgary and Vancouver were cancelled by Rogers in preparation for the expansion of its national content.

== History ==
Former logo

Breakfast Television premiered on September 5, 1989 with co-hosts Ann Rohmer and David Onley, with MuchMusic VJ Steve Anthony broadcasting from a different spot around the area each day. Kevin Frankish handled news updates from the CityPulse (later CityNews) newsroom (he also handled the overnight updates broadcast from the assignment desk that flowed directly into BT). From 1995 to 2008, BT was simulcast on then-sister station CKVR in Barrie, with VRLand News inserts replacing the CityPulse/CityNews segments. Just as many people within the CityNews team started off on the CHUM phoneline, both Jennifer Valentyne and producer Kevin Forget started by working at "the BT Diner".

Co-host Liza Fromer quit her job at BT in July 2006, days after the birth of her child. Kevin Frankish has blogged that her departure from the show was "on the absolute best of terms". BT has encouraged people to send audition tapes for consideration. During the summer of 2006, a number of CHUM personalities were invited to guest co-host with Kevin Frankish in the search for the next permanent host. The guest hosts included CityNews sports anchor Kathryn Humphreys, health specialist Laura DiBattista, consumer specialist Jee-Yun-Lee, former Citytv weather specialist Nalini Sharma, former reporter Melissa Grelo, etalk correspondent Traci Melchor, BT's own Jennifer Valentyne, and Star!'s Dina Pugliese. On October 13, 2006, Dina Pugliese became the show's new co-host.

Every August since 2005, BT has organized a "Viewer Appreciation Day", held in the BT parking lot. Gates open at 6 a.m., and closed due to capacity crowds early into 7 a.m. Some people began camping out at BT at 5:30 p.m. the day before the 2006 Viewer Appreciation Day. Breakfast Television has also held other events, such as a successful world record attempt and a Christmas party. The BT Viewer Appreciation Day has since been canceled, with only the Christmas Party remaining.

In 2009, with the acquisition of Citytv by Rogers, Breakfast Television moved from 299 Queen Street West to Rogers' 33 Dundas Street East complex at Sankofa Square (then known as Yonge-Dundas Square).

On September 5, 2011, each of the local editions of Breakfast Television across all of the Citytv owned-and-operated stations began starting a half-hour earlier, running from 5:30–9 a.m. In April 2012, the Winnipeg edition reverted to the 6-9 a.m. runtime.

In January 2015, the Winnipeg version of the program was cancelled and replaced with a simulcast of the CITI-FM morning show. In September 2019, the Montreal version of the program was cancelled, while the Calgary and Vancouver versions were re-launched on September 23, 2019 using a "hybrid" format incorporating segments of national interest from the Toronto version. Meanwhile, the Toronto version celebrated its 30th anniversary.

In March 2020, amid the COVID-19 pandemic in Canada, Citytv announced that it would expand Breakfast Television to include a new national hour dedicated to coverage related to COVID-19. The hour would air live nationwide at 9 a.m. ET following the Toronto show, pre-empting an hour of BT in Calgary and Vancouver.

In July 2020, Roger Petersen announced that he would leave BT Toronto.

On November 17, 2020, Rogers announced that the local versions of BT in Calgary and Vancouver would be cancelled, as it planned to reformat the Toronto version to include more national content beginning in 2021.

On January 21, 2021, it was announced Sid Seixeiro of Sportsnet's Tim & Sid would become the new co-host of the program on March 10, 2021.

On February 15, 2023, Dina Pugliese announced her departure from BT, and her last show was on February 24, 2023. On September 5, 2023, Meredith Shaw joined BT to replace Pugliese.

In May 2024, Rogers cancelled Citytv's long-running lifestyle show CityLine, and announced that it would be replaced in September 2024 by BT with Tracy and Cheryl, an additional, lifestyle-oriented hour of Breakfast Television co-hosted by former CityLine and ET Canada hosts Tracy Moore and Cheryl Hickey. The new hour did not premiere in September, and the network announced in January 2025 that production would not proceed. On February 10, 2025, Citytv then announced that it had also released Sid Seixeiro and Meredith Shaw, citing a planned "evolution" of the show to be announced "in the coming weeks".

On March 17, 2025, after 16 years at 33 Dundas Street, Breakfast Television would re-locate to a new studio at the Rogers Building, and introduced new co-hosts in former CHCH Morning Live anchor Tim Bolen and—in a surprise announcement—the return of Dina Pugliese after a two-year break from the show. In March 2026, Steve Paikin joined Breakfast Television as a correspondent, hosting the daily segment "Paikin on Politics".

== On-air staff ==
=== Current ===
Anchors/hosts

- Dina Pugliese - Co-host
- Tim Bolen - Co-host
- Steve Paikin - News anchor and Political correspondent
- Tammie Sutherland - News anchor
- Caryn Ceolin - News reporter
- Rick Campanelli - Correspondent
- Stella Acquisto - Correspondent

=== Former ===
- Steve Anthony - Live Eye reporter 1989 to 1994 (co-host of CP24 Breakfast until 2018 and now head of media relations at Direct Global and Direct Coops)
- Hugh Burrill - Sports/early morning talk (later as sports reporter for CityNews and now with FAN 590)
- Frank Ferragine - weather reporter and retired to return to family horticulture business
- Kevin Frankish - Co-host from 1989 to 2018; now host of The Mental Health Podcast.
- Liza Fromer - Co-host from 2001 to 2006 (left following end of maternity leave and later host of The Morning Show on Global Toronto until late summer 2016; now MC and author)
- Cheryl Hickey - entertainment specialist
- Tracy Moore - Reporter/fill-in news anchor from 2005 to 2007 (host of CityLine 2008-2024)
- David Onley - News anchor from 1989 to 1994 (later became Lieutenant Governor of Ontario after he retired from broadcasting and died in 2023.)
- Ann Rohmer - Host from 1989 to 2001 (moved on to CP24 after sale to Bell, briefly retired 2015, former anchor with CP24 and now at 105.9 The Region (CFMS-FM))
- Jennifer Valentyne - Live Eye reporter from 1992 to April. 1, 2016 (now host of The Bachelor & Bachelorette Canada After Show on W Network and a co-host on Derringer in the Morning on Q107)
- Stephanie Henry - Traffic Reporter
- Sid Seixeiro - Co-host 2021-2025; former co-host and sportscaster with Tim & Friends
- Meredith Shaw - Co-host
- Sean Cowan - Reporter
- Melanie Ng - Entertainment; returned briefly but moved with family to Calgary
- Devo Brown - Entertainment

== Local versions ==
=== Vancouver edition ===
CKVU launched a local version of Breakfast Television in 2002. The original hosts of Breakfast Television were Michael Eckford and Fiona Forbes, then they were replaced by Shane Foxman and Beverley Mahood, and since 2005, Simi Sara and Dave Gerry hosted the program, but as of August 13, 2008, they were let go.

On January 19, 2010, the length of BT was shortened from four hours to three hours, and six employees laid off as a result of "severe financial issues" with the Citytv stations.

A new format for Breakfast Television debuted in September 2008, with a new traffic and TransLink reporter. As part of Rogers Media's May 3, 2012 renewal of its affiliation agreement with Jim Pattison Group-owned Citytv affiliates CKPG-TV/Prince George, CFJC-TV/Kamloops and CHAT-TV/Medicine Hat, the three stations will begin simulcasting the Vancouver edition of Breakfast Television on September 1, 2012 as part of an expansion of Citytv programming on the stations, which will follow the program grid of CKVU (with breakaways from the Vancouver program grid for their weekday evening and midday newscasts and other locally produced programs).

On September 5, 2019, Rogers laid off 4 employees from CKVU and placed Breakfast Television on hiatus until September 23. At this time the program was relaunched with a new hybrid format, consisting of a mixture of local content with national entertainment and lifestyle segments produced from Toronto.

On November 17, 2020, Rogers imposed staff cuts across the country, including cancelling Breakfast Television in Vancouver and Calgary.

Former presenters

- Tasha Chiu (2008–2008)
- Michael Eckford - Host (2002–2003), was at CKNW 980
- Fiona Forbes - Host (2002–2003), was at Shaw TV Vancouver
- Beverley Mahood - Host (2003–2005); was co-host of CMT Canada's flagship program, CMT Central)
- Simi Sara (2005–2008), now at Global News Radio 980 CKNW
- Jody Vance (2012–2016) - Co-host/news anchor, was at Roundhouse Radio
- Dawn Chubai (2004–2017) - Host (Trending, Live Eye, Weather)
- Riaz Meghji - Host (2008–2019)
- Kyle Donaldson - News anchor (2017–2020)
- Mary Cranston - News anchor (2019–2020)
- Greg Harper - Reporter/news anchor (2010–2020)
- Thor Diakow - Entertainment host/traffic (2005–2020)
- Russ Lacate - Weather (2011–2020)

=== Calgary edition ===
CHUM Limited purchased Craig Media in late 2004. The $265 million deal included, among other things, Craig's three A-Channel stations (CKAL-TV in Calgary, Alberta; CKEM-TV in Edmonton, Alberta and CHMI-TV in Winnipeg, Manitoba).

In February 2005, CHUM announced that the A-Channel stations would be relaunched as Citytv stations by that fall. The morning show on the original A-Channel stations, The Big Breakfast, was relaunched as Breakfast Television on August 2, 2005 alongside their re-branding as Citytv. The A-Channel brand was subsequently transferred to CHUM's NewNet stations, whose own morning programs were retitled A-Channel Morning.

As in Vancouver, Rogers made cuts to Breakfast Television in Calgary in September 2019, placing the program on hiatus and re-launching it on September 23 with the same, aforementioned format changes.

Former presenters

- Ross Hull - Live Eye reporter
- Dave Kelly - Main anchor (2005–2009)
- Mike McCourt - News anchor
- Jill Belland - Host

=== Winnipeg edition ===
CHMI-TV in Winnipeg, Manitoba produced a version of Breakfast Television from August 2, 2005 to January 6, 2015 - the station was purchased along with CKAL-DT in Calgary and CKEM-DT in Edmonton. The final hosts were Courtney Ketchen, Jeremy John, Jenna Khan and Drew Kozub. It was replaced with a simulcast of Wheeler in the Morning—the morning show of sister radio station CITI-FM—starting on January 12, 2015. Khan and Kozub were retained as co-hosts for news and entertainment segments shown during the program on television in place of music.

Former presenters

- Pay Chen - Host (2009–2011)
- Jon Ljungberg - Host (?-2010)
- Erin Selby - Host (2005–2007)

=== Atlantic Canada edition ===
From 1992 to 2011, the Atlantic Satellite Network (ASN) in Atlantic Canada, now known as CTV Two Atlantic, aired its own local version of BT. At the time of its launch, ASN and Citytv (Toronto) were both owned by CHUM Limited, and both channels had a similar overall movies-focused format. The Atlantic edition of BT was similar to the Toronto version, but with a greater emphasis on the culture of the region, as matters such as commuter traffic are typically less of a concern in Atlantic Canada.

ASN was acquired by Baton Broadcasting (predecessor of the present-day Bell Media) in 1997, but was permitted to continue using Breakfast Television as the title of its morning show. In August 2011, the program was re-branded as CTV Morning Live, in keeping with the launch (or relaunch) of local morning shows under the same title on CTV and CTV Two stations in various parts of Canada.

Former presenters

- Scott Boyd
- Jill Krop
- Liz Rigney
- Kurt Stoodley
- Cyril Lunney
- JC Michaels
- Todd Battis
- JC Douglas
- Jayson Baxter
- Maria Panapolis

=== Edmonton edition ===
On May 7, 2015, Rogers announced the cancellation of Breakfast Television in Edmonton as part of cutbacks. It was replaced by a spin-off known as Dinner Television, a new two-hour evening program hosted by Jason Strudwick, joined by BT personalities Bridget Ryan and Courtney Theriault. The program was a newsmagazine with discussion segments, and did not feature original news reporting. The former BT timeslot was filled by encores of the previous evening's edition of Dinner Television with on-screen news, traffic, and weather information. Dinner Television was subsequently cancelled in 2017 with the relaunch of local CityNews Edmonton newscasts.

Former presenters

- Bill Welychka - Host (2005–2006)

=== Montreal edition ===
Rogers was granted approval by the CRTC on December 20, 2012 to acquire CJNT Montreal and convert it from a multicultural station to a fully English Citytv station. As part of the approval, Rogers had until September 1, 2013 to produce local programming on the station, which included a three-hour Montreal edition of Breakfast Television.

On June 6, 2013, Rogers announced that the Montreal edition of Breakfast Television would premiere on August 26, 2013, and would be hosted by Alexandre Despatie and Joanne Vrakas. Despatie left the program in 2015, and was succeeded by Derick Fage.

On September 5, 2019, Rogers Media announced the cancellation of Breakfast Television Montreal, effective immediately. Colette Watson, senior vice-president of television and broadcast operations at Rogers Media, stated that the program was "not sustainable".

Former presenters

- Joanne Vrakas - Co-host
- Derick Fage - Co-host (2015–2019)
- Catherine Verdon Diamond - Weather and traffic
- Alexandre Despatie - Co-host (2013–2015)
