= Lyndsay Morrison =

Canadian television personality

Lyndsay Morrison is a Canadian television personality for Bell Media. She is currently the weather anchor for CTV News Toronto with Nathan Downer and Michelle Dubé. Previously she served the same role at CTV News Kitchener for its news at noon, 5 and 6 newscast. In addition, she was the weekend morning radio host for 99.5 Virgin Radio. Morrison had served a number of fill in roles for various CTV News programs. she was a substitute weather and sports anchor for its breakfast television program Your Morning and its predecessor Canada AM. Morrison started her broadcast career as a weather forecaster for The Weather Network.

== See also ==
- Ross Hull

== s ==
- ctvnews.ca
- http://www.iheartradio.ca/virginradio/kitchener/shows/lyndsay-morrison-1.2584207
