= CP24 Breakfast =

Coordinates: 43.649701°N 79.390233°W

- Genre: News/morning show
- Presented by: Nick Dixon; Jennifer Hsiung; Bill Coulter; Jee-Yun Lee
- Country of origin: Canada
- Original language: English

Production
- Production locations: 9 Channel Nine Court; Scarborough, Toronto, Ontario
- Running time: 4 hours
- Production company: Bell Media

Original release
- Network: CP24
- Release: March 26, 2009 – present

Related
- Breakfast Television; Live at 5, Live at 5:30

CP24 Breakfast is a Canadian morning television news show that airs on CP24 (a local 24-hour television news service in Toronto) weekdays from 6:00 a.m. to 10:00 a.m. as of June 2024.

The weekday edition is anchored by Nick Dixon and Jennifer Hsiung. Bill Coulter is the meteorologist, and Jee-Yun Lee is the remote and Live Eye Host. Various staff make transit and traffic announcements. The show formerly had a separate host position which was eliminated following the retirement of George Lagogianes.

== History ==
=== Launch (2009–2019) ===
CP24 Breakfast first aired on March 26, 2009, displacing the simulcast of Citytv Toronto's Breakfast Television, which is now owned by Rogers Media and had been airing on CP24 since its inception in 1998. On the same day of the launch, CTVglobemedia (now Bell Media) relaunched its Toronto-based oldies music radio station, 1050 CHUM, as a news/talk radio station CP24 Radio 1050 which the station operated primarily as a simulcast of CP24's television counterpart, which was later reverted to an all-sports radio format as TSN Radio 1050 as of April 2011. Prior to the launch of CP24 Breakfast, from February 2009, until March 25, 2009, CP24 had its own news inserts during commercial breaks on BT known as More On CP24 in which CP24 anchors would do extended morning news updates. Unofficially Citytv hosts had constantly referred to Breakfast Television being "only on Citytv, Cable 7" several months before CP24 launched its own new morning show.

The program debuted with Ann Rohmer as news anchor, Melissa Grelo and Matte Babel as co-hosts, live reporter Cam Wooley, weather specialist Nalini Sharma, and Bob Summers, Steve Anthony and Mika Midolo as part of the traffic team. Babel switched to the "Live Eye" six months later before leaving in 2010, Anthony took his place as cohost. Rohmer exited the show in June 2010 and was later replaced by Lindsey Deluce. Sharma went on maternity leave in early 2012 and switched to the "Live Eye" upon returning a year later before leaving the show altogether in 2014. Bill Coulter joined the weather team in her place. Deluce took a maternity leave in mid-2012 and was temporarily replaced by Farah Nasser who herself went on maternity leave, six months later. George Lagogianes filled her spot throughout her second maternity leave beginning in the fall of 2014. Lindsey Deluce returned to CP24 in late 2015; however, she soon left to join CTV's sister station's new breakfast show Your Morning. Gurdeep Ahulwaila took over as Anchor following her departure.

On March 19, 2011, CP24 extended its morning show with the launch of CP24 Breakfast Weekend Edition, becoming the first station in Toronto to serve a morning show seven days a week. The program was initially hosted by Gurdeep Ahulwalia (later replaced by Nneka Elliott) and Pooja Handa (later replaced by Travis Dhanraj).

In August 2011, CP24 extended its breakfast show to include Before Breakfast, initially the program was hosted by Lindsey Deluce, which airs weekdays from 5:00 a.m. - 5:30 a.m. In the summer of 2023, the Before Breakfast program was moved to a 5:30 a.m. - 6:00 a.m. timeslot, it was discontinued one year later following the breakfast show's time-slot change to run from 6:00 am to 10:00 am.

=== Program changes (2019–present) ===
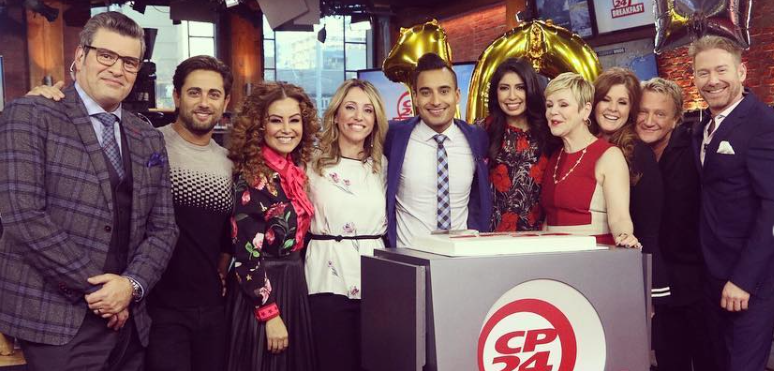
CP24 Breakfast hosts (past and present) celebrate the 10th anniversary of the show with a special broadcast.

- March 26, 2019 – CP24 Breakfast celebrated its 10th anniversary where all former hosts returned to celebrate the show.
- September 2019 – Jamie Gutfreund announced he was moving to another position on CP24 and was leaving the CP24 Breakfast Weekend show, as well as the Live Eye host for the weekday show. He was replaced with Brandon Gonez from Your Morning.
- March 2020 – Following the onset of the COVID-19 pandemic, CP24 Breakfast suspended in-studio guests and host moved to socially distance while on the air. The weekend edition was also suspended and took on a similar format to the rest of CP24 daily programming.
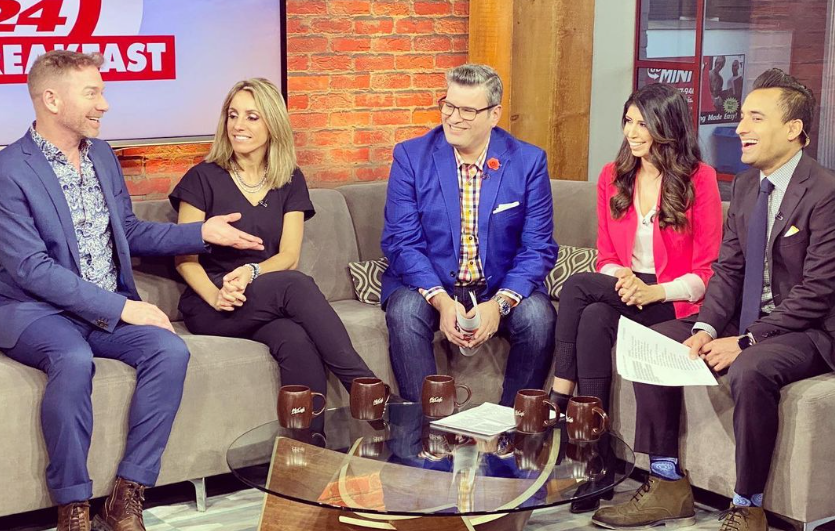
  The hosts on the CP24 Breakfast couch for a 2019 segment.
- March 18, 2021 – Cam Woolley announced he would be retiring after 13 years on the morning show. During his time on CP24 Breakfast, he covered every major story in Toronto and was part of the original cast of. He officially retired on April 15, 2021. His final show was well celebrated, featuring many well wishers and messages from viewers and community figures. He was later replaced by Courtney Heels.
- August 10, 2021 – Pooja Handa unexpectedly announced just 10 minutes before the ending of the day's show that it would be her last and she would be departing CP24 Breakfast after six years as host of the Weekday show. Her position was later removed and no replacement host was announced to fill the vacancy.
- August 27, 2021 – Only weeks after Handa made a surprise departure, news anchor Gurdeep Ahluwalia also unexpectedly left the show, leaving in the same fashion, only making the announcement 10 minutes before the show ended. These departures are unusual, as most past departures have featured a fanfared show with many goodbye messages. The official social media accounts of CP24 and CP24 Breakfast failed to mention or post about either Ahluwalia or Handa's departures. It was announced that Nick Dixon would immediately take over as news anchor. It was later revealed that Handa and Ahluwalia would go on to launch their own morning radio show on 98.1 CHFI titled the "Pooja and Gurdeep Show"
- Summer 2022 – CP24 welcomed back regular appearances from in-studio guests and returned to more frequent Live Eye segments hosted by Jee-Yun Lee.
- December 13, 2022 – George Lagogianes announced he would be retiring from CP24 Breakfast after 36 years in broadcasting. He joined CP24 Breakfast in 2014 while covering a maternity leave for Lindsey Deluce, following Steve Anthony's Departure in 2017 Lagogianes was promoted to co-Host. His final show featured many CP24 Breakfast alumni with video messages and tributes from Toronto mayor John Tory and viewers of CP24 Breakfast. A replacement for George Lagogianes has yet to be announced.
- December 23, 2023 – Mika Midolo's last day at CP24 and CP24 Breakfast. Following her early 2022 Non-Hodgkin lymphoma cancer diagnosis, she never returned on a regular basis to the breakfast program, but did make some appearances. Despite being the last remaining original host of CP24 Breakfast, she did not get the chance to directly say goodbye on-air to her fellow hosts nor audience. The weather and traffic hosts announced her departure in a short segment.
- November 25, 2024 – After over 15 years at 299 Queen Street West, the final edition of CP24 Breakfast to broadcast from this location aired. The hosts celebrated the memories and history of this building as they bid farewell. This move was announced earlier this year as Bell Media looks to group its news operations at one location. As of November 26, 2024, CP24 Breakfast and other CP24 programming began broadcasting from CTV studios in Scarborough.

== On-air staff ==
=== Current ===
- Hosts: Bill Coulter, Jennifer Hsiung and Nick Dixon
- Remote host: Jee-Yun Lee
- Reporter: Courtney Heels

=== Former ===
- Melissa Grelo: former host
- Steve Anthony: former host
- Lindsey Deluce: former news anchor
- Ann Rohmer: former news anchor
- Jamie Gutfreund: former Live Eye reporter, weekend host/anchor
- Cam Woolley: former reporter
- Pooja Handa: former host, now with CHFI-FM
- Gurdeep Ahluwalia: former host, now with CHFI-FM
- George Lagogianes: former host
- Mika Midolo: former Transit and traffic Specialist (left 2023 after leave for cancer treatment)

=== Timeline of hosts ===
Hosts	Years														
Hosts	2009	2010	2011	2012	2013	2014	2015	2016	2017	2018	2019	2020	2021	2022	2023
Hosts	Current hosts														
Bill Coulter				Weather Anchor											
Nick Dixon														News Anchor	
Jennifer Hsiung														News Anchor	
Jee-Yun Lee														Remote Live Eye Host	
	Former hosts														
Ann Rohmer	News Anchor														
Matte Babel	Host														
Lindsey Deluce	—N/a		News Anchor												
Melissa Grelo	Host														
Nalini Sharma	Weather/Remove Live Eye Host														
Steve Anthony	Host														
Cam Wooley	Field Reporter														
Jamie Gutfreund						Remote Live Eye Host									
Pooja Handa				Host											
Gurdeep Ahluwalia				News Anchor											
George Lagogianes						Host									
Mika Midola	Transit Specialist														

== Set ==
CP24 was originally located on the second floor of 299 Queen Street West in Toronto. Large north-facing windows looked out towards Queen Street. During the summer months the breakfast show also used an outdoor patio for some broadcasts. In November 2024, CP24 was relocated to 9 Channel Nine Court. The set and newsroom is home to CP24 Breakfast and most of the other CP24-produced programming.

== Awards and nominations ==
In 2020, at the 8th Canadian Screen Awards, CP24 Breakfast was nominated for "Best Morning Show".
