= Live at 5:30 =

Live at 5:30 may refer to:

- Live at 5:30 (Canadian TV program), a CP24 newscast serving the Greater Toronto market
- Live @ 5:30, a talk show on CHCH Hamilton hosted by Mark Hebscher and Donna Skelly

== See also ==
- Live at Five (disambiguation)
