= Kate Wheeler =

Journalist

Kate Wheeler is a Canadian broadcast journalist and former Network Managing Editor at Global News.

== Career ==
Wheeler began her on-air news career in 1987 at CFTO in Toronto as a reporter, where she would become an anchor the following year and the weekend news anchor in 1990. The next year she was promoted to co-anchor of CFTO's News at 6 with Tom Gibney.

Wheeler sat in for both Lloyd Robertson and Sandie Rinaldo on CTV National News and also handled long term fill in duties for news and hosting on Canada AM.

She served as senior reporter and daytime news anchor for CTV News Channel from February 2001 to November 2008 before moving to Corus Entertainment to launch the CBC affiliate in Durham.

In 1985, she was featured in a five-part Citytv news serial The Kate Wheeler Story: Diary of a Victim which detailed her previous experience as the victim of a random stabbing attack.

Until September 2013 Wheeler was the news director and anchor for Studio 12 News on CHEX Durham, which launched in September 2010.

From February 2014 to June 2016 Wheeler co-hosted the show What She Said on SiriusXM Canada's Canada Talks channel, with Christine Bentley and Sharon Caddy.

What She Said! with Kate Wheeler and Christine Bentley moved to the Jewel Radio Network (Evanov Radio Group) starting July 9, 2016 and in December, 2017 were brought on board @1059TheRegion.

Wheeler is a part-time lecturer at Durham College.

In January 2019 Wheeler became a Network Managing Editor at Global News.
