= Stephen LeDrew =

Canadian broadcaster

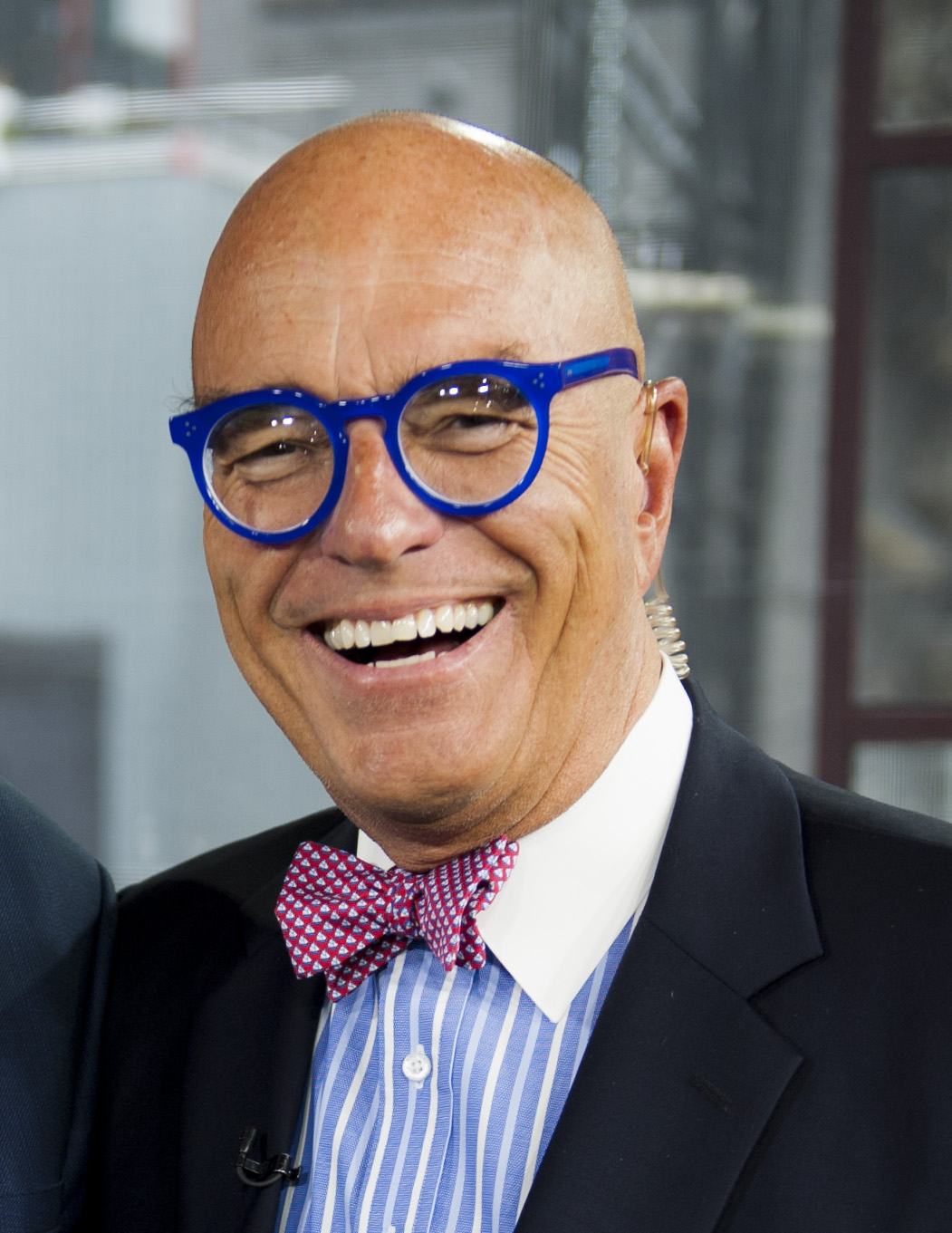

President of the Liberal Party of Canada
- In office 1998–2003
- Preceded by: Dan Hays
- Succeeded by: Michael Eizenga

Personal details
- Born: Stephen Ralph LeDrew; 1953 (age 72–73)
- Party: Liberal (federal)
- Education: University of Toronto (BA); University of Windsor (LLB)
- Occupation: Broadcaster, lawyer, politician
- Website: https://www.stephenledrew.ca/

Stephen Ralph LeDrew (born 1953) is a Toronto-based lawyer and broadcaster. He served as President of the Liberal Party of Canada from 1998 to 2003, and was a Mayor of Toronto candidate in the 2006 municipal election. He hosted LeDrew Live on CP24 and also co-hosted CP24 Live at Noon as well as being the news station's political analyst until he was fired in December 2017 after seven years with the station.

== Education ==
LeDrew received his B.A. from the University of Toronto and his LL.B. from the University of Windsor Faculty of Law.

== Legal career ==
As a lawyer, LeDrew served as the Executive Assistant to the Solicitor General of Canada, Government Affairs Counsel for Manulife, and Director of Operations in the Prime Minister's Office. After serving in government, he practised administrative law in the private sector for over 25 years.

== Political career ==
LeDrew was recruited by Bill Lee, John Turner's early campaign manager during the 1984 Canadian federal election, to be Turner's campaign tour director during the 1984 Liberal Party of Canada leadership election to succeed Pierre Trudeau.

LeDrew was elected president of the Liberal Party of Canada in March 1998, then re-elected in March 2000, serving until November 2003. Occasionally outspoken, he famously derided the Chrétien government's plan to severely limit corporate donations to political parties as being as "dumb as a bag of hammers".

On September 28, 2006, immediately prior to nomination cut-off date, LeDrew announced his candidacy for Mayor of Toronto in that year's municipal election against incumbent David Miller, centre-right challenger Jane Pitfield and a host of fringe candidates. Although he received considerable media coverage and was invited to participate in election debates with Miller and Pitfield, LeDrew finished a distant third with only 1.3% of the vote.

== Broadcasting ==
From 2007 until 2009, LeDrew co-hosted a talk show with Michael Coren on CFRB 1010 in Toronto titled Two Bald Guys With Strong Opinions. In January 2009, LeDrew began co-hosting a weekday noon news programme with Ann Rohmer on CP24 titled Live at Noon working there as a political analyst. Due to these television commitments, LeDrew quit his CFRB 1010 show on March 25, 2009. He was fired from CP24 in December 2017 for violating the non-competition clause of his contract by appearing on Fox News Channel.

From 2018 to 2020, LeDrew produced a series of video commentaries for the National Post's website. Since 2020, he has hosted The LeDrew Three Minute Interview podcast.

== Personal ==
In 2005, LeDrew was forced to declare personal bankruptcy by his sole creditor, the federal government. The judge on the case noted that LeDrew placed priority on personal expenses rather than his tax obligations. LeDrew stated in reply at the time that his children and their needs came first.

Stephen LeDrew is past president of the National Club in Toronto.

== Electoral record ==
2006 Toronto municipal election: Mayor of Toronto
| Candidate | Votes | % |
|---|---|---|
| David Miller | 332,969 | 56.97 |
| Jane Pitfield | 188,932 | 32.32 |
| Stephen LeDrew | 8,078 | 1.38 |
| 35 other candidates | 54,508 | 9.33 |
| Total valid votes | 584,484 | 100.00 |

For full results, see 2006 Toronto municipal election.

Party political offices
| Preceded by Dan Hays | President of the Liberal Party of Canada; 1998–2003 | Succeeded by Michael Eizenga |
