= CP24 =

Canadian television news channel

Coordinates: 43.649701°N 79.390233°W

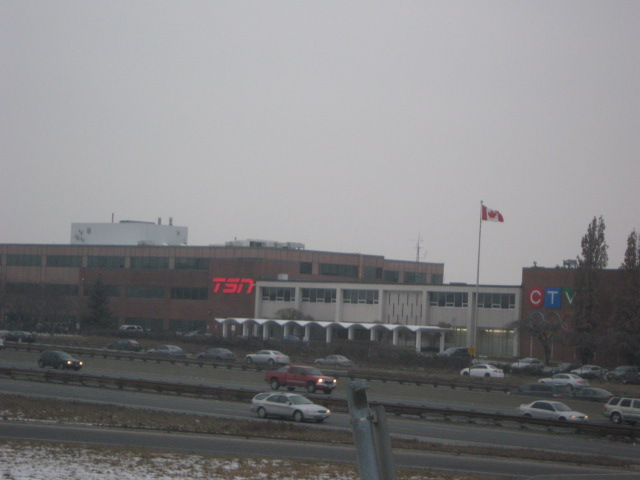
- Since 2024, CP24 is based at Bell Media Agincourt complex sharing the studios with CTV Toronto.
- Country: Canada
- Broadcast area: Canada
- Headquarters: 9 Channel Nine Court, Scarborough, Ontario, Canada

Programming
- Picture format: 1080i HDTV (downscaled to letterboxed 480i for the SDTV feed)

Ownership
- Owner: CHUM Limited (1998–2007, 70.1% to 2004); Sun Media (1998–2004, 29.9%); CTVglobemedia (CTV Limited) (2007–2011, 80% to 2008); Rogers Media (2007–2008, 20%); BCE Inc. (2011–present)
- Parent: Bell Media
- Sister channels: TV: BNN Bloomberg, CTV News Channel, Much, Oxygen, USA Network, CFTO-DT, CKVR-DT (Barrie); Radio: CFRB, CHUM, CHUM-FM, CKFM-FM

History
- Launched: March 30, 1998; 28 years ago
- Former names: CablePulse24

Links
- Website: cp24.com

CP24 is a Canadian English-language specialty news channel owned by Bell Media, a subsidiary of BCE Inc. and operated alongside the Bell-owned CTV Television Network's owned-and-operated television stations CFTO-DT (CTV Toronto) and CKVR-DT (CTV 2 Barrie). The channel broadcasts from 9 Channel Nine Court in the Toronto borough of Scarborough.

It was launched on March 30, 1998, under the name CablePulse24 by its owners CHUM Limited and Sun Media. The channel was named as an extension of CITY-TV (Citytv Toronto)'s newscasts, which were then known as CityPulse. CHUM acquired Sun Media's interest in 2004 after acquiring the assets of Craig Media. In 2006, Bell Globemedia acquired CP24 and its parent CHUM Limited, but regulatory limits in media ownership forced CHUM to sell off the Citytv stations to avoid conflicts with CTV stations in the same markets. CTVglobemedia retained the ownership of CP24 and the small market A-Channel stations, but subsequently sold the Citytv stations including CITY-TV, to Rogers Media in mid-2007, which held a 20% stake until 2008.

The channel focuses on local news from the Greater Toronto Area and Southern Ontario, while also covering national and international news. It is distributed through cable in Southern Ontario and direct broadcast satellite nationally.

As of 2023, CP24 streams free worldwide on its website with no subscription required.

== History ==
Old version of the CP24 logo, used from 1998 to 2003

=== Under CHUM ===
The channel was licensed by the Canadian Radio-television and Telecommunications Commission (CRTC) in 1996 as Pulse 24, described as "a 24-hour-a-day specialty television service devoted to news and information, with a focus on southern Ontario local and regional news and information", and launched on March 30, 1998, as CablePulse 24, under the ownership of CHUM Limited, the parent company of CITY-TV and minority partner Sun Media, owner of the Toronto Sun daily newspaper with most programming broadcast out of 299 Queen Street West. For the first 10 years after its inception, CP24's programming was anchored and featured reports from Citytv personalities, live CityPulse news broadcasts were immediately repeated on CP24 after their initial broadcast on CITY-TV (except for breaking news coverage), and special coverage was simulcast between the channel and the television station. Select programming from other CHUM stations would also be featured on the channel, including The NewMusic and Fashion Television; another program, 24Ontario, featured news stories from CHUM's NewNet stations elsewhere in the province.

Overnight broadcasts on CP24 featured vintage CityPulse news broadcasts from CITY-TV during the 1970s & 1980s branded as Rewind. The rebroadcasts were accompanied by a graphic on the top right corner of the screen that read "Rewind", supplemented with the original airdate below it.

On December 1, 2004, CHUM Limited acquired the remaining interest in CP24 (giving it 100% of its shares), when the Sun's owners sold their 29.9% share in CP24 after acquiring its independent broadcast station CKXT-TV, the same day that CHUM Limited took control of Craig Media and its assets also.

Under CHUM ownership, Mark Dailey of CITY provided continuity voice announcements on CP24.

=== Under CTV ===
Logo used from 2003 to 2012

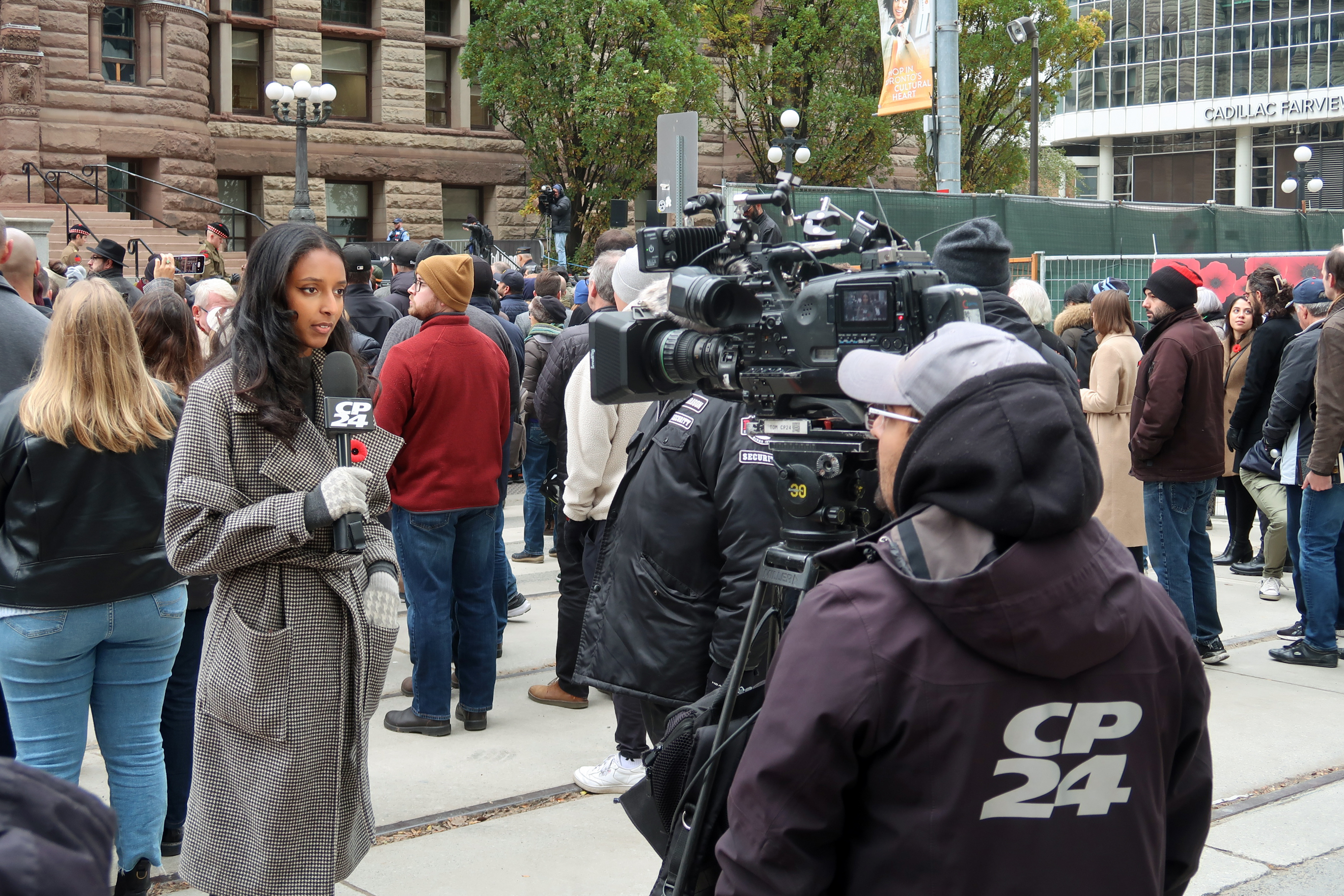
CP24's reporter outside Old Toronto City Hall

As a result of the ownership changes, CP24 began to separate its operations from those of CITY-TV. This process began in 2008, with the introduction of new CP24-only personalities (which meant they were no longer seen anchoring/reporting on the CityNews side), new live eye trucks (also known as Breaking News Vehicles) which were outfitted with white and black design bearing the CP24 and red "Breaking News" decals, the establishment of a new studio and newsroom on the second floor of the 299 Queen Street West building in November of that year, and the removal of nearly all Citytv's news simulcasts from its schedule few weeks later on December 10 of that year, (excluding Breakfast Television), and replacing the 6 p.m. CityNews simulcast with CFTO's CTV News Toronto at Six. (Note: Critics had speculated that the latter change was likely as a response to the announcement of the CRTC granting approval to an application by Rogers Media for its own regional news channel focusing on the Greater Toronto Area, the CityNews Channel.)

On March 26, 2009, Breakfast Television was replaced with the launch of its own new morning show, CP24 Breakfast, which marked the completion of CP24's separation from Citytv. Also coinciding with the launch, included the rebranding of its oldies music radio station 1050 CHUM (another station which was acquired in the CTV/CHUM acquisition) to a news talk radio format which operated as an audio simulcast of CP24 called "CP24 Radio 1050". The move was intended to broaden the network's reach as a multi-platform news source, but did not prove successful; Toronto Sun columnist Ted Woloshyn in particular pointed out that the station was simply airing a straight simulcast of CP24 television content that was not properly formatted for radio. (Note: This arrangement ended on April 13, 2011, with the launch of a new TSN-branded sports talk format, "TSN Radio 1050", (which became the first station of the new national TSN Radio network) few weeks after Bell Canada took control of CTVglobemedia's assets including CP24, with the latter company becoming known as Bell Media.)

Following the layoffs and cost-cutting measures that took place at the Citytv stations across Canada (including the cancellation of Citytv Toronto's CityNews at Five announced on January 19, 2010), CP24 immediately expanded its Live at 5 newscast (which had been airing for 15 minutes since its launch in 2008) to 30 minutes along with the launch of another half-hour newscast, Live at 5:30. As a result, CP24's late-afternoon talk shows, such as Animal House Calls and Hot Property, which had been seen weekdays at 5:15 p.m. were moved to a new 7:15 p.m. time slot on January 26, 2010.

=== Under Bell ===
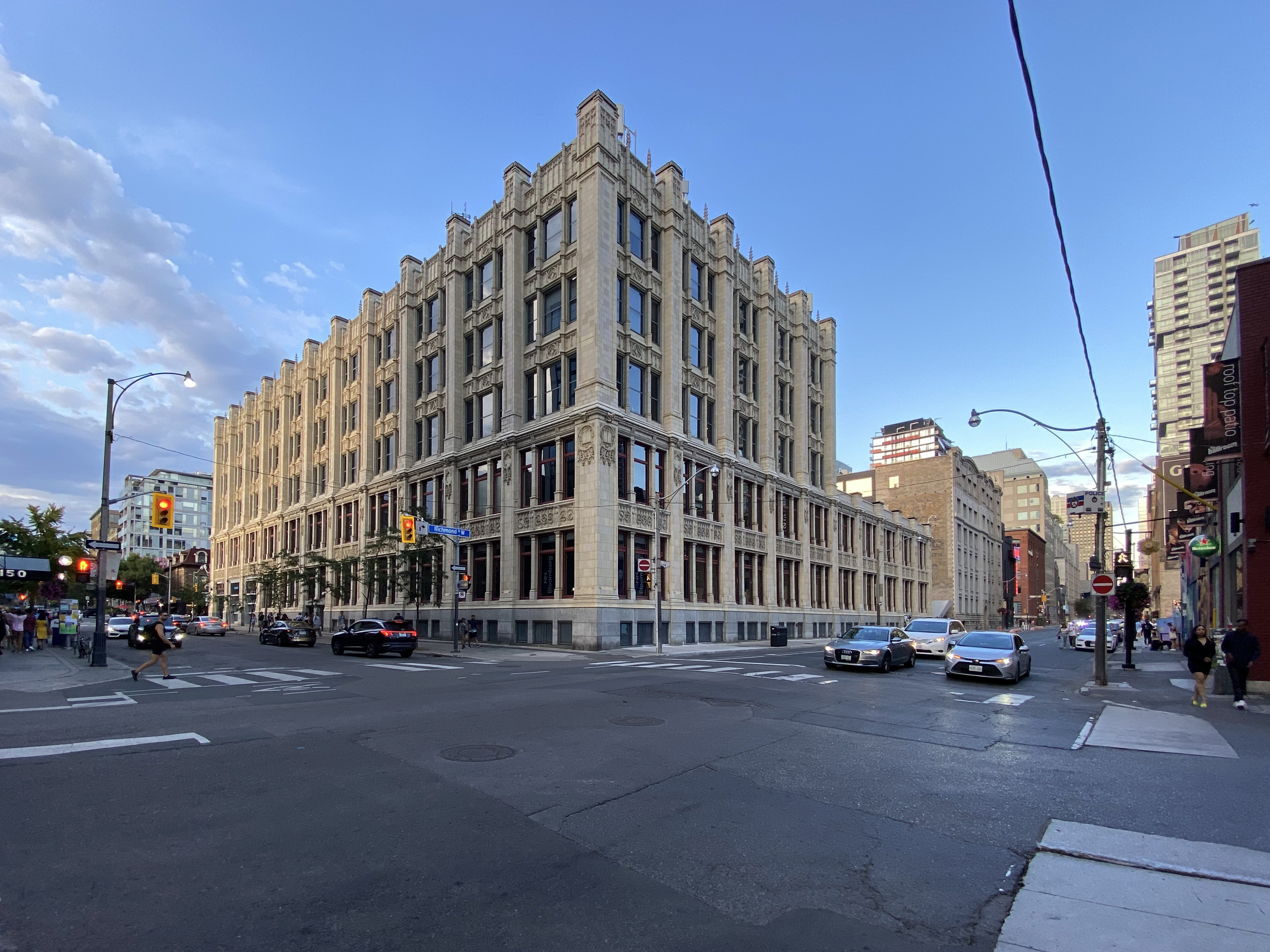
CP24 was based out of 299 Queen Street West in Downtown Toronto from 1998 until 2024.

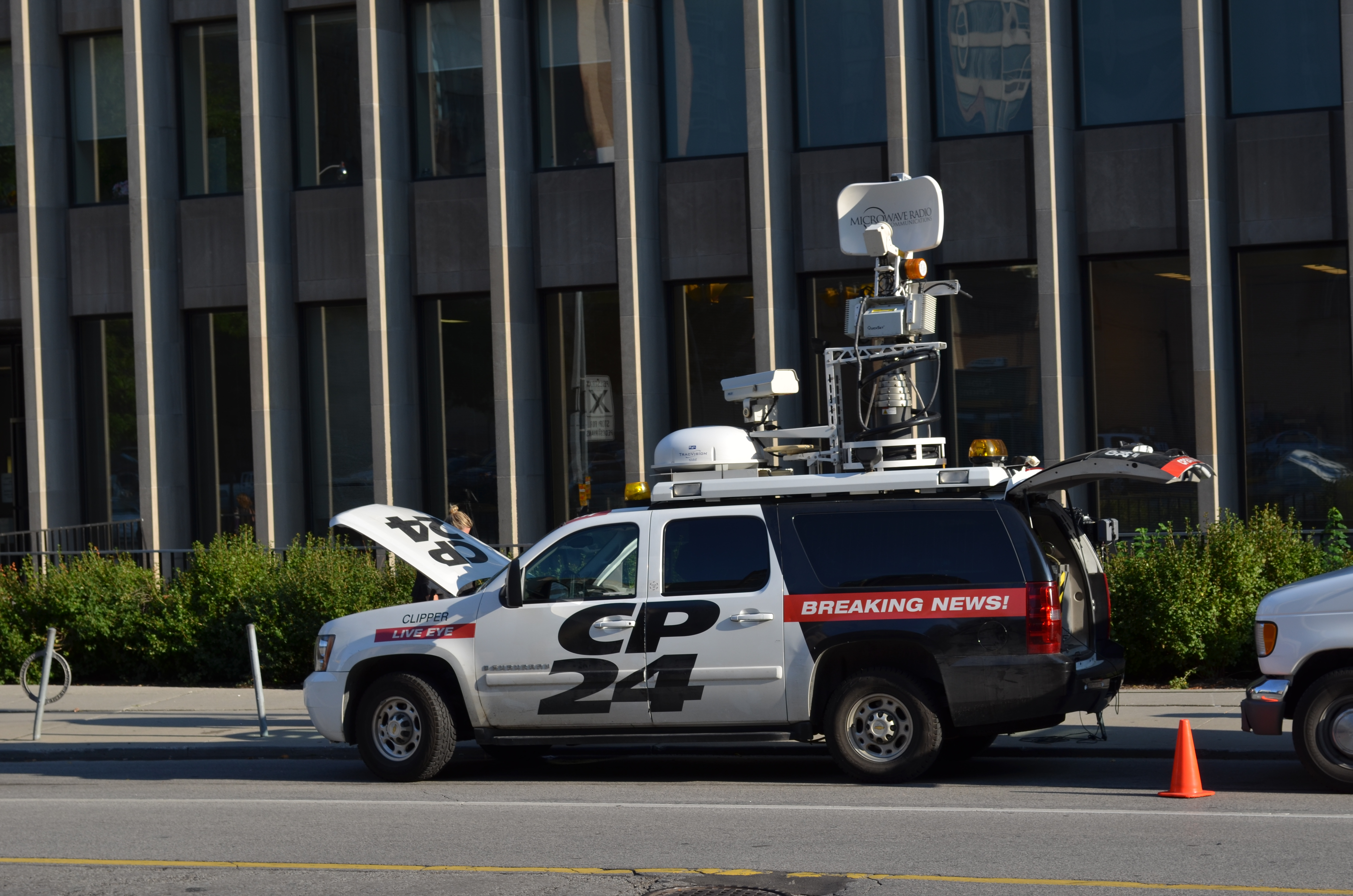
CP24 van

On September 10, 2010, BCE (a minority shareholder in CTVglobemedia) announced that it planned to acquire 100% interest in CTVglobemedia for a total debt and equity transaction cost of $3.2 billion CAD. The deal which required CRTC approval, was approved on March 7, 2011 and closed on April 1 of that year, on which CTVglobemedia was rebranded Bell Media.

On March 19, 2011, CP24 introduced a weekend edition of CP24 Breakfast, hosted by Pooja Handa and Gurdeep Ahluwalia, George Lagogianes is the remote host and Nneka Elliott (who resigned on May 2, 2011, and was replaced by Jamie Gutfreund) delivers the weather forecasts. The show runs from 7:00 to 10:15 a.m.

On June 20, 2024, Bell announced that CP24 would move studios from 299 Queen Street West, where it was based since its inception, to Bell Media's 9 Channel Nine Court building in Scarborough (which houses the operations of CFTO and several other Bell Media specialty networks) later in the year. The network broadcast for the first time from the Agincourt complex on November 26, 2024; 299 Queen Street West will continue to serve as a downtown bureau for CFTO and CP24.

== Location and format ==
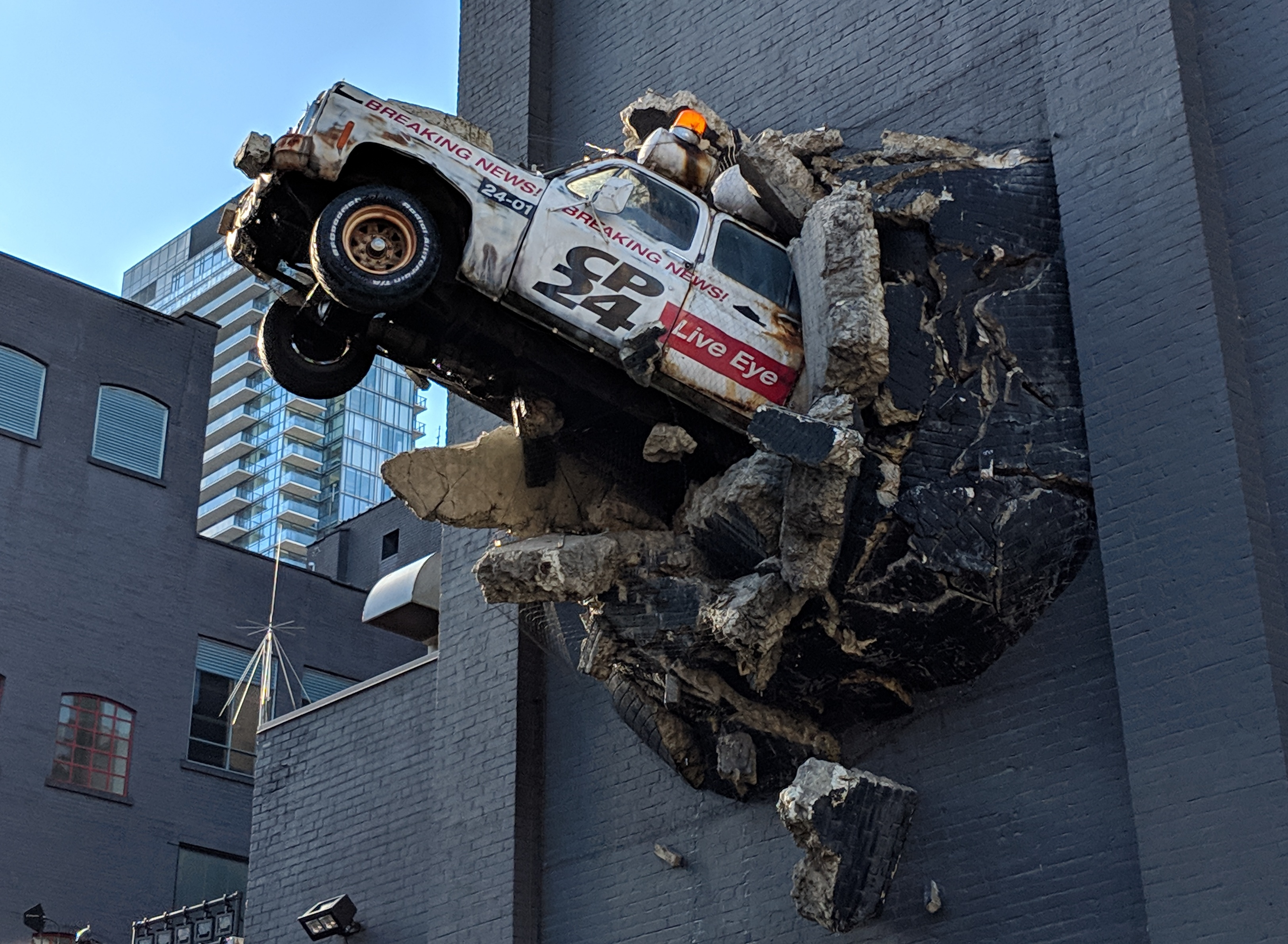
CP24's Breaking News truck at 299 Queen Street West. This was originally painted in the CityPulse livery.

As of November 26, 2024, CP24 is based out of 9 Channel Nine Court in Scarborough at Highway 401 and McCowan Road which is also home to several other Bell-owned television stations such as CTV Toronto, USA Network and TSN.

Previously, CP24 was based at 299 Queen Street West, at the corner of John Street and Queen Street West which at one point shared the newsroom with CITY-TV on the ground floor (which are now the facilities of Bell Media's 24-hour business news channel, BNN Bloomberg) when both CITY-TV and CP24 were co-owned by CHUM Limited. As with CITY-TV, CP24 had no news desk for the most part while anchors read the news standing up.

In November 2008, CP24 moved its operations to a new studio and newsroom on the second floor of the complex. Coinciding with the new studio, CP24 also adopted an updated on-air appearance, replacing the previous blue and gold colour scheme with a red, white and black design.

CP24's screen format uses a window in the top-left of the screen to show the current program, which is surrounded with a sidebar with weather and traffic reports, scrolling news headlines and local entertainment/event information, and tickers for stocks and sports. This format has been described as more closely resembling a website than a conventional television channel, and has been replicated with a similar look of CP24's enriched screen on its website. This format was referred to as "NewStyle NewsFlow" during the CHUM era.

On September 27, 2012, CP24 again updated its on-air appearance as the channel began broadcasting in high definition. The relaunched enriched screen includes several changes, such as:

- the entertainment and concert listings were reallocated from the bottom screen to the right-hand corner between the weather and traffic boxes,
- the weather scroll was expanded to a "five-day" contrast (which previously only displayed in "four-day" contrast) on which the scroll displays the forecast breakdown for the next 24-hours (e.g., "MORN" for both the current morning and the next morning, "AFT", for afternoon, "EVE" for evening and "NITE" for overnight), and
- a larger sports headline news scroll was added at the bottom, in which business news from Canada's Toronto Stock Exchange and the American New York Stock Exchange takes over the sports headline scroll Monday-Friday.

== Programming ==
- Ask a Lawyer
- CP24 Breakfast
- CP24 Dayside
- CP24 Nightside
- Hot Property
- Know Your Rights
- Live at 5
- Live at 5:30
- Live at 11

== Special programming ==
- CP24 Know it all

== Former programming ==
- Animal House Calls
- Breakfast Television
- The Chief
- CityNews at 6
- CityNews at Noon
- CityNews International
- CityNews Tonight
- CP24 Tonight
- Help TV
- Live at Noon
- The Mayor
- MediaTelevision
- Silverman Helps
- Speakers Corner

== Other affiliations ==
CP24 shares news resources with other Bell Media-owned outlets, including the news/talk radio affiliate CFRB "Newstalk 1010", sports updates with TSN (and CHUM "TSN Radio 1050"), business news updates with BNN Bloomberg and entertainment news updates with eTalk. From its inception prior to its acquisition by CTV, CP24 was closely integrated with CITY-DT's newsroom, which had shared programming, anchors and hosts at the time. CP24, is now available on iHeartRadio Canada effective December 2017.

== Carriage and popularity ==
CP24 is seen on cable channel 24 on most cable providers that carry the channel. It is not carried on any analogue cable system outside of Central or Southern Ontario, although it is available on direct broadcast satellite and IPTV television providers in some markets. The channel is available across Canada on Bell Satellite TV, on which the station is part of the service's "News" package. It is also available in the "FYI" package provided to Shaw Direct customers.

Because of its diverse, localized and partially text-based content, the channel is among the most popular choices in the Greater Toronto Area and much of Southern Ontario (outside of Ottawa) for screening in public places such as waiting areas, train stations, restaurants, and lounges.

== Remote camera use ==
In addition to the Freeway Management System – COMPASS and RESCU cameras, CP24 operates EYES cameras located at:

- CN Tower
- Highway 401
- Toronto Pearson International Airport
- Rogers Centre
- Toronto City Hall
- Don Valley Parkway
- 299 Queen Street West

=== Chopper 24 ===
Since 2008, CP24 has leased a Bell 206L-4 Long Ranger (C-FCTV) news helicopter which can broadcast live at 1500 feet above land; nicknamed Chopper 24, which is supplied by its sister station, CTV Toronto and is painted with CTV's colouring and logo.

=== Remote truck use ===
CP24 operates a fleet of remote transmission trucks that use digital microwave and satellite uplink systems to do live news reports throughout the region. Known as "Breaking News Vehicles" the custom-built 2008 Chevrolet Suburbans were outfitted by Frontline Communications of Clearwater, Florida, USA. The vehicles utilize a red, white and black paint scheme with the channel's logo and the "Breaking News!" slogan also included in the design.

=== Beat the Traffic ===
In 2009, CP24 became the first station in Canada to introduce a new Beat the Traffic system showing a three-dimensional animated map displaying traffic flow, roadwork, accidents and current highway travel times.

== CP24 HD ==
The CRTC approved an application by then-owners CHUM Limited in June 2007 to launch a high-definition simulcast of CP24. On September 27, 2012, CP24 began broadcasting in HD (with the SD feed letterboxed) initially on Bell Fibe TV coinciding with it, a new enhanced on-air appearance. The HD feed was also added on the Bell Satellite TV service in December 2012. On June 25, 2013, CP24 began broadcasting in HD on Rogers Cable, shortly after the competing Rogers Media-owned CityNews Channel, which had been available in HD on Rogers Cable since launch, announced it would be shutting down. On March 1, 2017, Shaw Direct added the HD version to its lineup, it was only available in SD until then on that provider. Bell MTS has not yet launched the feed in HD.

== CP24 GO ==
In December 2013, CP24 (along with several other Bell Media television channels) launched a TV Everywhere service known as CP24 GO, which is offered for free to Bell TV customers. It can be accessed from a computer or on a mobile app such as a tablet or smartphone. However, CP24 continues to offer its occasional free live streaming of some major news events on its website.

== Criticism and controversy ==
=== Bias allegations ===
CP24 has faced scrutiny over perceived political bias in its reporting. Some viewers and commentators have suggested that the channel's coverage may favor certain political figures or parties. For instance, a 2020 Reddit post noted that CP24 frequently referred to Ontario Premier Doug Ford as "Premier Ford" while addressing Prime Minister Justin Trudeau more informally as "Justin Trudeau", prompting speculation about potential conservative bias. However, no definitive evidence has been provided to substantiate claims of systemic bias, and CP24 maintains that its reporting is impartial. A Media Bias/Fact Check review rated CP24 as "Least Biased" with high factual reporting, citing its use of credible sources like the Associated Press and a clean fact-check record.

=== Termination of Stephen LeDrew ===
In 2017, former CP24 political commentator Stephen LeDrew claimed he was fired after appearing on Fox News, alleging that his termination was due to CP24's left-leaning bias. CP24, however, stated that LeDrew was dismissed for violating a non-competition clause in his contract. The incident sparked discussions about the channel's editorial stance, though no clear evidence supported claims of political bias in this case.

=== Human Rights Complaint ===
In October 2022, former CP24 on-air personality Patricia Jaggernauth filed a human rights complaint against Bell Media, the channel's parent company. The complaint alleged workplace issues, though specific details were not publicly disclosed. The case drew attention on social media, with CP24 acknowledging the issue in a post on X. The outcome of the complaint remains unclear, and further details have not been widely reported.

== Notable on-air staff ==
=== Former ===
- Steve Anthony – weekday morning co–host of CP24 Breakfast; now head of Media Relations and member of the Advisory Board at Direct Global / Direct Co-ops
- Thalia Assuras (later moved to ABC and then CBS) – now media and crisis management consultant
- Hugh Burrill – CityNews/CP24 sports anchor and AutoShop (later with The Fan 590 Sports Radio and retired from broadcasting since June 2021)
- Lance Chilton – reporter (now in real estate)
- Mark Dailey – CityNews/CP24 anchor/reporter and host of CityNews Tonight (died on December 6, 2010, after a long battle with kidney cancer)
- Lindsey Deluce – formerly with CP24 Breakfast, now news anchor on CTV's Your Morning
- Denise Donlon (later CEO of Sony Music Canada and CBC Radio)
- Nathan Downer – moved to sister station CFTO-DT as 6 p.m. co-anchor
- Dwight Drummond – CityNews/CP24 crime reporter – former host of The Chief (joined CBC News Toronto on October 12, 2010)
- Francis D'Souza – CityNews/CP24 anchor/reporter (now anchor for CityNews Toronto)
- Mary Garofalo (later at WNYW in New York City; formerly host of Global's 16x9)
- Brandon Gonez – weather specialist/reporter; host of CP24 Breakfast Weekend (former weather specialist on Your Morning)
- Melissa Grelo – former co–host of CP24 Breakfast and anchor/reporter with CityNews/CP24 (now co–host of CTV's The Social exclusively)
- Larysa Harapyn – CityNews/CP24 entertainment reporter; now reporter with Financial Post
- Bob Hunter (founder of Greenpeace; later died of cancer)
- George Lagogianes – weekday morning co–host of CP24 Breakfast; also reporter/anchor
- Stephen LeDrew – weekdays on CP24 Live at Noon; fired from CP24 in 2017
- Avi Lewis (later with CBC and Al Jazeera English; now in politics)
- Gord Martineau – CityNews/CP24 anchor/reporter, CityNews at Six anchor for CP24, and anchor of CityNews International (now with CITY–TV's CityNews Toronto); now retired
- Jim McKenny – CityNews/CP24 sports anchor (now retired)
- Tracy Moore – reporter (now host of Citytv's CityLine)
- Anne Mroczkowski – CityNews/CP24 anchor/reporter – CityNews at Six anchor and host of The Mayor; now media consultant and occasional actor
- Cynthia Mulligan – CityNews/CP24 anchor/reporter (now with CITY–TV's CityNews Toronto)
- David Onley – CP24 anchor and host of Homepage (served as Lieutenant Governor of Ontario 2007–2014); deceased
- Alex Pierson – CityNews/CP24 reporter (later with Global News in Toronto and Sun News Network; now a radio host with Corus)
- Monita Rajpal – CityNews/CP24 anchor/reporter; later anchor/reporter with CNN International
- John Roberts (credited as J.D. Roberts) – entertainment reporter and weekend anchor (later with CNN's American Morning; formerly Atlanta–based national correspondent for Fox News Channel, now White House correspondent for Fox News)
- Ann Rohmer – formerly host of CP24 Breakfast, Animal House Calls, Hot Property and On The Quarter; returned to CP24, mainly weekend anchor
- Omar Sachedina – CP24 anchor/reporter (now a correspondent for CTV News)
- John Saunders – sportscaster, later worked for ESPN; deceased
- Stephanie Smyth – CP24 anchor/reporter (now a Liberal Member of the Ontario legislative assembly)
- Devon Soltendieck – Evening News anchor and Autoshop host; later reporter with eTalk
- Ali Velshi – CP24 anchor/business correspondent; now co-anchor of Velshi & Ruhle on MSNBC
