= Trans-Canada Fryway =

Trans-Canada Fryway is a Canadian documentary web series. It was created by Patrick Lo, Zachary Muir-Vavrina, Paul Parolin and Chris Solomon. The team describes the series as "an attempt to document every chip stand along the Trans-Canada Highway". According to Lo, they were "inspired by the feel of the Canadian Heritage moment commercials and their timeless effect".

== Production ==
In 2016, the "fry guys" made their way through Ontario (from the Quebec border to Kenora) in search of the best roadside chip stand and visited 54 chip stands in the span of three weeks. Solomon drove the truck (attached with a vintage '74 Airstream), Lo shot the footage, while Muir-Vavrina and Parolin manned the media control centre.

On their first TV appearance on Your Morning, Muir-Vavrina revealed, "we created our very own rating system called the Fryway Fork ... that consisted of five key components." The five components are fries, gravy, service, ambience, and value. After their tour across Ontario, the group awarded Wes’ Chips, Mississaugi Fry Co, and Ye Olde Chip Truck with five Fryway Forks. "The surprising thing with them: none of them had gravy," Solomon noted, "they had confidence in their product and felt like their fries could stand out on their own."

On June 16, 2017, the team recorded their Canada 150 special episode with Prime Minister Justin Trudeau at Claude Chip Wagon.

In regard to future plans and guest appearances, Parolin remarked, "Both Ryan Reynolds and Ryan Gosling at the same time would be cool as well."
