= Christine Bentley =

Canadian journalist

Christine Bentley is Canadian journalist and former news anchor on Toronto, Ontario, Canada television station CTV Toronto. She was an employee of the CTV News since 1977.

== Career ==
Christine Bentley began her career at CKVR-TV in Barrie. She then moved to CFTO-TV Toronto (CTV), after a brief stint as a summer reporter for CBC News in Toronto. Bentley started as a general assignment reporter, and then assigned to Toronto City Hall and later Queen's Park. Her next career move was being news anchor, where she worked on weekends in the following year, before moving to the 11:30 news, which she co-anchored with Ken Shaw. The next assignment were the 6:00 pm evening news, as well as the Noon news with her longtime co-anchor on CTV News.

=== Retirement ===
On September 12, 2012, during the CTV News at Six, she announced she would be leaving the station to pursue other interests after 35 years with CFTO. Bentley's last broadcast on CTV News at 6 was on September 14. Her replacement is Michelle Dubé.

With Kate Wheeler, she co-hosted and was executive producer of the talk radio show What She Said on Sirius XM and the Jewel FM Network.

== Awards ==
Bentley has received many awards over the years, primarily for her involvement in the community. She was chosen "Woman of the Year" in 2009 by Consumers' Choice Awards Canada, an organization that promotes business excellence in the GTA and across the country. In 2009, she was given the Paul Harris Fellowship Award for Community Service by the Rotary Club of Canada. Other awards include Olympic Torchbearer GTA Toronto 2010, Communication and Leadership Award 2010, Toastmasters International for outstanding service to Community, Country and Industry, Career achievement Award 2011, Women of Baycrest Award in 2011, and Daring to Dream Award in 2012. She also received a Star on Scarborough Walk of Fame in May 2013.

== Charity work ==
Bentley has served on the Board of Governors for Rouge Valley Centenary, as well as the Hospital's Foundation Board. She has served on the board of the Children's Wish Foundation of Canada, for which she is still an ambassador at large. She has been active with numerous charities, including Toy Mountain and the Canadian Cancer Society. She is also a Women Build Ambassador for Habitat for Humanity GTA.

== Personal ==
Bentley is divorced and is the mother of Canadian music producer/audio engineer DJ Swivel (born Jordan Young in 1984). Young is one of Bentley's twin sons and daughter.
