= Cam Woolley =

Canadian law enforcement officer

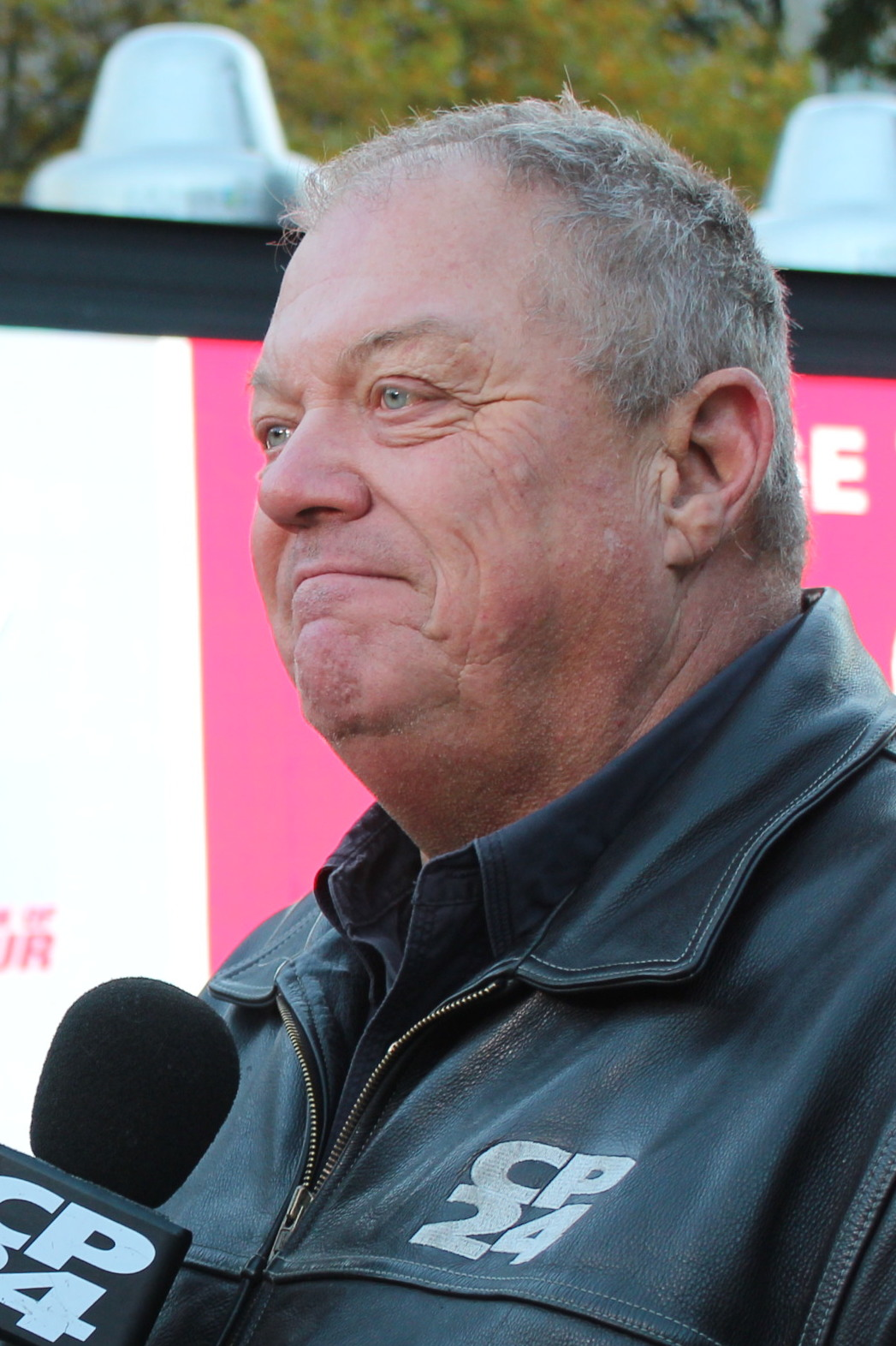
Woolley in 2019

Cam Woolley (born January 24, 1957) is a former traffic and safety reporter for CP24 and a former police officer (rank of Sergeant) with the Ontario Provincial Police (OPP) in the Greater Toronto Area. A 30-year veteran of the service, he became the face of the OPP as media coordinator for the Toronto area highway safety division. He has been regularly seen in the media since 2000, mainly in regard to forewarning of an impending traffic blitz during a long weekend on Highway 400 or providing police perspective of a major accident. Woolley was named OPP Officer of the Year in 2005.

In January 2007, there were reports that he was being courted by the Progressive Conservative Party of Ontario to run as a candidate in the 2007 Ontario general election. Woolley said he was considering the offer. The Wasaga Beach resident owns a company with his friend, Bradley Patterson, an actor and firefighter, which provides emergency and military vehicles for movie shoots in Canada including 16 Blocks, Exit Wounds and Angel Eyes. Woolley had been the resident legal "Expert" (judge) on the Discovery Channel Canada reality series, Canada's Worst Driver since joining the show in 2006.

On August 23, 2008, CTVglobemedia (now Bell Media) announced that Woolley would be retiring from the OPP on September 1, 2008 and immediately begin a broadcasting career on CP24, reporting on traffic and safety issues. Woolley also appears on CP24 Breakfast as well as on CP24 segments such as Safety First with Cam Woolley and Know Your Rights.

On March 18, 2021, CP24 Breakfast and Woolley announced he would be retiring after 13 years on the morning show. During his time on CP24 Breakfast Woolley covered every major story in Toronto and was part of the show's original cast. He retired on April 15, 2021.

In the 2026 Ontario municipal elections Wooley was elected to city council of Elizabethtown-Kitley.

== See also ==
- O.P.P. Commissioner Julian Fantino
