= Foster Hewitt Broadcasting =

Foster Hewitt Broadcasting Ltd was the corporate entity of Toronto radio CKFH 1400. The station was created by Toronto Maple Leafs hockey broadcaster Foster Hewitt in 1951.

The station was located near the legendary Maple Leaf Gardens and later moved down the bandwidth to 1430 kHz to become CKFH-AM 1430.

The company was a co-owner of CFTO-TV in the 1960s and 1970s, and was an early co-owner of CTV during the network's period as a co-operative.

The company ended with the sale of the station by Hewitt in 1980 to Telmed Communications Limited and the station was later renamed CJCL-AM 1430 in 1981 and all sports radio (FAN-1430) in 1992.

The station abandoned the frequency in 1995 for its current 590 kHz frequency and became FAN 590.
