= Live at 5 (Canadian TV program) =

- Live at 5 opening as of September 27, 2012
- Genre: News
- Starring: Various anchors
- Country of origin: Canada
- Original language: English

Production
- Production location: Toronto

Original release
- Network: CP24
- Release: January 14, 2008

Related
- Live at 5:30; CP24 Breakfast

former open

Live at 5 is a Canadian television news program that airs weekdays on CP24 from 5:00 - 5:30 p.m. It was also simulcast on CTV Toronto in addition to Live at 5:30 between July 2017 and November 2023. The show features breaking news, weather, and traffic. Also a brief look at the Top Stories of the day.

== History ==
Live at 5 premiered on January 14, 2008 as a 15-minute newscast before going to talk shows. Its original hosts were Ann Rohmer and George Lagogianes. On January 19, 2010, the program was expanded to 30 minutes in the wake of budget cuts at Rogers Media's Citytv stations across Canada including the cancellation of their 5 p.m. newscast for Toronto which is now followed by its newly launched half-hour newscast, Live at 5:30.

== Set ==
The CP24 studio is located at 9 Channel Nine Court. The set and newsroom is home to Live at 5 and most of the other CP24-produced programming.

== See also ==
- Live at 5:30 (Canadian TV program)
