= George Lagogianes =

Canadian television news anchor

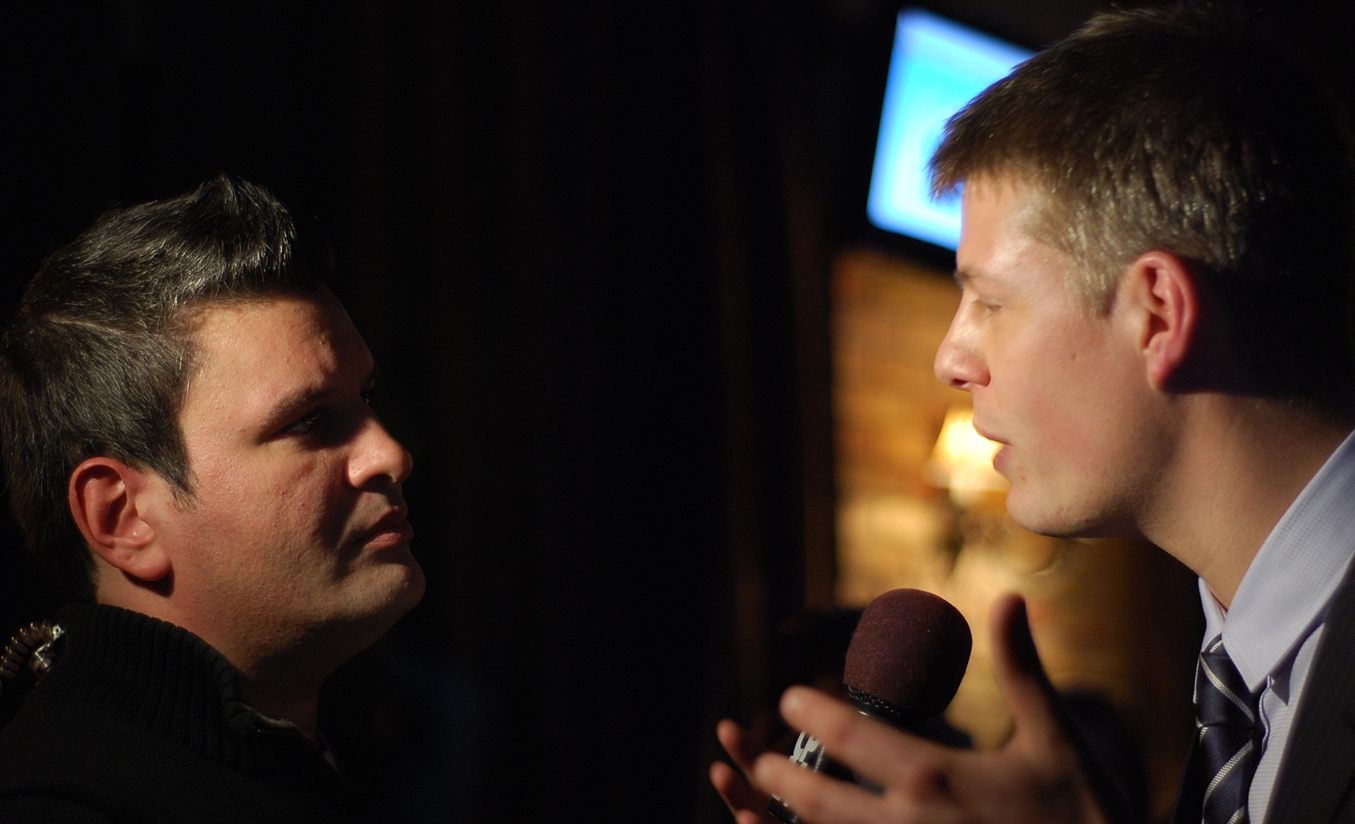
Lagogianes (left) interviewing Adam Giambrone

George Lagogianes is a Canadian television personality, best known as a longtime now former reporter and anchor for CP24.

Lagogianes graduated from Ryerson Polytechnical Institute with a bachelor's degree in radio and television arts. After graduation, he began work in 1988 as a camera operator for local Toronto television station Citytv and national music network MuchMusic, which at the time were both owned by CHUM Limited. He became a "Reporting Videographer" for the CityPulse news programme on Citytv in 1989, subsequently becoming a host and reporter for the national Bravo! arts network. He also served as co-host of the national dance music series Electric Circus, and as an interviewer for Citytv's MovieTelevision.

He debuted on CP24 in 2008 as co-host with Ann Rohmer of Live at 5, remaining with the program until its format was changed in 2010, and then anchored other programs including CP24 Breakfast. He announced his retirement from broadcasting in December 2022, with his last day on the network as December 29.
