= Anne-Marie Mediwake =

Canadian television news anchor (born 1975)

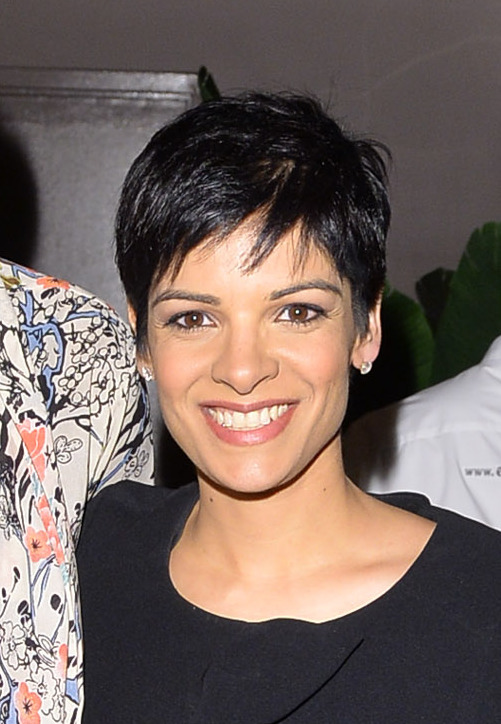
- Mediwake in 2012
- Born: May 16, 1975 (age 51); Kandy, Sri Lanka
- Occupation: Television journalist
- Years active: 1993 – present
- Spouse: Darryl Konynenbelt
- Children: 3

Anne Marie Abeyesinghe Mediwake is a Canadian television news anchor. Formerly co-anchor of Global Toronto's 6 p.m. News Hour, she was hired in September 2009 by the CBC News Network. In October 2010, she became co-anchor of CBC News Toronto's supper hour newscasts, alongside Dwight Drummond. Prior to joining CBC, Mediwake co-anchored Global Television's Toronto flagship newscast. She also helmed CTV's investigative current affairs show 21c and reported for CTV National News with Lloyd Robertson, Canada AM and CTV Newsnet. On April 27, 2016, Mediwake left her position as co-host of CBC Toronto News at 6 p.m., returning to CTV as co-host of their new national morning show, Your Morning, in summer 2016.

== Biography ==
Mediwake was born in Sri Lanka. Her parents emigrated to Canada when she was a child, settling in southern Alberta. Her father is Sri Lankan while her mother is of Scottish origin. In 1993, she started her television career in Lethbridge. Six years later she moved to Toronto where she was a reporter for CTV. While at CTV, she co-hosted the award-winning 21c, a current-affairs program aimed at Canada's younger generation, and reported for Canada AM and CTV National News.

She is married to Darryl Konynenbelt, who is also a journalist and together they have triplets Annabel Abeyesinghe, Maxim Bandara and Libby Abeyesinghe who were born in 2007. An ongoing series on the pregnancy and the births was carried in the National Post. In 2010, Konynenbelt announced that he was seeking the provincial nomination as candidate for the Progressive Conservative Party in the Ontario electoral district of Mississauga South (Konynenbelt lost the nomination to Geoff Janoscik, who lost the 2011 election to incumbent Charles Sousa).

Mediwake and Konynenbelt reside in Oakville, Ontario.
