= Michael Eizenga =

Canadian lawyer

Michael Eizenga (born July 7, 1956) is a Canadian lawyer who served as president of the Liberal Party of Canada from 2003 to 2006.

== Biography ==
Eizenga was born in London, Ontario.

=== Education and teaching career ===
Eizenga earned his B.A. (Hons.) at Huron University College before continuing his education at the Dallas Theological Seminary (Th.M.). On his return to Canada, he attended the University of Western Ontario and completed an M.A. in the Philosophy of Law (1986) and an LL.B. (1989).

Eizenga served on the Faculty of the Dallas Seminary from 1983-85. Since 1988 he has held several positions at the University of Western Ontario including adjunct professor in the Faculty of Law and as an instructor in the Department of Philosophy and the Department of Political Science. Eizenga currently teaches a Special Topics: Class Actions course at the University of Western Ontario, Faculty of Law.

=== Political career ===
Eizenga began his association with the Ontario Liberal Party in 1988 as the Executive Vice-President. During his tenure with the Provincial Party he served on the Campaign Committee and was the Constitutional and Legal Affairs Chair (1990–1992). From 1995-1997 he was the President of the Ontario Liberal Party.

In 2002, he began working with the Federal branch of the Party, was a member of the Constitution & Legal Affairs Committee, and was Secretary-Treasurer between September 2002 and November 2003, a critical period during the events of the sponsorship scandal. From 2003 to 2006 he was the President of the Liberal Party of Canada, In 2005, he announced as President that as a result of certain findings of the Gomery Commission, the Liberal Party would return $1.1 million in illegal contributions related to the sponsorship scandal that it had retained during his previous tenure as Secretary-Treasurer.

In 2008-2009 he was the National Co-Chair on the Michael Ignatieff Leadership Campaign.

=== Professional career ===
Eizenga is a partner in the Toronto office of Bennett Jones and is a former partner with the London, Ontario law firm Siskinds LLP. He specializes in class actions and complex litigation. He was the president of the Advocate’s Society from 2006-2008. He is co-author of "Class Actions Law and Practice" and co-edited "Readings in the Philosophy of Constitutional Law".

=== Other activities ===
Eizenga is currently a board member of Toronto Rehab and remains involved in Canadian politics and the Advocate's Society. In 2012, he travelled to Uganda with a group of other senior Toronto-based lawyers to assist War Child Canada.

== Key cases ==
Amongst other cases, Eizenga was involved in Bendall v. McGhan Medical Corp., [1993] O.J. No. 1948. Bendall was one of the first class action suits brought pursuant to the Class Proceedings Act, 1992.

Party political offices
Preceded by Stephen LeDrew	President of the Liberal Party of Canada; 2003–2006	Succeeded by Marie Poulin
