= Steve Anthony =

Canadian broadcaster

- Born: Stephen Anthony Gomes; 2 April 1959 (age 67); Montreal, Quebec, Canada
- Other name: Stephen Anthony Gomes

Steve Anthony (born Stephen Anthony Gomes on 2 April 1959 in Montreal, Quebec) is a former Canadian broadcaster. He gained attention throughout Canada as a MuchMusic host, or "VJ" from May 1987 to November 1995.

In 1986, Anthony moved from Montreal's CKGM to take the drive shift on Toronto's Q107. He left the following year to join MuchMusic.

Anthony was a weekday afternoon host on Toronto radio station 99.9 Mix FM, prior to its August 2008 conversion to the Virgin Radio format. He was also a panelist on the 2006 program MuchMusic VJ Search, a competition of prospective hosts for MuchMusic.

In 2009, he hosted a weekend show on Sirius Satellite Radio channel Iceberg 85 and also co-hosted Too Much '80s with Erica Ehm via Astral Media's Orbyt radio syndication service.

Beginning in March 2009, Anthony started working at CP24 (and CP24 Breakfast) as a news reporter on the CP24 news chopper, known as Chopper 24. From September 2009 until March 2018, Anthony was the co-host of CP24 Breakfast.

Anthony is also the Radio Imaging voice of many radio and television stations in North America. His voice can be heard on stations including SiriusXM NHL Network Radio, Faith-FM and more.

Anthony has been awarded with the Top Choice Award for three consecutive years.

Anthony announced that he would leave CP24 on 29 March 2018, in order to pursue projects outside of broadcasting. On 15 August 2018, Anthony announced his appointment as Head of Media Relations and member of the advisory board at Direct Global / Direct Co-ops.

== Career ==
- mid-1980s: CKGM-AM, Montreal
- 1986–1987: CILQ-FM (Q107), Toronto – radio afternoon show
- 1987–1989: CFNY-FM, Toronto – radio morning show
- 1987–1995: MuchMusic – VJ
- 1989– 1994?: Citytv, Toronto – co-host, Breakfast Television
- 1998–2001: CHOM-FM, Montreal – radio morning show
- 2001: MuchMusic, 2001: A Space Road Odyssey – television special
- 2001–2003: Mix 99.9, Toronto – radio morning show with Carla Collins
- 2003–2008: Mix 99.9, Toronto – radio afternoon show
- 2006: MuchMusic, VJ Search – panelist
- 2009: CP24 – Chopper 24 news reporter
- 2009–2018: Co-host of CP24 Breakfast
- 2015: Narrates Battle Factory
- 2018: Appointed Head of Media Relations at Direct Global / Direct Co-ops
