= Michelle Dubé =

Canadian journalist and news anchor

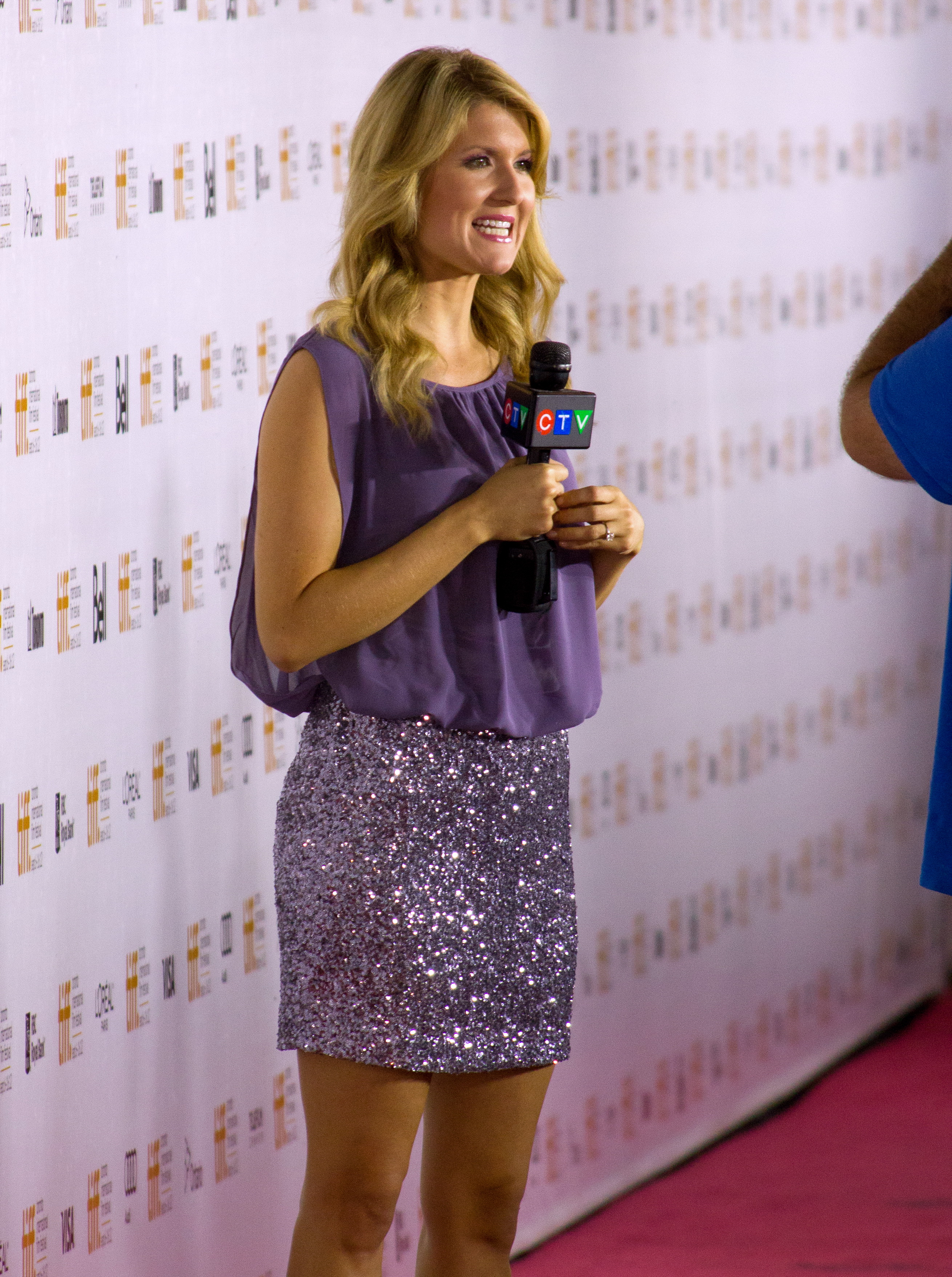
- Michelle Dubé doing a report during the 2012 Toronto International Film Festival.
- Born: September 21, 1984 (age 41); Anaheim, California, U.S.
- Education: University of Western Ontario
- Occupation: News anchor
- Years active: 2000s-present
- Employer: Bell Media
- Notable work: Co-anchor of CTV News Toronto

Michelle Dubé (born September 21, 1984) is a Canadian television journalist and news anchor for Bell Media. She is the co-anchor for CTV News at Noon and CTV News at 6 for CTV News Toronto with Ken Shaw until January 6, 2020 and with Nathan Downer since.

She won the Canadian Screen Award for Best Local News Anchor at the 7th Canadian Screen Awards in 2019.

Born in Anaheim, California to Canadian parents who were working there at the time, she grew up in Hamilton, Ontario. She joined Hamilton television station CHCH-DT as a reporter in 2007, and was promoted to anchor in 2008. In April 2009, amid the financial crisis CHCH was facing at the time, Dubé decided to leave the station for a job at CTV Toronto. She left the anchor desk, opting to report for CTV, appearing on both local and national CTV newscasts. Dubé was named the station's new co-anchor on September 15, 2012 following the retirement of Christine Bentley.

In addition to her Canadian Screen Award win in 2019, she was a nominee in the same category at the 3rd Canadian Screen Awards in 2015 and at the 6th Canadian Screen Awards in 2018.
