= Travis Dhanraj =

Canadian journalist

- Born: Calgary, Alberta, Canada
- Citizenship: Canadian
- Occupations: Journalist, news presenter
- Employer: CBC News Network (until 2025)

Travis Dhanraj is a Canadian news broadcaster and journalist. From 2023 to 2024, he hosted Canada Tonight with Travis Dhanraj on CBC News Network.

== Life and career ==
Born in Calgary, Dhanraj is of Trinidad and Tobago descent. In 2004 he graduated from the RTA School of Media at Ryerson University in Toronto with a bachelor's degree in communications.

Dhanraj began his broadcasting career at Calgary's New University Television. He also later worked for CBC News Network, before joining CBS News as a producer for The Early Show and Entertainment Tonight Canada as a journalist. In 2014, he joined CP24 Breakfast in Toronto, while also covering events for CTV News Channel. He then left for Global News, becoming their Queen's Park bureau chief.

In 2021 Dhanraj rejoined CBC News as a senior parliamentary reporter and hosted programs including Marketplace. In 2023, he was named host of Canada Tonight, going on leave at the end of 2024. His program was eventually replaced by a show hosted by Ian Hanomansing in 2025.

=== Allegations ===
Dhanraj later alleged in 2025 that he was forced to resign by CBC after he raised issues such as a lack of diversity of opinion and editorial imbalance in its political coverage. CBC spokesperson Kerry Kelly said the corporation "categorically rejects" Dhanraj's allegations. Dhanraj's lawyer, Kathryn Marshall, said that the CBC did not want him booking "Conservative voices" on his show. He also filed a human rights complaint with the Canadian Human Rights Commission. It was also reported that he was still employed with CBC despite his resignation in July 2025. He later testified to the Canadian House of Commons Standing Committee on Canadian Heritage in early 2026, where he alleged that CBC had "silenced and intimidated" him and criticized his former colleagues David Cochrane and Rosemary Barton.

=== Post-CBC ===
Dhanraj now co-hosts the Can't Be Censored podcast with former CP24 broadcaster Karman Wong.
