= Live at Five =

Live at Five or Live at 5 is a name used by several television stations to refer to their 5:00 pm newscasts or talk shows, including (but not limited to):

- Live at Five (WNBC TV series) in New York City, United States
- Live at 5, a CTV 2 Atlantic news operation in Halifax, Nova Scotia, Canada
- Live at 5 (Canadian TV program) in Toronto, Canada
- Live at Five (Sky News programme) in the United Kingdom
- Live at Five (STV2) in the United Kingdom
- Live at Five (TCMedia Ch. 22, 77) in Olympia Washington
