= The Brandon Gonez Show =

Online News TV show

- The Brandon Gonez Show
- Genre: Talk Show
- Created by: Brandon Gonez
- Starring: Brandon Gonez
- Country of origin: Canada
- Original language: English
- No. of seasons: 1
- No. of episodes: 42

Production
- Production location: Toronto
- Running time: 10-30 minutes
- Production company: Gonez Media Inc.

Original release
- Release: January 17, 2021 – present

The Brandon Gonez Show is a weekly online talk show, which debuted on January 17, 2021, on YouTube. The show is anchored by Canadian television personality Brandon Gonez, and focuses on national news stories in Canada covering political, social and entertainment topics. The kick off to the show was attended by Tessa Virtue, John Tory, Jagmeet Singh and other personalities.

The show was created by Brandon Gonez (b. Oct. 13, 1992) who had previously worked at local stations in Canada such as CFTK-TV and CFRE-DT. In 2017, Gonez began co-hosting the CTV national morning show Your Morning, but moved to the local Toronto station CP24 in 2019.

In January 2023, Gonez announced the acquisition of Now, a Toronto alternative weekly newspaper, following the bankruptcy of its prior parent corporation.
