= Nathan Downer =

Canadian television journalist

Nathan Downer is a Canadian television journalist, currently the co-anchor with Michelle Dubé of the 6 p.m. newscasts on CFTO-DT in Toronto, Ontario.

Previously a reporter and anchor for the all-news channel CP24, where he became known for an incident when boxer Mike Tyson unleashed a stream of profanities at him live on the air after he made reference to Tyson's prior rape conviction in a question. He was announced by CFTO as the new co-anchor of the 6 p.m. news in December 2019 following the retirement of Ken Shaw, presenting his first newscast as permanent anchor on January 7, 2020.

He is a three-time Canadian Screen Award nominee for Best Local Television Anchor, receiving nods at the 9th Canadian Screen Awards in 2021, the 10th Canadian Screen Awards in 2022, and the 11th Canadian Screen Awards in 2023.
