= Melissa Grelo =

Canadian television personality (born 1977)

Melissa Grelo (born June 30, 1977) is a Canadian television personality, best known as a co-host of CP24 Breakfast and the former moderator of The Social. Grelo has been a co-host of CTV's national morning show Your Morning, along with Ben Mulroney.

Her other roles have included co-anchoring CTV's Olympic Morning during the 2010 Winter Olympics, and Toronto's annual Santa Claus Parade. Melissa founded marQ, a gender neutral, kids clothing line named after her daughter, Marquesa.

In 2024, Melissa created her podcast "Aging Powerfully with Melissa Grelo" to demystify some of the challenges that Canadians face in mid-life. The Podcast has become a source of fact-based guidance from credible guests.

Originally a teacher, Grelo studied broadcast journalism at Seneca College after deciding to pursue a change of career. She subsequently worked as a reporter for CKVR-TV and CITY-TV before becoming cohost of CP24 Breakfast in 2009.

Grelo is of Portuguese and Filipina descent. With her husband Ryan Gaggi, Grelo gave birth to a girl, Marquesa, in 2014.

== Personal life ==
Grelo is of Portuguese and Filipina descent. She married Ryan Gaggi in 2008. After four years of fertility treatment at two clinics, Grelo conceived her daughter Marquesa naturally in 2014, the same year The Social was greenlit — a show she had helped develop and pitch. She returned to work eleven weeks after giving birth to co-host the show's launch. Grelo and her husband made a deliberate mutual decision to have one child, which she has discussed publicly as intentional rather than circumstantial.

Grelo's interests include travelling, reading, fitness training and horseback riding.
