= Live at 5:30 (Canadian TV program) =

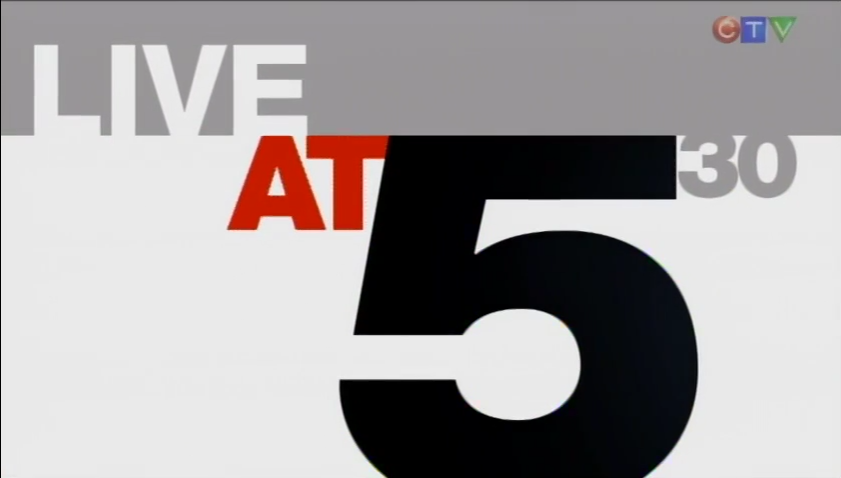
- Live at 5:30 opening as of September 27, 2012 being simulcasted to CFTO-DT
- Genre: News
- Country of origin: Canada
- Original language: English

Production
- Production location: Toronto

Original release
- Network: CP24
- Release: January 19, 2010

Related
- Live at 5 CP24 Breakfast

former open

Live at 5:30 is a Canadian television news program that airs weekdays on CP24 from 5:30 - 6:00 p.m. From July 2017 until November 2023, CTV Toronto also simulcast the program in addition to the earlier Live at 5.

== History ==
Live at 5:30 was created as a result of budget cuts at Rogers Media's Citytv stations across Canada, which included the cancellation of their 5 p.m. newscast for Toronto. The program first aired on January 19, 2010.

== Set ==
The CP24 studio is located at 9 Channel Nine Court. The set and newsroom is home to Live at 5:30 and most of the other CP24-produced programming.

== See also ==
- Live at 5 (Canadian TV program)
