= CFTO-DT =

Television station in Toronto

- Toronto, Ontario; Canada
- Channels: Digital: 8 (VHF); Virtual: 9
- Branding: CTV Toronto or CTV (general); CTV News Toronto (newscasts)

Programming
- Affiliations: 9.1: CTV

Ownership
- Owner: Bell Media Inc.
- Sister stations: TV: CP24, CKVR-DT (Barrie); Radio: CFRB, CHUM, CHUM-FM, CKFM-FM

History
- First air date: January 1, 1961
- Former call signs: CFTO-TV (1961–2011)
- Former channel numbers: Analog: 9 (VHF, 1961–2011); Digital: 40 (UHF, 2004–2011), 9 (VHF, 2011–2019)
- Former affiliations: Independent (1961)
- Call sign meaning: "Canada's Foremost, Toronto's Own"

Technical information
- Licensing authority: CRTC
- ERP: 10.2 kW
- HAAT: 467.0 m (1,532 ft)
- Transmitter coordinates: 43°38′33″N 79°23′14″W
- Translator(s): see § Transmitters

Links
- Website: CTV Toronto

CFTO-DT (channel 9, cable channel 8) is a television station in Toronto, Ontario, Canada, serving as the flagship station of the CTV Television Network, a division of Bell Media. It is sister to Barrie-based CTV2 flagship CKVR-DT, channel 3 (although the two stations maintain separate operations). CFTO-DT's studios are located at 9 Channel Nine Court in the former city of Scarborough, and its transmitter is located atop the CN Tower in Downtown Toronto. The station shares the Agincourt studio complex with CTV's national headquarters, which includes studios for the network's news programming (CTV National News and the CTV News Channel), along with most of Bell Media's specialty channels.

== History ==
The station first signed on the air at January 1, 1961. The inaugural program broadcast on CFTO was a telethon for the Ontario Association for Community Living, hosted by broadcaster Joel Aldred, complete with a fireworks ceremony.

The station was founded by Baton Aldred Rogers Broadcasting, a joint venture between Telegram Corporation (owned by the Bassett and Eaton families), Aldred-Rogers Broadcasting (owned by Joel Aldred and Ted Rogers), and Foster Hewitt Broadcasting, which owned radio station CKFH (1430 AM, now CJCL on 590 AM). The 'Baton' portion of the name was pronounced /ˌbætən/, rather than the conducting tool's traditional pronunciation.

A version from the early 1990s of CFTO's longtime multicoloured iris logo (designed by art director Joern Dressel), first introduced during the transition to colour television in 1965. It was unused for much of the 1980s in favour of a blue "circle 9" design before returning c. 1987. This version was later used as the basis for the logo used by the Baton Broadcast System.

The station's first children's show, shown on weekday afternoons, was The Professor's Hideaway, starring Stan Francis. American television network ABC held a minority share in the partnership, which it sold to each of the partners shortly before CFTO-TV went on the air. Ted Rogers' uncle J. Elsworth Rogers was a minority (and originally primary) owner of Western Ontario Broadcasting, Ltd., owners of CKLW-TV (now CBET) in Windsor, Ontario (which was mostly owned by RKO General). The station's original studio and transmitter facilities were located at 1550 McCowan Road, later renamed 9 Channel Nine Court.

CFTO's BBS logo.

In March 1961, Aldred sold his interest in the station, and on October 1 of that year, CFTO became a charter affiliate of CTV, as well as the network's flagship station. In 1970, Ted Rogers sold his interest in CFTO and the Bassett-Eaton group sold their interest in Rogers Cable in an exchange of assets. On May 31, 1976, CFTO began transmitting its signal from the CN Tower, while its studios remained in Agincourt. CFTO began broadcasting in stereo in 1985. In 1991, the station joined with several other Ontario stations to form Ontario Network Television, which evolved into the Baton Broadcast System, a subsystem within the CTV network. In 1995, CFTO began operating rebroadcast stations at Orillia (on UHF channel 21) and Bobcaygeon (near Peterborough, on UHF channel 54).

CFTO-TV logo used from 1998 to 2005. In October 2005, logos with the stations' callsigns were discontinued from use on CTV's stations, instead opting to use the main CTV logo.

When CTV's stations proposed to buy the network and run it as a cooperative in 1966, the Board of Broadcast Governors initially balked at the proposal. CFTO was by far the largest, richest and most profitable station (it was more than double the size of the next-largest station, CFCF-TV in Montreal). This led to fears that CFTO would dominate a station-owned network. The BBG was only appeased when the station owners promised that each owner would have an equal vote, regardless of how large it was. As it turned out, though, Baton gradually grew powerful enough that it was able to buy controlling interest in CTV in 1997, changing its name to CTV Inc. in 1998.

On January 27, 1998, the Eaton family sold its 41% interest in CTV. On that same day, the Baton Broadcast System merged into CTV. With rumours of an impending takeover, Bell Canada proposed to buy CTV Inc. for $2.3 billion; this was approved by the CTV board in March 2000. The deal still required approval from the Canadian Radio-television and Telecommunications Commission (CRTC), but with the promise of the largest benefits package ever presented to the regulators, the deal was approved on December 7 that year. By February 2005, the station stopped using its call letters in its on-air branding (opting to use the "CTV" name), a branding convention that became official on several CTV stations throughout the country in October 2005. BCE later sold most of its interest in CTV, with the parent company being renamed CTVglobemedia. BCE Inc. later reacquired 100% control of CTVglobemedia's assets for $1.3 billion in 2011, with the parent company being renamed once again to Bell Media.

== Programming ==
As CFTO serves as CTV's flagship station, its schedule is virtually identical to the CTV network schedule. A largely identical schedule is used on the other CTV stations in Southern Ontario, CJOH in Ottawa and CKCO in Kitchener, as CFTO acts as master control for these stations. Any discrepancies with other stations would generally be limited to local infomercials and religious programming on Sunday mornings.

=== Other station productions ===
Under CTV's original cooperative structure, CFTO, through Baton's in-house production company Glen-Warren Productions, was one of the network's main contributors of Canadian programming, such as The Littlest Hobo, Circus and The Uncle Bobby Show. Indeed, the amount of programming originating at CFTO was often a source of tension with the network's other major-market affiliates. However, as with most local stations in North America, such locally produced non-news programming has become increasingly rare.

For much of its history, CFTO's Channel Nine Court studios have also served as the home for network-produced programs such as CTV National News, Canada AM and W5. The studios are now also used by a number of CTV's specialty channels, for productions such as the cable news channel CTV News Channel, TSN's SportsCentre, and Discovery Channel's Daily Planet.

Over the years, the studio complex has also been rented out for third-party productions, such as the studio scenes in the 1976 film Network. The Lotto 6/49 and Lotto Super 7 (now Lotto Max) drawings were also held at the CFTO studios until 2008. Since 2010, CFTO and CP24 have been the television broadcasters for the Toronto Santa Claus Parade.

== News operation ==
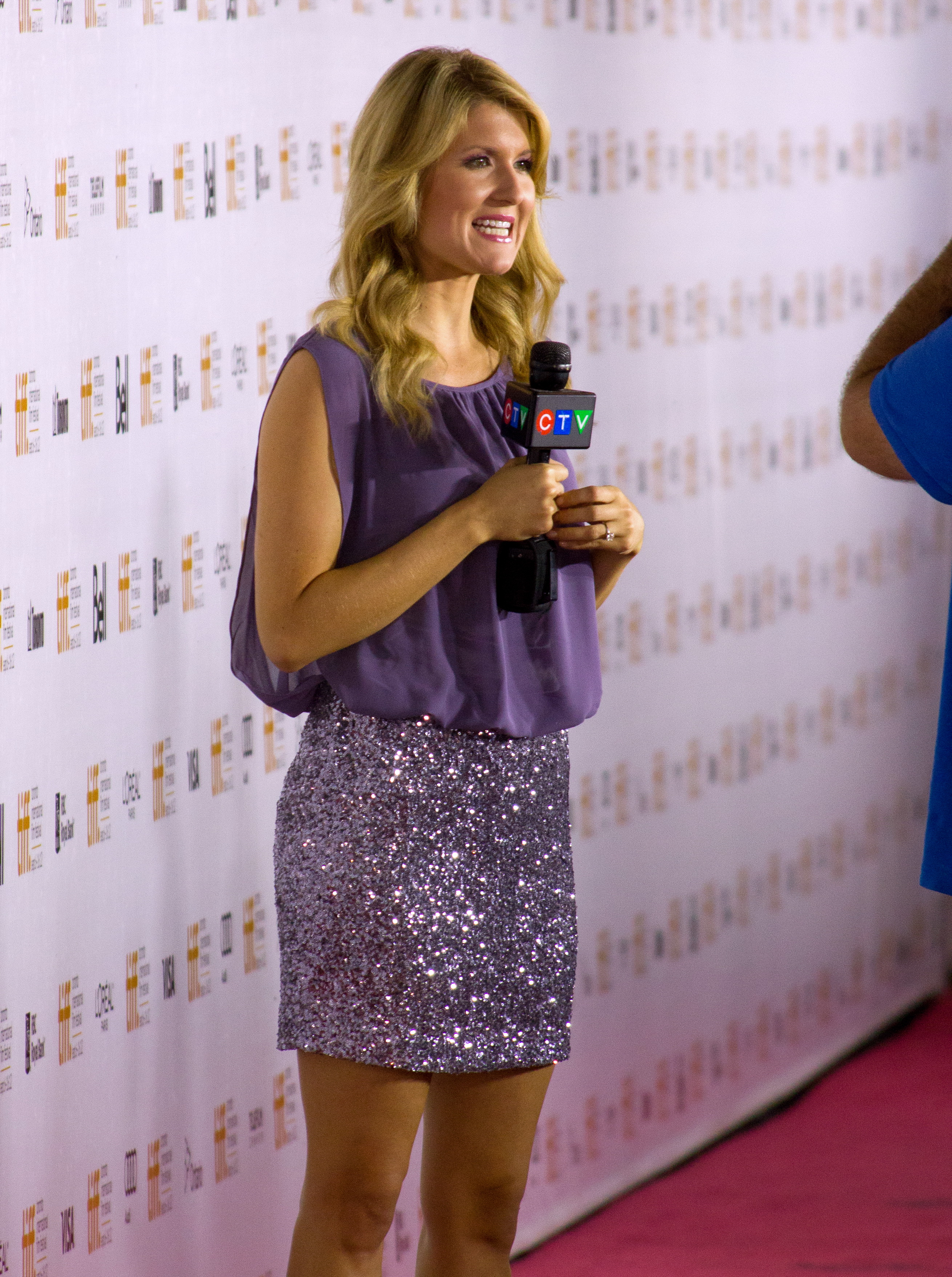
Michelle Dubé doing a report during the 2012 Toronto International Film Festival.

CFTO-DT presently broadcasts 15 1/2 hours of locally produced newscasts each week (with 2 1/2 hours each weekday and 1 1/2 hours each on Saturdays and Sundays). With the exception of its CP24 simulcasts, the station brands its newscasts as CTV News Toronto, in line with all of CTV's other owned-and-operated stations as well as the CTV2 stations, using generic CTV News graphics. The station's flagship 6 p.m. newscast is the highest-rated local newscast in Canada. Known beginning in the 1970s as World Beat News (for its early evening newscast), Noon Beat News (for its lunch hour newscast) and Night Beat News (for its late evening newscast), the station's newscasts were rebranded as CFTO News in early 1998, and as CTV News in 2005.

Logo used for news programs

In December 2008, CP24, a 24-hour news channel which primarily focuses on Toronto, began airing a simulcast of CTV News at Six, displacing its simulcast of the 6 p.m. edition of CityNews. This change occurred because the long-standing association between CITY-TV (channel 57) and CP24 (which were previously both owned by CHUM Limited) abruptly came to an end after the CRTC announced the approval of their application by Rogers Media, owners of Citytv, to launch its own 24-hour local news channel which would be focusing on the Greater Toronto Area, CityNews Channel; like CFTO, CP24 is operated by Bell Media, although the operations between the two remain otherwise separate. The station's late evening newscast, CTV News at 11:30, was later added to the CP24 schedule in May 2009. On May 12, 2009, CFTO began broadcasting its local newscasts in high definition; with the change, the station introduced a renovated studio.

Starting in July 2017, CFTO began simulcasting CP24's Live at 5 and Live at 5:30 as part of an expansion of local news programming across Bell Media stations. Unlike CP24, these newscasts are broadcast in full screen without any information sidebars.

=== Notable current on-air staff ===
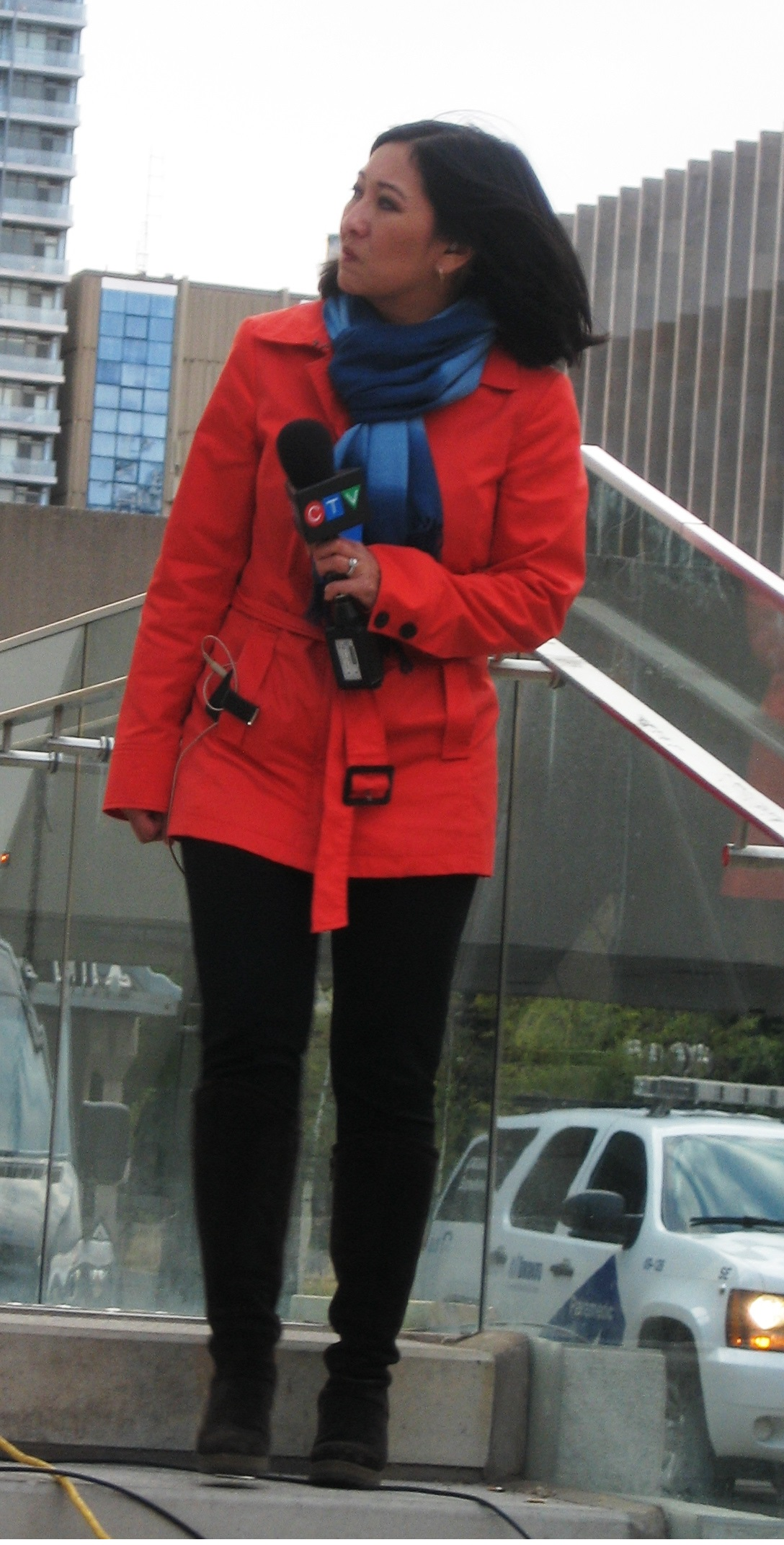
Zuraidah Alman at Nathan Phillips Square during the 2015 American League Division Series between the Toronto Blue Jays and Texas Rangers in October 2015.

- Nathan Downer – weekday co-anchor, CTV News at Six
- Michelle Dubé – weekday co-anchor, CTV News at Six

=== Notable former on-air staff ===
- Christine Bentley – CTV News at Six anchor and reporter (1977–2012)
- Dave Devall – weather specialist reporter (1961–2009)
- Tom Gibney – CTV News at Six anchor (1973–2007)
- Gord Martineau – reporter (brief stint)
- Bernie McNamee – reporter (1985–1989)
- Ken Shaw – weekday co-anchor, CTV News at Six and CTV News at Noon (2001–2020), special reporter
- Ali Velshi – reporter

== Technical information ==
=== Subchannel ===
Subchannel of CFTO-DT
Subchannel	Res.	Short name	Programming
9.1	1080i	CFTO	CTV

=== Analog-to-digital conversion ===
The station began providing a digital signal on satellite on November 17, 2003, and on January 30, 2004, CFTO was granted an over-the-air digital television signal, transmitting on UHF channel 40 at an effective radiated power of 17,400 watts. In mid-2005, CFTO upgraded its digital signal to transmit programming in high definition. CFTO shut down its analog signal, over VHF channel 9, on August 31, 2011, the official date on which Canadian television stations in CRTC-designated mandatory markets transitioned from analog to digital broadcasts. The station's digital signal was relocated from its pre-transition UHF channel 40 to its analog-era VHF channel 9 for post-transition operations. On April 29, 2019, CTV updated broadcast channels for stations in Toronto, Victoria, and Windsor. CFTO moved to VHF channel 8, but retained virtual channel 9.

=== Transmitters ===
Station	City of licence	Channel (RF / VC)	ERP	HAAT	Transmitter coordinates
CFTO-DT-21	Orillia	21 (UHF); 21	207.6 kW	171.3 m (562 ft)	44°52′4″N 79°35′41″W
CFTO-DT-54	Peterborough	35 (UHF); 54	38 kW	176.3 m (578 ft)	44°26′44″N 78°31′59″W

CFTO-TV-21 and a long list of CTV rebroadcasters nationwide were to shut down on or before August 31, 2009, as part of a political dispute with Canadian authorities on paid fee-for-carriage requirements for cable television operators. A subsequent change in ownership assigned full control of CTVglobemedia to Bell Media; as of 2011, these transmitters continue to be licensed and remain in operation. Just after midnight on June 23, 2019, the Orillia transmitter was converted to digital.
