= Ken Shaw =

Canadian television journalist and anchor

Ken Shaw OOnt
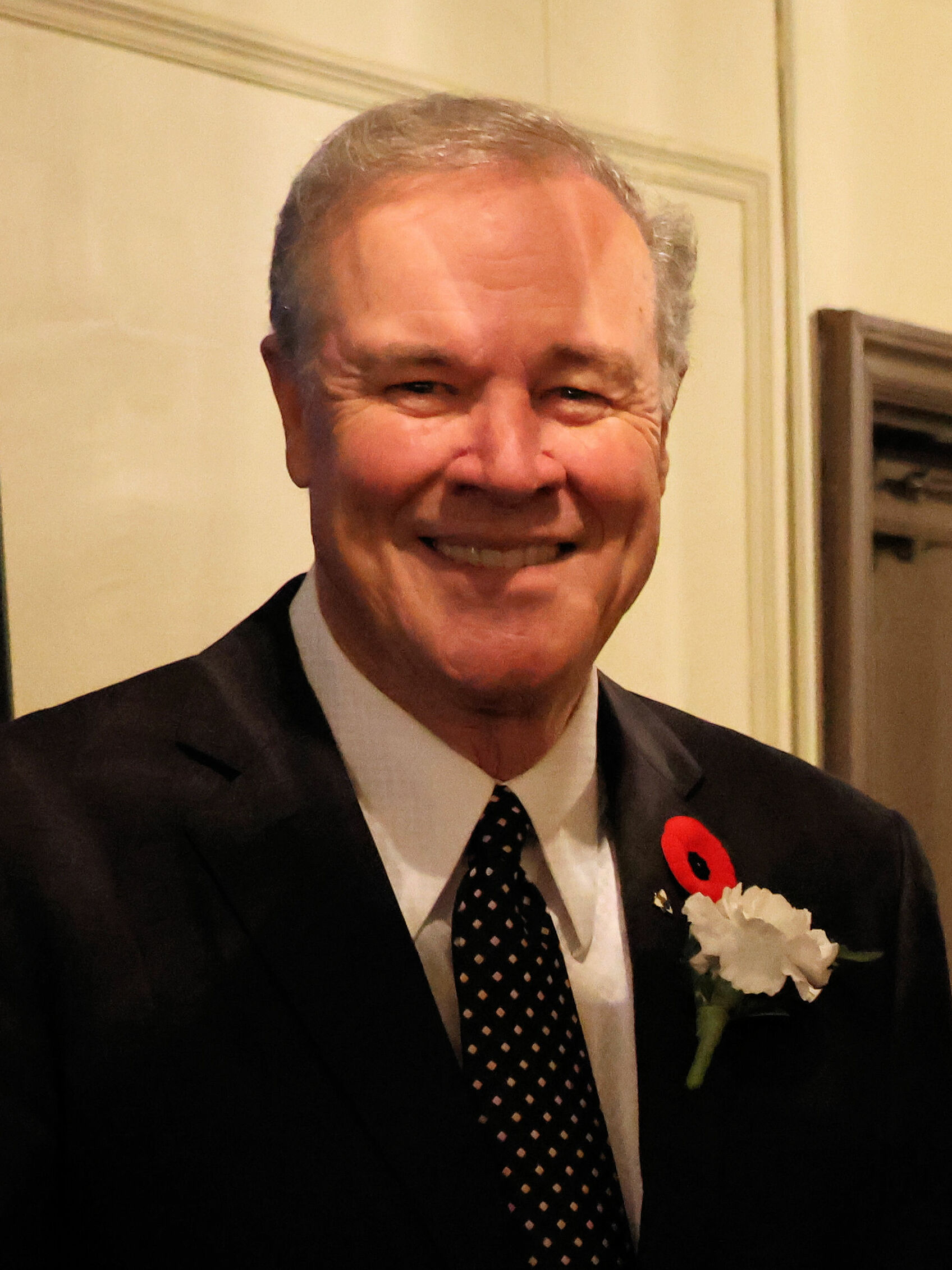
- Shaw in 2023
- Occupations: Journalist, news presenter
- Employer: Bell Media

Ken Shaw, OOnt is a Canadian journalist who works for Bell Media. He worked as a news anchor on the noon and 6:00 p.m. news segments for CTV Toronto. He announced his retirement on December 7, 2019 and anchored his last newscast on January 6, 2020.

Shaw joined CTV Toronto as a reporter in 1979, while at the same time reporting on major Canadian news stories for American network news programs including ABC's Good Morning America, Nightline, and NBC's The Today Show. He started anchoring the 11:30 news at CTV in 1981, and was named the National Editor in 1998. From 1999 to 2001, he was weekday anchor for CTV News Channel. Prior to his television career, Shaw worked at local radio station CHFI-FM.

At the 2008 Canadian Association of Broadcasters (CAB) Convention, Shaw was the recipient of the 2008 Gold Ribbon Award for Outstanding Community Service by an Individual Broadcaster. This award recognizes broadcasters who are devoted to enhancing and giving back to their communities. On January 25, 2010, it was announced that Shaw would be appointed to the Order of Ontario for his philanthropic work. In 2012, Shaw received an honorary Doctor of Laws from Ontario Tech University.

In 2014, Shaw won the Canadian Screen Award for Best Local News Anchor at the 2nd Canadian Screen Awards.
