= Ann Rohmer =

Canadian television personality (born 1958)

- Born: Ann Margaret Rohmer; March 2, 1958 (age 67); Toronto, Ontario, Canada
- Occupation: Television personality
- Spouse: Steve Podborski (m. 1984; div. 1986)
- Parents: Richard Rohmer (father); Mary Olivia Whiteside (mother)

Ann Margaret Rohmer (born March 2, 1958) is a Canadian television personality known for her work on Citytv and CP24 in Toronto, Ontario, Canada.

== Early life and career ==
Rohmer's father is Richard Rohmer, an officer with the Royal Canadian Air Force. She grew up in Don Mills. Her mother was Mary Olivia Whiteside Rohmer, a grade school teacher.

Rohmer was trained by top figure skating coach Sheldon Galbraith, Rohmer competed at the provincial level until she was involved in a car accident at the age of 14. Although this ended her skating career, it has not stopped her from playing tennis, being an aerobics instructor and participating in both water and downhill skiing.

For her primary and secondary education, Rohmer attended the Branksome Hall all-girls private school before transferring to the public Northern Secondary School in her final year of high school, graduating in 1974. As a university student, she began acting in television commercials as a means of earning extra money. Her desire to write and edit the scripts sparked a desire to work as a television presenter.

During the 1970s, she worked as a flight attendant for Air Canada.

== Television career ==
In 1979, she landed her first major television gig hosting the syndicated program ShowBiz where she interviewed celebrities. Afterwards, she was hired by the Global Television Network as a co-host on the magazine show That's Life which lasted from 1983 to 1987. Rohmer was then hired as a sports anchor for CBC; following that she was a features reporter on CTV's Canada AM for two years.

In 1986, she joined Citytv as the CityPulse Weekend sports anchor. In 1989, she became the original host of Breakfast Television.

In October 2001, Rohmer moved to CP24 where she became news anchor and also hosted City Online, a daily interactive talk show after CityNews at Noon that gave viewers the chance to comment on specific news. In February 2002, she also took on hosting duties for CP24's new real estate show, Hot Property. She has also hosted Animal House Calls. Rohmer sometimes filled-in as host of HomePage for Jee-Yun Lee and Perfect Fit for Tonya Rouse.

She also anchored the new CP24 program More On CP24 (added news coverage during commercial breaks of Citytv's Breakfast Television), the 'Live at Noon' newscast and various CP24 weekday talk shows. In March 2009 she began hosting CP24 Breakfast.

In June 2010, Rohmer resigned her primary duties at CP24. She received an on-air sendoff and a massive party to celebrate her career at the station. Her new position was supposed to be outside broadcasting. But in the fall of 2010, she returned to her regular weekday morning anchoring duties at CP24. CP24 did not address the reason for her return, or even the fact that she had returned to the anchor desk. She continued to host Animal House Calls and Hot Property.

In November 2015, Rohmer announced her retirement on CP24 after 35 years of broadcasting, and 17 years at CP24. In 2016 however, she returned to CP24 as a fill-in anchor for a year before leaving for a final time in 2017.

== After CP24 ==
Rohmer was the co-host of Context Beyond The Headlines, a program produced by Crossroads Christian Communications, for the 2019/2020 season.

She currently hosts two shows on York Region radio station CFMS-FM, The Feed, a weekly local newsmagazine show covering York Region, and interview show In Conversation with Ann Rohmer.

On August 19, 2022, she registered to run as a candidate for Toronto City Council but ended her campaign on August 28 due to "unforeseen family issues". Her name remained on the ballot, however, as the deadline to withdraw had passed.

== Personal life ==
Rohmer has married and divorced three times, including to Canadian downhill skier and Olympic medallist Steve Podborski: they were married from 1984 until their divorce in 1986.

== Awards ==
Rohmer has received the following awards:

- 1999, following an appearance as a Sunshine Girl, was voted by the Toronto Sun as one of the "10 Sexiest Women" in Toronto.
- 1994 and 1999 voted by the Toronto Sun as one of Toronto's favourite television personalities.
- 1998 Variety Children's Charity Outstanding Community Volunteer.
- Nominated for ACTRA's Best Newcomer of the Year.
- Gordon Sinclair Award for Excellence in Broadcasting.
- 2001 Escoffier Society Media Award.
