= Your Morning =

Canadian breakfast television program

- Also known as: CTV Your Morning (2022–present)
- Genre: Morning show
- Presented by: Anne-Marie Mediwake
- Theme music composer: Stephan Moccio
- Country of origin: Canada

Production
- Executive producer: Jennifer MacLean
- Production locations: 299 Queen Street West; Toronto, Ontario
- Running time: 3 hours
- Production company: Bell Media

Original release
- Network: CTV; CTV News Channel
- Release: August 22, 2016 – present

Related
- Canada AM; CTV Morning Live

Your Morning is a Canadian breakfast television program that is broadcast on CTV and CTV News Channel. It debuted on August 22, 2016 and airs live from 6-9 a.m. in the Eastern Time Zone and simulcast elsewhere in Canada according to local scheduling. In some areas of Canada, the program is pre-empted in favour of a local edition.

The program is hosted by Anne-Marie Mediwake, along with contributors Lindsey Deluce (news anchor), and Kelsey McEwen (weather) from CTV's street-front studios at Bell Media Queen Street in Downtown Toronto.

== History ==
The program was announced in June 2016 as the network's replacement for the network's long-running morning show, Canada AM, whose cancellation was announced the previous week. While Canada AM was produced at the network's 9 Channel Nine Court facility in Scarborough and was under the auspices of CTV News until October 2015, Your Morning is produced from the downtown Toronto studios at 299 Queen Street West, by Bell Media In-House Productions (later rebranded Bell Media Studios), the division responsible for CTV's daytime lifestyle programming including The Social and The Marilyn Denis Show.

Similarities to Canada AM include news reports, a weather segment (this time without additional local weather information after the segment), a cooking segment and occasional music performances. Like Canada AM, Your Morning is a 3-hour long program, with local news opt-outs every half-hour which may be filled by local CTV stations. Your Morning's Executive Producer is Jennifer MacLean, a former Senior Producer for Canada AM. The show's original production team included several producers who had previously worked on Canada AM, including Kristen Rynax, Paul Hughes, Katie Jamieson, Trish Bradley, Emily English, Tyler McFadden and Shannon Crown.

Your Morning premiered on August 22, 2016, with Ben Mulroney and Anne-Marie Mediwake as co-hosts. The first show included an interview with Prime Minister Justin Trudeau and a live music performance from American country music duo Florida Georgia Line. The theme music was composed by Stephan Moccio.

On October 1, 2021, Mulroney left the program and network in order to develop other projects.

During its 2025 upfronts, Bell Media announced the local CTV Morning Live broadcasts would be rebranded under the Your Morning title in September 2025, remaining locally-produced.

== Local editions ==
CTV Morning Live logo used from 2011 to 2018

Local editions of Your Morning air in place of the national edition on CTV's owned-and-operated stations in Western Canada, specifically, Vancouver, Calgary, Edmonton, Saskatoon, Regina and Winnipeg as well as on CTV 2 stations in Ottawa and Atlantic Canada. It first premiered as CTV Morning Live on CHRO in Ottawa and CTV Two Atlantic on August 29, 2011.

The CTV Morning Live branding launched on August 29, 2011, following the rebranding of the A television system as CTV Two; it replaced A Morning on CJOH/Ottawa, and Breakfast Television on CTV Two Atlantic. In the weeks that followed, CTV began to launch local morning newscasts under the branding on its stations in Western Canada, replacing its existing national morning show Canada AM (which would remain available nationally via a simulcast on the CTV News Channel). The new programs would compete primarily with local editions of Global News Morning and Breakfast Television.

On September 15, 2025, the programs were rebranded as CTV Your Morning (region), as part of an effort to unify its branding with the national Your Morning show. The programs remain produced by the local CTV station, but Bell stated that the change would allow it "to work with advertisers on both national and locally focused opportunities". As before, the programs continue to only air on CTV stations in Western Canada, with the national edition of Your Morning airing on CTV stations in the east.

- Ottawa - CTV 2 Ottawa
- Atlantic Canada - CTV 2 Atlantic
- Winnipeg - CTV Winnipeg
- Saskatchewan - CTV Saskatoon (also simulcast on CTV Prince Albert), CTV Regina (also simulcast on CTV Yorkton)
  - CTV Morning Live Regina and CTV Morning Live Saskatoon were separate shows prior to September 14, 2024.
- Calgary - CTV Calgary
- Edmonton - CTV Edmonton
- Vancouver - CTV Vancouver

== Availability ==
As of September 2019, a portion of the national program can be seen live at 3 AM PT/5 AM CT on CTV's owned-and-operated stations in Western Canada, immediately followed by the local Your Morning editions. This means, for example, viewers watching CTV Winnipeg will see the first hour of Your Morning at 5 AM CT, followed by Your Morning Winnipeg at 6 AM CT. Meanwhile, viewers in Vancouver can watch the first 2.5 hours of the program on CTV Vancouver starting at 3 AM PT, followed by Your Morning Vancouver at 5:30 AM PT.

Until its closure, CTV's only affiliate in Western Canada, CITL-DT Lloydminster, broadcast Your Morning on a tape delay from 6-9 AM MT.

Previously, as with Canada AM, the program was not broadcast on the western CTV O&O stations. It also did not air on three stations owned by Corus Entertainment which were affiliated with CTV from 2015 to 2018.

== Your Kids, Their Questions ==
On May 9, 2020, the Your Morning team produced and aired Your Kids, Their Questions: A Your Morning Coronavirus Special, a one-hour prime time special educating children about issues around the COVID-19 pandemic in Canada. The special won the Canadian Screen Award for Best Children's or Youth Non-Fiction Program or Series at the 9th Canadian Screen Awards in 2021.

== On-air staff ==
=== Current ===
- Anne-Marie Mediwake – host (2016–present)
- Lindsey Deluce – news anchor (2016–present)
- Kelsey McEwen – chief meteorologist (2016–present)
- Winston Sih
- Radheyan Simonpillai – film critic
- Teddy Wilson - news anchor (alternate)
- Michelle Jobin - Weather Specialist and News Anchor (2019 - present) (alternate)

=== Former ===
- Ben Mulroney – co-host (2016–2021)
- Priya Sam (2018–2019)
- Brandon Gonez (2017–2019)
- Melissa Grelo – entertainment (2016–present)
- Sonia Mangat - weather specialist
- Jessica Smith – weather specialist (2021)

== Controversy ==
=== Removal of fact-checking segment ===
On March 25, 2025, journalist Rachel Gilmore appeared on Your Morning during what was to be a new weekly "election misinformation" fact-checking segment called "Fact-Check Friday." On March 31, 2025, following online backlash from Pierre Poilievre's Conservative party and right-wing alternative media outlets including the Western Standard, the segment was pulled by executive producer Jennifer MacLean. According to MacLean, CTV was aware the segment would generate "some sort of reaction", but they did not "realize the extent of the volume" of it. The audio recording of the phone call with CTV was posted by Gilmore on April 1, 2025. PEN Canada expressed deep concern about the segment's cancellation calling it a "disservice to CTV's own audience, who deserve access to accurate, fact-checked information during an election." On April 3, 2025, Gilmore announced a new bi-weekly fact-checking segment with Canada's National Observer.
