= Economy of Atlanta =

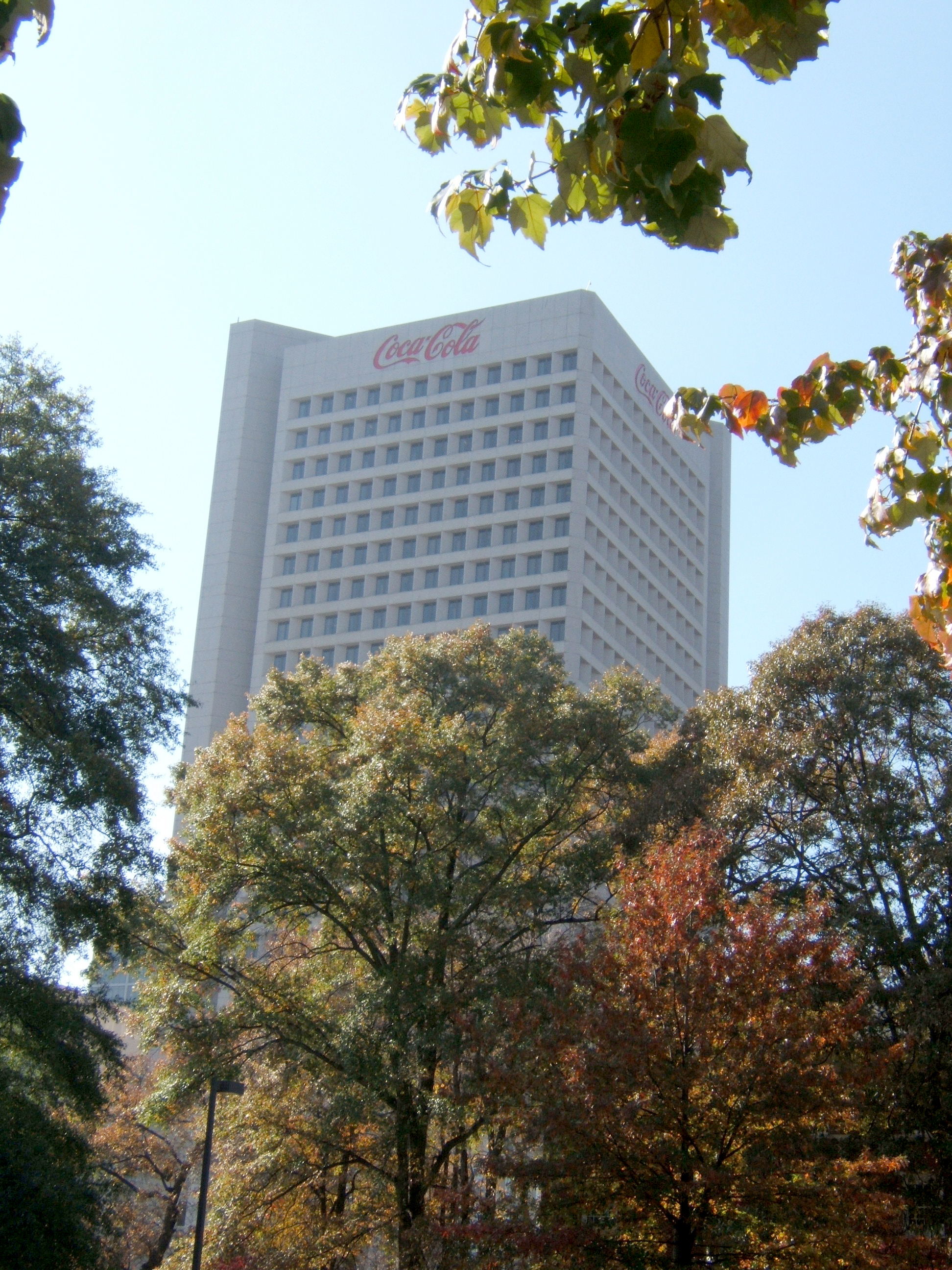
The Coca-Cola world headquarters

The Atlanta economy is the 10th largest in the country and 18th in the world with an estimated 2014 GDP of over $324 billion. Atlanta is one of ten U.S. cities classified as an "alpha-world city" by a 2010 study at Loughborough University, and has ranked fourth in the number of Fortune 500 companies headquartered within city boundaries, behind New York City, Houston, and Dallas. Several major national and international companies are headquartered in metro Atlanta, including seven Fortune 100 companies: The Coca-Cola Company, Home Depot, United Parcel Service, Delta Air Lines, AT&T Mobility, and Newell Rubbermaid. Other headquarters for some major companies in Atlanta and around the metro area include Arby's, Chick-fil-A, Earthlink, Equifax, First Data, Foundation Financial Group, Gentiva Health Services, Georgia-Pacific, NCR, Oxford Industries, RaceTrac Petroleum, Rheem Manufacturing Company, Southern Company, Mirant, and Waffle House. Over 75% of the Fortune 1000 companies have a presence in the Atlanta area, and the region hosts offices of about 1,250 multinational corporations. As of 2006 Atlanta Metropolitan Area ranks as the 10th largest cybercity (high-tech center) in the US, with 126,700 high-tech jobs.

== Dominant sectors ==
The top employment sectors in Metro Atlanta are (November 2011, excludes agriculture):

Sector	Employees (thousands)
Trade, transportation, and utilities	530.3
Professional and business services	391.4
Government	311.9
Education and health services	282.3
Leisure and hospitality	218.3
Manufacturing	146.5
Financial activities	128.5
Other services	90.5
Construction	83.9
Information	73.7
Mining and logging	1.4

== Finance ==
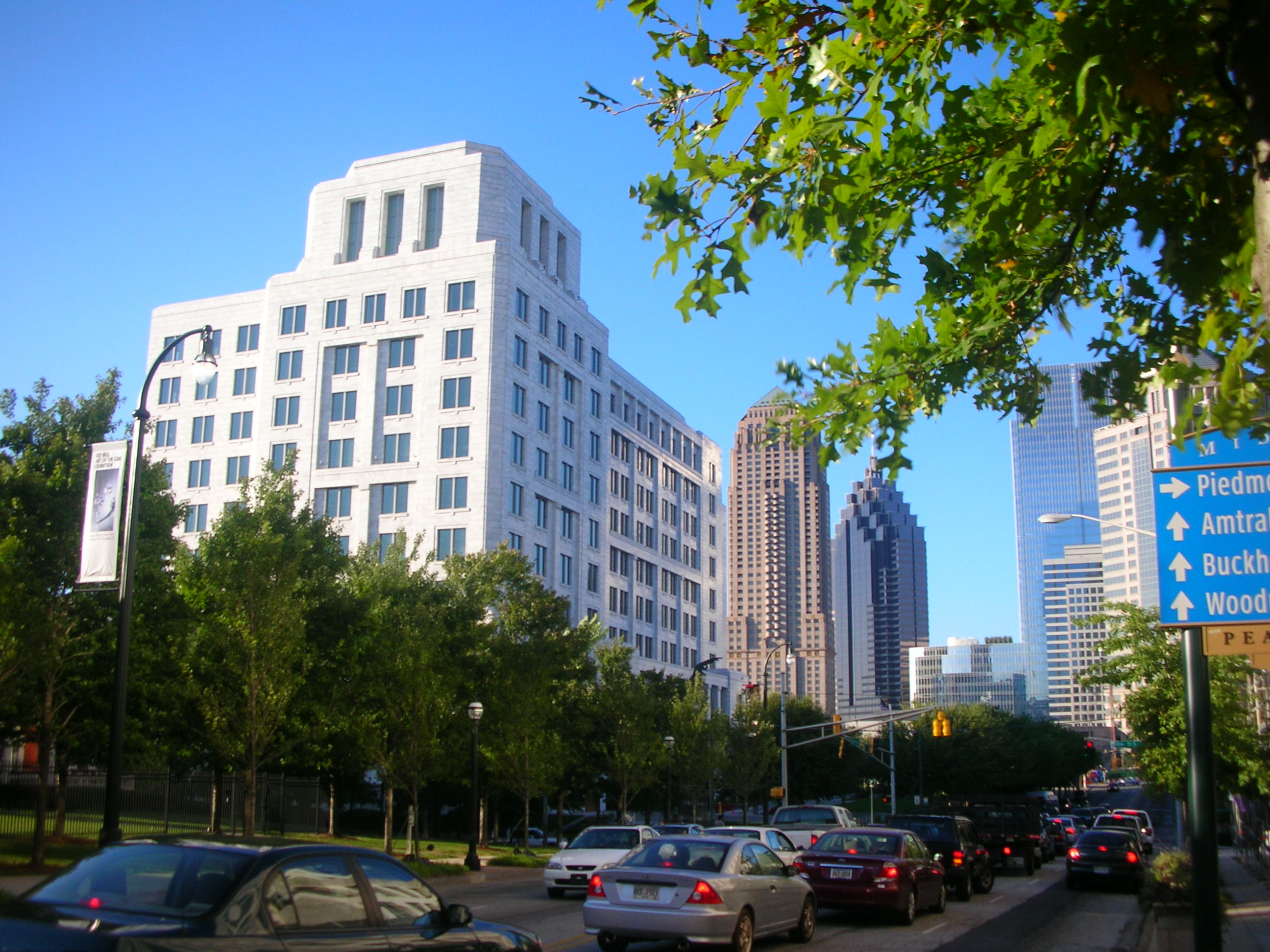
Federal Reserve Bank in Midtown Atlanta.

Atlanta has a sizable financial sector. The Federal Reserve System has a district headquarters in Atlanta; the Federal Reserve Bank of Atlanta, which oversees much of the deep South, relocated from downtown to Midtown in 2001. Wachovia announced plans in August 2006 to place its new credit-card division in Atlanta, and city, state and civic leaders harbor long-term hopes of having the city serve as the home of the secretariat of a future Free Trade Area of the Americas. Before being acquired by BB&T in 2019, SunTrust Banks, the seventh largest bank by asset holdings in the United States, had its home office on Peachtree Street in downtown.

Invesco, an investment management company, has its principal executive offices at Midtown Union in Atlanta, and has branch offices in 20 countries.

== Healthcare and biomedical ==
Atlanta has a growing hi-tech community and is also home to a growing Biotechnology sector, gaining recognition through such events as the 2009 BIO International Convention. Atlanta is also the headquarters of the Nuclear Regulatory Commission Region II.

Adjacent to Emory University, the city is also home to the Centers for Disease Control and Prevention (CDC), with a staff of nearly 15,000 including: engineers, entomologists, epidemiologists, biologists, physicians, veterinarians, behavioral scientists, nurses, medical technologists, economists, health communicators, toxicologists, chemists, computer scientists, and statisticians. CDC has 10 other offices throughout the United States and Puerto Rico, and other staff in 45 countries around the world.

== Manufacturing ==
The auto manufacturing sector in metropolitan Atlanta has suffered setbacks recently, including the closure of the General Motors Doraville Assembly plant in 2008, and the shutdown of Ford's Atlanta Assembly plant in Hapeville in 2006. Kia, however, has opened a new assembly plant near West Point. Hyco International Inc, one of the world's largest manufacturers of hydraulic cylinders, is headquartered in Atlanta.

Kitchen decor company Appliance Art, Inc. is based in Atlanta. It was founded in 2008 by Grant T. Smith.

== Media and communications ==
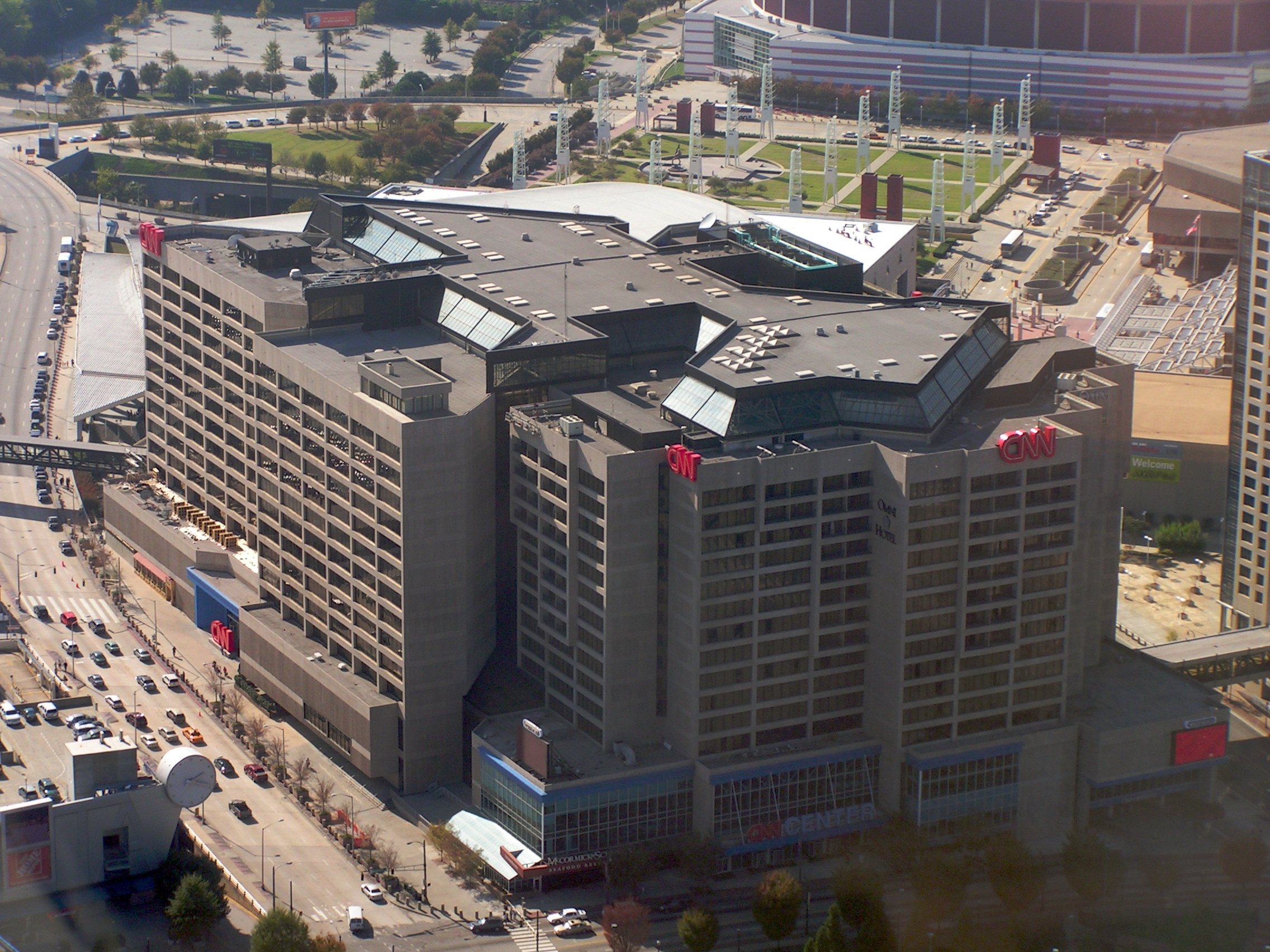
CNN Center

The city is a major cable television programming center. Ted Turner began the Turner Broadcasting System media empire in Atlanta, where he bought a UHF station that eventually became WTBS. Turner established the headquarters of the Cable News Network at CNN Center, adjacent today to Centennial Olympic Park. As his company grew, its other channels—the Cartoon Network, Boomerang, TNT, Turner South, Turner Classic Movies, CNN International, CNN en Español, HLN, and CNN Airport Network—centered their operations in Atlanta as well (Turner South has since been sold). Turner Broadcasting is a division of WarnerMedia. In 2008 Tyler Perry established his studios in Southwest Atlanta; and in 2010 EUE/Screen Gems opened soundstages in Lakewood Heights, south Atlanta. (See also: Film industry in Georgia) The Weather Channel, owned by a consortium of NBC Universal, Blackstone Group, and Bain Capital, has its offices in the Cumberland district northwest of downtown Atlanta.

Cox Enterprises, a privately held company controlled by James C. Kennedy, his sister Blair Parry-Okeden and their aunt Anne Cox Chambers, has substantial media holdings in and beyond Atlanta; it is headquartered in the city of Sandy Springs. Its Cox Communications division, headquartered in unincorporated DeKalb County, is the third-largest cable television service provider in the United States.

== Film and television ==
Atlanta has gained recognition as being a center of TV and film production, it being determined by Gocompare.com to be in the top 10 of the most popular cities in the world where films and TV shows have been filmed. Atlanta is a major center of television production and is the hub of the nation's third-largest film industry. Atlanta counts the presence of Techwood Studios, which produces content for the Turner Broadcasting family of stations; since 2008 the Tyler Perry Studios in Southwest Atlanta; and since 2010 the Cinespace Film Studios soundstages in Lakewood Heights, south Atlanta. Atlanta is the setting for popular TV shows such as the Real Housewives of Atlanta and Tyler Perry's series. Due to Perry, the "Housewives", and others, Atlanta is also known as a center of black entertainment in the U.S.

Films set in Atlanta include two pictures that were awarded the Oscar for Best Picture:, Gone with the Wind (1939) and Driving Miss Daisy (1989). Other films set in Atlanta include Little Darlings (1980), Sharky's Machine (1981), Outbreak (1995), Tyler Perry's Meet the Browns (2008), Life as We Know It (2010), Contagion (2011), and Baby Driver (2017).

Well-known television shows set in Atlanta include House of Payne and Tyler Perry's Meet the Browns from Tyler Perry Studios, The Real Housewives of Atlanta, the CBS sitcom Designing Women, and numerous HGTV original productions. Since moving to BET for the 2011 season, The Game - as of January 2012 the highest rated ad-supported sitcom ever on cable - has been shot in Atlanta. Williams Street Productions has produced multiple Adult Swim series as well as Freaknik: The Musical at their Midtown Atlanta studios.

=== Horror and zombie themes ===
Atlanta is the filming location for many horror-themed productions, including the TV series Goosebumps and its sequel Goosebumps 2: Haunted Halloween, Teen Wolf, The Walking Dead, Vampire Diaries, and the 2009 comedy Zombieland. In addition, the Atlanta Horror Fest is held yearly in October, and features the Buried Alive Film Fest, bands, and a zombie walk. These factors prompted Atlanta magazine to dub the city the "Zombie Capital of the World", and The New York Times to recognize Atlanta's stature in the genre.

== Logistics ==
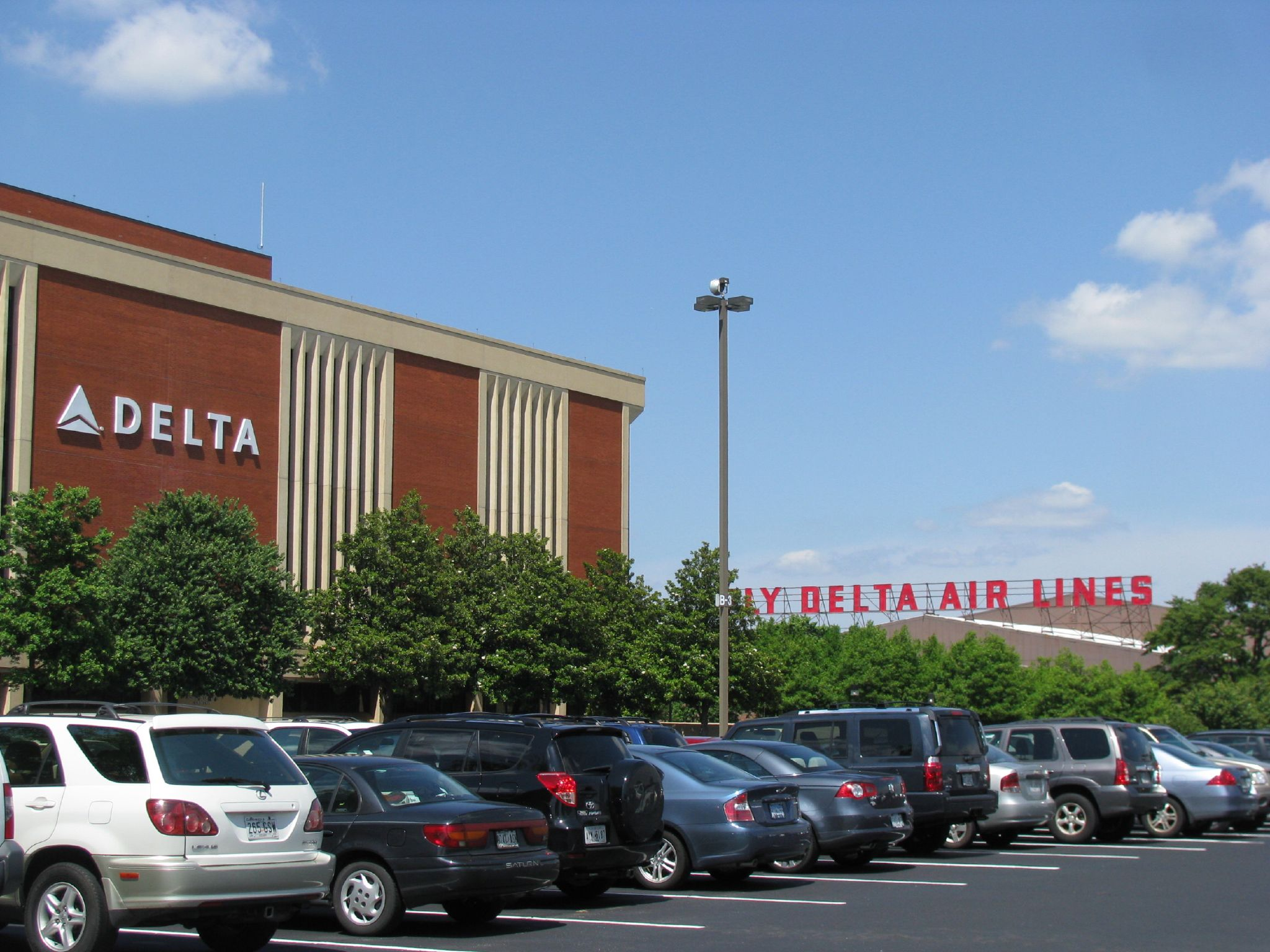
Delta Air Lines headquarters

Delta Air Lines is the largest employer in the Atlanta metro area. Their 34,500 Atlanta-based employees include airport staff, flight crews, and those who work at the headquarters adjacent to the airport. Delta operates the world's largest airline hub at Hartsfield-Jackson Atlanta International Airport and, together with the hub of competing carrier Southwest Airlines, has helped make Hartsfield-Jackson the world's busiest airport, both in terms of passenger traffic and aircraft operations. The airport, since its construction in the 1950s, has served as a key engine of Atlanta's economic growth.

== Top employers in Metro Atlanta ==
Employer	Number of employees
Delta Air Lines	34,500
Emory University / Emory Healthcare	32,095
The Home Depot	16,510
Northside Hospital	16,000+
Piedmont Healthcare	15,900
Publix	14,753
Wellstar Health System	15,353
Kroger	15,000+
AT&T	15,000
United Parcel Service	14,594
Marriott International	12,000+
Children's Healthcare of Atlanta	9,000
Cox Enterprises	8,894
Centers for Disease Control and Prevention	8,403
The Coca-Cola Company	8,000
Southern Company	7,753
Grady Health System	7,600
SunTrust Banks	7,478
Georgia Tech	7,139
State Farm	6,000
Turner Broadcasting System	6,000

Source: Metro Atlanta Chamber of Commerce, Top 25 Metro Atlanta Employers (2018–2019)

== List of companies headquartered in Metro Atlanta ==
The following is a list of the most notable companies that were founded or have their corporate headquarters in Atlanta or the surrounding metro area.

- Aaron's, Inc.
- Acuity Brands
- Adecco (USA)
- AGCO Corporation (Duluth)
- AGL Resources
- AirWatch
- Alston & Bird
- American Cancer Society
- American Megatrends (unincorporated Gwinnett County)
- Apollo Vredestein (USA)
- Arby's
- Arden's Garden
- Arcapita
- Asbury Automotive Group
- AT&T Mobility in Lenox Park (Brookhaven, Georgia)
- The Athlete's Foot
- Atlanta Bread Company
- Atlantis Plastics
- Axiall (formerly Georgia Gulf)
- Beazer Homes USA
- Boys & Girls Clubs of America
- BlueLinx Holdings
- Carter's
- Chick-fil-A (unincorporated Fulton County)
- Comcast
- Church's Chicken
- CNN
- Circa of America
- The Coca-Cola Company
- Coca-Cola Enterprises
- Colonial Pipeline (Alpharetta)
- Cox Automotive
- Cox Communications (Dunwoody)
- Cox Enterprises (Sandy Springs)
- Cox Media Group (Sandy Springs)
- Crawford & Company
- Dell SecureWorks
- Delta Air Lines
- Dunkin' Donuts (Part of Inspire Brands)
- Double Up Digital
- EarthLink
- Elavon
- Equifax
- Exide
- Floor & Decor
- First Data (Sandy Springs)
- Focus Brands
- Foundation Financial Group
- Galaxy Gas
- Gas South
- GCP Technologies
- Gentiva Health Services
- Genuine Parts
- Georgia-Pacific
- Global Franchise Group
- Global Payments
- Glock, Inc
- Gray Television
- Great Wraps
- GreyOrange AI (Roswell)
- Hapag Lloyd
- Havertys
- Honeywell (software center)
- HD Supply
- The Home Depot (unincorporated Cobb County)
- Hooters of America, Inc
- Insight Global
- Intercontinental Exchange (ICE)
- InterContinental Hotels Group (Americas Headquarters)
- Internap
- Invesco
- Jamba Juice
- Kabbage
- King & Spalding
- Krystal
- Lockheed Martin Aeronautics (in Marietta, a manufacturing plant)
- MaggieMoo's Ice Cream and Treatery
- MailChimp
- Marble Slab Creamery
- Mellow Mushroom
- Mercedes-Benz (USA)
- Merial
- Mirant
- NAPA Auto Parts
- NCR
- Newell Rubbermaid
- New Vision Television
- Norfolk Southern
- North American Electric Reliability Corporation
- Novelis
- Oxford Industries
- Papa John's
- ParkMobile
- Piedmont Healthcare
- Popeyes (moved out in 2018)
- Porsche AG (American headquarters)
- PulteGroup
- RaceTrac
- Remington Arms
- Rheem Manufacturing Company
- Roark Capital Group
- Rollins/Orkin
- SANY America (in Peachtree City)
- Scientific-Atlanta (in Lawrenceville)
- Service Master
- Sharecare
- Simmons Bedding Company (in Norcross)
- Sony Mobile (North American headquarters)
- Southern Company
- Spanx
- Travelport
- Troutman Sanders
- Turner Broadcasting
- UPS (in Sandy Springs)
- Uncle Maddio's Pizza Joint
- Vision Airlines (in Suwanee)
- Visa
- Veritiv
- Waffle House (unincorporated Gwinnett County)
- The Weather Channel (in Vinings)
- TK Elevator
- WestRock
- Wing Zone
- Yik Yak
- YP Holdings (in Tucker)

=== Housing market ===
According to the Case–Shiller index, home prices in Atlanta increased 19.1% between March 2012 and March 2013.
