= List of television shows set in Atlanta =

Television shows set in Atlanta

Many television shows are filmed in Atlanta, set in Atlanta, or both:

== Shot and/or set in metro Atlanta (partial list) ==
- The Amazing World Of Gumball, produced by Cartoon Network studios in Europe and Atlanta.
- All American: Homecoming
- A Man in Full
- Atlanta
- Archer
- Big Rich Atlanta on Style Network
- Black Lightning, produced by The CW and aired on January 16, 2018
- Class of 3000 on Cartoon Network
- Chrisley Knows Best
- Containment, produced by The CW and aired from April 19 through July 19, 2016
- Devious Maids (set in Beverly Hills but filmed primarily at EUE Screen Gems in Atlanta)
- Don't Be Tardy
- Drop Dead Diva (set in Los Angeles but actually filmed around Peachtree City and Senoia)
- Dynasty, 2017 continuation on CW of the 1980s series, with the story moved, and shot, in Atlanta.
- Family Feud 2011-2012 season was recorded at the Atlanta Civic Center (host Steve Harvey is a local resident)
- For Better or Worse, produced by Tyler Perry Studios
- Franklin & Bash, a Williams Street production
- Freaknik: The Musical, a Williams Street production
- Good Eats, hosted by local resident Alton Brown
- Halt and Catch Fire, set in the Dallas-Fort Worth Metroplex but actually filmed in Atlanta
- K. Michelle: My Life
- Kenan
- Let's Stay Together
- Love & Hip Hop: Atlanta
- Love, Simon
- Love, Victor
- Married to Medicine, documents the wives of doctors in Atlanta
- Mean Girls 2 was filmed in Atlanta in July 2010
- Meet the Browns, produced by Tyler Perry Studios
- Necessary Roughness (Set in Long Island but filmed in Atlanta, with football scenes filmed in the Georgia Dome)
- Ocean Mysteries with Jeff Corwin - Saturday morning nature show with Jeff Corwin airing on ABC
- One Punk Under God (documentary)
- Ozark, Netflix series, Lake Allatoona and Lake Lanier
- Property Virgins on HGTV, with host Egypt Sherrod of V-103 (earlier seasons were from HGTV Canada)
- Queer Eye on Netflix (Seasons 1 and 2)
- Raising Dion on Netflix
- Red Band Society on FOX
- The Resident
- Say Yes to the Dress: Atlanta, in Sandy Springs
- Say Yes to the Dress: Bridesmaids
- Second Generation Wayans, on BET
- Scream: Resurrection, third season of TV series based on the film series of the same name, also set in College Park, Georgia
- Stranger Things, set in Indiana but shot in Atlanta, Georgia
- T.I. & Tiny: The Family Hustle
- Teen Wolf on MTV
- Teenage Bounty Hunters
- The Game, shot in Atlanta since moving to BET for the 2011 season - as of January 2012 the highest-rated ad-supported sitcom ever on cable
- The Mo'Nique Show is filmed in Atlanta
- The New Atlanta - an upcoming Bravo reality series set in Atlanta
- The Real Housewives of Atlanta (series)
- The Rickey Smiley Show on TV One
- The Walking Dead, an AMC TV show recorded in and around Atlanta
- Tyler Perry's House of Payne is filmed in Atlanta, and involves fictional firefighters working for the Atlanta Fire Department, produced by Tyler Perry Studios
- Will Trent, TV series involving fictional special agents of the Georgia Bureau of Investigation and detectives of the Atlanta Police Department

== Individual episodes ==
- Baggage Battles "Atlanta" episode, regarding trucking freight rather than the baggage of the world's busiest airport
- Futurama episode "The Deep South" centers on the lost city of Atlanta, with several local references
- Scooby-Doo and Guess Who? episode "Quit Clowning!" has the Scooby gang meet Kenan Thompson and confront a ghost clown.
- In addition, numerous episodes of HGTV shows are filmed in metro Atlanta.

== Set but not shot in Atlanta ==
Several other TV series have been set (but not necessarily shot) in Atlanta:

- Cavemen was originally to be set in Atlanta but was changed to San Diego prior to production
- Designing Women
- Matlock (1986-1995/1997)
- Mindhunter - A couple scenes takes place in and around Atlanta
- Profiler
- Silo - Though the setting is never explicitly named, a post-apocalyptic ruined skyline resembles downtown Atlanta, and characters discover a relic Georgia travel guide.
- The Royal Family
