= Buy Herself =

- Genre: Real estate Reality television
- Starring: Sandra Rinomato
- Country of origin: Canada
- Original language: English

Production
- Running time: 30 minutes
- Production company: Si Entertainment

Original release
- Network: HGTV Canada
- Release: April 16 – July 2, 2012

Buy Herself is a Canadian reality television series, which premiered April 16, 2012 on HGTV Canada. Hosted by Sandra Rinomato, formerly of the HGTV series Property Virgins, the series focused on single women who are seeking to buy their first house on their own. Its format is otherwise similar to that of Property Virgins, with Rinomato showing the potential buyer three homes and discussing how to manage and balance needs and expectations and complications in the home-buying process.

Rinomato has stated in interviews that she was interested in doing a show focusing specifically on female homebuyers because as a relatively new social phenomenon, they face a unique set of personal and social pressures – such as family and cultural expectations that women are supposed to prioritize marriage over investment as a route to financial security – that can make the process more difficult and challenging for them than it is for a single man or a family.

Although the show is still featured on HGTV's website, only a single season was produced for airing.

== Episodes ==
No.	Title	Original release date
1	"Kelly"	April 16, 2012
37-year-old Kelly has a great career and a single lifestyle in the city. She wants to be surrounded by like-minded professionals but is feeling socially stifled in a rental building filled with elderly people. Sandra takes on the job of taming Kelly's indecision and helping her find an urban condo to call her own.
2	"Danielle"	April 23, 2012
Aspiring real estate mogul Danielle can't achieve her dreams while living at her dad and stepmom's house. She is ready to buy a house on her own but is torn between her ambitions and lessons learned from her late mother. Sandra helps Danielle focus on her own needs and decide whether she is ready to be a landlord with her first purchase.
3	"Alicia"	April 30, 2012
Single mom Alicia and her baby daughter are quickly outgrowing their rental apartment. She's only got a few months before her maternity leave ends and she needs to settle into a new home before going back to work. Facing a tight budget, Sandra must find a condo for Alicia that satisfies her needs as a mother, and her needs as a vibrant city-dweller who doesn't want to be isolated in the suburbs.
4	"Sandy"	May 7, 2012
After 15 years of living a posh life, recently-divorced Sandy is now renting an apartment without enough space for her two kids. She has high expectations for a home that suits her family needs, but also her newly single lifestyle. Sandra helps Sandy accept her new reality, and shows her that a downsize doesn't have to be a downgrade.
5	"Jessica"	May 14, 2012
Jessica is a young music-lover who likes to stay out all night. Her lease expires in two months and instead of starting a new rental search, she's ready to buy a home that's close to the downtown rock scene. Sandra keeps safety and security top of mind as she shows Jessica three condos that suit her energetic lifestyle.
6	"Bali"	May 21, 2012
35-year-old Bali is the eldest of three siblings, and the last still living at home with her parents. She is very connected with her family, and is about to buck the traditional Punjabi trend by moving out on her own before marriage. Sandra helps Bali decide whether she wants to live in a suburban home close to family, or a downtown condo by herself.
7	"Ana"	May 28, 2012
26-year-old Ana works with at-risk women, and is determined to buy her own home because it represents security and independence. She is fiercely driven, and hopes to be the first woman in her Angolan family to own a home. Sandra is put to the test by Ana's big expectations and small budget.
8	"Stephanie"	June 4, 2012
28-year-old teacher Stephanie has been couch-surfing with family for years, and feels she is treated like a child. She has worn out her welcome at her sister's house, and is ready to prove to the world that she's an adult by buying her own home. Sandra takes Stephanie townhouse-hunting, and helps her see that independence is attainable.
9	"Michelle"	June 11, 2012
Michelle was devastated when her marriage ended, and she just sold her marital home in an attempt to close a painful chapter in her life. She needs a home for her new independent lifestyle, but can't decide between a house or a condo. Sandra guides Michelle through the options, and helps her re-start her life with confidence.
10	"Sarah"	June 18, 2012
32-year-old Sarah has recently settled down after 10 years of traveling and working abroad. She wants to be part of a community but doesn't know the city, and still feels the pangs of wanderlust. Sandra shows Sarah three sleek condos to entice this nomad to set down roots.
11	"Silvia"	June 25, 2012
28-year-old Silvia has spent her professional life working with at-risk youth, but the group home where she lives is shutting down. Silvia wants to buy a move-in ready house with income potential. Sandra helps Silvia separate her wants from her needs, and helps her understand the implications of being a landlord.
12	"Wafaa"	July 2, 2012
Wafaa found herself penniless after a failed marriage in her mid-20s, and resolved to never be financially dependent on someone else. Buying her own home is the final piece of the puzzle, and she has high demands for a sexy downtown loft. Sandra teaches Wafaa that she will have to compromise if she wants to achieve her dream.
13	"Yinnie"	July 2, 2012
After years of caring for her ailing grandmother, Yinnie finds herself still living at home at 34. She loves her family dearly but they are smothering her and cramping her transition to adulthood. Sandra takes Yinnie out of the suburban family nest and shows her three youthful downtown condos.
14	"Tiffany"	July 2, 2012
Tiffany was raised by a single mom who taught her to be fiercely independent and self-sufficient. She has been saving for a decade, and is ready to start building a real estate empire just like her mom. She wants the world in her first home, so Sandra takes on the challenge of tempering Tiffany's overconfidence.
