= Sandra Rinomato =

Canadian real estate expert and television personality

- Born: Canada
- Occupations: Real estate broker, television host
- Website: http://www.sandrarinomato.com

Sandra Rinomato is a Canadian real estate expert and television personality who lives in Toronto, Ontario, Canada best known for hosting Property Virgins and Buy Herself.

== Property Virgins ==
Property Virgins is a reality television series produced by Cineflix. The program originated on HGTV Canada in March 2006 and expanded to HGTV in the United States in its second season. Rinomato hosted the show from its inception until 2011. The show portrays the experiences of prospective first-time home buyers, or "property virgins". The host of the show coaches first time home buyers to adjust their dream home vision to a more realistic one that fits the market and their budget.

== Personal life ==
Rinomato resides in Toronto with her husband, Gary MacRae, son and her dog. She owns a real estate brokerage Royal LePage Terrequity Rinomato. Sandra is still an active real estate agent in the GTA.
