= A. D. Frazier =

American politician (1944–2024)

A. D. Frazier, Jr.
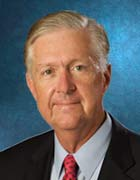

Member of the Board of Directors of the Tennessee Valley Authority
- In office January 9, 2018 – May 18, 2022
- President: Donald Trump
- Preceded by: Vera Lynn Evans

Personal details
- Born: Adolphus Drewry Frazier Jr. June 23, 1944 Rocky Mount, North Carolina, U.S.
- Died: September 23, 2024 (aged 80) Mineral Bluff, Georgia, U.S.
- Party: Democratic
- Education: University of North Carolina at Chapel Hill (BA, JD)

Adolphus Drewry Frazier Jr. (June 23, 1944 – September 23, 2024) was an American business executive and one of the organizers of the 1996 Summer Olympics. Frazier held executive positions with Invesco, Caremark Rx, Gold Kist, and Danka Business Systems.

== Life and career ==
Frazier was born in Rocky Mount, North Carolina, on June 23, 1944. His parents were Adolphus Drewry Frazier Sr., a Baptist preacher, and Pauline (Smith) Frazier, a teacher.

He earned an undergraduate degree in 1965 and a law degree in 1968, both from the University of North Carolina.

In 1969, he joined Citizens & Southern National Bank in Atlanta as a management trainee. He became head of the public relations department in 1973. There, he built a relationship with Mayor of Atlanta Maynard Jackson.

He managed the 1977 inauguration of President Jimmy Carter and headed the team reorganizing the White House and Executive Office of the President, also under President Carter.

Starting in 1982, Frazier became first chairman of Georgia Public Broadcasting and helped merge two public television stations into one state agency.

In early 1991, he was running a $10 billion portfolio of loans for First National Bank of Chicago. He took a 50% pay cut, to a $300,000 salary to join the Atlanta Committee for the Olympic Games.

Frazier was the chief operating officer for the Atlanta Committee for the 1996 Summer Olympics.

After the 1996 Summer Olympics, Frazier became President and CEO of Invesco.

In 2001 and 2002, Frazier was the Chairman and CEO of the Chicago Stock Exchange.

In January 2005, he joined Balch & Bingham.

Frazier was the owner and chairman of WolfCreek Broadcasting, a radio broadcasting company in North Georgia.

In 2009, he became a co-founder of BOTH USA, LLC, which provided back office services.

He served until his death on the board of directors of the Alliance Theatre in Atlanta.

He was nominated to the board of directors of the Tennessee Valley Authority by President Donald Trump and sworn into office on January 9, 2018.

Frazier died at his home in Mineral Bluff, Georgia, on September 23, 2024, at the age of 80.
