= Invesco =

Investment management company

Invesco Ltd.

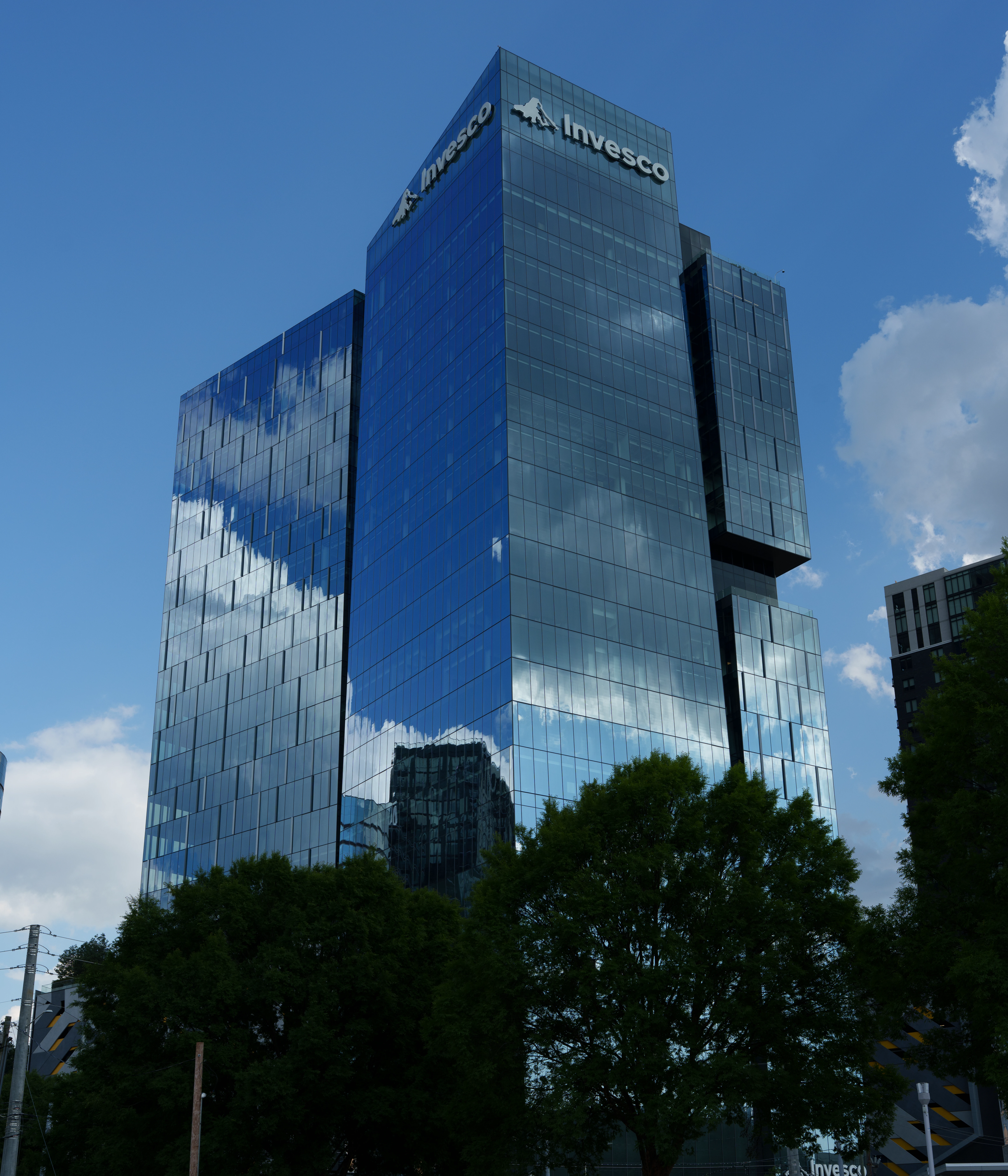
- Invesco global headquarters, 2026
- Type: Public
- Traded as: NYSE: IVZ; S&P 500 component
- ISIN: BMG491BT1088
- Industry: Investment management
- Founded: 1978; 48 years ago
- Founder: Charles W. Brady
- Headquarters: Atlanta, Georgia, U.S.
- Key people: Rick Wagoner (chairman); Andrew Schlossberg (CEO)
- Products: Asset management; Wealth management; Alternative investment
- Revenue: ▲US$6.377 billion (2025)
- Operating income: ▼ -US$695 million (2025)
- Net income: ▼ -US$726 million (2025)
- AUM: ▲US$2.170 trillion (2025)
- Total assets: ▲US$27.094 billion (2025)
- Total equity: ▼US$12.231 billion (2025)
- Number of employees: 7,499 (2025)
- Website: invesco.com

Invesco Ltd., organized in Bermuda, with principal executive offices in Atlanta, Georgia, is an investment management company. The company has clients in 120 countries.

As of December 31, 2025, the company had $2.2 trillion in assets under management including $407 billion in Invesco QQQ; $630 billion in other exchange-traded funds and index funds; $311 billion in actively-managed fixed income accounts; $298 billion in actively-managed equities accounts; $130 billion in private credit and real estate investments; $132 billion in Invesco Great Wall, a joint venture in China; $189 billion in Global Liquidity/money market funds, and $69 billion in other types of accounts. It had $1.5 trillion invested for retail clients and $0.7 trillion invested for institutional clients.

== History ==
The company traces its roots to H. Lotery & Co. Ltd., a UK-based advisory firm formed in 1935.

In 1978, Citizens & Southern National Bank sold its money management operations, then named INVESCO, to Charles Brady and eight partners for $230,000.

In November 1986, Britannia Arrow bought a 45% stake in INVESCO for £47 million. In November 1988, Britannia bought the rest of INVESCO for £75 million. Beginning in the late 1980s, efforts to apply INVESCO's more quantitative investment techniques to the UK equities market failed and the company's investments underperformed in the early 1990s recession, resulting in client losses.

In August 1995, the company became a public company via an initial public offering.

From 1996 to 2001, A. D. Frazier was CEO of the company.

In 1997, the company acquired AIM Management Group and changed its name to Amvescap.

In March 1999, the company launched the Invesco QQQ exchange-traded fund.

In 2000, the company acquired Perpetual, a British investment manager. The company had been founded in 1973 by Martyn Arbib, who was its biggest shareholder at the time of the purchase. The British unit took the name Invesco Perpetual. Neil Woodford, described as Perpetual's "star income manager", continued to be employed by Amvescap/Invesco until 2013.

In October 2004, the company agreed to a $450 million settlement with the State Attorney Generals of New York and Colorado, and the United States Securities and Exchange Commission after the company allegedly allowed over 40 individuals and entities to engage in market timing trading in mutual funds managed by Invesco in exchange for advisory fees.

In July 2006, the company agreed to acquire WL Ross & Co for $100 million upfront and potential earn-out payments to bring the purchase price to $375 million.

In September 2006, the company acquired Powershares Capital Management, the sponsor of 36 exchange-traded funds which added $6.3 billion of assets under management.

In May 2007, the company reverted to the Invesco name and moved its domicile to Bermuda. In November 2007, Invesco moved its principal office from London to Atlanta.

In March 2008, Invesco renamed its U.S. mutual-fund unit Invesco Aim.

In October 2009, Invesco bought Morgan Stanley's Retail Unit, including Van Kampen Investments, for $1.5 billion.

In April 2010, the Invesco Aim unit dropped Aim from its name.

In September 2017, Invesco agreed to buy the exchange-traded fund business of Guggenheim Partners for $1.2 billion in cash.

In March 2018, the company retired the Perpetual, PowerShares and Trimark brands.

In June 2018, Invesco acquired Intelliflo, a technology platform for financial advisors. In August 2025, it was sold to affiliates of The Carlyle Group for up to $200 million.

In May 2019, Invesco acquired OppenheimerFunds from Massachusetts Mutual Life Insurance Company for about $5.7 billion in stock. In the same month, the company announced a $70 million investment and the creation of 500 jobs, as it relocated its headquarters in Atlanta to Midtown Union.

In June 2026, the company sold its Canadian investment fund business to CI Financial.

== Finances ==
Year	Revenue (billions of $)	Net Income (billions of $)	AuM (billions of $)
2023	5.7	$−0.333	1,585
2022	6.0	0.683	1,409
2021	6.9	1.393	1,610
2020	6.1	0.524	1,349
2019	6.1	0.564	1,226
2018	5.3	0.882	888
2017	5.2	1.127	937
2016	4.7	0.854	812
2015	5.1	0.968	775
2014	5.1	0.988	792
2013	4.6	0.940	778
2012	4.2	0.677	687
2011	4.1	0.729	625
2010	3.5	0.465	616
2009	2.7	0.322	423
2008	3.3	0.481	357
2007	3.9	0.673	500
2006	3.2	0.482	462
2005	2.9	0.219	386
