= Arden's Garden =

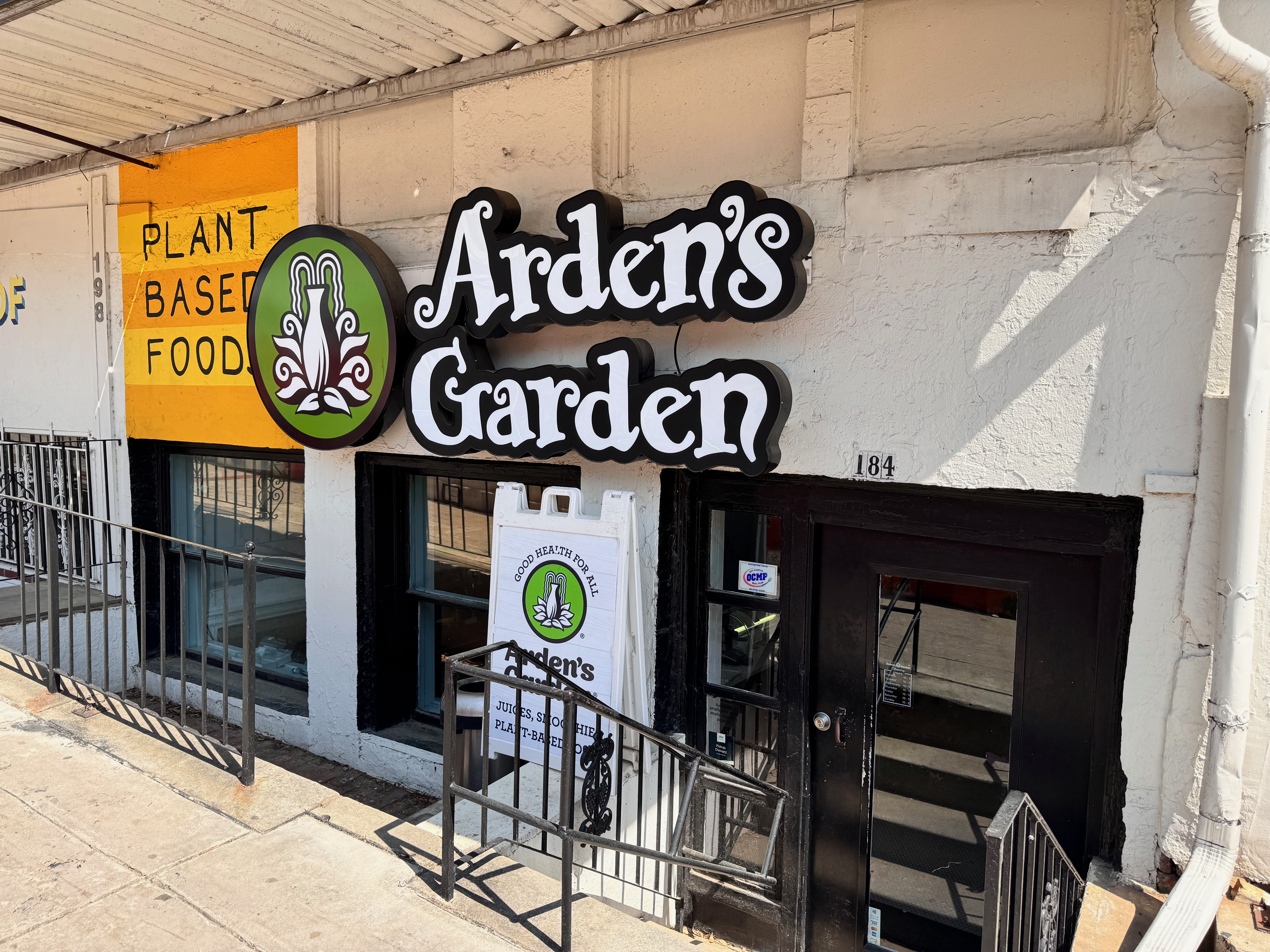
- Downtown Athens, Georgia, location
- Company type: Private
- Industry: Beverage
- Founded: 1995
- Founder: Arden Zinn
- Headquarters: Atlanta, Georgia, U.S.
- Area served: Regional
- Key people: Leslie Zinn (Owner)
- Website: Arden's Garden.com

Arden's Garden is an Atlanta-based family-owned juice company founded in 1995. It has 19 stores in greater Atlanta and sells bottled juices in 7 states: Georgia, Florida, Alabama, Virginia, Tennessee and both North and South Carolina. The company had nearly $3 million in sales in 2011 and about $5 million in 2021.

== Origins ==
Arden Zinn decided to start selling home-made juice in 1994, two years after having purchased an expensive Norwalk juicer and making juices for her family and friends. Before sales began to pick up in earnest, disappointment set in as it became clear that the short shelf-life of the home-made juices limited company prospects, a family friend suggested that Zinn peddle her products at local hair salons. The suggestion worked and Arden's Garden was born.

Zinn's daughter, Leslie Zinn, co-founded the company with her mother and is the current president and CEO.

Arden's Garden has over 19 storefronts in the Atlanta area and continues to open more.

== Commercial battle ==
In 2003, Arden's Garden's largest customer, the national chain Publix, removed the juice from its shelves in favor of Odwalla, a national brand owned by industry giant Coca-Cola. Leslie Zinn shot off an email to her close friends which snowballed into a 3,000-strong letter-writing campaign to demand that Publix reinstate Arden's Garden as its juice supplier. In response to the tremendous negative feedback, Publix dropped Odwalla and not only put Arden's Garden back on its shelves but expanded the line to another 200 stores.
