= Midtown Union =

Mixed-use development in Atlanta, Georgia

- Interactive map of Midtown Union
- Location: Atlanta, Georgia
- Address: 1331 Spring Street; Atlanta, Georgia, United States
- Coordinates: 33°47′29″N 84°23′20″W
- Groundbreaking: December 9, 2019
- Opening: September 21, 2022

Companies
- Architect: Cooper Carry; JLL
- Contractor: Brasfield & Gorrie
- Developer: Granite Properties
- Planner: Arquitectonica

Technical details
- Size: 8.5 acres (3.4 ha)
- Proposed: 2016

Midtown Union is a mixed-use development in Atlanta, Georgia, United States. First proposed in 2016 as Midtown Heights, the project would feature multiple high-rises built in midtown Atlanta at the intersection of 17th Street and Spring Street. Construction started in 2019 and was completed in September 2022.

== History ==
On August 8, 2016, MetLife announced that JLL had been selected as the master development manager for a new real estate development project in midtown Atlanta called Midtown Heights. MetLife had begun collecting the property, an 8.5-acre (3.4-hectare) parcel at the intersection of Spring Street and 17th Street, in 2006. Around this time, MetLife had planned for a high-rise mixed-use development at that site called "Metropolitan Center," but these ideas were shelved during the Great Recession. At the time of JLL's hiring, the parcel was home to an office building from the 1960s. On March 7, 2018, MetLife unveiled renderings for the project and announced that Arquitectonica had designed the project's master plan and Atlanta-based Cooper Carry would lead the building design. By May 2018, the project had taken the name Midtown Union.

On May 30, 2019, Invesco announced that they planned to be a major tenant in the new development. Per their announcement, they would occupy about half of the total office space in the development. On October 5 of that year, the office building at the site was demolished to make way for the development. Several weeks earlier, on September 10, the Midtown Development Review Committee had approved a revised plan for the project put forward by developer Granite Properties.

Construction officially began on November 26, 2019, with a groundbreaking ceremony occurring on December 9. Brasfield & Gorrie are serving as contractors for the project. The office and residential towers opened in July 2022, while the hotel commenced operations on September 21, 2022.

== Site and structures ==
The development will consist of a 26-story tower housing 600,000 square feet of office space, an 18-story residential building containing 355 apartments, and a 12-story hotel. Additionally, the development will feature 30,000 square feet of retail space.
