= Egypt Sherrod =

American television and radio personality and realtor

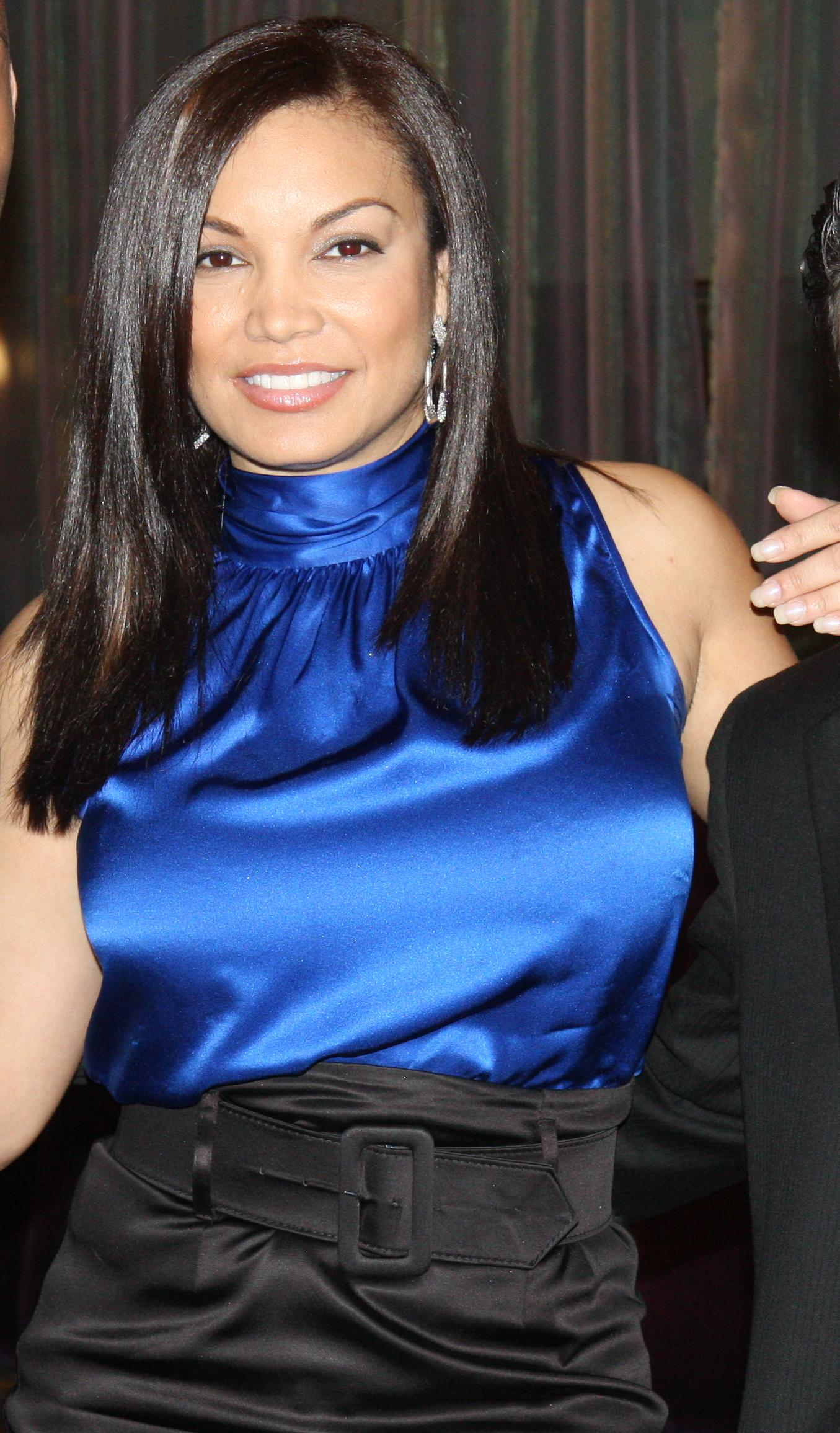
- 2008 Hip-Hop Summit Action Network's Action Awards
- Born: November 16, 1976 (age 49)
- Occupations: Television personality and real estate broker
- Children: 3

Egypt Sherrod is an American radio and television personality, as well as real estate broker and designer. She is best known as host of HGTV's Flipping Virgins and its long running show, Property Virgins. She is CEO & Managing Broker of the Atlanta-based residential brokerage Indigo Road Realty, and is also principal designer at Indigo Road Design Group and Indigo Road Home Furnishings.

== Early life and education ==
Egypt Alise Sherrod was born on November 16, 1976, in Philadelphia, Pennsylvania. She is the eldest of four siblings. Growing up in her grandparents' home, she slept in a closet that only fit her bed; as a child she dreamed to one day have a closet that was bigger than her bedroom.

She earned a Bachelor of Arts degree in broadcasting and telecommunications from Temple University. She also studied theater at New York University's Tisch School of the Arts. She holds the designation of Master Certified Negotiator, Accredited Buyer Representative, Certified Residential Specialist and Certified Distressed Property Expert.

== Career ==
Sherrod began hosting on a jazz station at 18. At 19, she got a job as a radio station music director—the youngest in the country. She was the number one radio personality for New York City’s WBLS 107.5, where she interviewed Prince, Tyler Perry, and Oprah. The program was syndicated in more than 60 cities throughout the US. She was also a correspondent on the Maury show.

I realized I had gone from being a girl to womanhood when I start taking responsibility for my actions and not being afraid to apologize, being okay with starting over being 100% comfortable in my own skin, learning the importance of humility, and being well rounded as a person, not one dimensional.

— 2011 interview with XONeCole

Growing tired of "gossip and entertainment reports," she thought about transitioning out of radio. Growing up with a father and uncle who were real estate brokers, she saw real estate as a way to earn retirement money and as a "fallback" to her career in radio, and her access to celebrities through her radio interview work elevated her real estate clientele. She bought her first home at 24-years-old. Much of her profits were going to fees for her real estate agents, so she became a licensed agent in 2002. Sherrod relates that, while hosting her radio show, she got a call from a casting director who was exploring Sherrod's interest in hosting a program that would become Property Virgins. She agreed to audition and secured the role. Four episodes into filming, however, she learned that she was pregnant and, fearing she may lose her job, hid it from the producers. To her delight, it was not an issue.

With a child on the way, Sherrod considered the challenge of maintaining a work/life balance in New York and, desiring something new, she considered moving. In March 2012, Sherrod accepted an offer to be the midday host of WVEE V-103 in Atlanta, a city she had frequented as a child when visiting relatives. While there, she conducted interviews with celebrities, including Keith Sweat, Musiq Soulchild, Jazze Pha, The Braxtons and Marsha Ambrosius. The show Property Virgins moved to Atlanta to accommodate her, and she began filming on the weekends. Overwhelmed with the demands of two jobs and her family life, as well as a bout of postpartum depression, Sherrod ultimately left her radio station job to focused on her television filming schedule.

Sherrod has made recurring appearances as the home buyers/sellers “go-to girl” on NBC's Today Show, CNBC, FOX, CNN, HLN, as well as being featured on Fast & Company, Yahoo, Homes.com, Rolling Stone, Black Enterprise, and a host of other publications and digital platforms. She wrote Keep Calm...It's Just Real Estate: Your No-Stress Guide To Buying A Home.

She starred in the 2012 film Life, Love, Soul. Sherrod has hosted HGTV’s "White House Christmas Special", the Rose Parade, and the HGTV "Urban Oasis" Giveaways. Prior to hosting for HGTV, Sherrod also hosted "Home Delivery" for Tribune's syndicated networks.

Sherrod has been sought out as a speaker and moderator. She hosted the stage at Oprah's "The Life You Want Tour." Sherrod has been invited as a recurring ‘Hot Topics’ guest and lifestyle pundit on programs such as Dish Nation, Steve Harvey, Showbiz Tonight, and Larry Wilmore Show. Sherrod will host the reunion special of the television soap opera series from the Oprah Winfrey Network, The Haves and the Have Nots, airing as part of the program's series finale package on July 27, 2021, and August 3, 2021.

In 2021, Sherrod and her husband Mike Jackson served as judges on Season 2 of HGTV's Rock the Block, then were competitors in Season 3 in 2022. Since December 2022, Sherrod and Jackson have starred in HGTV's Married to Real Estate, renovating fixer-uppers into a client's dream home.

== Accolades ==
Sherrod has received the Humanitarian Citation from the Borough of New York, State Assembly Citation as a Humanitarian and Community Advocate, as well as the New York City Council Citation for Community Service. She was nominated for an NAACP Image Award for her book "Keep Calm It's Just Real Estate", received the MISSION Award from WEEN (Women In Entertainment Empowerment Network), was named one of Network Journal's "40 Under 40," was #2 in Radio and Records’ "Power Player on the Rise" Top 10 list, and received the "Executive to Watch" Award from NABFEME (National Association of Black Female Executives in Music & Entertainment). Sherrod and her husband Mike Jackson were nominated for a 2022 Critics’ Choice Real TV Award for Best Lifestyle: Home/Garden Show for Married to Real Estate. The show was also nominated for a 2025 Daytime Emmy in the Outstanding Instructional/How-To category days after Sherrod announced the show's cancellation by HGTV.

== Charitable work ==
In 2008, Sherrod founded The Egypt Cares Family Foundation, a non-profit dedicated to financial empowerment and awareness. The “rising stars boot camp” is designed for children aged 8–17 who want to work in radio and television. The "Egypt Cares Give Back Tour" is an annual coat and toy drive, which has garnered proclamations from the Brooklyn President at the time, Marty Markowitz.

== Personal life ==
Sherrod first met her future husband Mike Jackson when they both worked in the entertainment industry, Sherrod as a radio personality and Jackson as a DJ. However, they did not become romantically involved until years later in 2004, when they reconnected working on a house renovation where Sherrod owned the investment property and Jackson worked as a contractor. Sherrod married Jackson on September 11, 2010.

Sherrod and Jackson have three daughters: Harper (b. February 2019); Kendall (b. January 2012); and Simone (b. 2002), Jackson's daughter from a previous relationship.

== Filmography ==
- Dish Nation – Guest host
- Home Delivery – Co-host
- Life, Love, Soul – Actor (Carrie Turner)
- Property Virgins (2012–present) – Host
- Flipping Virgins (2012–present) – Host
- All-Star Halloween Special (2015) – Host
- Good Morning America (2016)
- Brother Vs. Brother (2016–present) – Celebrity judge
- Home & Family (2016) – Guest host
- White House Christmas Special (2016) – Host
- Steve Harvey (2017)
- Urban Oasis (2017-2018) – Host
- Put a Ring On It (2020) - Reunion Host
- Rock the Block season 2 (2021) – Judge
- Rock the Block season 3 (2022) – Competitor
- Married to Real Estate (2022–present) - Host

== Podcasts ==
- Marriage and Money Podcast with Egypt & Mike (2022–present) – Host
- Little Black Dress with Rocsi Diaz and Nina Parker (2017) – Guest
- Redefining Wealth with Patrice Washington (2018) – Guest

== Bibliography ==
- Keep Calm...It's Just Real Estate: Your No-Stress Guide to Buying a Home
- Ignite Joy
