= Foundation Financial Group =

American financial services company

- Type: Private
- Industry: Financial services
- Founded: 1998 in Atlanta, Georgia, United States
- Defunct: 2014
- Fate: Unknown
- Area served: United States
- Key people: Mark Boyer (CEO)
- Services: Mortgage Loans, Retirement Services, Insurance Services
- Number of employees: 500+ (2013)
- Website: www.ffg.com

Foundation Financial Group was an American financial services company with regional operations centers in Atlanta, Fort Worth, Jacksonville, Raleigh, N.C., Rochester, New York and Savannah, Ga. as well as branch offices in Wichita, KS, St. Paul, MN, Indianapolis, IN, Greenwood, IN, Kansas City, MO, and Dayton, OH. It held mortgage lending licenses in 39+ states.

In addition, Foundation Financial Group was a major employer in Atlanta and Jacksonville, Florida.

== History ==
Foundation Financial Group began with the corporate inception of a regional center in Atlanta, Georgia in 2004. Later that year, it opened a second regional center in Jacksonville, Florida. In the following years, from 2005 to 2011, Foundation Financial Group expanded to obtain licensing in 39+ states, and retail branch locations.

Foundation Financial Group funds more than $4 billion in loans. A mortgage industry-tracking source, www.mortgageStats.com states that Foundation Financial Group grew by 14 percent in 2011, in contrast to the downward trend of other lenders in the same period. Additionally, the mortgage industry-tracking source, mortgagestats.com reports that the top 10 U.S. mortgage lender originations are down almost 21 percent for the same period, while Foundation Financial Group revenue has increased 34.55% since 2009.

In 2012, Foundation Financial Group entered a partnership with the Susan G. Komen for the Cure, a national nonprofit that funds breast cancer research. For each 2011 tax return Foundation Financial Group prepared, the company made a donation to Komen for the Cure.

The company was closed around 2014.

== Services ==
Foundation Financial Group offered residential mortgage lending and refinancing, property and casualty insurance for home or auto, as well as life insurance, and retirement services in the United States.

== See also ==
- Mortgage
- Financial services
- Refinancing
