= List of HGTV television shows set in Atlanta =

Numerous episodes of HGTV television shows are filmed in Atlanta, Georgia:

- Deserving Design, Atlanta Fire Department fire station #16, aired December 2008
- My First Place
  - "House Poor in Hotlanta" - March 2009-aired episode in Kennesaw (Mountain Oaks and Barrett Knoll)
  - "The Two-Bedroom Two-Step" (2008) on Belvedere near downtown Atlanta
  - "Confounded by Condos" - a woman looks for a condo in Brookhaven, Buckhead, or East Atlanta
- Curb Appeal shot an episode in or near East Atlanta
- Curb Appeal: The Block, which first aired January 2010, shot several episodes in the area, including its debut season in places like Decatur and Smyrna:
  - "Damaged Driveway Gets an Overhaul", aired on New Year's Day
  - "The Entire Block Comes Together to Make Over a House and the Street Itself", in the Winnona Park neighborhood of Decatur
- House Hunters:
  - "Post-Katrina Relocation" - a New Orleans real-estate agent who permanently evacuated from Hurricane Katrina finds a home
  - "Big Dreams, Small Budget"
  - "From the Big Apple to Atlanta" - the search for a home like his former one in New York
  - "Moving to Downtown Atlanta" - a woman in Duluth looks for a home in Midtown and Buckhead
  - "Downsizing in Atlanta"
  - "Georgia Bound" - a suburban home in Alpharetta
  - "Downtown Dwellers" (2008) a couple from a suburb near the Atlanta airport look in two new East Atlanta neighborhoods: Parkside Walk and Eastside Walk
  - a low-rise apartment near Piedmont Park
- Designed to Sell:
  - "Driving Home a Big Sale" (first aired June 2008)
  - "Green Makeover" (also June 2008)
  - "Trading Atlanta for Tennessee"
  - "An Art Gallery Owner Has Outgrown Her Atlanta Condo and Needs to Sell"
- My House Is Worth What?:
  - "Providence, Atlanta, Key Biscayne"
  - "Cranston, Atlanta, Minneapolis"
  - "Milwaukee, Bellevue, Atlanta"
  - "Barrington, Atlanta, New York"
  - "Denver, Atlanta, Key Biscayne"
