= Property Virgins =

- Genre: Real estate
- Starring: Sandra Rinomato (2006–2011); Egypt Sherrod (2012– ); Wendy Wolfe (2024–)
- Countries of origin: Canada; United States
- Original language: English

Production
- Running time: 30 minutes
- Production company: Cineflix

Original release
- Network: HGTV Canada, HGTV
- Release: 2006 – present

Property Virgins is a reality television series produced by Cineflix. The show portrays the experiences of prospective first-time home buyers, or "property virgins". The host of the show coaches first-time home buyers to adjust their dream home vision to a more realistic one that fits the market and their budget.

The program originated on HGTV Canada in March 2006 and expanded to HGTV in the United States in its second season. The program was hosted by Sandra Rinomato, a Toronto-based real estate expert, from its inception until 2011, and was then hosted by Egypt Sherrod, the founder of The Egypt Sherrod Real Estate Group. The series celebrated its 200th episode in March 2014, with Egypt Sherrod. A reboot of the series premiered on A&E's Home.Made.Nation in March 2024, with Wendy Wolfe as the host.

== Show information ==
Season one of Property Virgins focused exclusively on home buyers in the Greater Toronto Area. Subsequent seasons of the show have included both Toronto and major metropolitan areas in the United States, such as Dallas, Cincinnati, Miami, Washington, D.C., Richmond, Austin, New Jersey, Philadelphia, Boston, and San Diego.

Each episode runs 30 minutes, including commercials. At the beginning of each show, the host meets the prospective buyers in their desired neighborhood and asks them to guess the value of a house they like. The value of that house is usually above the customers' price range, prompting the host to reassure them that she will try to find a home in another neighborhood that meets the buyers' desired criteria. She usually asks the buyers to list some of the features they want in their new home, in order to give her a better idea of what to look for.

In a voice-over, the host briefly describes the neighborhood of the property she is about to show, then tells the viewer the square footage and asking price of the home. She meets her clients at the property for sale, then sends them in to tour the house. After they have toured the house, she answers their questions and asks them to guess the price. In most episodes, the clients are shown touring three different properties.

If the clients choose to purchase one of the properties, the host helps them decide on an offer and negotiate a contract. She also helps her clients understand other aspects of home buying and ownership, such as bidding wars, homeowners' association fees, down payments, closing costs, home inspections, and even renovations. The closing process, however, is not shown.

Not all potential buyers on the show purchase a home. A few of them decide to postpone home ownership, either because of relationship problems, financial issues, or other reasons.

== Episodes ==
There are some differences between the Canadian and U.S. airings for this show. Since it is a Canadian show, the following episode lists follow the Canadian season designations, episode numbers, titles and airdates. Alternate U.S. info is given where known.

=== Season 1 (2006-07) ===
- Note: This season was filmed around Toronto

No. overall	No. in season	Title	Original release date	U.S. air date
1	1	"Glen & Sarah"	October 4, 2006	
Newlyweds and property virgins Glen and Sarah live in a cramped apartment – so cramped that their wedding gifts are all currently in storage. Glen and Sarah's wish list for their first home is simple; a barbecue, a driveway, a large kitchen, two bedrooms and hardwood floors, all in a nice neighbourhood close to their jobs.
2	2	"Mat & Betty"	October 11, 2006	
Mat and Betty are property virgins. Married two and a half years, Betty, who is from Texas, has had a hard time adjusting to their 520 square foot basement apartment. The couple has also spent the last two years paying $1,000 per month toward Mat's personal debt. Living on a shoestring budget in a cramped space far away from familiar, spacious surroundings in Texas, Betty wants to buy a house and Mat is eager to make her happy.
3	3	"Yousuf Saddiqui" "A Deal on a Duplex"	October 18, 2006	October 21, 2007
Yousuf, tired of living with his parents in suburbia, hopes to gain some independence by purchasing his first home. But turning that dream into reality is not that simple. With only $280,000 to spend, Yousuf hopes to cover his mortgage payments by splitting a property into a duplex and then renting out one of the units.
4	4	"Damion & Irene"	October 25, 2006	
Damion and Irene have outgrown their apartment and their renter's lifestyle. Together for almost twelve years, they are ready to buy a house and have many ideas about what they want – except that none of their ideas match! He's modern, she's traditional and they can't agree on a location, price or style of property.
5	5	"Josh & Tracy" "No More Landlord!"	November 1, 2006	October 28, 2007
Josh & Tracy are first time home buyers. Tired of pouring rent money into someone else's pocket, they want a place of their own. But with a long list of requirements and no clue about the cost of real estate, Josh and Tracey are in for a shock.
6	6	"Cheryl Lou-Hing"	November 8, 2006	
Cheryl knows she wants her first home to be a condo, but unlike many urban youngsters, she's not interested in a new development. She wants something that coincides with her personality: quirky, eccentric, full of character, with enough space for her extensive shoe collection and in a university environment. What Cheryl doesn't realize is that her preferred neighborhood doesn't contain any condo buildings.
7	7	"Ryan & Katie"	November 15, 2006	
Katie and Ryan's whirlwind romance has gone from great to even better since they met two years ago and now they've decided to take things to the next level by buying their first home together.
8	8	"Andre & Kerry"	November 22, 2006	
Kerry and Andre, a young, hip couple who like expensive dinners, dancing in clubs, the latest fashion items and high-tech gadgets, still live with their parents and they're tired of it. But to get what they want, Kerry and Andre are going to have to change their ways.
9	9	"Jacquie & Blair"	December 13, 2006	
After six years of being in love Jacquie and Blair have decided that not only is now the right time to get married, it's also the time to buy their first house.
10	10	"Scott & Lauren"	December 20, 2006	
Lauren and Scott are newlyweds. Living in a luxurious condo owned by Lauren's parents ever since their wedding, the couple now want their independence with a home of their own.
11	11	"Lynnette & Rob"	December 27, 2006	
Lynnette and Rob want to start a family, but Lynnette won't even consider it until they own their own home.
12	12	"Steve & Sonja"	March 3, 2007	
Steve and Sonja are first-time homebuyers. They want a house with a big kitchen, a garage for Steve's beloved motorcycle, and two bathrooms. But what they want and what the debt-ridden couple can afford are two different things.
13	13	"Rob & Marsha" "Relocation, Relocation, Relocation"	March 3, 2007	December 16, 2007
Rob and Marsha have just relocated from the laid back lifestyle of the Cayman Islands to a bustling big city. With only six weeks left in corporate housing, Rob and Marsha are determined to find a condo that complements their carefree outlook.

=== Season 2 (2007) ===
- Note this season was filmed around Toronto, Dallas, and Cincinnati

No. overall	No. in season	Title	Original release date	U.S. air date
14	1	"Domestic Diva" "Domestic Diva"	July 4, 2007	January 13, 2008
Sharlyn, has taste fit for a queen and attitude to spare. She's determined to find a fully loaded, spacious condo in her modest price range and fulfill her dream of being the first person in her family to own a home.
15	2	"Eagle Has Landed" "Out of the Nest"	July 11, 2007	March 2, 2008
Animal-loving Cheyne is going into business with his parents and knows it's time to leave the nest. He's needs a place that's close to work but has lots of room for his wild brood which consists of cats, dogs, birds and a falcon named Bulls Eye.
16	3	"Needle in a Haystack" "Needle in a Haystack"	July 18, 2007	January 20, 2008
Erin and Karl want to move out of Erin's parents home and into a place they can call their own. Their plan is to live off the land but with no jobs or no idea how much acreage costs, their rural aspirations may end up going by the country wayside.
17	4	"Location, Location" "Safe Location"	July 25, 2007	February 10, 2008
Twenty-four-year-old Caroline is Miss Independence, a Texas gal with definite plans to fly the coop. She lives with her mother whose not thrilled about her chick's plans to leave the nest.
18	5	"Property Princess" "Dream Home Drama"	August 1, 2007	January 27, 2008
Actress and property “princess”, Karen, is ready for her next big role starring as a homeowner. Trouble is, she's coming down with a bad case of stage fright and may not be ready to make the big leap to owning a home.
19	6	"No Small Miracle" "The Art of Compromise"	August 8, 2007	February 24, 2008
Kelly is a savvy sports writer still living at home with her parents, at thirty something she feels it's time to move out. But does this stubborn woman know how to compromise? She's been looking for homes for over a year and still hasn't found the house of her dreams.
20	7	"First Time for Everything" "Their First Home"	August 15, 2007	January 6, 2008
Sarah and Kevan are very young and very much in love. This young couple is planning on walking down the aisle shortly and would like to start their new life in a home of their own.
21	8	"Dream On" "Dreaming of a Dream Home"	August 22, 2007	February 17, 2008
Plus-size model Kate's a big city dreamer living in the middle of nowhere. She needs to relocate to grow her business but finding the right home is all about feeling the vibe.
22	9	"Scott & Scott/A Tale of Two Scotts" "A Tale of Two Scotts"	August 29, 2007	March 23, 2008
Tired of paying rent and looking to get into the real estate market, Scott and Scott find a home that fits them to a T, but their plans hit a serious snag when they get caught up in an unexpected bidding war.
23	10	"Seeing Is Believing" "Love at First Sight"	September 5, 2007	April 6, 2008
Rebecca and Derek are big personalities living in a cramped space. This great creative duo is busting at the seams and needs new digs, the problem is both are afraid of getting in over their heads. They don't want a mortgage that will stretch them to the limit.
24	11	"What a Woman Wants" "What a Girl Wants"	September 12, 2007	February 3, 2008
Dallas radio host Lynne is stuck in a groove and wants to buy a house. Will Lynne hear the music and make the biggest purchase of her life? Or will Lynne's fear of the financial responsibility of a mortgage hold her back? She has her financial comfort zone and wants to stick to it.
25	12	"The Three Amigos" "The Three Amigos"	September 19, 2007	March 30, 2008
Best buddies since high school, Norm, Derek and Jerome have decided to pool their resources to buy their very own bachelor pad. Besides wanting to move out of their parents' homes, these guys are betting to win big on the real estate market.
26	13	"Cold Feet" "Nervous Newlyweds"	September 26, 2007	March 9, 2008
Eric and Huyen have outgrown their cramped rental apartment and are ready to explore the real estate market. The newlyweds are already thinking about having kids, and they will need more room before they begin growing their family.
27	14	"Foot in the Door" "A Foot in the Door"	October 1, 2007	August 17, 2008
Virginie and Jeff are newlyweds with a baby. Tired of living with Virginie's parents, the couple is looking for a nest of their own. But Virginie and Jeff are committed to staying within their budget and don't want to be stretched too thin financially.
28	15	"To Buy, Or Not to Buy..." "No Laughing Matter"	October 8, 2007	June 15, 2008
Twenty-nine-year-old Tabari, a stand up comedian from Cincinnati, is still living at his parents' house but is ready to get a place of his own. An avid collector of sports memorabilia, he needs space to display and store his impressive collection. But finding a place to call his own won't be anything to laugh about!
29	16	"Decisions, Decisions" "Decisions, Decisions/Taking the Plunge"	October 15, 2007	July 20, 2008
Jason, a hard working Cincinnati plumber, is ready to take his first ever plunge into the real estate market.
30	17	"Nouveaux Beginnings"	October 22, 2007	
After only eight months of living in Toronto, Parisians Dominique and Jeremy are ready to move out of their rental apartment and into a home of their own, despite knowing little about the city, and even less about the real estate market. After finding the home they want, they get caught up in a bidding war.
31	18	"Over the Threshold" "Over the Threshold"	October 29, 2007	June 8, 2008
Stacy and Mark are engaged but both still live at home with their respective parents. After tying the knot, Stacy hopes Mark will carry her over the threshold of their very own house, but planning a wedding and buying a house is a lot for one couple to take on.
32	19	"He Said, She Said" "He Said, She Said"	November 5, 2007	July 27, 2008
Urban dwellers Ari and Rosalie are ready to buy their own home, but their thinking is miles apart. He favors an industrial conversion loft, and she dreams of a two-bedroom house with a garden.
33	20	"Legal-Ease" "Big Budget"	November 12, 2007	July 6, 2008
Allison and Ken have a whopping $800,000 to spend on their first home. They've also got big expectations to match and insist that for the price they're willing to pay, they ought to find a perfect home in a perfect neighborhood - without any compromises!
34	21	"Womb Mates" "Twin Trouble"	November 19, 2007	June 29, 2008
Fraternal twins Matt and Mike are ready to invest in a house together, but have different views of what they're looking for in a home.
35	22	"Great Expectations" "Great Expectations"	November 26, 2007	June 22, 2008
A design-show addict with a serious penchant for decorating, Tim is desperate to escape his parents' home in the suburbs and move into an urban oasis of his own. He's got a healthy nest egg and plenty of motivation, but will his perfectionism and high expectations get in the way?
36	23	"Arrested Development" "The Cop Shops"	December 3, 2007	August 24, 2008
Autumn is a 32-year-old cellar dweller who is ready to step into the light. For now, the outgoing police officer lives in her parents' basement, but she hopes that a little real estate luck combined with a healthy down payment will land her the starter home of her dreams.
37	24	"Basement Blues" "Bye, Bye Basement"	December 8, 2007	July 13, 2008
Newlyweds Jeff and Michelle are serious sports fans and in order to get out of her parents' basement, they're going to have to work as a team. They've scouted out their favorite older neighborhoods, but will they be prepared to scale down their expectations to fit their budget?
38	25	"Moving On Up" "Moving On Up"	December 8, 2007	August 10, 2008
Eric wants to give up his bachelor pad and buy a home closer to his family. But when he finds a house he wants, will the seller accept his lowball offer?
39	26	"Tears for Fears" "Renters Ready to Move"	December 8, 2007	June 29, 2008
Dan and Christina have their hearts set on a townhouse, but are quickly disappointed when they find out the price is above their budget. However, Sandra may be able to make their dreams come true after all.

=== Season 3 (2008) ===
- Note: This season was filmed around Miami, Toronto, Washington, D.C., and Richmond

No. overall	No. in season	Title	Original release date	U.S. air date
40	1	"Jenny" "Jenny Saves a Penny"	July 2, 2008	January 19, 2009
Jenny, a twenty-year-old, over-achieving Miami investment specialist, is determined to buy her first home. Is she willing to adjust her expectations to fit the market?
41	2	"Cara & Alvaro" "Common Ground"	July 7, 2008	January 4, 2009
Cara and Alvaro want the perfect house at the perfect price, but they don't seem to agree on anything.
42	3	"Stan & Merrily" "Searching for a Miami Dream Home"	July 14, 2008	March 2, 2009
After living overseas for years, forty-somethings Stan and Merrily are finally ready to plunge into home ownership.
43	4	"Marcie & Frankie" "Lucky in Love"	July 21, 2008	February 9, 2009
Marcie and Frankie are ready for their next big commitment. They want to move out of their downtown, one-bedroom rental and into their very own Miami dream home
44	5	"Jen & Jason" "Bidding Wars in an Aggressive Toronto Market"	July 28, 2008	March 16, 2009
California natives Jen and Jason met online, fell in love, and moved to Toronto, and now they're ready for a home of their own.
45	6	"Erin & Jeff" "The Choice Is Theirs"	August 6, 2008	February 16, 2009
Erin and Jeff are ready to find a home of their own, but will they be ready to shrink their dreams to fit their budget?
46	7	"Rick & Patricia" "Leaving Apartment Life and Searching for the Perfect Home"	August 11, 2008	March 9, 2009
High school sweethearts Patricia and Rick are ready to take their next big step. They want to ditch their rental apartment for the perfect home in the perfect location, but can they do it on a less than perfect budget?
47	8	"Finicky Fiancés" "Finicky Fiancés"	August 18, 2008	January 5, 2009
High school sweethearts Kristen and Michael have outgrown their rented one-bedroom apartment and are ready for their next big step: they'd like to settle into their very first home before their upcoming wedding. But will they be willing to compromise if their ideal neighborhood is financially out of reach?
48	9	"Emily & Chris" "A Couple Goes House-Hunting Just Two Weeks Before Their Wedding"	August 25, 2008	February 2, 2009
Emily and Chris are getting married in just two weeks, and they're hoping to buy their first home before they say ‘I do.' Since they have a long wish list and don't necessarily agree on what they want, however, finding that special property could be more of a challenge than they're expecting.
49	10	"Lucky Strike" "A Woman Who Survived a Lightning Strike is Shocked by Real Estate Prices"	September 1, 2008	February 23, 2009
Jen has a new lease on life since being struck by lightning. She says she's grabbing life by the horns and is ready to settle down in her very own home. But is she truly ready for the reality of Washington D.C.'s pricey real estate market?
50	11	"Big Wedding, Bigger House" "Big Wedding, Big House"	September 8, 2008	January 12, 2009
Anjie and Alpesh are busy planning their lavish, week-long Hindu wedding. And although they've got just four months to go, they also want to buy their first home in time for the honeymoon. They say they're serious, but are they prepared to follow through?
51	12	"Janice & Keefe" "Photo Finish"	September 15, 2008	January 12, 2009
Janice and Keefe are crazy about motor sports and each other. And with their wedding in just a few months, they're hoping to move out of their parents' homes, and into a place of their own.
52	13	"Amy & Dave" "Hard Work Pays Off"	September 22, 2008	June 29, 2009
Amy and Dave fell in love at university, and after years of saving and hard work, they're ready to buy their first home. As property virgins go, they've got a huge budget, but will it be enough to secure their dream home in Toronto's red-hot real estate market?
53	14	"Close to Home" "A Woman Takes the Plunge and Moves Out of Her Family's Home"	September 29, 2008	May 4, 2009
Rubina, a strong and independent woman, wants to move out of her family's home and into a home of her own. With a long wish list and $200,000 in cash she wants a detached home complete with a dressing room and income potential. But after looking at a few homes, she isn't sure whether she's willing to renovate or be a landlord, after all.
54	15	"Leaving the Nest" "Leaving the Nest"	October 6, 2008	June 8, 2009
James is a happy-go-lucky, young professional who's growing tired of his daily, three-hour commute. He says he's ready to move out of his parents' suburban home and into a downtown bachelor pad of his own. But with his limited budget, he may have to considerably downsize his expectations.
55	16	"Nav & Kush" "Seasons Change"	October 13, 2008	January 26, 2009
Tired of living in his mother's basement, Nav and Kush are ready to move their growing family into a home of their own. With the couple's long wish list, and with Nav calling all the shots, can Sandra find a place that satisfies both of them?
56	17	"Josh" "A Toronto Man Considers Whether to Spend a Large Inheritance on a New Home"	October 20, 2008	April 6, 2009
Josh wants to buy his first property. He's got a $400,000 down payment to secure a comfortable Toronto home with plenty of charm and good resale value, but is cautious about spending his inheritance.
57	18	"Lindsay & David" "A Seller's Second Thoughts"	October 27, 2008	June 15, 2009
Ready to start a family, Toronto newlyweds Lindsay and David want to buy their first home. They'd like to find a property that's close to transit with a basement apartment and lots of green space. The first home they visit is an instant hit, and they decide to make an offer. After being rebuked by the home's irrational seller, however, their search continues.
58	19	"Kathy & Ryan" "A Family with a Second Child on the Way Is Ready to Find a Home of Their Own"	October 27, 2008	April 20, 2009
Kathy and Ryan are living in her mother's basement with a toddler and five birds. After five years of saving, and another baby on the way, they're ready to move above ground and into a Toronto-area home of their own.
59	20	"Ryan & Eve" "Looking for a First Home in an Upscale Neighborhood"	November 3, 2008	June 22, 2009
With their first baby on the way, Toronto newlyweds Ryan and Eve are quickly outgrowing their one-bedroom condo. They'd like to move to the upscale lakeside neighborhood they grew up in, but are they ready to compromise?
60	21	"Nicole" "Great Expectations for a First Home in Richmond"	November 17, 2008	June 1, 2009
Richmond, Virginia's Nicole is fresh from New York City and she wants to buy her first home. Can this property virgin satisfy her urban tastes or is this city girl in for a reality check?
61	22	"Dan & Leigh" "Richmond Newlyweds Prepare for Life in the Country"	November 24, 2008	April 13, 2009
Newlyweds Dan and Leigh are ready to give up their city rental apartment for a home of their own in the country. They'd like to find a property with lots of space for a family, a big yard, and plenty of privacy.
62	23	"Robert & Dawn" "A House-Hunting Couple Can't Agree on Neighborhoods"	December 1, 2008	May 11, 2009
Richmond, Virginia's Robert and Dawn are ready to invest in their first home. Both want a property with charm, convenience and good resale value, but they can't seem to agree on the neighborhood.
63	24	"Brenda" "Never Too Late"	December 8, 2008	April 27, 2009
Fabulous at fifty, Brenda is ready to buy her first home. She's been dreaming about it for years, but had to pay off big debts before she could make it happen. She'd like to find a perfect Richmond, Virginia starter home where she can entertain in style.
64	25	"Andy & Jannette" "His and Hers"	December 15, 2008	July 15, 2009
Andy, a self-proclaimed computer geek with a handsome nest egg, is ready to buy his first home in Richmond, Virginia. And although he'll be alone on the mortgage papers, he'll be sharing the property with his girlfriend, Jannette.
65	26	"Lindsay, Jason, and Wes" "A Couple Teams Up With a Friend to Buy a New Home for the Three of Them"	December 22, 2008	May 18, 2009
With their growing family, Lindsay and Jason have outgrown their one-bedroom rental. But since they can't afford to buy a home on their own, they're partnering with their long-time bachelor friend, Wes. They all get along famously, but their lifestyles are different, and that can make buying a home together very stressful.

=== Season 4 (2009-10) ===
- Note: This season was filmed around Toronto, Austin, New Jersey, Philadelphia, and Boston

From this season onward, episodes were first broadcast in the US.

No. overall	No. in season	Title	Original release date	Canadian air date
66	1	"Crystal & J.P." "Reality Check"	September 30, 2009	July 13, 2009
Tired of their one-hour commute and desperate for privacy and more space, J.P. and Crystal want to move out of his parents' place and into a home of their own.
67	2	"Natalie & Kareem" "High Hopes, Modest Means"	October 7, 2009	July 6, 2009
Globetrotting Toronto property virgins, Natalie and Kareem, are ready to buy a home for their future family. But can any listing possibly satisfy both their budget and five-star expectations?
68	3	"Julie & Phil" "Crib for the Canine Companion"	October 12, 2009	July 27, 2009
For Julie and Phil, Toronto didn't feel like home until they got their dog, Edie. And now they want to put down roots and give their canine companion a luxurious home in a prime neighborhood.
69	4	"Jason" "On the House"	October 21, 2009	August 31, 2009
With a hefty down payment and high expectations, small-town bartender Jason wants to move out of his parents' home and into the big-city condo of his dreams.
70	5	"Amy & Shelly" "Courage to Commit"	October 28, 2009	August 17, 2009
Best friends Amy and Shelley are making the leap from housemates to homeowners, and are pooling their resources to make it happen. Will their limited budget end the dream before they get started? And can they summon the courage to sign on the dotted line?
71	6	"Heather & Steve" "Best Laid Plans"	November 4, 2009	August 3, 2009
With high hopes and a healthy down payment, college sweethearts Heather and Steve want to buy a detached suburban home where they can start a family – and where his rock band can rehearse in peace.
72	7	"Courtney & Ed" "Finding the Perfect Ten"	November 11, 2009	August 10, 2009
Austin, Texas newlyweds, Ed and Courtney, want to buy a home where they can settle down with their new dog and start a family. They have a long checklist – and their very own home-ranking system. But can any listing possibly score a perfect ten?
73	8	"Justin & Kar" "After the Honeymoon, Reality"	December 5, 2009	October 7, 2009
Justin and Karina want to find a move-in ready, suburban Toronto dream home before they tie the knot. Sandra promises to find a property that fits their budget and need for size. But after viewing 50 listings, can she get the overwhelmed couple to focus?
74	9	"Alison & Jeff" "High or Low"	December 9, 2009	October 14, 2009
Tired of paying a premium for their cramped, 400-square-foot rental, recent business school grads Alison and Jeff are ready to invest in their very first condo in Toronto's popular West End.
75	10	"Maggie" "Jersey Search"	December 9, 2009	December 9, 2009
Single, hardworking, and career-focused, Maggie is ready to move out of her parents' place and into a three-bedroom home of her own. But although she's got the down payment she needs, this virgin admits she doesn't know the first thing about maintaining a sprawling suburban property.
76	11	"Britney & Guthrie" "Opposites Attract"	December 16, 2009	July 20, 2009
Beauty-queen Britney and her handyman, Guthrie, are hoping to buy an Austin, Texas home that will carry for less than their current rental. But while he dreams of a fixer-upper with a spacious garage, Britney's got other ideas.
77	12	"Peggy & Kevin" "Home Again"	December 23, 2009	October 28, 2009
Montreal based couple, Peggy and Kevin are moving back to Toronto, but will the reality of Toronto's real estate market be too much for these virgins?
78	13	"Runi & Thomas" "Lofty Lone Star Dreams"	December 30, 2009	August 24, 2009
Civil engineers, Thomas and Runi, have saved up a healthy down payment, and are hoping to find a spacious, Austin, Texas dream home to fit their lofty expectations. While he likes the finer things in life, she's typically more practical, and both agree that in a fluctuating economy, they don't want to get in over their heads.
79	14	"Mary" "Buyer and Landlord at Once"	December 30, 2009	September 30, 2009
A 25-year-old schoolteacher who's happy living with her parents in the suburbs, Mary is looking to buy a downtown Toronto property she can rent out for a tidy profit.
80	15	"Heather & Kristian" "Searching and Sacrificing"	December 30, 2009	September 7, 2009
After years of renting, Heather and Kristian want to buy a home in their upscale Toronto neighborhood. They love the pedestrian lifestyle and all the perks it offers. And they're hoping to find a spacious, charming, and affordable property where they can entertain in style.
81	16	"Robyn & Jim" "Living Large"	January 6, 2010	November 4, 2009
While fitness entrepreneur Jim is willing to spend top dollar on his first home, his wife Robyn has her eye on the bottom line. Growing up in a small town, these high school sweethearts got used to sprawling homes on ample lots. But when the first house the couple tours open their eyes, they put in a call to their mortgage broker. Will shopping at a higher price point deliver the starter home of their dreams?
82	17	"Karen & Cliff" "Once Losing, Now Acquiring"	January 13, 2010	September 23, 2009
Karen and Cliff lost 200 pounds between them, got themselves out of debt, and now, after some serious saving, are ready to invest in their first home. But will Karen's penny-pinching ways stand in the way of a sale?
83	18	"Chris & Daniella" "Danish Modern"	January 20, 2010	December 2, 2009
After living in six different countries, Denmark's Daniella is ready to put down roots in Toronto with husband Chris. They're looking to buy a modern home in a mature neighborhood, and their expectations are high.
84	19	"Kelly" "Handy Men Special"	February 17, 2010	November 18, 2009
Ready to take the real estate plunge, Kelly is hoping to buy a Philadelphia starter home for herself and her two friends. But with a seriously limited budget, she fears she'll either fall in love with a house she can't afford, or worse yet, end up with a real dive.
85	20	"Adam & Yimara" "New to Boston"	May 31, 2010	December 30, 2009
While there are many great neighborhoods in the Boston area, for Adam and Yimara there's only option, but when price point and style don't match something's gotta give.
86	21	"Ashley & Brad" "At Home in Princeton"	June 14, 2010	January 27, 2010
Ashley and Brad want a house the splits the difference between New York City and Philadelphia, but will these virgins be in for a tougher ride than they bargained for?
87	22	"Ginger & Scott" "Hammer Time"	June 21, 2010	January 13, 2010
Eager to find an investment property they can put a sledgehammer to, Ginger and Scott are looking to buy and renovate a duplex just outside Boston. But are these newbies truly ready to become homeowners and landlords?
88	23	"Christina & Clarence" "Boston Uncommon"	June 28, 2010	January 20, 2010
Christina and Clarence moved from Toronto to Boston a few years ago, and after putting down roots, are hoping to find a well-appointed suburban home where they can start a family.
89	24	"Mark" "Road Weary"	July 12, 2010	November 25, 2009
Desperate to end his crazy commute, New Hampshire's Mark is hoping to move out of his parents' place and into a bachelor pad of his own. The 24-year-old has saved up a tiny down payment and is looking for a maintenance-free, two-bedroom condo near Boston that fits his limited budget and active urban lifestyle.
90	25	"Danielle" "House vs. Condo"	July 26, 2010	January 6, 2010
After living in her parents' basement, business-savvy Danielle has saved up a tidy nest egg and is looking to buy a Boston home of her own. With her finances on track, she's looking forward to independent living. But even with the support of her family, she fears she might be jumping into home ownership too soon.
91	26	"Tom & Christina" "Meeting in the Middle"	August 23, 2010	December 16, 2009
Determined to put an end to their long-distance relationship commute, Tom and Christina are looking to settle down in the same city. Amazingly, the first home they visit delivers everything on the couple's wish list. But when they decide to view a few more properties, will they lose the dream home to another buyer?

=== Season 5 (2010) ===
- Note: This season was filmed around Miami and San Diego

No. overall	No. in season	Title	Original release date	Canadian air date
92	1	"Gabe" "Lofty Dreams"	September 13, 2010	April 7, 2010
In South Florida, Gabe has naive ideas about what makes the ultimate bachelor pad. He doesn't see the big picture, so Sandra has to step in and help.
93	2	"Amy & Jason" "Starting at the Top"	September 20, 2010	April 28, 2010
Tired of their tiny apartment, newlyweds Amy and Jason are dying to buy their first home. They agree they need plenty of space and lots of amenities, but with her New England charm and his Florida-native vibe, can they find a property that suits them both?
94	3	"Kenny & Angela" "The Last Move"	September 27, 2010	June 9, 2010
Tired of being in property limbo and moving from rental to rental with their two kids, Kenny and Angela are ready a buy their own home, settle down and unpack their boxes for good.
95	4	"Erika & Rodrigo" "Cut & Dried"	October 4, 2010	April 21, 2010
Very much in love and living in a cramped, bathroom-free shed at his parents' place, Erika and Rodrigo are ready to buy their South Florida dream home.
96	5	"Robin & Joe" "Market Blues"	October 11, 2010	June 2, 2010
Back in the US after three years in Japan, and with a tight budget and a Veteran's Affairs Loan requiring no down payment, Robin and Joe are hoping to buy a San Diego area home where they can raise their two kids in comfort.
97	6	"Crystal" "Crystal Clear"	October 18, 2010	April 14, 2010
As fun-loving as she is hard-working, Crystal has saved up a tidy nest egg and is now looking to buy a spectacular South Florida home for her and her beloved dog Jasmine.
98	7	"Frances & William" "Short Sale for the Long Run"	October 25, 2010	June 23, 2010
New parents Frances and William want to buy a home and be the first in their families to own property. They've made sacrifices to pull together a down payment. But will their limited resources end the dream before it gets off the ground?
99	8	"Lindsey & Ian" "Building a Dream"	November 1, 2010	May 12, 2010
Go-getters Lindsey and Ian are looking for a perfect, move-in ready Florida home for them and their dog, Pudgy. But with rigid requirements and a long list of luxurious expectations, can any property ever hope to measure up?
100	9	"Laura & Justin" "Unexpected Guests"	November 8, 2010	June 30, 2010
Tired of paying rent and ready to invest in their future, newlyweds Laura and Justin want to find a San Diego property with plenty of character. And although he's not afraid of sweat equity, she dreams of finding a picture-perfect home.
101	10	"Sean" "Fear of Commitment"	November 15, 2010	May 19, 2010
Adventure-seeking Sean is constantly traveling for work, and although he's terrified about buying his first condo, he's also tired of paying rent, knows it's time to invest, and is hoping to find a beachside property in South Florida where he can store more than just his suitcase.
102	11	"Ashli & Pete" "Baby on the Way"	November 22, 2010	May 26, 2010
With a baby on the way, newlyweds Ashli and Pete are hoping to find their first South Florida home. But with their two very different wish lists, can they find a property that suits their budget, their clashing styles, and their fast-approaching delivery date?
103	12	"Barbara & Erik" "Coastal Dreams"	November 29, 2010	July 7, 2010
Tired of living in their tiny rental, Barbara and Erik want to buy a move-in ready dream home in their favorite Oceanside neighborhood. They'd like to stay in über-exclusive La Jolla. But can they find an affordable property that fits their needs and budget?
104	13	"Rodney & Brenda" "The Long Road Home"	December 1, 2010	June 16, 2010
With their baby girl, Rodney and Brenda have outgrown their apartment and are hoping to find a three-bedroom San Diego dream home. But with high expectations and a single income, can they find the perfect property at a price they can afford?

=== Season 6 (2011) ===
- Note: This season was filmed around Toronto

No. overall	No. in season	Title	Original release date	Canadian air date
105	1	"Holly & Dan" "An Entertaining Home"	April 4, 2011	October 18, 2010
Newlyweds Holly and Dan want to move out of their one-bedroom rental and into their very own Toronto dream home, and they've set their sights on one of the city's most exclusive neighborhoods.
106	2	"Billy & Yenna" "Wanting It All"	April 4, 2011	October 11, 2010
Tired of living in a cramped rental apartment with her mother and brother, soon-to-be-wed Billy and Yenna are hoping to buy a spacious, feng shui-friendly suburban home they can all share.
107	3	"Tracy & Paul" "Small Town Big Dreams"	April 11, 2011	October 12, 2010
Tired of their cramped basement apartment, Tracy and Paul want to return to their rural roots and are hoping to find a dream home outside Toronto that will make them both happy.
108	4	"Melanie, Phil and Diane" "Two Homes in One"	April 11, 2011	October 13, 2010
Property virgins Melanie and Phil are joining forces with her mom, Diane, and by pooling their resources the trio hopes to buy a suburban Toronto home they can all share.
109	5	"Claudia & Raphael" "Neighborhood Sweet Neighborhood Search"	April 18, 2011	October 14, 2010
Ready to stop sharing a house with her mother and move into a home of their own, newlyweds Claudia and Raphael are hoping to find a budget-friendly property close to friends and family.
110	6	"Vera & Milton" "Home Sweet Townhome"	April 18, 2011	October 15, 2010
Vera and Milton are hoping to find a spacious Toronto family home. But with very different ideas about location, renovations and budget, they're not sure they can find a property they both can agree on.
111	7	"Erin" "Commuter Relief"	April 25, 2011	October 28, 2010
Veterinarian Erin is finally ready to trade in her car and grueling two-hour commute to find a Toronto-area condo that's closer to work. And she's hoping to stretch her limited budget to find a quiet location that suits her small-town sensibilities.
112	8	"Susan & Jason" "Color Block"	April 25, 2011	October 19, 2010
In order to save for a down payment, Susan and Jason have been living with his parents and now they're ready to find a Toronto-area home of their own. The only problem is he wants an urban Victorian home and she dreams of a ranch-style bungalow in the suburbs.
113	9	"Melanie" "Flying Home"	May 2, 2011	October 20, 2010
Flight attendant Melanie travels the world for work, but back at home, she's ready to buy her first ever Toronto condo to share with her beloved cat, Jinxi. Melanie's hoping for a lake view home complete with all the perks, and since she's already given notice on her rental apartment, she's got less than 60 days to make it happen.
114	10	"Kathleen" "Single in the City"	May 2, 2011	October 21, 2010
A single city gal who's tired of sharing a rental apartment with her two male roommates, Kathleen is ready to find a place of her own, and is looking for a swank Toronto condo with all the comforts.
115	11	"Chad & Jeff" "Cross Country Challenge"	May 9, 2011	October 22, 2010
After making the four-day drive from Vancouver, Jeff and Chad are looking for a swank Toronto condo to share with their beloved cat, Chopper. But with a long wish list and high expectations, are they prepared for the city's competitive property market?
116	12	"Maurie & Matthew" "Trendy Urban Home Search"	May 9, 2011	November 4, 2010
With a modest down payment and penchant for luxury, Maurie and Matthew are hoping to leave their seedy rental apartment behind and move into an upscale Toronto home of their own. They've set their sights on the city's trendiest neighborhood. But with their first-class tastes and five-star expectations, can they find a move-in ready property that fits their budget?
117	13	"Tara" "A Single Mom's Mission"	May 16, 2011	December 27, 2010
Tired of living with her parents, single mom Tara is determined to buy her own home, move, and settle in before she returns to the corporate world. But with just two months left of her maternity leave, finding the perfect move-in ready property could be a tall order.

=== Season 7 (2011) ===
- Note: This season was filmed around Toronto

No. overall	No. in season	Title	Original release date	Canadian air date
118	1	"Jonothon & Lindsay" "Homeward Bound"	August 29, 2011	April 11, 2011
Tired of living in his sister's basement and looking to buy a move-in-ready home of his own, naturopathic doctor Jonothon has his heart set on the mature inner-city neighborhood he grew up in. But with a limited budget and sky-high property values, will he agree to compromise on location?
119	2	"Mike & Linda" "A Shiny Future"	September 12, 2011	April 18, 2011
Ready to take their relationship to the next level, Mike and Linda want to move out of their parents' homes and into a picture-perfect home of their own. But with a limited budget and a massive wish list, they may be in for a shock.
120	3	"Alex & Aimee" "Feels Like Home"	September 12, 2011	April 25, 2011
Trading in the exotic lifestyle they enjoyed in Malaysia, married martial artists Aimee and Alex are now ready to buy a Toronto-area family home where they can put down roots.
121	4	"Rebecca" "Second Chances"	September 14, 2011	April 4, 2011
A small-town girl at heart, Rebecca works in the city but dreams of living in a quiet neighborhood, and she's hoping to find a transit-friendly suburban Toronto home complete with a big backyard and a basement apartment for her best friend.
122	5	"Sherri" "Homeward Mission"	September 19, 2011	May 2, 2011
After ten years of traveling the world as a humanitarian nurse, Sherri is ready for her next mission. She's hoping to invest her sizeable nest egg in a two-bedroom Toronto oasis where she can unpack her gear for good.
123	6	"Rachel & Todd" "A Perfect Fit"	September 19, 2011	May 9, 2011
Having moved over 20 times in the past ten years, humanitarian workers and world travelers Rachel and Todd are finally ready to put down roots in Toronto.
124	7	"Amanda & Vishnu" "Doors to Happiness"	September 26, 2011	May 16, 2011
With only 60 days to vacate their cramped basement rental, Amanda and Vishnu are searching for the perfect Toronto property, and are hoping to find a move-in-ready two-bedroom home in a pedestrian-friendly inner-city neighborhood.
125	8	"Neil" "Dream Investment"	September 26, 2011	May 23, 2011
After working in six different cities in the past year alone, 23-year-old Neil is tired of living on the road and paying rent. And since he's now landed a steady job in Toronto, he's hoping to buy a sprawling suburban home where he can settle down, and where his friends can move in to help pay the bills.
126	9	"Noel" "Sibling Realty"	October 3, 2011	June 7, 2011
Fast approaching 30 and ready to settle down, rock bar manager Noel is looking to buy a spacious Toronto condo that's just minutes from his workplace. And since he's already given notice to his landlord, he has just one month to find, buy and move into the bachelor pad of his dreams.
127	10	"Robin & Curtis" "Layout Holdout"	October 3, 2011	June 14, 2011
Robin and Curtis are serious about their relationship, and since she already spends most of her time at his place, they've decided to pool their resources and buy a spacious Toronto home they can share. The only problem is she wants an open-concept condo, and he wants a town home with a large outdoor space for entertaining.
128	11	"John & Vicky" "Making Plans"	October 17, 2011	June 21, 2011
John and Vicky have each lived with their parents since birth, and now that they're engaged, they want to buy and settle into their very own suburban dream home before they walk down the aisle.
129	12	"Kathy & Adam" "House Jitters"	October 17, 2011	June 28, 2011
Tired of living in her parents' basement, Kathy wants to buy a home of her own. And, as she's determined to move out before her 30th birthday, she's got just two months to track down the starter home of her dreams.
130	13	"Stephanie & Ed" "Location Fixation"	October 24, 2011	July 5, 2011
Stephanie and Ed have just returned from living in Geneva, and are now ready to put down roots in Toronto. They've saved up a hefty down payment with a dream home wish list to match. But with their sights set on an über-trendy neighborhood, are they in for sticker shock?

=== Season 8 (2012) ===
No. overall	No. in season	Title	Original release date	Canadian air date
131	1	"Dave & Andrea" "Move Over Manhattan"	April 4, 2012	January 10, 2012
Well-heeled New Yorkers Dave and Andrea are desperate to own their first home. But even with their hefty budget and sizeable down payment, they can't afford a Manhattan property that delivers everything on their wish list.
132	2	"Mary & Efi" "As Luck Would Have It"	April 4, 2012	January 17, 2012
With their feng shui requirements, newlyweds Mary and Efi are looking for the perfect starter home that's guaranteed to bring happiness and good fortune. But even with their healthy budget, their dreams may be too big for their wallets.
133	3	"Antonio & Ileana"	April 11, 2012	
After dating for eight months, city dwellers Antonio and Ileana can't wait to move out of Manhattan. Ready for a new start and an easy suburban commute, they're hoping to find a puppy-friendly home with plenty of privacy and space.
134	4	"Greg & Erin" "A Home of Their Own"	April 11, 2012	February 7, 2012
Greg and Erin have been renting a property in Yonkers but dream of raising their two daughters in a home of their own. They've saved up a down payment and now they're looking to put down permanent roots in a family-friendly community.
135	5	"Karen" "Character Building"	April 18, 2012	February 21, 2012
Single mom Karen has been living with her parents in New Jersey since her divorce six years ago. But now she's ready for a fresh new start and is searching for a home she can share with her eleven-year-old daughter.
136	6	"Jasmine & José" "American Dream"	April 18, 2012	January 24, 2012
Living the American dream, Jasmine and José both grew up in crowded, low-income apartments in New York City. But their hard word has paid off and now they're ready to purchase a multi-unit home they can share with her parents.
137	7	"Brian & Danielle" "Love at First Site"	April 25, 2012	February 28, 2012
Ready for the next chapter, newlyweds Brian and Danielle are looking for a suburban New Jersey home where they can settle down and start a family, and they're hoping to find a picture-perfect move-in-ready property in record time.
138	8	"James & Monica" "Diamond in the Rough"	April 25, 2012	March 20, 2012
James and Monica still live at home with their parents but they're ready to take their relationship to the next level. Instead of spending their money on a wedding, they're hoping to buy a two-family New Jersey home where their tenants' rent will help pay their mortgage.
139	9	"Adrienne & Kobir" "A Family Affair"	May 2, 2012	January 31, 2012
Adrienne and Kobir have been living in a Long Island apartment owned by her parents, and while it's allowed them to save a down payment, space and privacy are at a premium and the couple is ready to move their growing family into a starter dream home of their own.
140	10	"Ariana" "Bachelor Pad"	May 2, 2012	March 13, 2012
High school teacher and cheerleading coach Ariana is ready to strike out on her own, and with help from her contractor father, she's hoping to find a two-bedroom home she can put her personal stamp on.
141	11	"José & Prisca" "Beauty in the Bronx"	May 9, 2012	February 14, 2012
José and Prisca have worked hard to be able to afford a home of their own. Now ready for their share of the American dream, the couple is hoping to invest their nest egg and fulfill a long-standing family goal.
142	12	"Steve & Melissa" "Home Sweet Home"	May 9, 2012	March 6, 2012
Ready to start their new lives together, soon-to-be-weds Steve and Melissa are busy planning their big day and the last item on their list is a spacious home in Queens, New York.
143	13	"Mitch"	May 16, 2012	
Mitch lives with his parents and works with them in the family business. But now the 23-year-old is ready to buy his own Long Island home. That is, if he can find a property they can all agree on.
