= List of programs broadcast by CTV and CTV2 =

This is a list of programmes broadcast by the CTV Television Network and the CTV 2 television system in Canada. The list consists of television programs currently broadcast, programmes formerly aired, and programmes that are soon to be broadcast by the two Bell Media-owned networks. Former listings for CTV 2 include programmes aired by the system under its former brands CTV Two, A, A-Channel, and NewNet.

== Current programming ==
=== Original series ===
==== Drama ====
- Sullivan's Crossing (2023)

==== Reality ====
- The Amazing Race Canada (2013)
- Battle of the Generations (2023)
- The Traitors Canada (2023)

==== Talk shows ====
- The Social (2013) (Note: Airs on both CTV and CTV 2.)
- The Good Stuff with Mary Berg (2023)

==== News programming ====
- CTV National News (1961)
- Question Period (1967)
- etalk (1998)
- Your Morning (2016)

==== Awards shows ====
- Canadian Country Music Awards (2023)
- Canadian Screen Awards (2026)

=== Canadian repeats ===
- Cash Cab (CTV)
- Corner Gas (CTV 2)
- Fear Thy Neighbor (CTV 2)
- Flashpoint (CTV 2)
- Forensic Factor (CTV 2)
- Highway Thru Hell (CTV; previously on CTV 2)
- How It's Made (CTV 2)
- Just for Laughs Gags (CTV 2)
- The Littlest Hobo (mid-1960s, 1979–1992, 1997–2000, 2005–2011, 2023)
- Transplant (2020–2024 (CTV); 2024 (CTV 2))

=== American series ===
==== CTV ====
Show	Type	Original network	Aired since
9-1-1: Nashville	Drama	ABC	2025
Academy Awards	Awards show	ABC	1980
The Amazing Race	Reality	CBS	2001
American Music Awards	Awards show	ABC	1978
American Ninja Warrior	Reality	NBC	2016; 2019–20 (CTV 2)
The Big Bang Theory (reruns)	Sitcom	CBS	2007 (CTV 2); 2010 (CTV)
Boston Blue	Drama	CBS	2025
The Bold and the Beautiful	Soap opera	CBS	1995–2013; 2023–present (CTV); 2011–2023 (CTV 2)
Ballers (reruns)	Dramedy	HBO	2024
Catfish: The TV Show	Reality	MTV	previously also on CTV 2
Celebrity Jeopardy!	Game show	ABC	2022
The Conners (reruns)	Sitcom	ABC	2018
Crime Scene Kitchen	Reality	FOX	2024
Georgie & Mandy's First Marriage	Sitcom	CBS	2024
Golden Globe Awards	Awards show	NBC	1996
Grey's Anatomy	Drama	ABC	2005
Happy's Place	Sitcom	NBC	2024
Hell's Kitchen	Reality	FOX	2024
High Potential	Drama	ABC	2024
Jersey Shore: Family Vacation	Reality	MTV	
Judge Steve Harvey	Legal drama	ABC	2022
Late Night with Seth Meyers	Talk	NBC	2014–2016; 2023 (CTV); 2016–23 (CTV 2)
Lego Masters	Game show	FOX	2021; 2023 (CTV); 2022–23 (CTV 2)
Lingo	Game show	CBS	2023
Live with Kelly and Mark	Talk	Syndication	1998–2000; 2002; 2000–2002 (NewNet)
Love Island	Reality	CBS/Peacock	2019
Love Island Games	Reality	Peacock	2023
The Masked Singer	Reality	FOX	2019
MasterChef	Reality/competition	FOX	2010
MasterChef Junior	Reality/competition	FOX	2013
National Football League	Sports	ABC/CBS/NBC/FOX/Prime Video	2007
Only Murders in the Building	Comedy	Hulu	2024
Password	Game show	NBC	2022
Primetime Emmy Awards	Awards show	ABC/CBS/NBC/FOX	1988
Ridiculousness	Comedy	MTV	
The Rookie	Drama	ABC	2018
Seinfeld (reruns)	Sitcom	NBC/Global	1997–2005 (NewNet); 2017
Shark Tank	Reality	ABC	2011–2016 (CTV Two); 2016 (CTV)
Shifting Gears	Sitcom	ABC	2025
Snake Oil	Game show	FOX	2023
Special Forces: World's Toughest Test	Reality	FOX	2023
St. Denis Medical	Sitcom	NBC	2024
The Summit	Reality/competition	CBS	2024
Tracker	Drama	CBS	2024
Weakest Link	Game show	NBC/FOX	2020
Will Trent	Drama	ABC	2023
Wipeout	Game show	TBS	2021
Veep	Drama	HBO	2023
The View	Talk	ABC	1998
The Voice	Reality	NBC	2011–2019; 2024 (CTV); 2012–2016; 2019 (CTV 2)
Young Sheldon (reruns)	Sitcom	CBS	2017

==== CTV 2 ====
Show	Type	Original network	Aired since
The $100,000 Pyramid	Game show	ABC	2016–23 (CTV); 2023 (CTV 2)
According to Jim (reruns)	Sitcom	ABC	2023
Bob Hearts Abishola (reruns)	Sitcom	CBS	2019–24 (CTV); 2024 (CTV 2)
Celebrity Wheel of Fortune	Game show	ABC	2021–22 (CTV); 2022 (CTV 2)
Criminal Minds (reruns)	Drama	CBS	2023
Farmer Wants a Wife	Reality	FOX	2022
Next Level Chef	Reality	FOX	2022 (CTV); 2023 (CTV 2)
The Sopranos (reruns)	Drama	HBO	2023
Suits (reruns)	Drama	USA	2024
Superman & Lois	Drama	The CW	2022
Teen Mom: The Next Chapter (reruns)	Reality	MTV	
TMZ	Reality	Syndication	2007–2012 (CTV); 2022 (CTV 2)
The Tonight Show Starring Jimmy Fallon	Talk	NBC	2014
Westworld (reruns)	Drama	HBO	2024
The Wonderful World of Disney	Movies	ABC	2024

== Former programming ==
=== CTV ===
Canadian series

- 5-4-3-2-Run (1988–1990)
- 19-2 (2017)
- 21c (news) (2001–2004)
- Acorn the Nature Nut (1996–2007)
- Act Fast
- The Alan Thicke Show (1980–1983)
- Alice, I Think (reran on A-Channel)
- At Home
- The Amazing World of Kreskin
- Anne of Green Gables: The Animated Series (2008–2011)
- Anything You Can Do
- The Associates (2001–2002)
- Audubon Wildlife Theatre
- Balance: Television for Living Well
- The Barbara McNair Show
- Bigshots (1995–1996)
- Birdz (1999–2000)
- Bizarre (1980–1985)
- The Bobby Vinton Show (variety show)
- The Bobroom (comedy)
- Bonacini's Italy
- Bordertown
- Buddies (1967–1968)
- A Bunch of Munsch (1991–1992)
- The Camilla Scott Show (1995–1998 (BBS); 1998–2001)
- The Campbells (1986–1991)
- Canada AM (news/morning show) (1972–2016)
- Canada's Worst Driver
- Canada's Worst Handyman
- Canadian Idol (game show/singing competition) (2003–2008)
- The Capers
- Cardinal (2017–21)
- Carter (reruns)
- Check it Out! (comedy) (1985–1988)
- Children Ruin Everything (2022–2025)
- Circus
- Circle Ranch
- The City (drama) (1999–2000)
- Cross Country Cake Off (2022)
- Cold Squad (1998–2005)
- Committed (2001)
- Corner Gas (2004–2009)
- Counterstrike (1990–1993)
- Dancing with the Stars
- Dan for Mayor (sitcom) (2009–2010)
- Definition (1974–1989)
- Degrassi: The Next Generation (2001–2009)
- The Detail (2018)
- D'Myna Leagues (2000–2004)
- DNA Dinners
- Doctor's Diary
- Don't Stop Now (1986–1988)
- Double Exposure (comedy)
- Due South
- E.N.G. (1989–1994)
- The Eleventh Hour (2002–2005)
- Excuse My French (1974–1976)
- Extra, Extra (1987–1990)
- Fantastica (1973–1975)
- Farming for Love (2023–2024)
- FashionTelevision (2008–2012)
- Flying Rhino Junior High (1999–2002)
- Funny Farm (comedy) (1974–1975)
- Funtown
- F/X: The Series (1996–1998)
- George (1972–1973)
- Good Morning Canada (2000–2009)
- Grand Old Country (variety show) (1975–1981)
- Guess What (1983–1987)
- He Knows, She Knows (1972–1983)
- Headline Hunters (1970–1973)
- Heavy Rescue: 401
- Here Come the Seventies (1970–1973)
- Hiccups (sitcom) (2010–2011)
- Holmes Family Effect (2021)
- The Holmes Show (2002–2003)
- Holmes on Homes (reruns)
- HOMEstyle (1995–1997)
- Hootenanny
- Ian Tyson Show
- I Do, Redo (2020)
- The Indian Detective (2017; 2020)
- Instant Star (2004–2005)
- It's Your Move (game show) (1964–1967, 1974–1979)
- Jann (2019–2021)
- John Allan Cameron (variety show)
- Junior Talent Hour
- Juno Awards (2002–2019)
- Just for Laughs: All Access (also on CTV 2)
- Kareen's Yoga
- Katie and Orbie (1998–2000, 2003–2009)
- Katts and Dog (1988–1993)
- Kevin Spencer (Moved to The Comedy Network)
- Kids@Discovery (2002–2011)
- Kidstuff (1975–1979)
- Kingdom Adventure (1997–2011)
- A Kin to Win (1961–1964)
- Leaps and Bounds (1998–2001, 2004–2005)
- Learning the Ropes
- Let's Go (1976–1987)
- The Listener (2009–2014)
- Live It Up! (1978–1990)
- MacLear
- The Mad Dash (1978–1981)
- Magistrates Court
- Mantrap
- Marc's Music Shop (1970–1971)
- The Marilyn Denis Show (2011–2023)
- Mark McKinney Needs a Hobby (2024)
- Mary's Kitchen Crush
- Mary Makes It Easy
- MasterChef Canada (2014–21)
- Motive (2013–2016; 2020 (CTV 2))
- Mount Royal (1988)
- My Kind of Town (variety show)
- My Secret Identity (1988–1995)
- Mysterious Ways (2000–2002)
- Neon Rider (drama) (1990–1992)
- The New Avengers (1977)
- Night Heat (1985–1989)
- Once a Thief (1997–1998)
- Open Mike with Mike Bullard (1997–2003)
- Outdoor Sportsman
- OWL/TV (1990–1994)
- The Patsy Gallant Show
- Paul Hann and Friends (1985–1988)
- Pay Cards!
- People in Conflict (1962–1970)
- Perry's Probe (investigative journalism)
- Pierre Berton Hour
- Pig 'N' Whistle (1967–1977)
- Played (2013)
- Poetree and Friends (1995–2000)
- Police Surgeon (1972–1974)
- Pop Life
- Power Play (1998–2000)
- Puppet People (1971–1973)
- Puttnam's Prairie Emporium (1988–1990)
- The Red Fisher Show (1968–1969)
- RoadCrew (1996–1998 (BBS); 1998–2000)
- Robson Arms (2005–2008 (CTV); reran on CTV Two)
- The Rockets (1987–1992)
- Rocket Robin Hood
- Romper Room
- The Roy Jewell Farm Show
- The Sausage Factory (2002)
- Saving Hope (2012–2017)
- Search and Rescue
- Secret Lives
- Shelved (2023)
- Shirley (1989–1995)
- Snow Job (1983–1985)
- So You Think You Can Dance Canada (game show/dance competition) (2008–2011)
- Spider-Man
- SportsCentre (2007–2020)
- Spun Out (2014–2015)
- The Starlost (1973–1974)
- Stars on Ice (1976–1981)
- Story Theatre (1971–1975)
- Storytime (1981–1985)
- Super Pay Cards (1981–1982)
- Sight Unseen (2024–2025)
- Swiss Family Robinson (1974–1975)
- Take Your Choice
- Target: The Impossible (1973–1974)
- Telepoll (1961–1965)
- Ten is Five
- This Is Pop (2021)
- Thrill of a Lifetime (reality) (1981–1987)
- To Tell the Truth (game show) (1962–1964)
- The Traitors Canada (2023)
- Travel Magazine
- Travel, Travel!
- The Tree House
- The Trouble with Tracy (1970–1971)
- Twice in a Lifetime (1999–2001)
- The Ultimate Love Test (reality)
- Uncle Bobby (1968–1970)
- University of the Air (1966–1983)
- Untamed World (1968–1976, 1978–1985)
- Valerie Pringle Has Left The Building (2002–2006)
- W5 (1966–2024)
- Waterville Gang (1972–1973)
- Whatever Turns You On (1979–1980)
- What's My Line? (1978–1980)
- What's the Good Word?
- Whistler (2006–2008 (CTV); reran on A)
- Wide World of Sports (1964–1991; sports anthology)
- Wingding
- Wonder Why? (1990–2001)
- You Can't Do That on Television (1982–1985)
- You Really Can
- Zig Zag

American series

- 101 Ways to Leave a Game Show
- 8 Simple Rules (sitcom)
- 9-1-1: Lone Star (2020–25)
- Access Hollywood
- According to Jim (sitcom)
- Adam-12
- Adventures of the Gummi Bears (1989–1990)
- All Rise (2019–21)
- Archer
- American Housewife (2016–2019, 2020–21 (CTV); 2019 (CTV 2))
- American Idol
- Marvel's Agents of S.H.I.E.L.D. (2013–2020)
- Alaska Daily (2022–23)
- Alias (drama)
- Alice
- Ally McBeal (1997–2002)
- Almost Family (2019–20)
- Alter Ego (2021)
- America's Funniest People (1990–1995)
- America's Got Talent: Fantasy League (2024)
- Anderson Live (talk show)
- Andy Barker, P.I.
- The Andy Griffith Show
- Animal World
- Another World (1970–1999)
- Anything But Love
- Arrow
- @midnight
- Awkwafina Is Nora from Queens
- Barnaby Jones
- Batfink (1967–1968)
- Batman
- Battlestar Galactica
- Baywatch (1990)
- Beat the Clock
- The Beatles (1966–1968)
- Benson
- Best of the West
- Bethenny (talk show)
- Bewitched (1964–1972)
- Big Shots
- The Bionic Woman
- Blansky's Beauties
- Blindspot (2015–2020)
- The Bob Newhart Show
- The Bold and The Beautiful
- Bob Patterson (2001)
- B Positive (2020–22)
- The Brady Bunch (1971–1974)
- Bridget Loves Bernie
- Broad City
- Buck Rogers in the 25th Century
- Call Me Kat (2021–23)
- The Carol Burnett Show (1969–1971)
- The Challenge: USA (2023)
- Charlie's Angels
- The Charlie Horse Music Pizza (1998–1999)
- Charmed (1998–2000, 2002–2004)
- Cheers (1984–1993)
- City (1990)
- Claim to Fame (2022; moved to Citytv)
- Close to Home (2005–2007)
- Code Black (2015–2018)
- Columbo
- Comedy Central Stand-Up Presents
- Commander-in-Chief (political drama)
- The Company You Keep (2023)
- Conan (2010–2021)
- The Cosby Show (1985–1992)
- The Courtship of Eddie's Father
- Crank Yankers (2023)
- Criminal Minds: Beyond Borders (2016–2017)
- Criminal Minds: Suspect Behavior (2011)
- CSI: Crime Scene Investigation (2000–2015)
- CSI: Cyber (2015–2016)
- CSI: Miami (2002–2012)
- CSI: NY (2004–2013)
- Curb Your Enthusiasm (reruns; 2023–2024)
- Cybill
- The Daily Show with Trevor Noah
- Damon (1998)
- Dan August
- Daddio (2000; season 2)
- Delvecchio
- Desperate Housewives (2004–2012)
- Dexter
- A Different World (1987–1993)
- Diff'rent Strokes
- Dirty Sexy Money (CTV and CTV Two)
- Disney's One Saturday Morning (1997–1998 (BBS); 1998–2002)
- Donny and Marie (1976–1979)
- Doctor Odyssey (2024–25)
- The Dr. Oz Show (2009–22) (also on CTV 2)
- Dr. Quinn, Medicine Woman (1993–1995, 1998; 1995–1998 (BBS))
- Dr. Vegas (2004)
- The Drew Carey Show (1995–1998 (BBS); 1998–2004)
- Drive (drama)
- Dr. Phil (2002–23)
- The Dukes of Hazzard
- East New York (2022–23)
- Ellen (previously on BBS; 1998)
- The Ellen DeGeneres Show (2004–2022 (CTV 2); 2011–2022 (CTV))
- Ellen's Game of Games (2017–21)
- Emergence (2019–2020)
- Emergency!
- ER (1994–2009)
- The Everly Brothers Show (1970)
- The F.B.I.
- Fairview (2023)
- Falcon Crest
- The Fall Guy
- Family Affair
- Family Matters (1990–1993)
- Felicity (1998–2000)
- Filthy Rich (2020–21)
- Fish
- The Flash
- For Life (2020–21)
- For Love or Money (reality)
- For Your Love (1998)
- Game of Thrones
- GCB (2012)
- The Geena Davis Show (2000–2001)
- Gemini Man
- General Hospital
- Generation Gap (2022–23)
- Getting Personal (1998)
- Ghost Whisperer (2005–2007)
- Gilligan's Island
- God Friended Me (2018–2020)
- The Good Doctor (2017–24)
- Good Times
- Grand Hotel (2019)
- The Greatest American Hero
- Grimm (2011–2017)
- Growing Pains
- Happy Hour
- Hardcastle and McCormick
- The Hardy Boys/Nancy Drew Mysteries
- Harry O
- Hart to Hart (1979–1984)
- Here's Lucy
- Holey Moley (2021–22)
- Home Economics (2021–22)
- Home Improvement (1998–1999)
- Hope & Faith (sitcom)
- Hotel
- How to Get Away with Murder (2014–2020)
- Hudson Street (1995–1996)
- Human Target
- I Dream of Jeannie (1966–1970)
- The Invisible Man
- Ironside
- Intelligence (2014)
- It's a Living
- The Jackie Thomas Show (1992–1993)
- Jake and the Fatman
- Jeannie
- Jericho (drama)
- Jersey Shore: Family Vacation
- Joan of Arcadia (comedy/drama)
- Joe Forrester
- Joe Millionaire: For Richer or Poorer (2022)
- Kaz
- Knots Landing
- Kojak
- Kung Fu (1973–1975)
- Kung Fu: The Legend Continues
- L.A.'s Finest (2019–21)
- Lanigan's Rabbi
- The Late Late Show with James Corden (2015–16 (CTV Two); 2016–23)
- Law & Order (1990–1996, 1998–2010; 1996–1998 (BBS))
- Law & Order: Criminal Intent
- Law & Order: Trial by Jury (legal drama)
- Law & Order: Special Victims Unit (1999–2021)
- The Lawrence Welk Show
- Leave It to Beaver
- Legends of Tomorrow
- Less than Perfect (sitcom)
- Life on a Stick (sitcom)
- Life with Bonnie (sitcom)
- The Lone Ranger (1966–1967)
- Lonesome Dove: The Series (1994–1996)
- Longstreet
- Love in the Wild (2011–2012)
- Lucifer (2016–2018)
- Mad About You (reruns) (2021–2022)
- Mad Men
- Magnum, P.I. (1980–1988)
- Magnum P.I. (2018 TV series) (2018–22)
- Man From Atlantis
- Mannix
- Marcus Welby, M.D.
- The Masked Dancer (2020–21)
- Match Game (2016–21)
- Matlock
- Matt Houston
- McCloud
- McMillan & Wife
- Melrose Place (previously on BBS; 1998–1999)
- Medical Investigation (2004–2005)
- The Michael Richards Show (2000)
- The Mentalist (2008–2009 (A), 2009–2015 (CTV))
- Miami Vice
- The Mighty Jungle (1996–1998)
- The Millers (2014–2015)
- Missing (2012)
- The Mod Squad
- Models Inc. (1994–1995)
- The Mole (reality)
- Moonlighting
- Murphy Brown (1988–1998)
- The Mysteries of Laura (2014–2016)
- The Naked Truth (1995–1996 (BBS); 1997–1998)
- The New Adventures of Winnie the Pooh (1989–1991)
- Newlyweds: Nick and Jessica (reality)
- Night Court (1984–1989)
- The Nine (drama)
- Nip/Tuck (drama)
- No Ordinary Family (crime drama)
- The Norm Show
- NYPD Blue (1993–1994)
- The O.C. (drama)
- October Road (drama) (Season 1 did not air in Canada)
- On Our Own (1994–1995)
- One Day at a Time (sitcom)
- One Ocean View (reality)
- Operation Petticoat
- The Oprah Winfrey Show (previously on BBS; 1998–2011)
- The Osbournes (reality)
- The Parent Test (2023)
- People's Choice Awards (1979–2005)
- Petrocelli
- Picket Fences
- Pimp My Ride (reality)
- Pivoting (2022)
- Planet of the Apes
- Police Woman
- Politically Incorrect (1998–1999)
- Project UFO
- Promised Land (1997–1998)
- Punk'd (2003–2004)
- Queens (2021–22)
- Quincy, M.E.
- Rebel (2021)
- The Red Line (2019)
- Rescue 911 (docudrama)
- The Resident (2018–23)
- Resurrection (2014–2015)
- The Robert Guillaume Show (1989)
- The Rockford Files (1976–1979)
- Rocky & His Friends
- The Rookie: Feds (2022–23)
- The Rookies
- Room for Two (1992–1993)
- Roseanne (1988–1997)
- Roswell (1999–2000)
- Rowan & Martin's Laugh-In (1968–1969)
- Salvage 1
- Sanford and Son
- Scarecrow and Mrs. King
- Scrubs (sitcom) (2001–2008)
- The Shannara Chronicles (reruns; 2023)
- The Simple Life (reality)
- The Simple Life 2: Road Trip (reality)
- The Simple Life 3: Interns (reality)
- The Sinbad Show (1993–1994)
- Siskel & Ebert & the Movies (previously on BBS; 1998–1999)
- The Six Million Dollar Man
- Smith
- Somerset
- The Sonny & Cher Show
- So You Think You Can Dance (2005–2015)
- Soul Man
- Soul Train
- Southland (2009)
- South Park (2020–23)
- Space Ghost (1966–1967)
- Spenser: For Hire
- Spin City (1996–2000)
- Sports Night
- Star Trek
- Star Wars: The Clone Wars (2008–2009)
- Station 19 (2018–24)
- The Streets of San Francisco
- Studio 60 on the Sunset Strip (drama)
- Stumptown (2019–20)
- Suddenly Susan (1999–2000)
- Supermarket Sweep (2020–22)
- The Survivors
- Switch
- Tarzán
- Tattingers (1988–1989)
- Teen Mom OG (reruns)
- Temperatures Rising
- Texas
- That '80s Show (sitcom)
- Third Watch (1999–2005)
- This Is Not Happening (reruns)
- This Is Us (2016–22)
- Tommy Lee Goes to College (reality)
- Truth or Consequences
- Two and a Half Men (2007–2012 (CTV Two); 2012–2015 (CTV))
- Twenty Good Years
- Unforgettable (2011–2014, 2020; 2014 (CTV Two))
- Ultimate Tag (2020)
- Unsolved Mysteries (1990–1997)
- Vega$
- Veronica's Closet (1997–2000)
- Veronica Mars (drama)
- The Waltons (1976–1979)
- Watching Ellie (2002–2003)
- Weakest Link
- Welcome to The Captain (comedy)
- The West Wing (1999–2005)
- What About Joan? (2001)
- Whitney
- Who Do You Think You Are? (2022)
- Whose Line Is it Anyway?
- Without a Trace (2007–2009)
- Wonder Woman
- World of Dance (2017–20; 2018–19 (CTV 2))
- Workaholics
- The X Factor (2011–2013)
- Zoey's Extraordinary Playlist (2020–21)

Miscellaneous

- Brat Camp (reality)
- Department S (1969–1970)
- The Prisoner (1967)
- Randall and Hopkirk (Deceased)
- The Real Dirty Dancing (2022)
- The Secret Service (1970–1971)
- Spyforce (1973–1975)
- Supernanny (reality)
- The Sweeney
- UFO
- The Unusual Suspects (2022)
- World Idol (international game show)

=== CTV 2 ===
Canadian series

- A Morning
- A News
- Breakfast Television (1995–2008)
- Canada's Worst Driver
- Careers TV (2000–2009)
- Charlie Jade (2005–2007)
- CityLine (1995–2008)
- Collar of Duty (2022)
- Daily Planet
- Dotto's Data Cafe (2003–2005)
- Dotto Tech (2003–2009)
- Dr. Keri: Prairie Vet
- The Electric Playground (1999–2007)
- Hellfire Heroes
- Jade Fever
- Jeff Ltd. (2006–2007 (CTV); 2007–2008)
- Little Bird (2024)
- Mighty Cruise Ships
- Missing (2003–2009)
- Mud Mountain Haulers
- Relic Hunter (2006–2009)
- Reviews on the Run (2003–2007)
- Ride (2023)
- Road to Avonlea (2008–2011)
- Rookie Blue (reruns)
- Spencer's Big 30
- Vintage Tech Hunters

American series

- 7th Heaven (2001–2007)
- 30 Rock (2006–2007 (CTV); 2007–2008)
- Adorableness
- Alex, Inc. (2018)
- All American: Homecoming (2022–24)
- All My Children (1998–2011)
- Almost Paradise (reruns; 2023–24)
- America's Funniest Home Videos (1990–1997 (CTV); 2002–2009)
- America's Got Talent: All-Stars (2023)
- America's Got Talent: Extreme (2022)
- America's Most Wanted (1997–2000 (CTV); 2000–2006)
- America's Next Top Model (2004–2013)
- Anger Management (2012–2013 (CTV); 2013–2019)
- Babylon 5 (1995–1997)
- Baywatch Nights (1995–1997)
- Big Bad Beetleborgs
- The Big Leap (2021–22)
- Big Sky (2020–2022 (CTV); 2022–23)
- Billboard Music Awards (2011–18 (CTV); 2019–22)
- Buffy the Vampire Slayer (1997–2003)
- The Burning Zone (1996–1997)
- Castle (2009–2016, 2019; 2010–2016 (CTV))
- The Challenge (reruns)
- Cleopatra 2525 (2000–2001)
- Comedy Now! (reruns)
- COPS (1997–1999 (CTV); 2000–2006)
- The Crow: Stairway to Heaven (1998–1999)
- Dateline (1994-1999 (CTV); 2010–2016)
- Daytime Divas (2019)
- Dirty Sexy Money (2007 (CTV); 2007–2009)
- Donny & Marie (1998–1999)
- Don't Forget the Lyrics! (2007–2009)
- Drunk History (reruns; previously also on CTV)
- Eleventh Hour (2008–2009)
- Eli Stone (2008–2009)
- Ex on the Beach (reruns)
- Families of the Mafia
- Fashion Star (2012–2013)
- Floribama Shore (reruns)
- The Goldbergs (2013–21 (CTV); 2021–23 (CTV 2))
- Goode Behavior (1996–1997)
- Gossip Girl (2007–2008 (CTV); 2008–2010)
- Gotham (2014–2017 (CTV); 2017–2019)
- The Hills (reruns)
- The Hills: New Beginnings (2020–2022)
- Homeboys in Outer Space (1996–1997)
- Hope & Faith (2005–2006)
- Hot in Cleveland (2010–2020)
- HouseBroken (2021)
- In the Dark (2020 (CTV); 2020–22)
- Jack of All Trades (2000)
- Jeopardy! (previously on BBS; 1998–2008 (CTV); 2008)
- Jericho (2006–2008)
- The Kids Are Alright (2018–2019 (CTV); 2019)
- Kung Fu (2021–23)
- Kyle XY (2007–2008)
- La Brea (2021–23 (CTV); 2024)
- Late Night with Conan O'Brien (1995–2009)
- Late Night with Jimmy Fallon (2009–2014)
- Love Boat: The Next Wave (1998–1999)
- Lindsay Lohan's Beach Club (reruns)
- Mad Men (2008–2009)
- Martin (1995–1997)
- Medium (2005–2008 (CTV); 2009–2011)
- Messyness (2022)
- Miami Medical (2010)
- Mighty Trains (reruns)
- Mike & Molly (2010–21)
- Modern Family (reruns)
- Monk (2002–2008)
- Nikita (2010–2013)
- Not Dead Yet (2023–24)
- Once Upon a Time (2011–2017 (CTV); 2017–2018)
- One Life to Live (2002–2009)
- Our Kind of People (2021–22)
- Outmatched (2020)
- Pandora (2020)
- Primetime (2003–2006)
- The Protector (2011)
- Punk'd (reruns)
- Pushing Daisies (2008–2009)
- Reno 911! (reruns)
- Samantha Who? (2007–2009)
- The Sentinel (1996–1999)
- Skysurfer Strike Force (1995–1997)
- Siesta Key
- Smallville (2005–2008)
- Six Feet Under (reruns; 2023–24)
- Stargate Atlantis (2009–2010)
- Stargate SG-1 (2007–2009)
- Stargate Universe (2010–2011)
- Star Trek: Voyager (1995–2004)
- Summerland (2004–2005)
- Supernanny (2005–2008)
- Temptation Island (2022–23)
- Terminator: The Sarah Connor Chronicles
- 'Til Death (reruns; 2023–24)
- The Tonight Show with Jay Leno (1995–2009, 2010–2014)
- Tosh.0
- True Life
- True Lies (2023)
- Touched by an Angel (1997–2007)
- Undercover Boss (2010–2012 (CTV); 2013)
- Unforgettable (2011–2014 (CTV), 2014)
- Up All Night (2011–2012)
- The Vampire Diaries (2009–2010 (CTV); 2010–2017)
- Walker (2021–24)
- Wheel of Fortune (previously on BBS; 1998–2003 (CTV); 2007–2008)
- Who Wants to Be a Millionaire (1999–2002 (CTV); 2002–2009, 2023–24)
- Wife Swap (2008–2009)
- The Winchesters (2023)
- WWF Monday Night Raw (reruns only; 1993–1998)
- Younger
- Your Face or Mine? (2022)

=== BBS ===
- All-American Girl (1994–1995)
- 101 Dalmatians: The Series (1997–1998)
- Bone Chillers (1996–1997)
- Boy Meets World (1993–1998)
- Brand Spankin' New! Doug
- Chicago Sons (1997)
- Cosby (1996–1997)
- DuckTales (reruns; 1997)
- Family Album (1993)
- It Had to Be You (1993)
- Gargoyles
- Hardball (1994)
- Joe's Life (1993)
- Jungle Cubs
- Life's Work (1996–1997)
- Men Behaving Badly (1996–1997)
- The Mighty Ducks
- Nightmare Ned (1997)
- Quack Pack
- Recess
- The Smurfs (reruns)
- The Lion King's Timon and Pumbaa
- Toronto Blue Jays AL baseball (1992–1996)
- Townies (1996)
- The Trouble with Larry (1993)
- Under Suspicion (1994–1995)
- X-Men

=== Access/CTV 2 Alberta ===
- Acorn the Nature Nut (1995–2005)
- The Addams Family (1998–2001)
- Adventures in Rainbow Country (January 1986–December 1988)
- The Adventures of Bee Alert Bert (1999–2002)
- Adventures of Dudley the Dragon (1993–2008)
- Alive! (1995–2000)
- Ants in Your Pants (2001–2004)
- Arthur
- Babar (2001–2004)
- Bali
- Barney Miller (1998–2000)
- Beezoo's Attic (1999–2002)
- The Big Comfy Couch (1995–2000)
- Bobby's World (2000–2001)
- The Body Works (1980–1991)
- Bookmice (1995–1999)
- Boris Brott and Those Magnificent Music Machines (1985–1988)
- The Bush Baby (1993–1997)
- CG Kids
- CNET Central (1997)
- Computer Chronicles (1996–1999)
- Corduroy
- Dave Chalk's Computer Show (1997)
- Deafplanet
- Destinos (1993–2011)
- Dino Dan
- Doctor Snuggles (1985–1991)
- Dotto's Data Cafe (1996–2004)
- Down to Earth
- Elliot Moose (1999–2003)
- Eric's World (1992–1998)
- Family Feud
- Finding Stuff Out
- The Friendly Giant
- F.R.O.G
- George Shrinks
- Get Outta Town
- Green Acres (1998–2000)
- Groundling Marsh (1996–2009)
- Harriet's Magic Hats (1980–1997)
- The Hoobs (2002–2006)
- Igloo Gloo
- Inquiring Minds (1995–2000)
- Iris the Happy Professor
- Jakers! The Adventures of Piggley Winks
- Join In! (1990–1995)
- The Jungle Room (2007–2013)
- Kid's Planet Video (1998–2001)
- Kimba the White Lion (2001–2005)
- Kitty Cats (1992–1997)
- The Koala Brothers
- Lift Off (1993–1997)
- Little Bear (2001–2005)
- Little Star (2000–2005)
- L&J News (1996–2000)
- The Magic Box (2001–2005)
- The Magic Library (1990–1999)
- The Magic School Bus (2002–2004)
- Making Stuff
- Math Factor (1995–2015)
- The MAXimum Dimension (2000–2002)
- Mighty Machines (2004–2012)
- Miss BG
- Mustard Pancakes (2005–2009)
- Namaste (2005–2013)
- The New Explorers (1995–1999)
- Noddy (1985–1987)
- Noonbory and the Super 7 (2009–2011)
- The Ocean Room (2010–2014)
- Open Book (2001–2005)
- Panda Bear Daycare (2000–2003)
- Parlez-moi (1979–1995)
- Peep and the Big Wide World (2004–2008)
- Pictionary (1997–1998)
- Planet Echo
- Polka Dot Door (1973–1999)
- Pop It!
- The Prime Radicals (2012)
- Readalong (1976–1991)
- Renegadepress.com
- Return to the Magic Library (1991–1999)
- Ricky's Room (2002–2006)
- Rob the Robot (2012)
- Rockabye Bubble (2000–2003)
- Roger's New Reality (1999–2002)
- Room for Five
- Ruffus the Dog (2000–2003)
- Sagwa, the Chinese Siamese Cat (2003–2007)
- Science Alive (1992–2000)
- Sex Wars (2000–2002)
- Shimmy (2007–2012)
- Spilled Milk (2001–2003)
- Spin City (2002–2003)
- Star Trek: Deep Space Nine (2004–2005)
- Survey of Western Art (1994–2000)
- System Crash (2009–2011)
- Taste Buds (2008–2015)
- Think Big (2009–2012)
- This is Daniel Cook
- This is Turtle Island (2009–2014)
- Timothy Goes to School
- Turtle Island (2002–2005)
- Today's Special (January 13, 1986 – 1996)
- To Tell the Truth (2000–2002)
- The Toy Castle (2001–2011)
- Troupers (1993–1995)
- Tumbletown Tales
- Wakanheja (2004–2005)
- Walter Melon (1998–2001)
- Where on Earth Is Carmen Sandiego? (1998–2001)
- Who Wants to Be a Millionaire
- Wimzie's House (2006–2011)
- Wishbone (1996–1999)
- Wonder Why? (1992–1999)
- Written in Canada (2005–2007)
- Zoboomafoo

=== ASN ===
Canadian series

- 20 Minute Workout
- 100 Huntley Street
- Acorn the Nature Nut
- Adderly
- Adventures in Rainbow Country
- African Skies
- The Amazing World of Kreskin
- Babar
- Bits and Bytes
- Bookmice
- Breakfast Television
- The Camilla Scott Show
- Canadian Football League (1987–1990)
- Care Bears
- CityLine
- The Crow: Stairway to Heaven
- Earth: Final Conflict
- Ed's Night Party
- FashionTelevision
- Fighting Words
- First Wave
- Jackpot
- Katts & Dog
- Landscape of Geometry
- MediaTelevision
- Micro Magic
- MovieTelevision
- My Pet Monster
- N3tv
- Neon Rider
- Oopsy Daisy
- Polka Dot Door
- Professor Moffett's Science Workshop
- Rags to Riches
- Ray Bradbury Theater
- The Red Fisher Show
- The Science Alliance
- Size Small
- Today's Special
- Tree House
- University of the Air
- Vicki Gabereau
- Vid Kids
- You Can't Do That on Television
- Zig Zag

American series

- All My Children (1998–2011)
- America's Funniest Home Videos
- Batman: The Animated Series
- Beetleborgs Metallix
- Blind Date
- Blossom
- The Bob Newhart Show
- Bravestarr
- Breaker High
- Buffy the Vampire Slayer
- Carol Burnett and Friends
- Challenge of the GoBots
- Cheers (reruns)
- COPS
- Counterstrike
- Dempsey and Makepeace
- The Disney Afternoon/Disney-Kellogg Alliance
- Disney's Doug
- DuckTales
- Fame
- Family Feud
- Family Ties (reruns)
- The Flintstones
- Fraggle Rock
- Friends (reruns)
- Goof Troop
- Guiding Light
- Head of the Class
- Highlander: The Series
- Home Improvement
- House Calls
- The Howie Mandel Show
- Jem
- Jeopardy! (1991–2008)
- Kidsworld
- Kung Fu
- Live with Regis & Kelly
- Maury
- Melrose Place
- The New Candid Camera
- New You
- Night Court (reruns)
- The Oprah Winfrey Show
- Outlaws
- The People's Court
- Perfect Strangers
- Power Rangers in Space
- Power Rangers Power Playback
- Robotech
- Sailor Moon
- Santa Barbara
- Scooby-Doo
- Seinfeld (reruns)
- Smurfs Adventures
- Spin City
- The Shnookums and Meat Funny Cartoon Show
- Supermarket Sweep
- Star Trek: The Next Generation
- Star Trek: Voyager
- Teenage Mutant Ninja Turtles
- That's Life
- Throb
- Timon & Pumbaa
- Tiny Toon Adventures
- The Tonight Show with Jay Leno
- Touched by an Angel
- The Transformers
- The View
- V.I.P.
- Wheel of Fortune (1991–2008)
- Whose Line Is It Anyway?
- The Wonderful World of Disney
- WKRP in Cincinnati
- WWF Superstars

== See also ==
- CTV Television Network
- CTV 2
- Lists of Canadian television series
- List of Canadian television channels
