= MasterChef Canada season 3 =

Season of television series

MasterChef Canada
- Season 3
- No. of episodes: 15

Release
- Original network: CTV
- Original release: February 14 – June 19, 2016

Season chronology
- ← Previous; Season 2 Next → Season 4

The third season of MasterChef Canada originally aired on February 14, 2016 and concluded on June 19. Open casting call audition tryouts were held in mid-summer 2015. Filming began in early September of 2015 and wrapped up in November 2015. Torontonian Mary Berg won this season to become the first female winner of MasterChef Canada.

This season's competition featured only 14 contestants as opposed to the previous 2 season's 16 competitors. The audition format was changed, requiring the applicant hopefuls to receive an affirmative thumbs-up from all three judges unanimously to instantly earn a spot in the competition, while others that received less than three "yes" votes had to compete in a second chance two-round battle. This is also the last season in which the finale format had the finalists join the judges in the private dining room at the end of each hourlong cook-off round for the tasting and critiques of their dishes.

Following her victory, Berg pursued her passion for food through catering, confections, recipe development and as a cooking expert on CTV's Your Morning, The Social, and The Marilyn Denis Show. Berg also guest starred in episodes of seasons four, five and seven of MasterChef Canada, and later joined the judging panel starting with season eight. She also hosted her own original cooking television shows, Mary's Kitchen Crush (2019-2020) and Mary Makes It Easy (2021–present) for CTV and CTV Life Channel, as well as The Good Stuff with Mary Berg, a daytime talk show on CTV.

Runner-up Jeremy Senaris and April Lee Baker, who finished in fifth place, both returned to Season 7's MasterChef Canada: Back to Win. April Lee withdrew from the competition in 11th place while Jeremy came in 6th place.

== Top 14 ==
| Contestant | Age | Hometown | Occupation | Status |
|---|---|---|---|---|
| Mary Berg | 25 | Toronto, Ontario | Insurance broker | Winner June 19 |
| Jeremy Senaris | 34 | Winnipeg, Manitoba | Building plan examiner | Runner-Up June 19 |
| Matthew Astorga | 25 | Pitt Meadows, British Columbia | Digital design consultant | Eliminated June 12 |
| Veronica Cham | 35 | Toronto, Ontario | Lawyer | Eliminated June 5 |
| April Lee Baker | 38 | Calgary, Alberta | Homemaker | Eliminated May 29 |
| Shawn Karls | 29 | Montreal, Quebec | Doctor | Eliminated May 8 |
| Terry Adido | 33 | Edmonton, Alberta | PhD law student | Eliminated May 1 |
| Jennifer Baglione | 23 | Maple, Ontario | Salon manager | Eliminated April 24 |
| Jacqueline Clark | 29 | Abbotsford, British Columbia | Accountant | Eliminated April 17 |
| Michelle Nault | 37 | Bolton, Ontario | Teacher | Eliminated April 10 |
| Julia Mark | 30 | Burnaby, British Columbia | Make-up artist | Eliminated March 27 |
| Sean Hickey | 47 | London, Ontario | Auto worker | Eliminated March 20 |
| Vince Spitale | 41 | Pickering, Ontario | Contractor | Eliminated March 13 |
| David Young | 32 | Moncton, New Brunswick | Carpenter | Eliminated March 6 |

== Elimination table ==
| Place | Contestant | Episode | | | | | | | | | | | | | | | | | | | |
| Place | Contestant | 3 | | 4 | 5 | | 6 | 7 | | 8 | 9 | 10 | | 11 | 12 | | 13 | | 14 | | 15 |
|---|---|---|---|---|---|---|---|---|---|---|---|---|---|---|---|---|---|---|---|---|---|
| 1 | Mary | HIGH | IN | PT | IN | LOW | WIN | IN | WIN | PT | LOW | HIGH | WIN | WIN | HIGH | WIN | WIN | IMM | WIN | IMM | WINNER |
| 2 | Jeremy | IN | IN | NPT | HIGH | IN | WIN | IN | IN | NPT | PT | IN | WIN | PT | IN | WIN | IN | PT | IN | PT | RUNNER-UP |
| 3 | Matthew | IN | WIN | NPT | IN | IN | PT | IN | IN | LOW | WIN | WIN | IMM | LOW | WIN | IMM | IN | LOW | IN | ELIM | |
| 4 | Veronica | HIGH | LOW | WIN | IN | WIN | PT | WIN | IMM | NPT | WIN | HIGH | IN | WIN | HIGH | LOW | IN | ELIM | | | |
| 5 | April Lee | IN | IN | WIN | HIGH | IN | PT | IN | LOW | WIN | PT | IN | IN | WIN | IN | ELIM | | | | | |
| 6 | Shawn | WIN | IMM | WIN | IN | IMM | WIN | HIGH | WIN | LOW | WIN | IN | LOW | ELIM | | | | | | | |
| 7 | Terry | IN | IMM | WIN | WIN | IMM | LOW | HIGH | WIN | WIN | WIN | IN | ELIM | | | | | | | | |
| 8 | Jennifer | IN | LOW | WIN | WIN | IMM | WIN | IN | LOW | WIN | ELIM | | | | | | | | | | |
| 9 | Jacqueline | IN | IN | PT | HIGH | WIN | WIN | IN | IN | ELIM | | | | | | | | | | | |
| 10 | Michelle | IN | WIN | WIN | IN | IN | NPT | IN | ELIM | | | | | | | | | | | | |
| 11 | Julia | IN | IN | WIN | HIGH | IMM | ELIM | | | | | | | | | | | | | | |
| 12 | Sean | IN | IN | LOW | IN | ELIM | | | | | | | | | | | | | | | |
| 13 | Vince | IN | IMM | ELIM | | | | | | | | | | | | | | | | | |
| 14 | David | IN | ELIM | | | | | | | | | | | | | | | | | | |

(WINNER) This cook won the competition.
(RUNNER-UP) This cook finished in second place.
(WIN) The cook won the individual challenge (Mystery Box Challenge, Pressure Test or Elimination Test).
(WIN) The cook was on the winning team in the Team Challenge and was directly advanced to the next round.
(HIGH) The cook was one of the top entries in the Mystery Box Challenge, but did not win, or received considerable praise during an Elimination Test.
(PT) The cook was on the losing team in the Team Challenge or did not win the individual challenge, but won the Pressure Test.
(IN) The cook was not selected as a top entry or bottom entry in an individual challenge.
(IN) The cook was not selected as a top entry or bottom entry in a team challenge.
(IMM) The cook did not have to compete in that round of the competition and was safe from elimination.
(IMM) The cook was selected by Mystery Box Challenge winner and did not have to compete in the Elimination Test.
(PT) The cook was on the losing team in the Team Challenge, competed in the Pressure Test, and advanced.
(NPT) The cook was on the losing team in the Team Challenge, but was exempted from the Pressure Test
(RET) The cook was eliminated but come back to compete to return to the competition.
(LOW) The cook was one of the bottom entries in an individual elimination challenge or pressure test advanced.
(LOW) The cook was one of the bottom entries in the Team Challenge, and they advanced.
(ELIM) The cook was eliminated from MasterChef.

== Episodes ==
| No. overall | No. in season | Title | Original release date | Prod. code | CAN viewers (millions) | Rank (week) |
|---|---|---|---|---|---|---|
| 31 | 1 | "Yes, No, Maybe So" | February 14, 2016 | 301 | 1.229 | 25 |
Forty homecooks are given the opportunity to present their signature dishes for Alvin Leung, Claudio Aprile and Michael Bonacini. However, in a twist on the classic format there are three possible outcomes: three "no" votes eliminate a homecook, while a full three "yes" votes are required in order to obtain a MasterChef Canada apron and a spot in the Top 14; one or two "yes" votes give the homecook a second chance. The episode features the auditions of the Vince, Mary, April Lee, Jeremy, Jennifer and Terry, each of whom win an apron, as well as the auditions of Veronica, Michelle, Matthew and Sean, who are among those given a second chance, and Dru, who is eliminated along with fifteen other cooks.
| 32 | 2 | "A Cut Above" | February 21, 2016 | 302 | 1.427 | 17 |
With Vince, Mary, April Lee, Jeremy, Jennifer and Terry on the balcony, the eighteen homecooks given a second chance are asked to complete as much of a Mise en place in fifteen minutes. After three groups are called forward, Jacqueline, Julia, Matthew and Sean win aprons while the other two groups, including Robin, Alain, Domingo, Ernie, Fanassa and Kendra, were eliminated. The other eight cooks were tasked with making a dish using the same ingredients, with access to a limited pantry. In the end, David, Michelle, Shawn and Veronica round out the Top 14, while Elizabeth, Les, Reno and Travis are sent home.
| 33 | 3 | "At Home and Abroad" | March 6, 2016 | 303 | 1.554 | 14 |
Mystery Box 1: The mystery box contained thirteen iconic Canadian ingredients, one from each province and territory. Shawn, Mary, and Veronica made the three best dishes, and Shawn won. Elimination Test 1: Shawn received immunity from elimination, and given a pick of the judges' heritage cuisines for the next challenge theme; he picked Claudio's South American ingredients for the others to work with in the elimination challenge. For his third advantage, he was able to save two home cooks from elimination; he picked Terry and Vince. At the end of the cook, Matthew and Michelle made the two best dishes. The worst three dishes belonged to Jennifer, David and Veronica, and David was eliminated due to his lack of knowledge of South American cuisine.
| 34 | 4 | "Trial By Fire" | March 13, 2016 | 304 | 1.388 | 15 |
Team Challenge 1: The home cooks were tasked with preparing and serving a baby pork rib entree with two sides and a sauce to 121 firefighters. Matthew and Michelle were the captains of the Red and Blue teams respectively. Matthew got to choose all five members of his team before Michelle. He chose Mary, Sean, Jeremy, Vince and Jacqueline to join him, forming the Red Team. This left Michelle with April Lee, Jennifer, Julia, Shawn, Terry and Veronica, forming the Blue Team. With a difference of 20 votes, the Blue Team won the challenge; part of the challenge loss was blamed on Sean opening the grill lid. Pressure Test 1: In the pressure test, the home cooks on the Red Team had to bake a tower of 24 cupcakes with at least three different flavors. Given the chance to save two members of his team, Matthew saved himself and Jeremy from the pressure test. The towers of Jacqueline and Mary were praised, with Mary's cupcakes being deemed the best, leaving Sean and Vince as the bottom two, and Vince was eliminated to the surprise of his fellow competitors.
| 35 | 5 | "Off the Hook" | March 20, 2016 | 305 | 1.539 | 13 |
Mystery Box 2: The mystery box had the home cooks workings in pairs. The pairs were Mary and Matthew, Jeremy and Jacqueline, Terry and Jennifer, Julia and April Lee, Michelle and Veronica, and Sean and Shawn. Julia and April Lee, Jeremy and Jacqueline, and Terry and Jennifer made the three best dishes, and Terry and Jennifer won. Elimination Test 2: Terry and Jennifer were immune from elimination, and were shown eight different types of fish they then assigned to the other home cooks to cook. They also chose two home cooks to be saved from elimination. Targeting Jeremy, April Lee and Mary, they assigned monkfish to Jeremy, hake to April Lee, steelhead trout to Mary, British Columbia sturgeon to Sean, Spanish mackarel to Jacqueline, sole to Michelle, red mullet to Veronica, and branzino to Matthew, leaving Shawn and Julia to receive immunity. Veronica and Jacqueline made the two best dishes, making them team captains for their next team challenge. Mary and Sean were called out for having the two worst fish dishes, and Sean was eliminated, due to using his fish as a garnish in his dish.
| 36 | 6 | "Feast your eyes" | March 27, 2016 | 306 | 1.332 | 17 |
Team Challenge 2: For their next team challenge, the home cooks were tasked with cooking a three-course lunch for sixteen fashion elites. Each team had to make one vegetarian, one seafood, and one meat dish. Veronica and Jacqueline were the Red and Blue Team captains respectively. Veronica chose Matthew, Michelle, Julia and April Lee, forming the Red team. Jacqueline chose Mary, Jeremy, Shawn and Jennifer, forming the Blue team. The judges gave Terry the option of choosing which team to join, and he chose to join the Red Team. The Blue Team won the challenge. Pressure Test 2: The home cooks on the Red team had 20 minutes to cook a butter-poached lobster dish. Veronica was given the option of saving herself or one of her teammates, and she decided to save Michelle. Matthew, April Lee and Veronica were are all sent to safety, leaving Julia and Terry in the bottom. The judges announced that there would be a second pressure test to determine which of them would be sent home. The second pressure test required Julia and Terry to recreate a dish of steak au poivre in only 15 minutes. Terry was deemed to have performed better and Julia was sent home.
| 37 | 7 | "From the Heart" | April 10, 2016 | 307 | 1.330 | 18 |
Mystery Box 3: The mystery box contained basic ingredients needed to produce a baked dessert, as well as a heart-shaped tin. Veronica, Terry, and Shawn made the three best dishes, and Veronica won, and her recipe was also featured in a Becel advertising campaign. Elimination Test 3: Veronica was safe from elimination. She was allowed to choose four home cooks to cook with the canned version of the theme ingredient instead of fresh, and She gave the canned ingredient to Jeremy, Mary, Jacqueline and April Lee. The special ingredient was revealed to be pumpkin. Shawn made the best dish with Mary and Terry placing second and third respectively. Jennifer, April Lee and Michelle were called out for having the worst three dishes, and Michelle was sent home.
| 38 | 8 | "Oktoberfest Feast" | April 17, 2016 | 308 | 1.343 | 17 |
Team Challenge 3: For their next team challenge, the home cooks arrived at Mississauga's Hansa Haus and had to cook gourmet sausage dishes with a topping and a side for 250 people in celebration of Oktoberfest, and the team with the most sales was safe from elimination. Shawn, Mary and Terry were the captains of the Red, Blue and Green Teams respectively. Shawn chose pork as his protein, while Mary chose lamb, leaving Terry with beef. Shawn chose Jeremy and Jacqueline, forming the Red team, and Mary chose Veronica and Matthew, forming the Blue team, while Terry chose April Lee and was left with Jennifer, forming the Green team. The Green team won the challenge. Pressure Test 3: The judges announced that one member each from the Red and Blue teams could be saved from the pressure test, and that all members from both teams decided be deciding who would be saved. The Red team decided to save Jeremy, while the Blue Team decided to send Veronica to safety. The rest had one hour to prepare freshly made ricotta cheese and then make a ravioli dish and a gnudi dish. Mary made the best dish, leaving Jacqueline, Shawn, and Matthew in the bottom three, and Jacqueline was eliminated.
| 39 | 9 | "Head and Shoulders, Knees and Toes" | April 24, 2016 | 309 | 1.408 | 18 |
Team Challenge 4: The home cooks were split into two teams and had 90 minutes to prepare a four-dish menu each using the heads, shoulders, knees and toes of various animals. In a random draw of selections, the Blue Team consisted of April Lee, Jennifer, Jeremy and Mary, while the Red Team consisted of Matthew, Shawn, Terry and Veronica, and there were no team captains in this challenge. The Red Team decided on an Asian themed menu, while the Blue Team created elevated versions of old favourite recipes. The Red Team was the winner. Pressure Test 4: April Lee, Jennifer, Jeremy and Mary had 90 minutes to bake four éclairs with four different toppings. While none of the contestants were noted to have truly nailed their work, Jeremy and April Lee were deemed to have made the best dishes, leaving Jennifer (whose éclairs were too small, had uninspiring flavours, and had technical errors in the choux-pastry and pastry cream) and Mary (whose pastry had cracked, along with suffering some misfires in her flavour choices) to face elimination, and Jennifer was eliminated.
| 40 | 10 | "Out of This World" | May 1, 2016 | 310 | 1.407 | 15 |
Mystery Box 4: With retired astronaut Chris Hadfield as a special guest, the mystery box challenge tasked the home cooks to make a dish using dehydrated space food in 45 minutes. Matthew, Veronica, and Mary made the three best dishes, and Matthew won the challenge. Elimination Test 4: Matthew decided the teams in the following tag team challenge, in which the home cooks were tasked with replicating an exquisite platter consisting of five different hors d'oeuvres. Targeting Mary, he chose to pair up Mary with Jeremy, and Veronica with April Lee, leaving Shawn and Terry as the final team by default. Mary and Jeremy managed to create the best platter, making them team captains in the following team challenge. Shawn and Terry were in the bottom, in part because Terry had mistakenly put the wrong filling in the ceviche, a rookie mistake overlooked by Shawn. The judges felt that Terry was more at fault for misplacing the ceviche. As a result, Terry was eliminated.
| 41 | 11 | "Demon at the Pass" | May 8, 2016 | 311 | 1.429 | 16 |
Team Challenge 5: The top six home cooks took part in the annual Restaurant Takeover in Eric Chong's restaurant located in Toronto's Chinatown: R&D, co-founded with Alvin. The guests consisted of MasterChef Canada alumni, including season two winner David Jorge. Mary led the Red Team with Veronica and April Lee, while Jeremy led the Blue Team with Matthew and Shawn. The judges decided that the Red Team performed better overall. Pressure Test 5: Jeremy, Matthew, and Shawn had one hour to bake their own version of a Charlotte cake, consisting of a sheet cake base, layered with mousse in the middle topped with a fluid gel coulis with ladyfingers coating the exterior perimeter. Jeremy made the best cake despite lacking in citrus, and he was sent to safety first, leaving both Matthew (whose glaze had seeped through his ladyfingers, spoiling the presentation) and Shawn (whose cakes had technical flaws with the ladyfingers and with the mousse being too soft) to face elimination. The judges decided to save Matthew, and Shawn was sent home.
| 42 | 12 | "Cooking With Cocktails" | May 29, 2016 | 312 | 1.444 | 6 |
Mystery Box 5: The cooks were tasked with to making a dish containing a protein, a starch, vegetables and a purée. Veronica, Matthew, and Mary made the three best dishes, and Matthew won the challenge. Elimination Test 5: Matthew received immunity from elimination. The remaining four home cooks had 90 minutes to make two dishes, one savory and one sweet, using the key ingredients in four classic cocktails. For his second advantage, Matthew assigned one of the cocktails to each home cook. Targeting Mary and Veronica, Matthew assigned Bloody Mary (vodka, chili pepper, and tomato) to Mary, Mint julep (bourbon, mint, and sugar) to Veronica, Piña colada (rum, coconut, and pineapple) to April Lee, and Irish coffee (whiskey, coffee, and cream) to Jeremy. Mary and Jeremy made the two best, dishes leaving April Lee and Veronica in the bottom, and April Lee was sent home.
| 43 | 13 | "Meals and Wheels" | June 5, 2016 | 313 | 1.416 | 4 |
Individual Challenge: The final four remaining quarterfinalists were surprised in the kitchen by their families, who joined them for a trip to Toronto's St. Lawrence Market where they purchased they ingredients they would be cooking with. The judges declared Mary's dish the best of the challenge, and she automatically advanced to the Top 3 semi-finals. Pressure Test 6: After bidding goodbyes to their families, Jeremy, Matthew and Veronica donned on their black aprons to face their next pressure test. They were tasked with replicating three sea scallop dishes: a trio of scallops served with pea pureé, a Coquilles Saint-Jacques and a raw scallop crudo. They also had to open the sea scallops straight from the shell, and were given only 7 sea scallops to complete the dishes. Jeremy was noted by Claudio to have "absolutely crushed this challenge", with all three dishes earning rave reviews, and was consequently sent to safety first. This left Matthew and Veronica in the bottom with both having various flaws across the board, and Veronica was sent home.
| 44 | 14 | "Only the Best" | June 12, 2016 | 314 | 1.450 | 4 |
Mystery Box 6: In the semifinals, the 3 semifinalists had 90 minutes to prepare sixteen plates of an entrée for the judges and thirteen of Canada's most influential professional chefs/restaurateurs. The ingredients were the exact same Canadian ingredients from the first Mystery Box challenge. The winner of the penultimate challenge directly advanced to the finale, and the remaining two semifinalists went head-to-head in the final pressure test of the season. Mary won the challenge, winning her a spot in the finale. Pressure Test 7: Jeremy and Matthew went head-to-head in the last pressure test of the season. The theme was citrus-infused desserts, and Jeremy and Matthew had 90 minutes to replicate three very technically challenging citrus desserts: white chocolate ganache with grapefruit pound loaf cake croutons, grapefruit jelly cubes and mint ice cream, lime mousse-filled choux covered with coconut sablé, and matcha tart filled with yuzu and lemon curd with browned meringue sesame snaps, finger limes and gold leaves. With neither of them having a complete home-run performance across all three dishes, the judges decided that Jeremy's dishes narrowly edged out Matthew's when it came to flavor and execution, advancing Jeremy to join Mary in the finale, resulting in Matthew's elimination.
| 45 | 15 | "Season 3 Finale" | June 19, 2016 | 315 | 1.506 | 2 |
Mary and Jeremy competed in a three-course challenge in the finale to determine the winner. For appetizer, Mary made a golden beet borscht with horseradish goat cheese mousse, beet-cured trout, and caraway crumb, while Jeremy made bison tataki with uni cream, lotus chips, and tataki sauce. For entrée, Jeremy served a sushi boat consisting of a deconstructed spider roll with soft shell crab, marinated baby octopus with mushrooms, tuna crunch roll with wasabi mayo and crispy salmon skin, and ginger papaya salad, while Mary served a surf and turf with beef tenderloin, fried oysters, and arugula and sea asparagus pesto. For dessert, Jeremy made a milk tea panna cotta with coconut tapioca, fried plantains, and jackfruit ice cream, while Mary made a blueberry financier with brown butter crumb, kettle corn, blueberry sauce, and buttermilk corn ice cream. Mary won, becoming the first female and vegetarian winner of MasterChef Canada.
