= Wonder Why =

Wonder Why can refer to:

- Wonder Why (song), 1951 song by Sammy Cahn and Nicholas Brodszky
- Wonder Why?, Canadian educational TV program, 1990-1994
