= Walter Baker (Canadian politician) =

Canadian politician and lawyer

The Honourable Walter David Baker PC QC

Member of the Canadian Parliament for Nepean—Carleton Grenville—Carleton (1972-1979)
- In office October 30, 1972 – November 13, 1983
- Preceded by: Gordon Blair
- Succeeded by: William Tupper

Personal details
- Born: August 22, 1930 Ottawa, Ontario, Canada
- Died: November 13, 1983 (aged 53) Ottawa, Ontario, Canada
- Party: Progressive Conservative
- Education: Carleton University; University of Toronto (Law)
- Occupation: Lawyer

Walter David Baker, PC (August 22, 1930 – November 13, 1983) was a Canadian parliamentarian and lawyer.

Baker is best known for having been Government House Leader during the short-lived minority government of Joe Clark. He received much of the popular blame for the defeat of the government in a Motion of no confidence on December 13, 1979 with the claim that the government fell because "Walter Baker couldn't count". However, observers pointed out that targeting Baker as the scapegoat was unfair as he was House Leader, not Party Whip. The defeat was the result of the Clark government's decision to alienate the six Social Credit Members of Parliament by refusing to accord them official party status as well as Clark's view that he could "govern as if" he had a majority government.

Baker was first elected to the House of Commons of Canada in the 1972 election as the Progressive Conservative Member of Parliament for Grenville—Carleton (later renamed Nepean—Carleton) and was re-elected in the 1974, 1979 and 1980 elections. He served as both Government House Leader and Minister of National Revenue during the Clark government. He served as Opposition House Leader from 1976 to 1979 and again from 1980 to 1981.

In government, Baker introduced the first ever Access to Information Bill which died on the order paper with the Tory government. However, much of Baker's bill became part of the eventual Access to Information Act that was introduced by Liberal Solicitor-General Francis Fox in 1983 and passed by parliament into law.

He was one of the founding partners of the law firm Bell Baker LLP located in Ottawa, Ontario.

Baker died at the age of 53. A week after his death, a recreational centre in Barrhaven, Ottawa, Ontario was named after him, the South Nepean Centre became the Walter Baker Sports Centre.

== Electoral record ==
1980 Canadian federal election
Party	Candidate	Votes	%	±%
Progressive Conservative	Walter Baker	31,498	53.5	-6.0
Liberal	Gord Hunter	19,482	33.1	+5.4
New Democratic	Alan White	7,187	12.2	-0.5
Rhinoceros	Alan Cockerell	658	1.1	
Total valid votes		58,825	100.0	

1979 Canadian federal election
Party	Candidate	Votes	%
Progressive Conservative	Walter Baker	36,717	59.6
Liberal	Bluma Appel	17,108	27.8
New Democratic	Marnie Girvan	7,810	12.7
Total valid votes		61,635	100.0

Parliament of Canada
Preceded by Gordon Blair	Member of Parliament for Grenville—Carleton; 1972–1979	Succeeded by The electoral district was abolished in 1976.
Preceded by The electoral district was created in 1976.	Member of Parliament for Nepean—Carleton; 1979–1983	Succeeded by William Tupper
