= David Pratt (politician) =

Canadian politician (born 1955)

The Honourable David Pratt PC
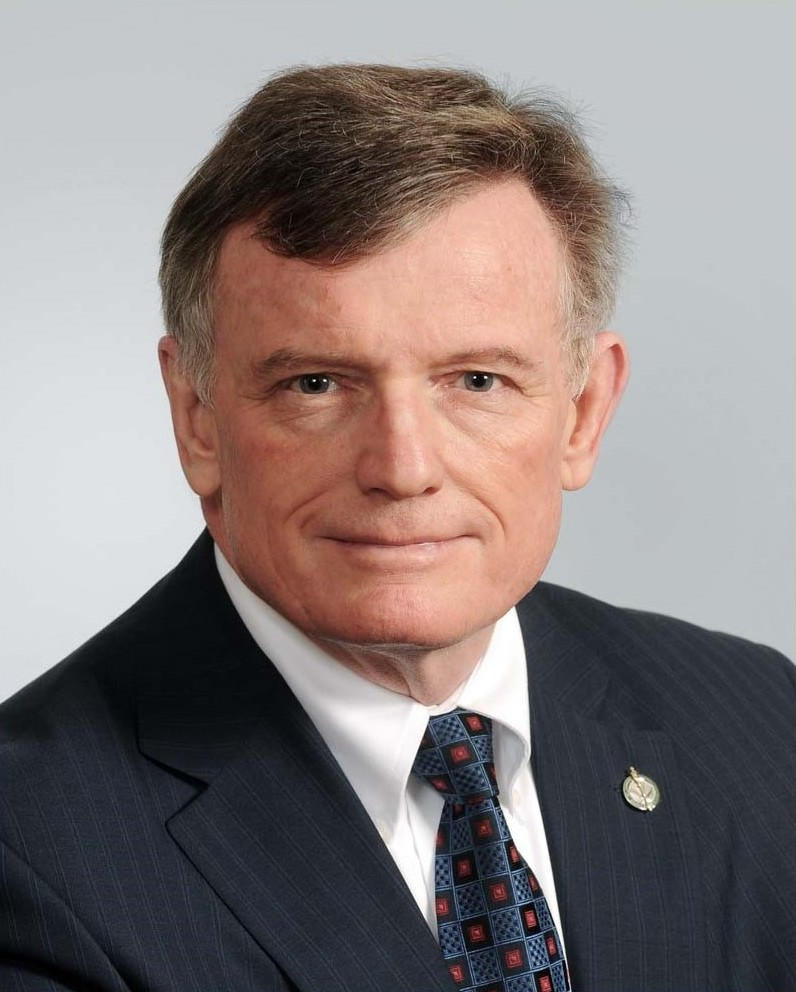

Minister of National Defense
- In office 12 December 2003 – 19 July 2004
- Prime Minister: Paul Martin
- Preceded by: John McCallum
- Succeeded by: Bill Graham

Member of Parliament for Nepean—Carleton
- In office 2 June 1997 – 28 June 2004
- Preceded by: Riding established
- Succeeded by: Pierre Poilievre

Personal details
- Born: 3 January 1955 (age 71) Ottawa, Ontario, Canada
- Party: Liberal (1997–2008)
- Profession: Consultant

David Pratt PC (born 3 January 1955) is a former Canadian politician. He was the Member of Parliament for Nepean—Carleton from 1997 until 2004.

== Early political career ==
Before Pratt was elected federally, he served in public office municipally. In 1988, he won a seat on Nepean City Council. His re-election in 1991 also gave him a seat on the Ottawa-Carleton Regional Municipality Council. In the municipal election of 1994, his candidacy was uncontested and he was acclaimed. On Nepean Council, Pratt served a term as Deputy Mayor and chaired the committees of Public Works and Parks and Recreation. On Regional Council, he worked on transportation and environment issues and was a member of the Ottawa-Carleton Police Services Board and the OC Transpo Commission. He served for five years on the board of directors of the Federation of Canadian Municipalities where he was involved in community safety and crime prevention issues, district energy and international development programs in Africa.

== National politics ==
As Minister of National Defence, Pratt received cabinet support for several major procurement projects totalling $7 billion including the Maritime Helicopter Program (Sikorsky CH-148 Cyclone) to replace the aging Sikorsky CH-124 Sea King fleet, the M1128 mobile gun system (later cancelled) and a new fixed wing search and rescue aircraft to replace the CH-115 and C-130H Hercules (CC-295). He also obtained federal cabinet approval for the Joint Support Ship program to provide new supply ships for the Canadian Navy. As the local Ottawa cabinet minister in 2004, he worked with provincial and municipal officials to assemble $600 million in funding for a proposed light rail transit system (LRT) Following the election in 2006 of a new Ottawa Mayor, Larry O’Brien, who replaced Mayor Bob Chiarelli, and with the support of the local Conservative Cabinet Minister, John Baird, the transit project was cancelled by the City of Ottawa. Long delays in planning and construction meant that the first section of the LRT system was only opened in 2019.

As Chair of the Commons Defence Committee, he was a strong advocate for increased military spending both before and after the September 11 attacks in the United States in 2001. Under his leadership, the defence committee released a report entitled: "Facing Our Responsibilities: The state of readiness of the Canadian Forces" which called for substantial new investments in Canada's military capabilities. As committee chair, Pratt also argued strongly for a more bi-partisan approach to defence issues and for regular reviews of Canadian foreign and defence policy. He successfully sponsored a resolution in Parliament to declare the first Sunday in June "Canadian Forces Day" and contributed to policy debates on defence and security matters with two papers: "Fostering Human Security: A Joint Canada-US Brigade," (October 2000) and "Does Canada Need A Foreign Intelligence Agency?" (March 2003).

In 1999, Pratt served as a Special Envoy for Lloyd Axworthy, Minister of Foreign Affairs to Sierra Leone and performed the same role for Axworthy's successor, John Manley. He visited the war torn country on several occasions. He met and held talks with the former Sierra Leonean President Ahmed Tejan Kabbah, and former President Charles Taylor of Liberia, President Lansana Conte of Guinea. There were also meetings and consultations with other senior officials and diplomatic representatives including Revolutionary United Front leader Foday Sankoh. He wrote two reports - "The Forgotten Crisis" (April 1999) and "Sierra Leone: Danger and Opportunity in a Regional Conflict" (July 2001). His recommendations called for more Canadian aid to Sierra Leone and more direct Canadian involvement to bring peace to the region. He also suggested that Liberian President Charles Taylor be investigated by the Special Court for Sierra Leone for war crimes and crimes against humanity for his role in prolonging the regional conflict. Pratt also introduced the first legislation in Canada to certify diamonds under the United Nations sanctioned Kimberley Process to stop the trade in blood diamonds and to protect the integrity of the Canadian diamond industry. Similar government sponsored legislation was eventually passed by Parliament.

An advocate of physical fitness, in July 2003, he completed the gruelling four-day 160 kilometre International Four Days Marches Nijmegen with members of the Canadian Forces – the first Canadian Member of Parliament to do so. In the 2004 federal election, he lost his seat to Conservative Party of Canada candidate Pierre Poilievre, forcing his departure as Defence Minister three weeks later.

== Career after politics ==
Following his electoral loss, Pratt joined the Canadian Red Cross as a Special Advisor in November 2004. He worked on issues related to conflict prevention, small arms and light weapons and international humanitarian law. During the aftermath of the December 2004 South East Asia Tsunami, he visited Thailand and Sri Lanka where, with the cooperation of the International Committee of the Red Cross (ICRC), he submitted a report to the Canadian Red Cross with recommendations for Canadian aid. In 2006, he helped initiate the Canadian Red Cross's Auxiliary to Government project. The project sought to improve the cooperation between the Canadian Red Cross and governments at all levels in Canada, especially in the area of emergency management. It emphasized the special and distinct role that Red Cross and Red Crescent Societies have under domestic and international law and the Statutes of the International Red Cross and Red Crescent Movement. The project also sought to obtain new legislation to replace the outdated The Canadian Red Cross Society Act, 1909. As the project leader, Pratt authored a discussion paper entitled: "Toward a Renewed Canadian Red Cross – Forging Stronger Partnerships In Support of a Humanitarian Agenda" and the project's interim report entitled: "Revitalizing the Framework of Cooperation with Public Authorities".

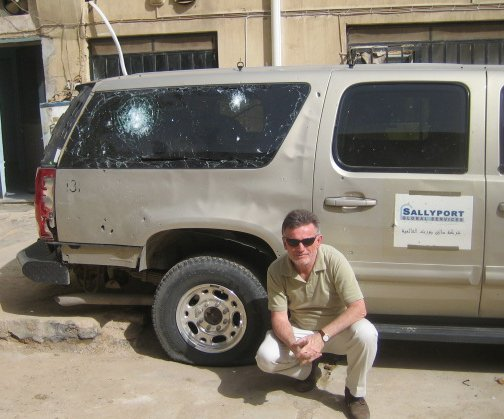
Pratt beside the vehicle that was part of a convoy he was riding in shortly after it was hit by an IED - Baghdad, August 2009

In July 2008, Pratt left the Canadian Red Cross and ran as the Liberal candidate in the riding of Ottawa West—Nepean where he faced incumbent minister John Baird. He received 20,161 votes or 36.1 percent compared to Baird's 25,109 votes and 44.9 percent of the vote. Following the election, Pratt worked as a consultant. In 2009 and 2010, he spent over five months in Baghdad, Iraq employed by AECOM on the USAID sponsored Iraq Legislative Strengthening Program. Pratt was responsible for organizing an orientation and training program for newly elected Iraqi MPs. He also provided teaching material on legislative committees, the concept of parliamentary privilege and codes of ethics for parliamentarians. In August 2009, a three vehicle convoy in which Pratt and four other colleagues were travelling was hit by an IED. The explosion, which occurred in the Red Zone in Baghdad, caused significant vehicle damage and blew out windows in the surrounding area, but no one was hurt.

In January 2011, Pratt accepted the position of Senior Vice President of Public Affairs with GCI Canada, a public affairs company with offices in Toronto and Ottawa. In September 2012, Pratt started his own company, David Pratt & Associates, which is a government relations and strategic consulting firm based in Ottawa. His clients are predominantly defence and security companies interested in procurement opportunities with the Government of Canada. They have included major international defence companies such as Raytheon, Nexter, Leonardo, L3 Harris and Oshkosh Defense as well as cybersecurity and IT companies - large and small.

Pratt served as a Senior Fellow of the Canadian Defence and Foreign Affairs Institute. He is also an honorary member of the Royal Military College of Canada. He has served on the board of directors of Serenity House, a residential substance abuse treatment centre in Ottawa. In October 2014, Pratt was inducted into the Order of St George, the Canadian priory, which traces its roots back to King Kàroly Robert of Hungary in 1326. Since 2014, Pratt has served as the Honorary Consul in Ottawa for the Government of Sierra Leone.

He has authored several papers and delivered notable lectures, beginning with “Re-tooling for New Challenges: Parliaments as Peace-builders” (June 2005), followed by “Is There a Grand Strategy in Canadian Foreign Policy?” presented at the Ross Ellis Lectures, Centre for Military and Strategic Studies, University of Calgary (June 2007), and “Canadian Grand Strategy and Lessons Learned” (April 2008). He later authored “Canada’s Citizen Soldiers: A Discussion Paper” (March 2011) for the Canadian Defence and Foreign Affairs Institute. In October 2018, he spoke at the Oxford Union debate in favour of the proposition “The War on Terror has been its own worst enemy”, and most recently authored “Is History Rhyming? The Putin–Hitler Analogy, Ukraine and Euro-Atlantic Security” (1 July 2024).

== Electoral record ==
2004 Canadian federal election
Party	Candidate	Votes	%	±%
Conservative	Pierre Poilievre	30,420	45.7	-7.7
Liberal	David Pratt	26,684	40.1	-1.1
New Democratic	Phil Brown	6,072	9.1	+5.4
Green	Chris Walker	2,886	4.3	+3.0
Marijuana	Brad Powers	561	0.8	
Total valid votes		66,623	100.0	

2000 Canadian federal election
Party	Candidate	Votes	%	±%
Liberal	David Pratt	24,570	41.2	-7.6
Alliance	Michael Green	22,310	37.4	+11.0
Progressive Conservative	Bill Knott	9,536	16.0	-3.1
New Democratic	Craig Parsons	2,223	3.7	-1.1
Green	Isobel McGregor	805	1.3	
Canadian Action	Jack Waisvisz	131	0.2	-0.3
Natural Law	Lester Newby	118	0.2	-0.2
Total valid votes		59,693	100.0	

1997 Canadian federal election
Party	Candidate	Votes	%
Liberal	David Pratt	28,366	48.8
Reform	Paul Fitzgerald	15,333	26.4
Progressive Conservative	Betty Hill	11,072	19.0
New Democratic	Cathy Martin	2,788	4.8
Canadian Action	Terrence Bell	331	0.6
Natural Law	Brian Jackson	238	0.4
Total valid votes		58,128	100.0

Parliament of Canada
Preceded by William Tupper	Member of Parliament for Nepean—Carleton; 1997–2004	Succeeded by Pierre Poilievre
Cabinet posts
Preceded by John McCallum	Minister of National Defence; 2003–2004	Succeeded by Bill Graham
