= Grenville—Carleton (federal electoral district) =

Former federal electoral district in Ontario, Canada

Ontario electoral district

Defunct federal electoral district
- Legislature: House of Commons
- District created: 1966
- District abolished: 1976
- First contested: 1968
- Last contested: 1974

Grenville–Carleton was a federal electoral district in Ontario, represented in the House of Commons of Canada from 1968 to 1979. It was created in 1966 from portions of the former Carleton and Grenville—Dundas ridings.

It consisted of:

- The part of the City of Ottawa lying south of Baseline Road and west of Fisher Avenue;
- the Townships of Goulbourn, Marlborough, Nepean, North Gower and Osgoode, as well as Long Island (in the Township of Gloucester) in the County of Carleton;
- the County of Grenville, including the Village of Merrickville, and
- the Townships of Matilda and Mountain in the County of Dundas.

The electoral district was abolished in 1976 when it was redistributed between Leeds—Grenville, Nepean—Carleton, Ottawa Centre, Ottawa West—Nepean and Stormont—Dundas ridings.

== Members of Parliament ==
This riding has elected the following members of Parliament:

Parliament	Years	Member	Party
Riding created from Carleton and Grenville—Dundas
28th	1968–1972	Gordon Blair	Liberal
29th	1972–1974	Walter Baker	Progressive Conservative
30th	1974–1979	Walter Baker	Progressive Conservative
Riding dissolved into Leeds—Grenville, Nepean—Carleton, Ottawa Centre, Ottawa West—Nepean and Stormont—Dundas

== Election results ==
1968 Canadian federal election
Party	Candidate	Votes	%
Liberal	Gordon Blair	21,250	48.0
Progressive Conservative	Jean Casselman Wadds	18,843	43.0
New Democratic	David Bell	3,887	9.0
Total valid votes		43,980	
Source: Elections Canada and Canada Elections Database

1972 Canadian federal election
Party	Candidate	Votes	%	±%
Progressive Conservative	Walter Baker	32,689	53.5	+15.5
Liberal	Gordon Blair	22,026	36.0	-12.0
New Democratic	Joan Kabayama	6,405	10.5	+1.5
Total valid votes		61,120		
Turnout (based on valid votes; total votes not available)		61,120	83.5	
Eligible voters		73,193		
Source: Elections Canada and Canada Elections Database

1974 Canadian federal election
Party	Candidate	Votes	%	±%
Progressive Conservative	Walter Baker	33,946	54.4	+0.9
Liberal	Jim McDonald	22,803	36.5	+0.5
New Democratic	Joan Kabayama	5,679	9.1	-1.4
Total valid votes		62,428		
Total rejected ballots		192		
Turnout		62,620	78.4	-5.1
Eligible voters		79,873		
Source: Elections Canada and Canada Elections Database

== See also ==
- List of Canadian electoral districts
- Historical federal electoral districts of Canada
