= Bluma Appel =

Canadian philanthropist

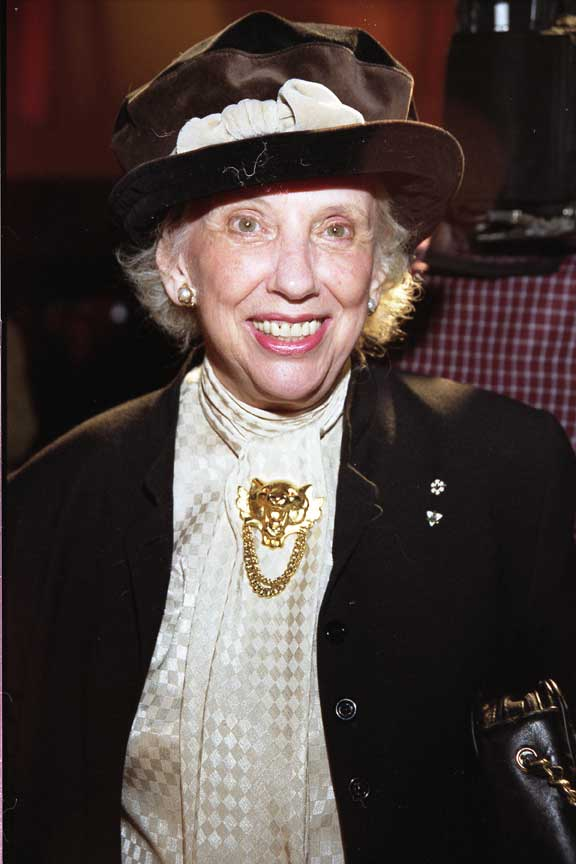
- Appel in December 2000
- Born: September 4, 1919; Montreal, Quebec, Canada
- Died: July 15, 2007 (aged 87); Toronto, Ontario, Canada
- Occupations: Philanthropist, arts patron

Bluma Appel, OC OOnt (September 4, 1919 – July 15, 2007) was a Canadian Jewish philanthropist and patron of the arts.

== Life ==
She was born the daughter of Russian-Jewish émigrés who left Czarist Russia around 1905. Born and raised in Montreal, Quebec, she was the founder of CANFAR, the Canadian Foundation for AIDS Research. Bluma married the Montreal chartered accountant Bram (Abraham) Appel on July 11, 1940. It was Bram's subsequent success in business which afforded her the opportunity to engage in serious philanthropic activity. In 1946, he co-founded Pall Corporation.

In 1979, she ran unsuccessfully as a Liberal candidate for the House of Commons of Canada in the riding of Nepean—Carleton. She lost to Walter Baker.

She was a major supporter of the St. Lawrence Centre for the Arts, which named one of its theatres in her honour in March 1983 after she made a donation to help renovate the 876-seat theatre where the Canadian Stage Company (CanStage) performs. She was also a significant force behind Opera Atelier. In June 2005, the Toronto Alliance for the Performing Arts gave Ms. Appel an honorary Dora Mavor Moore Award "for her exceptional and lifelong dedication" to the performing arts in Canada. She is memorialized at The Canadian Stage Company's Bluma Appel Theatre in perpetuity.

Four days after celebrating her 67th wedding anniversary, Appel died of lung cancer in a hospital in Toronto, following a brief illness, aged 87. She was buried at Pardes Shalom Cemetery, north of Toronto. Bram Appel died October 8, 2007. They are survived by their sons David (born 1941) and Mark (born 1944), and five grandchildren.

== Honours and awards ==
- In 1988, she was made a Member of the Order of Canada for being one of a few people "as active in such a broad range of community services as she".
- In 1998, she was awarded an Order of Ontario.
- In 2001, she was elevated to Officer of the Order of Canada for continuing "her outstanding volunteer work on behalf of numerous cultural, social and health care organizations".
- In 2005, she was awarded an honorary Dora Mavor Moore Award for her lifelong support of Canadian arts and culture, an honour given to only two other individuals, William Hutt and Urjo Kareda.
- In 2006, she was awarded an honorary Doctor of Laws degree from the University of Toronto.
- In 2007, she was awarded an honorary Doctor of Laws degree from Brock University.
- The Bluma Appel Theatre in the St. Lawrence Centre for the Arts in Toronto is named in her honour for the use of The Canadian Stage Company
