= Mary's Kitchen Crush =

- Genre: Cookery
- Country of origin: Canada
- Original language: English
- No. of seasons: 1
- No. of episodes: 30

Production
- Camera setup: Multi-camera

Original release
- Network: CTV (primary); CTV 2, CTV Life (secondary)
- Release: April 28, 2019

Related
- Mary's Big Kitchen Party; Mary Makes It Easy

Mary's Kitchen Crush is a Canadian cooking television series, which premiered on CTV on April 28, 2019. Hosted by Mary Berg, the third season winner of MasterChef Canada, the half-hour weekly series features Berg preparing her own original recipes inspired by her family and friends, which she then serves at the end of the episode as a private personal dinner for the person who inspired the recipe.

The first 10 episodes aired from April 28, 2019 to July 7, 2019. Another set of 10 episodes aired from March 22, 2020 to May 31, 2020. Following these airings and five specials, the series concluded with five episodes from August 9, 2020 to September 6, 2020, as the first half of the network's cooking hour alongside Double Your Dish. Special episodes include a Thanksgiving special in 2019, a double feature for the 2019 Christmas season, an "Appy To Be Nominated" special on the eve of the 92nd Academy Awards (which also aired on CTV in Canada), and a "Muscle Meal" episode on March 20, 2020.

The series has aired internationally, including on Tastemade in the United States and Lifestyle Food in Australia.

The series won two Canadian Screen Awards at the 8th Canadian Screen Awards in 2020, for Best Lifestyle Series and Best Host in a Lifestyle Series. Mary's Kitchen Crush won Best Lifestyle Program or Series at the 9th Canadian Screen Awards and Berg won for Best Lifestyle Host.

In 2021, Berg launched the new series Mary Makes It Easy on CTV Life Channel in Canada and on Food Network in the United States.
