= Valerie Pringle Has Left the Building =

Valerie Pringle Has Left The Building is a travel program hosted by Valerie Pringle and produced by CTV. There were thirty one episodes.

== Episodes and airdates ==
Episode #	Region	Airdate
1	Hong Kong	2002
2	Istanbul	2002
3	Chiang Mai	2002
4	Grand Canyon	2002
5	Uruguay	2002
6	Singapore	2002
7	Lake Como	2002
8	Bangkok	2002
9	Bali	2002
10	Telluride	2002
11	Morocco	2003
12	Berlin	2003
13	Australia	2003
14	Lebanon	2003
15	Dublin	2003
16	Dubrovnik	2003
17	Cook Islands	2003
18	Panama	2003
19	Ireland	2003
20	Australian Outback	2003
21	Mount Everest	2004
22	Yellowknife	2004
23	Newfoundland	2005
24	New Zealand (Maori)	2005
25	New Zealand (Tourism Destinations)	2005
26	Whistler, British Columbia	2005
27	Southern Alberta	2005
28	Igloolik	2005
29	Queen Charlotte Islands	2005
30	Saskatchewan	2006
31	Cape Breton	2006

== See also ==
- List of programs broadcast by CTV
