= Canadian Foundation for AIDS Research =

Canadian medical research organization

Canadian Foundation for AIDS Research (CANFAR)
- Foundation canadienne de recherche sur le sida (CANFAR)
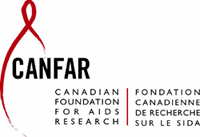
- Formation: October 26, 1987; 38 years ago
- Type: Not-for-Profit Corporation
- Legal status: Active
- Purpose: HIV/AIDS Awareness and Research
- Headquarters: 2200 Yonge Street; Suite 1600; Toronto, Ontario; M4S 2C6
- Region served: Canada
- Official languages: English; French
- Chief Executive Officer: Alex Filiatrault
- Revenue: $2,985,786 (2022)
- Website: www.canfar.com

The Canadian Foundation for AIDS Research (CANFAR) is the only national charitable foundation that raises awareness to generate funds for research into all aspects of HIV infection and AIDS. Since inception in 1987, CANFAR has invested more than $26 million in research initiatives across Canada, and supported close to 575 distinct research initiatives. CANFAR is funded solely through the generosity of corporations, groups, and individuals across Canada.

Each year it is the responsibility of CANFAR's Scientific Advisory Committee (SAC) to evaluate which research proposals seem most promising and likely to make a worthwhile contribution to the international body of HIV and AIDS research. CANFAR is dedicated to funding all aspects of research, including: fundamental and applied research; educational and prevention; care; psychosocial initiatives; and community research.

== History ==
Canadian Foundation for AIDS Research (CANFAR) was created in 1987 by four friends (Dinah Koo, Van Beltreme, Jack Creed and Robert Mang) in an effort to support HIV/AIDS research that would lead to a cure since Canada's emerging HIV/AIDS organizations primarily dealt with the, just as significant, need to care and support people living with the disease. Canada has not faced a great number of AIDS cases in comparison to its neighbour country, the United States.

Three doctors and scientists, Dr. Mary Fanning, Dr. Michael Baker and Dr. Norbert Gilmore were brought on board to scientifically determine which research projects were most promising and deserving of funding.

CANFAR was incorporated in 1987. Cornelia Molson was Founding President and Robert Ross became the charity's founding executive director.

In 1988, CANFAR held the first Food for Thought gala dinner, raising over $150,000 for HIV/AIDS research. This event has grown and changed over the years, but is an integral part of CANFAR's fundraising efforts.

Prominent philanthropist Bluma Appel joined CANFAR's Planning Committee, later becoming a creator of a Board of Advisors and a Junior Committee, as well as acting as chair of the executive committee until her death in 2007.

In 1989, the Scientific Advisory Committee (SAC) was organized to identify the most promising HIV/AIDS research projects and providing them funding. Gilmore headed up this group and in 1989, CANFAR announced its first seventeen grant recipients. That year, CANFAR gave $184,445 to HIV/AIDS research projects across Canada.

CANFAR continued to grow its funding capabilities with its Outreach to Industries campaign, securing the support of both the banking and insurance industries. The new support enabled CANFAR to grant its first Canadian Industry Research Award (CIRA) to Dr. Tak Mak in the amount of $100,000. With to the renewed support of major supporters, CANFAR awarded a second CIRA to Dr. Frank Plummer in 1994.

== Research ==
=== Funding Research ===
CANFAR supports research in four main areas of study; basic science, epidemiology, clinical studies, and psycho-social studies. Grants are awarded in two categories; one-year grants up to $25,000 and under or two-year grants up to $80,000 per year.

A peer-review process determines which studies are funded. Each proposal is reviewed and graded by at least three other scholars in the HIV/AIDS field. Proposals are judged on scientific merit; relevance of the research; the qualifications, experience and productivity of the researcher; the uniqueness of the project within the Canadian and global context; and the facilities available to undertake the proposed research. Once graded, the Scientific Advisory Committee (SAC) decides which studies deserve funding.

The SAC uses the grades and comments of the reviewers along with their own knowledge of the studies to make their decisions. The proposals are then ranked with a cut off point beyond which the SAC does not recommend funding. From there the Board of Directors meets to approve the SAC selections as to which proposals will be funded based on the rankings by the SAC and the funds available. Since 1987 CANFAR has reviewed close to over 1000 proposals, funded well over three hundred studies across ten provinces, and directed over $15 million towards HIV/AIDS research.

Within the HIV/AIDS funding landscape in Canada, there are currently only three organizations devoted to research and two of those are funded by the federal and provincial levels of government respectively. As well as CANFAR there is the Canadian Institutes of Health Research (CIHR) and the Ontario HIV/AIDS Treatment Network (OHTN). Over the course of its history, CANFAR has worked towards increasing the amount and number of the grants that it supports. In its first year CANFAR awarded five grants totalling almost $60,000. CANFAR now consistently funds more than fifteen research studies and collaborations exceeding $750,000.

=== CANFAR-funded breakthroughs ===
Dr. Sadhna Joshi and research team

Dr. Sadhna Joshi at the University of Toronto is working to discover ways to combat HIV through gene therapy. In her research, Joshi targets both the cells that are infected by HIV, and the virus itself. Dr. Joshi is experimenting with ways to prevent infection by removing receptors that HIV uses to enter immune cells. She is also targeting genes in HIV to prevent replication after infection.

Dr. Clifford Lingwood from The Hospital for Sick Children and Dr. Donald Branch from Canadian Blood Services have identified a new resistance factor in the battle against HIV. They discovered that immune cells from individuals who have a certain rare blood type called blood group antigen Pk, also have a drastically reduced sensitivity to HIV infection. This factor protects cells from infection, indicating that it may have therapeutic potential.

Dr. Deborah Money's research at the Children's and Women's Health Centre of British Columbia has provided new insights to guide the safe use of antiretroviral therapy during pregnancy. Money studies the risks of toxicity and health outcomes in both mothers and uninfected children following antiretroviral therapy.

Dr. Frank Plummer from the University of Manitoba is studying a small group of Nairobi prostitutes to discover the source of their natural resistance to HIV infection. He has discovered that HIV resistant women have higher levels of a protein called elafin/trappin-2 that helps to confer immunity. Plummer was named Canada's Health Researcher of the Year in 2007 for his work on HIV/AIDS.

Dr. Mark Wainberg was a CANFAR funded researcher and Director of the McGill University AIDS Centre, who discovered a critical component in the highly effective "AIDS cocktail". This major breakthrough led to a dramatic fall in AIDS deaths and has improved the lives of people living with HIV/AIDS since the mid-1990s. Wainberg continued to make discoveries at the forefront of HIV/AIDS research with a focus on anti-viral drugs, understanding drug resistance, and gene therapy, until his death in 2017. For his seminal contributions in the field, Wainberg was made an Officer of the Order of Canada and a Chevalier de Légion d'honneur - the highest honours of Canada and France.

== Events ==
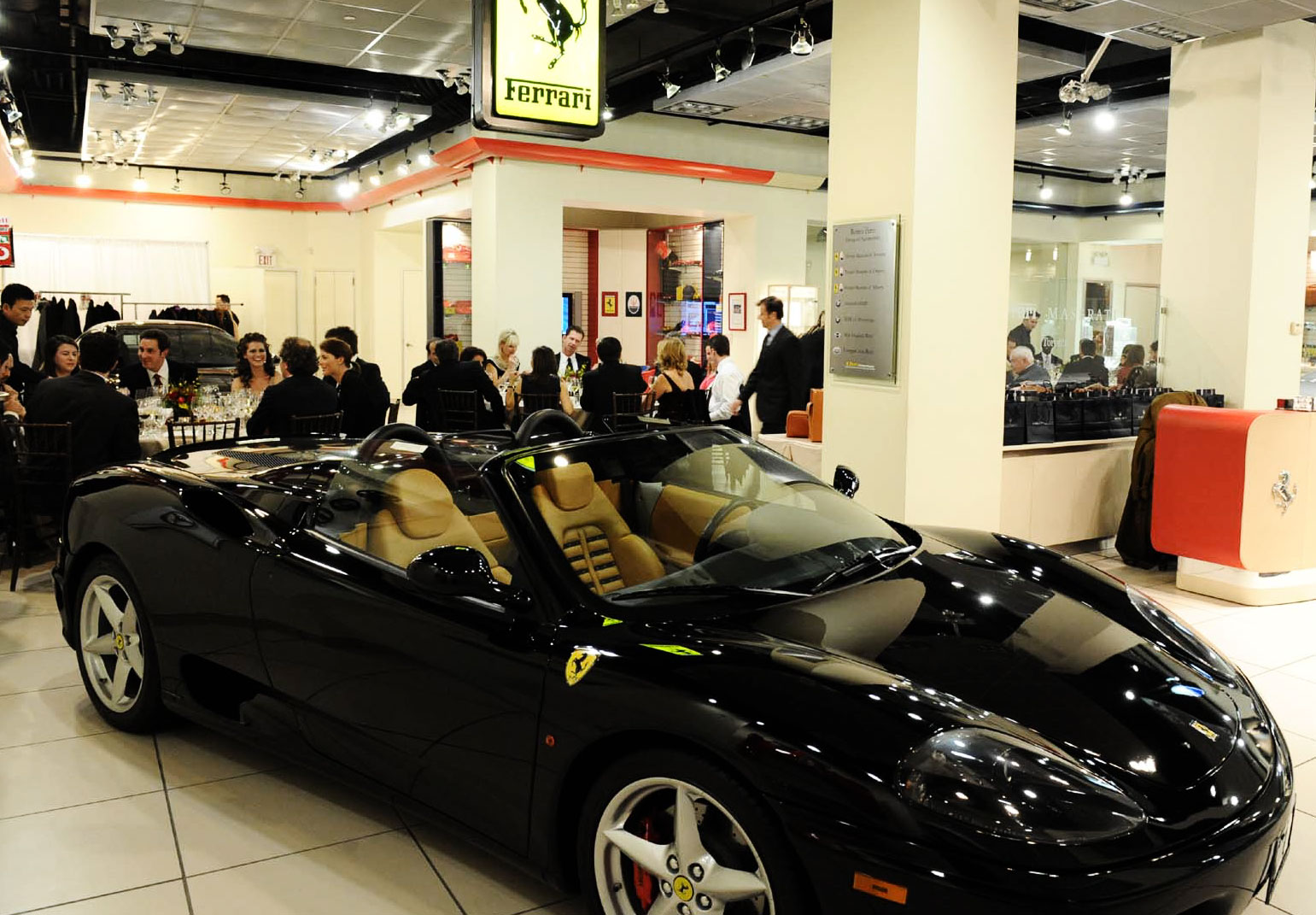
Bloor Street Entertains guests dining at Ferrari Maserati

=== Bloor Street Entertains ===
On September 29, 1988, CANFAR hosted the first Food for Thought, and raised more than $150,000 to support HIV and AIDS research.

In 1993, Food for Thought was renamed the World AIDS Day Gala and moved from the fall to coincide with World AIDS Day on December 1.

In 1997 the event was renamed Bloor Street Entertains. The annual event now raises more than $800,000 each year, and is CANFAR's largest fundraising vehicle.

=== AIDSbeat ===
In 1994, Patricia Olasker organized a CANFAR fundraising event for lawyers which featured breakfast and amateur bands.

Officially named AIDSbeat in 1996, the event raised $20,000 for HIV/AIDS research.

As of 2008, attendance exceeds 800 people each year and raises over $200,000 for CANFAR and HIV/AIDS research.

== Campaigns ==
=== Have a Heart for CANFAR ===
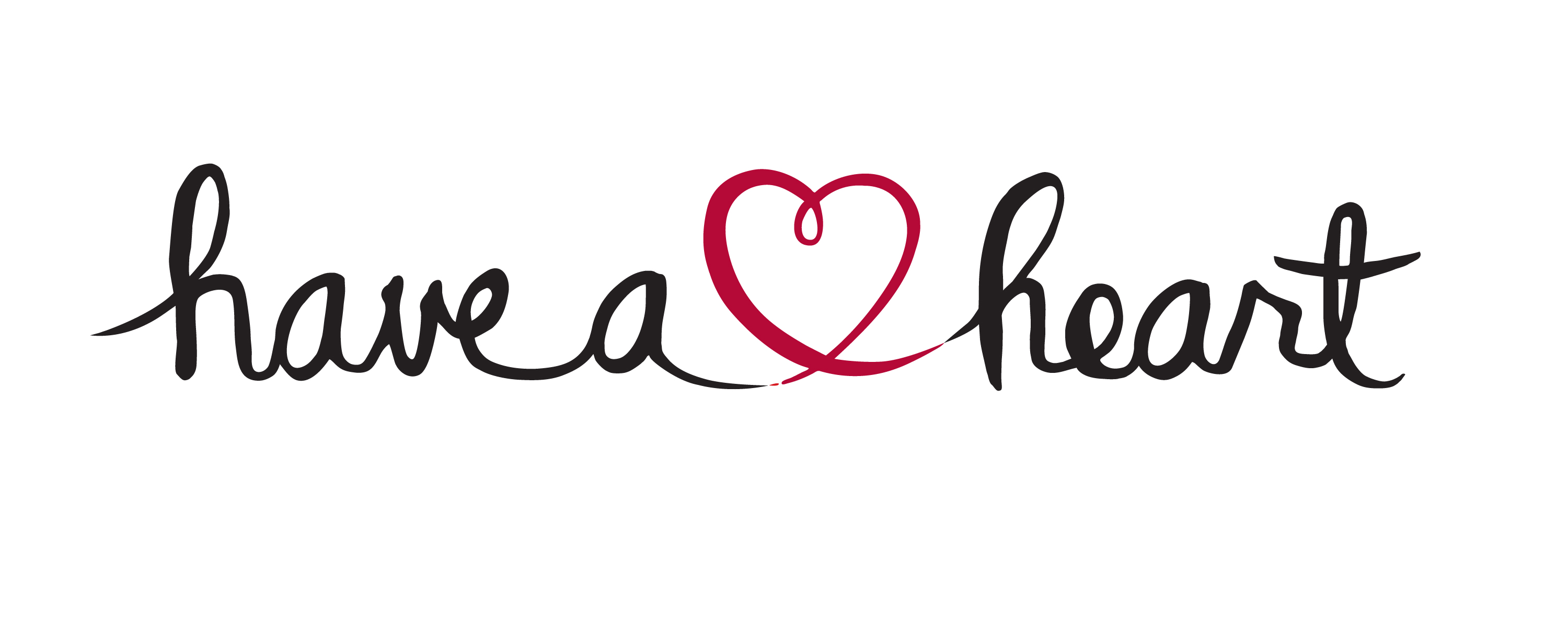
Have a Heart logo

In 1993, Have a Heart for CANFAR was organized at Northern Secondary School in Toronto. Students sold candy-grams of cinnamon hearts with red ribbons to each other near Valentine's Day. Approximately $560 was raised through this awareness initiative.

Now called Heart-o-grams, these packages include gum, a red ribbon, HIV/AIDS awareness pamphlets, and optional condoms. In 2011, the Have a Heart campaign was run in over 1,600 schools across Canada with more than 1 million students participating.

Each year CANFAR gives out The Heart Award which is presented annually to the high school that demonstrates outstanding dedication and community spirit while raising research funds and HIV/AIDS awareness among their peers.

In 2006, CANFAR introduced the first annual Have a Heart Scholarship Program to recognize Have a Heart participants who have made a difference in raising awareness in their school community. Each year a $500 scholarship is awarded to a deserving student who has displayed outstanding leadership in running a successful Have a Heart campaign and demonstrated dedication to the fight against HIV/AIDS.

CANFAR has partnered with the Ontario College of Art and Design (OCAD) to create the awareness posters that are displayed in the schools. Those posters then form the basis for the awareness materials that are sent to the schools the following year.

== CANFAR Clubs ==
CANFAR Clubs are groups of students across Canada that have joined forces on college and university campuses to raise awareness about the virus and to raise funds for research. Annually, these student leaders organize parties, hold informative focus groups, and panel discussions to address the issue of AIDS, both within their demographic and internationally. The first CANFAR Club was initiated at McGill University in 2003. At McGill, Catherine Pringle and a friend decided to throw a party to spread AIDS awareness on campus called Affair en Rouge, raising funds for CANFAR.

The second CANFAR Club was born at Dalhousie University in 2004. In their first year, Dalhousie generated funds for CANFAR through small fundraising and awareness initiatives and a gala event.

In 2005, following the example set by McGill and Dalhousie, three new CANFAR Clubs were formally established at the University of Toronto Mississauga, University of Guelph and The University of Western Ontario. Together, the schools raised a combined total of more than $15,000 for HIV/AIDS research in 2005 and held AIDS awareness symposiums on campus, with the goal of initiating a frank discussion about the AIDS pandemic among their peers. In 2008, nineteen campuses were actively engaged in raising funds and awareness about HIV/AIDS.

== Board of directors ==
The main role of the board of directors is to set the strategic direction of the organization, to hire and support the President and to provide financial, regulatory and reputational oversight. The Board also takes on a fundraising role by assisting the staff through events or programs, as well as providing advice according to each individual's professional area of expertise. Influential members have included: Bluma Appel, Dr. Stanley Read, Dr. Mark Wainberg, and Andrew M. Pringle who served as President of the Board for twelve years before stepping down in 2007 to assume the role of chairman. In 1999 Andy's wife, Valerie Pringle, became CANFAR's National Spokesperson.
