= Nepean (federal electoral district) =

Federal electoral district in Ontario, Canada

Coordinates: 45.275°N 75.758°W

Ontario electoral district
- Interactive map of riding boundaries from the 2025 federal election

Federal electoral district
- Legislature: House of Commons
MP
Mark Carney
Liberal
- District created: 1987
- First contested: 1988
- Last contested: 2025
- District webpage: profile, map

Demographics
- Population (2021): 122,229
- Electors (2021): 93,391
- Area (km²): 85.6
- Pop. density (per km²): 1,427.9
- Census division: Ottawa
- Census subdivision: Ottawa (part)

Nepean is a federal electoral district in Ontario, Canada that has been represented in the House of Commons of Canada by Mark Carney, leader of the Liberal Party and Prime Minister of Canada, since 2025. The riding was previously contested from 1988 to 1997, and was reinstated during the 2012 electoral redistribution for election in 2015.

== History ==
The original riding was created in 1987 from parts of the Nepean—Carleton riding. It consisted of the City of Nepean. The electoral district was abolished in 1996 when it was redistributed between the Nepean—Carleton (54%) and the Ottawa West—Nepean (46%) ridings.

=== 2012 Federal Redistribution ===
Map of Nepean (2015 to 2025)

The riding was then reinstated in 2012 by Elections Canada, taking effect upon the dropping of the writs for the 2015 federal election, held on October 19 2015. The riding was recreated from parts of the former riding of Nepean—Carleton, essentially the former riding's more urban western portion.

=== 2022 Federal Redistribution ===
The 2022 Federal Redistribution resulted in a largely rural area (south of Bells Corners, west of Highway 416 and south of Barnsdale Road) being reallocated to the riding of Carleton. The urban parts of Bells Corners, west of Highway 416 and north of Hunt Club Road, were shifted to the new Kanata riding.

In a simplification of boundaries, the riding also picked up a portion of the Ottawa West—Nepean riding on its north side. The railway line is now the boundary between the two ridings, whereas previously it formed only the western part of the boundary, with Merivale Road and West Hunt Club forming the eastern boundary.

The new boundaries came into effect for the 2025 federal election.

== Geography ==
The most recent iteration of the riding of Nepean is described by Elections Canada as follows:

Starting at the intersection of Richmond Road with Highway No. 417, the boundary runs southeast to West Hunt Club Road, then south along Richmond Road to Hope Side Road. It continues southwest to Eagleson Road, southeast to Brophy Drive, and northeast along Brophy Drive and Bankfield Road to the Rideau River (west of Long Island). From there, it follows the river northwest and north to West Hunt Club Road, then west, northwest, and southwest to Merivale Road. It proceeds northwest to the Canadian National Railway, west along the railway to Richmond Road, and finally north along Richmond Road.

== Demographics ==
Religion in Nepean (2021, Based on 2023 Representation Order)
1. Roman Catholic (27.5%)
2. Other Christian (21.9%)
3. Muslim (13.0%)
4. Hindu (3.60%)
5. Buddhist (1.71%)
6. Jewish (1.46%)
7. Sikh (1.40%)
8. Other (0.58%)
9. Irreligion (28.7%)

According to the 2021 Canadian census, 2023 representation

Racial groups: 55.5% White, 9.5% South Asian, 8.3% Chinese, 7.9% Arab, 7.1% Black, 2.2% Southeast Asian, 2.0% Filipino, 2.0% Indigenous, 1.6% Latin American, 1.2% West Asian
Languages: 63.5% English, 8.3% French, 5.3% Arabic, 4.3% Mandarin, 1.6% Cantonese, 1.4% Spanish, 1.2% Punjabi, 1.1% Vietnamese
Religions: 49.5% Christian (27.5% Catholic, 3.5% Anglican, 3.0% United Church, 2.3% Christian Orthodox, 1.6% Pentecostal, 11.5% Other), 13.0% Muslim, 3.6% Hindu, 1.7% Buddhist, 1.5% Jewish, 1.4% Sikh, 28.7% None
Median income: $50,800 (2020)
Average income: $62,500 (2020)

== Members of Parliament ==
The riding has elected the following members of Parliament:

Parliament	Years	Member	Party
Nepean; Riding created from Nepean—Carleton
34th	1988–1993	Beryl Gaffney	Liberal
35th	1993–1997	Beryl Gaffney	Liberal
Riding dissolved into Nepean—Carleton and Ottawa West—Nepean
Riding re-created from Nepean—Carleton
42nd	2015–2019	Chandra Arya	Liberal
43rd	2019–2021	Chandra Arya	Liberal
44th	2021–2025	Chandra Arya	Liberal
45th	2025–present	Mark Carney	Liberal

== Riding associations ==
Riding associations are the local branches of the national political parties:

Party	Association name	CEO	HQ City
Conservative Party of Canada	Nepean Conservative Association	Ches W. Parsons	Ottawa
Green Party of Canada	Nepean Green Party Association	Randi Ramdeen	Ottawa
Liberal Party of Canada	Nepean Federal Liberal Association	Kanwar Hazrah	Ottawa
New Democratic Party	Nepean Federal NDP Riding Association	Maxwell Blair	Ottawa

== Election results ==
=== Nepean, 2015–present ===
2025 Canadian federal election
Party	Candidate	Votes	%	±%
Liberal	Mark Carney	46,073	63.78	+18.04
Conservative	Barbara Bal	24,017	33.25	−0.12
New Democratic	Shyam Shukla	1,424	1.97	−14.25
Green	Greg Hopkins	462	0.64	−1.30
People's	Eric Fleury	261	0.36	−2.37
Total valid votes		72,237	99.42	
Total rejected ballots		420	0.58	-0.05
Turnout		72,657	77.19	+6.57
Eligible voters		94,129		
Liberal notional hold		Swing		+9.08
Source: Elections Canada

2021 federal election redistributed results
Party	Vote	%
Liberal	27,348	45.74
Conservative	19,953	33.37
New Democratic	9,700	16.22
People's	1,631	2.73
Green	1,162	1.94
Christian Heritage	1	0.00
Total valid votes	59,795	99.37
Rejected ballots	377	0.63
Registered voters/ estimated turnout	85,204	70.62

2021 Canadian federal election
Party	Candidate	Votes	%	±%	Expenditures
Liberal	Chandra Arya	29,620	45.1	-0.8	$109,271.27
Conservative	Matt Triemstra	22,184	33.7	+0.2	$75,325.90
New Democratic	Sean Devine	10,786	16.4	+3.3	$12,498.65
People's	Jay Nera	1,840	2.8	+1.8	$0.00
Green	Gordon Kubanek	1,318	2.0	-4.3	$786.11
Total valid votes/expense limit		65,748	–	–	$121,196.92
Total rejected ballots		419			
Turnout		66,167	70.85		
Eligible voters		93,391			
Source: Elections Canada

2019 Canadian federal election
Party	Candidate	Votes	%	±%	Expenditures
Liberal	Chandra Arya	31,933	45.9	-6.52	$107,465.36
Conservative	Brian St. Louis	23,320	33.5	-2.63	$110,373.63
New Democratic	Zaff Ansari	9,104	13.1	+4.90	$3,771.41
Green	Jean-Luc Cooke	4,379	6.3	+3.97	$7,732.54
People's	Azim Hooda	687	1.0		none listed
Communist	Dustan Wang	160	0.2		none listed
Total valid votes/expense limit		69,583	100.0		
Total rejected ballots		407			
Turnout		69,990	75.2		
Eligible voters		93,119			
Liberal hold		Swing		-1.95	
Source: Elections Canada

2015 Canadian federal election
Party	Candidate	Votes	%	±%	Expenditures
Liberal	Chandra Arya	34,017	52.42	+25.32	$180,234.39
Conservative	Andy Wang	23,442	36.13	-14.89	$160,893.69
New Democratic	Sean Devine	5,324	8.20	-9.62	$23,472.19
Green	Jean-Luc Roger Cooke	1,513	2.33	-1.70	$14,291.13
Independent	Jesus Cosico	416	0.64	–	–
Independent	Hubert Mamba	69	0.11	–	$1,309.19
Independent	Harry Splett	66	0.10	–	–
Marxist–Leninist	Tony Seed	41	0.06	–	–
Total valid votes/Expense limit		64,888	100.00		$219,121.45
Total rejected ballots		262	0.40	–	
Turnout		65,150	78.52	–	
Eligible voters		82,976			
Liberal notional gain from Conservative		Swing		+20.10	
Source: Elections Canada

2011 federal election redistributed results
Party	Vote	%
Conservative	26,087	51.02
Liberal	13,863	27.11
New Democratic	9,117	17.83
Green	2,062	4.03

=== Nepean, 1988–1997 ===
1993 Canadian federal election
Party	Candidate	Votes	%	±%
Liberal	Beryl Gaffney	33,376	59.55	+12.37
Progressive Conservative	Donna Hicks	9,668	17.25	–24.21
Reform	Gus Klovan	9,114	16.26	
New Democratic	Nizam Siddiqui	1,967	3.51	–7.33
National	Ralph Anderson	979	1.75	
Green	Andrew Van Iterson	420	0.75	
Natural Law	Brian Jackson	255	0.45	
Libertarian	Brian MacKintosh	133	0.24	
Commonwealth of Canada	Marko Braovac	105	0.19	–0.33
Abolitionist	Tonis Kasvand	33	0.06	
Total valid votes		56,050	100.0	
Liberal hold		Swing		+18.29

1988 Canadian federal election
Party	Candidate	Votes	%
Liberal	Beryl Gaffney	26,632	47.18
Progressive Conservative	Bill Tupper	23,399	41.46
New Democratic	Bea Murray	6,119	10.84
Commonwealth of Canada	Debbie Brennan	292	0.52
Total valid votes		56,442	100.0

== See also ==
- List of Canadian electoral districts
- Historical federal electoral districts of Canada

Parliament of Canada
Preceded by Papineau	Constituency represented by the Prime Minister; 2025–present	Succeeded by Incumbent
