= Red Fisher (sportsman) =

- Born: Bernard Herbert Goldstein; February 18, 1914
- Died: May 5, 2006 (aged 92); Chatham, Ontario
- Occupation(s): broadcaster, sportsman
- Known for: The Red Fisher Show

Bernard Herbert "Red Fisher" Goldstein (February 18, 1914 – May 5, 2006) was an American sporting goods retailer, U.S. naval and United States Coast Guard officer, newspaper columnist, and poet. With his gruff voice, he later became a popular radio and television personality in Canada.

When he moved to Canada in 1963, he launched what would become a popular radio talk show program The Red Fisher Show which moved to television in 1968. The TV version was set at fictitious "Scuttlebutt Lodge" and featured silent home movies of outdoors activities, often involving fishing, which involved high-profile guests, mainly from the major league sports of the era. Such guests included ice hockey stars Gordie Howe, Eddie Shack, and Johnny Bower, and baseball players Ted Williams, Roger Maris and Ferguson Jenkins. The Red Fisher Show differed from other outdoor living shows of its time by promoting nature conservation, game preservation and the "catch and release" mentality. The series continued until 1989, making it among the longest-running on CTV. The series was an inspiration for the comedy television series The Red Green Show.

At the same time, his weekly column, Outdoor Topics, was read in over 180 newspapers. In 1971, Fisher's first book of poems, Poems of Our Great Outdoors, was published and distributed. Red Fisher would famously give each guest on his show a copy of these poems. Three editions of Poems of Our Great Outdoors were released, each one simply adding more poems to the previous collection. Red released a record on Saga Records also called Poems of Our Great Outdoors in which he read his poems to a symphonic background.

Fisher was inducted into the National Fresh Water Fishing Hall of Fame in 1988. In 2000, he released a collection of stories and anecdotes from his life called Tight Lines and Tall Tales (ISBN 9780968976104). A portion of the profits was donated to outdoor conservation efforts.

Fisher's parents were Henry George Goldstein and Rose (Fisher) Goldstein who were married at Beth Israel Bikur Cholim in New York City and later lived Cleveland, Ohio, where Fisher (still going by Bernard Goldstein) operated a used appliance store. Fisher was the youngest of three children, sister Miriam "Nada" (Goldstein) Polster, who had a brief career as an artist in Hollywood and brother, Daniel Irwin Goldstein, who worked as a department store executive but had a passion for art and design.

Fisher died in Chatham, Ontario at the age of 92.

== In popular culture ==
The Red Green Show, created by Canadian comedian Steve Smith, was a spoof of Fisher's several TV titles, some incarnations of which were Tall Tale Adventures and Our Great Outdoors.

Canadian comedy show SCTV spoofed The Red Fisher Show in a skit called The Fishin' Musician in which John Candy played a Red Fisher-like character and featured numerous musical acts.

Canadian comedy troupe The Frantics mention Fisher in their sketch, “Heaven Is for Presbyterians”. In the sketch, the archangel Gabriel tells a Catholic trying to get into Heaven that following the tenets of his religion was useless and that he "may as well have stayed home and watched Red Fisher."

A parody booklet of humorous rhymes, Wild Poems by B.S. 'Fred' Risher, is another project his legacy inspired.
