= Gordon Blair (politician) =

Canadian politician

Duncan Gordon Blair

Member of Parliament for Grenville—Carleton
- In office June 1968 – September 1972
- Preceded by: Riding established
- Succeeded by: Walter Baker

Personal details
- Born: 23 December 1919 Regina, Saskatchewan, Canada
- Died: 14 June 2006 (aged 86)
- Party: Liberal
- Education: University of Saskatchewan
- Profession: Lawyer

Duncan Gordon Blair (23 December 1919 – 14 June 2006) was a Canadian lawyer, politician, judge and a Liberal party member of the House of Commons of Canada. He was born in Regina, Saskatchewan.

Blair was educated in Regina before receiving a bachelor of arts degree in 1939 and a bachelor of law degree in 1941 from the University of Saskatchewan. He was called to the Bar of Saskatchewan in 1942 and Bar of Ontario in 1952. A 1941 Rhodes Scholar, he attended Exeter College where he studied law and received a bachelor of civil law in 1947. During World War II, he served as a lieutenant with the Irish Regiment of Canada and was wounded in Italy in 1944.

After the war, he served as a foreign service officer with the Department of External Affairs from 1945 to 1947. From 1948 to 1950, he was a partner with the law firm of Francis, Woods, Gauley & Blair. From 1951 to 1952, he was executive assistant to the Minister of Justice. From 1953 to 1975, he was a partner with the law firm of Herridge, Tolmie, Gray, Coyne & Blair in Ottawa. He was created a Queen's Counsel in 1975.

He was elected to the House of Commons of Canada for the riding of Grenville—Carleton in the 1968 federal election. A Liberal, he was defeated in the 1972 federal election by Walter Baker of the Progressive Conservative party. In 1976, he was appointed to the Court of Appeal for Ontario where he served until 1994. From 1994 to 1998, he was the grand president of the Royal Canadian Legion.

In 1998, he was made a member of the Order of Canada.
