= Nepean—Carleton (federal electoral district) =

Former federal electoral district in Ontario, Canada

Coordinates: 45.230°N 75.667°W

Ontario electoral district
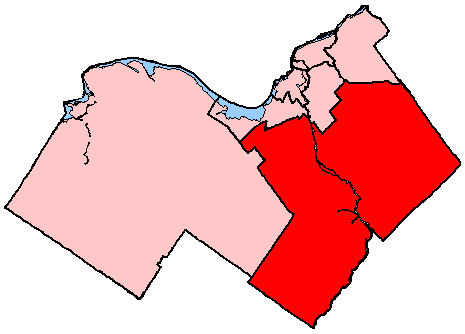
- Nepean—Carleton in relation to other electoral districts in Ottawa

Defunct federal electoral district
- Legislature: House of Commons
- District created: 1976
- District abolished: 2013
- First contested: 1979
- Last contested: 2011
- District webpage: profile, map

Demographics
- Population (2011): 159,032
- Electors (2011): 103,414
- Area (km²): 1,128.05
- Census division: Ottawa
- Census subdivision: Ottawa

Nepean—Carleton was a federal electoral district in Ontario, Canada that was represented in the House of Commons from 1979 to 1988, and again from 1997 to 2015.

It included the southern portion of the former city of Nepean and adjacent suburban and rural areas of west and southern Ottawa.

== Geography ==
Nepean—Carleton consisted of the part of the City of Ottawa lying east and south of a line drawn from the southwestern city limit, northeast along the southeast limit of the former Township of Goulbourn, northwest along McCordick Road and Eagleson Road to the southern limit of the former City of Kanata, then along the southern and eastern limits of Kanata, northwest along Eagleson Road, northeast along Highway 417, southwest along Richmond Road, east along the Canadian National Railway, southeast along Merivale Road, east along West Hunt Club Road, south along the Rideau River, east along the former southern limit of the City of Ottawa, south along Riverside Drive, southeast along Limebank Road, northeast along Leitrim Road, northwest along the Canadian Pacific Railway, northeast along Lester Road, northwest along Conroy Road, northeast along Hunt Club Road to Hawthorne Road and then in a straight line to Blake Road, and northeast along Blake Road, east along Highway 417, and southeast along Boundary Road to the eastern city limit.

== History ==
The riding was created in 1976 from parts of Grenville—Carleton and Ottawa—Carleton. In 1987, it was first abolished and redistributed between the ridings of Nepean, Carleton—Gloucester and Lanark—Carleton.

In 1996, it was re-created from parts of Nepean, Carleton—Gloucester, Lanark—Carleton and Ottawa South ridings.

It consisted initially of the townships of Goulbourn, Osgoode and Rideau, and the City of Nepean, excluding the northeastern part lying north and east of a line drawn from the western city limit east along the Queensway (Highway 417), southwest along Richmond Road, east along the Canadian National Railway, north along Merivale Road, and east along the northern boundary of the National Capital Commission buffer zone to the eastern city limit.

It was given its final boundaries described above in 2003.

The riding was represented by Conservative MP Pierre Poilievre from 2004 until it was abolished due to the 2012 federal electoral boundaries redistribution. The riding was split almost in half; most of the northwestern portion became Nepean, with most of the southern portion joining Carleton. Small parts went to Orléans and Kanata—Carleton.

== Members of Parliament ==
This riding has elected the following members of the House of Commons:

Parliament	Years	Member	Party
Nepean—Carleton; Riding created from Grenville—Carleton and Ottawa—Carleton
31st	1979–1980	Walter Baker	Progressive Conservative
32nd	1980–1984	Walter Baker	Progressive Conservative
33rd	1984–1988	William Tupper	Progressive Conservative
Riding dissolved into Nepean, Carleton—Gloucester and Lanark—Carleton
Riding re-created from Nepean, Carleton—Gloucester, Lanark—Carleton and Ottawa South
36th	1997–2000	David Pratt	Liberal
37th	2000–2004	David Pratt	Liberal
38th	2004–2006	Pierre Poilievre	Conservative
39th	2006–2008	Pierre Poilievre	Conservative
40th	2008–2011	Pierre Poilievre	Conservative
41st	2011–2015	Pierre Poilievre	Conservative
Riding dissolved into Nepean, Carleton, Orléans, and Kanata—Carleton

== Election results ==
=== 1997–2015 ===
2011 Canadian federal election
Party	Candidate	Votes	%	±%	Expenditures
Conservative	Pierre Poilievre	43,477	54.45	-1.39	–
Liberal	Ryan Keon	20,146	25.23	+1.81	–
New Democratic	Ric Dagenais	12,962	16.23	+6.52	–
Green	Jean-Luc Cooke	3,260	4.08	-6.94	–
Total valid votes/Expense limit		79,845	100.00		–
Total rejected ballots		272	0.34	-0.05	
Turnout		80,117	72.55	+3.16	
Eligible voters		110,425	–	–	

2008 Canadian federal election
Party	Candidate	Votes	%	±%	Expenditures
Conservative	Pierre Poilievre	39,915	55.84	+1.1	$86,150
Liberal	Ed Mahfouz	16,743	23.42	-4.6	$40,049
Green	Lori Gadzala	7,880	11.02	+5.3	$21,886
New Democratic	Phil Brown	6,946	9.71	-1.9	$16,371
Total valid votes/Expense limit		71,484	100.00		$99,843
Total rejected ballots		280	0.39	–	
Total votes		71,764	69.39	–	

2006 Canadian federal election
Party	Candidate	Votes	%	±%
Conservative	Pierre Poilievre	39,260	54.7	+9.0
Liberal	Michael Gaffney	20,111	28.0	-12.1
New Democratic	Laurel Gibbons	8,324	11.6	+2.5
Green	Lori Gadzala	4,090	5.7	+1.4
Total valid votes		71,785	100.0	

2004 Canadian federal election
Party	Candidate	Votes	%	±%
Conservative	Pierre Poilievre	30,420	45.7	-7.7
Liberal	David Pratt	26,684	40.1	-1.1
New Democratic	Phil Brown	6,072	9.1	+5.4
Green	Chris Walker	2,886	4.3	+3.0
Marijuana	Brad Powers	561	0.8	
Total valid votes		66,623	100.0	

Note: Conservative vote is compared to the total of the Canadian Alliance vote and Progressive Conservative vote in 2000 election.

2000 Canadian federal election
Party	Candidate	Votes	%	±%
Liberal	David Pratt	24,570	41.2	-7.6
Alliance	Michael Green	22,310	37.4	+11.0
Progressive Conservative	Bill Knott	9,536	16.0	-3.1
New Democratic	Craig Parsons	2,223	3.7	-1.1
Green	Isobel McGregor	805	1.3	
Canadian Action	Jack Waisvisz	131	0.2	-0.3
Natural Law	Lester Newby	118	0.2	-0.2
Total valid votes		59,693	100.0	

Note: Canadian Alliance vote is compared to the Reform vote in 1997 election.

1997 Canadian federal election
Party	Candidate	Votes	%
Liberal	David Pratt	28,366	48.8
Reform	Paul Fitzgerald	15,333	26.4
Progressive Conservative	Betty Hill	11,072	19.0
New Democratic	Cathy Martin	2,788	4.8
Canadian Action	Terrence Bell	331	0.6
Natural Law	Brian Jackson	238	0.4
Total valid votes		58,128	100.0

=== 1979–1988 ===
1984 Canadian federal election
Party	Candidate	Votes	%	±%
Progressive Conservative	Bill Tupper	41,663	55.9	+2.4
Liberal	Gord Hunter	20,852	28.0	-5.1
New Democratic	Bea Murray	11,035	14.8	+2.6
Green	Gregory Vezina	737	1.0	
Independent	Ray Turmel	204	0.3	
Total valid votes		74,491	100.0	

1980 Canadian federal election
Party	Candidate	Votes	%	±%
Progressive Conservative	Walter Baker	31,498	53.5	-6.0
Liberal	Gord Hunter	19,482	33.1	+5.4
New Democratic	Alan White	7,187	12.2	-0.5
Rhinoceros	Alan Cockerell	658	1.1	
Total valid votes		58,825	100.0	

1979 Canadian federal election
Party	Candidate	Votes	%
Progressive Conservative	Walter Baker	36,717	59.6
Liberal	Bluma Appel	17,108	27.8
New Democratic	Marnie Girvan	7,810	12.7
Total valid votes		61,635	100.0

== See also ==
- List of Canadian electoral districts
- Historical federal electoral districts of Canada
