= Valerie Pringle =

Canadian journalist

Valerie Pringle CM
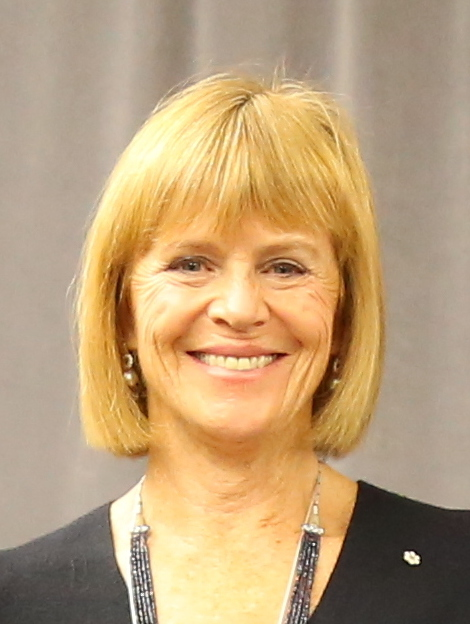
- Valerie Pringle at the 2016 Great Lakes Forum
- Born: Valerie Whittingham; 5 September 1953 (age 72); Windsor, Ontario
- Education: Ryerson University
- Occupations: Journalist, TV Host
- Television: Midday, Canada AM, Valerie Pringle Has Left the Building, Canadian Antiques Roadshow
- Spouse: Andy Pringle
- Children: 3

Valerie Pringle CM (née Whittingham, born 5 September 1953) is a Canadian television host and journalist, hosting the Canadian edition of Antiques Roadshow on CBC since 2006. Pringle was born in Windsor, Ontario.

Pringle began her career in broadcasting as a summer student with Toronto radio station CFRB in 1973, and became a full-time reporter for the station the following year. In 1981, she hosted her own daily series on CFRB, The Pringle Program.

In 1984, Pringle moved to the CBC as one of the original cohosts of Midday. She stayed with Midday until 1992, when she moved to CTV to co-host Canada AM.

With CTV, Pringle was also a host of special events programming such as the network's 1993 election and 1995 Quebec referendum coverage and the 1994 Olympics in Lillehammer, Norway.

Pringle remained with Canada AM until 2001. Since then, she hosted a travel show with CTV, Valerie Pringle Has Left the Building, from 2002 to 2006, documentary specials for Discovery Channel Canada, and the Canadian edition of Antiques Roadshow on CBC from 2006. In 2006, she was made a Member of the Order of Canada. She lives in Toronto, Ontario.

She is married to Andy Pringle, previously chairman of Upper Canada College's Board of Governors and chief of staff to then Ontario Progressive Conservative Party leader John Tory, former mayor of Toronto. They have three children: a daughter named Catherine and two sons.

Pringle is also an official spokesperson for the Canadian Foundation for AIDS Research. She is a member of the board of directors of the Trans Canada Trail and the Trans Canada Trail Foundation.

In 2025, she announced her retirement after five decades in journalism.
