= Beryl Gaffney =

Canadian politician

Member of Parliament for Nepean
- In office November 21, 1988 – April 26, 1997
- Preceded by: District established
- Succeeded by: District abolished

Personal details
- Born: April 1, 1930 (age 96) Summerside, Prince Edward Island, Canada
- Party: Liberal
- Spouse: Joseph Cuthbert Gaffney (died 2014)
- Profession: Executive Assistant
- Website: Parliamentary Profile

Beryl Gaffney (née Clark; born April 1, 1930) is a Canadian former politician and public servant. She served as a city councillor in Nepean, Ontario from 1978 to 1988 serving concurrently on the council of the Regional Municipality of Ottawa-Carleton.

Born in Summerside, Prince Edward Island, she was elected to the House of Commons of Canada as the Liberal MP for Nepean in the 1988 federal election and was re-elected in 1993. She served as chair of the Standing Committee on Human Rights and the Status of Disabled Persons from 1994 to 1996. During this period she was diagnosed with a brain tumour and, after successful surgery, was able to return to the House of Commons to resume her valuable contribution to health issues. She did not run for re-election in 1997.

In 1998, Gaffney was appointed to the Board of Governors of the International Development Research Centre by Foreign Minister Lloyd Axworthy.
