= The Body Works =

Canadian children's television series

The Body Works is a Canadian educational children's television series which was produced by TVOntario and Access. The show debuted in 1980 and consisted of 40 ten-minute episodes. The show taught exercise, health, and nutrition to children.
