= The Red Fisher Show =

Canadian television series

The Red Fisher Show is a Canadian television series which aired on CTV for 21 seasons and 678 half-hour episodes from January 4, 1968 to May 10, 1989.

== Format ==
Each half-hour show featured host and American expatriate B. H. "Red" Fisher, with guest appearances accompanied by footage of fishing and hunting expeditions in various regions of Canada and the United States. The show takes place in the fictional town of Scuttlebutt Lodge. The show was subject to parody, in the form of the also popular The Red Green Show, and SCTV's The Fishin' Musician with John Candy as host Gil Fisher. The program was broadcast on Saturday afternoons.

== Guests ==
Dates indicated are based on broadcasts on CFTO-TV Toronto:

- Gordon "Red" Berenson, hockey player (3 July 1971)
- Johnny Bower, hockey player
- Bill Culluton, flycaster (17 July 1971)
- Ben Hardesty, World Casting Champion (11 September 1971)
- Alan Hale, Jr., actor
- Stan Mikita, hockey player
- Gordie Howe, hockey player
- Ferguson Jenkins, baseball
- Ben Johnson, actor
- Roger Maris, baseball (10 July 1971)
- Merlin Olsen, football player
- Slim Pickens, actor
- Eddie Shack, hockey player
- Ted Williams, baseball player (11 March 1972)

== See also ==
- B. H. Fisher
