= Careers TV =

Canadian television series

Careers TV was a weekly Canadian daytime television series providing viewers with information about the Canadian job market to help them professionally and personally. The format was entertaining, sending reporters across the country to interview people about unique careers and business opportunities. First aired in 2002, the 30-minute program was carried on channels such as Canadian Learning Television and Access.

== Noteworthy guests ==
- Jim Culbert, the proprietor of Rainbow Lodge on Prince Edward Island, was interviewed on Careers TV about his experience as a gay entrepreneur.
