= Circle Ranch =

- U.S. National Register of Historic Places
- U.S. Historic district
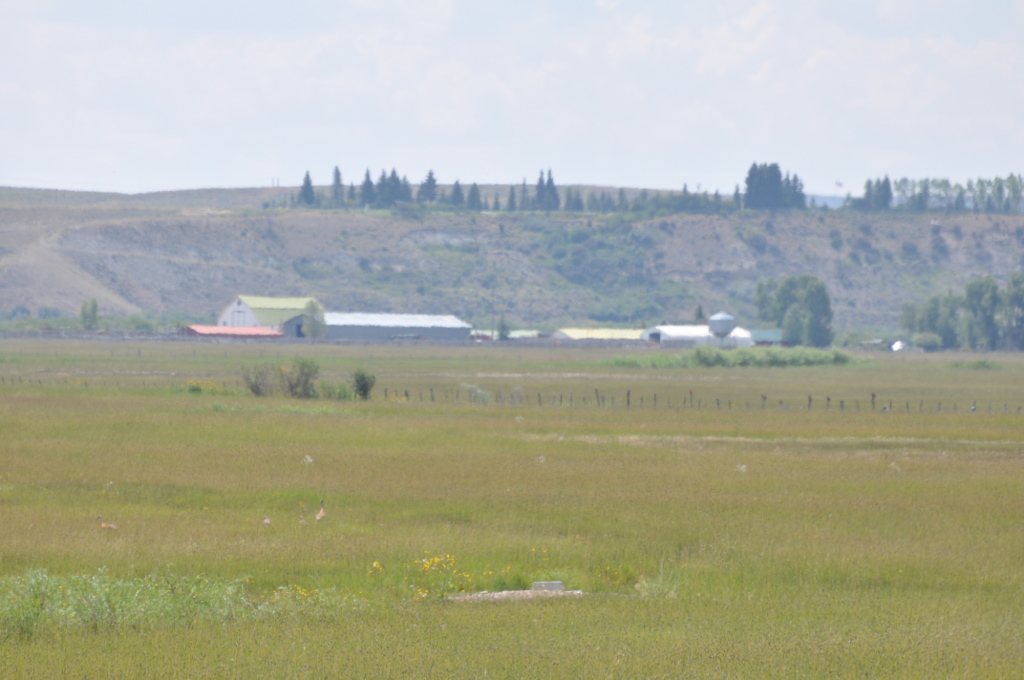

- Location within Wyoming Location within the United States
- Location: Sublette County, Wyoming, USA
- Nearest city: Big Piney, Wyoming
- Coordinates: 42°31′19″N 110°10′49″W
- Area: 3.8 acres (1.5 ha)
- Built: 1878
- Architect: Leifer, Otto; Mickelson, James
- NRHP reference No.: 87000778
- Added to NRHP: May 14, 1987

The Circle Ranch, also known as the R.L. Miller Ranch has been continuously operated as a working cattle ranch for more than 100 years. Located in Sublette County, Wyoming, United States, it was first occupied as a homestead by Otto Liefer between 1878 and 1880. Liefer sold his claim to James Mickelson in 1895, who developed the ranch into one of the largest ranching operations in the area. The ranch has remained in the Mickelson family ever since.

The cottonwood log Liefer cabin remains standing, along with a cabin built about the same time by Nicolas Swan. Together, they are the oldest permanent structures standing in Sublette County. The early cabins are surrounded by ranch buildings built by the Mickelson-Miller family, including a 1905 ranch house. By 1915 Mickelsons' holdings in the area amounted to 20,000 acres (8,100 ha), with 6000 cattle.

The Circle Ranch was placed on the National Register of Historic Places in 1987.
