= Kareen Zebroff =

Canadian-based author, actor and television host specialising in yoga

Kareen Zebroff (born 1941 in Windsbach, Germany) is a Canadian-based author, actor and television host specialising in yoga. She and her family fled Marienbad as a child, due to the Soviet occupations in the Czech Republic immediately following World War II. She emigrated to Canada in the mid-1950s when her family settled in Dawson Creek, British Columbia.

She hosted a CTV television series, Kareen's Yoga from 1970 to 1979.

Her dramatic work include appearances on episodes of television series such as The Beachcombers, Danger Bay and MacGyver.
