= Landscape of Geometry =

Canadian children's television series

- Starring: David Stringer
- Country of origin: Canada
- Original language: English
- No. of seasons: 1
- No. of episodes: 8 (list of episodes)

Original release
- Network: TVOntario
- Release: 1 January 1982 – 1 January 1983

Landscape of Geometry was an educational television show that illustrated the principles and applications of geometry. The series was produced and broadcast by TVOntario in 1982–83 and was hosted by David Stringer. A videotape edition of the show was produced in 1992 by Films for the Humanities.

== Episode list ==
Eight episodes were produced. They were:

1. "The Shape of Things"
2. "It's Rude to Point"
3. "Lines That Cross"
4. "Lines That Don't Cross"
5. "Up, Down, and Sideways"
6. "Trussworthy"
7. "Cracked Up"
8. "The Range of Change"

All episodes were 15 minutes in length.
