= William Tupper =

Canadian politician

William (Bill) Tupper (born 7 October 1933) was a Progressive Conservative party member of the House of Commons of Canada. He was a businessman, geologist and professor by career. He was a Municipal Councillor for North Gower in 1973, and the mayor of Rideau Township from 1974 to 1978.

He was elected at Nepean—Carleton electoral district in the 1984 federal election, thus he served in the 33rd Canadian Parliament. In the 1988 federal election, he ran in the Nepean riding but was defeated by Beryl Gaffney of the Liberal party.

== Electoral record ==
1988 Canadian federal election
Party	Candidate	Votes
Liberal	Beryl Gaffney	26,632
Progressive Conservative	William Tupper	23,399
New Democratic	Bea Murray	6,119
Commonwealth of Canada	Debbie Brennan	292

1984 Canadian federal election
Party	Candidate	Votes	%	±%
Progressive Conservative	William Tupper	41,663	55.9	+2.4
Liberal	Gord Hunter	20,852	28.0	-5.1
New Democratic	Bea Murray	11,035	14.8	+2.6
Green	Gregory Vezina	737	1.0	
Independent	Ray Turmel	204	0.3	
Total valid votes		74,491	100.0	
