= Mary Berg (chef) =

Canadian television host, author and cook

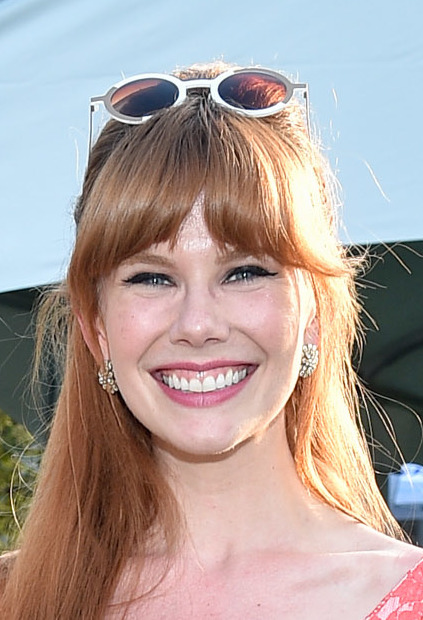
- Mary Berg at the 2019 CFC Garden Party
- Born: 13 December 1989 (age 36); Pickering, Ontario, Canada
- Education: Wilfrid Laurier University; University of Toronto
- Occupations: Insurance broker (former); Cook; TV host; Author
- Known for: Masterchef Canada; Mary's Kitchen Crush
- Spouse: Aaron Mariash (m. 2016)
- Website: www.asmallstove.com

Mary Berg (born 13 December 1989) is a Canadian television host, author and cook, who rose to fame as the winner of the third season of MasterChef Canada. She has been the host of two television cooking shows, Mary's Kitchen Crush and Mary Makes It Easy, and the daytime talk show, The Good Stuff with Mary Berg, and returned to the Masterchef Canada kitchen as a judge in fall 2025 for its upcoming eighth season. She has released three cookbooks, Kitchen Party, Well Seasoned and In Mary's Kitchen.

== Early life ==
Berg was born in Pickering, Ontario. When she was four years old, Berg was in a car accident in which her father died. Her mother and brother survived the accident with injuries, but Berg survived relatively unscathed. Berg helped out preparing meals for her family from about age 7 and by age 13 was cooking dinner for her family on her own.

Berg attended Pine Ridge Secondary School in Pickering, Ontario, and later went on to obtain her bachelor's degree from Wilfrid Laurier University, double majoring in history and English. She then pursued a master's degree in information science at the University of Toronto.

== Career ==
After university, Berg became an insurance broker. She left her job to compete in MasterChef Canada in 2016. Berg was the winner of season 3 of MasterChef Canada and the first ever female winner of the show.

Since winning MasterChef Canada, Berg has appeared as a regular food expert on television shows like Your Morning and The Marilyn Denis Show. In 2017, Berg starred in an eight-episode cooking show on Gusto called Mary's Big Kitchen Party. She served as a culinary consultant for the Star Trek: Discovery episode, "Vaulting Ambition."

Berg is the first MasterChef Canada winner to host her own cooking show, Mary's Kitchen Crush. The show premiered on CTV in April 2019. Mary's Kitchen Crush won the Canadian Screen Award for Best Lifestyle Series, and Berg won for Best Lifestyle Host, at the 8th Canadian Screen Awards in 2020. Mary’s Kitchen Crush won the Canadian Screen Award for Best Lifestyle Series again in 2021 at the 9th Canadian Screen Awards, where Berg also won Best Lifestyle Host.

Berg's first cookbook, Kitchen Party, was published in September 2019.

In 2021, Berg premiered the new series Mary Makes It Easy, designed around simple, easy-to-make recipes for people who struggle with their cooking skills, on CTV Life Channel. That same year, she released her second cookbook, Well Seasoned. Well Seasoned won the gold medal at the 2022 Taste Canada Awards for best general cookbook.

On 6 April 2022, Berg won the Canadian Screen Award for Host, Lifestyle at the 10th Canadian Screen Awards. Mary Makes It Easy also won the award for Lifestyle Program or Series, on which Berg is a co-executive producer.

On 12 April 2023, Berg hosted the 11th Canadian Screen Awards ceremony for Lifestyle and Reality Television categories. Mary Makes It Easy won in three categories, including 'Best Lifestyle Program or Series', 'Best Direction, Lifestyle or Information', and 'Best Photography, Lifestyle or Reality/Competition'.

In February 2022, Mary Makes It Easy premiered on Food Network in the USA. She served as co-host for the CTV show, Cross Country Cake Off, which premiered in December 2022.

In June 2023, Berg was announced as the host of The Good Stuff with Mary Berg, a new daily talk and lifestyle series replacing The Marilyn Denis Show on CTV's daytime schedule. The show's name came from a quote Berg included in her first cookbook from Ratatouille: "‘If you are what you eat, then I only want to eat the good stuff." The Good Stuff premiered on 5 September and airs weekdays at 10am Eastern Time.

In July 2023, Berg announced that she will be hosting a podcast called Mary's Reservation for Two. Her third cookbook, In Mary’s Kitchen: Stress-Free Recipes for Every Home Cook was published in October 2023. In Mary's Kitchen won a 2024 Taste Canada Awards in the General Cookbooks category.

A series of poorly photo-shopped ads were taken out on X in January 2024 falsely claiming Berg had been arrested. The Good Stuff addressed the ads on X on 5 January, writing "We are aware of the ongoing issue of fake advertisements targeting Mary Berg. We encourage our followers to remain vigilant against these deceptive ads and report suspicious content to the platform they're using." The ads were determined to be a cryptocurrency scam.

On May 30, 2025 Berg won in two categories at the 13th Canadian Screen Awards. Mary Makes It Easy won for Best Lifestyle Program or Series, on which Berg produces, and for Best Host, Lifestyle. The Good Stuff with Mary Berg was also awarded Best Talk or Entertainment News Series. Berg was also nominated as Best Host, Talk Show or Entertainment News for The Good Stuff with Mary Berg.

On June 5, 2025 it was announced at the Bell Media Upfronts that Berg will be appearing as judge on the upcoming Season 8 of Masterchef Canada, along with Toronto chef and restauranteur Craig Wong and chef and former Top Chef judge Hugh Acheson.

== Personal life ==
Berg met Aaron Mariash in 2009 while they were both students at Wilfrid Laurier University. In October 2016, the couple married at Le Select Bistro in Toronto, Ontario.

She has been a pescatarian for more than 15 years, though she cooks meat on her show.

== Bibliography ==
- Kitchen Party: Effortless Recipes for Every Occasion (Appetite by Random House, 2019)
- Well Seasoned: A Year's Worth of Delicious Recipes (Appetite by Random House, 2021)
- In Mary’s Kitchen: Stress-Free Recipes for Every Home Cook (Appetite by Random House, 2023)

== Filmography ==
=== Television ===
Year	Show	Role	Notes
2016	MasterChef Canada	self	Season three winner
2018-2023	The Marilyn Denis Show	self	
2018	Star Trek: Discovery	Culinary consultant	Episode: Vaulting Ambition
2019-2020	Mary's Kitchen Crush	self	host
2021-2023	Mary Makes it Easy	self	host
2022-2023	Cross Country Cake-Off	self	co-host
2023-pres.	The Good Stuff with Mary Berg	self	host
2025	MasterChef Canada	self	judge
