= Wonder Why? =

Canadian children's television series

Wonder Why? is a Canadian educational television program for children, produced by ATV in Halifax, Nova Scotia and aired nationally by CTV between 1990 and 1994. The program starred then-ATV chief meteorologist Richard Zurawski as the host and Liam Hyland as the young detective Question Mark. Running for 4 seasons, the Maritime-based science show won the CanPro Award each year for Best Educational Show for children. Each episode examined topics related to science, technology, and everyday items or processes.

== Cast ==
| Charles T. Conrad | Mean Brother |
| Thomas Gauthier | Willy Wonder (1990-1992) |
| Liam Hyland | Question Mark |
| Christopher Walters | Willy Wonder |
| Richard Zurawski | Self |
