= Mary Makes It Easy =

Canadian television cooking show

- Presented by: Mary Berg
- Country of origin: Canada
- Original language: English
- No. of seasons: 3
- No. of episodes: 63

Production
- Executive producers: Lesia Capone; Allison Grace; Cathie Jones
- Production companies: Proper Television (seasons 1–3); Blue Ant Studios (season 4–)

Original release
- Network: CTV Life Channel
- Release: September 6, 2021 – present

Mary Makes It Easy is a Canadian television cooking show hosted by Mary Berg, which premiered on CTV Life Channel in 2021. The show, which is shot in Berg's real home kitchen, is designed around simple, easy-to-make recipes for people who struggle with their cooking skills.

Episodes also air on CTV and CTV 2 after premiering on CTV Life Channel. In February 2022, Mary Makes It Easy premiered on Food Network in the United States.

The series won two Canadian Screen Awards at the 10th Canadian Screen Awards in 2022, for Best Lifestyle Program and Best Host in a Lifestyle Program (Berg).

On April 12, 2023, at the 11th Canadian Screen Awards, the show won three additional awards including Best Lifestyle Program or Series, Best Direction, Lifestyle or Information, and Best Photography, Lifestyle or Reality/Competition.

On May 30, 2025, at the 13th Canadian Screen Awards, the won in 2 categories: Best Host, Lifestyle, and Best Lifestyle Program or Series. It was nominated in an additional 3 categories, including Best Direction, Lifestyle or Information, Best Photography, Lifestyle or Reality/Competition, and Best Picture Editing, Factual.

== Production ==
The series was announced by Bell Media in March 2021, when CTV Life Channel and Boat Rocker Media unscripted division Boat Rocker Studios, Unscripted through its subsidiary Proper Television commissioned a new cooking series called Mary Makes It Easy with television host, author & cook Mary Berg presenting the culinary series as Boat Rocker Studios, Unscripted under its subsidiary Proper Television will produce the series whilst Boat Rocker's international distribution arm Boat Rocker Rights handling global distribution for the series.

In September 2025 when Proper Television's former parent Boat Rocker Media sold three of its production subsidiaries including Mary Makes It Easy producer Proper Television to Blue Ant Media a month prior in August of that year, Proper Television's new parent Blue Ant Studios under its international distribution unit Blue Ant Rights took over distribution for the series.
