= INK Entertainment =

Hospitality and entertainment company

INK Entertainment Group
- Industry: Hospitality and Entertainment
- Founded: 1982
- Founder: Charles Khabouth
- Headquarters: 144 Bloor Street West, 7th Floor, Toronto, Ontario, Canada
- Key people: Charles Khabouth (CEO); Danny Soberano (President)
- Number of employees: 1,600+ (2013)
- Website: inkentertainment.com

INK Entertainment is a hospitality and entertainment company headquartered in Toronto, Canada. The company maintains various properties, primarily nightclubs and restaurants. Additionally, INK Entertainment operates a country club, two annual music festivals, two talent agencies. The Bisha Hotel & Residences is also part of its portfolio. Most of its properties are located in Toronto (either in the city's Entertainment District, Fashion District or in its ritzy Yorkville neighborhood), with a few others in Montreal, Niagara Falls, the Miami area, and Las Vegas.

Founded and run by Charles Khabouth, INK currently owns and operates Toronto's Product nightclub, Dragonfly nightclub (on Niagara Fallsview Casino Resort grounds), Cube nightclub and La Société restaurant. Furthermore, INK, in partnership with Nick Di Donato's Liberty Entertainment Group, is the parent company of Tattoo Queen West rock club and Spice Route bistro bar. Their partnership has since grown to include the Coral Gables Country Club located in south Miami, Florida. INK has also teamed up with Lifetime Developments with the launch of Bisha Hotel & Residences, the newest private label hotel and residence brand to originate in Toronto since The Four Seasons in the 1960s.

== Venues ==
=== Nightclubs ===
==== REBEL Nightclub (formerly known as Sound Academy) ====
As of October 1, 2016, the Sound Academy changed its name to REBEL and reopened, completely renovated. Ink Entertainment collaborated with Studio Munge to design the 45,000 square foot nightclub, with a 65-foot stage. The nightclub will be hosting multiple global artists such as DJ Snake, DVBBS, Tory Lanez, and Passenger (singer), among many other.

==== Cube ====
Cube, previously known as Ultra Supper Club from 2003 until 2012, is a nightclub located in downtown Toronto on Queen West near Spadina that can hold up to 650 people between its indoor lounge and rooftop patio. Catering to affluent 25-plus young professionals, Cube's black and gold interior is inspired by 1960s and 1970s design and features nostalgic retro detailing to reflect the cubist art and fashion of the time such as the 65-foot-long bar and handblown brass railings and sculptures.

Ultra Supper Club opened in December 2003 following an investment of over Can$3 million by the INK Entertainment owner Charles Khabouth into year-long renovation of the space that previously housed the iconic BamBoo tropical-themed nightclub (co-owned by Richard O'Brien and Patti Habib) from July 1983 until its closing bash on 31 October 2002. Before BamBoo, during the 1970s, the building housed a laundromat and later a Wicker World shop. Khabouth reportedly got alerted that the building was for lease by the same real estate agent who almost 10 years earlier helped him turn RPM and the Warehouse into the Guvernment and Kool Haus. From the start Khabouth envisioned Ultra as an upscale restaurant and club that attracts Toronto's moneyed crowd (real estate barons, Bay Street moguls and leveraged-buyout specialists), much like his successful Stilife club at the corner of Richmond and Duncan Street did back in the late 1980s and early 1990s. In pursuit of creating an exclusive spot, he spared little expense, including putting in fortress-like exterior doors from India that cost Can$15,000 and another Can$15,000 to install them because the entire building had to be reinforced. Run as Khabouth's partnership with Brenda Lowes and inspired by supper clubs in New York City and Montreal, Ultra was among the first Toronto venues to push that concept in addition to being an early adopter of the bottle service model.

The new club attracted visitors, with its rooftop patio frequently crowded during the summer. Sleeker and much more upscale than BamBoo's ramshackle vibe, Ultra put more emphasis on food than a regular nightclub. Instead of live acts, its bookings mostly focused on DJs with the tables and chairs removed around 11pm to make room for dancing. Ultra's glamorous reputation further benefited from the media coverage of the steady stream of international celebrities dropping by such as David Beckham in August 2007, Paris Hilton with then-boyfriend Benji Madden in September 2008, Lindsay Lohan who got paid to show up accompanying then-girlfriend DJ Samantha Ronson in 2009 on the day of their engagement, Beyoncé, etc.

In February 2009, Ultra Supper Club underwent a bit of a makeover, dropping the 'Supper Club' from its name and adopting a new Asian fusion fare and cheaper menu offerings — all of which was seen to be initiated in response to the diminishing number of corporate events at the venue due to the global recession.

By early 2012, despite the club/restaurant being profitable, Khabouth had decided that Ultra ran its course, investing $1.8 million into the venue makeover and re-opening as Cube on 28 February 2012. With the restaurant aspect mostly dropped, Cube functions primarily as a nightclub — hosting glamorous, celebrity-packed TIFF parties and booking more high-profile big room house DJs for gigs such as Dubfire, Hardwell, and Victor Calderone. In August 2013, following that year's OVO Fest the club hosted an impromptu after-party for the festival performers including Drake, Lil Wayne, P. Diddy, Kanye West, Big Sean, French Montana, Mase, and TLC. Cube also continues with the practice of promoting parties around the presence of prominent pro athletes such as Chris Weidman who hosted an event at Cube in September 2013, one day ahead of UFC 165 in Toronto's Air Canada Centre.

==== Dragonfly Nightclub ====
Dragonfly Nightclub is built into the Niagara Fallsview Casino Resort in Niagara Falls, Ontario with a capacity of up to 800. Spread over 12,000 square foot space, it features Asian themed decor invoking an ancient forbidden city.

==== Uniun ====
Uniun opened on Adelaide Street West in November 2012, in the same space that previously housed the Devil's Martini nightclub, a popular destination for bachelorette parties that Khabouth bought several months earlier in July 2012, immediately initiating its complete makeover.

The club was in the news in late August 2013 after Justin Bieber stopped by with bodyguards and got involved in a melee after which he got hustled out by his security detail into a waiting SUV.

==== Toybox ====
Toybox opened on Adelaide Street West in October 2018, a space previously that was Uniun, INK had rebranded this venue to appeal to college students in the hip hop scene, as the EDM scene at Uniun had faded. Toybox features a small teddy bear mascot that runs around the venue to entertain the crowd, and has been facelifted from Uniun to feature a black and red heavy-themed venue.

=== Restaurants ===
==== Spice Route ====
Spice Route is an Asian themed bistro-bar located on King Street West, Toronto, Ontario that opened during spring 2008. It is run as a collaboration between Ink's Khabouth and Liberty's Nick Di Donato (owner of C Lounge and many other venues), two veteran moguls of the Toronto entertainment scene who after directly competing with one another for the city's upscale clientele throughout the 2000s via their respective properties Ultra Supper Club and C Lounge now joined forces in a venture also targeting ritzy young professionals. Spice Route can hold up to 500 guests over multiple rooms and an outdoor patio.

==== La Société ====
La Société is a 1920s-inspired Parisian-style eatery located on Bloor Street West, Toronto, Ontario that opened in June 2011. The restaurant includes two European-style terraces, and an outdoor patio. Located in the space previously occupied by the long-running Dynasty Chinese Cuisine dim sum restaurant, the Can$4 million renovation that included installation of a 20 by 30 foot stained-glass ceiling (courtesy of Toronto's Solarium Design Group) took five months before La Société opened. It also included putting in a mosaic tile floor, which by itself cost almost Can$400,000 and entailed flying in 27 workers. La Société draws inspiration from various brasseries and bistros, including Keith McNally's Balthazar restaurant in New York City's SoHo as well as Hôtel Costes in Paris on Place Vendôme in the city's 1st arrondissement, La Fontaine de Mars in 7th arrondissement, and Brasserie Bofinger in 4th arrondissement.

Due to its location, opulence, and flair, La Société also invoked comparisons to the famous Toronto restaurant Bemelmans, a glamorous eatery owned and operated by Tom Kristenbrun that ran from 1977 until 1994 just up the street at 83 Bloor Street West. La Société opening party on Wednesday, 15 June 2011 brought out the Toronto glitterati from the city's business and media scenes, including Moses Znaimer, Roots Canada founder Michael Budman, architect and designer Dee Dee Taylor Eustace of Taylor Hannah Architect Inc., Kirk Pickersgill and Stephen Wong of Greta Constantine, Blake McGrath, Polly Shannon, Kevin Brauch, Jake Gold, Jian Ghomeshi, Seamus O'Regan, Melissa Grelo, and gossip columnists Shinan Govani, Bernadette Morra, and Suzanne Boyd. Within months of opening, La Société hosted various 2011 Toronto International Film Festival parties, including the closing one on 17 September 2011 that featured NKPR Inc's Natasha Koifman, Bill Nighy, Robert Lantos, Suzanne Rogers, Glenn Baxter, Yannick Bisson, George Stroumboulopoulos, Jian Ghomeshi, Ben Mulroney & Jessica Brownstein, Colin & Justin, Drew & Jonathan Scott, designer Kirk Pickersgill, Suzanne Boyd, and Shinan Govani.

==== Weslodge Saloon ====
Classified as modern American-style gastropub with a saloon twist, Weslodge opened in mid-July 2012 on King Street West in Toronto's Fashion District as a partnership between INK Entertainment's Charles Khabouth and Icon Legacy Hospitality's Hanif Harji. During the Weslodge preparation stage, Khabouth, who was initially set to open it by himself, got introduced to Harji who was opening Patria next door and the two restaurateurs soon decided to go into business together on both venues. The restaurant is located on the ground floor of the Victory Condos building at 478 King Street West that was completed in 2011 and is co-owned by Toronto real estate developers Lifetime Developments (run by Mel Pearl and Sam Herzog) and BLVD Developments.

Designed by the Toronto-based Munge Leung interior design firm, Khabouth's and Harji's plan for Weslodge was attracting the Downtown Toronto urban crowd that doesn't spend much time in their condos, but rather likes to go out right after coming home from work. With its interior featuring imitations of taxidermy hunting trophies mounted on walls, in keeping with the Wild West and hunting themes, the restaurant's bartenders and servers wear gun holsters around their shoulders. Weslodge's kitchen is run by executive chef Stuart Cameron while its first chef du cuisine was Kanida Chey who joined from Claudio Aprile's Origin.

The restaurant was in the news in June 2015 due to its 24-year-old former pastry chef Kate Burnham who had been employed at the venue from July 2012 until January 2014, alleging to have been sexually harassed while working at Weslodge by three former bosses — day sous chef Dan Lidbury, chef du cuisine Kanida Chey, and night sous chef Colin Mercer. She filed an application with the Human Rights Tribunal of Ontario, seeking Can$225,000 in damages as well as formal apologies from each of her alleged harassers. After first appearing in the Toronto Star on Saturday, 13 June 2015, the story got a lot of attention, including from established Toronto restaurateur Jen Agg, owner of the Black Hoof, who in addition to supporting Burnham announced a conference named 'Kitchen Bitches: Smashing the Patriarchy One Plate at a Time'. All the media attention prompted INK Entertainment into releasing an official statement, posted on the company's Facebook page. The story received more national coverage in Canada via The Current radio programme hosted by Anna Maria Tremonti on CBC Radio One, sparking a debate on the poor workplace treatment of women in restaurant kitchens. Jen Agg's Kitchen Bitches conference was later held in Toronto in September 2015. Furthermore, the same month, Burnham's legal case against Weslodge got resolved through mediation as she agreed to a confidential settlement.

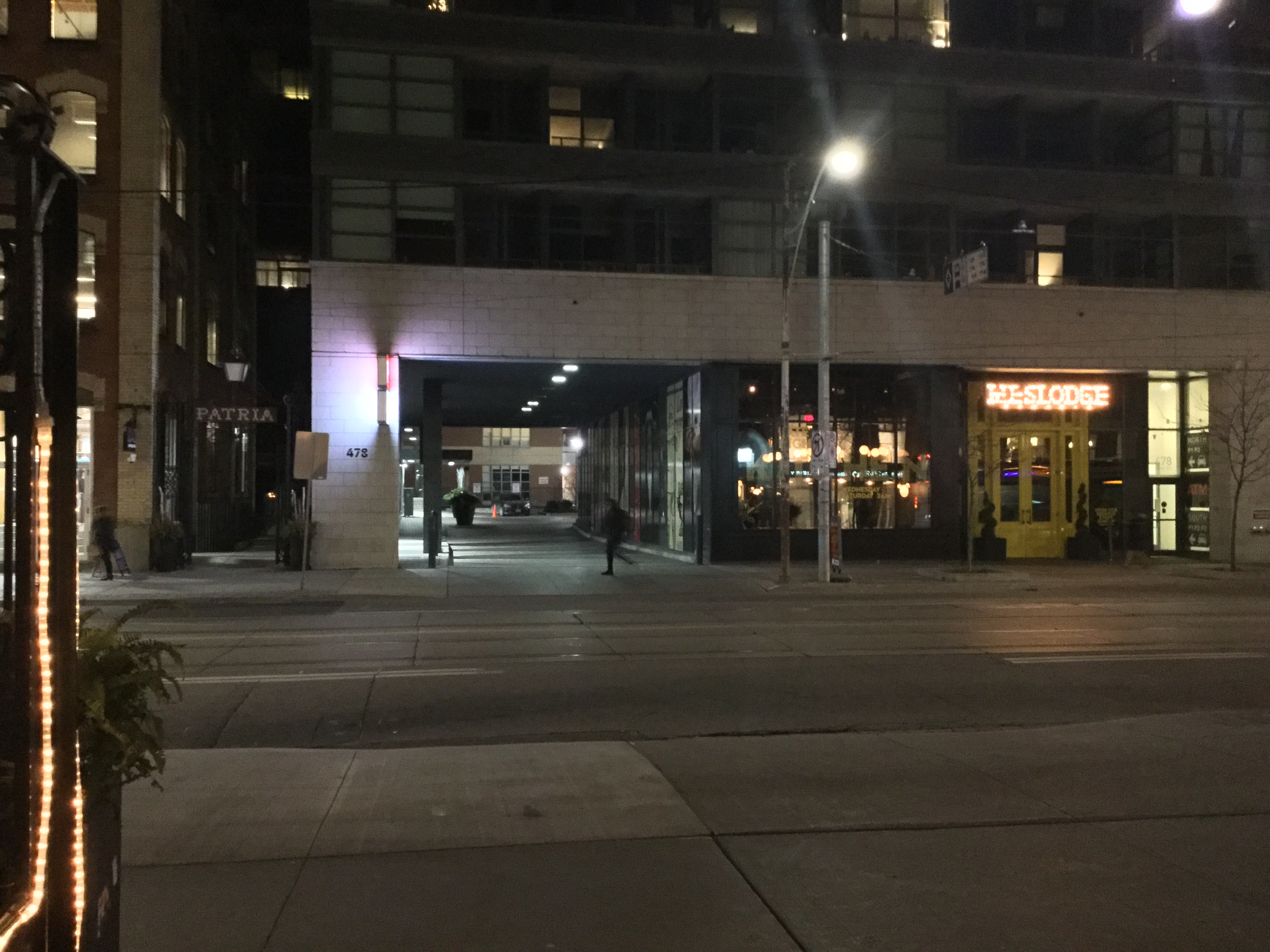
Weslodge and Patria are located in adjacent groundfloor units of the Victory Condos building on King Street West.

Also in September 2015, it was announced that the Weslodge Saloon brand would be expanding to the Gulf countries in early 2016 as part of a deal between Daman Investments PSC, a Dubai-based financial services company, and a consortium of partners including Harji's ICON Legacy Hospitality.

==== Patria ====
Patria is another Khabouth-Harji King West restaurant collaboration, this one serving Spanish food. It opened in October 2012. Originally, only Harji was behind Patria, but soon after meeting Khabouth who was getting ready to open Weslodge next door, the two decided to join forces and run both venues in partnership with one another. Reportedly, they invested Can$2.5 million into getting Patria off the ground, enlisting the Toronto-based Commute Home design company to do the restaurant's interior and getting chefs Stuart Cameron and Claudia Gibson to run the kitchen.

Even before officially opening, the restaurant hosted 2012 TIFF events such as the Seven Psychopaths premiere party in September 2012 with Woody Harrelson, Abbie Cornish, Sam Rockwell, Christopher Walken, and Colin Farrell on hand. Much like other Khabouth's restaurants in Toronto, Patria continually attracts international movie stars and Hollywood celebrities via TIFF parties every September thereby ensuring press coverage and publicity for the restaurant.

==== Buonanotte Toronto ====
The Toronto location of the popular Montreal restaurant Buonanotte opened in January 2013 courtesy of Khabouth's INK Entertainment that licensed the name and recipes from the original restaurant's owner Massimo "Max" Lecas who remains in charge of the new venue's management. It opened at 19 Mercer Street, the same location where Khabouth previously ran a Japanese cuisine restaurant named Ame in partnership with Michael and Guy Rubino. The original Buonanotte restaurant in Montreal has been in continual operation since 1991.

==== Byblos ====
Byblos is a restaurant serving Eastern Mediterranean and Lebanese food, located on Duncan Street near King Street West inside the Storys building in Toronto's Entertainment District. Opened in March 2014, it is the third restaurant that Khabouth established in Toronto in partnership with Hanif Harji.

Originally envisioned as a fish and seafood eatery, its opening took place during a time when Toronto experienced a bit of a spike in restaurants serving Mediterranean and Middle Eastern (Middleterranean) fare, a trend that Khabouth and Harji took note of and decided to join. Most upscale among the string of such spots in Toronto that opened or expanded during the 2013-2014 period (Anthony Rose's Fat Pasha, Dr. Laffa, Me Va Me, District Oven, S. Lefkowitz, etc.), Byblos focuses on dishes from Greece, Turkey, Palestinian, and Lebanon as well as Morocco. Byblos' executive chef is Stuart Cameron who also oversees other Khabouth-Harji eateries such as Weslodge and Patria while its chef de cuisine is Jennifer Nickle who came over from Patria where she was a sous chef.

Byblos received near universal critical acclaim, getting enthusiastic reviews and accolades for its food blend and becoming perhaps the best-reviewed Khabouth restaurant ever.

As Byblos got established on Toronto's restaurant scene and following the successful launch of its second location in Miami Beach, it was announced in September 2015 that the Byblos brand would be expanding to the Gulf countries in early 2016 as part of a deal between Daman Investments PSC, a Dubai-based financial services company, and a consortium of partners including Harji's ICON Legacy Hospitality.

==== America Restaurant ====
First opening its doors in early September 2014 for that year's TIFF, high-end America Restaurant at the 31st floor of Toronto's Trump International Hotel and Tower didn't officially launch until almost October 2014. It thus replaced the glitzy Stock approximately nine months since its management had been taken over by Oliver & Bonacini Restaurants (O&B) in partnership with Khabouth. At the time of the ownership change, Stock, which opened during spring 2012 simultaneous with the Toronto Trump Tower's launch, had been in operation for some two and a half years.

After their limited collaboration on snacks at the Cabana Pool Bar, America Restaurant thus marked a closer partnership between INK and O&B that began in December 2013 with an announcement of the two companies taking over all food operations at Trump International Hotel & Tower from Alex Shnaider's Talon International that developed the tower and then later also managed its two dining and drinking venues — Stock restaurant and Suits Lobby Lounge.

The new owners hired the Toronto firm II by IV Design, the same company that designed Stock, to now remodel the space. The redesign included doing away with Stock's black leather furniture, which Khabouth described as very "manly", and replacing it with "a lot of velvet, a lot of velures, burgundies, blues and golds in order to make it a little more feminine friendly". Hundreds of pieces of furniture were custom built off-site at a shop in Woodbridge, just outside Toronto, over the course of about four months. The actual remodeling work took place in late August and early September 2014 over just five days as the new owners rushed to be ready in time for Toronto International Film Festival. While Stock's physical bar remained relatively unchanged, the lounge area was completely revamped with new lighting, furniture and a DJ booth.

The spot relaunched as America Restaurant, a venue that's an eatery during daytime, but on Thursdays, Fridays, and Saturdays functions as a supper club, turning into a nightclub with dancing and DJs past 11pm. When it came to the name, O&B and INK wanted "something strong and unapologetic" while for Khabouth, Donald Trump himself, "the epitome of everything American", was a source of inspiration. Bill Osborne, formerly of Bar Boulud in London and Canoe in Toronto, got hired to run America's kitchen, working under O&B executive chef Anthony Walsh.

In September 2014, before it was even open to the general public, America hosted The Imitation Game party attended by Benedict Cumberbatch and Keira Knightley as the movie played at the 2014 Toronto International Film Festival.

In late November 2014 America was subject of an extremely negative review by The Globe and Mail restaurant critic Chris Nuttall-Smith whose elaborate takedown went viral, garnering big reader reaction as well as attention from various other media outlets. In his zero-star assessment of America, Nutall-Smith referred to it as "tacky, new-money restaurant", eviscerating its bouncers, wait staff, bathroom attendant, hostesses, and even patrons; though praising its food. The scathing review reportedly led to the restaurant's entire front of house staff getting fired.

America received a four-star rating from the 2015 Forbes Travel Guide, placed in the same category as established Toronto dining spots Café Boulud Toronto, Canoe, One Restaurant, Scaramouche, Splendido, and TOCA.

The restaurant was in the news in late March 2015 after a Toronto resident (Darshan Dorka) claimed he got turned away at America along with a party of friends due to wearing turbans.

==== NAO ====
Standing for New and Old, NAO is an Asian steakhouse on Avenue Road established by Khabouth and Harji that opened in November 2014.

==== Byblos Miami ====
After getting announced in January 2015, Byblos Miami, an offshoot of Toronto's Byblos, opened in Miami Beach during late summer 2015. Another partnership between Khabouth and Harji, the Miami restaurant reportedly came on the heels of extensive research as the duo of Toronto restaurateurs aimed at minimizing surprises and risks of launching in the Miami market that they don't know very well.

==== Figo ====
Opened in November 2015, Figo is the seventh Khabouth-Harji restaurant collaboration, their sixth in Toronto. Located on the south-west corner of Adelaide West & John in the recently built Pinnacle on Adelaide condo building that's owned by Pinnacle International, the eatery serves Italian cuisine. The partners hired Anna Chen (formerly of Lee and Scaramouche) to run Figo's kitchen as its executive chef.

=== Other ===
==== Storys building ====
In October 2011 Khabouth and Harji announced their purchase of the four-story Storys building at the corner of Duncan & Pearl in the heart of the Entertainment District, around the corner from Royal Alexandra Theater and TIFF Lightbox.

==== Cabana Pool Bar ====
After his 2012 takeover of the Sound Academy, Khabouth opened Cabana Pool Bar on 15 June 2013 on its patio. Spending Can$5 million, he hired Ink's go-to interior designers Munge Leung to remake the outdoor space by installing 12 poolside white-tent cabanas and several dozen tables and couches all in an effort of appealing to the "25-plus crowd that has traveled to the south of France, been to Miami, been to Vegas".

With a daytime concept that's an extension of the bottle-service booths in Khabouth's nightclubs — the cost of renting a table, a couch, or a cabana for an entire day is from Can$1,000 to Can$2,500, an amount for which the patrons also get three bottles of liquor to start, a platter of snacks, and wristbands affording access to 10-20 people — Cabana Pool Bar became a big success right away, attracting more than 4,000 people a day on summer weekends if the weather is nice. Open during summer only from early to mid June until late September, Cabana shuts down by 11pm on weekends due to the residents of the neighbouring Toronto Island complaining about the noise from the patio. The venue is closed to the general public during summer weekdays though it is available for corporate bookings and functions. Light food offerings and snacks at the venue are handled by Oliver & Bonacini Restaurants, a Toronto-based hospitality company.

Celebrity presence, a staple of Khabouth's nightclubs and restaurants, played a large part in Cabana Pool Bar's initial promotion as well — Justin Bieber, Drake, Milos Raonic, deadmau5, P. K. Subban, Phil Kessel, and Nazem Kadri were all on hand during its first summer in operation. Over the coming summers, Will Smith, in town filming Suicide Squad, Dan Bilzerian, LeBron James, etc. made highly publicized appearances.

=== Bisha Hotel & Residences ===
Bisha Hotel & Residences at 80 Blue Jays Way in Toronto's Entertainment District is a hotel and condominium project, currently under construction, executed as a joint venture between INK Entertainment hospitality company and Lifetime Developments real estate development company. It is a new private label hotel and residence brand named after INK founder, Charles Khabouth's childhood nickname, Bisha. It was designed by award-winning Wallman Architects and Munge Leung Design Associates and will stand 41 stories tall when complete. The Bisha Presentation Centre has hosted many events including features by Sir Richard Branson and John Legend.

== Events ==
=== Veld Music Festival ===
Veld Music Festival
- Genre: Electronic music,
- Locations: Toronto, Ontario
- Years active: 2012-present
- Founders: INK Entertainment

Veld Music Festival takes place over a two-day weekend at Downsview Park in Toronto, Ontario. Organized annually by INK Entertainment.

The inaugural event took place on 4 and 5 August 2012, featuring some of the best stars and labels in electronic dance music. The inaugural headliners included deadmau5 and Avicii; the 2013 festival was headlined by deadmau5 and Above & Beyond. In 2014, the headliners were Calvin Harris, Armin van Buuren, and Iggy Azalea. Veld has featured performances by Oliver Heldens, Nero, Ingrosso, What So Not, DVBBS, Zedd, and Knife Party.

On 2 August 2015, the 2015 Veld festival of was cancelled due to a severe thunder storm warning.

==== Controversy ====
The 2014 festival had two drug-related deaths — 20-year-old Annie Le of Toronto and 22-year-old Willard Amurao from the Greater Toronto Area, both of whom died after ingesting recreational drugs they had bought at the two-day event — as well as additional thirteen drug-related illnesses. Questions were raised about the circumstances of Amurao's death, prompting a Special Investigations Unit (Ontario's police watchdog) investigation due to him apparently being handcuffed by a Toronto police officer before receiving medical help. The police officer reportedly approached him after seeing him being carried by two men at which point the 22-year-old reportedly became violent and needed to be handcuffed. A month later, the Special Investigations Unit closed its investigation, concluding that Toronto police had "nothing to do" with Amurao's death, further stating the man was helped to an emergency medical area where he began to convulse and flail "violently," and his movements prevented paramedics from treating him at which point a Toronto police officer handcuffed the man's hands to a stretcher so he could be treated while his one hand was later freed so that medication could be given to him. The SIU report also states the man was subsequently rushed to hospital and went into cardiac arrest en route at which point his remaining handcuffs were removed and the ambulance stopped, but he could not be revived by paramedics or hospital staff.

In reaction to the deaths, Toronto city councilor Giorgio Mammoliti released a statement saying festival organizers INK Entertainment, and INK chief executive Charles Khabouth were partially responsible for the deaths, "due to their negligence and poor security measures". Mammoliti's statement additionally blamed fellow councilors Gord Perks and Mike Layton for the deaths. Through its lawyer James Zibarras, INK Entertainment immediately demanded full retraction from Mammoliti, threatening legal action if one is not issued within 48 hours. On late Friday afternoon, 8 August 2014, almost a full day after the deadline set by INK's lawyer, Mammoliti formally retracted his earlier statement that blamed Khabouth and INK; the company didn't pursue legal action.

With its investigation focusing on party drugs from the very beginning, the Toronto police homicide squad investigation whose findings were announced almost a year later in late July 2015 concluded that the two drug-related deaths were accidental. The police also announced plans of installing so-called "amnesty boxes" at the 2015 Veld where attendees can deposit drugs without any legal consequences. The 2015 edition of Veld was subsequently cancelled due to a severe thunder storm warning.

== Former assets ==
=== Stilife ===
Stilife was an upscale Toronto nightclub that ran from 1987 until 1995 in a 1920s six-storey brick building at the southwest corner of Richmond and Duncan Streets. Opening in October 1987 in the building's basement with a dirt floor, it was run in very hands-on fashion by young entrepreneur Charles Khabouth who leased the 6,000 square foot space at an extremely cheap rate of Can$4 per square foot. Despite being located in a then-deserted part of Toronto's former Garment District, Stilife quickly managed to develop an image of exclusivity, becoming a favourite hangout for Toronto's posh crowd. The club was populated by attractive, well-heeled patrons that had to pass a strict door policy designed to attract glamorous, high-income clientele.

Soon after opening Stilife, Khabouth sold Club Z, a Yonge and Wellesley area club that was his first entrepreneurial effort in the hospitality industry, in order to fully concentrate on his ambitious new venue. In complete contrast to Club Z that was open to anyone who wanted to dance, Khabouth went out of his way to make every single aspect of Stilife exclusive. The goal was attracting a more mature, sophisticated, and free-spending urban crowd rather than settling for suburban youth that many downtown Toronto clubs catered to at the time. Inspired by the look of the recently opened Diamond club at Sherbourne Street whose interior differed significantly from the standard brass-and-mirrors decor of the numerous clubs in the city, Khabouth devoted particular attention to his new venue's interior design. He hired Toronto-based Yabu Pushelberg design studio (consisting of George Yabu and Glenn Pushelberg who would go on to achieve international renown, but were still largely unknown outside of the city) to come up with ideas for the club's interior. They traveled to New York City for inspiration, ending up with dark, sculptured aesthetic and edgy, industrial design, which featured a heavy use of polished steel, concrete, and mosaic tile. The chain walls created by long chains hanging off the club's ceiling were a particularly big draw. Furthermore, Stilife's core interior elements referenced Art Deco, Salvador Dalí, and Blade Runner.

In addition to attracting the rich of Toronto, Stilife soon gained a reputation as a celebrity hangout with notable guests such as Madonna (dropped by in late May 1990 during her Blond Ambition World Tour), George Michael, and Prince further fueling its success and enhancing its status.

In terms of the music played, Stilife covered a wide range of sounds and themed nights. Many Toronto DJs worked the venue, but two left their mark especially — Richard Vermeulen who was the resident on Tuesdays for most of the club's run and JC Sunshine whose residency was Fridays. Vermeulen particularly proved adept at combining genres, spinning an eclectic mix that covered the range from Ted Nugent's "Stranglehold" over to James Brown, disco, funk, and hard rock, until Bomb the Bass' "Beat Dis", Eric B. & Rakim's "Paid in Full", and Baby Ford's "Oochy Coochy". DJ Mark Oliver joined Stilife in 1990 after the closure of Tazmanian Ballroom and became resident on Mondays that were popular with voguing gay men; for Oliver this marked the beginning of a long collaboration with Khabouth and Ink that would later continue in his other clubs.

By early 1990s numerous new nightclubs opened along Richmond Street West and Adelaide Street West as well as in adjoining streets within the area bound by Front St., Queen Street West, Bathurst St., and Simcoe St. all of which was a consequence of low rent in the said area and Khabouth's success with Stilife there. Among them were: Go-Go (a three-level superclub opened by the Ballinger brothers in 1990 across the street from Stilife at the north-west corner of Richmond & Duncan), 23 Hop (a minimalist all-ages club opened by Wesley Thuro during summer 1990 in a warehouse down the street from Stilife at 318 Richmond that would soon become a catalyst for the Toronto rave scene), Venus, Klub Max (a huge venue started in 1990 by Nick DiDonato and Angelo Belluz in a heritage building on Peter St. just south of King Street West that previously housed DiDonato's P.M. Toronto sports bar and restaurant), LimeLight (in 1993 by businessman Zisi Konstantinou at 250 Adelaide Street West near the corner with Duncan Street), My Apartment (a club in an old shoe factory building at 81 Peter Street playing Top 40 music), and Club 606. At the same time, Khabouth for his part attempted, and mostly failed, to expand into fine dining with his involvement in several restaurants — Boa Cafe, Oceans, Acrobat, and Bellair Cafe — quickly ending, either via him pulling out of the venture or the venues folding. Most of those restaurants were in the Yorkville upscale neighbourhood where in 1992 he also opened Skorpio nightclub that closed by 1994. In late 1995 after eight years of successful operation, Khabouth sold Stilife, describing the decision as being motivated by his desire to expand and the inability to do so at the Richmond and Duncan location due to space, capacity, and ceiling height constraints.

Right away in 1995, Fluid nightclub opened at the location vacated by Stilife. The new club was also successful, continuing until 2009 including a slight mid-2000s makeover and re-branding as Fluid Lounge. In February 2010 Pop Nightclub opened in the same location, but folded quickly. Over the coming decades Khabouth has occasionally organized one-off Stilife retro parties in Toronto under the 'A Return To Stilife' moniker.

=== Oceans ===
In late 1989, emboldened by the rapid success of his Stilife nightclub, 27-year-old Charles Khabouth opened Oceans restaurant in the same building as a companion piece, attempting to transfer some of the nightclub's sexy upscale vibe into the dining setting. He recruited celebrity chef Greg Couillard and the restaurant even got featured on the Lifestyles of the Rich and Famous TV show. However, things quickly started to unravel and by July 1990 Couillard quit, taking most of the kitchen staff with him. His replacement was Susur Lee, another high-profile chef, but he only lasted a few weeks. The restaurant got merged into Stilife by year's end.

The high-profile failure of Oceans got Khabouth a bit of a tarnished reputation on the Toronto entertainment scene that followed him in various forms throughout subsequent decades as far as his involvement with dining is concerned — the charge that food is secondary in his restaurants. Joanne Kates, The Globe and Mail food critic at the time, claimed "Khabouth never intended the food to be important at Oceans", further stating that the restaurant imploded "once he realized he couldn't run it as a club and efficiently make money". Khabouth identified the inability of celebrity chefs to subordinate as the main reason for Oceans failure: "I had a hard time working with some of these chefs. With celebrity chefs, it's like you work for them".

=== Boa Café ===
Opened in Yorkville in October 1989 as a collaboration between Khabouth (at the time owner of successful upscale nightclub Stilife) and fellow young Lebanese-Canadian Rony Hitti, Boa Café was a venue that brought fine dining and club culture together.

Hitti, who studied finance and politics at York University while DJing at various Toronto clubs during the 1980s befriended Khabouth at Stilife. Traveling to Montreal together, the two went to a place called Lola's Paradise and thought Toronto could use a similar venue — a late-night dining spot catering to the Stilife crowd that had very few eating options after the 1 a.m. last call. They found a spot at 25 Bellair Street that previously housed a daytime coffee shop and after extensive renovations opened Boa Café to much fanfare in October 1989 as 50/50 partners. Chic and trendy, Boa served food and drinks from noon until late night five days a week. Though the venue received plenty of positive notices in local press, it faced financial problems in its first year. These issues coincided with the problems Khabouth was experiencing with Stilife due to the Oceans restaurant that he opened as an adjoining piece in the same building. The relationship between Hitti and Khabouth soured and by 1991 the two decided to go their separate ways.

Hitti took over the venue, reorganized it by making it more focused on food than drinking. It continued running with much success until 1998.

=== Acrobat ===
Despite his continued success with Stilife nightclub in the late 1980s and early 1990s, Khabouth experienced trouble expanding into the dining aspect of the hospitality industry with his involvement in two high-profile restaurants - Boa Café and Oceans - quickly turning sour.

Almost immediately, Khabouth jumped into another high-profile project, again in Yorkville, but this time in partnership with established Toronto restaurateur Franco Prevedello. Following numerous delays and Can$1.4 million in renovations, they opened Acrobat in June 1992 at 1221 Bay Street, catering to upscale Yorkville clientele with a restaurant-nightclub hybrid. However, their relationship quickly soured and Khabouth got out of the venture the same year, selling his share to Prevedello. Apparently, they weren't seeing eye to eye due to Khabouth wanting to make Acrobat a supper club where people dined and danced while Prevedello was only interested in the dining part. The restaurant continued under Prevedello until 1994.

=== Bellair Café ===
The famous Bellair Café in Yorkville at 100 Cumberland St. had been closed for four years when Khabouth decided to revive it in 1995. It first opened in 1981 under the ownership of famous Toronto restaurateur and nightclub owner Tom Kristenbrun who had by this time already been involved with the El Mocambo live music venue and the upscale Bemelmans restaurant. Like Bemelmans, Kristenbrun's other fine dining Yorkville menu, nearby Bellair Café also became a place to see and be seen, attracting local stars like Bryan Adams as well as visiting celebrities such as Bruce Willis, Richard Gere, and Robert Altman, especially during The Festival of Festivals (later renamed the Toronto International Film Festival). The celebrity practice of starting the evening off with a cocktail party at Bellair Café before going to their movie's gala opening and afterwards winding up at The Copa nightclub for dancing became well established at the festival.

In 1991, Kristenbrun, who in the meantime opened and established additional lucrative fine dining properties such as Rhodes near Yonge & St. Clair and Bistro 990 on Bay & Wellesley, got out of the Bellair Café venture and the venue closed.

In 1995, Khabouth (who had already established himself as the owner of influential Stilife nightclub and was in the process of taking over the RPM nightclub, but nevertheless also had a recent string of failed fine dining ventures) decided to try again by resuscitating the famous Bellair Café at the same spot. Staying with the same upscale concept, Bellair under Khabouth continued to attract celebrities as well as movie industry movers and shakers such as Harvey Weinstein. It closed less than two years later in 1997, this time for good. Right away, a new restaurant, Sassafraz, opened at Bellair's spot and also went on to become very popular.

=== The Guvernment / Kool Haus complex ===
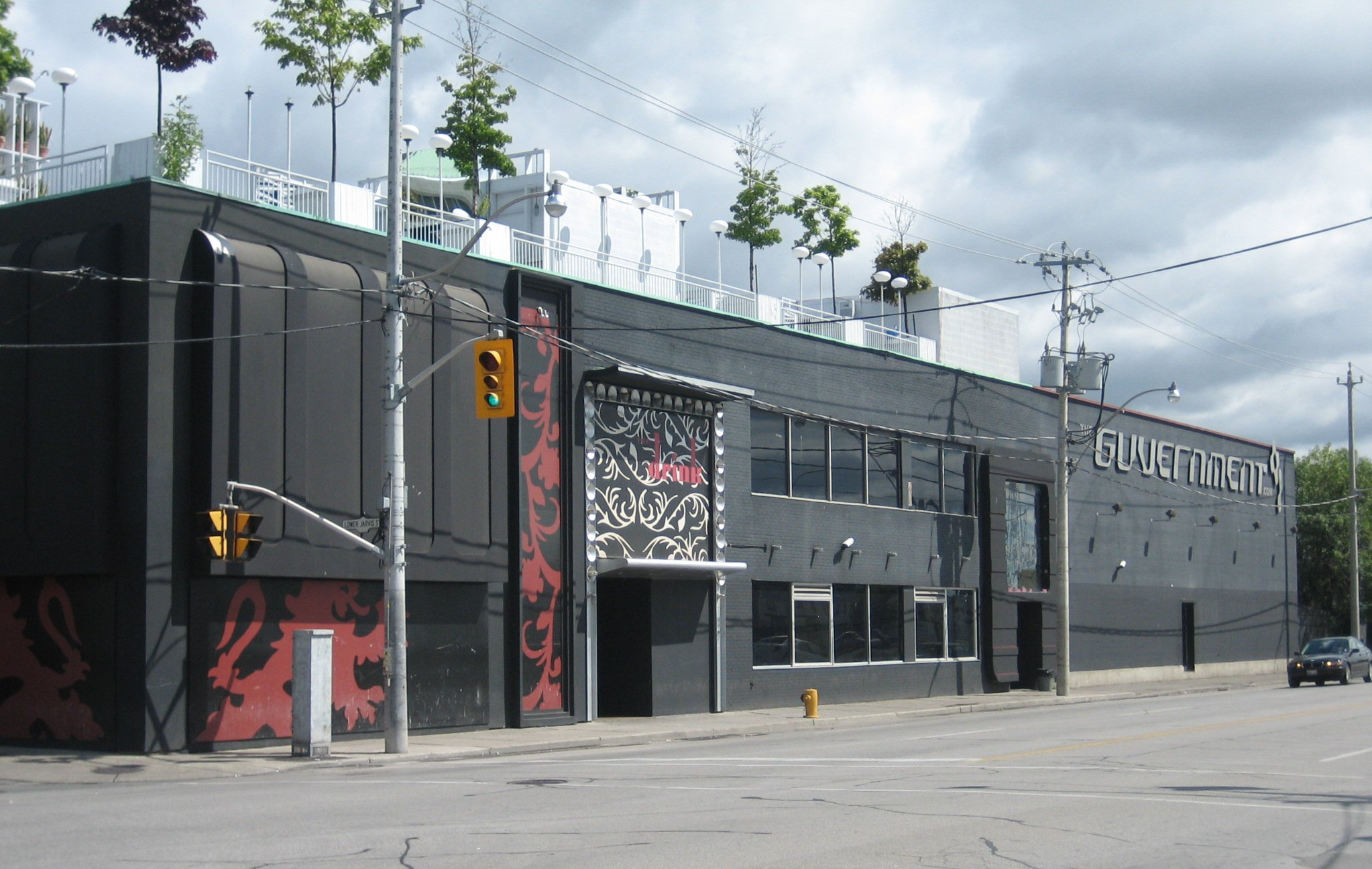
The Guvernment in July 2007.

The Guvernment was the name of a nightclub complex in Toronto, Ontario, Canada. Opened in 1996, it was incarnated from the former RPM nightclub, which closed its doors after ten years at the same location. Kool Haus was often used as a venue for concerts and live performances. In 2008, The Guvernment was voted #8 nightclub in the world in DJMag's Top 100 Clubs. Additional concept rooms included Haven, The Gallery, Surface, Chroma and the rooftop patio, Skybar. The complex was located directly across from Lake Ontario, in downtown Toronto. The Guvernment / KoolHaus complex was Canada’s largest and longest running entertainment complex, with a capacity of over 5000. This complex hosted Tiësto, Coldplay, Deadmau5, Avicii, Afrojack, Bob Dylan, Lady Gaga, David Guetta, Common, N.E.R.D, The Black Eyed Peas, Armin Van Buuren, and many more over the years. Popular events held in this complex included Decadence and Labour of Love.

The Guvernment and Koolhaus Entertainment Complex closed its doors on January 31, 2015 and is expected to be replaced by a mixed-use project.

=== Ame ===
Japanese cuisine restaurant Ame opened in September 2009 on 19 Mercer Street in the Toronto Entertainment District as a collaboration between Khabouth and the Rubino brothers (Michael and Guy) at the spot where the Rubinos had previously for almost ten years co-owned and operated Rain, a club-like pan-Asian restaurant. Rain closed down in January 2009 for modest renovations as the Rubinos planned on adding a sushi and sashimi bar and quickly re-opening. However, in the meantime, they went into business with Ink's Charles Khabouth who convinced them to completely change up the concept. The venue thus re-opened with a new name (Ame), new concept (high end Japanese food), new completely renovated space, and Khabouth as the new business partner.

In October 2010, Ame held a lavish one-year anniversary party. In June 2011 a re-zoning application was submitted to the City of Toronto from a real estate developer wishing to build a residential condominium building on the plot currently occupied by two old buildings, specifically units from 15 to 35 Mercer Street including Ame at the time. The application was eventually rejected.

Ame closed in August 2011 with Michael Rubino attributing its failure to a "difference in vision" between him and Khabouth. After renovations that lasted through the second part of 2012, Khabouth opened Buonanotte at the same location in January 2013 as a licensed offshoot of the eponymous Montreal restaurant.

=== Briscola Trattoria ===
Briscola opened in February 2011 at 501 College St. near Palmerston Boulevard in Little Italy as a collaboration between Khabouth and Syrian-born Toufik Sarwa at the same spot where Sarwa's short-lived Cinq 01 previously operated.

However, Briscola also turned out to have very short lifespan, closing in 2012. By June 2012 Mexican restaurant La Carnita co-owned by Andrew Richmond and Amin Todai opened in its spot.

=== The Cocktail Parlor at Storys ===
After getting introduced to one another in 2011, Ink's Charles Khabouth and Icon Legacy's Hanif Harji forged a business collaboration that began with their October 2011 purchase of the Storys building and continued by opening two restaurants on King West in 2012 — Weslodge Saloon and Patria. By summer 2013 they were ready to launch yet another joint venue — The Cocktail Parlor at Storys, a cocktail lounge on the second floor of the building they acquired almost two years prior.

Inspired by a bar called The Aviary in Chicago, The Cocktail Parlour featured an extensive 60-cocktail menu along with snacks overseen by executive chef Stuart Cameron who simultaneously performed the same duties at Weslodge and Patria, the other two Khabouth-Harji venues at the time along with decor that referenced the prohibition era as well as 1920s and 1930s in general. With its opening timed for the 2013 Toronto International Film Festival, The Cocktail Parlor hosted numerous celebrity parties in its first month of operation.

With the March 2014 launch of Byblos restaurant on the Storys building ground floor, The Cocktail Parlor soon closed permanently.

=== Product ===
Product, previously known as This is London until late 2012, was a multilevel nightclub featuring numerous bars, various private lounges, and a ladies spa all with a capacity of 1,200 people. It was set in a renovated 1936 warehouse at 364 Richmond Street West near the corner of Richmond West & Peter in Toronto's Entertainment District.

The 364 Richmond West building first got converted into a nightclub in 2000. After four years of operation, the venue got acquired by INK Entertainment in 2004. Having gone through several names already, the nightlife venue eventually became known as This is London. INK's idea for the offering of This is London was combining electronic music with Toronto's mid-to-late 2000s upscale scene. To that end, a steady stream of celebrities including Paris Hilton, Jon Jones, Michael Sorrentino, Usher, Kardinal Offishall, etc. came through the club's doors. On the musical side, Fridays at the club, billed as Soho Fridays, proved popular — featuring numerous house music acts such as Deniz Koyu, Kaskade, Moby, DJ AM, Chus & Ceballos, Morgan Page, Mark Knight, Fedde le Grand, Steve Aoki, Carl Cox, Benny Benassi, etc.

By late 2012, This is London re-branded to Product.

From mid 2014, Barcode, night spot with capacity of 450 people, opened on the upper level of Product nightclub. Product closed in late May 2015 with the remaining parties moved to the Polson Pier complex, specifically the Solarium venue that was for these occasions billed as Barcode by the Lake. The reason for Product's closing had to do with the overall trend of residential condos and office buildings being built in the area; after the 364 Richmond West building found itself next to a commercial and office space, the building's landlord offered to buy the nightclub out of its remaining lease.

=== Città ===
In December 2014, Città opened in the CityPlace neighbourhood as a three-way partnership between INK's Khabouth, ICON's Harji, and Adam Brown, the owner of Fox & Fiddle pub franchise in Toronto. Located on the ground floor of a Concord Pacific condo tower at 92 Fort York Blvd and serving casual Italian cuisine, the owners' initial idea was to treat the 80-seat venue with a 100-person patio as a base to be grown over time into a franchise with a possible second location at Adelaide West & John already under construction. They hired Ben Heaton who previously worked at Claudio Aprile's Colborne Lane and Mark McEwan's ONE to be Città's first executive chef. The partners also brought on David Mattachioni, a 14-year veteran of the Terroni company, to train the staff and run Città's pizza oven as well as head baker Carlo Lazzarino also of Terroni.

Early reviews focused on Città's decor being more modest than other "luxe, spare-no-expense design" Khabouth-Harji eateries and its food not being top-notch when compared with "Old World cooking throughout the city". The restaurant tried to generate some buzz by hosting promotions such as a September 2015 pop-up from prominent Brooklyn hipster pizzeria Roberta's, however, Città continually struggled for patrons compared to other CityPlace neighbourhood eateries like Hunter's Landing. With the same trio of Khabouth, Harji, and Brown opening Figo in November 2015 at Adelaide West & John, site once touted as Città's potential second location, Città's days looked to be numbered. The restaurant closed in late December 2015 with further news about its owners hiring chef Guillermo Herbertson of Barsa Taberna to develop a new Mexican-inspired restaurant concept for an April 2016 opening at the same location focusing largely on inexpensive snack and finger foods.

=== Tattoo ===
Tattoo, previously known as Tattoo Queen West and Tattoo Rock Parlour, was a nightclub and live performance venue.

It opened in December 2007 as Tattoo Rock Parlour via INK's partnership with Nick Di Donato's Liberty Entertainment Group and King Street tattoo shop Black Line Studios. Its co-owners Khabouth and Di Donato reportedly spent Can$2.5 million on renovating the space before the launch. Initially advertised as Canada's only tattoo parlor and bar, Tattoo included a two-level event space that could hold over 400 people. Compared to other Queen West rock clubs such as Velvet Underground and the longstanding Bovine Sex Club, Tattoo was going more for designer décor. Its location at 567 Queen Street West was previously, from 1993 until 2004, occupied by the Di Donato-owned Left Bank nightclub (with Crystal Room lounge bar inside it).

Initially, Tattoo offered a food menu with items ranging from mac-and-cheese to steak.

Shifting between live bands and DJ nights, Tattoo has hosted live performances from the likes of Dragonette (performed the 2008 New Year's concert on 31 December 2007), The Killers, Nickelback, Broken Social Scene (performed on 24 September 2008 as part of the inaugural Verge Music Awards), and M.I.A. (performed on 3 May 2014 as part of Canadian Music Week). Additionally, it welcomed various celebrities via either event after parties or paid appearances such as Avril Lavigne, Gene Simmons (hosted a party on 14 September 2010 during TIFF), Drew Barrymore (attended Whip It after-party on 13 September 2009), and Slash (stopped by with bodyguards and partied on 10 September 2010 as part of a paid appearance following a live concert at Kool Haus, another one of Khabouth's venues).

INK sold the venue during spring 2016.

== See also ==
- List of electronic music festivals
