= La Société (restaurant) =

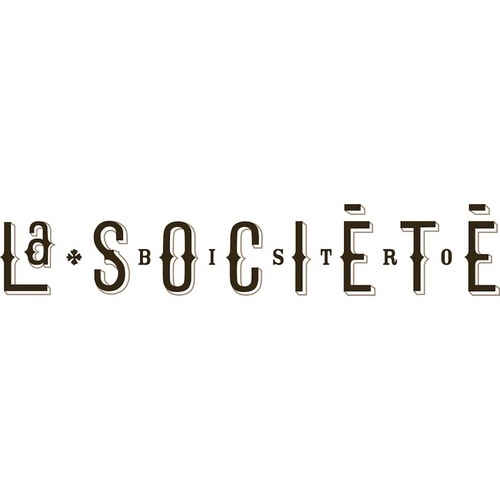
- Interactive map of La Société

Restaurant information
- Established: June 15, 2011; 15 years ago
- Closed: December 31, 2019; 6 years ago
- Owner: INK Entertainment
- Chef: Toronto location: James Olberg (2011–2013); Romain Avril (2014–2016); Ben Heaton (2016–2019); Montreal location: Jean-Philippe Miron (2015–2021)
- Food type: French
- Location: 131 Bloor Street West, Toronto, Ontario, Canada
- Coordinates: 43.6687°N 79.3925°W
- Other locations: Montreal
- Website: lasociete.ca

La Société was a restaurant located on the Mink Mile on Bloor Street, Toronto, Ontario, Canada. It was a French Bistro operated by INK Entertainment and owned by Danny Soberano and Charles Khabouth. The restaurant opened on June 15, 2011.

The restaurant closed permanently on New Year's Eve 2019.

== Design ==
The 1920s Parisian bistro theme of La Société's interior design was done by Munge Leung. It featured hand painted windows, burgundy velvet walls, marble floors, a full raw bar and a multi-level, outdoor patio. The restaurant in total was able seat more than 300.

== Expansion ==
By late 2012, Khabouth announced plans of opening La Société in Montreal.

The expansion of La Société to Montreal stemmed from INK Entertainment's broader strategy to combine dining, nightlife, and hospitality within boutique hotels. Seeking a partnership to execute this vision, INK's Charles Khabouth collaborated with Loews Hotels, whose executives encouraged him to gain hotel experience outside Toronto. This led to the opening of a second La Société location in Montreal's Loews Hôtel Vogue, marking the start of INK's partnership with Loews Hotels.

The Montreal location closed in mid-2021.
