= The Guvernment =

Demolished nightclub in Toronto, Canada

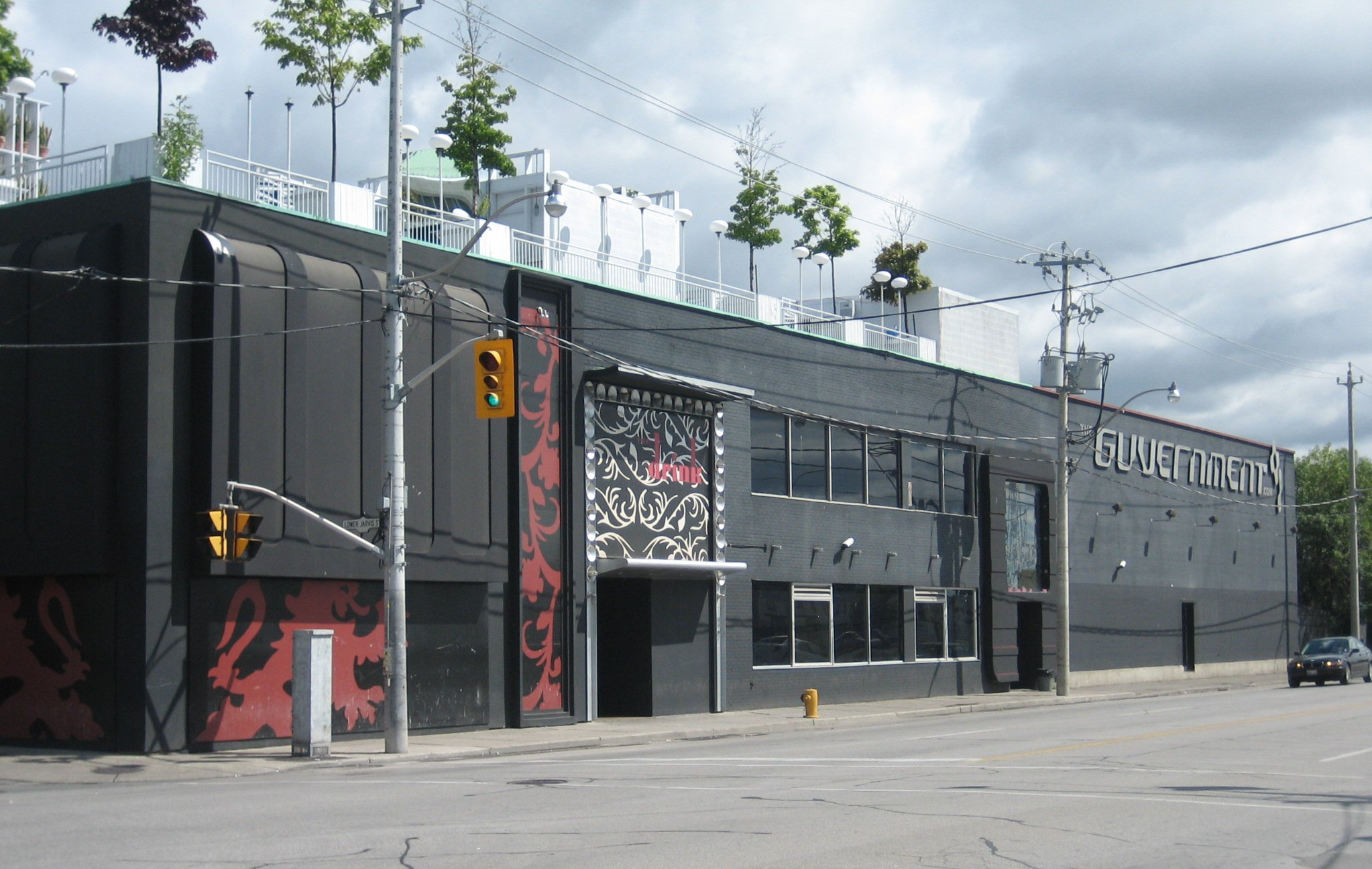
- The Guvernment's south side exterior in July 2007 (main entrance was on east side).
- Interactive map of The Guvernment
- Former names: Fresh (1984–1985); RPM (1985–1995)
- Location: Toronto, Ontario, Canada
- Coordinates: 43.644212°N 79.368804°W
- Owner: INK Entertainment
- Capacity: The Guvernment (3,000); Kool Haus (2,500); Entire Complex (10,000+)

Construction
- Opened: 1984 (as Fresh); December 1985 (as RPM); September 1996 (as The Guvernment)
- Renovated: 2007
- Closed: 25 January 2015
- Demolished: February 2015

The Guvernment, formerly known as RPM, was a nightclub complex in Toronto, Ontario, Canada. It was also the name of one of the two main performance venues within the complex. The other venue was Kool Haus (formerly The Warehouse). Other smaller rooms within the complex included: The Drink (renovated to become Cathouse then Surface), D'Luxe Lounge (renovated to become Haven), The Orange Room (renovated to become Chroma), SkyBar, Charlies (renovated to become Gallery), Tanja and Acid Lounge. The Guvernment opened in 1996 and closed in early 2015. The Kool Haus venue became known for hosting the first ever concert performance by Canadian rapper and singer Drake.

Prior to closure, the property was sold to The Daniels Corporation real estate development company and is since March 2015 in the process of being turned into C$700 million condominium development called City of the Arts.

== History ==
=== Fresh ===
The site of the Guvernment was first converted into a nightclub in 1984 as Fresh Restaurant and Nightclub by Tony and Albert Assoon, two of the four Assoon brothers who had simultaneously been running the successful and influential Twilight Zone after-hours club at 185 Richmond Street West in Toronto's Entertainment District. However, Fresh did not do well and was quickly sold by late 1985.

=== RPM ===
The space returned almost immediately as RPM under the ownership of Murray Ball, an artist who had formerly fronted the Toronto-based punk/new-wave band The Dishes before turning to hospitality entrepreneurship on the Toronto nightlife scene having successfully run The Copa in Yorkville on behalf of its owner – Tom Kristenbrun's Chrysalis Group. Joining Ball in the new RPM ownership group were Martin Arts, formerly The Copa's original general manager, and Neil Vosburgh.

Within a few months, by March 1986, well known local DJs Terry "TK" Kelly and Chris Sheppard were brought over from The Copa to be RPM's residents. Initially, TK played Mondays (billed as 'Psychedelic Mondays'), Thursdays ('Disco Thursdays'), and Saturdays ('dance‐music Saturdays' blending house, funk, and new wave), while Sheppard was hired away from his popular alt-rock Sunday-night gig at The Copa to recreate the same energy at RPM. TK's Monday nights quickly began gaining in popularity, attracting patrons with an eclectic rock mix covering a wide range of old and new from The Four Horsemen, AC/DC, and Jimi Hendrix to The Doors and Nirvana. Bringing his Sunday-night club act over from The Copa, Sheppard decided to infuse it with more underground music and remove the age restriction; his all‐ages Sundays immediately became RPM's signature night with teenage crowds reaching capacity well before 9 p.m. each week and many lining up outside around the block at the foot of Jarvis Street. Sheppard occasionally booked live acts for appearances during his club Sundays such as the time during fall 1986 when he brought on the still-not-widely-known Beastie Boys whose debut album had just come out.

From the very beginning, in addition to club nights, RPM served as a live music venue. Among others, its star DJ, Chris Sheppard, participated in booking acts for live gigs at the venue, bringing Ministry, Skinny Puppy, and Chris & Cosey throughout 1986. A synth-pop band in the middle of making a turn towards industrial music with the release of their second album, Ministry's show at RPM on 10 April 1986 became particularly notable due to its bootleg recording that would end up getting circulated for almost thirty years before the band eventually decided to release it as an official live album named Toronto 1986.

Initially capped at 1,100, RPM's capacity steadily expanded over the years due to high demand. Featuring oversized art, blacklight, and bright psychedelic lighting throughout the venue, the group of individuals running RPM especially focused on the club's visual component, manipulating it regularly every year with different installations including dinosaurs, dolphins, an airplane with parachuting soldiers, flashing neon signs as well as a black convertible Cadillac suspended from the ceiling with wax figures of John F. Kennedy and Jacqueline Kennedy Onassis sitting in it. The club's sound system was installed by the Canadian audio engineer Ted MacDonald. Located in a semi-industrial area on the eastern edge of Toronto's downtown, due to being somewhat off the beaten path, RPM's management arranged a free shuttle bus service from Union Station throughout the night.

A few years into RPM's operation, Sheppard moved to Fridays for a 19+ age-restricted night that was simultaneously broadcast live-to-air on CFNY while his vacated Sunday spot got taken over by Terry Kelly and later Matt C. Initially playing dance music in the most general sense, Sheppard's club nights at RPM gradually began moving away from rock and coalescing around house music and the emerging rave culture with even some early bleep techno.

In the early 1990s an adjacent venue opened as The Warehouse, a large club space used for concerts such as Björk, Suede, Radiohead, Pet Shop Boys, Bush, Catherine Wheel, David Bowie, Marillion and Foo Fighters.

=== The Guvernment ===
The declining RPM and The Warehouse venues were taken over in late 1995 by Charles Khabouth. Following extensive renovation, he renamed RPM as The Guvernment, reopening in September 1996. Initially kept, The Warehouse name got changed to Kool Haus by late June 2001. Khabouth revamped RPM by installing a series of smaller lounges and bars within the complex. A sound system was designed for the main room by audio engineer Steve Dash and remained throughout the club's existence despite various renovations. Khabouth credited the system as one of the best in the city and would call Dash up from the United States to tune the room's mixer when required. Additionally, Khabouth also arranged for the installation of a wooden raised floor that had to be redone every year due to wear and tear by dancers at a cost of $30,000 to $40,000, citing it as a necessary component to achieve better sound.

Saturdays at The Guvernment (promoted as 'Spin Saturdays') featured underground electronic dance music until 7AM with resident DJs Mark Oliver and the Manzone & Strong duo. Additionally, 'Spin Saturdays' (later known as 'Alive until 7') played host to many international DJs such as Above & Beyond, Armin Van Buuren, David Guetta, Ferry Corsten, Marco V, Markus Schulz, Deadmau5, Sasha, Paul Oakenfold, and Carl Cox.

Deep Dish created a Global Underground compilation, Global Underground 025: Toronto, based on their performance at the Guvernment.

In 2009, Markus Schulz released a compilation album, called Toronto '09, which reflected on his affection towards the city of Toronto and, in particular, the Guvernment complex.

In December 2014, John Digweed released a live recording of his final set at The Guvernment from two months prior.

Annually, The Guvernment / Kool Haus venues would host "full-complex" events where all seven rooms that made up the complex were accessible. These events were held on long weekends and special occasions and sometimes went as late at 10AM. Some of these events included 'Labour of Love', 'Decadence', 'Freedom', 'Thriller', and the nightclub's anniversary party. On these nights, various international electronic music artists performed in the different themed rooms hosting upwards of 10,000 guests. Steve Lawler's Canada Day sunrise sets on the roof top terrace SkyBar were considered legendary by many.

The Guvernment consistently placed high in DJ Mag's Top 100 Clubs annual list. Its highest ranking, number 8 in the world, came in 2008.

=== Closure and demolition ===
In parallel with the Toronto-wide condo boom that had been on since early 2000s, the rumours and speculation about the imminent sale of The Guvernment's attractive Queen's Quay East lakefront location to property developers and subsequent closure of the nightlife complex had circulated for years. With the rampant trend of downtown Toronto buildings that house nightclubs being sold and then demolished to make way for condominiums, the Toronto Star reported during April 2013 about The Guvernment's fate already being sealed in the same manner. The official confirmation occurred over a year later when, on 1 May 2014, The Guvernment's parent company, INK Entertainment, announced plans of closing the entertainment complex effective 31 January 2015. The decision was prompted by the sale of the city-owned property, that INK had been renting since 1996, to The Daniels Corp, a property development company, which outbid INK and also bought out the rest of the block in preparation for what was expected to be a massive condo development. According to the club's owner Charles Khabouth, the venue had already been slated to close a year earlier, but did not due to his company putting up a legal fight: "We fought tooth and nail, spending a lot of money on legal fees, and ending up not being able to stretch it much more than a year...I knew about it and delayed it as much as I could". He further promised a series of farewell events leading up to the closure.

On Sunday, 25 January 2015, The Guvernment hosted its final event with deadmau5 as the headliner. Resident DJ Mark Oliver along with Khabouth played the final track, Patrick Cowley's mix of "I Feel Love" by Donna Summer. Following a month-long dismantling that commenced immediately after the final night, the complex began demolition in late February 2015.

Khabouth has indicated his intention to build a bigger venue of approximately 100,000 square feet to replace the Guvernment while admitting that it would probably have to be outside of downtown Toronto due to difficulty of finding a suitable property of that size in the heart of the city.

In late March 2015, at a presentation attended by Toronto mayor John Tory, The Daniels Corporation announced plans of building a C$700 million development named City of the Arts that is to include two mid-rise commercial towers, two sky-high residential ones and post-secondary academic space.

== See also ==
- List of electronic dance music venues
