= Rebel (entertainment complex) =

Nightclub and concert venue located on the Polson Pier in Toronto, Canada

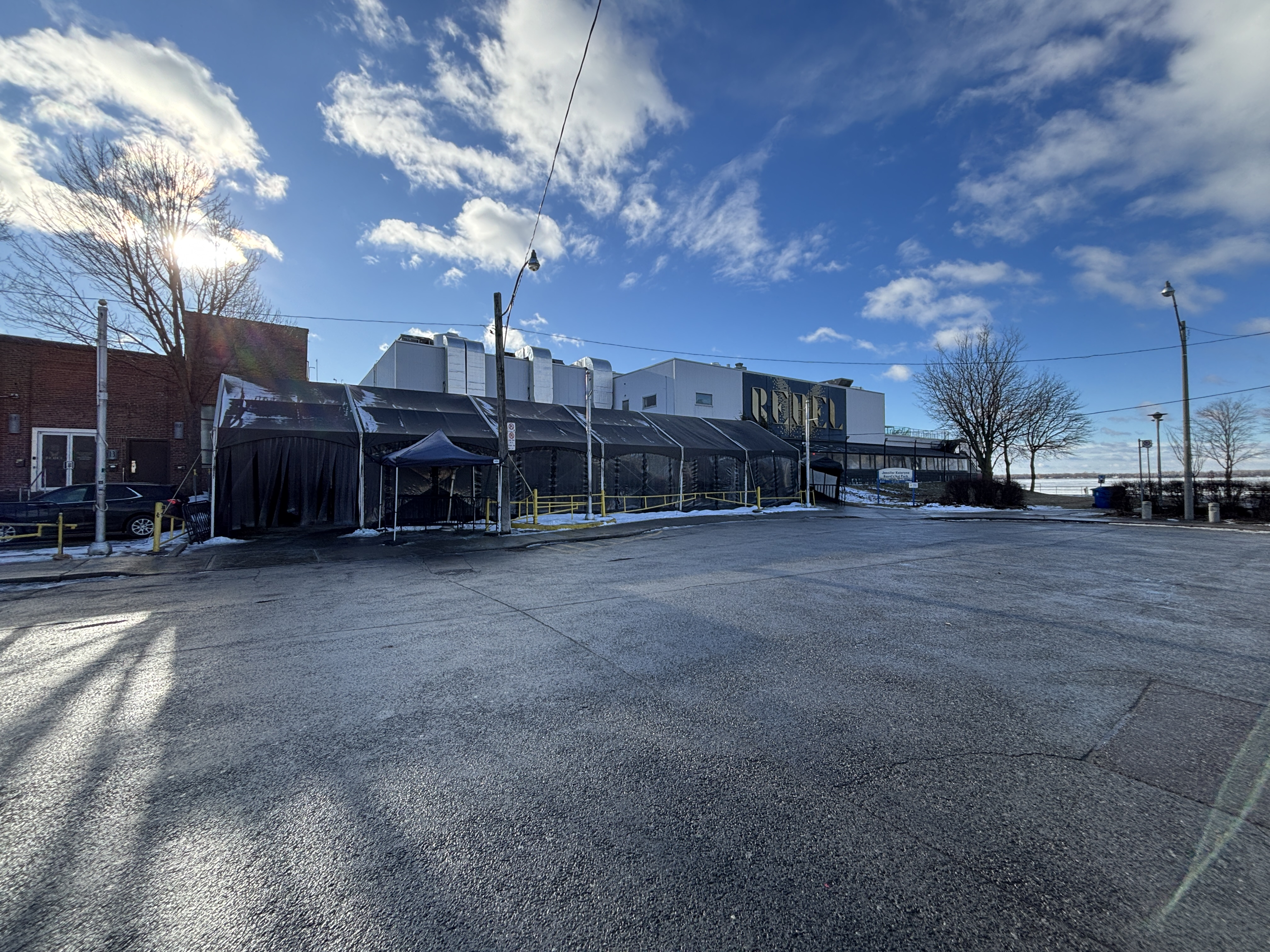
- Interactive map of Rebel
- Former names: Docks Nightclub & Concert Theater (1996–2007); Sound Academy (2007–2016)
- Address: 11 Polson St; Toronto, ON M5A 1A4; Canada
- Location: Lower Don Lands
- Coordinates: 43.6409°N 79.3548°W
- Owner: PowerHouse Corporation
- Operator: INK Entertainment
- Capacity: 3,900

Construction
- Opened: June 1996
- Renovated: 2004, 2016

Website
- rebeltoronto.com
- Building details

General information
- Renovated: January 3 – September 28, 2016
- Renovation cost: $10 million

Renovating team
- Renovating firm: Studio Munge
- Other designers: Apex Sound & Light; Anony
- Main contractor: Kintel

Rebel (commonly stylized as REBEL) (originally the Docks Nightclub & Concert Theater and then Sound Academy) is a nightclub and concert venue located in the Port Lands district of Toronto, Canada. Relaunched in October 2016 as Rebel Night Club, the complex is on the edge of Toronto Harbour, overlooking the Toronto city skyline. The main room has a 65-foot stage with an installation of LED video walls, as well as outdoor grand terraces. The mezzanine hosts the central bar which includes built-in seating.

The venue opened as "the Docks Nightclub" in 1996. A major renovation in 2016 split the venue into four rooms: "The Main Room", "Noir", "Savage" and the "Purple Room". The entire venue (as a whole) can house 3,700, with the concert venue holding up to 2,950 spectators.

== Overview ==
The club has gone through several ownership changes over the past two decades. After former Docks owner Jerry Sprackman lost his liquor licence, Polson Pier Entertainment (PPE) took over. A newly formed company called Maya Corp. applied for the liquor license. Charles Khabouth owns 42.5% of Maya, his business partner Daniel Soberano and a group controlled by PPE each own 25%, and Ralph Soberano owns 7.5%. Venture capitalist Michael Kimel soon entered the picture and started a new company with Khabouth and others named "Powerhouse".

At the end of 2015, Khabouth began a reported $10-million renovation of the complex (which was then called Sound Academy) and the adjoining outdoor Cabana Pool Bar. After 10 months, the complex reopened under the name Rebel. The Rebel complex has four rooms, a 65-foot stage, LED video walls, a grand terrace overlooking the city skyline, and a central bar.

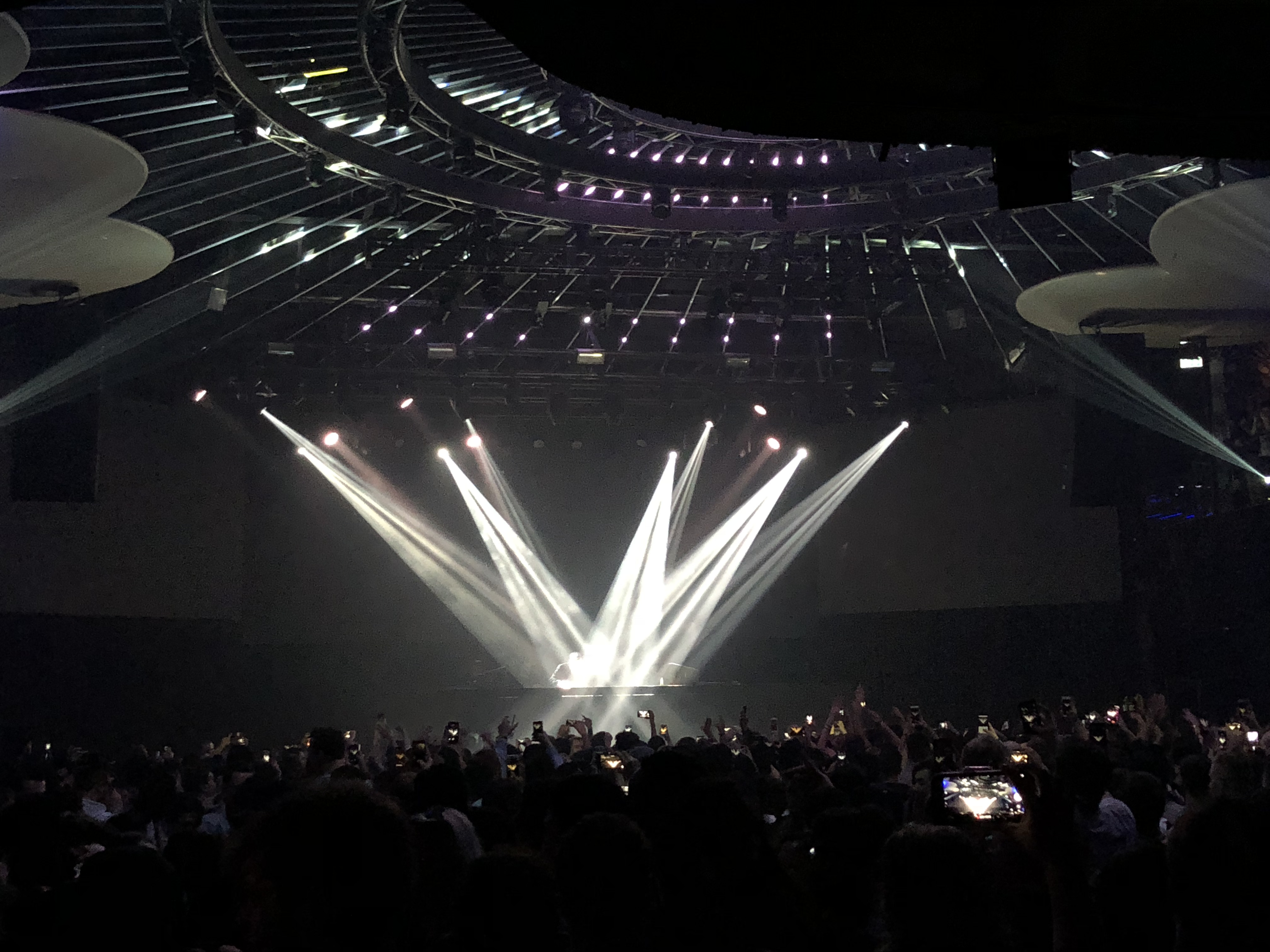
Rebel nightclub concert

== Revolution Saturdays ==
Rebel is well known in Toronto for their weekly episodic series known as Revolution Saturdays. DJ Jed Harper and MC StokesTheMC are paired together weekly in the Main Room. Through the large-scale promotion that Rebel puts out, this weekly Saturday event averages 1700-2400 guests attending. Rebel has also been known to elicit local and international celebrity talent for events; such as Drake, Future, DJ Pauly D, Tyga, ASAP Rocky, Swae Lee, T-Pain, Justin Bieber, 50 CENT, Lil Jon, Steve Aoki, Sheck Wes, DaBaby, French Montana, Cardi B, Tiesto, Pete Tong, Loud Luxury, ASAP Ferg, Lil Tecca, Dr. Fresch and many others.

During Revolution Saturdays, Rebel operates at least three of the four rooms: The Main Room, The Purple Room, The Savage Room, and, from time to time, the NOIR Room. The NOIR room will also sometimes house a guest DJ and operate on a different ticket system. Most of the time, however, patrons are invited to visit all four rooms with one entry ticket.

== Major events hosted ==
- July 22, 2018: Slammiversary XVI, a professional wrestling event produced by Impact Wrestling.
- April 28, 2019: Rebellion, a professional wrestling event produced by Impact Wrestling.
- June 6, 2021: Juno Awards of 2021
- April 16, 2023: Rebellion, a professional wrestling event produced by Impact Wrestling.
- August 27, 2023: Emergence, a professional wrestling event produced by Impact Wrestling.

== See also ==
- List of music venues in Toronto
