= Romain Avril =

French born celebrity chef

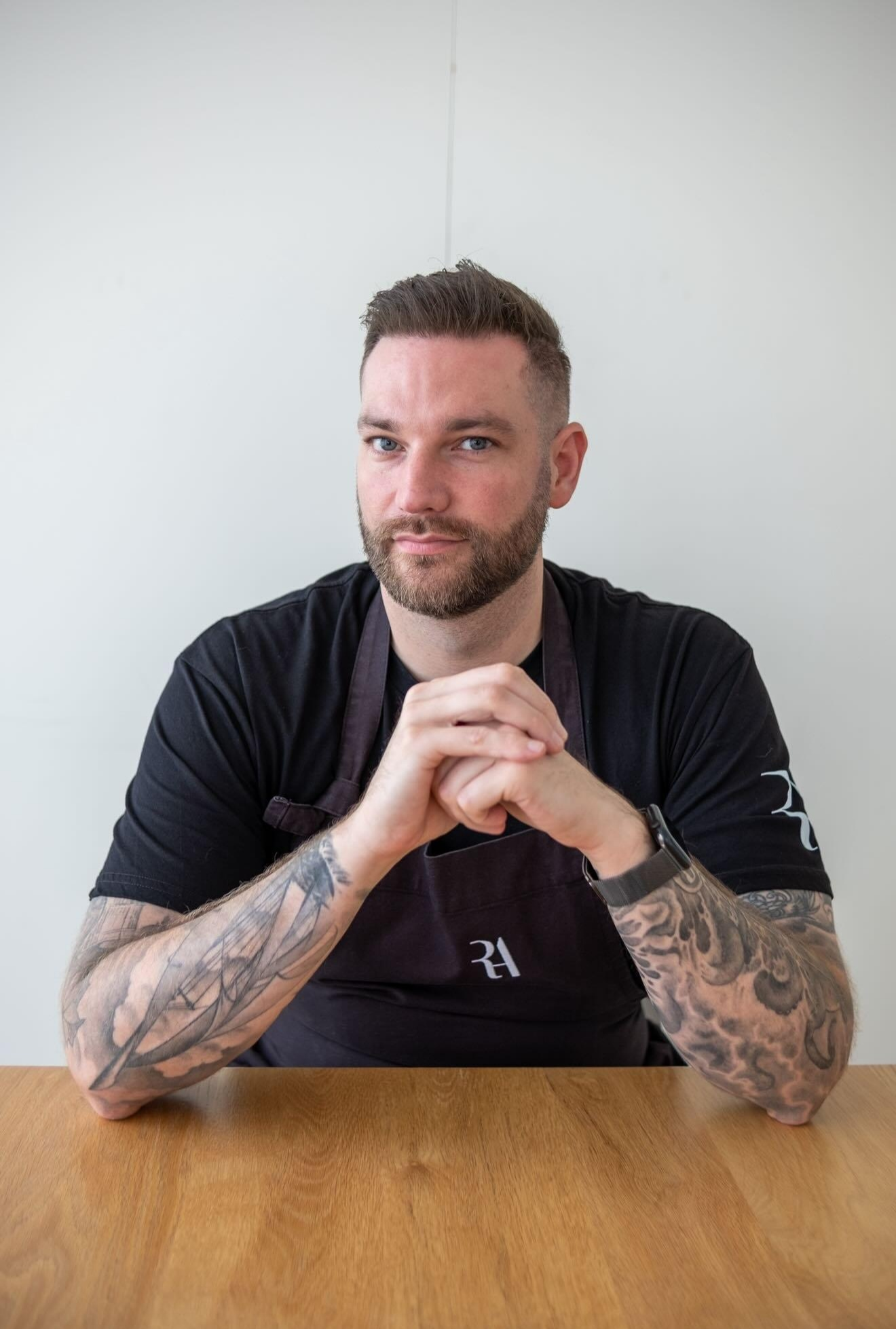
- Born: Romain Avril; November 7, 1985 (age 41); L’Isle Adam (95), Val D’Oise, France
- Occupations: International Chef, Restaurateur, author, tv and radio Personality
- Years active: 2000 – Present
- Known for: Celebrity chef, Michelin trained, Cookbook author, Youtube
- Website: chefromainavril.com

Romain Avril is a French born celebrity chef based in Toronto, Ontario. He was a guest judge twice on Food Network Canada's Top Chef and a finalist on Food Network Chopped Canada. He won his episode of Recipe for Disaster and has made over 100 appearances on television and radio. In August 2023, Romain published his first cookbook, The Vegan Bridge.

In 2020, he launched his YouTube channel.

== Early life and education ==
Avril grew up in his native country, France, where he started his passion for cooking at the age of 13. He enrolled in cooking school at Lycee Branly (La Roche sur Yon, Vendee, France) at 14 where he graduated with his BEP Cuisine in 2002 and his BAC PRO Cuisine in 2004. In 2006, Romain moved to Nantes and obtained his BTS in F&B and Hospitality Management. Finally, he graduated with his Degree in Chinese and French Gastronomy and Art of Dining in 2007 from University of Angers while getting the possible marks with his thesis highlighting the use of plants and flowers in French and Chinese cuisine.

== Career ==
In 1999, Romain had his first real experience in a kitchen at a local restaurant in Les Sables d’Olonne. This couple of weeks in field would have him deciding to enroll in cooking school the following year. In 2001, he had his first internship at the Hotel Restaurant L’Ocean in St-Vincent sur Jard. From 2002 to 2004, Romain worked weekends while at school during the week at a local restaurant called La Flambée.

In 2004, Romain got his first Michelin experience working at Le Domaine de La Bretesche. He once again got a summer job here and spent 6 months altogether in the establishment. In 2005, he got his second one-star Michelin experience working at the Noga Hilton in Cannes. He also worked a summer job at The Walts in Disneyland Paris.

In 2007, Romain moved to the United Kingdom and started to work at The Greenhouse, a 2 Michelin star restaurant in Mayfair, London. From 2007 to 2009, he worked at The Langshott Manor, a Surrey restaurant pushing for its first Michelin star. From mid-2009 to late 2010, Romain moved to his last venue in the UK working as a Senior Sous-chef at The Branksome Hotel in Haslemere, Surrey.

In September 2010, Romain moved to Toronto, Canada, on a twelve-month visa. He started to work a week later at a French Restaurant called Le St Tropez as an Executive Chef. He then got hired at Claudio Aprile's Colborne Lane as Chef de partie and was soon promoted to Sous Chef.

In 2014, Romain opened a new Claudio Aprile restaurant, known as Origin North, as an Executive Sous Chef and became the Chef de Cuisine. From 2014 to 2016, he took on the project to revive a popular French brasserie owned by Charles Khabouth, La Societé, as Executive Chef. In 2015, he participated as a candidate for Chopped Canada and was a finalist. In 2016, Romain was approached by Peter Freed to open the project, Lavelle, a 16000 square foot rooftop patio and restaurant in the heart of downtown Toronto's King West neighbourhood. This led him to being a guest judge on Food Network's Top Chef Canada.

In 2017, he got his first ambassadorships with Nespresso Canada (2020) and Monogram Canada. This led him to launch his first company, Romain Avril Inc. From 2018 to 2019, he started the position of Culinary Director at Neruda, in the east end of Toronto. Since 2019, Romain has been teaching part time as George Brown College as well as running a food segment on CBC Radio Canada. Avril launched his own social media series, Serve it or Trash it providing a lighthearted comic relief to his followers.

He also launched his merchandise Franchiz’d after his series of croissant reviews took off internationally. COVID had to make him close his first restaurant before it even opened. Avril has since pivoted to offer multiple services, focusing on high end private dining in client’s home and corporation. Consulting in the hospitality industry also has been a large focus. He has collaborated with luxury brands through partnerships and social media activations.

He's also running virtual and in person cooking classes. In 2023, he launched his cookbook, The Vegan Bridge and currently working on his second one.

== Television ==
Romain hosts Dinner in Paris, a Gusto TV cooking series in which he prepares classic French dishes and explores the traditions behind them.
