= 23 Hop =

Warehouse event space in Toronto, Ontario, Canada

Coordinates: 43.64894°N 79.39220°W

23 Hop was a warehouse event space in Toronto, Ontario, Canada. It was an early venue for electronic music and a venue for raves. It was located at 318 Richmond Street West in the city's former Garment District which had recently become re-zoned into the city's Entertainment District.

Although the space was active in the late 80s, it would not come to be known as 23 Hop until 1990, when it was taken over by Wesley Thuro, a club and restaurant owner, who would showcase his lighting and sound equipment, and Chris Sheppard, a notable Canadian DJ who would occasionally perform.

The unlicensed venue's second and third floors would often be rented out as an after-hours club for house music events. Eventually, it would hold regular events by Exodus Productions and many other similar production companies that would signal the birth of the rave movement in Canada.

23 Hop closed in the summer of 1995.

Following 23 Hop's closure, the 318 Richmond building's interior and exterior underwent significant renovation—including addition of rooftop patio as well as conversion of adjacent parking lot into street-side patio—as part of the launch of The Joker, a mega nightclub playing commercial dance music. By the end of the 1990s, the property was sold to a developer that promptly demolished it in anticipation of starting construction of a new condo building. After several years as a parking lot, a 39-floor, 402-unit condominium building known as Picasso on Richmond was built.

In 2019, The Legend of 23 Hop, a documentary film was released citing the importance of the club on the city's electronic music cultural history.

== List of performers ==
- Moby
- Mark Oliver
- Dino & Terry
- Sean L.
- Dr. No
- Malik X
- DJ Ruffneck
- Jungle PhD
- Kenny Glasgow
- Matt C
- John E
- Danny Henry
- David Crooke

Source: Then and Now Toronto
