= Toronto Entertainment District =

Entertainment District
- Neighbourhood
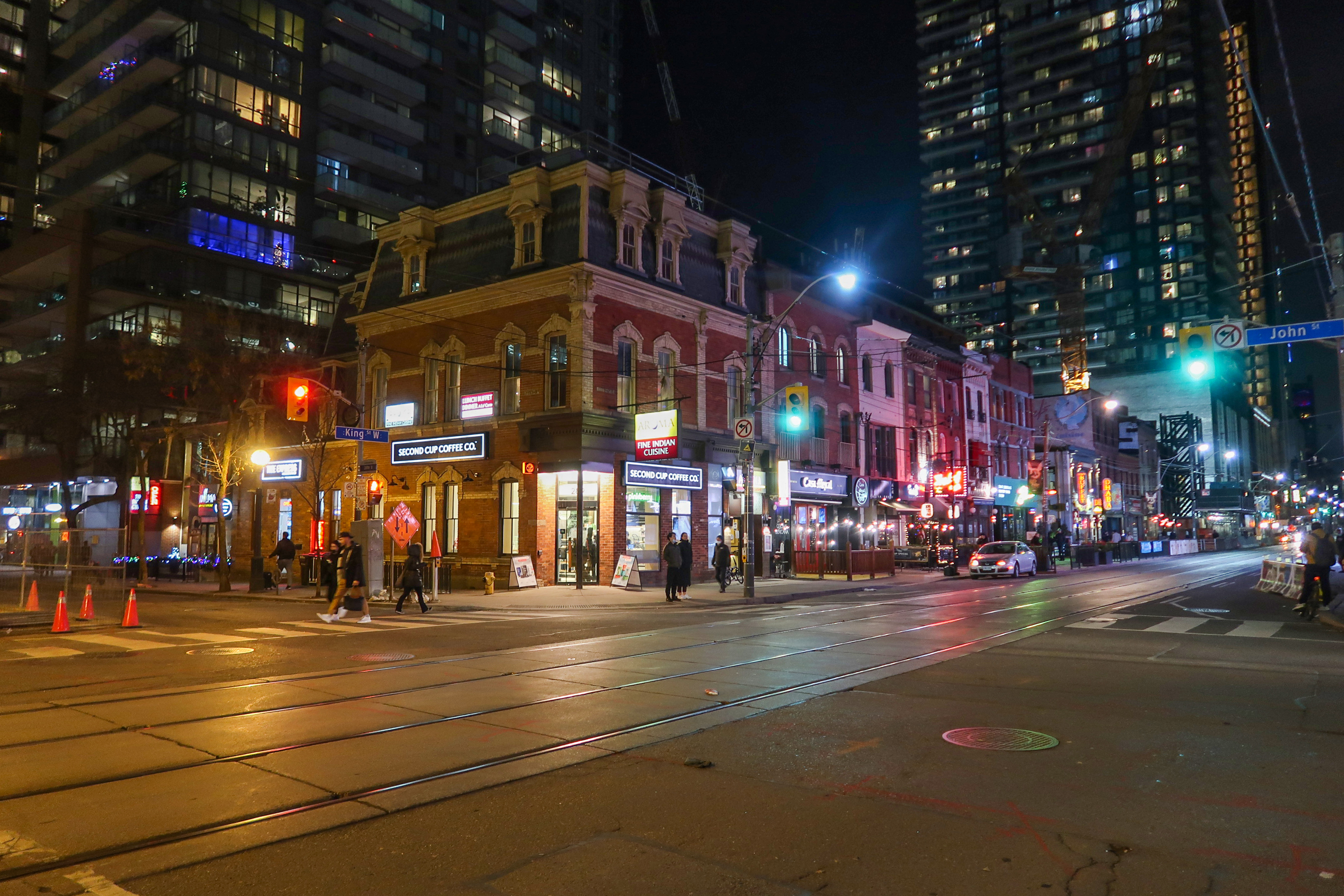
- Entertainment District from John Street and King Street West

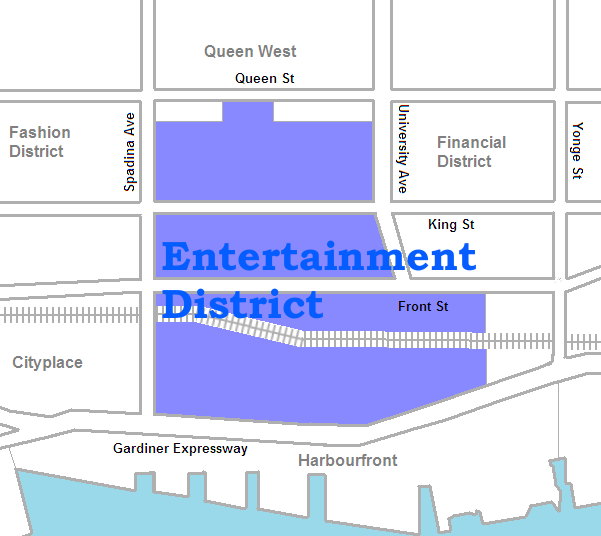
- Vicinity

- Location within Toronto
- Country: Canada
- Province: Ontario
- City: Toronto

Government
  - MP: Chi Nguyen (Spadina—Harbourfront)
  - MPP: Chris Glover (Spadina—Fort York)
  - Councillor: Ausma Malik (Ward 10: Spadina–Fort York)

Area
  - Total: 0.986 km^{2} (0.381 sq mi)

Population (2021)
  - Total: 25,094
  - Density: 25,450/km^{2} (65,900/sq mi)
- Postal codes: M5H, M5V, M5X
- Area code: 416, 647 and 437

The Toronto Entertainment District is an area in downtown Toronto, Ontario, Canada. It is concentrated around King Street West between University Avenue and Spadina Avenue. It is home to theatres and performing arts centres, the Toronto Blue Jays, and an array of cultural and family attractions.

The area was also home to most of the nightclubs in downtown Toronto, but these have mostly moved to King Street west of Spadina Avenue just beside the Entertainment District.

The Toronto Entertainment District is represented by Ward 10 Spadina—Fort York along with the federal and provincial ridings of Spadina—Fort York, and the postal codes are M5H, M5V and M5X. It is patrolled by the 52 Division of the Toronto Police Service.

== History ==
=== Garment District ===
In the first half of the 20th century, the original name of the neighbourhood was the Garment District and it was almost wholly industrial. The Canadian National Railway controlled a huge amount of land along the Lake Ontario waterfront, and to the north many firms took advantage of the easy access to rail and the harbour. The most important industry was textiles and fashion, and the area had few residents. Much of the area was built after the 1904 fire, which forced many businesses to move west of the Bay Street and Front area.

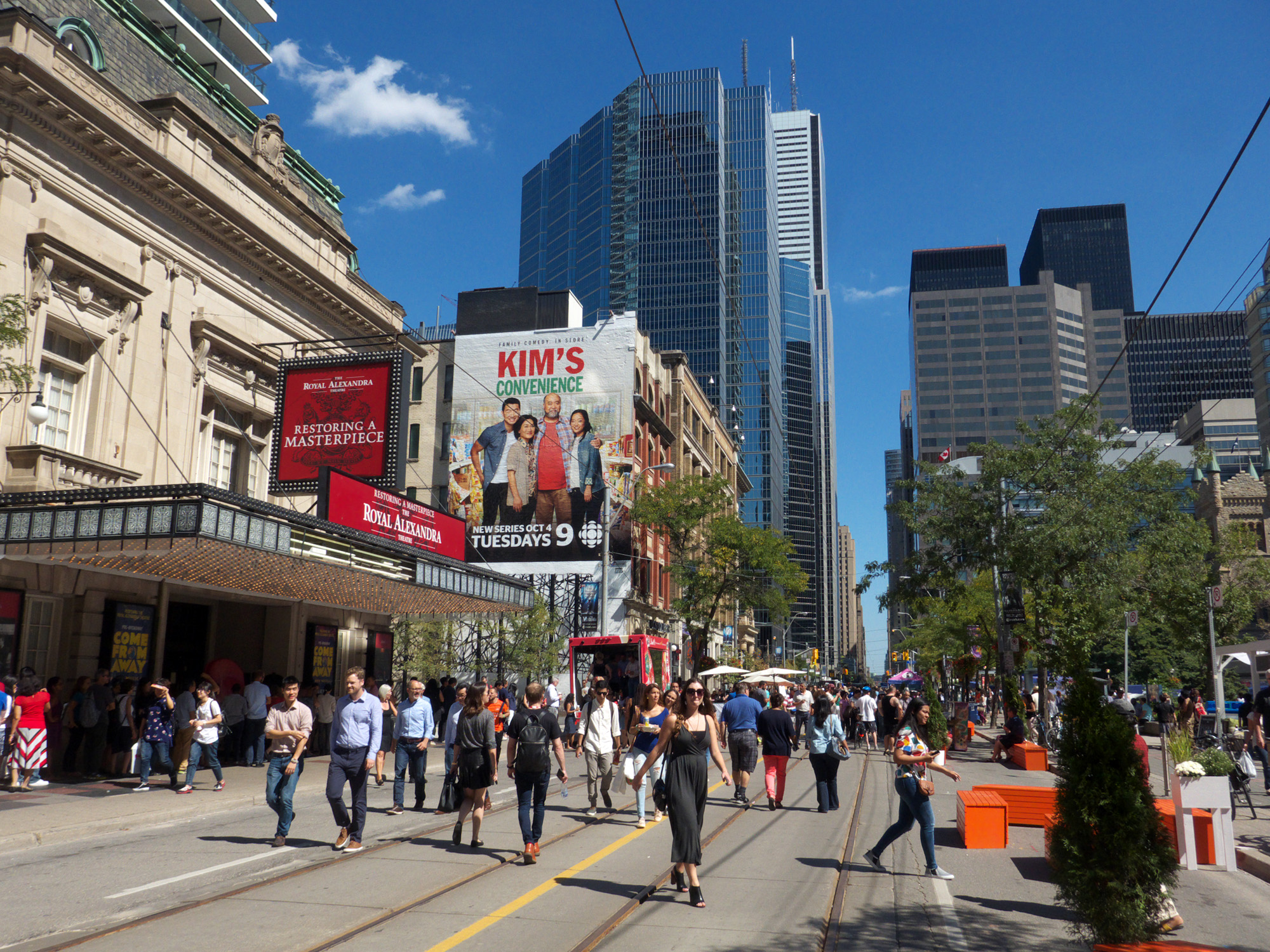
The Royal Alexandra Theatre (left) during the Toronto International Film Festival. Opened in 1907, the theatre is the oldest continuously operating theatre in North America.

Among the industry, the area was home to the Royal Alexandra Theatre whose construction and launch were financed by four Toronto business leaders—Cawthra Mulock, Robert Alexander Smith, Stephen Haas, and Lol Solman. Opened in 1907, the Beaux-Arts styled proscenium-stage theatre is the oldest continuously operating legitimate theatre in North America. Following the death of the last individual from its original ownership group, the theatre began to be run by the trustees of the Cawthra Mulock estate (another one of the original owners). By then, the neighbourhood had almost fully transformed into an industrial district with additional manufacturing facilities appearing throughout. Structures such as the Gelber Building (built in 1912 by Jewish immigrants from the town of Berezhany within the Austro-Hungarian Empire's poorest province of Galicia, Louis and Moses Gelber, to house their Gelber Bros Limited wool garment manufacturing business before adding a warehouse next door in 1932) and ACME Carbon and Ribbon building (built in the 1930s for the World War I veteran James Alexander Campbell's printing and publishing business), located on adjacent corners of the intersection of Richmond West and Duncan, were among the many examples of the manufacturing industry taking over the area.

By the mid-1950s, Royal Alex turned into a money-losing operation, and was in 1962 sold for $200,000 to the forty-eight-year-old businessman Ed Mirvish, owner of the Honest Ed's discount department store. Initially unsure about what he wanted to do with the newly acquired property—and facing the drawback of being in an increasingly neglected industrial area of town, across the street from the CP Rail Yards—the businessman eventually decided to invest in an extensive renovation of the theatre.

Hoping to attract more people to the area, Mirvish also decided to add dining to the theatrical offering. To that end, he proceeded to purchase the industrial warehouses adjacent to Royal Alex on King St. West's north side—including the 1904-erected six-storey warehouse known as the Reid Building at 266 King Street West, immediately west of the theatre—and, in 1963, open Ed's Warehouse, a prix fixe menu restaurant. Originally meant to recreate the atmosphere of Boston's Durgin-Park—a restaurant Mirvish reportedly enjoyed—with communal seating at long tables and sawdust floors, Mirvish ultimately decided to go in a different direction with Ed's Warehouse, loading it with cheap eccentric decor. Offering simple food and Barnum & Bailey-like ambience amid garishly set interior featuring oversized oriental vases, red-flocked wallpaper, Tiffany lamps, bronze and marble statues, stained-glass windows, and lamps with naked women on their bases, the restaurant acted as a complementary offering to the theatre in hopes of increasing revenues for Mirvish via catering to patrons who may want to have dinner before taking in the show next door. Looking to reduce costs, Ed's Warehouse served a very basic pre-set menu revolving around beef (prime rib or roast), mashed potatoes, Yorkshire pudding, and gravy followed by spumoni ice cream for dessert while requiring its male patrons to wear a suit jacket and tie and insisting on it long after other dining establishments had eliminated the tradition. Nevertheless, despite its lack of culinary ambition, the establishment would go on to become one of the most famous restaurants in Toronto, running for 37 years—serving its last meal in late 1999 and closing in 2000.

The business synergy and integration between Royal Alex Theatre and Ed's Warehouse was prominently displayed, such that Royal Alex subscribers would receive their show tickets in the mail along with two complimentary coupons for Ed's Warehouse. From the mid-1970s, the popularity of Ed's Warehouse prompted Mirvish into launching numerous spinoff hospitality ventures within the warehouses around the Royal Alex Theatre, such as restaurants Ed's Seafood, Ed's Italian, Ed's Chinese, and Old Ed's, as well as Ed's Folly lounge.

The trend of the manufacturing industry vacating the area increased in the 1970s, leaving behind an array of heritage warehouses and factories that began to be converted to other uses. Meanwhile, from 1976, the newly opened CN Tower brought many tourists to the neighbourhood. Still, the most notable arrival was nightclubs that began opening sporadically in the early 1980s before becoming the area's staple and most recognizable feature from early 1990s onward.

=== 1980s: Arrival of nightclubs, Roy Thomson Hall, and SkyDome ===
In January 1980, the Trinidad-born and Brooklyn-raised Assoon brothers (David, Albert, Tony and Michael) together with Luis Collaco and Bromely Vassell opened The Twilight Zone, Toronto's first large dance nightclub, at 185 Richmond Street West between Simcoe and Duncan Streets. Modeled after New York City's famous Paradise Garage club, the Twilight Zone quickly became popular with the Toronto youth, featuring lesser-known musical styles including underground disco, house, hip-hop, and techno thus giving the city its first taste of the kind of New York City-style underground clubbing. Though located in a mostly unfurnished former industrial warehouse, the Twilight Zone still featured a US$100,000 state-of-the-art sound system courtesy of New York City sound engineer Richard Long. Paid for with a sizable bank loan the Assoons took out by putting their father's house as collateral, its bass could purportedly be heard from miles away.

Operating without a liquor licence, thus not serving any alcohol throughout its run, the afterhours club initially made a name via its Saturday night parties that went until the Sunday morning dawn featuring owners Tony and Albert Assoon spinning underground disco, funk, and freestyle tunes. Furthermore, on Saturday nights, they introduced a practice of bringing international DJs, mostly from New York City and Chicago, such as David Morales, Johnny Dynell, Frankie Knuckles, David DePino, and Kenny Carpenter. Many of these early bookings were done through Judy Weinstein, New York based businesswoman and Morales' manager, who ran her own record pool that the Assoons were able to access for DJ bookings as well as vinyl material. In addition to attracting diverse general crowds, the club also became frequented by touring performers showing up unannounced just to hang out and party such as Detroit DJs Derrick May and Alton Miller who got brought into the DJ booth for impromptu performances. Performers booked on Saturdays went beyond DJs so that acts like LL Cool J, Sly Fox, The S.O.S. Band, D Train, Divine, Eartha Kitt, Spoons, Jermaine Stewart, and Anne Clark also played the club.

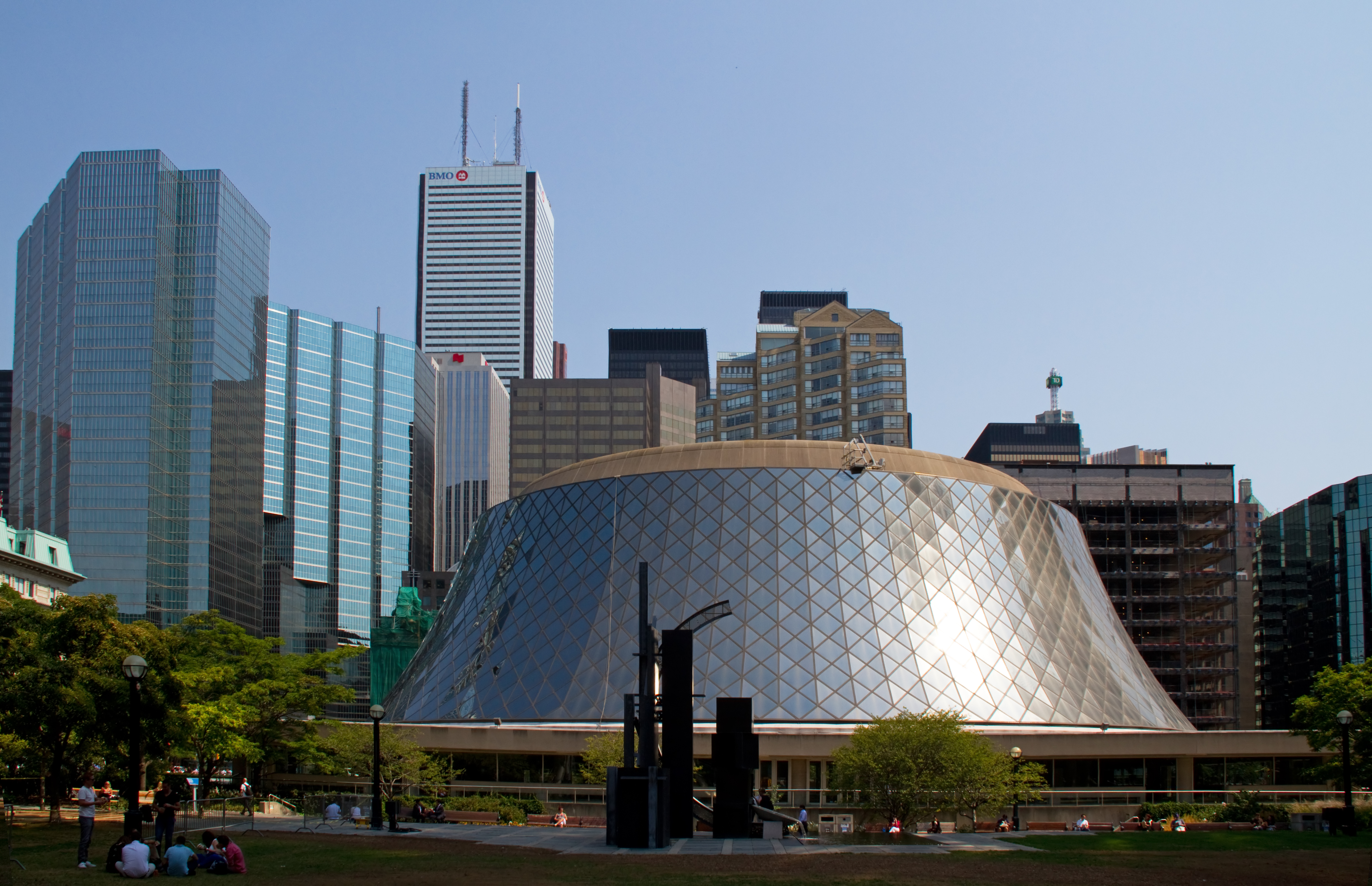
Roy Thomson Hall is home to the Toronto Symphony Orchestra. The concert hall was opened in 1982.

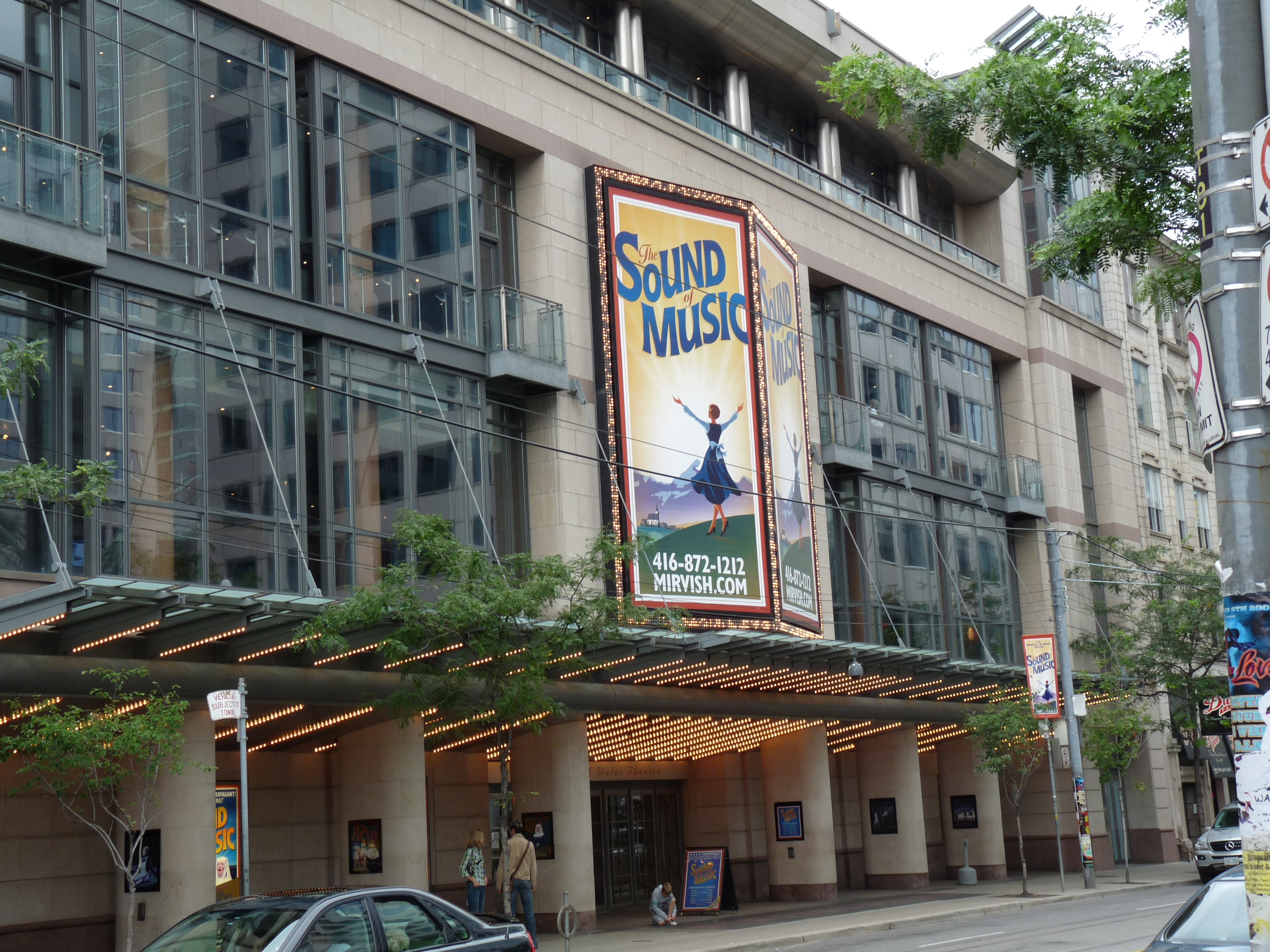
The Princess of Wales Theatre was built in 1993 by Mirvish Productions.

In 1982 Roy Thomson Hall opened at King and Simcoe, becoming the new home of the Toronto Symphony Orchestra thus expanding entertainment options in the neighbourhood beyond partying at the Twilight Zone.

With the arrival of early house music out of Chicago in 1984, the Twilight Zone was among the first venues anywhere, alongside clubs in Chicago and New York City, to embrace the new sound, playing it heavily throughout its Saturdays club nights — the very first club in Toronto to do so. The Assoon brothers' business relationship with Weinstein and her 'For the Record' music pool benefited the club in this regard, enabling it to obtain and play new tracks and records long before they were available to the general public. Within two years, following the increased availability of house records in stores, the genre spread to other Toronto clubs such as the Copa in the Yorkville neighbourhood and the Diamond on Sherbourne Street that dedicated specific club nights to house.

Into the mid-1980s, as the popularity of the Twilight Zone grew continuously, its offering expanded to other nights of the week. First to Fridays featuring Don Cochrane, a DJ from Scotland, playing new wave as part of a UK dance party theme and then Wednesdays, promoted as 'Pariah Wednesdays', featuring local DJs Siobhan O'Flynn and Stephen Scott who played a blend of alternative rock, UK pop, disco, and psychedelia. In May 1985, the Beastie Boys, in town as the opening act on Madonna's The Virgin Tour, were booked for an after-show party at the Zone courtesy of Jonathan Gross, a writer for Rolling Stone and music critic for the Toronto Sun, who also handled some of the booking for the club. According to Gross, they got paid $1,500 and a case of Molson's for the club gig. Their chaotic appearance became part of the Twilight Zone's lore as the trio began essentially vandalizing the club's interior by spray painting its walls, however, instead of stopping them, owner Michael Assoon urged them to resume and their graffiti was kept as a badge of honour of sorts for the remainder of the club's run. Furthermore, the day before their scheduled paid appearance, they also showed up at the club during its Pariah Wednesdays night, reportedly visibly intoxicated, and tried to gain access to the DJ booth Resident DJ Siobhan O'Flynn politely declined.

In May 1987, popular local television station Citytv and Canada-wide cable channel MuchMusic (both owned by the same corporate entity, CHUM Limited) moved their headquarters to 299 Queen Street West (also known as the CHUM-City Building) on the northern edge of the neighbourhood.

It was not until late 1987 that the still mostly deserted area got another nightclub, Stilife, which was opened by 25-year-old Charles Khabouth at the corner of Richmond West and Duncan. Its young owner quickly managed to monetize it by attracting affluent Toronto crowds, a business success that would in a few years bring many new nightclubs to the area.

In September 1988, recent arrivals to the neighbourhood MuchMusic and Citytv launched Electric Circus, a weekly dance music show airing live on Saturdays in the late afternoon from the CHUM-City Building's ground-level studios as a simulcast on both stations. Quickly becoming popular with the Toronto-area youth turning up to watch the proceedings in the studios visible from the street (or even hoping to get inside and dance), the show began drawing more young crowds to the area increasingly becoming associated with nightlife and partying.

The railway lands to the south were also converted to other uses. The SkyDome sports arena opened in 1989, bringing thousands of fans of the Toronto Blue Jays and the Toronto Argonauts as well as fans of big musical acts to the area.

=== 1990s: Birth of the Entertainment District ===
Khabouth's success with Stilife made other entrepreneurs take notice; despite the Twilight Zone's 1989 closure, numerous new clubs began appearing from 1990 onward, attracted by the developing nightlife scene and still relatively cheap rent. Most notable among this sudden influx of clubs were:

- Go-Go, a three-level superclub opened by the Ballinger brothers on 13 July 1990 across the street from Stilife at the north-west corner of Richmond West & Duncan,
- 23 Hop, a minimalist all-ages club opened by Wesley Thuro during summer 1990 at 318 Richmond West (a warehouse down the street from Stilife) that would soon become a catalyst for the early Toronto rave scene,
- Klub Max, a huge venue launched in 1990 by Nick DiDonato and Angelo Belluz in a heritage building on Peter Street just south of King Street West that previously housed DiDonato's P.M. Toronto sports bar and restaurant, and
- LimeLight, a stylish club opened in 1993 by businessman Zisi Konstantinou at 250 Adelaide Street West near the corner with Duncan Street.

This trend continued at such a rate that, by mid-1990s, the area became home to one of the largest concentrations of nightclubs in North America. Along with the nightclubs, many bars and restaurants opened to serve these crowds.

Given the success of the long-running Royal Alexandra Theatre, in 1993, the Mirvish family built the new 2,000-seat Princess of Wales Theatre a block over. Alternative theatres—such as Theatre Passe Muraille (in a former warehouse) and Factory Theatre (in a former manse), in the adjacent neighbourhoods of Alexandra Park and Fashion District, respectively—were also already in existence in the general vicinity: leading to Toronto emerging as the world's third-largest centre for English-language theatre, behind only London (West End theatre) and New York (Broadway theatre)."

Canada's Walk of Fame got established in 1998, right in front of the two Mirvish-owned theaters on King St. West between Simcoe and John streets, acknowledging the achievements of successful Canadians.

In 1999, Festival Hall opened at the southwest corner of Richmond West & John, containing the flagship Paramount Theatre Toronto that has since been re-branded as Scotiabank Theatre Toronto.

=== 2000s: Condo boom and population spike ===
Historical population
Year	Pop.	±%
2011	10,588	—
2016	19,908	+88.0%
2021	25,094	+26.0%

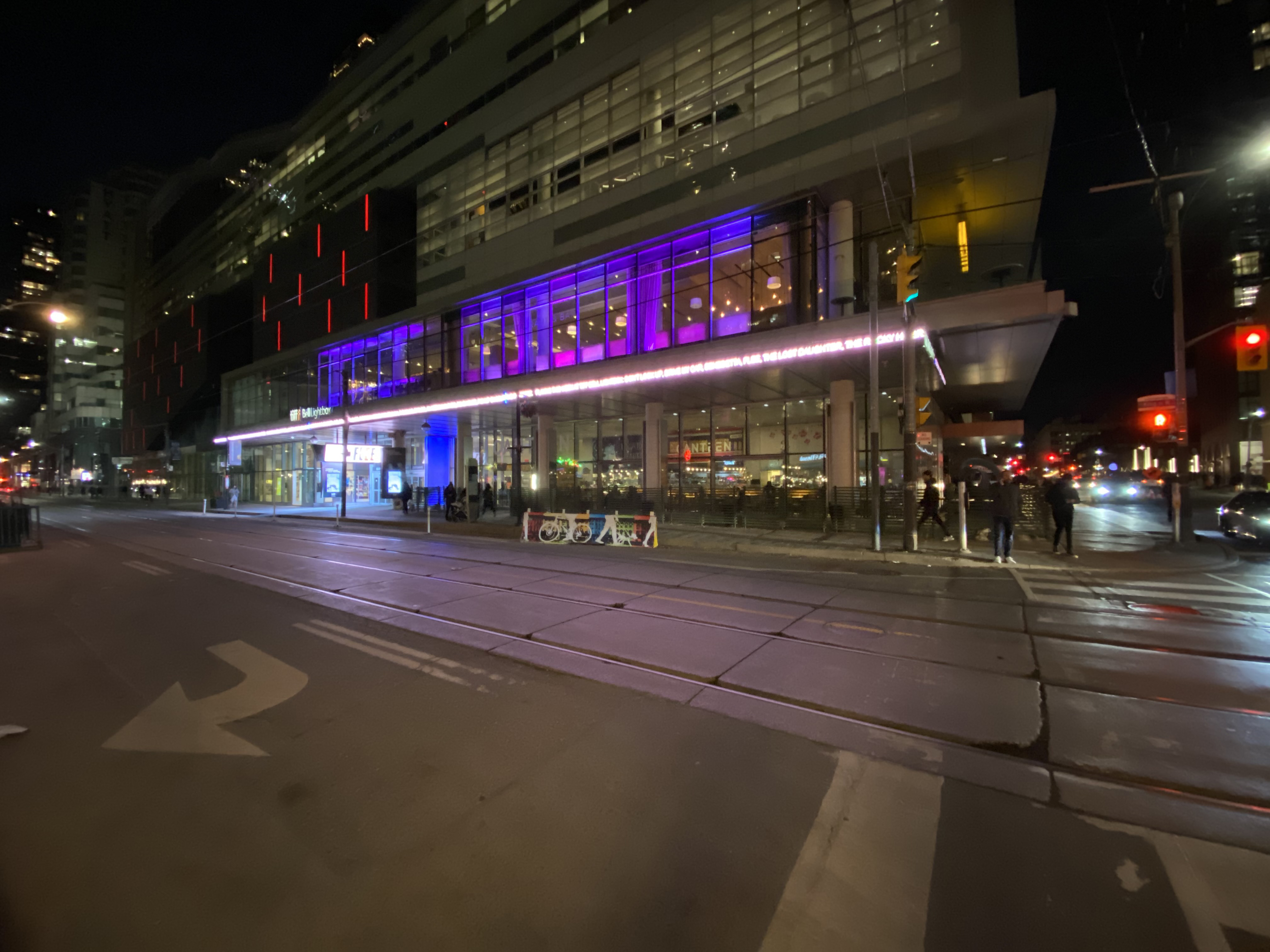
Festival Tower is a cultural centre, condominium, and headquarters for the Toronto International Film Festival. The building was one of several condos built in the area during Toronto's 2000s condo boom.

In 2001, twenty-one-year-old local hospitality entrepreneur and former minor league hockey player Travis Agresti opened Inside at 218 Richmond Street West, a three-level nightclub that would become notable due to its association with the Raptors' basketball superstar Vince Carter who within two years decided to invest in the huge venue, becoming its co-owner. The two had reportedly met during late 1990s at nearby Fluid nightclub where Agresti worked as venue manager before deciding to launch his own nightlife venture down the street. Carter reportedly came to Inside's opening night and, liking what he saw, eventually decided to invest in the club. Though not involved in day-to-day running of the venue, Carter's high media profile nevertheless attracted a long list of visiting athletes, musicians, and entertainers to Inside throughout early-to-mid-2000s, such as Jason Kidd, Antawn Jamison, Barry Bonds, Prince, Nelly Furtado, NSYNC, Kanye West, Paris Hilton, Chris Rock, Jessica Alba, Elisha Cuthbert, etc. Even with Carter getting traded from the Raptors in late 2004, the club continued to thrive as a partnership between him and Agresti, expanding and opening additional lounges within the complex. However, the operation soured in the late 2000s due to the 2008 financial crisis and suddenly folded. By 2010, the space got turned into day care for the kids of employees working in the nearby Financial District.

Simultaneously, all throughout the early 2000s, the Toronto condo boom began to transform the area. The abandoned warehouses began to be turned into lofts, or demolished to make way for condominium towers. The core of the Entertainment District had only 750 residents in 1996, but this had gone up to 7,500 by 2005. The crowds, noise, and occasional crime especially associated with the clubs caused conflict with the new homeowners.

The trend of the area being turned into a residential neighbourhood continued even more rapidly in the second half of the decade. Nightclubs still opened, including the CiRCA superclub launching in October 2007 on John St. between Richmond West and Adelaide West inside the RioCan Hall (formerly Festival Hall), perhaps the most ambitious club ever in Toronto due to its sheer size of 53,000 square feet (4,900 m^{2}) and the money spent before opening. Further adding to its mystique was that the man behind it was Peter Gatien, legendary former New York City nightclub czar who had owned 1980s and 1990s hotspots such as The Limelight and Tunnel before being deported back to Canada. However, CiRCA's financial implosion less than 3 years after opening only served to underscore the neighbourhood's shift and was seen by many as the definitive symbol of the death of Toronto's clubland.

Greater restrictions on venues in the area resulted in loss of jobs; by 2011, the number of clubs had decreased substantially, from 60 to 100 in the period between 2000 and 2006 to 30 in 2013.

On May 10, 2016, Toronto City Council voted unanimously in favour of naming a public laneway in honour of the Twilight Zone nightclub, after a successful online petition. The Twilight Zone club is notable as one of Toronto's first nightclubs to bring House music to a wider audience and on a more commercial level; taking an area that was once abandoned warehouses and transforming it into a hop spot in the city.
