= Bistro 990 =

Restaurant in Toronto, Canada

Coordinates: 43.665074°N 79.387687°W

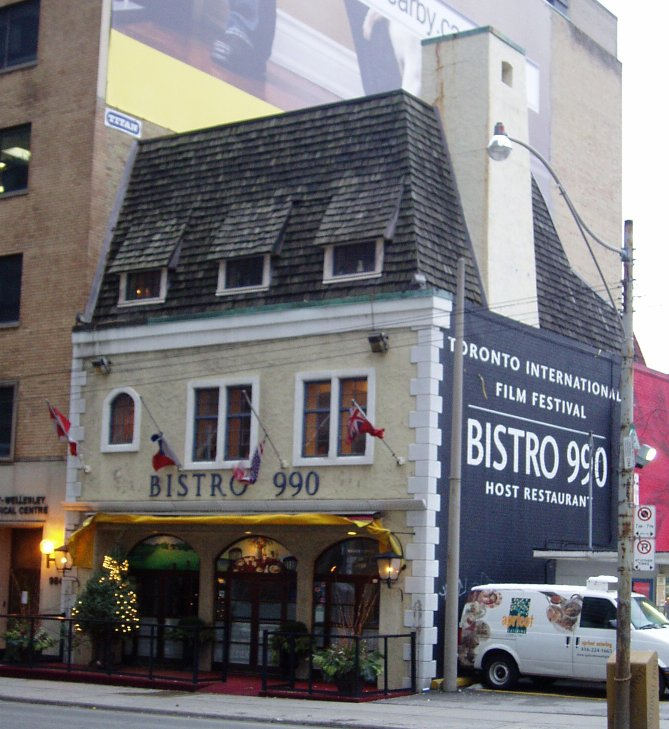
- Bistro 990 on Bay Street in December 2005.
- Interactive map of Bistro 990

Restaurant information
- Established: 1988; 38 years ago
- Closed: March 17, 2012; 14 years ago
- Previous owner: Tom Kristenbrun (1988–2012)
- Chef: Chris Klugman (1988–1989); Derrick Markland (1990–1992); Ricardo Roque (1996–2003); Franco Belvedere (2003–2010); Christopher Hounsell (2010–2012)
- Food type: French
- Location: 990 Bay Street, Toronto, Ontario, Canada

Bistro 990 was a restaurant in Toronto, Ontario, Canada. It closed on March 17, 2012. The bistro served Provençal style French cuisine in an informal atmosphere. Throughout its run the restaurant had been owned by Tom Kristenbrun.

== History ==
Its chef at opening was Chris Klugman who was responsible for several notable Toronto restaurants. The most recent chef was Christopher Hounsell.

The restaurant was a popular Toronto eatery for actors and other celebrities. It was located on Bay Street near Wellesley, just opposite the elite Sutton Place Hotel, and near most of Toronto's other luxury hotels. This district was also the centre of the annual Toronto International Film Festival for years. The Bistro had thus become popular among visiting celebrities.

In February 2012, it was announced that Bistro 990 would close and that the land would be used for a 32-storey condominium.

Demolition on the building began on January 28, 2013.
