= Claudio Aprile =

Uruguayan-Canadian chef

- Born: 23 January 1969 (age 57); Uruguay
- Culinary career
- Previous restaurant(s): Colborne Lane Origin Origin Liberty Origin North Copetin Xango
- Television show: MasterChef Canada
- Website: www.instagram.com

Claudio Aprile (born 23 January 1969) is a Uruguayan–Canadian celebrity chef, restaurateur, cookbook author, and TV personality of Italian descent best known for serving as a judge on CTV's culinary competition MasterChef Canada from 2014 to 2021. Having owned and worked at multiple Michelin-starred restaurants as a professional corporate chef over the years, he served as the head chef, owner and manager of multiple Toronto restaurants, such as Colborne Lane, the Origin chain, Copetin and Xango, which closed down in 2023. On July 8, 2026, Aprile opened up Bar Origin (a contemporary relaunch of his original 2010 Toronto restaurant Origin) in Burlington. He now serves as culinary director for Evolv Group, overseeing the culinary concepts program including Etobicoke’s Via Allegro Ristorante, Burlington’s Di Mario’s Trattoria, and Mademoiselle Raw Bar + Grill.

== Biography ==
Claudio Aprile was born in Uruguay, and raised in Toronto. He has worked in professional, multi-Michelin starred restaurant kitchens as a professional chef internationally. Aprile began cooking at 14 years old. He never received formal training for becoming a chef. As a child, he informed his mother that he would become a chef, rather than attempt to become one. At 18 he travelled to Thailand, which had a profound influence on his style of cooking. He visited 160 cities in 17 countries, before stopping in England, where he worked extensively throughout London until earning the executive position as the head chef at Bali Sugar in Notting Hill.

Working in Bali Sugar in London earned him outstanding reviews and critical acclaim as a young chef. On returning to Toronto in 2000, Aprile continued to improve his reputation at Senses in Toronto.

== Career ==
=== Colborne Lane (2007–2013) ===
In 2007, Aprile opened the restaurant Colborne Lane in Toronto, Canada. In 2009, he opened the original Origin restaurant in Toronto. Due to the success of the original location, he was able to open two more locations within Toronto in the subsequent years.

Colborne Lane offered fusion cuisine with molecular gastronomy, but he switched gears with Origin restaurant. Origin opened in 2010. The food was delivered to guests sitting right across from the chef in the open kitchen. Toronto Life magazine and Now magazine voted Origin the #1 restaurant in Toronto.

Colborne Lane was located on Colborne Street in Toronto, close to St. Lawrence Market. Aprile’s first restaurant, Colborne Lane, was successful and produced for some several chefs including Jonathan Poon, Steve Gonzalez, Matt Blondin, Jonathan Bower, and Romain Avril. Aprile officially closed the restaurant in February 2013.

=== Origin (2009–2017) ===
In 2009, Aprile opened the first Origin restaurant as the executive chef and owner. The original restaurant opened its doors to the public in 2010, it was located on King Street in Toronto and closed in early 2017. In subsequent years, Aprile opened two more Origin restaurants, one in Liberty Village and one in Bayview Village. The Liberty Village location opened in 2012 and closed in 2013. The Origin North Bayview Village location opened in June 2013, in a two-storey building in the parking lot of the Bayview Village mall. The third of Aprile’s Origin restaurants and the first outside the downtown area, it was promotionally featured in MasterChef Canada's Season 1 Restaurant Takeover, and closed in early 2016. Aprile served as the owner of the Orderfire Restaurant Group, which included the Origin brand restaurants, which were voted the #1 restaurant in Toronto by Toronto Life and Now magazine.

=== Copetin Restaurant & Bar Toronto (2017–2019) ===
In June 2017, Aprile reinvented his original Origin restaurant space and opened Copetin Restaurant & Bar at the same Saint James location on King Street East in Toronto. Copetin was featured in Season 5 of MasterChef Canada's Restaurant Takeover team challenge. Aprile closed Copetin in February 2019.

=== Xango (2019–2023) ===
In early September of 2019, Aprile teamed up with Nick Di Donato of the Liberty Entertainment Group to open up Xango, an Asian and Latin American restaurant located in the heart of Toronto's King St. West neighbourhood that specialized in serving Nikkei (Japanese Peruvian) inspired Latin cuisine. Xango closed down without notice in 2023.

=== Bar Origin (2026–present) ===
On July 8, 2026, Aprile opened up Bar Origin in downtown Burlington, a relaunch of his original Origin restaurant. According to Toronto Life, the menu brings back his "greatest hits...the crispy calamari with caramelized peanut sauce or the iconic spicy Japanese hand rolls."

=== Masterchef Canada (2014–2021) ===
Aprile was one of the original three main judges on MasterChef Canada for the first 7 seasons.
