= Bovine Sex Club =

Entertainment venue in Toronto, Canada

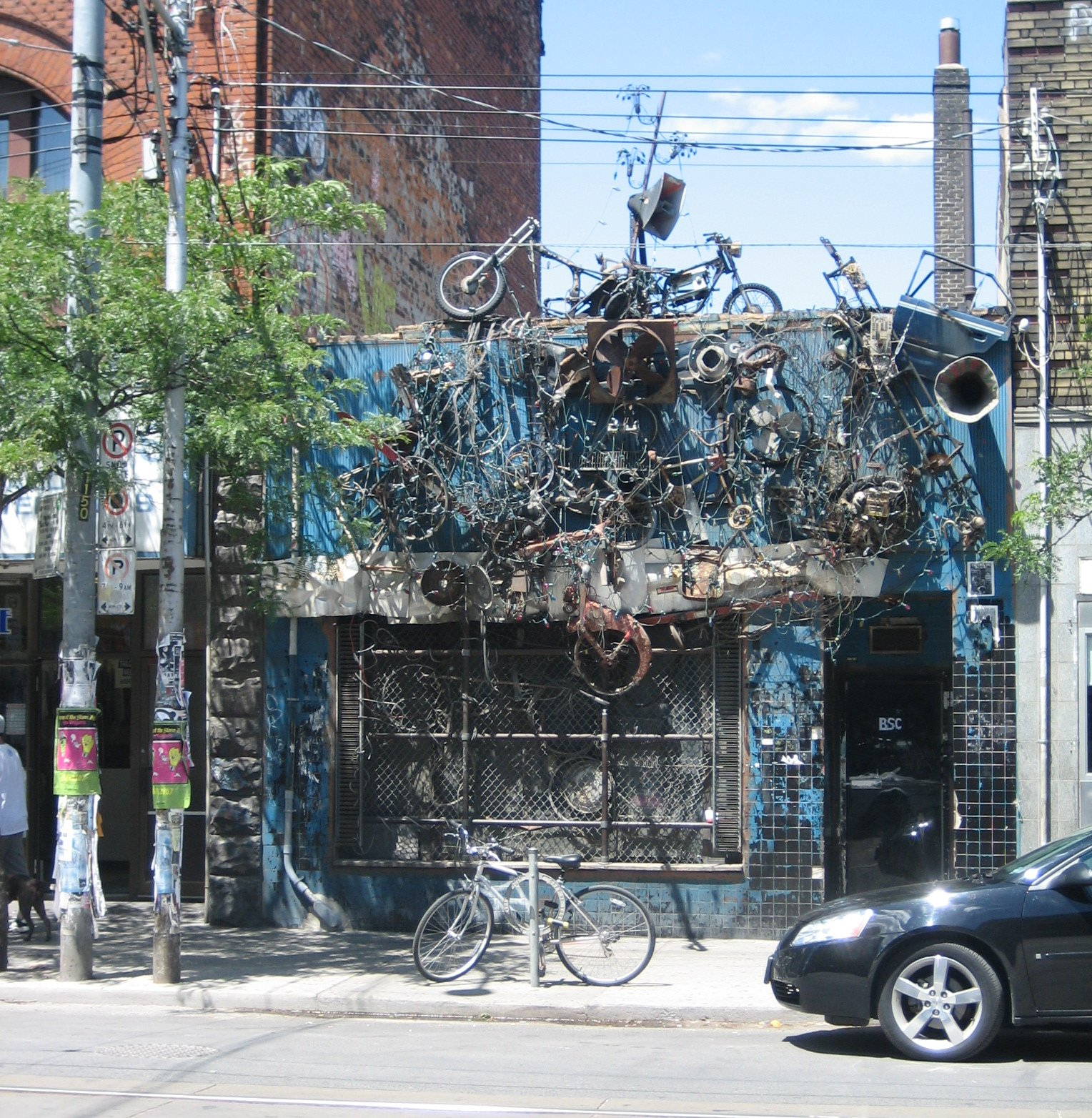
- The Bovine Sex Club exterior in July 2007
- Interactive map of Bovine Sex Club
- Address: 542 Queen Street West
- Location: Toronto, Ontario, Canada
- Coordinates: 43.647636°N 79.402666°W
- Owner: Darryl Fine
- Capacity: 200
- Type: Bar
- Events: Rock, punk, metal, alternative, rockabilly

Construction
- Opened: January 1991

Website
- www.bovinesexclub.com

The Bovine Sex Club is a bar on Toronto's Queen Street West strip. In operation since January 1991, the Bovine Sex Club (often shortened to 'the Bovine') has at various times found itself at the forefront of Toronto's rock, punk, heavy metal, alternative, and rockabilly music scenes.

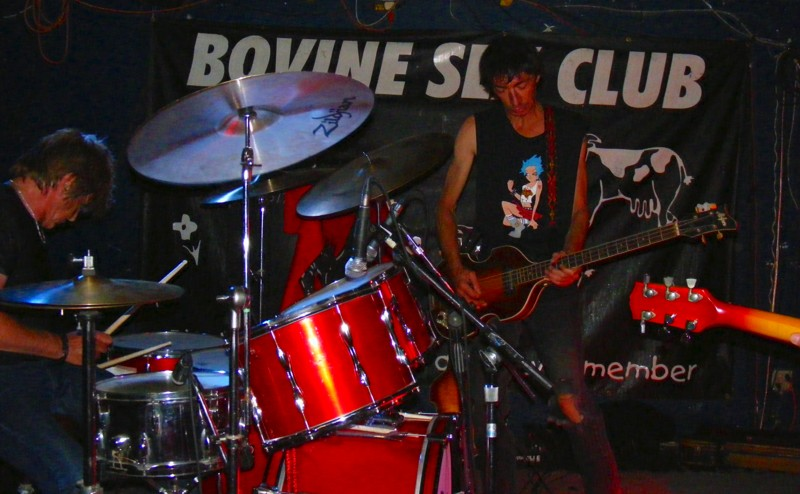
The Ugly performing at the Bovine Sex Club in July 2008

== History ==
The club opened in January 1991 with a trio of Toronto nightlife enthusiasts behind it in ownership capacity — Wesley Thuro a.k.a. Happy Dog who had already had some organizational experience with Toronto nightlife establishments having launched the all ages rave club 23 Hop just a few months earlier in 1990, colourful CFNY radio personality Chris Sheppard who in addition to achieving a measure of local fame as the voice of CFNY's weekend live-to-air broadcasts from various Toronto clubs also performed under the 'DJ Dogwhistle' moniker, and Darryl Fine.

Those who have visited the club include band members and film actors, including Bill Murray, Jello Biafra and Bruce LaBruce.

In 2013 the club opened a rooftop patio bar known as the Tiki Bar.

== Art ==
The Bovine's facade was built by a small group of local artists including Dave Grieveson and Great Bob Scott (also the drummer for The Look People). They worked under the creator of the Bovine, Happy Dog (real name - Wesley Thuro). The exterior and interior were an art installation made solely from discarded items.
