= Tom Kristenbrun =

- Born: 1940 (age 85–86)
- Occupation: Restaurateur
- Years active: 1969-2012
- Spouse: Christine Kristenbrun
- Children: 5 (1 deceased)

Tom Kristenbrun is a Canadian restaurateur, entrepreneur and former professional football player. In 1972, Kristenbrun purchased the historic El Mocambo in downtown Toronto with business partner Michael Baird. Over the years, Kristenbrun owned and operated many restaurants and venues in Toronto including Bistro 990. He played with the Toronto Argonauts in their 1963 season.

== Holdings ==
Holdings
Dates	Establishment	Role
1969–1987	The Jarvis House	Co-owner (1969–1980); Owner (1980–1987)
1972–1989	El Mocambo	Co-owner
1977–1983	The Ports	Co-owner
1977–1994	Bemelmans	Owner
1981–1991	Bellair Cafe	Owner
1981–1991	Rhodes	Owner
1983–1984	Le Gavroche Gourmand	Co-owner
1983–1984	Walrus and the Carpenter	Co-owner
1983–1992	Copa	CEO
1983–1984	Hazelton Cafe	Co-owner
1985–1993	Toby's Goodeats	Owner
1987–1988	Perry's	Owner
1988–1990	Nekah	Owner
1988–2012	Bistro 990	Owner
1988	Gotham Bar & Grill	Owner
1991–1993	Maccheroni Trattoria	Owner
1993–1994	Two Twelve	Owner
