= Charles Khabouth =

Lebanese Canadian nightclub owner, restaurateur, music promoter, and hotelier

- Born: Bechara Khabouth; 1962 (age 63–64); Beirut, Lebanon
- Occupations: Hospitality entrepreneur CEO of INK Entertainment
- Spouse: Libby Eber (m. 1998)
- Children: 2

Bechara "Charles" Khabouth is a Lebanese Canadian nightclub owner, restaurateur, music promoter, and hotelier. Controlling several Toronto-based hospitality properties and venues, he's been dubbed the "King of Clubs" due to his influence on the city's nightlife. In addition to Toronto, he also has venues in Niagara Falls, Montreal, and Miami Beach.

Khabouth manages his properties through INK Entertainment, a company he founded while opening nightclubs in the mid-1980s, his first ventures in the hospitality business. He initially made his name via Stilife, a ritzy nightclub for the posh crowd at the corner of Richmond Street West and Duncan Street in Toronto that ran from 1987 until 1995 triggering what eventually developed into the city's Entertainment District. Still, Khabouth is best known and widely lauded for his association with The Guvernment, a large 60,000-square foot nightclub complex he launched in 1996 and molded into a famous spot that successfully channeled the energy of the local rave scene during mid to late 1990s and later continued as the focal point of Toronto's electronic dance music scene.

Parallel to nightlife, almost immediately after establishing himself with clubs in the late 1980s, Khabouth also began launching upscale restaurants in Toronto, most of them as business partnerships either with local celebrity chefs or various Toronto restaurateur.

By early 2010s, Khabouth decided to enter the hotel aspect of the hospitality industry by announcing construction of Bisha Hotel & Residence, an upcoming 100-room boutique hotel on Blue Jays Way in downtown Toronto's Entertainment District set to open in spring 2016. In addition to the hotel part, Bisha is to contain around 300 condominium units thus taking advantage of the 2000s and 2010s condo boom in Toronto.

Since 2013, Khabouth has continually placed on Toronto Life's '50 Most Influential People in Toronto' annual list.

== Early life ==
Khabouth was born in Beirut during early 1960s to father Antoine Khabouth who worked in hospitality and mother Margaret who took care of the household that in addition to young Charles consisted of his older brother and sister. Raised in privileged circumstances with staff in the house, each of the three siblings attended French Catholic private school. By 1970, after spending years managing a restaurant, his father raised enough funds to open his own supper club called Les Trois Tonneaux that went bankrupt after only six months. On his first night back working at the old restaurant, he suffered a heart attack at age 42 and died. Young Khabouth was only 9 years old at the time. His mother soon remarried, to William Nader, a successful Beirut accountant and close family friend.

In 1975, the outbreak of Lebanese Civil War made living conditions in Beirut unbearable as the family began sleeping in the parking garage beneath their building to stay safe during nightly bombings. Fifteen years of age by this point, young Khabouth began to be courted by the Christian militia. In August 1976, over a year into the conflict, teenage Khabouth got taken out of Lebanon by his stepfather and mother who altogether fled the country by paying to be smuggled to Cyprus in order to escape the war zone. The 14-hour boat ride took place on a fishing vessel carrying 300 people. Four days after reaching Cyprus, the family flew to Athens and then to Toronto where other family members had already settled.

Arriving to Canada, Khabouth enrolled at Overlea Secondary School in East York within Metropolitan Toronto. His penchant for working grueling hours soon emerged as he held three part-time jobs at one point during high school with his first job at a McDonald's while the other two were cleaning carpets and stocking shelves at an IGA store. After graduating, Khabouth took a job at a computer company, but he wanted work that involved dealing with people. Simultaneously, following a few nights out in Toronto, he began growing enamoured with the nightclub scene, quickly resolving to start putting money aside for a possible future attempt at running a nightclub. For the time being, he decided to give retail a try, finding a job at a Stitches store in Yorkville and quickly working his way up to manager there. Not even 20 years of age and looking to start his own business, he launched a clothing line, an entrepreneurial effort in Toronto that mostly consisted of getting the hip clothing stores that catered to the emerging Queen West scene interested in his products. However, realizing it would take years to build a name in fashion, he zeroed in on the nightclub business as his next area of interest.

== Career in hospitality ==
=== Nightclub Ventures ===
In 1984, Khabouth, then 22 years old, purchased a defunct gay club, The Manatee, at 11A St. Joseph Street in the Yonge & Wellesley area. After refurbishment, the venue was launched as Club Z. The financing for the venture was approximately C$30,000, accrued from personal savings, a bank loan secured against his Audi car, and a loan from his stepfather. He acquired the club for C$15,000 and allocated the remaining funds towards interior decor.

Modestly decorated, the basement space incorporated merchandise from Canadian Tire, and Khabouth painted the floors himself. The sound system was rented from Long & McQuade, and to create an industrial aesthetic, the walls were covered with metal sheeting used for heating ducts. The club aimed to establish a diverse patron base by catering to various social strata and musical preferences with events such as house music Saturdays and gay nights on Sundays, serving the nearby Gay Village community.

Despite initial financial difficulties that led to falling behind on rent payments, the club gained significant attention following an incident involving a tiger from a local exotic animal service, which broke a window and resulted in the arrival of police, the Toronto Humane Society, and media. This occurrence, which featured on the front page of the Toronto Star, brought Club Z considerable media attention, thus enhancing its popularity and securing its financial viability.

By 1986, with Club Z generating a steady revenue stream, Khabouth aimed to expand his clientele by targeting the more mature and affluent urban audience. In October 1987, he launched Stilife, located at the corner of Richmond West & Duncan in the previously underutilized former Garment District of Toronto. The club's appeal was enhanced by its design and decor crafted by globally renowned designers, Yabu Pushelberg. Successful in attracting the Bay Street and Rosedale demographic, Stilife played a pivotal role in revitalizing the area, attracting other clubs to the vicinity. This led to a surge in nightlife, resulting in the area's renaming as the Entertainment District, boasting the highest concentration of nightclubs in North America by the mid-1990s.

In the mid-1990s, Khabouth, now well-established as a key figure in Toronto's club scene, sold Stilife due to space limitations and acquired the expansive RPM venue by Lake Ontario. This acquisition also included the adjacent club, the Warehouse. Khabouth renamed the venue as The Guvernment after a thorough refurbishment. However, the venue quickly became a hotspot for the burgeoning rave culture in Toronto due to its vast space, rather than attracting its initially intended high-end crowd. The Guvernment and its adjoining venue, Kool Haus, offered a platform for local and international DJs and regularly hosted live band performances. Despite its name change to Kool Haus in fall 1997, it continued to attract popular touring acts.

=== Restaurants ===
Immediately after his Stilife nightclub made a splash in the late 1980s, Khabouth began opening high-end restaurants in Toronto, seeking to transfer some of the upscale vibe from Stilife into the dining setting. However, especially when compared to his involvement with nightclubs, he's struggled for decades for similar recognition in the dining arena. Most of the criticism centers on the notion that his restaurants feel too much like nightclubs and are excessively flashy with too little substance i.e. exceptional food. Also, the fact that his late 1980s, 1990s, and 2000s eateries, some of them launched to major fanfare, only lasted a few years before either him pulling out of the venture or the venue altogether folding only further fueled the criticism.

Despite significant investment and high profile launches, his partnership with Hanif Harji, a collaboration that began in early 2010s yielding 9 active restaurants as of late 2015, that Khabouth's dining venues such as Patria and Byblos receiving positive critical reviews primarily for their cuisine.

== Personal ==
In 1998, Khabouth married Libby Eber whom he first met during early 1990s while she worked as a hostess in Acrobat, a restaurant he co-owned with Franco Prevedello. They had two kids, son Charlie and daughter Maya, before divorcing in mid 2000s.
