= MasterChef Canada season 7 =

Season of television series

MasterChef Canada
- Season 7
- No. of episodes: 12

Release
- Original network: CTV
- Original release: February 14 – May 16, 2021

Season chronology
- ← Previous; Season 6 Next → Season 8

The seventh season of MasterChef Canada, titled MasterChef Canada: Back to Win, premiered on February 14, 2021, on CTV and concluded on May 16, 2021. Filmed over the summer of 2020, this is an all-star season, featuring a dozen previously eliminated contestants as well as former runners-up from the past six seasons returning to compete once again for a second chance at winning the life-changing title, skipping the auditions entirely.

Chinese-Canadian Markham-based dessert bar and bakery owner Christopher Siu, a fifth place quarterfinalist from Season 2, was crowned the winner, with Season 5 runner-up Andy Hay and Season 4 runner-up Dorothea "Thea" VanHerwaarden finishing as co-runners-up. Siu became the first previously eliminated contestant to win the entire competition. This season (which did not feature outdoor field team challenges such as the Restaurant Takeover or the contestants' family members paying a visit due to pandemic travel restrictions) marks the very first time that three finalists competed in the first-ever three-way finale. It is also the last season narrated by Charlie Ryan and features Aprile, Leung and Bonacini as the original three main judges for the last time.

== Top 12 ==
Except where noted, source for all names, hometowns, and occupations:

Contestant	Age	Hometown	Previous Occupation	Current Occupation	Previous Season and Placement	Status
Christopher Siu	30	Markham, Ontario	Pharmacy student	Bakery owner	Season 2 (5th)	Winner May 16
Andy Hay	34	Dartmouth, Nova Scotia	Small business owner	Food content creator	Season 5 (2nd)	Second Place May 16
Dorothea "Thea" VanHerwaarden	33	Vancouver, British Columbia	Broker	Recipe developer and content creator	Season 4 (2nd)	Second Place May 16
Andrew Al-Khouri	39	Halifax, Nova Scotia	Tax officer	Restaurateur	Season 2 (10th)	Eliminated May 9
Mai Nguyen	32	Edmonton, Alberta	Health and safety advisor	Dumpling business owner	Season 4 (4th)	Eliminated May 2
Jeremy Senaris	39	Winnipeg, Manitoba	Building plan examiner	Private chef	Season 3 (2nd)	Eliminated April 11
Andre Bhagwandat	30	Whitby, Ontario	Hospital housekeeper	Private events and pop-ups	Season 6 (2nd)	Eliminated April 4
Marissa Leon-John	34	Montreal, Quebec	Tech support manager	Private chef	Season 5 (7th)	Eliminated March 28
Barrie McConachie	58	Vancouver, British Columbia	Employee relations consultant	Private chef and culinary events	Season 4 (3rd)	Eliminated March 21; Returned March 7 Eliminated February 21
Jen Jenkins	31	Niagara Falls, Ontario	Stay-at-home mom	culinary student	Season 5 (8th)	Eliminated March 14
April Lee Baker	43	Calgary, Alberta	Homemaker	Private chef and caterer	Season 3 (5th)	Medically Evacuated March 7
Dora Cote	44	Wainwright, Alberta	Plumber	Former restaurateur/plumber	Season 1 (11th)	Eliminated February 14

== Elimination table ==
Place	Contestant	Episode																	
Place	Contestant	1	2			3/4			5	6		7	8		9	10	11		12
1	Christopher	IN	LOW	WIN	IMM	WIN	IMM	IMM	HIGH	IN	WIN	IN	WIN	IMM	LOW	WIN	IN	IN	WINNER
2	Andy	IN	LOW	LOW	IN	WIN^{1}	LOW	PT	HIGH	IN	IN	LOW	IN	IMM	LOW	IN	WIN	IN	RUNNERS-UP
2	Thea	IN	HIGH	IMM	IMM	WIN	IMM	IMM	HIGH	IN	IN	IN	LOW	PT	IN	IN	IN	IN	RUNNERS-UP
4	Andrew	IN	HIGH	IMM	IMM	LOW	PT	IMM	WIN	WIN	IMM	WIN	IN	IMM	HIGH	IN	IN	ELIM	
5	Mai	IN	HIGH	IMM	IMM	LOW	PT	IMM	IN	IN	WIN	IN	WIN	IMM	WIN	ELIM			
6	Jeremy	IN	WIN	IMM	IMM	WIN	IMM	IMM	HIGH	IN	IN	HIGH	LOW	ELIM					
7	Andre	WIN	IMM	IMM	IMM	LOW	LOW	LOW	IN	IN	IN	ELIM							
8	Marissa	LOW	LOW	IN	IMM	WIN	IMM	IMM	LOW	IN	ELIM								
9	Barrie	IN	LOW	LOW	ELIM	LOW	PT	IMM	ELIM										
10	Jen	IN	LOW	WIN	IMM	LOW	LOW	ELIM											
11	April Lee	LOW	LOW	LOW	IN	WDR													
12	Dora	ELIM																	

After April Lee was forced to withdraw due to an injury in episode 3, Barrie was brought back to the competition.
^Note 1This contestant was on the winning team but was selected to compete in the pressure test by their team captain.

(WINNER) This cook won the competition.
(RUNNER-UP) This cook finished in second place.
(WIN) The cook won the individual challenge (Mystery Box Challenge or Elimination Test).
(WIN) The cook was on the winning team in the Team Challenge and was directly advanced to the next round.
(HIGH) The cook was one of the top entries in the Mystery Box Challenge, but did not win, or received considerable praise during an Elimination Test.
(PT) The cook was on the losing team in the Team Challenge or did not win the individual challenge, but won the Pressure Test.
(IN) The cook was not selected as a top entry or bottom entry in an individual challenge.
(IN) The cook was not selected as a top entry or bottom entry in a team challenge.
(IMM) The cook did not have to compete in that round of the competition and was safe from elimination.
(IMM) The cook was selected by Mystery Box Challenge winner and did not have to compete in the Elimination Test.
(PT) The cook was on the losing team in the Team Challenge, competed in the Pressure Test, and advanced.
(NPT) The cook was on the losing team in the Team Challenge, but was exempted from the Pressure Test
(RET) The cook was eliminated but came back to compete to return to the competition.
(LOW) The cook was one of the bottom entries in an individual elimination challenge or a pressure test and advanced.
(LOW) The cook was one of the bottom entries in the Team Challenge, and advanced.
(WDR) The cook was evacuated from the competition.
(ELIM) The cook was eliminated from MasterChef.

== Episodes ==
No. overall	No. in season	Title	Original release date	Prod. code	CAN viewers (millions)	Rank (week)
82	1	"The Dish That Haunts You"	February 14, 2021	701	N/A	TBA
The season opens with a flashback montage recapping the past six seasons. The three judges (Michael, Alvin and Claudio) handpick and personally invite a dozen former competitors to return to the MasterChef Canada kitchen in Toronto, where they will receive a rare second chance at winning the life changing title, trophy and cash prize money. After a close-up of the 12 All-Stars donning their white aprons outdoors, each of the returnees explain what they have been up to since ending their original season's run before entering into the studio, where they jump straight into the competition with the judges introducing the very first Mystery Box elimination challenge, skipping the audition process altogether. Mystery Box 1: The first mystery box elimination cook-off round featured the returning all-star cooks facing their nightmares - one of the worst dishes they cooked during their during their first appearance on their original MasterChef season, consisting of Andre’s Season 6 uni from an opulent East Asian ingredient elimination challenge, because it was much too light on its star ingredient, Andrew’s single poached egg as him overcooking his poached egg in Season 2's egg-themed redemption challenge kept him from returning (although he was originally sent packing for failing to replicate a French fruit tart), Andy’s Season 5 lobster dish from a budget vs. luxury wallet-inspired elimination challenge, which had been ruined by a salty broth compared to seawater, April Lee’s Season 3 Piña Colada dessert from a spirits elimination challenge, which had melted into slush, Barrie’s Wagyu beef from the Season 4 Top 3 semifinals, which he had undercooked, leading to him being sent home in third place despite having the advantage, Christopher’s ground pork patty in his Hawaiian Loco Moco which was very dry and somewhat clumsily put together in an equipment-inspired elimination challenge, leading to his fifth place elimination in Season 2's family-reunion quarterfinals, Dora’s Season 1 beef cheek stew, which Chef Claudio had compared visually to "barf" and was way underseasoned to boot, Jen’s Salisbury steak (although she was originally eliminated in Season 5's three-dish oyster replication Pressure Test), Jeremy’s Season 3 monkfish soup from a fish-themed elimination challenge, which was criticized by Chef Alvin for being too simple and not doing justice to the monkfish, Mai’s poached salmon dish from a mystery box (although she was originally eliminated in fourth place in the Season 4 quarterfinals for having a piece of aluminum in her cotton candy), Marissa’s Asian street food platter from Season 5's tag-team challenge, and Thea’s pork belly and pork cheek tamale Season 4 finale dish, which was overcooked. The chefs were tasked to reinvent their lacklustre dishes from their original season using the main ingredients or parts of the components in them. To raise the stake, one chef was eliminated. Among the many standout dishes, Andre’s dish was deemed the best dish of the day and he received an advantage in the subsequent elimination challenge. The bottom three worst dishes belonged to April Lee, Marissa and Dora. The judges felt that Dora’s somewhat improved beef cheeks sandwich lacked ambition compared to the other two chefs and she was the first returning chef to be eliminated from the competition.
83	2	"Japanese Showdown"	February 21, 2021	702	N/A	TBA
The judges informed the Top 11 that this next challenge features three consecutive, gruelling gauntlet skills test rounds that would evaluate their culinary skills set, accuracy, technique and finesse in terms of replicating each technical skills test challenge to the judges' expectations. Because Andre had the best redemption dish in the previous Mystery Box elimination challenge, he was safe up on the balcony from elimination and did not have to participate in any of the gauntlet skills test rounds for today. Gauntlet Skills Test 1: Japanese Chef Shigeo Kimura visited the MasterChef Canada kitchen as a guest judge to test the remaining 10 chefs' knife skills by demonstrating the process of filleting a snapper usuzukuri dish, consisting of evenly sliced ultra paper thin sashimi. The chefs had 15 minutes to break down, debone and fillet a fresh snapper and replicate the demo to the judges’ sky high standards. Four chefs were saved after the first round. Jeremy presented the best replication dish and was saved first, along with Mai, Andrew, and Thea. Gauntlet Skills Test 2: The remaining chefs had to create their own personalized maki sushi rolls to be safe from the next challenge. The rolls had to be uramaki (rolled inside out) with a tempura element and thinly sliced toppings. Three further chefs were saved. Christopher’s vegetarian maki and Jen’s soy tuna maki were deemed the best and were saved first. Barrie’s maki missed the mark as he added an extra layer of nori on the outside and April Lee’s maki was heavily criticized for her bizarre combination which included salami. This left the judges to choose between Marissa’s sloppily presented but flavourful surf-and-turf maki and Andy’s tempura scallop maki, which contained way too much rice and very little to almost no filling. Marissa was saved. Gauntlet Skills Test 3: Andy, April Lee, and Barrie had to replicate the judges’ okonomiyaki to be safe from elimination. Andy’s dish looked the most appealing visually but was unseasoned. April Lee’s okonomiyaki was to die for, but she broke the pancake when she flipped it haphazardly, while Barrie’s was just slightly undercooked as he took it out of the pan too early. Barrie was eliminated in a very close result.
84	3	"MCC4U Delivery"	March 7, 2021	703	N/A	TBA
Team Challenge 1: At the start of this episode, the judges announced that April Lee had been forced to withdraw from the competition due to a back injury. As a result, Barrie was reinstated to the competition. In the first team challenge, the 10 chefs had to split up into two even teams to five. They were tasked to run their very own customized MasterChef Canada takeout food delivery app, cooking indoors to whip up three takeout entrees: a protein-forward, vegetable-forward, and starch-forward savoury dish. The judges first asked each of the contestants to name their biggest threats in the competition. Barrie and Christopher named Andre; Andre and Andrew both said Christopher; Marissa named Andrew, Jen named Andy, Jeremy picked Mai, while Mai, Andy and Thea all said that Jeremy was their biggest threat. With the most contestants naming Jeremy (who did the very best job in the first round of the previous Japanese skills test), he was chosen as the Red Team captain. As he named Mai (who also did exceptional in the previous three-round skills test) as his biggest rival, she was chosen as the Blue Team captain. Jeremy selected Andy, Christopher, Thea and Marissa, while Mai selected Andre, Andrew, Jen and was left with Barrie. The Red Team served a chicken karaage poke bowl, Asian charred eggplants and Filipino sweet potato noodles, while the Blue Team served jerk chicken wings, mushroom tacos and a pork tenderloin cold soba noodle salad. Overall, the food was very well received with some minor criticism pointed to the Red Team's smaller portion sizes and the Blue Team's bland mushroom tacos. With the highest rating of 4.1 out of 5 stars versus the Blue team's 3.8, the Red Team narrowly won the team challenge and briefly celebrated their short-lived victory before the judges dismissed the 10 contestants to get some rest at the end of the episode.
85	4	"Pressure, Italian Style"	March 14, 2021	704	N/A	TBA
Pressure Test 1, Part 1: All five members of the losing Blue Team faced a two-round, Italian food-themed pressure test, in which one of them was sent home. Before the pressure test commenced, the judges dropped a huge, shocking bombshell by announcing that not everyone on the winning team was safe from elimination. As the winning team captain. Jeremy was ordered by the judges to name which winning Red Team member he would to send to join the Blue Team in the pressure test. Jeremy strategically sent Andy to join Mai, Andre, Andrew, Barrie and Jen, exempting himself, Christopher, Thea and Marissa. The first cook-off featured replicating handmade fresh pasta by making it from scratch using the well method. Michael's son Oscar Bonacini visited the MasterChef Canada kitchen as a special guest judge to demonstrate three types of pasta for the chefs to replicate: capunti in a tomato-basil sauce; lorighittas in a herb butter sauce; and trofie in a pesto sauce. The judges announced that this first cook-off round was a head-to-head battle. Andy got to decide which pairs of two would be replicating which pasta dishes. He chose to compete against Barrie in capunti, and paired up Andre and Mai to compete with lorighittas, leaving Andrew to cook off against Jen in replicating pesto trofie by default. Each judge decided the winner of one head-to-head match. Alvin deemed Jen’s underdone trofie to be rock hard, compounded by the sloppy, messy plating despite having a vibrant grass green sauce and masterfully shaping it well while Andrew’s perfectly cooked, al dente pasta was misshaped inconsistently and his well-seasoned, herbaceous pesto had a muddy brown-gray colour to it. Ultimately, Andrew was sent up to safety first for his better execution in the flavours. Claudio decided to save Mai as her quality of work outshined Andre’s lorighittas, which were raw in the middle due to time mismanagement. Lastly, Barrie’s and Andy’s capunti were near perfection, but Michael preferred Barrie’s more vibrant, acidic tomato sauce because Andy clumsily put way too much garlic and basil, as well as adding the grated cheese in too early, thereby giving Barrie the win. Pressure Test 1, Part 2: Andy, Andre and Jen cooked in the second round of the Italian food-themed pressure test in a bid for survival. They had 1 hour to reinvent three classic Italian dishes. In a random selection after a drink of sgroppino, Andy was given eggplant parmigiana, Andre received chicken cacciatore, and Jen got veal saltimbocca. Halfway during the cook-off, the judges paused the clock to throw another mid-challenge curveball plot twist with the task of an extra, added in dish, declaring that they also needed to prepare a second contorno dish to complement their main course. Andy’s crispy, charred and fried eggplant baba ganoush with a Parmesan crisp and orange & fresh burrata salad were raved, sending to the safety of the balcony first. Andre’s deep-fried chicken cacciatore was also raved, but the judges found his buttermilk frisée salad underwhelming because of its simplicity. Jen’s rabbit saltimbocca and seared zucchini & rapini salad were liked, but her rabbit was slightly overcooked and dry, which resulted in her elimination.
86	5	"Plant-Based Paradise"	March 21, 2021	705	N/A	TBA
Mystery Box 2: The chefs faced another mystery box elimination challenge, in which they had one hour to bring a modern twist to classic comfort dishes using only vegan, plant-based ingredients. Andrew’s peaches and cream vegan dessert was raved as the best dish of the night and he received a big advantage in the subsequent challenge. Jeremy’s "pork" lumpia, Andy’s flourless chocolate and black bean torte, Thea’s stuffed agnolotti, and Christopher’s coconut tofu pudding were also well-received. Andre’s Jamaican "chorizo" patties had dry fillings, while Mai’s sweet carrot cake dumplings were unappealing in colours. The worst two dishes were Barrie’s bland and stale Mediterranean pie and Marissa’s gummy, chewy beet kofta. Barrie was sent home once again, this time for good.
87	6	"Kitchenary!"	March 28, 2021	706	N/A	TBA
Quiz Challenge: The chefs competed in a game show challenge called Kitchenary! The judges quizzed them of their knowledge of culinary ingredients and techniques, with each correct answer giving them 10 points and an incorrect answer costing them 5 points, and the chef that had the highest score at the end won immunity from elimination. Because Andrew won the previous Mystery Box challenge, he received a 20 point head start. At the end of the challenge, Andrew won immunity with 65 points. Elimination Test 1: The seven remaining cooks had one hour to cook a dish by selecting two of some of the cooking techniques/ingredients that were mentioned in Kitchenary!, going from second place (Christopher) to last place (Thea), with Andrew breaking any ties. Christopher chose the siphon and pandan, Andy chose the pomelo and the mandoline, Marissa picked the tamarind and en papillote, Mai selected the velouté and galangal, Andre chose the cassava and flambé, Jeremy selected emulsify and the spiralizer, and Thea picked the tortilla press and tomatillo. Christopher's "Into the Ravine" dessert and Mai's seafood banh beo with galangal velouté were both raved and they were both named winners of this elimination challenge, joining Andrew on the balcony. Andy's pomelo pop dessert, Andre's cassava baked Alaska and Thea's toma-tostada inversion with halibut ceviche were also praised by the judges. Jeremy's pan-seared cod with potato two ways and calamansi beurre blanc was lambasted for having very little to almost no sauce (after he split his first batch) and being lacklustre with a confusing concept because he did not honour the key ingredient by wasting his time on superfluous garnishes. After the judges deliberated, they singled out Marissa and called her up to the front alone for ruining her Tuna en Papillote with tamarind coconut, which she served without the paper bag, making it lose its aroma, steam and moisture, causing the dish to be dry, and rather than putting people in the bottom based on their performances, the judges immediately eliminated Marissa without even going for a bottom three, skipping the nomination process entirely.
88	7	"Food of the Future"	April 4, 2021	707	N/A	TBA
Mystery Box 3: The Top 7 faced their third mystery box elimination challenge, in which they had one hour to make a dish using sustainable ingredients sourced by IKEA Canada, including squab, salmon, cactus, prickly pear, yellow dragon fruit, enoki mushrooms, okra and even crickets. Halfway during the cook-off, the judges threw another gobsmacking mid-challenge curveball plot twist by revealing four more ingredients: Kalles Kaviar (Cod roe spread), whole grain mustard, lingonberry jam and dark chocolate, at least one of which the chefs had to include in their dish. Andrew’s pan-seared, cricket-crusted salmon with chickpea hummus purée and beet-cricket tuiles won him his second mystery box. Jeremy’s squab Sotanghon was the second best dish, whilst Christopher’s cricket mushroom medley, Thea’s pan-seared salmon with sweet potato purée and chocolate crickets and Mai’s seared squab with lingonberry-glazed beets were also very well-received. Andy’s salmon fish cakes with dragon fruit pico de gallo and lingonberry jelly tasted great but he was heavily criticized for his sloppy, messy plating. Andre’s cricket-crusted salmon with grilled cactus and pumpkin curry sauce containing the mustard was deemed subpar with a salty sauce and slightly overcooked salmon among other technical issues. With the weakest dish, Andre was eliminated in seventh place, becoming the first former runner-up to the eliminated.
89	8	"Seafood Extravaganza"	April 11, 2021	708	N/A	TBA
Elimination Test 2: The Top 6 faced the classic MasterChef tag-team challenge, in which they had 1 hour to replicate a complex luxurious seafood platter composed of six shellfish dishes: steamed mussels in a white wine broth, fritto misto with aioli, grilled sardines, stuffed squids, red snapper ceviche and scallop Coquilles Saint Jacques. With his previous mystery box win, Andrew was given the advantage of choosing the teams. Targeting to eliminate Jeremy and Mai, he picked Andy as his teammate because they were from Halifax, as well as familiar with seafood. Andrew paired Mai with Christopher, leaving Jeremy with Thea (who had a shellfish allergy) by default. In the end, Andrew and Andy’s platter was largely praised with a few minor imperfections, including very sloppy, hastily assembled and messy plating, missing aioli, an overcooked fritto misto and a soggy ceviche that lacked acidity. Mai and Christopher’s platter was raved, although a bone was found in their ceviche and their fritto misto needed more frying. Jeremy and Thea’s platter fared the worst with no fritto misto, no aioli, no spiralized potato fries over their badly overcooked mussels (which were inedibly burnt), clumsily done scallops and a horrendous ceviche. Mai and Christopher were declared winners of the challenge, while Jeremy and Thea faced elimination. Pressure Test 2: As the losing team, Jeremy and Thea faced a head-to-head pressure test to determine which of them would leave the competition. They had just 15 minutes to make two classic beef dishes: steak au poivre and steak tartare. Both beef tartares were almost flawless, but Thea’s steak au poivre was deemed to be slightly better than Jeremy’s due to his split sauce. Therefore, much to everyone’s shock, Jeremy was sent home, becoming the second former runner-up to be eliminated.
90	9	"Guess Who’s Coming to Dinner"	April 18, 2021	709	N/A	TBA
Team Challenge 2: The Top 5 chefs were tasked with working together as one group to prep, cook, plate and execute a 5-course tasting menu, with each member cooking individually for a high-end, fine dining dinner banquet for eight anonymous culinary insiders. The five chefs agreed on an Italian-inspired menu, although Mai and Thea butted heads, wanting to serve a stuffed pasta dish and decided to go ahead with their dishes, regardless of concerns of repetitiveness. Throughout the 1 hour cook-off, Thea nearly fainted from the pressure and required medical attention, but finished the challenge. At the end of the cook, the judges reveal the VIP guests were the chefs themselves and the 3 judges, and all five ranked each other’s dishes. Andrew presented the first course, which was a take on a Caprese salad. He was praised for his plating skills with some minor criticism pointed to his smoked tomatoes, which lacked acidity, the skin being too chewy and the lack of punchy flavours from the basil. Mai was second, and her seafood cappelletti was greatly enjoyed by all the chefs and judges, with the only minor criticism being the superfluous usage of 2 types of shellfish. Andy was third, and his patatas bravas with octopus was too heavy with a slightly tough octopus, and was considered odd because it was a Spanish dish. Thea had the fourth course, and her ravioli doppi was also complimented, but she was criticized for her choice of skirt steak, and the judges pointed out that two pasta dishes on one tasting menu was not so fitting, which the chefs agreed with. Christopher presented the final course, and his truffle-vanilla bean ice cream with chocolate caramel mini-pastry brownie received polarized reviews, with some rave praise for his adventurous ingenuity and boldness, but criticism for the bizarrely confusing, clashing flavours in his ice cream. Mai’s dish was ranked the best, followed by Andrew in second place and Thea in third. Andy's dish placed fourth, meaning Christopher received last place. The judges announced that there was no elimination for today, dismissing all five cooks to get some rest, although Mai would receive an advantage in next week's challenge while Christopher would be at a disadvantage.
91	10	"The Sweet Taste of Success"	May 2, 2021	710	N/A	TBA
Elimination Test 3: For their next elimination challenge, the 5 quarterfinalists were presented with the finale desserts that each of the six previous season winners had baked in their respective finales and had to bake a new dessert using the exact same ingredients, but putting their very own unique spin and fresh interpretation in them. The judges invited season 3 winner Mary Berg as the guest judge. Because Mai won the previous challenge, she had the first pick, while Christopher had the last pick. Mai picked Mary's blueberry financier with buttermilk corn ice cream, Andrew chose Trevor Connie's fallen mint chocolate ice cream cone, Thea selected David Jorge's lemon curd parfait, Andy picked Beccy Stables' fallen apple panna cotta, the dish he lost to, and lastly Christopher chose Eric Chong's Asian-inspired Thai banana split. The chefs had 75 minutes to bake their desserts, but 15 minutes into the bake-off, the judges paused the clock by throwing a curveball of an extra added in dish. They announced that they also wanted a palate-cleansing side dish as well. Christopher's banana split Gateau St. Honore was raved as the very best dessert of the day and he handily won the baking challenge. Thea's chamomile panna cotta with blackberry sorbet were also highly praised, leaving her successfully safe from elimination. Andrew's hot fudge brownie with tahini ice cream were well-received for their great-tasting wonderful contrasts flavour profiles with combinations complimenting each other, but the judges also criticized Andrew for his simplicity by playing it too safe. Andy's spiced panna cotta with a poached glazed apple received lukewarm, mixed reviews as the apple's chunky skin was hard as rocks, making it chewy and difficult to eat, with over-sweet syrup and a mushy texture for the granita while Mai's cornbread cake with blueberry mousse was heavily criticized for having a sloppy, messy appearance, lacking technique and finesse and for missing the lemongrass component. In a great shock, Mai was eliminated in fifth place.
92	11	"Ordinary to Extraordinary"	May 9, 2021	711	N/A	TBA
Skills Test 4: The Top 4 semifinalists were told that this season, for the first time in MasterChef Canada history, the three-way finale will consist of three finalists and only one semifinalist will be eliminated at the end of the penultimate semifinals. The chefs' first challenge featured three skill-testing rounds and that the winner would be given an advantage in the last elimination challenge. Each judge demonstrates a skill, such as a mirepoix of aromatics uniformly diced by Claudio, Alvin unveiling how to break down a coconut, and Michael laying out a trussed trio of chicken, roast beef, and trout. The chefs had to replicate all three judges' demo displays to move on to the next part of the challenge. Christopher finished the first skill-testing challenge first, followed by Thea and Andy, who move onto the next round. In the next round, Christopher maintained his lead and finished first, followed by Andy, leaving both of them in the final skill-testing challenge. In the final round, in addition to trussing all three proteins, the two chefs had to also gut and stuff their trout within ten minutes. Neither chef finished their trout on time, but as always, technique was key and Andy won the season's last skills-test challenge. Elimination Test 4: In the last elimination challenge, the chefs had 75 minutes to demonstrate their culinary range by elevating one of four simple, humble ingredients that were common staples to its most flavourful, exotic peaks: Onions, carrots, cabbages, and beets, in a three-dish tasting menu. As the winner of the preceding skills-test challenge, Andy got to assign each of the chefs' feature ingredient. He chose carrots for himself, gave onions for Thea, assigned cabbages for Andrew, leaving Christopher with beets. Andy had good feedback on his dishes, aside from the carrots getting lost in the curry sauce for his duck breast dish. Thea was also praised for her plating; while Michael and Alvin complemented her onion dishes, Claudio was very disappointed with her third onion dish, which he found to be very lacklustre for it'ss mundane simplicity. Christopher's dishes notably were less well-composed than usual. While Michael and Alvin found his beet dishes tasty, Claudio felt that the beet sorbet was overambitious with a confusing concept. Andrew's cabbage pakora fritters with curried chutney were raved by Claudio (who also praised Andrew's plating), but Michael felt let down by the mediocre, unseasoned cabbage rolls, which tasted bland as they were overpowered by the acidic tomato sauce and creamy creme fraiche while Alvin disliked how Andrew's misuse of canned luncheon meat ruined his Choucroute Garnie, compounded by unseasoned and undercooked sauerkraut, with the composition rustic. Following a lengthy deliberation, the judges announced that Andrew would be the semifinalist eliminated from the competition. After Andrew headed home, Andy, Thea, and Christopher secured the three spots in the three-way finale.
93	12	"Back to Win Finale"	May 16, 2021	712	N/A	TBA
In the finale, Andy, Thea and Christopher were given three straight hours to work non-stop, preparing a three-course meal for the judges, and had to serve their appetizer after the first hour, entree after the second, and dessert after the third. At the end of the cook-off, they would be judged in private. Unlike previous finales, which featured the finalists' family members in the ring-like finale arena, only the previously eliminated contestants were able to spectate in this year's finale, which featured a brief pre-recorded video message from the finalists' families due to the lockdowns. For the appetizer, Andy served a seafood platter, consisting of a seared scallop, pickled mussels, fried oyster caviar, and green apple vinaigrette, while Thea made a torched red snapper crudo with a buttermilk whey foam, masa tuile, and compressed cucumbers, and Christopher presented a spot prawn ceviche with a tom kha gai ice cream, tomato tuile, and calamansi chili marinade. For the entree, Andy presented a lobster roll with a compressed choux bun, salt and vinegar chips, and a white wine sabayon, while Christopher made a seared duck breast with a smoked egg, taro nest, beet jus, and celeriac puree, and Thea served a sous vide venison loin with a poblano mole, pepita verde, and pan-roasted Tokyo turnips. For dessert, Christopher presented his take on mango pomelo sago, consisting of a mango cheesecake foam, coconut snow, and passion fruit meringue, Andy served a blueberry grunt with a lemon vanilla gelato ring, toasted meringue, and a thyme-toasted vanilla cake, and Thea made her take on a hibiscus margarita, consisting of a hibiscus panna cotta, habanero ice cream, coriander sponge cake, and tequila-infused melon balls. The judges were blown away with the 3 finalists' overall menus, and announced that they would all receive the Chef’s Culinary Package of Miele range appliances. After reviewing all three meals, the judges deemed that Christopher left the most lasting impression with his tasting menu, officially declaring and crowning him the life-changing title winner of Canada's next MasterChef champion, in addition to awarding Christopher the trophy and the $100,000 cash prize money.

== See also ==
- MasterChef: Back to Win
