= MasterChef: Back to Win =

MasterChef: Back to Win is a format within the MasterChef franchise in which contestants from previous seasons (either of the main show or its junior series) compete for a second time. Two seasons of the Australian series and one each of the American series and the Canadian series have used the name.

- MasterChef Australia series 12 aired in Australia in 2020
- MasterChef Canada season 7 aired in Canada in 2021
- MasterChef season 12 aired in the United States in 2022
- MasterChef Australia series 17 aired in Australia in 2025
