= List of MasterChef Canada episodes =

The following is a list of episodes of the Canadian cooking show MasterChef Canada. The series premiered on January 20, 2014, on the CTV network.

== Series overview ==
Season	Episodes	Originally released	
Season	Episodes	First released	Last released
1	15	January 20, 2014	April 28, 2014
2	15	February 1, 2015	May 24, 2015
3	15	February 14, 2016	June 19, 2016
4	12	March 2, 2017	June 1, 2017
5	12	April 3, 2018	June 19, 2018
6	12	April 8, 2019	June 10, 2019
7	12	February 14, 2021	May 16, 2021

== Episodes ==
=== Season 1 (2014) ===
No. overall	No. in season	Title	Original release date	Prod. code	CAN viewers (millions)	Rank (week)
1	1	"White is the New Black"	January 20, 2014	101	1.777	11
2	2	"Chicken Little"	January 27, 2014	102	1.653	14
3	3	"First Kick at the Box"	February 3, 2014	103	1.824	10
4	4	"The Puck Drops Here"	February 10, 2014	104	1.654	7
5	5	"Where's the Beef"	February 17, 2014	105	1.999	9
6	6	"Edible Art"	February 24, 2014	106	1.618	20
7	7	"Brains Before Beauty"	March 3, 2014	107	1.853	16
8	8	"Major Steaks"	March 10, 2014	108	1.885	12
9	9	"Great Canadian Bake-Off"	March 17, 2014	109	1.784	11
10	10	"Meals on Wheels"	March 24, 2014	110	1.833	11
11	11	"Claws Out"	March 31, 2014	111	1.777	15
12	12	"Line of Fire"	April 7, 2014	112	1.820	13
13	13	"Family Style"	April 14, 2014	113	1.842	7
14	14	"Not Your Average Joe"	April 21, 2014	114	1.936	8
15	15	"And Then There Were 2"	April 28, 2014	115	2.216	7

=== Season 2 (2015) ===
Season 2 premiered on CTV on February 1, 2015, following its telecast of Super Bowl XLIX. The premiere was originally meant to air on February 8, 2015, but was pushed ahead to air after the game in place of Spun Out, whose second-season premiere was pulled from the slot after cast member J. P. Manoux was charged with voyeurism.

No. overall	No. in season	Title	Original release date	Prod. code	CAN viewers (millions)	Rank (week)
16	1	"Fit to Be Tied"	February 1, 2015	201	1.569	15
17	2	"Patriotic Pantry"	February 8, 2015	202	1.541	25
18	3	"Constant Cravings"	February 15, 2015	203	1.513	29
19	4	"Juggling Act"	March 1, 2015	204	1.448	22
20	5	"Slice of Life"	March 8, 2015	205	1.684	15
21	6	"One Potato, Two Potato"	March 22, 2015	206	1.659	10
22	7	"No Piece of Cake"	March 29, 2015	207	1.594	16
23	8	"Wedding on the Waves"	April 5, 2015	208	1.652	12
24	9	"Good Things in Small Packages"	April 12, 2015	209	1.814	13
25	10	"Walking on Eggshells"	April 19, 2015	210	1.611	13
26	11	"Tea for Two"	April 26, 2015	211	1.637	21
27	12	"Fine Dining Under Fire"	May 3, 2015	212	1.603	17
28	13	"From Home, With Love"	May 10, 2015	213	2.050	7
29	14	"The Trip to Bountiful"	May 17, 2015	214	1.462	19
30	15	"Ring of Fire"	May 24, 2015	215	2.079	4

=== Season 3 (2016) ===
No. overall	No. in season	Title	Original release date	Prod. code	CAN viewers (millions)	Rank (week)
31	1	"Yes, No, Maybe So"	February 14, 2016	301	1.229	25
32	2	"A Cut Above"	February 21, 2016	302	1.427	17
33	3	"At Home and Abroad"	March 6, 2016	303	1.554	14
34	4	"Trial By Fire"	March 13, 2016	304	1.388	15
35	5	"Off the Hook"	March 20, 2016	305	1.539	13
36	6	"Feast your eyes"	March 27, 2016	306	1.332	17
37	7	"From the Heart"	April 10, 2016	307	1.330	18
38	8	"Oktoberfest Feast"	April 17, 2016	308	1.343	17
39	9	"Head and Shoulders, Knees and Toes"	April 24, 2016	309	1.408	18
40	10	"Out of This World"	May 1, 2016	310	1.407	15
41	11	"Demon at the Pass"	May 8, 2016	311	1.429	16
42	12	"Cooking With Cocktails"	May 29, 2016	312	1.444	6
43	13	"Meals and Wheels"	June 5, 2016	313	1.416	4
44	14	"Only the Best"	June 12, 2016	314	1.450	4
45	15	"Season 3 Finale"	June 19, 2016	315	1.506	2

=== Season 4 (2017) ===
No. overall	No. in season	Title	Original release date	Prod. code	CAN viewers (millions)	Rank (week)
46	1	"Special Delivery"	March 2, 2017	401	1.492	4
47	2	"Home On the Range"	March 9, 2017	402	1.273	16
48	3	"True Patriot Love"	March 16, 2017	403	1.178	16
49	4	"The Blind Leading the Blind"	March 23, 2017	404	1.368	8
50	5	"Burger for Bikers"	March 30, 2017	405	1.191	18
51	6	"Jamie in the House"	April 6, 2017	406	1.215	18
52	7	"Egg Showdown!"	April 13, 2017	407	1.263	16
53	8	"Auberge Anniversary"	April 27, 2017	408	1.282	12
54	9	"Take Five"	May 4, 2017	409	1.296	17
55	10	"Harvest Family Dinner"	May 11, 2017	410	1.414	14
56	11	"Sweet Francaise"	May 25, 2017	411	1.226	7
57	12	"Season 4 Finale"	June 1, 2017	412	1.412	5

=== Season 5 (2018) ===
No. overall	No. in season	Title	Original release date	Prod. code	CAN viewers (millions)	Rank (week)
58	1	"Opportunity Knocks"	April 3, 2018	501	1.211	21
59	2	"How Do You Take Your Mystery Box?"	April 10, 2018	502	1.166	22
60	3	"Building an Appetite"	April 17, 2018	503	1.175	19
61	4	"Fast and Epicure-ious"	April 24, 2018	504	1166	13
62	5	"Barker's Dozen"	May 1, 2018	505	1.023	27
63	6	"Vive La Pressure Test"	May 8, 2018	506	1.175	20
64	7	"The Magnificent Seven"	May 15, 2018	507	1.162	17
65	8	"Cooking with (Corner) Gas"	May 22, 2018	508	1.187	7
66	9	"On the Line of Fire"	May 29, 2018	509	1.085	7
67	10	"Guess Who's Coming to Dinner?"	June 5, 2018	510	1.260	5
68	11	"Pop-Up Star"	June 12, 2018	511	1.193	5
69	12	"Three Courses, One Crown"	June 19, 2018	512	1.345	3

=== Season 6 (2019) ===
No. overall	No. in season	Title	Original release date	Prod. code	CAN viewers (millions)	Rank (week)
70	1	"Masterchef Canada Invitational"	April 8, 2019	601	1.128	16
71	2	"Home Cooks, Your Roots Are Showing"	April 8, 2019	602	1.200	10
72	3	"Top Hats and Tails"	April 15, 2019	603	0.917	25
73	4	"Tastes Like Teen Spirit"	April 22, 2019	604	0.931	27
74	5	"School Lunch!"	April 29, 2019	605	0.978	25
75	6	"Risk and Reward"	May 6, 2019	606	0.888	30>
76	7	"Knife Fight!"	May 13, 2019	607	1.018	20
77	8	"Into the Fire"	May 20, 2019	608	0.964	15
78	9	"Wheel of Fruit"	May 27, 2019	609	1.069	9
79	10	"Gifts from the Earth"	May 27, 2019	610	1.094	6
80	11	"Fire and Ice"	June 3, 2019	611	1.344	2
81	12	"Final Showdown"	June 10, 2019	612	1.445	1

=== Season 7 (2021) ===
No. overall	No. in season	Title	Original release date	Prod. code	CAN viewers (millions)	Rank (week)
82	1	"The Dish That Haunts You"	February 14, 2021	701	N/A	TBA
83	2	"Japanese Showdown"	February 21, 2021	702	N/A	TBA
84	3	"MCC4U Delivery"	March 7, 2021	703	N/A	TBA
85	4	"Pressure, Italian Style"	March 14, 2021	704	N/A	TBA
86	5	"Plant-Based Paradise"	March 21, 2021	705	N/A	TBA
87	6	"Kitchenary!"	March 28, 2021	706	N/A	TBA
88	7	"Food of the Future"	April 4, 2021	707	N/A	TBA
89	8	"Seafood Extravaganza"	April 11, 2021	708	N/A	TBA
90	9	"Guess Who’s Coming to Dinner"	April 18, 2021	709	N/A	TBA
91	10	"The Sweet Taste of Success"	May 2, 2021	710	N/A	TBA
92	11	"Ordinary to Extraordinary"	May 9, 2021	711	N/A	TBA
93	12	"Back to Win Finale"	May 16, 2021	712	N/A	TBA
