= MasterChef Canada season 5 =

Season of television series

MasterChef Canada
- Season 5
- No. of episodes: 12

Release
- Original network: CTV
- Original release: April 3 – June 19, 2018

Season chronology
- ← Previous; Season 4 Next → Season 6

The fifth season of MasterChef Canada originally aired on April 3, 2018, on CTV and concluded on June 19. Filming began in early September of 2017 and ended in November 2017. Sherwood Park resident Rebecca "Beccy" Stables (originally from Grimsby, England) won the trophy, title and $100,000 prize money. At the age of 19, Stables became the youngest winner in the history of MasterChef Canada, a title she currently holds, and tied the record for being the youngest contestant ever to appear and compete on the show. Following her victory, she relocated to Kelowna, British Columbia, where her family operates a private cheffing and catering small business gig and she currently runs a dessert baking website and blog called dessertclub. Stables also guest-starred in an episode of the sixth season. This season aired on June 26, 2018, on TLC in India.

Season 5 Runner-up Andy Hay, Marissa Leon-John and Jennifer "Jen" Jenkins, who finished in seventh and eighth place respectively, all returned to MasterChef Canada: Back to Win. Jen placed tenth, Marissa placed eighth, and Andy finished as the co-runner-up.

== Top 12 ==
Contestant	Age	Hometown	Occupation	Status
Rebecca "Beccy" Stables	19	Sherwood Park, Alberta	Tile setter assistant	Winner June 19
Andy Hay	31	Dartmouth, Nova Scotia	Small business owner	Runner-Up June 19
Michael Griffiths	24	Richmond Hill, Ontario	Mathematician	Eliminated June 12
Nadia Rehman	26	Markham, Ontario	Account executive	Eliminated June 5
Eugene Cheng	35	Victoria, British Columbia	Financial advisor	Eliminated June 5
Kaegan Donnelly	28	Vancouver, British Columbia	Software sales	Eliminated May 29; Returned May 8 Eliminated April 17
Marissa Leon-John	31	Dollard-des-Ormeaux, Québec	Tech support manager	Eliminated May 22
Jen Jenkins	28	Dawson Creek, British Columbia	Stay-at-home mom	Eliminated May 15
Jonathan Rahim	33	Winnipeg, Manitoba	Real estate agent	Eliminated May 8
Michael Varga	39	Vancouver, British Columbia	Firefighter	Eliminated May 1
Reem Ahmed	26	Toronto, Ontario	Biomedical engineer	Eliminated April 24
Melissa Skowron	32	Calgary, Alberta	Facilities coordinator	Eliminated April 10

== Elimination table ==
Place	Contestant	Episode																		
Place	Contestant	2		3	4		5	6			R	7	8		9	10		11		12
1	Beccy	HIGH	LOW	WIN	IN	IN	WIN	WIN	IMM	IMM	IMM	PT	HIGH	IN	PT	WIN	LOW	WIN	IMM	WINNER
2	Andy	IN	IN	WIN	IN	WIN	NPT	IN	IMM	IMM	IMM	WIN	WIN	IMM	WIN	HIGH	WIN	IN	PT	RUNNER-UP
3	Michael G.	HIGH	IMM	PT	WIN	IMM	LOW	IN	IMM	IMM	IMM	WIN	IN	WIN	WIN	HIGH	WIN	IN	ELIM	
4	Nadia	IN	IMM	PT	HIGH	LOW	NPT	LOW	IN	IMM	IMM	WIN	HIGH	LOW	WIN	IN	ELIM			
4	Eugene	IN	IMM	WIN	IN	WIN	LOW	WIN	IMM	IMM	IMM	WIN	IN	IN	LOW	IN	ELIM			
6	Kaegan	WIN	IMM	ELIM							RET	LOW	IN	WIN	ELIM					
7	Marissa	IN	IN	WIN	IN	WIN	WIN	LOW	LOW	IN	IMM	WIN	IN	ELIM						
8	Jen	IN	IMM	WIN	IN	IN	PT	LOW	IN	IMM	IMM	ELIM								
9	Jonathan	IN	WIN	WIN	IN	LOW	WIN	LOW	LOW	ELIM										
10	Michael V.	IN	WIN	NPT	HIGH	IN	ELIM													
11	Reem	IN	IMM	LOW	IN	ELIM														
12	Melissa	IN	ELIM																	

(WINNER) This cook won the competition.
(RUNNER-UP) This cook finished in second place.
(WIN) The cook won the individual challenge (Mystery Box Challenge or Elimination Test).
(WIN) The cook was on the winning team in the Team Challenge and was directly advanced to the next round.
(HIGH) The cook was one of the top entries in the Mystery Box Challenge, but did not win, or received considerable praise during an Elimination Test.
(PT) The cook was on the losing team in the Team Challenge or did not win the individual challenge, but won the Pressure Test.
(IN) The cook was not selected as a top entry or bottom entry in an individual challenge.
(IN) The cook was not selected as a top entry or bottom entry in a team challenge.
(IMM) The cook did not have to compete in that round of the competition and was safe from elimination.
(IMM) The cook was selected by Mystery Box Challenge winner and did not have to compete in the Elimination Test.
(PT) The cook was on the losing team in the Team Challenge, competed in the Pressure Test, and advanced.
(NPT) The cook was on the losing team in the Team Challenge, but was exempted from the Pressure Test
(RET) The cook was eliminated but returned to the competition.
(LOW) The cook was one of the bottom entries in an individual elimination challenge or pressure test and advanced.
(LOW) The cook was one of the bottom entries in the Team Challenge, and advanced.
(ELIM) The cook was eliminated from MasterChef.

== Episodes ==
No. overall	No. in season	Title	Original release date	Prod. code	CAN viewers (millions)	Rank (week)
58	1	"Opportunity Knocks"	April 3, 2018	501	1.211	21
Similar to last season's qualifying round, the three judges (Michael Bonacini, Alvin Leung, & Claudio Aprile) hit the road, travelled cross-country and went door-knocking at the residences and workplaces of the twenty-one applicants, who were surprised to be visited in their hometowns by each judge, who tasked them with selecting a simple, humble, key staple ingredient to showcase in their signature audition dish. In the qualifying white apron audition battle round in the MasterChef Canada kitchen, another announcement was made: at any time during the hour-long cook-off, contestants could randomly be eliminated by getting a tap on their shoulder; this was the case for Dawn and Oyakhire. While walking around and sampling the nineteen dishes, Beccy, Jonathan and Andy instantly earned three express white aprons from the judges for having made the very best audition dishes of the day. After sampling the other dishes, the judges called eight more competitors to take a step forward - Jen, Kaegan, Marissa, Melissa, Michael G., Michael V., Nadia and Reem - and they were all given aprons and spots in the Top 12 for whipping up dishes that were satisfactory enough. Of the remaining cooks, Sienna, Mike, Layla, Claudia, & Nikita were eliminated, while Eugene (who over-ambitiously overthought & overcomplicated his dish), Felix (whose dish was too simple) and Peter (whose sauce broke) were given a second chance, tasked to star the same ingredient in a new dish. Felix's dish was criticized, while Eugene and Peter both received praise and criticism. The judges ultimately decided that Eugene's redemption dish, which initially suffered from over-ambition, was the most promising. Eugene was awarded the final apron, rounding out the Top 12, thereby sending both Felix and Peter home.
59	2	"How Do You Take Your Mystery Box?"	April 10, 2018	502	1.166	22
Mystery Box 1: The very first Mystery Box challenge of the season featured coffee beans as the main ingredient. Half of the Top 12 home cooks were tasked with making a savoury dish while the other half had to make a sweet dish highlighting and featuring coffee as the star of their dish. Kaegan, Beccy and Michael G. made the top three best dishes, and Kaegan won the challenge. Elimination Test 1: As the winner of the Mystery Box, Kaegan was immune from elimination. He also got to choose to save some of the other home cooks who either made "savoury" or "sweet" dishes from the previous challenge. Targeting Beccy, he decided to save the other home cooks who made savoury dishes, saving Michael G., Eugene, Nadia, Jen and Reem from elimination. In the subsequent elimination challenge, the remaining contestants had to prepare a dish by purchasing ingredients from the pantry using either a budget wallet, which allowed them to spend no more than $10, or a luxury wallet, which required them to spend at least $50, with Kaegan assigning the wallets. Kaegan gave the budget wallet to Melissa, Marissa, and Jonathan, and gave the luxury wallet to Michael V., Beccy and Andy. Jonathan and Michael V. made the two best dishes, making team captains for their first off-site team challenge. Marissa and Andy also did well enough to be saved, despite the fact that the latter's well-executed lobster dish had an extremely salty, bitter sauce leaving Melissa and Beccy in the bottom. Melissa was the first to be eliminated.
60	3	"Building an Appetite"	April 17, 2018	503	1.175	19
Team Challenge 1: The home cooks faced their first off-site team challenge, in which they were tasked with preparing a hearty meal for 101 Habitat for Humanity volunteers, who were building homes at a construction site just outside of Toronto. Split into two teams, they were given two hours to create a family-style meal using various cuts of chicken, with hungry volunteers deciding their favorite meal by casting votes. As the winner with the best dish of the last elimination challenge, Jonathan was given the option of picking either the protein or his team first - he chose to pick a team member first. Michael V. chose the dark meat, leaving the white meat to Jonathan, who chose Eugene, Marissa, Andy and Jen, forming the Red Team, while Michael V. chose Michael G., Nadia, Reem and Kaegan, forming the Blue Team. As the last home cook standing, Beccy chose to join the Red team. The Red Team won the challenge; Nadia blamed Kaegan's disorganized, sloppy, klutzy, and slobby miscommunication for the Blue Team's defeat. Pressure Test 1: Returning to the MasterChef kitchen the next morning to face the first pressure test, the judges gave Michael V., the losing team captain, the choice to save the most deserving member of his Blue team, including himself. Following a lengthy deliberation and contemplation, he reluctantly decided to save himself. Michael G., Nadia, Kaegan, and Reem faced the pressure test, in which they had 80 minutes to replicate a four-layered Black Forest cake with two layers of mousseline pastry cream and a layer of chocolate ganache in the middle. Nadia and Michael G. made the two best cakes, with Nadia's cake deemed be the best; both safely advanced forward in the competition. Reem initially struggled with stress and produced a cake that was underbaked. Kaegan forgot to incorporate sugar in his cake batter and ended up serving a one-layer cake after he clumsily dropped one layer on the floor and the two remaining layers became soggy and disintegrated after they were soaked in sugar syrup. As a result, Kaegan was eliminated.
61	4	"Fast and Epicure-ious"	April 24, 2018	504	1166	13
Mystery Box 2: The home cooks found a large delivery cardboard box from Chefs Plate, Canada's #1 meal kit service, which contained a large variety of ingredients, including sauce, maple syrup, fruits, dairy products, meats, fish and vegetables. The cooks were tasked with designing a home-inspired dish that could be made in just 30 minutes, with the winner of the mystery box receiving three big advantages. Michael V., Nadia, and Michael G. made the three best dishes, and Michael G. won. Elimination Test 2: As the winner of the Mystery Box, Michael G. was safe from elimination and his dish was promotionally featured on the Chef's Plate menu across Canada. He was then given the advantage of assigning three different versions of a secret ingredient: dried, canned and fresh, to the remaining home cooks. Targeting Eugene and Andy, he gave the dried ingredient to Marissa, Jonathan and Beccy, the canned ingredient to Eugene, Andy and Reem, and the fresh ingredient to Nadia, Michael V. and Jen. The secret ingredient was revealed to be mushrooms in the pantry. Eugene made the best dish of the night, while Andy and Marissa made the second and third best dishes respectively. The trio became team captains for their next team challenge. Reem, Jonathan, and Nadia were singled out for having made the three worst dishes. Jonathan was saved first and Reem was eliminated.
62	5	"Barker's Dozen"	May 1, 2018	505	1.023	27
Team Challenge 2: The home cooks' second team challenge took place along Toronto's lakeside off leash dog park at the dog-friendly Cherry Beach. They were given two hours to make donuts for dog owners who frequented the park, and the team with the most sales won the challenge. Eugene chose Michael V. and Nadia, forming Red team, Andy chose Michael G. and Jen forming the Blue team, and Marissa chose Beccy and Jonathan forming the Green team. The Green team won the challenge. Pressure Test 2: The two losing teams faced the pressure test, but not all six home cooks participated. The Green team was given the advantage of decide which home cooks would be saved. After a brief discussion, they decided to save Andy from the Blue team and Nadia from the Red team. This left Michael G., Eugene, Jen and Michael V. to face the pressure test, in which they had to replicate a Russian salmon coulibiac. Jen made the best dish and was the first to be sent to safety. Despite his best efforts, Michael G.'s coulibiac had large, wide gaps between his slightly undercooked puff pastry crust and his slightly overcooked salmon, but did satisfactory enough to be barely saved next, leaving Eugene and Michael V. on the bottom two to face elimination, since they both forgot to season their salmon as they were layering, and their pastry crusts were very thick and hard. The judges felt that Michael V.'s coulibiac, which contained a whole leaf of parsley, was more appalling than Eugene's, and the former was eliminated as a result. MasterChef Canada Redemption - Part 1 of 3: Made available online shortly after this episode was broadcast, two of the first four eliminated home cooks, Kaegan and Michael V., were featured. They were both tasked with making a dish featuring trout. Kaegan was criticized for adding too much black pepper, while Michael V. was criticized for overcooking his trout. Ultimately, Kaegan was declared the winner and proceeded to the final round of Redemption.
63	6	"Vive La Pressure Test"	May 8, 2018	506	1.175	20
Gauntlet Pressure Test 1: Like the seventh episode of the previous season, the top 8 home cooks faced a series of three consecutive, grueling and daunting pressure test rounds, each featuring a French classic and getting progressively more difficult than the previous, revealing the home cooks' skills, strengths, and weaknesses, and one home cook was sent home at the end. The home cooks had to battle for survival to progress to the next stage of the competition. The first pressure test required them to make a classic French omelets by frying stiffly beaten egg whites and butter on a pan in just four minutes. While Jen's, Nadia's, Jonathan, and Marissa's omelets were complete messes, Eugene's and Beccy's omelettes were the best with Eugene's omelette deemed picture perfect, and both advanced safely into the Top 7. They also became team captains in their next team challenge. Additionally, Andy and Michael G. have also made intact omelettes perfectly cooked and decent enough to safely advance to the Top 7. Gauntlet Pressure Test 2: Jen, Jonathan, Marissa and Nadia faced the second pressure test, in which they had to make a butter-basted steak cooked medium rare, with just 15 minutes (2 minutes to heat up the pan, 8 minutes to sear the steak and baste it with butter, and 5 minutes to rest it). Nadia and Jen emerged as the winners and were saved. Gauntlet Pressure Test 3: Marissa and Jonathan went head-to-head for survival in the final pressure test, in which they had 30 minutes to make a stunning crème caramel finished with a caramel sugar dome. Marissa made the best dish and was saved, while Jonathan proceeds methodically but fell dangerously behind, leaving everything under the wire, compounded when he oiled the inside of his ramekin and filled it with sugar syrup instead of the outside, which made it difficult for him to remove the sugar syrup dome, losing valuable time. Finally, he made a grave, costly mistake when he flipped his pudding out from the ramekin, causing his pudding to disintegrate into a messy sauce, resulting in his elimination to the shock of the other home cooks. MasterChef Canada Redemption - Part 2 of 3: Made available online shortly after this episode was broadcast, Kaegan and Jonathan faced off in the final round of Redemption. They were both tasked with making a dish based on choices, the first of these being made by Jonathan for ranking higher than Kaegan. First, Jonathan selected the duck breasts, leaving Kaegan with the wild boar chops. Kaegan then selected the red potatoes, leaving Jonathan with the sweet potatoes. Jonathan then selected the broccolini, leaving Kaegan with the Brussels sprouts. Finally, Kaegan selected the Granny Smith apples, leaving Jonathan with the sweet oranges. The two home cooks began cooking with their ingredients. Ten minutes into the challenge, Claudio revealed that he was looking for someone who was inventive, resourceful, and flexible. Therefore, as a twist the two cooks were asked to switch places in the middle of the cook. MasterChef Canada Redemption - Part 3 of 3: Also made available online shortly after this episode was broadcast, Kaegan and Jonathan continued their face-off from MasterChef Canada Redemption - Part 2 of 3. In the end, Kaegan was praised for cooking another duck breast as an insurance policy (though he ultimately chose to plate Jonathan's original duck breast), but was criticized for having a little blood on the plate from the protein. Meanwhile, Jonathan was praised for having a flawless dish, but was criticized for forgetting to plate the potato chips that he had made out of Kaegan's red potatoes. Claudio then announced to the two that the winner would be revealed in the seventh episode, with such episode consisting of a team challenge followed by a pressure test.
64	7	"The Magnificent Seven"	May 15, 2018	507	1.162	17
Team Challenge 3: The Top 7 home cooks gathered for a Team Challenge in Kleinburg, Ont., at the McMichael Canadian Art Collection, home to the iconic Group of Seven. They were tasked with creating a three-course tasting menu inspired by the G7 art themes (land, sea and sky) for seven esteemed recipients of the Order of Canada. Eugene chose Andy and Michael G., forming the Red team, while Beccy chose Marissa and Jen, forming the Blue team. Nadia originally wanted to join the Blue team, but was ordered to join the Red team by Claudio, who then announced the winner of the MasterChef Canada: Redemption challenge. To the home cooks' surprise, Kaegan returned as the last member of the Blue team after emerging as the MasterChef Canada: Redemption winner after beating Michael V. and Jonathan. In the end, the Red Team was declared the winner for their creative menu. As their advantage, all four members of the Red Team (Andy, Michael G., Eugene and Nadia) safely advanced to the Top 7 once again, this time safe from the pressure test. Pressure Test 3: The Blue team faced the pressure test, in which they had to replicate oysters prepared three different ways. The first was a Japanese-inspired sake poached oyster with Asian pear slaw and a perfectly poached lobster claw. The second was a raw oyster topped with mignonette sauce, champagne jelly, and red tobiko, and the third was an oyster Rockefeller with béchamel spinach purée, sautéed oyster mushrooms with panko breadcrumbs. In a twist, the judges announced that the pressure test began with an impromptu oyster shucking challenge, in which the home cook who shucked the most oysters in 3 minutes would be saved. Taking quality into account, Marissa was saved, leaving Beccy, Kaegan and Jen to face the pressure test. Beccy produced the best dish, leaving Kaegan and Jen as the bottom two. The judges decided to save Kaegan, resulting in Jen being sent home.
65	8	"Cooking with (Corner) Gas"	May 22, 2018	508	1.187	7
Mystery Box 3: The voice cast of Corner Gas Animated (Brent Butt, Tara Spencer-Nairn, Lorne Cardinal and Nancy Robertson) made a surprise appearance during the mystery box challenge to inspire the home cooks with some comic relief. The theme of the challenge was elevated diner food. Nadia, Beccy, and Andy made the three best dishes, and Andy won. Elimination Test 3: The remaining home cooks faced the classic MasterChef tag team challenge. They were tasked with recreating an East Asian street food platter, consisting of steamed bao with pork belly, jellyfish salad, banh mi sandwich with chili chicken and chicken liver mousse, takoyaki, and banana fritters. Targeting Eugene and Michael G., Andy paired Eugene with Beccy and Michael with Kaegan, leaving Marissa with Nadia. Despite Michael G.’s initial concerns on working with Kaegan, the two made the best platter, which was well-received by the judges for its flavours, although their banana fritters were burnt and their takoyaki balls were slightly overcooked. Despite Beccy loudly yelling at Eugene throughout the challenge, and in spite of missing a few components, the strong flavours of Beccy and Eugene's platter saved them both from elimination. Nadia and Marissa's platter was heavily criticized by the judges as they presented no banana fritters, an incomplete bao, a sloppy jellyfish salad, a bland and incomplete banh mi sandwich, and raw takoyaki, in addition to Marissa refusing to communicate throughout the challenge, resulting in poor quality of work. The judges deemed Nadia to have performed better than Marissa, who was sent home.
66	9	"On the Line of Fire"	May 29, 2018	509	1.085	7
Team Challenge 4: The Top 6 home cooks faced a fiery, super-charged Restaurant Takeover team challenge at Claudio's Toronto restaurant, Copetin. The teams had to prepare and serve two technically demanding appetizers: octopus a la planche and beef tartare, and two sophisticated entrées: sea bream and lamb, to a room filled with discerning VIP diner guests. As the winners of the last challenge, Michael G. and Kaegan were team captains; Michael G. chose Andy and Nadia, forming the Red Team, while Kaegan chose Eugene and was left with Beccy, rounding out the Blue Team. While the Red Team performed smoothly and sailed through dinner service, efficiently pumping out dishes due to Michael G. evenly distributing the tasks and decisive leadership, the Blue Team fell dangerously behind as Kaegan was overcome with stress, holding the Blue Team back and stagnating the flow of dishes. He eventually relinquished his captaincy to Beccy, allowing the Blue Team to catch up. The Red Team was declared the winner. Pressure Test 4: Kaegan, Eugene and Beccy had 75 minutes to make 10 macarons with two distinct flavours. Leaving everything down to the wire, all three of them struggled with neatly packaging their 10 macarons, which looked unappetizingly disfigured. The judges praised Beccy for having made the best macarons, which exhibited skills just good enough for her to be saved first. Both Eugene and Kaegan were left as the bottom two, as they both had significant issues in their macarons. The judges decided that Kaegan made the weakest macarons and he was sent home once again, this time for good.
67	10	"Guess Who's Coming to Dinner?"	June 5, 2018	510	1.260	5
Mystery Box 4: As the competition tightened, the Top 5 quarterfinalists were presented with coolers containing the exact same ingredients they used to make their audition dishes and for the final mystery box challenge of the season, they were required to rework their signature ingredient from their audition to make a new dish that used those ingredients in a different way to showcase how much they grew during the competition. Furthermore, the judges surprised the five quarterfinalists by bringing in their family members, who dropped by for a surprise guest visit, and they also worked alongside them. The winner of the last mystery box challenge received a big advantage in the last elimination challenge of the season and not one but two quarterfinalists will be eliminated in order to determine the final top three semifinalists. Andy, Beccy and Michael G. made the top three best dishes, and Beccy won. Elimination Test 4: Beccy did not automatically advance to the Top 3 semifinals, and had to participate in the elimination challenge, which featured the four previous season winners: Eric Chong (season 1), David Jorge (season 2), Mary Berg (season 3) and Trevor Connie (season 4). The four chefs guest starred in the challenge and each came with a basket full of ingredients to inspire the home cooks. Beccy's advantage allowed her to assign the baskets to the other home cooks, including herself. She chose Mary's baking basket and also gave the same basket to Andy. She then gave Eric's East Asian basket to Michael G., David's seafood basket to Nadia, and Trevor's Italian basket to Eugene. Following the cook, Michael G. and Andy impressed the judges with their Thai green curry and sweet and savoury cream cheese tart, respectively, and they earned the first two spots in the semifinals. Nadia and Eugene's unseasoned, bland and stale dishes received lukewarm reviews, while Beccy was also taken to task. Despite being complimented for her presentation and for the pears which were cooked with buttermilk, overall her dish was disliked due to clashing flavours, a bitter aftertaste and lack of sweetness. Ultimately, the judges decided to save Beccy, who did just enough to earn the last spot in the Top 3 semifinals, sending both Eugene and Nadia home in a double elimination.
68	11	"Pop-Up Star"	June 12, 2018	511	1.193	5
Individual challenge: In the penultimate semi-finals, the final 3 remaining semifinalists faced their ever first pop-up restaurant challenge, cooking individually indoors for 30 of Canada's top food influencers, bloggers, food critics and foodies, who were the VIP diner guests. They were tasked with making 11 plates of an entrée in 90 minutes that reflected one of three different pop-up restaurant styles with unique cuisines that were set up for each of them, and the winner of the penultimate individual immunity cook-off challenge directly advanced to the finale while the other two remaining semifinalists would battle it out in one last Pressure Test. While each semifinalist's entrée had ups and downs, the judges decided that Beccy, whose elegantly plated dish was perfectly cooked (albeit a tad under-seasoned) edged out Michael G. (whose lamb rack was inconsistently cooked and was missing the pea puree and Andy (whose overambitious caramelized kimchi was a misstep that threw the dish off-balance), and she earned the first spot in the finale. Pressure Test 5: Both Michael G. and Andy went head-to-head in the final replication Pressure Test of the season. They had 75 minutes to replicate elevated versions of three classic, iconic Canadian desserts consisting of a deconstructed Nanaimo bar featuring a flourless brownie base topped with a coconut milk jelly cube, a rum-soaked maple syrup butter tart topped with torched ginger meringue, garnished with bruleed figs, and an updated blueberry grunt featuring cornbread cake on a bed of blueberry compote, and topped with whipped cream. After sampling all three desserts, the judges felt that Michael G.'s underbaked tart (which caused the runny filling to ooze out) and the stale, plain corn cake in his bland Blueberry grunt were missteps too difficult to ignore, resulting in Michael G.'s third place elimination from the competition. As a result, Andy (whose desserts tasted better than they looked) joined Beccy in the finale.
69	12	"Three Courses, One Crown"	June 19, 2018	512	1.345	3
In the Season 5 finale, Beccy and Andy competed for the title. As with the previous season, they had to constantly work non-stop for three whole hours to prepare a three-course meal for the judges, spending one hour on each course. Their appetizer had to be ready for pick-up after the first hour, the entrée after 2 hours, and dessert after 3 hours, after which they would be judged in private. For the appetizers, Beccy served a quail Scotch egg on a nest of spiralled potatoes and parsnips, while Andy served a Halifax lamb donair salad with Pita chips and Tahini dressing. For the entrees, Beccy delivered rabbit two ways with Jerusalem artichoke puree, while Andy made an elevated hodge-podge with Dungeness crab, sweetbreads, onion soubise and crab bisque. Finally, for the desserts, Beccy served a "Fallen apple" panna cotta with an apple gelee core on a soil of dried fruits and pine nuts, while Andy served a Newfoundland touton with malted pastry cream, brown sugar and bruleed rhubarb. The judges decided that Beccy's overall menu was slightly better executed and more innovative, and she was named the youngest winner of MasterChef Canada.
