= Andy Hay (chef) =

Canadian chef and television personality

Andy Hay is a Canadian chef and television personality from Dartmouth, Nova Scotia, who launched the Food Network Canada television series Andy's East Coast Kitchen Crawl in 2026.

After having intended to launch a career in technology sales, he became interested in cooking while on a trip with his fiancée to Southeast Asia in his early 20s, and taught himself to cook over the next number of years.

He first became known as a competitor in the fifth season of MasterChef Canada in 2018, finishing the season as the runner-up behind Beccy Stables. He returned to the show in 2021 for the "Back to Win" season 7, finishing as joint runner-up with Thea VanHerwaarden behind winner Christopher Siu.

Previously the owner of a catering company in Dartmouth, he was forced to shut down due to the loss of business during the COVID-19 pandemic in Canada. He then leaned much more strongly into creating food content for social networking platforms, becoming known for his Andy's East Coast Kitchen channel on Instagram.

In 2026 he launched the Food Network series, a travelogue show in which he travels throughout Atlantic Canada, visiting restaurants, homes and other food venues to highlight and celebrate the region's diverse and unique food culture. In promoting the show, he told the press that his goal had always been to become "a poor man's Anthony Bourdain", combining his passions for food and travel by creating shows that celebrated different local and regional cuisines.

He has also published the cookbook Let's Eat In: Favorite Family Dishes That Are More Delicious at Home.
