= MasterChef Canada season 6 =

Season of television series

MasterChef Canada
- Season 6
- No. of episodes: 12

Release
- Original network: CTV
- Original release: April 8 – June 10, 2019

Season chronology
- ← Previous; Season 5 Next → Season 7

The sixth season of MasterChef Canada aired its special 2-hour season premiere on April 8, 2019 on CTV, concluding on June 10, 2019 with Jennifer Crawford of Kingston, Nova Scotia crowned as the winner and Andre Bhagwandat of Scarborough, Ontario finishing as the runner-up. He subsequently returned to compete again on MasterChef Canada: Back to Win, where he placed 7th. Crawford became the first non-binary person and the first person from the Maritimes to win the competition.

CTV announced the renewal in August 2018 and casting call tryouts were held that fall. Filming began in early December of 2018 and wrapped up in mid-February 2019. In a new unique twist this season (which did not feature the iconic annual tag-team challenge that was featured in the previous five seasons), each judge selected six home cooks to invite to the Top 18, with each member receiving personal invitations delivered via courier. This is the penultimate season narrated by Charlie Ryan and featuring Aprile, Leung and Bonacini as judges.

== Top 12 ==
Except where noted, source for all names, hometowns, and occupations:

Contestant	Age	Hometown	Occupation	Invited by	Status
Jennifer Crawford	37	Kingston, Nova Scotia	Senior policy analyst	Claudio	Winner June 10
Andre Bhagwandat	28	Scarborough, Ontario	Hospital housekeeper	Claudio	Runner-Up June 10
Josh Miller	34	Regina, Saskatchewan	Youth care home manager	Alvin	Eliminated June 3
Cryssi Larocque	38	Thunder Bay, Ontario	Former airline agent	Claudio	Eliminated May 27
Chanelle Saks	28	Calgary, Alberta	Entrepreneur	Michael	Eliminated May 27
Rozin Abbas	30	Toronto, Ontario	Digital marketer	Claudio	Eliminated May 20; Returned May 13; Eliminated April 29
Jennifer "Jenny" Miller	32	Havre Boucher, Nova Scotia	Stay-at-home mom	Michael	Eliminated May 6
Alyssa LeBlanc	28	Tusket, Nova Scotia	Former public servant	Alvin	Eliminated May 6
Tony La Ferrara	69-70	Whitby, Ontario	Retired teacher	Michael	Eliminated April 22
Colin Buckingham	30	St. John's, Newfoundland and Labrador	Car salesman	Michael	Eliminated April 15
Cliff McArthur	39	Scarborough, Ontario	IT support analyst	Alvin	Eliminated April 8
Steven Lapointe	21	Acton Vale, Quebec	International figure skater	Michael	Eliminated April 8

== Elimination table ==
Place	Contestant	Episode															
Place	Contestant	2		3	4		5	6		7	8	9		10	11		12
1	Jennifer	HIGH	IMM	PT	HIGH	WIN	WIN	IN	WIN	IMM	NPT	IN	IN	WIN	IN	WIN	WINNER
2	Andre	IN	IN	WIN	IN	WIN	PT	IN	IN	IMM	NPT	WIN	WIN	WIN	WIN	LOW	RUNNER-UP
3	Josh	IN	IN	NPT	WIN	IMM	WIN	HIGH	HIGH	IMM	LOW	IN	LOW	PT	IN	ELIM	
4	Cryssi	HIGH	IMM	WIN	IN	IMM	PT	WIN	IN	IMM	PT	IN	HIGH	ELIM			
5	Chanelle	IN	WIN	LOW	IN	IN	WIN	HIGH	HIGH	IMM	LOW	IN	ELIM				
6	Rozin	IN	IN	LOW	HIGH	IN	ELIM			RET	ELIM						
7	Jenny	WIN	IMM	WIN	IN	LOW	LOW	IN	ELIM								
7	Alyssa	IN	LOW	WIN	IN	IMM	WIN	IN	ELIM								
9	Tony	IN	WIN	WIN	IN	ELIM											
10	Colin	IN	LOW	ELIM													
11	Cliff	IN	ELIM														
11	Steven	IN	ELIM														

(WINNER) This cook won the competition.
(RUNNER-UP) This cook finished in second place.
(WIN) The cook won the individual challenge (Mystery Box Challenge or Elimination Test).
(WIN) The cook was on the winning team in the Team Challenge and was directly advanced to the next round.
(HIGH) The cook was one of the top entries in the Mystery Box Challenge, but did not win, or received considerable praise during an Elimination Test.
(PT) The cook was on the losing team in the Team Challenge or did not win the individual challenge, but won the Pressure Test.
(IN) The cook was not selected as a top entry or bottom entry in an individual challenge.
(IN) The cook was not selected as a top entry or bottom entry in a team challenge.
(IMM) The cook did not have to compete in that round of the competition and was safe from elimination.
(IMM) The cook was selected by Mystery Box Challenge winner and did not have to compete in the Elimination Test.
(PT) The cook was on the losing team in the Team Challenge, competed in the Pressure Test, and advanced.
(NPT) The cook was on the losing team in the Team Challenge, but was exempted from the Pressure Test
(RET) The cook was eliminated but came back to compete to return to the competition.
(LOW) The cook was one of the bottom entries in an individual elimination challenge or pressure test and advanced.
(LOW) The cook was one of the bottom entries in the Team Challenge, and advanced.
(WDR) The cook withdrew from the competition due to illness or personal reasons.
(ELIM) The cook was eliminated from MasterChef.

== Episodes ==
No. overall	No. in season	Title	Original release date	Prod. code	CAN viewers (millions)	Rank (week)
70	1	"Masterchef Canada Invitational"	April 8, 2019	601	1.128	16
Season 6 kicks off with eighteen applicants, six chosen by Alvin Leung, Claudio Aprile and Michael Bonacini each, personally invited to compete in an inaugural 1 hour cook-off qualifying round for a coveted MasterChef Canada white apron in three separate cook-off challenge qualifying rounds. This season, the judges sifted through a pile of resume photos to handpick the Top 18 hopeful applicants to do battle. The 18 applicants, divided in 3 groups of six (chosen by Michael, Claudio or Alvin) will have to compete against each other to win the white aprons and each group of six took turns cooking for the judge who signed their invitation. Each judge coaches their respective group of applicant invitees by checking in with the applicants throughout the cook-off. Of Alvin’s group, assigned chicken, Cliff's dish is deemed the best and he is awarded the first apron; Alyssa and Josh are also awarded white aprons while Kimberly, Jamie and Laurie are sent home. Of Michael's group, assigned beef, Marie is sent home while Chanelle, Colin, Jenny, Steven and Tony are all awarded aprons, with Tony's dish praised as the best of the group. Of Claudio’s group, assigned shrimp, Andre, Jennifer and Rozin are given aprons after cooking the best dishes; Cryssi is given the last apron, rounding out the Top 12 while Lena and Mark are eliminated.
71	2	"Home Cooks, Your Roots Are Showing"	April 8, 2019	602	1.200	10
Mystery Box 1: The very first Mystery Box challenge featured an array of root vegetables for the contestants to create either a sweet or savoury dish of their own choice. The judges decided that the three best dishes belonged to Jennifer, Cryssi and Jenny, and Jenny won. Elimination Test 1: As the winner of the Mystery Box, Jenny was safe from elimination and was allowed to save two other home cooks. She chose to save Cryssi and Jennifer. The other home cooks were tasked with cooking a dish using different proteins, with two cooks being sent home at the end. Jenny had the advantage of selecting the order in which they chose the proteins. Targeting Rozin, she left him to have the last pick; the cooks chose proteins in the following order: Tony picked Alaskan king crab, Colin chose salmon, Josh selected clams, Cliff picked duck legs, Andre chose pork shoulder, Steven selected ground beef, Chanelle selected octopus, and Alyssa chose turkey, leaving Rozin with leg of lamb. Tony and Chanelle, who both took risks by choosing a protein they rarely (or in Chanelle's case, never) cooked with, produced the best dishes and were named captains for their first team challenge. The worst four dishes were made by Colin, Steven, Alyssa, and Cliff. The judges were disappointed with both Colin and Alyssa's subpar dishes, but saved them for their perfectly cooked proteins. Both Cliff and Steven were the first two contestants to be sent home in a double-elimination as a result.
72	3	"Top Hats and Tails"	April 15, 2019	603	0.917	25
Team Challenge 1: For their very first team challenge, the Top 10 home cooks split up into two even teams of five. They were tasked with cooking Caribbean dishes, catering for 121 wedding guests. With the best dish from the last challenge, Tony was given the choice of picking the proteins or team members. He chose to pick team members, selecting Andre, Jenny, Alyssa and Cryssi for his Red team, while Chanelle selected Jennifer, Rozin, Colin and was left with Josh for her Blue team. For the three-hour catering, the Blue team cooked crab and shrimp for their appetizer and chicken for their entree, while the Red team prepared a red snapper appetizer and a beef tenderloin entree. Although the judges had to step in towards the end of the cook-off to assist both teams pumping out dishes, the Red Team narrowly edged out the Blue Team by a slim margin of 3 votes. Pressure Test 1: Before the first pressure test began, the judges gave all five members of the losing Blue team the opportunity to choose one home cook to exempt from the pressure test. Because of his outstanding performance preparing the chicken entree, the team chose to save Josh. This left Chanelle, Rozin, Jennifer and Colin baking a sweet and a savoury cheesecake in 80 minutes. Jennifer’s ‘Everything Bagel’ and ‘A Walk in the Forest’ cheesecakes were deemed the best, sending her to safety first. Rozin was criticized for over-ambitiously overreaching in his concepts for both his savoury Stilton and sweet tahini-themed cheesecakes, which were sloppily messy with superfluous garnishes and under-baked, but he was deemed to have done just enough to be saved next, leaving Chanelle and Colin as the bottom two. Colin’s savoury scallop ceviche cheesecake was lambasted by the judges, but his strawberry cheesecake was liked, though underbaked. Chanelle’s savoury goat cheese cheesecake was well-received, but her matcha cheesecake had cracked and was raw in the center. The judges chose to save Chanelle, eliminating Colin.
73	4	"Tastes Like Teen Spirit"	April 22, 2019	604	0.931	27
Mystery Box 2: The Top 9 home cooks discovered their teenage photos from their childhood underneath their mystery boxes. As Season 5 winner Beccy Stables visited the MasterChef Canada kitchen, the home cooks were tasked to elevate their favorite dish from their teenage years. The best three dishes belonged to Jennifer, Rozin and Josh, and Josh won. Elimination Test 2: As the winner of Mystery Box, Josh was safe from elimination. The theme of the elimination challenge was spices. The other home cooks were shown nine boxes containing three different spices, all of which they had to showcase in their dish. However, two of the nine boxes granted the home cook immunity. The remaining home cooks were asked to randomly pick a box in random to find out what were inside. Alyssa and Cryssi picked the "Safe" boxes and were safe from elimination. This left Jenny with celery seed, cayenne pepper and fennel seed, Andre with caraway seed, cumin and savory, Rozin with rosemary leaves, lavender and white pepper, Chanelle with Chinese ginger, sage and turmeric, Jennifer with cloves, cinnamon and thyme, and Tony with cardamom, nutmeg and coriander seed. The two best dishes of the belonged to Jennifer and Andre, who became team captains for the next field team challenge. Rozin was chastised by Claudio for putting flour in his protein, but the worst two dishes belonged to Jenny and Tony. Jenny was frazzled and confused in the challenge, but the judges were disappointed that Tony had not shown diverse multifaceted range or well-rounded versatility by making yet another Italian pasta dish, sending him home as a result.
74	5	"School Lunch!"	April 29, 2019	605	0.978	25
Team Challenge 2: The Top 8 was tasked to prepare school lunches for 161 school kids for one of the biggest team challenges ever. With the best dishes from the last elimination challenge, Jennifer and Andre were appointed team captains for this challenge. Jennifer as the Red team captain chose Josh, Alyssa and Chanelle, while Andre, as the blue team captain, chose Jenny, Rozin and was left with Cryssi. The Red team won the challenge with 99 to 62 votes. Pressure Test 2: Andre, Rozin, Jenny and Cryssi had only 20 minutes to replicate a plate of Valencian Fideuà, consisting of squid, shrimp, noodles, mussels, clams and saffron in a fight for survival in the competition, making this the fastest & shortest replication pressure test in MasterChef Canada's 6 season history. Andre and Cryssi both exceptionally nailed their dishes, with Andre's declared the cream of the crop, as he was sent to safety first. Jenny and Rozin’s dishes though both had multiple issues. Despite flawlessly cooking his noodles to perfection, Rozin served an incomplete dish that was missing multiple components, as he forgot what the dish looked like, and his raw, rock-hard squid tentacles were inedible. Jenny cut herself, and despite continuing with one hand, messed up her first batch of noodles during the cook by pouring the chicken stock in too early. Her bland dish was unseasoned and had noodles that were inconsistently cooked and soggy. Ultimately, the judges felt that Rozin’s half-complete dish was the most appalling and eliminated him.
75	6	"Risk and Reward"	May 6, 2019	606	0.888	30>
Mystery Box 3: The home cooks learned whether taking a risk was worth the reward in this mystery box. There were two boxes: one clear glass box containing potato, squash, pork chop and maple syrup, and an opaque black box containing unknown ingredients. The home cooks who chose the opaque box had a full hour to cook, but those who chose the clear box had to wait for the clock to tick down to 45 minutes. Andre and Josh chose the safe box. Alyssa, Jennifer, Cryssi, Jenny and Chanelle chose to take a risk with the secret box, which contained largely exotic ingredients including black cod, escarole, passion fruit and tamarind paste. In the end, the best dishes belonged to Chanelle, Josh and Cryssi, and Cryssi won. Elimination Test 3: The theme of the elimination challenge was opulent and luxuriously extravagant East Asian ingredients unveiled by Alvin in the pantry. Cryssi was not safe from elimination, but she had the advantage of assigning the ingredients to each home cook. She chose Wagyu beef for herself. Targeting Chanelle, Andre and Jennifer, she assigned uni to Andre, abalone to Chanelle, ebisu dai to Jennifer, black garlic to Josh, Matsutake mushrooms to Jenny, and XO sauce to Alyssa. Jennifer made the best dish while Josh and Chanelle were also praised for their exceptional, knockout dishes, with Cryssi receiving lukewarm mixed reviews. Andre was harshly lambasted by Alvin for having very little sea urchin in his dish and not doing much to highlight, honour and feature it as the star of the dish, which he was supposed to. The judges ultimately deemed Jenny and Alyssa's dishes the worst two. As a result, both of them were eliminated. However, the episode ended on a cliffhanger, as the judges announced that their time in the MasterChef kitchen was not quite over.
76	7	"Knife Fight!"	May 13, 2019	607	1.018	20
Jenny, Alyssa, Rozin and Tony were brought back into the MasterChef Canada kitchen and subjected to a series of three consecutive gruelling redemption challenges involving knife skills. At the end of each round, one of the four would be eliminated, and the last cook standing would rejoin the competition. Redemption Challenge Part 1: The four home cooks' skills in using a chef's knife were tested by having to julienne cut red onions, sweet peppers, zucchinis, carrots, and mangos to make an Asian rice noodle salad with Thai chilli vinaigrette in 14 minutes. Jenny and Tony made near perfect dishes. Rozin's noodles stuck together but were presented nicely. Due to poor time management, Alyssa presented a salad that was missing various components, resulting in her permanent elimination. Redemption Challenge Part 2: The remaining three home cooks had to filet a Dover sole and use two of the fillets to make Sole meunière in just 8 minutes. All three cooks had issues with their fish - Tony's fillets were slightly underdone, Rozin's fillets were too light from his butter not being hot enough, and Jenny's fillets were uneven in size from leaving too much meat on the carcass, causing one to be overcooked. Jenny was eliminated in this round. Redemption Challenge Part 3: Rozin and Tony battled head-to-head in French trimming a rack of lamb and cooking it to a perfect medium rare in only 22 minutes. While both home cooks' dishes were nearly even in taste, Rozin's lamb was flawlessly medium rare, while Tony's lamb was slightly overcooked and sinewy on the bone. Rozin emerged as the winner and rejoined the competition.
77	8	"Into the Fire"	May 20, 2019	608	0.964	15
Team Challenge 3: The Top 6 home cooks cooked in the annual MasterChef Restaurant Takeover team challenge in Michael Bonacini's Leña Restaurante. Josh and Cryssi were chosen as the team captains by the judges as they had never led a team challenge. Josh, as the Red Team captain, chose Jennifer and Chanelle, and Cryssi, as the Blue Team captain, chose Rozin and was left with Andre. They had to prepare two appetizers: a broken avocado salad and clam dish with chorizo, and two entrees: an Atlantic salmon dish and a roasted lamb sirloin dish. While both teams smoothly sailed in the appetizer round, they both struggled equally when communication went down in the entree round, which included a raw salmon getting out to the dining room. This resulted in Michael Bonacini and Julie, his right-hand sous chef de cuisine assistant both having to help out. Returning to the studio the next morning, the judges declared both teams the losers, as they felt that neither team performed well enough to be awarded immunity from the pressure test - a first in the Canadian version's history. Pressure Test 3: Both teams of three faced the pressure test, but not all six cooks participated. The judges gave Josh and Cryssi the opportunity to save only one of their two fellow teammates, but they were not allowed to save themselves as the judges felt they were both fully responsible for the lack of communication throughout the team challenge. Josh saved Jennifer while Cryssi saved Andre. The theme of this replication Pressure Test was breakfast, and Josh, Cryssi, Chanelle and Rozin had 65 minutes to replicate the three judges' favorite breakfast dishes: Full English with English muffins for Michael, congee for Alvin, and bizcocho for Claudio. Cryssi produced the best breakfast trio, with Claudio stating that all three of her dishes would make the judges "jump out of bed", while Josh, Chanelle and Rozin were the bottom three. Josh produced a well executed Full English, but his bizcochos despite gaining compliments were slightly dry, and his congee was bland and had the wrong consistency. Chanelle's congee was near perfect, but some of the components in her Full English had technical flaws, and her small and breadstick-like bizcochos were a complete disaster. Rozin fared much worse than both of them with fundamental flaws in all three dishes; the blood sausage in his full English breakfast exploded, his small bizcochos were both overcooked and dry, and his congee had a very overpowering, bitter aftertaste due to imbalanced use of spices. As a result, Rozin was eliminated once again, this time for good.
78	9	"Wheel of Fruit"	May 27, 2019	609	1.069	9
Mystery Box 4: The Top 5 home cooks were faced with a giant mystery box where their loved ones were waiting inside: Jennifer's boyfriend, Cryssi's sister, Chanelle's husband, Josh's wife, and Andre's aunt. In the first cook-off challenge round, the home cooks' loved ones not only cooked alongside them, but in fact did most of the cooking in the hour. The home cooks were tasked with coaching them from the sidelines and were only given 18 minutes to help them throughout the cook-off. They were tasked with making a fried chicken dish with biscuits, gravy and coleslaw. After tasting all five of the dishes, the judges decided that Andre and his aunt were the winners of the Mystery Box, earning him an advantage in the next elimination challenge. Elimination Test 4: The theme of the penultimate elimination challenge was tropical fruits. The Top 5 randomly spun a wheel to randomly determine the type of exotic tropical fruit they had to cook with and the type of dish they had to make (savoury or sweet). As his advantage, Andre did not need to spin the wheel and was allowed to choose any of the fruits and the kind of dish he made. He chose to make a savory dish using passion fruit. The remaining four cooks randomly spun the wheel, resulting in Cryssi to making a sweet dish with sugar apple, Josh making a savoury dish with tamarind, Chanelle making a sweet dish using soursop, and Jennifer making a savoury dish with coconut. Andre produced the best dish, and Cryssi's sugar apple tart was also praised. Jennifer was criticized for overcooking their lobster, while Chanelle's dish was messy and the soursop was overpowered by other flavors. Josh was criticized for playing it far too safe, doing very little in the allotted timeframe, using a premade tortilla in his dish, which had messy plating and lack of ambition with his basic idea. Josh and Chanelle were singled out as the bottom two, and Chanelle was eliminated.
79	10	"Gifts from the Earth"	May 27, 2019	610	1.094	6
Team Challenge 4: The final four quarterfinalists arrived at the Canadian Canoe Museum in Peterborough, where they divided in pairs of 2 for the last off-site field team challenge cook-off to honour Indigenous agriculture for a shot at immunity. Each team had to create a three course menu consisting of three dishes that honor the Three Sisters ingredients: corn in the appetizer, beans in the entree, and squash in the dessert. With the best winning dish from the last challenge, Andre was given the advantage choosing his teammate. Andre selected Jennifer, leaving Cryssi with Josh as the other team of two by default. Andre and Jennifer won the last team challenge, automatically advancing to the penultimate Top 3 semifinals. Pressure Test 4: As the losing team, Cryssi and Josh faced each other in one final pressure test for the last spot in the semifinals. They were tasked with replicating a tempered chocolate sphere dessert consisting of a pistachio genoise cake and topped with bruléed figs, accompanied by a caramel sauce. Despite his initial nervousness in baking such a difficult dessert, Josh performed smoothly and produced a near perfect, well executed dessert, although his cake was slightly dry. Cryssi miscalculated the timing of filling her mould with her tempered chocolate, which quickly solidified, only covering three quarters of the interior. Cryssi then had to create another one using a balloon, resulting in a lumpy and dull chocolate egg-shaped sphere. Despite her tastier flavours, Josh ultimately advanced to the Top 3 semifinals and Cryssi was sent home in fourth place.
80	11	"Fire and Ice"	June 3, 2019	611	1.344	2
Mystery Box 5: The 3 remaining semifinalists were excited when the judges introduced Olympic ice dancer and gold medalist Tessa Virtue to the judging panel as the special guest star. Tessa explained the Fire & Ice theme of the last mystery box challenge of the season. Andre, Jennifer, and Josh were tasked with making a stunningly elevated, unique dish symbolizing spicy heat and cool snow using molecular gastronomy to elevate their plating to artistically inventive, groundbreaking heights. Andre produced the best dish and won the last Mystery Box challenge. Elimination Test 5: Andre did not directly advance to the finale and had still cook alongside his fellow two semi-finalists Jennifer and Josh in the last elimination challenge of the season, the theme of which was Canadian cheeses. The 3 semifinalists were tasked with creating a three-course tasting menu using an assigned cheese by whipping up three dishes featuring said cheese. With his advantage, Andre was allowed to choose the cheese he wanted to work with and assign the other two cheeses to Jennifer and Josh. Andre selected grey owl ash-ripened goat cheese for himself, and gave the Avonlea clothbound cheddar cheese to Jennifer and tiger blue cheese to Josh. Jennifer made the best dishes and earned the first spot in the finale. With more issues in their dishes, the judges decided that Andre's dishes slightly edged out Josh's with more finesse. Andre advanced to the finale, resulting in Josh being eliminated in third place.
81	12	"Final Showdown"	June 10, 2019	612	1.445	1
Jennifer and Andre faced off in a three-hour, three-course battle for the title of MasterChef Canada. As in the past two seasons, they had to work non-stop for three whole hours to prepare a three-course meal for the judges, spending one hour on each course, presenting the appetizer after the first hour, entree after the second, and dessert at the end of the third hour. For the appetizer, Andre served a Caribbean lobster run down with coconut-callaloo puree and boiled dumplings, while Jennifer served a fancy version of ants on a log with port-poached figs, celery brunoise, and blue cheese mousse. For the entree, Jennifer presented a braised lamb shank on hay-smoked oats with sour cherry glaze and a mint cotton candy "fleece" inspired by "Mary's Little Lamb", while Andre created a Caribbean-Korean fusion curried goat bo ssäm, with goat two ways, caramelized kimchi, mango salad, and gochujang sauce. For dessert, Andre served a deconstructed turon with Chinese five spice waffle, caramelized plantains, grapefruit soda snow, and Irish moss ice cream, while Jennifer served an elevated version of treat cereal with chocolate soil, puffed rice, sugar-cured egg yolk, marshmallow meringues, and tea-smoked milk. With both finalists demonstrating a strong sense of flavour, creativity and innovation in their dishes, the judges considered the overall story presented across the three courses and the finalists’ culinary journey throughout the competition. Ultimately, Jennifer was crowned the winner.
