= MasterChef Canada season 4 =

Season of television series

MasterChef Canada
- Season 4
- No. of episodes: 12

Release
- Original network: CTV
- Original release: March 2 – June 1, 2017

Season chronology
- ← Previous; Season 3 Next → Season 5

The fourth season of MasterChef Canada originally premiered on March 2, 2017 on CTV before concluding on June 1. In the United States, this season aired on The Cooking Channel on October 10, 2017. Trevor Connie was crowned the winner. Connie also guest starred in an episode of season five. This was the first season to change up the show's traditional, original audition format, instead directly facing the twenty-four applicants with a surprise challenge remotely in their hometowns and workplaces that would be finished in the MasterChef Canada kitchen, where only a dozen spots in the competition were available. This season also marks the first time that the finale required the finalists to constantly work non-stop for three whole hours to pump out their dishes, which became the norm in subsequent seasons.

Runner-up Dorothea "Thea" VanHerwaarden, fourth place quarterfinalist Mai Nguyen, and third place semifinalist Barrie McConachie, all returned to MasterChef Canada: Back to Win. Barrie placed 9th after initially placing 11th due to a contestant withdrawing from the season while Mai placed 5th. Thea was co-runner-up of the season.

== Top 12 ==
Contestant	Age	Hometown	Occupation	Status
Trevor Connie	26	Edmonton, Alberta	Plumber/gas fitter	Winner June 1
Dorothea "Thea" VanHerwaarden	29	Vancouver, British Columbia	Broker	Runner-Up June 1
Barrie McConachie	54	Vancouver, British Columbia	Employee relations consultant	Eliminated May 25
Mai Nguyen	28	Edmonton, Alberta	Health and safety advisor	Eliminated May 11
Miranda Wasstrom	29	Edmonton, Alberta	Corporate safety administrator	Eliminated May 4
Aaron Polsky	33	Montréal, Québec	Director of operations	Eliminated April 27
Alice Luo	28	Toronto, Ontario	PhD student	Eliminated April 13; Returned April 13; Eliminated March 9
Justine Joyal	23	Montréal, Québec	Business student	Eliminated April 6
Matt VanderHelm	28	Toronto, Ontario	Category manager	Eliminated April 6
Alisha Sood	27	Mississauga, Ontario	Make-up artist	Eliminated March 30
Jordan Levin	22	Winnipeg, Manitoba	Server	Eliminated March 23
Kimberly Duffus	24	Malton, Ontario	Sales rep	Eliminated March 16

== Elimination table ==
Place	Contestant	Episode																		
Place	Contestant	2		3	4		5	6		R	7			8	9		10	11		12
1	Trevor	WIN	IMM	WIN	HIGH	LOW	LOW	HIGH	WIN	IMM	LOW	WIN	IMM	WIN	HIGH	HIGH	WIN	IN	WIN	WINNER
2	Thea	IN	LOW	PT	HIGH	IMM	PT	WIN	IMM	IMM	IN	IMM	IMM	LOW	IN	LOW	PT	IN	LOW	RUNNER-UP
3	Barrie	IN	IMM	WIN	IN	IN	NPT	HIGH	WIN	IMM	WIN	IMM	IMM	WIN	HIGH	WIN	WIN	WIN	ELIM	
4	Mai	IN	LOW	LOW	IN	WIN	WIN	IN	IMM	IMM	LOW	IN	IMM	WIN	IN	IN	ELIM			
5	Miranda	HIGH	WIN	NPT	IN	IN	WIN	IN	IN	IMM	LOW	LOW	IN	PT	WIN	ELIM				
6	Aaron	HIGH	IMM	WIN	IN	WIN	NPT	IN	IN	IMM	HIGH	IMM	IMM	ELIM						
7	Alice	IN	ELIM							RET	LOW	LOW	ELIM							
8	Justine	IN	WIN	WIN	WIN	IMM	WIN	IN	ELIM											
8	Matt	IN	IMM	LOW	WIN	IMM	PT	IN	ELIM											
10	Alisha	IN	IN	WIN	IN	WIN	ELIM													
11	Jordan	IN	IMM	WIN	IN	ELIM														
12	Kimberly	IN	IN	ELIM																

(WINNER) This cook won the competition.
(RUNNER-UP) This cook finished in second place.
(WIN) The cook won the individual challenge (Mystery Box Challenge or Elimination Test).
(WIN) The cook was on the winning team in the Team Challenge and was directly advanced to the next round.
(HIGH) The cook was one of the top entries in the Mystery Box Challenge, but did not win, or received considerable praise during an Elimination Test.
(PT) The cook was on the losing team in the Team Challenge or did not win the individual challenge, but won the Pressure Test.
(IN) The cook was not selected as a top entry or bottom entry in an individual challenge.
(IN) The cook was not selected as a top entry or bottom entry in a team challenge.
(IMM) The cook did not have to compete in that round of the competition and was safe from elimination.
(IMM) The cook was selected by Mystery Box Challenge winner and did not have to compete in the Elimination Test.
(PT) The cook was on the losing team in the Team Challenge, competed in the Pressure Test, and advanced.
(NPT) The cook was on the losing team in the Team Challenge, but was exempted from the Pressure Test
(RET) The cook was eliminated but came back to compete to return to the competition.
(LOW) The cook was one of the bottom entries in an individual elimination challenge or pressure test and advanced.
(WDR) The cook withdrew for injury and cannot continue the competition.
(ELIM) The cook was eliminated from MasterChef.

== Episodes ==
No. overall	No. in season	Title	Original release date	Prod. code	CAN viewers (millions)	Rank (week)
46	1	"Special Delivery"	March 2, 2017	401	1.492	4
Season 4 kicks off with twenty-four applicants remotely receiving a package containing rice (along with a typed letter from the judges Alvin Leung, Claudio Aprile and Michael Bonancini explaining the rules of the audition) delivered in the mail by the messengers at their hometowns and workplaces, where they had 20 minutes to gather the ingredients to figure out what signature audition dish they would eventually use to create a rice dish. That ingredient shopping occurred before the applicants set foot in the MasterChef Canada kitchen. At the end of the qualifying cook-off round, the applicants were asked to cover their dishes with a cloche and exit the studio while the judges sampled the dishes in private. After privately tasting all 24 of the dishes, eight cooks whose workstation countertops had been cleared (Aaron, Alice, Alisha, Jordan, Kimberly D., Mai, Miranda and Trevor) were called up to the front and each given a white apron, winning the first eight spots in the Top 12, having made the best audition dishes. Of the other sixteen competitors, eight applicants (whose cloches were empty underneath) were sent home, including Jason, Kimberly C. and Sheila, while the other eight (whose original audition dishes were still underneath their cloches) were given a second chance. For their redemption challenge, the remaining eight cooks were given the choice of specialized pantries put together by each of the judges. Before tasting their dishes at the end of the challenge, Justine and Matt automatically received aprons; of the remaining six, Thea and Barrie were given the final two spots, rounding out the Top 12 while Chris, Jay, Jillian and Nii were eliminated.
47	2	"Home On the Range"	March 9, 2017	402	1.273	16
Mystery Box 1: The first mystery box challenge of the season contained a specific piece of kitchen cutlery equipment from the cooks' own homes. Aaron, Miranda and Trevor made the three best dishes, and Trevor won the challenge despite accidentally shattering his oven door towards the end of the cook-off, with Alice letting him use her oven. Elimination Test 1: Safe from elimination and having automatically advanced to the Top 11, Trevor was presented with the choice of three types of fruits for the other cooks to work with; he picked the stone fruits. He was also able to save either all the men or women from elimination, choosing to save all the men. Trevor was also tasked with assigning the remaining cooks either a sweet (Alisha, Justine, Thea) or savoury (Alice, Kimberly, Mai, Miranda) dish and gave either a salt shaker or sugar to his fellow competitors to determine whether they would either bake a dessert or whip up a savoury protein dish; Alice was upset with being assigned savoury after helping Trevor during the mystery box challenge. Justine and Miranda made the two best dishes and were announced as team captains for the first team challenge of the season. The worst bottom three dishes belonged to Mai, Thea and Alice. Thea was saved first, leaving Mai and Alice on the bottom two, and the judges eliminated Alice.
48	3	"True Patriot Love"	March 16, 2017	403	1.178	16
Team Challenge 1: For their first team challenge of the season, the 11 home cooks were tasked with making a buffet lunch for 105 new Canadian citizens at a citizenship swearing-in ceremony. Each team had to make one curry and one noodle dish, one of which had to be vegetarian, with a salad side for the guests. Justine and Miranda were the Red and White Team captains, respectively. Justine chose Trevor, Aaron, Jordan and Alisha for her team, Miranda chose Mai, Matt, Thea, and Kimberly for her team. The judges gave Barrie (who was the odd man out) the option to picking which team to join, and he chose to join the Red team, who were declared the winners after the judges briefly had to step in and help out both teams towards the end. Pressure Test 1: The home cooks from the White Team had 30 minutes to cook squid ink noodles with a soft boiled egg, including extracting the ink from the sac themselves. Miranda was given the option to save herself or one of her teammates, and she decided to save herself. Thea's pasta dish was considered the best, and she was the first to be sent to safety. Of the remaining home cooks, Mai's unseasoned dish lacked salt, Matt's egg was overcooked, and Kimberly's pasta was undercooked and her egg was cracked. As her dish had the most issues, Kimberly was eliminated.
49	4	"The Blind Leading the Blind"	March 23, 2017	404	1.368	8
Team Challenge 2: The Top 10 home cooks were put into pairs of two and were required to replicate a seven-layer birthday cake, consisting of 4 sponges and 3 types of icing, in honour of Canada's upcoming 150th birthday. The pairs were Justine and Matt, Miranda and Aaron, Barrie and Alisha, Trevor and Thea, and Mai and Jordan. The home cooks tasted the cake blind-folded in five minutes to identify the flavours of the ingredients used and then baked it in 1 hour. The judges declared Justine and Matt the winners who produced the best cake. Elimination Test 2: Season 3 winner Mary Berg visited the MasterChef kitchen. Justine and Matt received immunity from elimination, and were then shown Mary's three favorite comfort foods, one of which the other home cooks had to elevate. They selected her tuna casserole. For their third advantage, Justine and Matt were able to save one cook from elimination at the end of the cook-off round, and they chose to save Thea. The best dish belonged to Aaron, with the second and third best dishes belonging to Alisha and Mai. The judges announced that they were made team captains in their next team challenge. Trevor and Jordan nominated themselves for elimination, knowing that their subpar dishes missed the mark, and Jordan was eliminated.
50	5	"Burger for Bikers"	March 30, 2017	405	1.191	18
Team Challenge 3: The Top 9 were divided into three teams of three and challenged to create gourmet burgers and fries for a group of hungry motorcyclist enthusiasts. Aaron chose Trevor and Thea, forming the Red team. Alisha chose Matt and Barrie, forming the Blue team, while Mai chose Justine and was left with Miranda, forming the Green team. The Green team was declared the winner in a close result by beating the Blue team by 8 orders. Pressure Test 2: The home cooks on the losing Red and Blue teams faced a difficult pressure test of baking a classic French dessert: Mille-feuille, although not all six of them had to participate. One home cook from each of the Red and Blue teams was saved. After asking the team captains' opinions, all of the losing home cooks unanimously decided together amongst themselves as to who would be saved. While Alisha took responsibility for the loss, Aaron decided to save himself, disappointing Thea. The Red Team decided to save Aaron and the Blue Team decided to save Barrie, leaving Thea, Trevor, Matt and Alisha to cook in the pressure test, which tasked the contestants to bake a Mille-feuille. Thea and Matt made the best Mille-feuilles. In the bottom two, Trevor was saved and the judges ultimately declared that Alisha was eliminated.
51	6	"Jamie in the House"	April 6, 2017	406	1.215	18
Mystery Box 2: The theme of the Mystery Box was Italian and Mediterranean cuisine. Chef Jamie Oliver made a special appearance in the MasterChef kitchen. He also announced that the winner of the challenge would also have his/her dish featured on the menu of Jamie's Italian Canada. Barrie, Trevor, and Thea made the three best dishes, and Thea won. Elimination Test 3: The home cooks were tasked with replicating a high-end Japanese bento box in the classic MasterChef tag team challenge. Thea was immune, and she was allowed to save one home cook from elimination, in addition to deciding the teams. She chose Mai, sending both of them to safety. Thea then paired up Justine with Matt, Miranda with Aaron and Trevor with Barrie. Trevor and Barrie produced the best dish. Miranda and Aaron did satisfactory enough to be safe, leaving Justine and Matt in the bottom. The judges ultimately announced that both Justine and Matt were eliminated in a shocking double-elimination, as they couldn't decide which of the two performed the worst in the tag-team challenge,
52	7	"Egg Showdown!"	April 13, 2017	407	1.263	16
Skills Test, Part 1: The Top 6 home cooks were told that a special redemption challenge took place outside the MasterChef kitchen, as Alice returned to the competition after competing against Justine and Matt (See MasterChef Canada: Redemption). The seven cooks then faced a series of pressure tests of progressing difficulty, all featuring egg as the main ingredient. The home cooks had to battle for survival to progress to the next stage of the competition. The first pressure test featured replicating a British pub Scotch egg in 20 minutes using one egg; Barrie and Aaron made the two best Scotch eggs and were sent to safety, along with Thea. Skills Test, Part 2: Alice, Miranda, Mai and Trevor were tasked with making an Eggs Benedict breakfast dish in 10 minutes using two eggs. Mai and Trevor made the two best breakfast dishes and were thus sent to the balcony, leaving Alice and Miranda to face the third and final head-to-head pressure test. Skills Test, Part 3: The final pressure test involved preparing a cheese soufflé in 30 minutes, which would be tasted as soon as finished. Finishing first, Miranda's soufflé was deemed flawless; she assisted Alice (whose soufflé egg whites were deflated). Alice was thus sent home once again.
53	8	"Auberge Anniversary"	April 27, 2017	408	1.282	12
Team Challenge 4: The Top 6 faced the annual MasterChef Restaurant Takeover at judge Michael Bonacini's iconic Auberge du Pommier, an upscale Oliver & Bonacini restaurant celebrating its 30th anniversary specializing in high-end, fine-dining contemporary French cuisine located in Toronto, where Barrie and Aaron were made the captains of the Red and Blue teams by the judges. Barrie chose Trevor and Mai, while Aaron chose Thea and was left with Miranda, rounding out the Blue team. Both teams of three had to prepare two appetizers consisting an artichoke salad and a duck consommé en croute, and two entrees, a beef tenderloin filet steak dish and a ham-wrapped monkfish dish following a demonstration from Chef Michael. Claudio and Alvin walked around the dining room, where they received feedback from their valued VIP diner guests while Michael was running the pass, expediting throughout dinner service. On the Blue team, Aaron burned several steaks that were charred and overcooked, stagnating the flow of dishes while Trevor had to step up to the plate and take charge of the Red Team when they had an undercooked steak sent beck. The next morning, the judges announced the Red team as the winning team, sending Barrie, Trevor and Mai up to the safety of the balcony. Pressure Test 3: As the losing team, Aaron, Thea and Miranda were given 45 minutes to recreate a Moroccan-Vegetable Tajine served with herbed couscous, using an array of vegetables and 28 unmarked spices. Miranda made the best dish and she was sent to safety first. Thea's unseasoned dish tasted bland, which caused her to have a brief emotional breakdown, while Aaron's overspiced dish had a very bitter, overpowering aftertaste from a heavy-handed overabundance of cloves, which made it almost inedible. After Claudio declared that Aaron's dish was the worst, the judges offered Thea, who had been nervously self-doubting herself, the opportunity to voluntarily withdraw from the competition if she felt that she was not ready to move forward throughout the season. Thea affirmed her desire to stay, thereby Aaron was sent home, leaving in sixth place with a job offer from Chef Michael hiring him at his restaurant.
54	9	"Take Five"	May 4, 2017	409	1.296	17
Mystery Box 3: In this challenge, the Top 5 home cooks observed the judges demonstrating their favorite techniques in cooking salmon: glazed, encrusted and poached. Each home cook then used one of these techniques to made a delicious salmon dish. In a random draw, Miranda and Trevor selected "glazed", Barrie picked "encrusted", and Mai and Thea chose "poached". In the end, Miranda, Trevor, and Barrie made the three best salmon dishes, and Miranda won. Elimination Test 4: The home cooks were tasked with making a dish using only five ingredients from the pantry. After selecting their ingredients in the basket, the judges then announced that Miranda, as the winner of the Mystery Box, had the advantage of swapping the others' baskets. Miranda decided to keep her own basket. She then gave Thea's basket to Barrie, Barrie's basket to Trevor, Trevor's basket to Mai, and finally Mai's basket to Thea. Ultimately, Barrie made the best dish, with Trevor's dish also raved. Mai's dish was well-received despite her childlike plating, leaving Miranda and Thea as the bottom two. In the end, despite her initial advantage, Miranda's raw flank steak resulted in her elimination.
55	10	"Harvest Family Dinner"	May 11, 2017	410	1.414	14
Team Challenge 5: The Top 4 quarterfinalists arrived at a farm and orchard in the rural Ontario countryside to compete in pairs of two for their final off-site field team challenge. The final four were surprised by their family member relatives, and tasked with making an elegant family dinner inspired by their loved ones that showcased the autumn harvest. Having made the best dish in the last elimination challenge, Barrie was given the option of choosing his own teammate. He chose Trevor, forming the Red Team, which left Mai and Thea to form the Blue Team by default. Returning to the studio the next morning, Barrie and Trevor won the last team challenge, securing their spots in the Top 3 semi-finals. Pressure Test 4: As the losing team, Mai and Thea faced the final pressure test of the season to determine which of them would earn the last spot in the Top 3 semifinals. The two quarterfinalists were given 1 hour to replicate a complex tropical dessert called the Hawaiian Mountain Cloud. In the end, Thea's dessert inched ahead when it came to flavor and execution, and the judges were very disappointed to find a piece of aluminum in Mai's dessert. As a result, Mai was sent home in fourth place.
56	11	"Sweet Francaise"	May 25, 2017	411	1.226	7
Individual Challenge: Trevor, Barrie and Thea were tasked with baking a mélange of patisseries in two hours to be served to the judges and 45 VIP diner guests, the pastry experts including 11 pastry chefs and 34 children. All three of the semi-finalists patisseries were a mixed bag, but the judges and diners ultimately voted Barrie as the winner of the bake-off. Elimination Test 5: Barrie did not directly advance to the finale and was instead escorted to the pantry, where he was given the opportunity to choose one of three luxury proteins and which proteins to give Trevor and Thea for the final elimination challenge. They had to showcase their proteins in three different ways. Targeting to eliminate Thea, Barrie chose wagyu beef for himself and gave Thea the Nagano pork and left Trevor with the Chanticler chicken. The judges raved Trevor’s standout dish, apart from his bitter, vinegary sauce, and he advanced to the finale first. It came down to Thea’s hideously unappetizing plating and Barrie’s undercooked meat. Ultimately Barrie was eliminated in third place despite his initial advantage, sending Thea to join Trevor in the finale.
57	12	"Season 4 Finale"	June 1, 2017	412	1.412	5
Trevor and Thea faced off against each other head to head in the ring-like arena. Unlike in the previous 3 seasons, they were given three whole hours to continuously work non-stop in order to whip up a three-course meal for the judges, but had to present their appetizer at the end of the first hour, entree at the end of the second hour, and dessert after the third and final hour. Once all three hours expired, they would be judged in private. For the appetizer, Thea prepared a Mexican street corn panna cotta, with zucchini blossoms and jalapeno-lime puree, while Trevor made an octopus and chips appetizer with a deconstructed lemon tartar sauce. For the entree, Trevor cooked a braised lamb shank and lamb tongue with celeriac puree and seasonal vegetables, while Thea presented a braised pork belly and pork cheek tamale with pineapple mole sauce. For dessert, Thea created a café de olla-inspired offering with orange cake, sponge toffee, and cinnamon ice cream, while Trevor served a fallen ice cream cone with mint chocolate gelato and a crème Fraiche whip. Trevor was declared and crowned the winner.
