= MasterChef Canada season 2 =

Season of television series

MasterChef Canada
- Season 2
- No. of episodes: 15

Release
- Original network: CTV
- Original release: February 1 – May 24, 2015

Season chronology
- ← Previous; Season 1 Next → Season 3

The second season of the Canadian competitive reality television series MasterChef Canada premiered on CTV on February 1, 2015 and concluded on May 24. Open casting calls were held over the summer of 2014. Filming began in September 2014 and wrapped up in November 2014. Portuguese-Canadian concrete contractor David Jorge won this season. Jorge, who resides on a hobby farm in the Panorama area of Surrey with his wife and two sons, also guest starred in episodes in Season 3 and Season 5, and competed in the MasterChef Canada: All-Star Family Edition 2016 holiday special, of which he was the runner-up. He is currently the oldest winner of MasterChef Canada.

Following his victory, Jorge teamed up with Top Chef Canada season 3 winner Matthew Stowe to open up S+L Kitchen & Bar (a steak-and-lobster seafood themed restaurant) operated by the Joseph Richard Group, with three locations open across British Columbia as of spring 2018. In the fall of 2015, Jorge signed on a contract with JRG in a partnership that involves working with Ryan Moreno, CEO of the pub/restaurant chain. The first location opened on 200th Street at 84th Avenue in Langley on January 26, 2016. A second location opened on December 23, 2016 at 200–2070 Sumas Way in the Abbotsford Village Shopping Centre. The third location opened up in South Surrey in June 2017.

Quarterfinalist Christopher Siu, who was eliminated in 5th place in the family-reunion quarter-finals, eventually returned to compete again in MasterChef Canada: Back to Win and was crowned the winner. Andrew Al-Khouri, who was originally eliminated in 10th place, also returned to MasterChef Canada: Back to Win, making it all the way to the penultimate semi-finals, finishing 4th.

== Top 16 ==
Contestant	Age	Hometown	Occupation	Status
David Jorge	38	Surrey, British Columbia	Concrete contractor	Winner May 24
Line Pelletier	45	Moncton, New Brunswick	Computer specialist	Runner-Up May 24
Sabrina Poirier	26	Montréal, Quebec	Office manager	Eliminated May 17
Cody Karey	23	Vancouver, British Columbia	Recording artist	Eliminated May 17; Returned April 19; Eliminated April 5
Christopher Siu	24	Markham, Ontario	Pharmacy student	Eliminated May 10
Michael Motamedi	28	Toronto, Ontario	Fashion entrepreneur	Eliminated May 3
Jennifer Innis	33	Vernon, British Columbia	Dental hygienist	Eliminated April 26
Jon Hameister-Ries	29	Vancouver, British Columbia	Former pro football player	Eliminated April 19
Tammy Wood	41	Agassiz, British Columbia	Retail clerk	Eliminated April 12
Andrew Al-Khouri	33	Halifax, Nova Scotia	Tax collection officer	Eliminated April 5
Kristen Dwyer	30	Conception Bay South, Newfoundland and Labrador	Early childhood educator	Eliminated March 29
Kwasi Douglas	35	Whitby, Ontario	Community facilitator	Eliminated March 22
Kevin Gregory	44	Fredericton, New Brunswick	Applications engineer	Eliminated March 8
Debra Pangestu	33	Richmond, British Columbia	Public relations officer	Eliminated March 1
Kyle McKenna	30	Paradise, Newfoundland and Labrador	Bartender	Eliminated February 15
Debbie MacDonald	54	Port Hood, Nova Scotia	Special needs teacher	Eliminated February 15

== Elimination table ==
Place	Contestant	Episode																				
Place	Contestant	3		4	5		6	7		8	9		10		11		12	13		14		15
1	David	IN	IMM	WIN	HIGH	WIN	LOW	WIN	IMM	WPT	WIN	IMM	IMM	IMM	HIGH	LOW	WIN	HIGH	WIN	WIN	IMM	WINNER
2	Line	HIGH	WIN	NPT	IN	IN	WIN	IN	IN	WPT	IN	IN	IMM	IN	HIGH	WIN	WPT	WIN	IMM	IN	WPT	RUNNER-UP
3	Sabrina	IN	IN	PT	IN	WIN	PT	IN	IN	WIN	HIGH	IN	IMM	IN	WIN	IMM	LOW	IN	HIGH	IN	ELIM	
4	Cody	IN	IN	WIN	WIN	LOW	PT	IN	IN	ELIM			RET	LOW	IN	WIN	WIN	HIGH	LOW	ELIM		
5	Christopher	IN	IN	WPT	IN	IN	WPT	WIN	IMM	WIN	IN	WIN	IMM	WIN	IN	IN	WIN	IN	ELIM			
6	Michael	IN	IN	PT	IN	LOW	NPT	HIGH	WIN	WIN	IN	WIN	IMM	LOW	IN	IN	ELIM					
7	Jennifer	IN	IMM	NPT	HIGH	IN	WIN	IN	IN	WIN	IN	LOW	IMM	WIN	IN	ELIM						
8	Jon	WIN	IMM	WIN	IN	IN	NPT	IN	LOW	LOW	HIGH	IN	IMM	ELIM								
9	Tammy	IN	IN	LOW	IN	IN	WIN	IN	LOW	WIN	HIGH	ELIM										
10	Andrew	IN	WIN	WIN	IN	IN	PT	HIGH	WIN	ELIM												
11	Kristen	IN	IN	WIN	IN	IN	WIN	IN	ELIM													
12	Kwasi	IN	LOW	WIN	IN	IN	ELIM															
13	Kevin	HIGH	IN	WIN	IN	ELIM																
14	Debra	IN	IN	ELIM																		
15-16	Kyle	IN	ELIM																			
15-16	Debbie	IN	ELIM																			

In episode 5, Cody forfeited his immunity from his Mystery Box win to cook in the elimination challenge.

(WINNER) This cook won the competition.
(RUNNER-UP) This cook finished in second place.
(WIN) The cook won the individual challenge (Mystery Box Challenge or Elimination Test).
(WIN) The cook was on the winning team in the Team Challenge and was directly advanced to the next round.
(HIGH) The cook was one of the top entries in the individual challenge, but did not win, or received considerable praise during an Elimination Challenge.
(WPT) The cook was on the losing team in the Team Challenge or did not win the individual challenge, but won the Pressure Test.
(IN) The cook was not selected as a top entry or bottom entry in an individual challenge.
(IN) The cook was not selected as a top entry or bottom entry in a team challenge.
(IMM) The cook did not have to compete in that round of the competition and was safe from elimination.
(IMM) The cook was selected by Mystery Box Challenge winner and did not have to compete in the Elimination Test.
(PT) The cook was on the losing team in the Team Challenge, competed in the Pressure Test, and advanced.
(NPT) The cook was on the losing team in the Team Challenge, but was exempted from the Pressure Test
(RET) The cook was eliminated but come back to compete to return to the competition.
(LOW) The cook was one of the bottom entries in an individual elimination challenge or pressure test and advanced.
(LOW) The cook was one of the bottom entries in the Team Challenge, and they advanced.
(ELIM) The cook was eliminated from MasterChef.

== Episodes ==
Season 2 premiered on CTV on February 1, 2015, following its telecast of Super Bowl XLIX. The premiere was originally meant to air on February 8, 2015, but was pushed ahead to air after the game in place of Spun Out, whose second-season premiere was pulled from the slot after cast member J. P. Manoux was charged with voyeurism.

No. overall	No. in season	Title	Original release date	Prod. code	CAN viewers (millions)	Rank (week)
16	1	"Fit to Be Tied"	February 1, 2015	201	1.569	15
As with the previous season, 50 amateur home cooks were tasked with cooking their signature dish for judges Michael Bonacini, Alvin Leung and Claudio Aprile; an auditioning cook required at least two "yes" votes in order to obtain a white apron. This episode featured the auditions of Sabrina, Jon, Kristal, Michael, Tammy, Jennifer and David; all except Kristal earned an apron.
17	2	"Patriotic Pantry"	February 8, 2015	202	1.541	25
After the auditions wrapped up, the Top 25 were brought into the MasterChef Canada kitchen for another challenge to determine the Top 16. 16 of them were told to stand in front of a bench. The other nine: Christopher, David, Debbie, Debra, Jennifer, Kevin, Kristen, Kwasi and Tammy - automatically advanced as their signature dishes were deemed the best of the auditions. The remaining 16 had 60 minutes to prepare a Canadian-themed dish inspired by the red-and-white Canadian flag-shaped pantry behind them. After the challenge, two groups were initially called forward. The former, consisting of Andrew, Cody, Kyle and Sabrina, advance, while the other group, featuring Gav, Nikita, Robert, Nathan and Mina were sent home. The remaining six home cooks' dishes were tasted: Inder and Deanna were eliminated while Line and Michael advanced, leaving Lauren and Jon to fight for the last spot. Jon's dish was narrowly deemed the better of the two, and Lauren was eliminated, rounding out the Top 16.
18	3	"Constant Cravings"	February 15, 2015	203	1.513	29
Mystery Box 1: The first mystery box challenge of the season featured a selection of various sweet and savory ingredients: pineapple, maple syrup, Philadelphia cream cheese, berries, phyllo pastry, pork chop, bacon and kale. Line, Jon and Kevin were the top three and Jon's trio of cream cheese tarts was the winning dish. Elimination Test 1: The other home cooks had to make their own version of one of three Asian dishes, and Jon picked the stir fry (over the ramen and curry with roti. He was allowed to save two from elimination, one before and after the challenge, ultimately selecting David and Jennifer, the latter of whom had been struggling. Andrew's crispy ginger beef with Singapore-style rice and Line's crispy sesame beef with enoki mushrooms were the best, making them team captains in the following challenge. Kwasi and Debbie's stir fries lacked flavor, while Kyle's stir fry with sesame-crusted cod was poorly presented and the flavors clashed. In a surprise, Debbie and Kyle were both eliminated.
19	4	"Juggling Act"	March 1, 2015	204	1.448	22
Team Challenge 1: In the first team challenge of the season, they had to cook for the cast and crew of Cirque du Soleil. Andrew was the Red team captain, and Line was the Blue team captain. Andrew chose David, Kevin, Jon, Cody, Kristen and Kwasi, while Line chose Tammy, Sabrina, Debra, Christopher, Michael and was left with Jennifer. The teams had to serve a nice and healthy buffet style meal, and the Red team won, sending the Blue team to the pressure test. Pressure Test 1: In the pressure test of the season, the home cooks on the Blue team were tasked with making a tourtiere. The Red team was allowed to save one home cook, and they picked Jennifer. Line was then given an option to either save herself or one of her teammates, and she chose to save herself (Afterwards, she got dehydrated and was sent to the nearest hospital). Christopher made the best tourtiere and was sent to safety, as did Sabrina and Michael, leaving Debra and Tammy to face elimination, and Debra was eliminated.
20	5	"Slice of Life"	March 8, 2015	205	1.684	15
Mystery Box 2: Before the mystery box challenge, Line returned to the MasterChef kitchen after being treated for dehydration. In the challenge, the home cooks had to make a pizza from scratch. David, Jennifer, and Cody made the three best dishes, and Cody won. Elimination Test 2: The elimination challenge saw the return of season one winner Eric Chong. Cody was able to choose one of three ingredients that signified Eric's success on his culinary journey for the other cooks to use. Targeting David, he chose black truffle; however, Cody forfeited his immunity and chose to cook in the elimination challenge, desperately wanting to work with the ingredient much to the surprise of the judges. David and Sabrina made the two best dishes. The worst three dishes belong to Cody, Kevin and Michael, who was saved first and Kevin was eliminated.
21	6	"One Potato, Two Potato"	March 22, 2015	206	1.659	10
Team Challenge 2: The next team challenge took place on the campus of the University of Guelph in Guelph, Ontario. The three teams were asked to prepare their own version of poutine dishes to the students, with the two losing teams going into the pressure test. David and Sabrina were the captains of the Red and Blue Team respectively, and David chose Line as the Green Team captain. David chose Andrew, Christopher and Michael for the Red Team, Sabrina chose Jon, Cody and Kwasi for the Blue Team, and Line chose Tammy, Kristen and Jennifer for the Green Team. Each team had to create a dish from different proteins selected by David (pork for Red, beef for Blue and chicken for Green). Despite several initial set-backs, Line's Green Team emerged victorious by a margin of seven votes. Pressure Test 2: The Red and Blue Teams had to recreate a dish of tortellini covered in a cheese sauce. Both David and Sabrina were allowed to exempt themselves or one member of their team from the pressure test. David chose to save Michael while Sabrina chose to save Jon. Christopher made the best tortellini, while Sabrina, Cody and Andrew also performed well enough to be sent to safety, leaving Kwasi and David on the bottom to face elimination; Kwasi was eliminated.
22	7	"No Piece of Cake"	March 29, 2015	207	1.594	16
Mystery Box 3: The home cooks were tasked with baking a four-layered birthday cake, and the judges announced that there would be two winners. Michael, Christopher, David, and Andrew baked the four best cakes, and Christopher and David won. Elimination Test 3: Both David and Christopher were safe from elimination. The judges presented them with three different "odd" culinary combinations, each of which three home cooks had to cook with. They gave bacon with chocolate to Cody, Tammy and Sabrina, salmon with licorice to Michael, Jennifer, and Jon, and chorizo sausage with grape jelly to Andrew, Kristen, and Line. Michael and Andrew made the two best dishes, making them team captains for their next team challenge. The worst three dishes belonged to Kristen, Jon and Tammy; Tammy was the first to be sent to safety, and Kristen was eliminated.
23	8	"Wedding on the Waves"	April 5, 2015	208	1.652	12
Team Challenge 3: In their next team challenge, the top ten home cooks had to make canapes and French-inspired dishes, catering for a harbor cruise wedding. Michael and Andrew were the captains of the Red and Blue teams respectively. With the first pick, Michael chose Christopher, Sabrina, Tammy and Jennifer, while Andrew chose David, Cody, Line and was left with Jon, and the Red team won the challenge. Pressure Test 3: The home cooks from the Blue team had to recreate a classic French fruit tart. The judges announced that two home cooks would be sent home by the end of the challenge, which required all five cooks to participate. David and Line were sent to safety for having the best fruit tarts, and Andrew, Cody and Jon landed in the bottom. Jon was then sent to safety. As a result, both Andrew and Cody were sent packing.
24	9	"Good Things in Small Packages"	April 12, 2015	209	1.814	13
Mystery Box 4: Chef Graham Elliot from MasterChef U.S. appeared as a guest judge for the mystery box challenge, the theme of which was small ingredients. Tammy, Sabrina, Jon, and David made the four best dishes, and David won. Elimination Test 4: David was given immunity and was presented with three types of ingredients from the sea. Targeting Christopher, he chose sea snails. After the home cooks grabbed their ingredients from the pantry, the judges announced that they had to switch ingredients. Line had Jon's ingredient, Jon had Jennifer's ingredient, Jennifer had Sabrina's ingredient, Sabrina had Tammy's ingredient, Tammy had Christopher's ingredient, Christopher had Michael's ingredient, and Michael had Line's ingredient. Christopher and Michael made the two best dishes. The worst two dishes belonged to Jennifer and Tammy; Tammy was eliminated.
25	10	"Walking on Eggshells"	April 19, 2015	210	1.611	13
Reinstation: Cody, Kevin, and Andrew were invited back by the judges for a second chance to win back a spot in the competition in an egg-themed redemption challenge. They had eight minutes to replicate three different egg dishes: an omelette, poached egg and soft-boiled egg, and Cody rejoined the competition. Elimination Test 5: Cody was given a chance to choose another fellow home cook for the selection of the dish he and the others had to cook in their next challenge, and the chosen cook also received immunity. Cody chose David, who chose Michael's sea scallop mousse (over Claudio's Tom Yum soup and Alvin's taro root dumplings). Christopher's mousse was the best dish of the night and Jennifer was also highly praised despite forgetting her eggs. Michael's mousse was deemed the best of the worst, leaving Cody and Jon to face elimination, and Jon was eliminated.
26	11	"Tea for Two"	April 26, 2015	211	1.637	21
Mystery Box 5: The Top 7 home cooks were given a mystery box consisting of a rack of lamb, pears, pearl onions, goat cheese, sweet potatoes, pistachios, couscous, Dijon mustard, and red wine. Claudio joined in on the task and cooked alongside the contestants in this cook-off to inspire them. At the end of the mystery box round, Sabrina, Line, and David made the three best dishes, and Sabrina won. Elimination Test 6: The home cooks had to recreate an English afternoon tea tray consisting of various patisseries, such as raspberry tarts with vanilla bean pastry cream, profiteroles filled with whipped cream drizzled with chocolate sauce on the outside and sandwiches, in a tag team challenge. Sabrina was immune from the challenge and she got to choose the teams. Targeting Line and David, she paired Cody with Line, and David with Jennifer, leaving Christopher with Michael by default. Cody and Line won the tag-team challenge, becoming team captains in the next team challenge while David and Jennifer were singled out the bottom team, and Jennifer was sent home in seventh place.
27	12	"Fine Dining Under Fire"	May 3, 2015	212	1.603	17
Team Challenge 4: The Top 6 home cooks arrived in bustling downtown Toronto's Financial District, where Line and Cody (who both won the previous elimination challenge with their tag-team pairing) were appointed team captains by the judges for the last team challenge of the season, the annual MasterChef Restaurant Takeover at Canoe, Michael Bonacini's high end, fine-dining, upscale restaurant. Line picked Sabrina and Michael, forming the Red Team. Cody selected David and was left with Christopher by default, rounding out the Blue Team. They had to prepare two seafood appetizers: a French onion consommé with Swiss cheese and bone marrow and a Dungeness crab meat dish with taro chips, tuna and strawberries as well as two savory entrees: a pan-seared Atlantic salmon dish and a pan-roasted beef tenderloin filet steak dish. The Blue Team had a greasy soup dish that had to be re-fired because it was sent back to the kitchen ice cold, and they omitted the strawberry component for their other appetizer, but eventually stepped up their game as they smoothly sent out flawless savory protein entree dishes the rest of the dinner service evening. The Red Team though never recovered from a slow start, and Sabrina stepped in to lead when Line got overwhelmed. Chef Bonacini also got in there to help pump out the last several orders of entrees when the team stalled again. After consulting the 60 VIP diner guests comments, the judges ultimately gave the win to the Blue team, sending Cody, David and Christopher up to safety on the balcony. Pressure Test 4: Line, Michael, and Sabrina had 45 minutes to replicate a fried chicken dish with mashed potatoes, guiness brown gravy and blanched green beans. While all three of them exceptionally nailed the chicken breast, Line made the best overall dish of the night and was sent to safety first. Sabrina received for criticism for her gravy, but Michael ultimately had the much bigger flaw in serving up a bloody raw chicken leg, and the latter was thus sent home.
28	13	"From Home, With Love"	May 10, 2015	213	2.050	7
Mystery Box 6: In the quarterfinals, the Top 5 quarterfinalists were visited by their loved ones to inspire them for the last mystery box consisting of peanut butter, chocolate, apples, Romanesco cauliflower, miso, Jasmine rice, Sriracha, and a protein chosen by their family members. They had 1 hour to make two dishes, one sweet dessert and one savory protein dish. David, Cody, and Line were the top three, and Line won with her maple ginger garlic glazed salmon and chocolate peanut butter cookies. Elimination Test 7: Line was safe from elimination and automatically advanced to the Top 4 semi-finals. The theme of the elimination challenge was cooking tools, and Line was shown four different pieces of kitchen equipment. Targeting David, she gave him the ice cream maker, Cody the crepe pan, Christopher the meat grinder, and Sabrina the pressure cooker. David won the challenge with his cobbler and lemon, vanilla thyme mint ice cream, while Cody and Christopher were singled out on the bottom two for their substandard, lacklustre dishes. The judges decided to save Cody, as they felt that Christopher's stale and unseasoned dish, which was bland and tasteless had missed the mark. With the weakest dish, Christopher was sent home in fifth place.
29	14	"The Trip to Bountiful"	May 17, 2015	214	1.462	19
Elimination Test 8: In the penultimate Top 4 semi-finals, the final four remaining semifinalists arrived at Cave Spring Vineyard, an off-site farm and vineyard in the Niagara region of Southern Ontario's rural countryside, to cook individually for 18 farmers and the 3 judges. They had 95 minutes to whip up 21 dishes and had to butcher and fillet 21 portions of their protein from scratch in that timeframe. The semifinalist with the best dish advanced to the finale, while the semifinalist with the weakest dish was eliminated, while the remaining two semifinalists battled it out in the last pressure test of the season. David got to choose the proteins to all of the final four semifinalists. David chose the lean, gamey venison loin for himself, and assigned pickerel to Cody, rabbit to Sabrina and squab to Line. Back in the kitchen the following day, the judges announced that the best dish of the night belonged to David, who automatically advanced straight to the finale. Despite his excellence in spectacular, artistic plating and flawlessly nailing the cook on his fish to a tee, the judges felt that Cody's unseasoned fish dish, which tasted bland was a misfire deemed just slightly subpar, and he was sent home once again, finishing fourth. Pressure Test 5: For the last spot in the finale, Sabrina and Line were left to face one final decisive Pressure Test featuring three technical, stunningly magnificent chocolate desserts consisting of a dark chocolate brownie with homemade vanilla ice cream, white chocolate crème brûlée, and milk chocolate mousse with a liquid passion fruit coulis in the center that they had to replicate in 90 minutes. Sabrina and Line were neck-and-neck serving up masterful replications, but Sabrina’s rock-hard, dense and stale brownie and unevenly sugared crème brûlée which had a bitter aftertaste from the burnt sugar resulted the judges giving Line (who had a better brownie) the finale spot, sending Sabrina home in third place.
30	15	"Ring of Fire"	May 24, 2015	215	2.079	4
The two finalists will be creating a three-course meal for the judges in a head-to-head battle. For the appetizer, Line served foie gras with lobster, while David made tomatoes five ways with sweetbread. For the entrée, Line served an elk tenderloin in a potato forest, while David served wild boar belly with geoduck clams. For dessert, Line made a cheese plate with chocolate olive bread, pistachio brittle and candied apricot, while David made a lemon curd parfait with graham sponge. David was declared the winner.
