= MasterChef Canada =

Canadian cooking reality television series

- Genre: Reality competition; Cookery
- Created by: Franc Roddam
- Directed by: Dave Russell
- Judges: Claudio Aprile; Michael Bonacini; Alvin Leung; Hugh Acheson; Mary Berg; Craig Wong
- Narrated by: Charlie Ryan (2014–2021)
- Country of origin: Canada
- Original language: English
- No. of seasons: 9
- No. of episodes: 113 (list of episodes)

Production
- Executive producers: Guy O'Sullivan; Cathie James; Elisabeth Murdoch; Nanci Maclean; Scott McGillivray; Justin Stockman; Markie Emery
- Production locations: Etobicoke, Toronto, Ontario
- Running time: 44 minutes
- Production companies: Banijay Rights; Proper Television (2014–2021); McGillivray Entertainment Media (2025–present); Bell Media

Original release
- Network: CTV
- Release: January 20, 2014 – present

MasterChef Canada is a Canadian competitive culinary reality TV show, part of the MasterChef franchise and copied off from the original British show, open to self-taught amateur home cooks across Canada. It premiered on CTV on January 20, 2014, and has since aired its eighth season.

The first seven seasons of MasterChef Canada starred three judges: Claudio Aprile, Michael Bonacini and Alvin Leung, were narrated by Charlie Ryan and produced by Endemol Shine International and Proper Television. The first six seasons were produced under the executive production of Guy O'Sullivan.

After a three-year hiatus, CTV announced on October 22, 2024, an eighth season of the show for the 2025–26 season, to be produced by Toronto-based McGillivray Entertainment Media (MEM). Filmed in early 2025, the season ran from October 2, 2025 to December 16, 2025, with a new judging panel that consists of Season 3 winner Mary Berg, Toronto chef and restaurateur Craig Wong, and chef and former Top Chef judge Hugh Acheson. In conjunction with the series' revival, the American MasterChef series would relocate to the Canadian soundstage beginning with season 16. In December 2025, CTV renewed MasterChef Canada for a ninth season, with Berg, Wong and Acheson returning as judges. The season, filmed in early 2026, premiered on September 22, 2026.

== Format ==
On MasterChef Canada, amateur, self-taught non-professional home cooks are given the opportunity to compete individually in a series of gruelling individual culinary cook-off challenges to win a trophy, a $100,000 CAD cash prize money, and the title of MasterChef Canada to realize their culinary dreams. Each season generally begins with a larger group of applicants invited to Toronto compete in an initial challenge or series of challenges in order to win a coveted white apron and a spot in the primary stages of the competition. Alvin Leung, Claudio Aprile, and Michael Bonancini served as the series' judges for the first seven seasons of the series. Craig Wong, Hugh Acheson, and Mary Berg have been serving as judges since season 8.

In the first two seasons of MasterChef Canada, fifty hopeful applicants were given the opportunity to prepare and present their audition signature dish to judges Leung, Aprile and Bonacini, where a "yes" vote (concerning whether a contestant's dish is worthy of the judges' approval) from at least two of the three judges was required in order to win the coveted white apron. Those who were successful were then presented with an additional challenge to determine which contestants deserved a spot in the Top 16; over a third of the apron-winners were eliminated at that stage. The third season featured a unique spin on the original auditioning format, in that three unanimous thumbs-up "yes" votes were required from all three judges unanimously to win an apron, while three "no" votes eliminated a hopeful applicant, and a second chance battle between those with either one or two "yes" votes was then held to determine the remaining competitors who would advance to the Top 14. Later seasons (except for season 7, which featured returning contestants from previous seasons) streamlined the audition process by facing smaller groups of contestants (fifteen to twenty-four applicants) with more specific, qualifying cook-off challenge rounds with only twelve aprons up for grabs.

With exceptions to the rule, the primary phase of the competition on MasterChef Canada involved a two consecutive cook-off challenge per episode format cycle, in which two consecutive challenges were held in an episode; the former challenge would grant immunity and/or advantage(s) to one or more competitors, and the latter challenge would result in at least one competitors being permanently eliminated from the competition. This cycle of challenges would be repeated until a small number of home cooks remain, usually three or four, in which each season holds a unique series of semifinalist challenges before a final two (or three) competitors are named. The main two-episode cycle's challenges generally consist of:

- Mystery Box Challenge: The competitors are all given a box with the exact same things. The box usually conceals of specific ingredients (fruit, vegetables, seafood, meat, fish, etc.) or a required kitchen utensil underneath, and the contestants must utilize only those ingredients or utensil (sometimes with an additional pantry of staples) to create an elevated, MasterChef Canada-worthy dish within a set amount of time. Sometimes, a special guest may also appear to inspire the cooks and may serve as a guest judge for the challenge. At the end of the challenge, the judges take a quick look at all of the completed dishes and usually call forward the three most promising dishes up for tasting. A single winner from these three is usually named, and the competitor is then invited to join the judges in the pantry to hear about the advantage won - this typically includes a form of control over the upcoming elimination challenges, as well as occasionally immunity from the elimination challenge that night.
- Elimination Challenge: Competitors are tasked with completing a specific challenge directly inspired by the decision(s) of the winner of the mystery box challenge. At the end of the challenge each of the contestant's dishes are brought up separately for evaluation and critiquing by the judges. Usually the two or three best competitors in the elimination challenge are named opposing team captains in the upcoming team challenge. The judges then call forward a bottom two or three, from which at least one cook is eliminated permanently from the competition.
- Team Challenge: The competitors arrive at an off-site location (beach, carnival, airbase, wedding, school, etc.) and are split into two or three teams by either the judges or team captains (who themselves are either decided by the judges directly or the results of the previous elimination challenge). The teams are asked to serve a single-dish or multi-course meal for a set group of diners; the winning team is decided either by voting from the diners or by the call of the judges themselves. The winning team is exempt from the upcoming pressure test, while the losing team(s) are to individually cook for their lives. Typically when there are six competitors remaining, the team challenge is a Restaurant Takeover challenge, in which cooks take over a well-known restaurant (sometimes owned by one of the judges) for a set service.
- Pressure Test: Competitors who lost the previous team challenge are required to compete against one another back in the MasterChef Canada kitchen; occasionally, before the challenge begins competitors may be saved from partaking in the pressure test by either the judges, the winning team, the losing team's captain, or team consensus. Often requiring competitors to replicate a technically complicated dish predetermined by the judges, all of the dishes are evaluated and critiqued by the judges. Those who rise to the occasion and put out up-to-standard dishes are sent to safety on the balcony, while the weakest cooks are faced with elimination; at least one cook is permanently eliminated from the competition.

This cycle is occasionally disrupted for special challenges following double eliminations, in which challenges such as a skills test or gauntlet can take place. Additionally, on several occasions, there have been opportunities for selected competitors to win their way back into the competition through anywhere from one to three challenges.

After a final two (or three) competitors are determined through a unique-to-each-season semifinalist challenge sequence, the finalists are given their final challenge: they will compete head-to-head in a three-hour, three-course (appetizer, entrée, dessert) final challenge while friends, family and former competitors spectate and cheer them on. Each course is judged privately by the judges; since season 4, the finalists are required to continuously cook each course non-stop for three whole hours without rest. After all of the courses have been sampled, and the judges have deliberated, a winner is eventually crowned - the winner receives a trophy, a $100,000 CAD cash prize money, and the title of MasterChef Canada.

== Judges ==
=== Season 1–7 ===
- Claudio Aprile, chef and owner of Toronto restaurant Xango.
- Michael Bonacini, chef and co-owner of the Oliver & Bonacini (O&B) hospitality family of Toronto restaurants Jump, Canoe, Luma and Bannock.
- Alvin Leung, chef and owner of Michelin-starred restaurants Bo Innovation in Hong Kong and Bo London in London, UK.

Additionally, several guest judges have appeared throughout the first seven seasons for specific challenges, such as Joe Bastianich, Graham Elliot, Chris Hadfield and Tessa Virtue.

=== Season 8–present ===
- Hugh Acheson, former Top Chef judge
- Mary Berg, cook, TV host and winner of Season 3
- Craig Wong, chef and owner of Toronto restaurant Patois.

== Seasons ==
Season	Episodes	Time slot (ET/PT)	Originally aired (Canadian and U.S. dates)			Viewership in Canada					Finalists	Winner	Runner-up
Season	Episodes	Time slot (ET/PT)	Originally aired (Canadian and U.S. dates)			Viewers (millions)	18-49 (age)	18-34 (age)	25-54 (age)	Show rank	Finalists	Winner	Runner-up
Season	Episodes	Time slot (ET/PT)	Season premiere	Season finale	TV season	Viewers (millions)	18-49 (age)	18-34 (age)	25-54 (age)	Show rank	Finalists	Winner	Runner-up
1	15	Mondays at 8 p.m.	January 20, 2014	April 28, 2014	2013–14	1.8	averaged 788,000	–	averaged 819,000	Canada's 2nd Most-Watched Canadian Series	16	Eric Chong	Marida Mohammed
2	15	Sundays at 7 p.m.	February 1, 2015	May 24, 2015	2014–15	1.4	–	–	–	–	16	David Jorge	Line Pelletier
3	15	Sundays at 7 p.m.	February 14, 2016	June 19, 2016	2015–16	1.5	–	–	631,000 15th most watched	Canada's 3rd Most-Watched Competition Series 15th overall	14	Mary Berg	Jeremy Senaris
4	12	Thursdays at 9 p.m. and Sundays at 4 p.m.	March 2, 2017	June 1, 2017	2016–17	1.4	12th most watched	10th most watched	11th most watched	-	12	Trevor Connie	Thea VanHerwaarden
5	12	Tuesdays at 9 p.m. and Sundays at 4 p.m.	April 3, 2018	June 19, 2018	2017–18	–	–	–	–	–	12	Beccy Stables	Andy Hay
6	12	Mondays at 8 p.m.	April 8, 2019	June 10, 2019	2018–19	–	–	–	–	–	12	Jennifer Crawford	Andre Bhagwandat
7	12	Sundays at 9 p.m.	February 14, 2021	May 16, 2021	2020–21	–	–	–	–	–	12	Christopher Siu	Andy Hay & Thea VanHerwaarden
8	11	Tuesdays at 8 p.m.	October 2, 2025	December 16, 2025	2025–26	–	–	–	–	–	12	Veronica Wu	Marianne Smeaton & Liz Worndl
9	11	Tuesdays at 7 p.m.	September 22, 2026	TBA	2026–27	–	–	–	–	–	12	TBA	TBA

=== Specials ===
Title	Original release date	Canadian viewers (thousands)
"MasterChef Canada: A Holiday Special"	December 15, 2014	1407
Four home cooks (Dora Cote, Marida Mohammed, Pino DiCerbo, and Tammara Behl) from Season 1 return to the kitchen, joined by spouses, parents, and siblings as they compete in a series of festive food challenges for the chance to win $10,000 for the charity of their choice. In the end, Tammara placed fourth, Marida placed third, Dora was the runner-up, and Pino was announced the winner.
"MasterChef Canada: All-Star Family Edition"	December 5, 2016	910
The first three MasterChef Canada champions (Eric Chong, David Jorge, Mary Berg) and the winner of Holiday Special (Pino DiCerbo) are joined by their families to compete in four increasingly difficult culinary challenges: the Better-Half Skills Race, the Mother and Child Mystery Box, the Bossy Sibling Coaching Challenge, and the Family Feast Team Cook; the grand prize is $10,000 for the charity of the family's choice. After the first two competitors are eliminated, in a final challenge the two remaining chefs were joined by previous MasterChef Canada competitors Julie Miguel, Dora Cote (season one), Line Pelletier, Christopher Siu (season two), Jeremy Senaris and Veronica Cham (season three) as assistant sous chefs. In the end, Eric placed fourth, Mary placed third, David was the runner-up, and Pino was once again announced as the winner.
