= R&D (restaurant) =

Asian fusion restaurant in Toronto, Ontario, Canada

Coordinates: 43°39′6.16″N 79°23′49.82″W

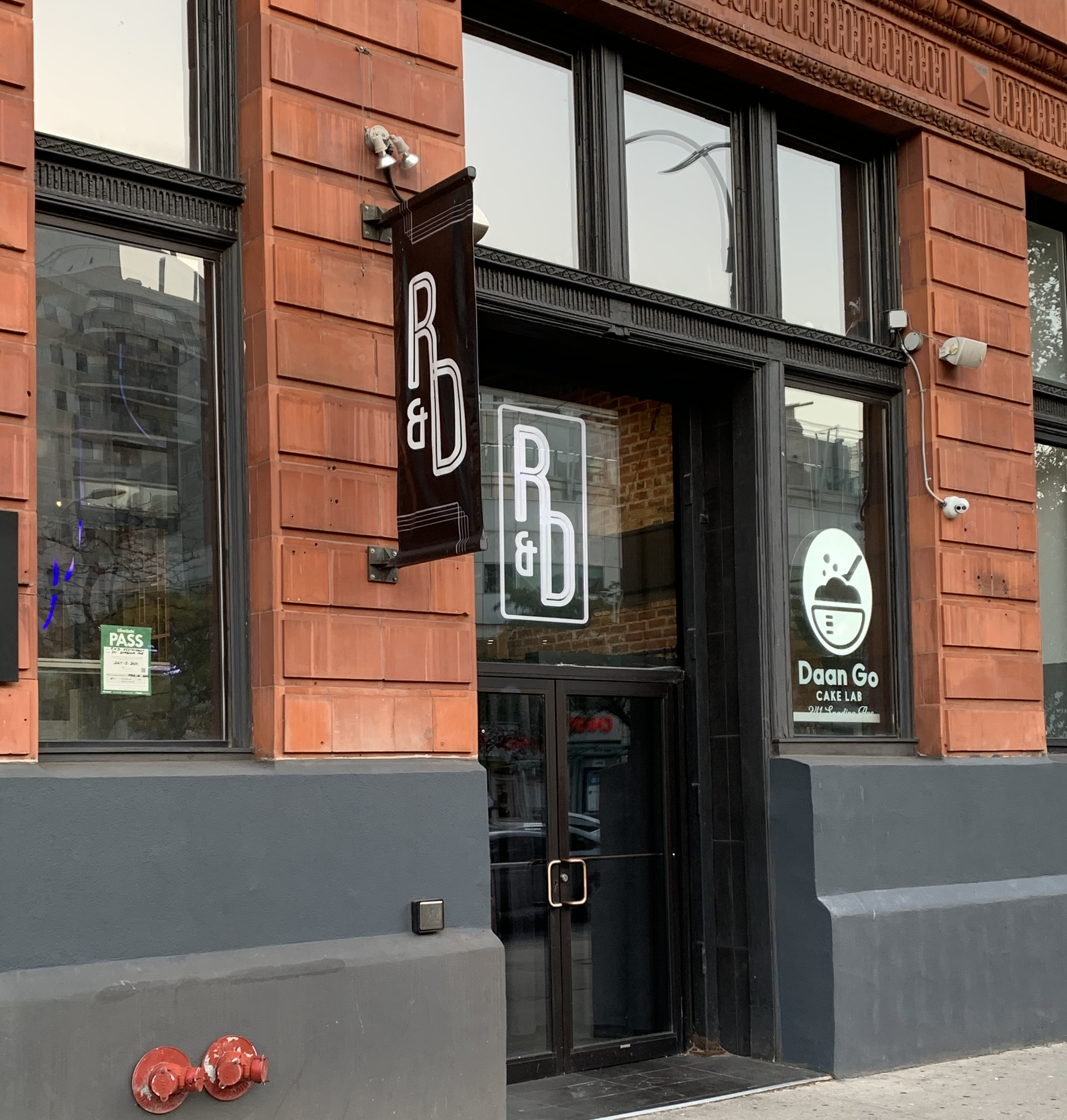
- The restaurant in 2024
- Interactive map of R&D

Restaurant information
- Established: April 7, 2015
- Owners: Alvin Leung; Eric Chong
- Head chef: Eric Chong
- Food type: Asian Fusion; Chinese
- Rating: Bib Gourmand (Michelin Guide)
- Location: 241 Spadina Avenue, Toronto, Ontario, Canada
- Website: www.rdspadina.com

R&D is an Asian Fusion restaurant located in Toronto, Ontario, Canada.

The restaurant is co-owned by Alvin Leung, known for his 3 Michelin-starred Hong Kong restaurant Bo Innovation, and Eric Chong, the inaugural winner of culinary reality competition show MasterChef Canada.

== History ==
The restaurant opened in 2015 in Toronto's Chinatown neighbourhood, in collaboration between Leung and Chong, who met on MasterChef Canada. Chong was a competitor on the show's first season, while Leung was one of three judges on the show. After winning the competition, Chong received an offer from Leung to train with him in Hong Kong and eventually open a restaurant together.

The business's name, R&D, stands for Rebel & Demon - a moniker created to reflect the personalities of both chefs. Chong is labeled the "Rebel" for pursuing a career in cooking despite his family's initial wishes for him to remain in engineering, while Leung is known as the "Demon Chef". R&D's meaning is two-fold, also reflecting both chefs' engineering backgrounds, where 'r&d' (research and development) is an important aspect of the field.

Chong initially started as the sous-chef for the restaurant, while the title of executive chef was given to Nelson Tsai. Chong took over the reins as executive chef a year following the restaurant's opening.

In November 2026, Chong announced that the restaurant would close on December 31 upon the expiration of its lease, allowing him to focus on his other establishment, the Michelin-starred aKin.

== Cuisine and notable dishes ==
The restaurant primarily serves Asian fusion dishes, anchored by Chinese cuisine and Canadian ingredients. It also draws upon French and Korean cooking techniques. A core part of the restaurant's menu is its 'Canadian take on traditional Chinese dim sum', serving items such as char siu bao in icing sugar-topped "Mexico buns" and fun guo filled with chicken and black truffle.

Chef Eric Chong, and the restaurant's, signature dish is the wok lobster (stylized: @WOK_LOBSTER) - a butter-poached lobster chow mein based on the same dish which Chong served in the final round of his MasterChef win.

== Recognition ==
The business was named a Bib Gourmand restaurant by the Michelin Guide at Toronto's 2022 Michelin Guide ceremony, and retained this recognition each year following. A Bib Gourmand recognition is awarded to restaurants who offer "exceptionally good food at moderate prices".

== See also ==
- List of Michelin Bib Gourmand restaurants in Canada
