= RIVR Media =

American television production company

- Founded: Knoxville, Tennessee
- Headquarters: United States
- Key people: Dee Haslam and Lori Golden-Stryer
- Website: www.rivr.com

RIVR Media is an American-based TV production company, specializing in reality and documentary programming. RIVR is responsible for Fixer to Fabulous, Whale Wars, Trading Spaces, Escaping Polygamy, Fat Guys in the Woods, Renovation Realities, Going RV, Friday Night Impossible with Jerry Rice, Great American Heroes featuring Trace Adkins, Run My Renovation, and much more. It provides programming for cable networks, including A&E, HGTV, DIY Network, GAC, Lifetime Movie Network, MTV, Fine Living, Discovery Channel, Travel Channel, Weather Channel, History Channel, ESPN, Animal Planet, Game Show Network, TLC, Nickelodeon, Food Network, Court TV and TNN.

RIVR's production credits include documentaries, reality series, sitcoms, travel series, sports entertainment, and post-production services.

RIVR Media is owned by partners Dee Haslam and Lori Golden-Stryer, and is located in Knoxville, Tennessee. Both Haslam and Stryer are Executive Producers for the company. Lori Golden-Stryer is CEO. She and HGTV co-founder, Bob Baskerville, are partners and co-owners of RIVR Studios, newly-renovated facilities in Knoxville, available to rent for shoots. After 20 years at RIVR, Rob Lundgren retired in 2019.

== Company history ==
RIVR Media originally derives from Bagwell Communications, run by Ross Bagwell Sr. and Ross Bagwell Jr., a Knoxville Tennessee-based advertising agency. In 1982 Bagwell Communications formed a company named 'Cinetel Productions' and engaged with the cable network The Nashville Network (TNN) to produce 415 episodes of I-40 Paradise.

Over the next ten years, Cinetel developed programs for A&E, the History Channel, the Discovery Channel, The Learning Channel, Travel Channel, Nickelodeon, and The Nashville Network. In 1994 Cinetel was sold to Scripps Howard, a national media company looking to launch HGTV. In 1998, Cinetel was renamed Scripps Productions. After the acquisition, the Bagwells formed a new company, Bagwell Entertainment LLC / Ross Television Productions, and continued producing programs for a variety of cable networks, including HGTV.

In 1999, Dee Haslam and business partner Rob Lundgren assumed control of Bagwell Entertainment renaming the company RIVR Media. In 2000 RIVR established RIVR Media Interactive—now RIVR Digital, which focuses on short form video production and marketing. In 2002 RIVR established RIVR Media Studios, a subsidiary focused on for-hire production and post-production services.

== List of shows produced ==
- Trading Spaces on TLC
- Whale Wars on Animal Planet
- Renovation Realities on DIY
- Fat Guys in the Woods on The Weather Channel
- Fixer to Fabulous on HGTV
- Friday Night Impossible with Jerry Rice on GAC
- Escaping Polygamy on Lifetime Movie Network
- Great American Heroes featuring Trace Adkins on GAC
- Going RV on GAC
- Warehouse Warriors on DIY
- Run My Renovation on DIY
- All Star Kitchen Makeover on the Food Network
- America's Castles on A&E
- America's Riverboat Casinos on the Travel Channel
- An Evening with Louis Grizzard on TNN
- Appalachian Stories on the Travel Channel
- Backyard Habitat on Animal Planet
- Blog Cabin on DIY
- Catastrophe Inc. on DIY
- Classic Car Restoration on DIY
- Classic Rides on DIY
- Club Dance on TNN
- Dance Line on TNN
- Dancin' at the Hot Spots on TNN
- Date Plate on the Food Network
- Divine Canine on Animal Planet
- DIY to the Rescue on DIY
- Earthguide on the Discovery Channel
- Easy Does It on the Discovery Channel
- Ed the Plumber on DIY
- Elvis Presley's Graceland on the Discovery Channel
- Elvis Presley's Memphis on the Travel Channel
- Exploring America on the Travel Channel
- Family Table with Naomi Judd on the Food Network
- Floors, Doors & Windows on DIY
- Freeform Furniture on DIY
- Gambling Games – Beating the House on the Discovery Channel
- Gambling Games – Why the House Wins on the Discovery Channel
- Garage Mahal on DIY
- Good Life with Eddie Ellis on HGTV
- Great Train Stations on the History Channel
- Grounds for Improvement on DIY
- Happy Trails Theatre on TNN
- Hardscapes on DIY
- Help on the Homefront on DIY
- Hey Dude on Nickelodeon
- High Roller's Vegas on the Discovery Channel
- High Roller's Vegas 2 – The New Breed on the Discovery Channel
- Homebodies on TLC
- Homebuilding Digest on HGTV
- The Human Canvas on TLC
- Human Canvas 2 – Scared Skin on TLC
- I-40 Paradise on TNN
- Kitchen Accomplished on the Food Network
- Knight School on ESPN
- Lie Detector on Court TV
- Little People: Big Conventions on the Travel Channel
- Mailorder Makeover on Fine Living
- Material Girls on DIY
- Melody Ranch Theatre on TNN
- Move it Outside on DIY
- Naomi's Country Stars on the Food Network
- Nick America on Nickelodeon
- Non-Stop Slots on the Travel Channel
- Pickin' at the Paradise on TNN
- Randy Travis Happy Trails on TNN
- Ready for the Road on TNN
- Remodeling and Decorating Today on TNN
- Robot Rivals on DIY
- Rollerjam on TNN
- Rollerjam Reborn on TNN
- Score on MTV
- Shadetree Mechanic on TNN
- Tag Team on the Game Show Network
- Tattoo Crazy on the Travel Channel
- Tough Car Challenge on TNN
- Travel Quest on A&E
- US Poker Championship on the Travel Channel and ESPN
- Ultimate Workshop II on DIY
- Vegas Deals Revealed on the Travel Channel
- Weekend Mechanic on DIY
- The Whole Picture on DIY
- Wish You Were Here on TNN
- World Series of Poker on the Discovery Channel
- The World's Largest Hotel on the Discovery Channel
- Your Home Studio on TNN
