= MasterChef Canada season 1 =

Season of television series

MasterChef Canada
- Season 1
- No. of episodes: 15

Release
- Original network: CTV
- Original release: 20 January – 28 April 2014

Season chronology
- Next → Season 2

The first and inaugural season of the Canadian competitive reality television series MasterChef Canada, featuring judges Michael Bonacini, Alvin Leung and Claudio Aprile, debuted on CTV on 20 January 2014, and concluded on 28 April 2014, with Chinese-Canadian McMaster University chemical engineering graduate Eric Chong named the winner. CTV ordered the series in June 2013. open casting call audition tryouts were held in August 2013. Filming commenced in early September 2013 and wrapped up in late November 2013. At the age of 21, Chong was the youngest winner of MasterChef Canada at the time of his victory, a record he held until Beccy Stables became the winner of the show's fifth season at age 19.

After his victory, Chong extensively traveled across East Asia up with Leung after graduating with his degree and they opened up the restaurant Rebel and Demon "R&D", located in Spadina, Toronto, specializing in East Asian cuisine. This restaurant was promotionally featured in the restaurant takeover team challenge episode in the third season, which he guest-starred in. Chong also guest starred in an episode of the second and fifth seasons, and appeared in the show's MasterChef Canada: All-Star Family Edition 2016 holiday special, where his group was eliminated at the end of the first round.

Contestant Dora Cote, who came in 11th place, later returned to compete in MasterChef Canada: Back to Win, where she came in 12th.

== Top 16 ==
Contestant	Age	Hometown	Occupation	Status
Eric Chong	21	Oakville, Ontario	Chemical engineer	Winner 28 April
Marida Mohammed	31	Toronto, Ontario	Stay-at-home mom	Runner-Up 28 April
Kaila Klassen	24	West Kelowna, British Columbia	Realtor	Eliminated 21 April
Tammara Behl	38	Calgary, Alberta	Teacher	Eliminated 21 April
Mike Green	30	Winnipeg, Manitoba	Journalist	Eliminated 14 April
Pino DiCerbo	36	Mississauga, Ontario	Stay-at-home dad	Eliminated 7 April
Julie Miguel	30	Woodbridge, Ontario	Bankruptcy analyst	Eliminated 31 March
Danielle Cardozo	28	Fernie, British Columbia	Employment development officer	Eliminated 24 March
Carly Tennant	30	Vancouver, British Columbia	Retail clothing store owner	Eliminated 17 March
Dale Kuda	26	Toronto, Ontario	Household manager	Eliminated 10 March
Dora Cote	37	Edmonton, Alberta	Plumber	Eliminated 3 March
Josh Gale	26	Vancouver, British Columbia	IT sales	Eliminated 24 February
Danny Raposo	36	Brampton, Ontario	Construction worker	Eliminated 17 February
Brooke Feldman	32	Toronto, Ontario	Make-up artist	Eliminated 10 February
Meghan Toth	30	St. Catharines, Ontario	Stay-at-home mom	Eliminated 3 February
Ben Miner	33	Toronto, Ontario	Comedian	Eliminated 3 February

== Elimination table ==
Place	Contestant	Episode																		
Place	Contestant	3		4	5		6	7		8	9		10	11		12	13	14		15
1	Eric	HIGH	IN	LOW	IN	LOW	NPT	WIN	IMM	WIN	IN	WIN	WPT	HIGH	IN	LOW	LOW	LOW	WIN	WINNER
2	Marida	WIN	IMM	WIN	IN	IN	WIN	HIGH	IN	NPT	HIGH	LOW	WIN	IN	LOW	WPT	WIN	HIGH	IN	RUNNER-UP
3	Kaila	IN	IN	WPT	WIN	IMM	PT	IN	WIN	LOW	HIGH	IN	LOW	IN	IN	WIN	WPT	WIN	ELIM	
4	Tammara	IN	IN	WIN	IN	IN	WIN	IN	IN	WIN	HIGH	WIN	WIN	HIGH	WIN	WIN	WIN	ELIM		
5	Mike	IN	IN	LOW	HIGH	IN	WIN	IN	LOW	WIN	IN	IN	WIN	WIN	IMM	WIN	ELIM			
6	Pino	IN	WIN	WIN	IN	LOW	NPT	HIGH	WIN	WIN	IN	LOW	WIN	IN	WIN	ELIM				
7	Julie	IN	IN	WIN	IN	IN	WIN	IN	IN	PT	IN	IN	LOW	IN	ELIM					
8	Danielle	IN	IN	WIN	IN	WIN	WPT	IN	IN	WPT	WIN	IMM	ELIM							
9	Carly	HIGH	IN	WIN	IN	IN	WIN	IN	IN	WIN	IN	ELIM								
10	Dale	IN	WIN	NPT	HIGH	IN	LOW	IN	LOW	ELIM										
11	Dora	IN	IN	WIN	IN	WIN	WIN	IN	ELIM											
12	Josh	IN	IN	PT	HIGH	IN	ELIM													
13	Danny	IN	LOW	NPT	IN	ELIM														
14	Brooke	IN	IMM	ELIM																
15-16	Meghan	IN	ELIM																	
15-16	Ben	IN	ELIM																	

(WINNER) This cook won the competition.
(RUNNER-UP) This cook finished in second place.
(WIN) The cook won the individual challenge (Mystery Box Challenge or Elimination Test).
(WIN) The cook was on the winning team in the Team Challenge and was directly advanced to the next round.
(HIGH) The cook was one of the top entries in the individual challenge, but did not win, or received considerable praise during an Elimination Challenge.
(PT) The cook was on the losing team in the Team Challenge, but won the Pressure Test.
(IN) The cook was not selected as a top entry or bottom entry in an individual challenge.
(DNP) The chef was injured or sick and couldn´t participate in the challenge.
(IN) The cook was not selected as a top entry or bottom entry in a team challenge.
(IMM) The cook did not have to compete in that round of the competition and was safe from elimination.
(IMM) The cook was selected by Mystery Box Challenge winner and did not have to compete in the Elimination Test.
(PT) The cook was on the losing team in the Team Challenge, competed in the Pressure Test, and advanced.
(NPT) The cook was on the losing team in the Team Challenge, but was exempted from the Pressure Test.
(LOW) The cook was one of the bottom entries in an individual elimination challenge or Pressure Test and they advanced.
(LOW) The cook was one of the bottom entries in a team challenge and they advanced.
(ELIM) The cook was eliminated from MasterChef.

== Episodes ==
No. overall	No. in season	Title	Original release date	Prod. code	CAN viewers (millions)	Rank (week)
1	1	"White is the New Black"	20 January 2014	101	1.777	11
Fifty home cooks selected from across Canada were given one hour to prepare their signature dish for judges Michael Bonacini, Alvin Leung and Claudio Aprile; each required at least two "yes" votes in order to obtain a white apron and advance to the next round. This episode featured the auditions of Tammara, Eric, Marida, Kaila, Carly and Dora, who won their aprons, as well as those of Billie-Jo, Carmella and Marida's twin sister Narida, who were sent home.
2	2	"Chicken Little"	27 January 2014	102	1.653	14
In the second round the remaining home cooks, including Danny and Meghan who rounded out the Top 26, were given 60 minutes to make a chicken dish using only one pan, one burner, and one chicken, as well as a limited pantry of produce; only 16 would keep their aprons. At the end of the challenge all of the dishes were inspected; Mike, Marida, Julie, Meghan and Josh were called forward and advanced into the Top 16. Two more groups were then called forward. The group consisting of Tammara, Eric, Pino, Ben, Danielle, Carly and Brooke advanced, while group consisting of Rob, Sarah, JP, Allison, Natalia and Jordan was eliminated. The remaining eight home cooks' dishes were tasted again; of these, Dale, Kaila, Danny and Dora advanced while John, Bubba, Sparkle and Evan were eliminated, finalizing the Top 16.
3	3	"First Kick at the Box"	3 February 2014	103	1.824	10
Mystery Box 1: In the first individual challenge, the Top 16 were given a mystery box featuring a variety of sweet and savory ingredients: pork loin, crunchy and smooth peanut butter, bananas, semisweet chocolate, honey, and chorizo. Carly, Eric, and Marida were the top three, and Marida's pork and noodle stir-fry with peanut vinaigrette was the winning dish. Elimination Test 1: Marida was presented with three ingredients representing the Canadian land, air, and sea, and she selected the smelt (over the venison and duck) for the other home cooks to work with. She was also allowed to save one person from elimination and she chose Brooke. Pino's deep-fried smelts with tagliatelle soup and Dale's gougères were the best and they automatically became team captains in the next challenge. Eric's smelt three ways and Tamara's Vietnamese-style salad rolls were also praised. Danny blitzed the smelts for his croquettes, removing all the flavor of the fish, Meghan's onion and mushroom quiche had a poor taste and Ben's fishcakes were bland. The judges eliminated Ben followed by Meghan, marking the first double elimination in MasterChef Canada history.
4	4	"The Puck Drops Here"	10 February 2014	104	1.654	7
Team Challenge 1: For the first team challenge, the home cooks visited the Air Canada Centre (now Scotiabank Arena, home to the NHL's Toronto Maple Leafs). They had one and a half hours to prepare and serve a two-course meal consisting of a fish entree with two sides and a pasta dish for Maple Leafs players, their families, and alumni. Pino chose Marida, Julie, Carly, Tammara, Dora and Danielle, forming the Blue Team. Dale chose Eric, Brooke, Mike, Josh and was left with Kaila, forming the White Team. Danny was excused due to illness and thus had to cook in the pressure test. The Blue Team's pasta fagioli and poached halibut with sweet potatoes defeated the White Team's penne and baked trout with asparagus, 26 votes to 11. Pressure Test 1: Before the pressure test began, Dale and the White Team argued over his alleged lack of leadership. Nonetheless, he chose to save himself and Danny from elimination, even though the latter didn't participate in the previous challenge. The other five were then given 45 minutes to make raviolo al uovo with a sage butter sauce. Mike's pasta was hard and undercooked. Brooke's pasta was also underdone and she forgot to fry the sage leaf. In a close decision, Brooke was eliminated.
5	5	"Where's the Beef"	17 February 2014	105	1.999	9
Mystery Box 2: The mystery box contained a meat grinder. The home cooks had to make a burger using at least one of the exotic meats presented. Near the end of the challenge, Eric severely cut his hand and was forced to sit out, leaving him with no dish to present. Dale, Kaila, Josh and Mike made the four best dishes, and Kaila's "Oinkin' Duck" burger was the best dish. Elimination Test 2: Kaila was presented with three Canadian ingredients, each paired with a different flavor of Alexander Keith's Hop Ale, and she selected apples (over bacon and maple syrup). She also chose to force Eric and Josh to make a dessert. Dora's and Danielle's pork chops were the best and they became team captains. Pino's pork with lentils and apple compote was compared to prison food, Eric put his apple pie in the oven late and the pastry was raw, and Danny's spicy pork medallions didn't taste of apple or beer. Danny's dish was judged to be the worst and he was eliminated.
6	6	"Edible Art"	24 February 2014	106	1.618	20
Team Challenge 2: The home cooks were taken to Toronto's Distillery District. They were tasked with preparing 350 servings of canapés for art patrons at Thomson Landry Gallery. Dora chose Carly, Mike, Marida, Julie and Tammara forming the Red Team, while Danielle chose Dale, Josh, Eric, Kaila and was left with Pino forming the Blue Team. The Red Team won and the Blue Team faced the pressure test. Pressure Test 2: The Red Team chose to save Eric and Pino from the pressure test. Dale, Josh, Kaila and Danielle had 90 minutes to bake a cheesecake, with the best being featured in a Philadelphia cream cheese magazine. Danielle's limoncello Key lime cheesecake was named the best while Kaila's chocolate caramel pecan cheesecake tasted good but was criticized for not honoring the main ingredient, cheese. Dale's berry cheesecake sank during the baking process and the judges felt he played it safe. However, Josh had trouble removing his tropical passion fruit cheesecake from the cake pan, resulting in cracks and damaged edges. Ultimately, he was eliminated.
7	7	"Brains Before Beauty"	3 March 2014	107	1.853	16
Mystery Box 3: The home cooks had to make a dish representing their childhood. The top three were Pino, Marida and Eric, and Eric's Chinese barbeque pork with soup noodles was the best. Elimination Test 3: Eric was presented with ten different cuts of beef from an Alberta cow, ranging from premium steaks to offal, and he was allowed to decide which cut of meat the others would have to cook. Targeting Kaila, he assigned the brain to her, liver to Mike, oxtail to Pino, sweetbread to Carly, kidney to Marida, cheek to Dora, tongue to Danielle, tomahawk steak to Dale, bone marrow to Tammara and flank steak to Julie. Kaila's crispy brain with polenta and Pino's Jamaican oxtail stew were the best. Dale's tomahawk steak was raw and deemed uninspiring, while Mike's liver oxidized and Claudio refused to taste it. However, Dora's beef cheek stew looked and tasted poorly and she was eliminated.
8	8	"Major Steaks"	10 March 2014	108	1.885	12
Team Challenge 3: The Top 10 were taken to CFB Trenton where they had to prepare and serve a ribeye steak with two sides for 151 members of the Canadian Forces. Kaila chose Danielle, Dale, Julie and Marida forming the Red Team. Pino selected Eric, Mike, Tammara and was left with Carly forming the Blue Team. The Red Team ran out of Brussels sprouts and potatoes during service, and the Blue Team won with 107 out of 151 votes. Pressure Test 3: The Red Team picked Marida to avoid the pressure test. The other four team members were challenged to make salmon wellington, a twist on the classic beef Wellington. Danielle's salmon wellington was the best while Julie's was near-perfect. Dale and Kaila's Wellington went into the oven late and they were raw. In a close decision, Dale was eliminated.
9	9	"Great Canadian Bake-Off"	17 March 2014	109	1.784	11
Mystery Box 4: The mystery box featured ingredients from the judges' restaurants. Tammara, Danielle, Marida and Kaila were the top four, and Danielle's brown butter-basted monkfish with sea urchin velouté was the winning dish. Elimination Test 4: Danielle was presented with three classic regional Canadian desserts, one of which the other eight home cooks had to reinvent. Targeting Marida and Kaila, Danielle selected the Nanaimo bar over the butter tart and blueberry grunt. Tammara's pierogis and Eric's chocolate caramel tart were the top two. Pino's tart looked and tasted poorly and Marida's truffles were dry and lacked sweetness. However, Carly's white chocolate cups received the worst review and she was eliminated.
10	10	"Meals on Wheels"	24 March 2014	110	1.833	11
Team Challenge 4: The home cooks visited Toronto's Nathan Phillips Square, where they were tasked with running food trucks, Mexicana and Italiano. Tammara chose Mexicana and Eric was left with Italiano. At first Tammara, Marida, Mike and Julie formed the Blue Team while Eric, Pino, Danielle and Kaila formed the Red Team, but the judges gave Tammara the advantage of trading a member, choosing to trade Pino for Julie. They had two hours to cook and serve a dish with the assigned style, and the Blue Team won by a narrow margin of 15 dollars. Pressure Test 4: The four members of the Red Team faced the pressure test, in which they had 80 minutes to make a baked Alaska. Eric was praised for his dessert, and while Julie was criticized for having raw flour in her sponge cake, they were both saved. Danielle and Kaila were the bottom two, and Danielle was eliminated.
11	11	"Claws Out"	31 March 2014	111	1.777	15
Mystery Box 5: The mystery boxes were empty. Instead, the home cooks were presented with a large tank containing lobsters and were given 45 minutes to make a lobster dish. Mike, Tammara and Eric were the top three and Mike's lobster roll was the winning dish. Elimination Test 5: The six remaining home cooks were split into pairs and tasked with recreating the judges' Chinese dim sum platter, and Mike was allowed to choose the pairs. He paired Tammara and Pino, Julie and Marida, and Kaila and Eric. This was a tag team challenge: one chef at a time could cook while one gave orders with each member switching in a while. Tammara and Pino's platter was the best. Eric and Kaila's spring rolls were perfectly cooked while their shrimp dumplings were poorly made and bland. Julie and Marida's spring rolls were burnt and greasy and they forgot their shrimp dumplings. Julie was ultimately eliminated.
12	12	"Line of Fire"	7 April 2014	112	1.820	13
Team Challenge 5: In the series' first restaurant takeover, the home cooks were taken to Claudio's restaurant, Origin North. The Red Team consisted of Tammara, Kaila and Mike while the Blue Team consisted of Pino, Marida and Eric. The teams were tasked with serving two appetizers: beet salad with yogurt and picked onion, and pan-seared scallops with roe and squid-ink aioli, and two entrees: tea-smoked venison with chanterelle mushrooms and sweet potato, and pan-roasted halibut with Thai coconut broth to 44 guests. The judges determined the Blue Team to have the worst performance and subjected them to the pressure test. Pressure Test 5: In the pressure test, Pino, Marida and Eric had one hour to make one dozen donuts featuring at least three different types. Marida's donuts were deemed the best, while Eric made eight different flavors with varying degrees of success. Pino's donuts were uneven in size and too doughy, and he was eliminated.
13	13	"Family Style"	14 April 2014	113	1.842	7
Team Challenge 6: The five remaining home cooks were reunited with their families. For their final team challenge, they were then given 90 minutes to create a family style meal, consisting of an entrée and two sides, for a combined table of family members and judges. Marida was allowed to select one or two members for her team, Marida chose only Tammara, forming the Red Team, leaving Eric, Kaila, and Mike to form the Blue Team. Marida and Tammara were judged to have done the best in the challenge and they won, sending the Blue Team to the pressure test. Pressure Test 6: Eric, Kaila, and Mike faced off in the pressure test, in which they had 45 minutes to make a classic bistro dish: Steak frites with Béarnaise sauce. Kaila had the worst fries but her steak was well-cooked and her Béarnaise was deemed sufficiently good; subsequently, she was sent to safety first. It came down to Eric, whose sauce was overly thick, and Mike, whose steak was undercooked, and the latter was sent home for having the bigger flaw in his dish.
14	14	"Not Your Average Joe"	21 April 2014	114	1.936	8
Mystery Box 6: MasterChef U.S. judge Joe Bastianich assembled the mystery box with his favorite Italian ingredients, which included a white wine from his vineyard in northern Italy. The judges revealed that the person with the worst dish would be eliminated. Kaila won with her stuffed veal loin, while Eric and Tammara were the bottom two. The judges liked Eric's fettucine but felt it was underwhelming. Tammara's veal medallion was nicely cooked but the dish did not have enough acidity, and the judges felt that Tammara offered two dishes instead of one. Ultimately, Tamara was eliminated. Elimination Test 6: In the last elimination challenge, Eric, Marida and Kaila had one hour to make a dish using one of three seafood items: Kaila chose the scallops and Marida picked the razor clams, leaving Eric with the Dungeness crab. Eric stood out with his dish. Marida's clams were perfectly cooked, but Michael felt there was too much garnish. The judges liked the various components of Kaila's dish, but her scallops were slightly overcooked, and she was eliminated. Thus, Eric and Marida became the finalists.
15	15	"And Then There Were 2"	28 April 2014	115	2.216	7
Eric and Marida were tasked with making a three-course meal and had one hour to prepare each course. For the appetizer, Marida made a pumpkin callaloo soup with coconut lime crème fraîche, crispy pig tail and lime pepper sauce, while Eric served crispy pork belly with vegetable dumplings and wasabi mayonnaise. For the entrée, Eric made egg noodles with poached lobster and Marida presented a taro-leaf steamed black cod with pigeon pea purée, mango chutney and cucumber. For dessert, Marida served apple crumble with a coconut ice cream and rum sauce, while Eric presented an Asian take on a banana split, composed of tempura-fried bananas with red bean and green tea ice cream. Eric was declared the winner, receiving $100,000 and the MasterChef Canada title.
