= Divine Canine =

Divine Canine (also known as Divine Canine: With the Monks of New Skete) is a television series on Animal Planet. The show premiered on April 16, 2007.

The show examines the Monks of New Skete, an order of Orthodox Christian monks who train dogs. The monks, located in upstate New York, are known for their ability to train dysfunctional dogs as well as being breeders of German Shepherd puppies.

The show was produced by RIVR Media. Animal Planet ordered sixteen half-hour shows for the initial run.

Season one episodes along with original air dates:

4/16/2007: Un-Spoiling Stella
4/30/2007: Hoisting Hugo
4/30/2007: Teaching Tessie
5/7/2007: Heeling Holly
5/28/2007: Harnessing Harley
6/4/2007: Calming Chico
6/15/2007: Balancing Boomer
6/22/2007: Semi-Sweet Puppy

== Reception ==
Common Sense Media rated the show 3 out of 5 stars.
