= Kitchen Accomplished =

- Also known as: Kitchen Cops
- Genre: Reality television
- Starring: Cat Cora; Wolfgang Schaber; Peter Marr
- Country of origin: United States
- Original language: English
- No. of seasons: 1
- No. of episodes: 13

Production
- Production company: RIVR Media

Original release
- Network: Food Network
- Release: 4 September – 27 November 2004

Kitchen Accomplished is an American reality television series that aired on the Food Network in 2004.

Homeowners would send in videos of their kitchens that need renovating and the Food Network executives would choose one. It is then up to the series' team of chef Cat Cora, design expert Wolfgang Schaber and contractor Peter Marr to remodel the chosen kitchen in three days' time with cameras covering it. During the process of the remodel, the hosts would offer tips for designing your kitchen and Cat would show the recipients of the remodel some recipes that you would get to add to your collection. Finally, the homeowners would be blindfolded with kitchen towels for the big reveal of the remodeling job- of which, all were pleased with the end results.

As of December 2004, the show is no longer in production. It was produced by RIVR Media.
