= Eric Chong =

Canadian chef (born 1991)

- Born: 27 December 1991 (age 34)
- Education: McMaster University
- Occupations: Cook; Restaurateur; Engineer (former)
- Known for: Masterchef Canada

Eric Chong (born 27 December 1991) is a Canadian chef, former engineer, and a restaurateur who was the winner of the first season of MasterChef Canada, winning at age 21.

== Career ==
He obtained a degree in chemical engineering from McMaster University and started working in the field, but quit when he heard the casting call for MasterChef Canada. After winning the competition, he received an offer from Alvin Leung, one of the judges, to train with him and open a restaurant together. Leung noted similarities between himself and Chong, such as their background in engineering and their families' initial disapproval of their choice of trade. They opened R&D in Toronto in 2015, serving Asian fusion dishes such as lobster chow mein, inspired by his winning dish in the final round of MasterChef Canada. Chong later made a cameo on MasterChef Canada season 3, where the two teams took over R&D's kitchen serving various alumni of the show and were judged on their performance. He won season 1

In 2025, Eric Chong's restaurant aKin in Toronto, Canada was awarded a prestigious Michelin Star. Eric Chong also won the Michelin Young Chef award.
