= New Skete (New York) =

Eastern Orthodox monasteries in Cambridge, New York

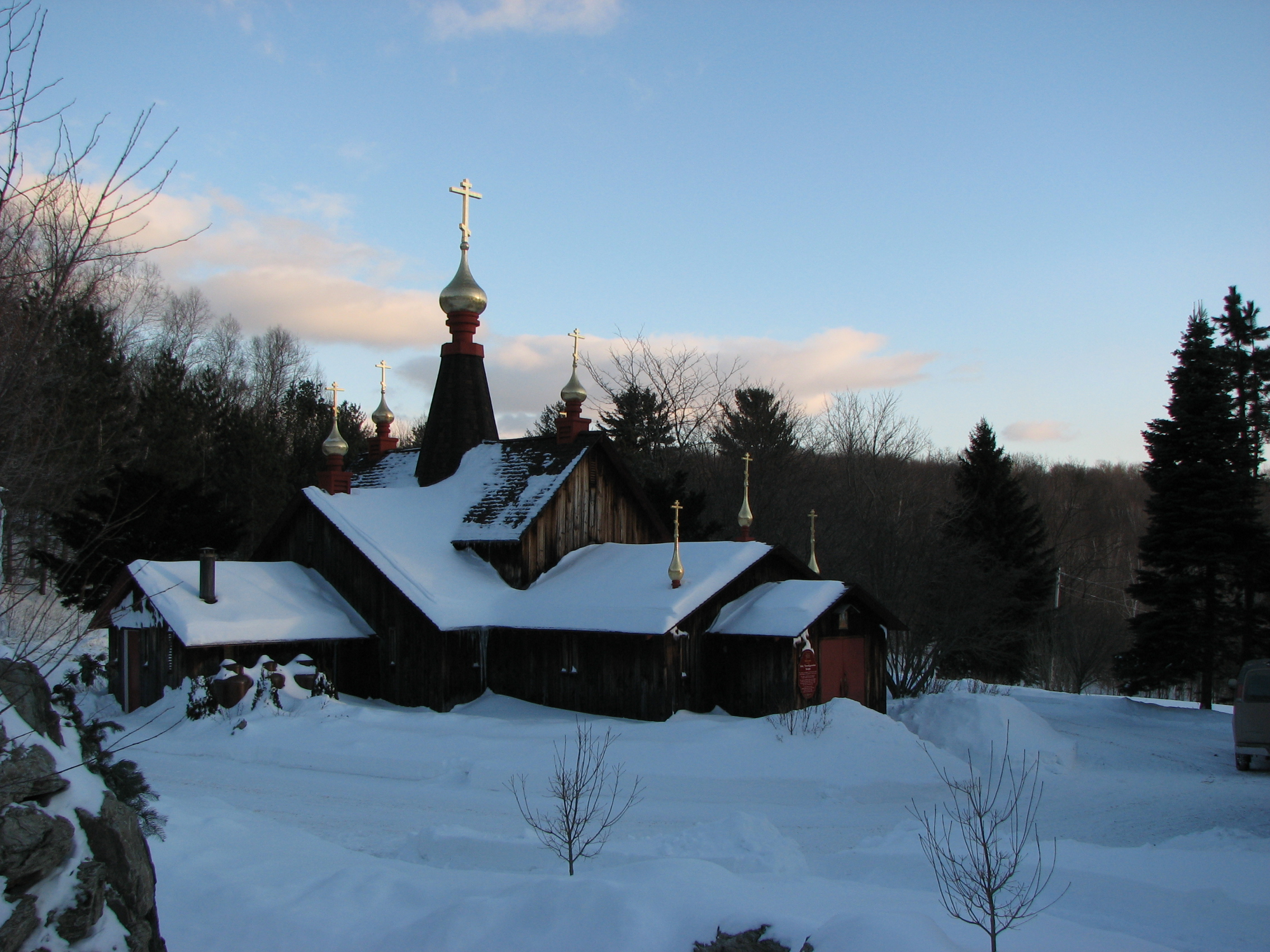
New Skete Monastery in the snow

New Skete is the collective term for two Orthodox Christian monastic communities in Cambridge, New York (geographically in the town of White Creek):

- The Monks of New Skete, a men's monastery founded in 1966, and
- the Nuns of New Skete, a women's monastery founded in 1969.

The communities are under the omophorion of the Metropolitan of the Orthodox Church in America. The monks are best known for their breeding of German Shepherds and the training of all dog breeds in basic obedience. The monks have written several dog-training manuals, including The Art of Raising a Puppy and How to Be Your Dog's Best Friend: The Classic Training Manual for Dog Owners. The nuns are best known for baking gourmet cheesecakes, which they sell on the internet and in their gift shop.

These two communities are unique in that they have instituted wide-ranging reforms to the divine office and eucharistic liturgies of the Eastern Orthodox Church, aimed at rendering the services more comprehensible. They are open to ecumenical contacts with other Christian groups. The nave of their Holy Wisdom Temple features iconographic portraits of Orthodox saints as well as prominent non-Orthodox people, such as Pope John XXIII, Archbishop Michael Ramsey, and Mother Teresa of Calcutta, The communities also celebrate the feast of the Roman Catholic saint Francis of Assisi.

They have been criticized by Orthodox conservatives and traditionalists, but the monks and nuns have strongly defended their renewal of liturgy and monastic life. They believe this is a necessity if Orthodox monasticism is to be more than "museum-keeping" in the modern world. The monastery has a chapel community as well as a fellowship of lay people, known as Companions, who seek to be formally connected with New Skete in order to deepen their spiritual lives. Through their connection with New Skete, they work to incorporate monastic values that help them live out the call of the Gospel in a lay setting at the same time as they help to support New Skete's mission. This enrichment program serves those who seek to integrate prayer and spirituality in their daily activities and enhances their commitment to their own Christian life.

In April 2007, the television show Divine Canine premiered on the cable television channel Animal Planet. The show featured the dog training program of the monks of New Skete.

== Monks of New Skete ==
The Monks of New Skete believe that an authentic and vibrant monasticism is an essential ingredient to healthy Church life. The monastic vocation is contemplative and apostolic, challenging both the Church and the world at large to fuller life. They note that monasticism has always incarnated itself within a particular cultural context.

Working to live as monks in the modern world, they have developed a daily schedule that integrates liturgical and personal prayer, work, study, and prudent openness to the world. Anchored in a daily cycle of matins and vespers (with Divine Liturgy on Sundays and feast days), they try to be available to all who come to the monastery, in a manner in keeping with their vocation. Many people visit the monastery each year, either to make retreats, attend services, visit the gift shop and grounds, or as dog customers.

== Nuns of New Skete ==
The Nuns of New Skete, originally a group of Poor Clares, moved from Indiana in 1969 to establish their monastery near the monks' monastery. They support themselves by baking New York-style gourmet cheesecakes for sale in their gift shop and on their website.

== Publications on religion and spirituality ==
- In the Spirit of Happiness, The Monks of New Skete, Rider, 1999, ISBN 0-7126-0686-6
- Rise Up with a Listening Heart, The Monks of New Skete, Yorkville Press, 2004, ISBN 0-9729427-6-9

== Publications on raising and training dogs ==
- How to Be Your Dog's Best Friend: The Classic Training Manual for Dog Owners (Revised & Updated Edition), The Monks of New Skete, Little, Brown and Company, September, 2002, ISBN 0-316-61000-3
- The Art of Raising a Puppy, The Monks of New Skete, Little, Brown and Company, March 20, 1991, ISBN 0-316-57839-8
- Divine Canine: The Monks' Way to a Happy, Obedient Dog, The Monks of New Skete, Hyperion, September 18, 2007, ISBN 1-4013-0925-9
- I & Dog, The Monks of New Skete, John Sann, and Monique Stauder (Photographer), Yorkville Press, November 3, 2003, ISBN 0-9729427-3-4
- Bless the Dogs, The Monks of New Skete, Vincent Remini (photographer), Hachette, 2013
- Let Dogs Be Dogs, The Monks of New Skete and Marc Goldberg, Little, Brown, and Company, 2017
