= The Muppets Kitchen with Cat Cora =

Cooking and comedy web series

- Genre: Comedy
- Language: English

Cast and voices
- Hosted by: Cat Cora; The Muppets

Publication
- No. of episodes: 6
- Original release: September 13 – December 17, 2010
- Provider: DisneyGo

The Muppets Kitchen with Cat Cora is a cooking and comedy web series that starred chef Cat Cora and The Muppets, released in 2010.

== Plot ==
This web series features Cat Cora making some dishes with her Muppet sidekick Angelo (performed by Tyler Bunch with the hands puppeteered by Paul McGinnis). Angelo was an Italian chef who was taught all about cooking by The Swedish Chef. Pepe the King Prawn would always close out the show.

== Episodes ==
1. Birthday Cat-Astrophe (September 13, 2010) – While Cat Cora is locked in the pantry, Angelo, Fozzie Bear, and Gonzo make some watermelon gazpacho for Cat's birthday surprise.
2. Breakfast Isn't Just for Breakfast Anymore (October 8, 2010) – Much to the chagrin of the Early Bird, Angelo calls Cat Cora into the kitchen at 3:00 in the morning to make a breakfast smoothie and pancakes.
3. Game Day (October 8, 2010) – Cat Cora and Angelo prepare a California 7-layer dip and a Cheese-steak Sami with provolone sauce for the "Muppet Y Games" while Kermit the Frog reports on it.
4. Movie Night (November 24, 2010) – Cat Cora shows Angelo and a hungry rat on how to make a maple popcorn trail mix to prepare for movie night.
5. World's Biggest Sandwich (December 17, 2010) – In a spoof of The Towering Inferno, Angelo plans to make the world's biggest sandwich which goes horribly wrong.
6. Slumber Party (December 17, 2010) – When Cat Cora tells Angelo that she is making Pigs in a Blanket, Angelo brings Andy and Randy Pig over for a slumber party.

== Cast ==
- Cat Cora – Herself

=== Muppet performers ===
- Steve Whitmire – Kermit the Frog, Beaker, Foo-Foo, The Muppet Newsman, Andy Pig
- Eric Jacobson – Miss Piggy, Fozzie Bear
- Dave Goelz – Gonzo, Dr. Bunsen Honeydew, Beauregard, Randy Pig
- Bill Barretta – Rowlf the Dog, Pepe the King Prawn
- Tyler Bunch – Angelo
- Alice Dinnean – Yolanda Rat
- Paul McGinnis – Hands of Angelo

== Promotion ==
In September 2010, Cat Cora, alongside Fozzie Bear and Angelo appeared on the American CBS television series, The Early Show to make on a burger recipe together.

== Awards and Nominations ==
In 2011 the show was nominated for a Webby Award for Online Film & Video Comedy: Longform.
