= AKin (restaurant) =

Restaurant in Toronto, Ontario, Canada

aKin
- Interactive map of aKin

Restaurant information
- Established: November 30, 2024
- Owners: Eric Chong; Alvin Leung
- Head chef: Eric Chong; Alvin Leung
- Pastry chef: Flora Zhang
- Food type: Asian Fusion; Chinese
- Rating: (Michelin Guide)
- Location: 51 Colborne St, Toronto, Ontario, M5E 1E3, Canada
- Coordinates: 43°38′56.4″N 79°22′29.3″W
- Seating capacity: 28
- Website: www.akintoronto.com

aKin is a Michelin-starred Chinese and Asian Fusion restaurant in downtown Toronto, Ontario, Canada.

== History ==
The restaurant was opened by chefs Eric Chong and Alvin Leung in November 2024, the second restaurant opened by the pair, after Michelin Bib Gourmand restaurant R&D. Leung, who holds Michelin stars for his Hong Kong restaurant Bo Innovation, met Chong when judging MasterChef Canada, where the latter became the show's first winner.

The business's name, aKin, includes multiple layers of reference, including to how Chong and Leung are akin (of similar nature) - both being of Chinese-Canadian background and having trained as professional engineers before starting careers in cooking, as well as referencing Chong's grandfather - named Kin - who inspired his love of cooking.

Chong cited the arrival of the Michelin Guide in 2022 to Toronto as inspiration to open a fine dining tasting menu focused restaurant, with the goal of winning a star.

While Chong and Leung co-own the restaurant, the former serves as the primary chef de cuisine and manages day-to-day operations of the restaurant.

== Concept ==
aKin serves a 10 to 12 course blind tasting menu, which changes every few months to focus on a different concept related to "reinterpreting and elevating" Asian cuisine. The restaurant uses hand-made custom dishware, to ensure the plates compliment the dishes that are served on them.

In spring 2025, the restaurant served a menu focused on twists related to dim sum. In fall 2025, the restaurant began offering a tasting menu based on East and Southeast Asian street food, including fine dining takes on items like Hainan chicken rice, takoyaki, tom yum, and Vietnamese coffee. In spring 2026, the restaurant's tasting menu was centred around dishes popularized by Chinese takeout.

Three of the restaurant's tasting menu courses are sweet-oriented and crafted by pastry chef Flora Zhang - a pre-dessert, dessert course, and petit fours.

The restaurant offers patrons the option of pairing the meal with either wine or cocktails. The cocktail list is crafted with Asian-influenced ingredients and are designed to pair with certain courses, changing with each new food menu concept.

According to Chong, dishes served at the restaurant are designed to be relatable to guests and, upon recommendation of Leung, to be photogenic to ensure that patrons are able to share the photos of their meal.

The restaurant seats 28, including 4 seats at the chef's counter. The chef's counter experience differs from the regular menu and charges a higher price point, offering direct interaction with the chefs and upgraded versions of courses such as the addition of Japanese A5 Wagyu.

== Recognition ==
The restaurant received a Michelin star in Toronto's 2025 edition of the Michelin Guide, the only new restaurant to receive a star in that year's guide. Michelin highlighted the restaurant's dishes as "refined excellence", praising Chong for basing the tasting menu off his heritage and personal experiences. Chong was also awarded Michelin's 'Young Chef Award' for the Toronto region at that year's ceremony for aKin.

In 2025, aKin was ranked #3 on Air Canada's annual best new restaurants in Canada list.

=== Canada's 100 Best Restaurants Ranking ===
The restaurant debuted on Canada's 100 Best Restaurants list in its 2026 edition.

aKin
Year	Rank	Change
2026	27	new

== See also ==
- List of Michelin-starred restaurants in Toronto
- List of Chinese restaurants
