= Shadetree Mechanic =

US television program (1992 - 2000)

Shadetree Mechanic is a television series that was shown in the USA on TNN (now Paramount Network) for a total of 190 half-hour episodes, over eight seasons from October 4, 1992, to May 14, 2000. During each half-hour episode, Dave Bowman and Sam Memmolo demonstrate automotive repair and maintenance tips for backyard mechanics. Shadetree Mechanic was superseded by Crank and Chrome and Two Guys Garage which appear on SPEED TV and now Motorhead Garage on Velocity. During the mid-1990s, Shadetree Mechanic was also broadcast on some PBS television channels.

Shadetree Mechanic was produced by Cinetel Productions.

== See also ==
- Shadetree mechanic
