= Around the World in 80 Plates =

American television series

- Genre: Competition
- Presented by: Cat Cora; Curtis Stone
- Opening theme: Robert ToTeras
- Composer: Robert ToTeras
- Country of origin: United States
- No. of seasons: 1
- No. of episodes: 10

Production
- Executive producers: Dan Cutforth; Jane Lipsitz
- Running time: 44 minutes (excluding commercials)
- Production company: Magical Elves Productions

Original release
- Network: Bravo
- Release: May 9 – July 18, 2012

Around the World in 80 Plates is an American reality competition television series that debuted May 9, 2012, on Bravo. The series follows twelve chefs competing in a culinary race across ten countries in 44 days and is hosted by professional chefs Curtis Stone and Cat Cora.

== Contestants ==
In order of elimination:

- Clara Moore (Hometown: St. Louis, Missouri)
- Sai Pituk (Hometown: El Paso, Texas)
- Keven "Cheven" Lee (Hometown: Chatsworth, California)
- Chaz Brown (Hometown: Voorhees, New Jersey)
- Gary Walker (Hometown: Detroit, Michigan)
- Nick Lacasse (Hometown: Burlington, Vermont)
- Jenna Johansen (Hometown: Boulder, Colorado)
- Nicole Lou (Hometown: San Jose, California)
- John Vermiglio (Hometown: Clinton Township, Michigan )
- Steve "Nookie" Postal (Hometown: Cambridge, Massachusetts)
- Liz Garrett (Hometown: Los Angeles, California) – Runner-up
- Avery Pursell (Hometown: Los Angeles, California) – Winner / Fan Favorite

== Contestant progress ==
Contestant	Episode										
Contestant	1	2	3	4	5	6	7	8	9	10	
Avery	WIN	MVC	WIN	IN (-)	WIN	IN (-)	IN	MVC	IN	MVC	WINNER
Liz	WIN	IN	WIN	MVC	IN	WIN	IN (-)	IN	MVC	IN	RUNNER-UP
Nookie	IN (-)	WIN	MVC	IN	WIN	IN	WIN	IN	IN (-)	OUT	
John	IN	IN	IN	IN	IN (-)	MVC	MVC	IN (-)	OUT		
Nicole	IN (-)	IN (-)	WIN	WIN	MVC	IN	IN	OUT			
Jenna	IN	IN	WIN	WIN	IN (-)	WIN	OUT				
Nick	WIN	IN	IN	IN	WIN	OUT					
Gary	IN	WIN	IN (-)	IN	OUT						
Chaz	MVC	WIN	IN (-)	OUT							
Keven	WIN	WIN	OUT								
Sai	WIN	OUT									
Clara	OUT										

(MVC) The contestant was a member of the winning team in that episode's Take-Over Challenge and was selected as the Most Valuable Chef.
(WIN) The contestant was a member of the winning team in that episode's Take-Over Challenge.
(IN) The contestant was not a member of the winning team, but did not receive any votes for elimination.
[IN (-)] The contestant was not a member of the winning team and received at least one vote for elimination.
(OUT) The contestant was not a member of the winning team, received the most elimination votes and was eliminated.

== Episodes ==
Premiere date	Location	Teams	Exceptional Ingredient Challenge	Take-Over Challenge	Most Valuable Chef	Eliminated	U.S. viewers (millions)
Episode 1: London Calling
May 9, 2012	London, England	Black Avery, Chaz, Keven, Liz, Nick, Sai Red Clara, Gary, Jenna, John, Nicole, Nookie	The teams are given maps of three pubs and must visit each one offering food and drinks. The first team to finish wins.: Reward: Use of potatoes in their dishes; Winners: Red Team	Each team will take over one of the pubs and create two authentic gastro-pub dishes while replicating the three dishes they ate during the pub crawl.: Winners: Black Team	Chaz	Clara	0.79
Episode 2: Forget Paris
May 16, 2012	Lyon, France	Black Avery, Chaz, Gary, Keven, Nookie Red Jenna, John, Liz, Nick, Nicole, Sai	The teams navigate through France and do several sheep-themed challenges. First, two teammates must correctly identify six sheep cheeses. Next, each team must herd four sheep into a pen without touching the animals. The final challenge is to taste wines and match them up to their ingredients.: Reward: Meeting Chef Joseph about typical Lyonnese menu.; Winners: Black Team	Each team will be taking over a restaurant, making four dishes a piece. Both teams must also craft a quenelle to be served.: Winners: Black Team	Avery	Sai	0.64
Episode 3: Something Smells Fishy
May 23, 2012	Barcelona, Spain	Black Avery, Jenna, Liz, Nicole, Nookie Red Chaz, Gary, John, Keven, Nick	The teams sort and prepare three different types of seafood: monkfish, merluza, and sepia. Each type of seafood is worth a different amount of money. By the time the delivery truck arrives, whoever makes the most money wins.: Reward: Use of red prawn in their dishes.; Winners: Red Team	Each team will share a restaurant, each creating a three course seafood menu based on the seafood they prepared in the previous challenge.: Winners: Black Team	Nookie	Keven	0.55
Episode 4: In and Out of Africa
May 30, 2012	Marrakesh, Morocco	White Gary, Chaz, Nick Black Nookie, Avery, John Red Jenna, Liz, Nicole	Find the Ben Boubker spice shop within the Medina. Pour glasses of Mint Tea in the traditional Moroccan style.: Reward: $15,000 and a guide to help them navigate the Medina; Winners: Black Team	Each team will share a restaurant, each creating a tagine in addition to two other dishes.: Winners: Red Team	Liz	Chaz	0.78
Episode 5: Tale of Two Villas
June 6, 2012	Florence, Italy	Black Nick, Nookie, Avery, Nicole Red Jenna, Gary, Liz, John	In Florence, the Course starts with a scavenger hunt where the chefs get firsthand experience on the traditions of the local cuisine.: Reward: $10,000 and cooking lessons from a nonna (grandmother).; Winners: Black Team	With their new knowledge, they head to beautiful villas in the rolling hills of Tuscany to create Tuscan cuisine for the Takeover. One chef causes a disaster in the middle of the night and must confess to his fellow chefs.: Winners: Black Team	Nicole	Gary	0.76
Episode 6: Ciao Down
June 13, 2012	Bologna, Italy	Black Nick, Nookie, Avery, Nicole Red Jenna, Liz, John	The chefs shift gears and head north to Bologna where they tackle the local favorite, tortellini.: Reward: $10,000 and extra hour to cook.; Winners: Red Team	Tempers flare between two chefs over past grievances and one of the contestants is intent on taking a teammate down.: Winners: Red Team	John	Nick	0.70
Episode 7: Thai Breaker
June 20, 2012	Chiang Mai, Thailand	White Avery, Jenna Black John, Nookie Red Liz, Nicole	Find and transport two baskets of coconuts, then grate five pounds worth. Plant 20 rows of rice in a traditional paddy.: Reward:$10,000, plus a double shopping budget and the chance to serve two dishes instead of one; Winners: Black Team	Each team runs a Thai street food cart, with the goal of earning the most money.: Winners: Black Team	John (wins $5000 instead of immunity)	Jenna	0.83
Episode 8: Feeding the Demon
June 27, 2012	Hong Kong, China	Black John, Nookie Red Avery, Liz, Nicole	Retrieve an envelope from a statue of Buddha, then bundle 10 hairy crabs, then fill 7 steamer baskets with dumplings.: Reward: Hour with a local sous chef.; Winners: Black Team	The chefs compete as individuals to cook a five-course meal at a restaurant that offers "X-Treme Chinese Cuisine" for Alvin Leung.	Avery	Nicole	0.83
Episode 9: Cry for Me Argentina
July 11, 2012	Buenos Aires, Argentina	Black John, Liz Red Avery, Nookie	The chefs have to make 80 empanadas to then sell in a local park and earn 150 pesos.: Reward: Roast goat, a local delicacy.; Winners: Red Team	The teams takeover a local parrilla (grill house) and create a menu featuring two appetizers and two meat dishes.: Winners: Red Team	Liz	John	0.76
Episode 10: A Winner Comes Home
July 18, 2012	Colonia del Sacramento, Uruguay	Black Avery, Jenna, Nick Red Liz, Chaz, John	Go to three different shops for ingredients for, and then prepare, a traditional Uruguayan dish of each chef's choice: Reward: The power to eliminate one chef (Nookie); Winners: Avery	Create a three-dish menu inspired by three of the chefs' previous destinations throughout the competition, with the help of two past contestants as sous chefs: Winners: Black / Avery	Avery	Liz	0.83

== International broadcasters ==
- Canada (English) - Food Network
- Canada (French) - Zeste
- Australia - TLC
- Italy - Sky
- Spain - Ten
