= Oliver & Bonacini Restaurants =

Canadian hospitality and entertainment company

- Industry: Hospitality and Entertainment
- Founded: 1993
- Founder: Peter Oliver; Michael Bonacini
- Headquarters: 2323 Yonge Street; Toronto, Ontario, Canada
- Key people: Peter Oliver; Michael Bonacini
- Total assets: Jump, Canoe, Auberge du Pommier, Biff's Bistro, O&B Canteen, Luma, Bannock
- Number of employees: 1,200+ (2013)
- Website: www.oliverbonacini.com

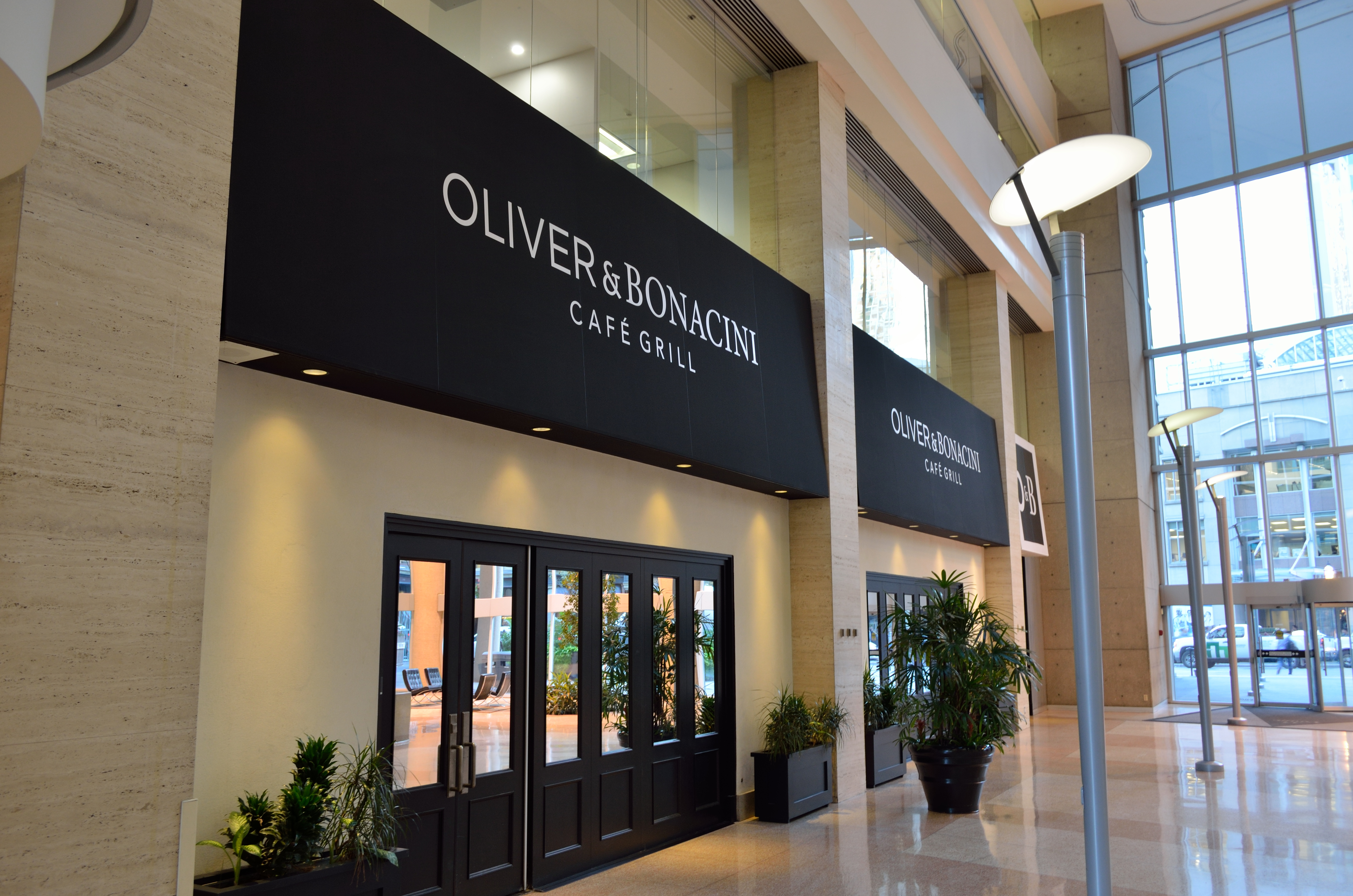
Oliver & Bonacini Café Grill in downtown Toronto

Oliver & Bonacini Restaurants, also known as O&B, is a Canadian hospitality and entertainment company. Based in Toronto, it was founded in 1993 as a partnership between Peter Oliver and Michael Bonacini when they opened their first collaboration—a restaurant named Jump. In the years since, the company has expanded and it currently owns multiple venues and properties in and around Toronto. According to a 2013 The Globe and Mail piece, the company employs a staff of 1,200 people.

== Restaurants ==
=== Jump ===
In operation since 1993, Jump is O&B's flagship restaurant. During that time it became a well known business lunch and dinner spot in Toronto's Financial District.

When it opened at the corner of Bay & Wellington West in late 1993 during the early 1990s recession in Canada, Jump was a major investment by the 44-year-old South African-born former stockbroker and real estate entrepreneur Peter Oliver who had been an active restaurateur in Toronto since 1978 and 33-year-old Michael Bonacini who had made his name as chef at Centro, a popular Franco Prevedello-owned Italian cuisine fine dining spot at Yonge and Eglinton. Furthermore, at the time, Oliver owned successful midtown and uptown Toronto restaurants Oliver's Old Fashioned Bakery and Oliver's Bistro (also in the Yonge and Eglinton area), Bofinger Brasserie (near Yonge & St. Clair), and Auberge du Pommier (in North York near Yonge and York Mills); though he opened Jump as a partnership with Bonacini in 1993, Oliver kept the sole ownership of those four restaurants. Their collaboration occurred almost by chance - Oliver had been setting up the Jump project for years before his chef-to-be fell through and he turned to Bonacini who was the executive chef at Centro, across the street from Oliver's Old Fashioned Bakery.

Located adjacent to the old glass-covered walkway in Commerce Court East, Jump aimed to bring a New York-style restaurant/bar with an offbeat menu and vibe. Launched with a blowout party with 600 guests and a rock band, the restaurant quickly established itself as the favourite of the business lunch crowd.

In February 2013, ahead of its twentieth anniversary, the restaurant closed down for a month in order to undergo a C$1 million upgrade including the installation of audio visual equipment for private business meetings as well as renovation to the dining room, bar, and kitchen.

=== Canoe ===
In 1995, following the quick failure of Chapeau (O&B's first project since Jump took off), the company accepted an offer from the TD Bank Tower landlord about opening a restaurant on the building's 54th floor where a struggling vine bar had been operating up to that point. A new restaurant called Canoe opened on 21 September 1995 and quickly turned into another big winner for O&B, by the late 2000s generating between C$6 and 7 million in revenue annually. In May 2015, nearly 20 years after the restaurant opened its doors, The Globe & Mail's Chris Nuttall-Smith awarded Canoe four stars, calling the restaurant "fresher, more ambitious, better-polished and more committed today to its cool Canadian mission than ever."

=== Auberge du Pommier ===
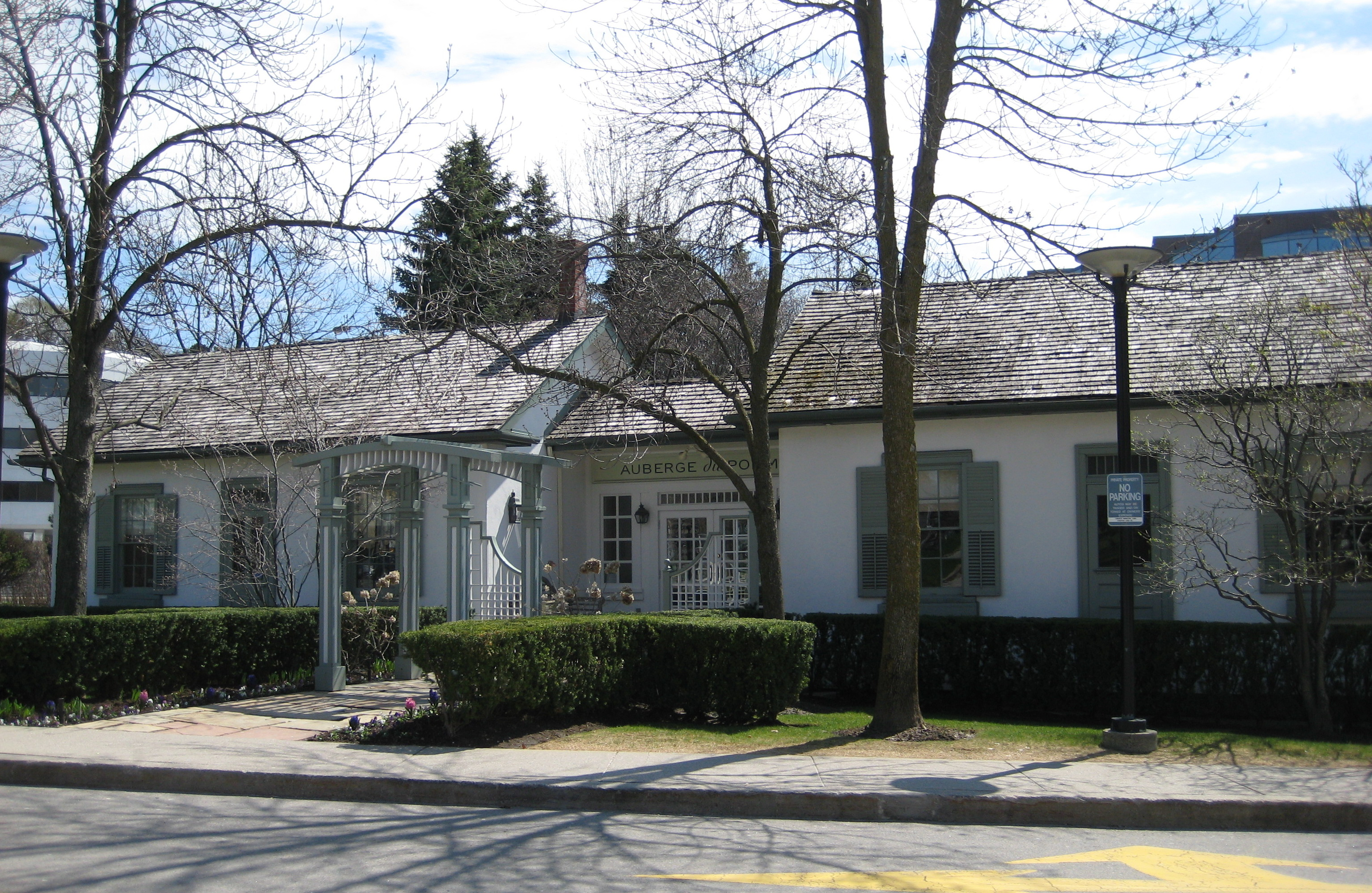
Auberge du Pommier in Toronto's York Mills neighbourhood.

Opened in 1987 in North York's affluent York Mills neighbourhood, under Peter Oliver's sole ownership, the fine dining French cuisine spot Auberge du Pommier operated under his command until 1997 when Oliver's partner in the rising O&B company Michael Bonacini entered into its ownership structure as a co-owner. The restaurant thus after ten years got placed under the O&B banner.

Located in a mid 19th century cottage that was originally built in nearby Hoggs Hollow before getting relocated to its present location, the restaurant offers refined and modern interpretations of classic French dishes. Its executive chef is Marc St. Jacques who took over the post in 2011 having previously worked under celebrity chef Michael Mina at his restaurant Michael Mina at Bellagio in Las Vegas.
