= Cat Cora =

American chef

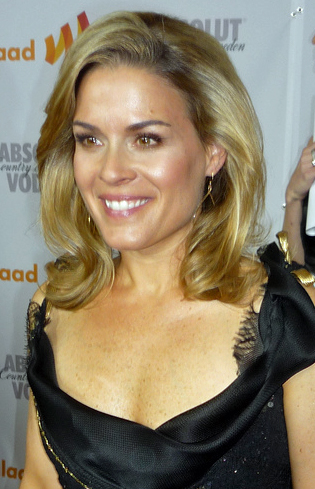
- Cora in April 2010
- Born: April 3, 1967 (age 59); United States
- Education: University of Southern Mississippi; Culinary Institute of America
- Height: 4 ft 11 in (1.49 m)
- Spouses: Jennifer Cora (m. 2013; div. 2015) Nicole Ehrlich (m. 2018; div. 2021)
- Children: 4
- Culinary career
- Cooking style: Mediterranean (Greek), Fusion ("Hellasian"), French
- Current restaurants
- Cat Cora's Que, Costa Mesa, CA (2008–present), Cat Cora's Kitchen, San Francisco, CA (2011–present),
- Previous restaurants
- Kouzzina by Cat Cora, Orlando, Florida (2009–2014), * Cat Cora's Kitchen, Atlanta, Georgia (2016–2020)
- Television shows
- Iron Chef America, Tournament of Champions, Kitchen Accomplished, Melting Pot, "MasterChef"
- Website: Official website

Catherine Ann Cora (born April 3, 1967) is an American professional chef, television personality, business person, and cookbook author. She is best known for her featured role as an "Iron Chef" on Iron Chef America and as co-host of Around the World in 80 Plates.

== Early life and education ==
Cora was born "Melanie" on April 3, 1967, to Joanne, an unwed teenage mother from Greenwood, Mississippi, and Knox, from Belzoni, Mississippi. Adopted at the age of one week, she grew up as the daughter of Virginia Lee (née Brothers) and Spiro "Pete" Cora in Jackson, Mississippi. Her adoptive father was of Greek descent (his parents being from Skopelos, Greece, himself born in Greenville, Mississippi only two months after they had arrived in America). Her grandfather and father were both restaurateurs. When she was 15 years old, she brought a business plan to her father and grandfather, knowing they could help her.

After earning her Bachelor of Science degree in Exercise Physiology and Biology from the University of Southern Mississippi, she enrolled at the Culinary Institute of America in Hyde Park, New York where she graduated in 1995.

== Television and entertainment career ==
Cora made her TV debut in 1999 as co-host with chef Rocco DiSpirito of Food Network's Melting Pot. In 2001, Cora appeared on the documentary television series, My Country, My Kitchen, in the episode Greece, Date Plate. She appeared on the television series Simplify Your Life (2002); and was a co-host of the Food Network show Kitchen Accomplished (2004).

Cora made television history in 2005 as the first female Iron Chef, joining Bobby Flay, Mario Batali and Masaharu Morimoto on the first season of Food Network's Iron Chef America, spending 10 seasons on the show. In 2008, she had a voice role for the video game Iron Chef America: Supreme Cuisine.

Cora is the co-host of Around the World in 80 Plates, an American reality competition show that premiered on May 9, 2012, on the Bravo cable TV network.

Cora co-hosted the 2017 FOX reality cooking series My Kitchen Rules. Cora competed in the 2021 Second Annual Guy Fieri's Tournament of Champions on the Food Network, narrowly losing to Michael Voltaggio.

== Restaurants ==
In 2008, Cora opened Cat Cora's Que (CCQ), a restaurant in Costa Mesa, California.

A number of airports across the United States feature Cat Cora's Kitchen and Cat Cora's Gourmet Markets which were opened in 2011 and 2012, including at George Bush International Airport (IAH) in Houston, San Francisco International Airport (SFO), Hartsfield–Jackson Atlanta International Airport (ATL), and Salt Lake City International Airport (SLC). The eponymous Cat Cora's Kitchen, a bar and lounge-style restaurant, opened at Terminal 2 at San Francisco International Airport in April 2011. Later in 2011, a Cat Cora's Kitchen was opened in Terminal E of the Bush Intercontinental Airport.

Cora operated Kouzzina by Cat Cora at Disney's BoardWalk Resort at the Walt Disney World Resort in Orlando, Florida, which closed on September 30, 2014.

Cora opened The Ocean Restaurant at the S.E.A. Aquarium at Resorts World Sentosa off Singapore in February 2013. The 63-seat restaurant is inside the world's largest oceanarium.

Since 2016, she has a partnership with Aramark, providing dining options in businesses, universities, schools, hospitals and sports stadiums under the names Olilo and Wicked Eats. As of 2022, there are more than 500 Olilo locations in the United States.

She is Executive Chef for Bon Appétit magazine.

=== Active ===
- Cat Cora's Kitchen, San Francisco, California (2011–present)
- Cat Cora's Kitchen, Salt Lake City, Utah (2012–)
- The Ocean Restaurant, Sentosa, Singapore (2013–present)
- Mesa Burger, Santa Barbara, California (2016–present)
- Mesa Burger, Goleta, California (2019–present)
- Mesa Burger, Montecito, California (2020–present)
- Cat Cora's Gourmet Markets

=== Closed ===
- Cat Cora's Que (CCQ), Costa Mesa, California (2008–Unknown Close Date)
- Kouzzina by Cat Cora, Orlando, Florida (2009–2014)
- Cat Cora's Kitchen, Houston, Texas (2011–2019)
- Cat Cora's Kitchen, Atlanta, Georgia (2016–2020)

== Partnerships and business ==
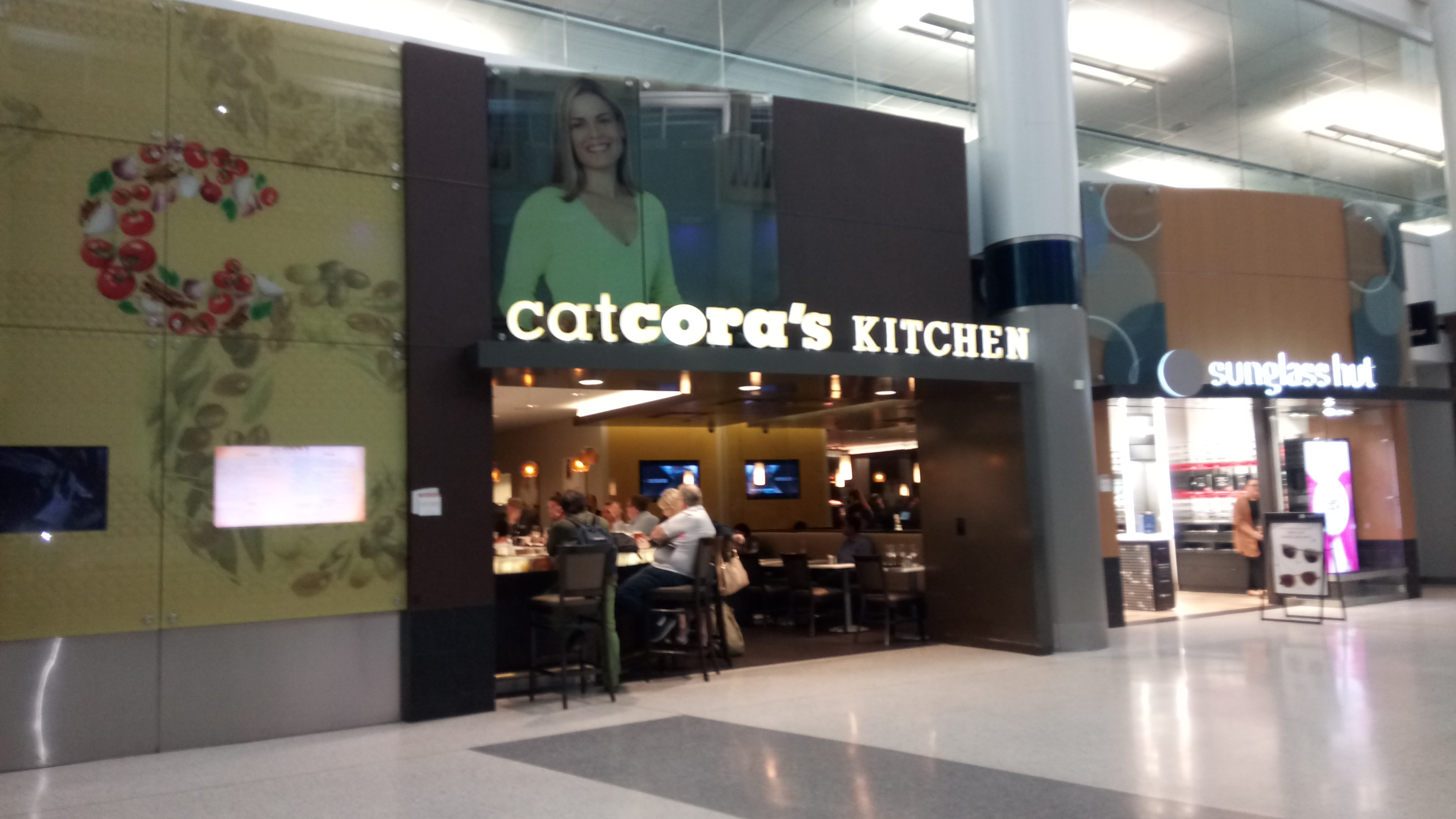
Cat Cora's Kitchen, a restaurant at Terminal E of George Bush Intercontinental Airport

Her first cookbook, Cat Cora's Kitchen (2004), was inspired by her Greek heritage and Southern roots, and contains numerous recipes that were her family's favorites while she was growing up.

Her partnerships with various corporations include: Macy's, when in 2008 they opened Cat Cora's Que (CCQ), a restaurant in Costa Mesa, California; Disney, when in 2010 they launched a series of webisodes called The Muppets Kitchen with Cat Cora; and a number of airports across the United States Cat Cora's Kitchen and Cat Cora's Gourmet Markets were opened in 2011 and 2012 (including George Bush International Airport in Houston, San Francisco International Airport, and Salt Lake City International Airport).

In 2006 she was hired as a paid spokesperson for InSinkErator Evolution series garbage disposals.

In June 2010, she joined Michelle Obama working with her Chefs Move To Schools campaign.

In 2011 she launched her own line of cookware in conjunction with Starfrit, Canada's leading purveyor of food preparation products.

In the September 2006 issue of FHM, Cora was featured in the cooking section, where she demonstrated various recipes using items purchased from a convenience store. Cat Cora also belongs to Macy's Culinary Councils, along with Tyler Florence, Rick Bayless, and others. She has worked as an entertainer for The Olivia Companies, a travel company catering to the lesbian market.

In October 2014, Cora launched her own line of hummus at H-E-B grocery stores in Texas.

== Charity ==
She was a UNICEF spokesperson. She has participated in charity wine auctions held by Auction Napa Valley.

In January 2005, following the Indian Ocean earthquake and tsunami, Cora co-founded Chefs For Humanity. The organization Chefs For Humanity describes itself as "a grassroots coalition of chefs and culinary professionals guided by a mission to quickly be able to raise funds and provide resources for important emergency and humanitarian aid, nutritional education, and hunger-related initiatives throughout the world."

== Awards ==
- Bon Appetit magazine's 2006 Teacher of the Year Award
- On July 12, 2015, Cora was inducted into the American Academy of Chefs® (AAC®) Hall of Fame by The American Culinary Federation, becoming the first female chef ever to receive this recognition.

== Personal life ==
Cora was a victim of child sexual abuse from when she was 6 years old to when she was 10 or 11. Her assaulter was nine years older than her.

In March 2006, Cora was the grand marshal for Hal and Mal's St. Paddy's Parade in her hometown of Jackson, Mississippi.

Cora was arrested for driving under the influence in 2012. Following a collision in which she rear-ended the car in front of her, the other driver reported to the officers that she believed Cora was drunk. Cora was placed under arrest and given a breathalyzer test that revealed her BAC to be .20 and .19, over twice the legal limit of .08. She pled no contest to the charges and was sentenced to 3 years probation, $2,386 in fines, and a suspended 120-day jail sentence. She released a statement after her arrest, saying: "I deeply regret my decision to drive that evening after my designated driver became unavailable. I learned a very important lesson from this experience and take full accountability for my actions. This will never happen again."

Cora married her longtime partner Jennifer in June 2013, and the couple have four sons together conceived via in vitro fertilization. In 2015, they filed for divorce which was finalized in 2016.

In 2017, Cora began dating record producer executive Nicole Ehrlich. They married on April 21, 2018. On April 26, 2021, Nicole Ehrlich filed for divorce from Cora.

== Filmography ==
Television
Year	Title	Role	Notes
1999	Melting Pot (Food Network)	Herself	
2001	My Country, My Kitchen	Herself	
2002	Simplify Your Life	Herself	
2004	Kitchen Accomplished	Host	
2005–2012	Iron Chef America	Iron Chef	
2006	Celebrity Cooking Showdown	Herself	
2007	Chef's Story	Herself	
2007	The Next Food Network Star	Guest Judge	
2008	The Next Iron Chef	Guest Judge	
2009–present	The Best Thing I Ever Ate	Herself	
2010	MasterChef (U.S. TV series)	Guest Judge	
2011	Top Chef: Just Desserts	Guest Judge	
2012	Top Chef	Guest Judge	
2012	Around the World in 80 Plates	Co-host	
2012	Chopped All-Stars	Contestant	
2012	Miss USA 2012	Judge	
2013	Eastbound & Down	Guest Chef	
2013–present	Guy's Grocery Games	Herself	
2014	America's Best Cook	Mentor	
2014	Food Fighters (TV series)	Herself	
2015	Cutthroat Kitchen	Guest Judge	
2017	My Kitchen Rules (U.S.)	Co-host	
2017	Bong Appetit (U.S.)	Guest Chef	
2019	Family Food Fight (U.S.)	Judge	
2021–present	Guy Fieri's Tournament of Champions	Herself	
2022	"The Real Dirty Dancing"	Herself	
2023	”Stars on Mars"“Stars on Mars”	Herself	
