= Alvin Leung =

Canadian chef and television personality (born 1961)

- 梁經倫
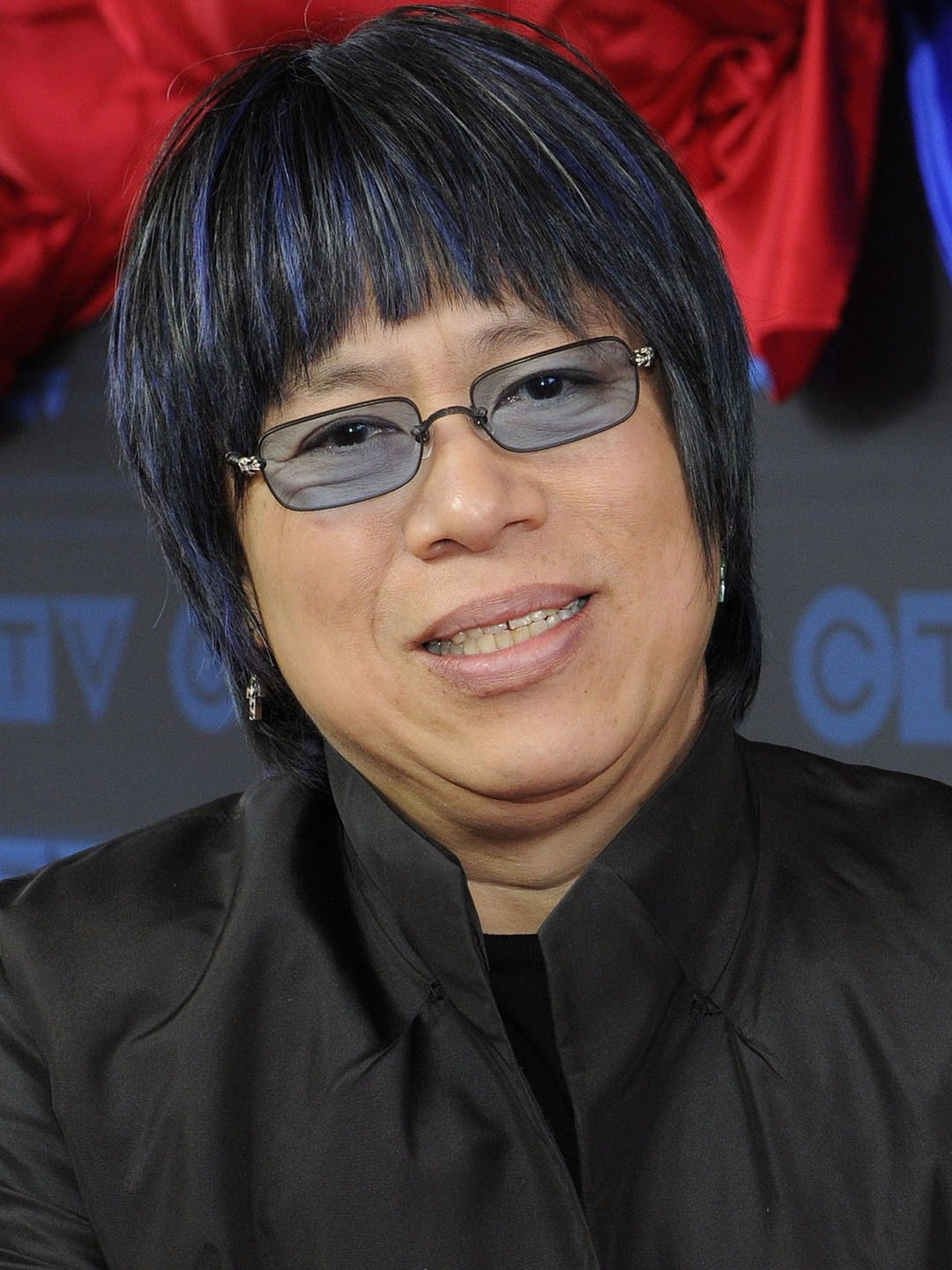
- Leung in 2014
- Born: 1 January 1961 (age 65); London, England
- Education: University of Toronto
- Spouse: Abby Wong (deceased)
- Children: 1
- Culinary career
- Cooking style: X-Treme Chinese
- Current restaurants
- aKin; Bo Innovation; R&D (Bib Gourmand)
- Previous restaurants
- Bo London; Bo Shanghai
- Television shows
- Around the World in 80 Plates; The Maverick Chef; MasterChef Canada
- Website: www.boinnovation.com

Alvin Leung King-Lon (Chinese: 梁經倫; born 1 January 1961) is an English-born Hong Kong–Canadian chef and television personality. His restaurants hold two Michelin stars at Bo Innovation and one Michelin star at aKin. Nicknamed The Demon Chef, he invented his own cuisine named X-Treme Chinese, which includes meals such as an edible condom on a mushroom beach.

His restaurant Bo London, based in Mayfair, London closed after a year in business. Another restaurant, Bo Shanghai was opened in Shanghai. Leung's fourth and fifth restaurants, R&D and aKin, are collaborations with Eric Chong and are located in Toronto.

Leung has appeared as a judge on MasterChef Canada from its debut in 2014 to 2021.

== Career ==
Born in London, England, Leung moved with his family to Scarborough, Toronto, Ontario, Canada, where he was raised. His first job in the culinary world was as a waiter, but afterwards trained as an engineer. He moved to Hong Kong and purchased a speakeasy called "Bo Inosaki" for £3,000, renaming it Bo Innovation.

A self-taught chef, Leung gave himself the nickname "The Demon Chef", and is known for a style of cooking he calls "X-Treme Chinese". He describes the Demon moniker as coming from the Greek word "Daimôn", meaning "good-spiritedness". X-Treme Chinese is a combination of fusion cuisine and molecular gastronomy, and is meant to show that the food he creates is pushing the limits.

His dishes at Bo Innovation include one called "Sex on a Beach" which involves an edible condom made out of a konjac and kappa on a beach made of mushroom. The condom itself is filled with a mixture of honey and ham. All of the proceeds from that dish go to charity AIDS Concern. His restaurant in Hong Kong received two stars in the Michelin Guide's inaugural 2009 Hong Kong and Macau edition, then upgraded to three stars in 2014 edition, and by 2012 was ranked in 52nd place in the list of the World's Best Restaurants. The writer Mark Rozzo called Bo Innovation "the El Bulli of the East."

In December 2012, Leung opened a second restaurant, Bo London, in his hometown of London, England. Within 10 months of opening, Bo London had gained its first Michelin star. Leung said that he intends for it to serve classic British fare such as dishes commonly served at bed and breakfasts, but with Chinese ingredients. He spent £500,000 on the site in Mill Street, Mayfair, and together with equipping the restaurant is expected to spend around £1 million on the restaurant. In March 2014, the restaurant closed following a 'serious water leak'.

He appeared on episode eight of the Bravo cooking travel show Around the World in 80 Plates. The episode was named after him, entitled "Feeding the Demon". Alongside the winner of MasterChef Canada Season 1, Eric Chong, Leung opened a restaurant called R&D in Toronto. The restaurant was opened in early 2015 and is named after the nicknames for Chong and Leung respectively, Rebel and Demon.

Leung serves as one of three judges in MasterChef Canada. He also serves as one of the judges in MediaCorp Channel 5's Wok Stars. He was also in the show The Listener Episode "Amuse Bouche" as a judge in a reality TV show, Five Star Chef.

In October 2017, it was announced that Leung would open a Spanish restaurant called Plato 86 and a Peking duck diner called The Forbidden Duck in Hong Kong. In April 2018, Leung opened another branch of Forbidden Duck in Singapore.

He is also set to debut his cookbook titled My Hong Kong.

== Personal life ==
Leung arrived in Canada after living in Hong Kong shortly after his birth in London and attended Highland Heights Jr. Public School in Scarborough. After graduating from L’amoreaux Collegiate Institute, he went on to studying civil engineering at the University of Toronto.

Leung practiced engineering for two decades before changing to culinary arts. Leung was married to his late wife Abby Wong, and has a daughter.
