= Michael Bonacini =

British-Canadian chef (born 1960)

- Born: 1 March 1960 (age 66); Tenby, Pembrokeshire, Wales
- Spouse: Valerie Bonacini
- Children: 1
- Culinary career
- Current restaurants
- Jump; Canoe; Oliver & Bonacini Restaurants
- Television shows
- Cook Like A Chef; MasterChef Canada; The Marilyn Denis Show; Bonacini's Italy
- Awards
- Ontario Hostelry Institution GOLD Award

Michael Bonacini (born March 1, 1960) is a Welsh-Canadian chef of Italian family origins who owns eleven restaurants (including Jump, Canoe, Luma, and Bannock) in Toronto, Ontario, and is a co-founder of Oliver & Bonacini Restaurants. Bonacini trained in London and immigrated to Canada in 1985. He founded his first restaurant, Jump, with business partner Peter Oliver in 1993.

From 2014 to 2021, Bonacini was a judge on the television cooking competition MasterChef Canada. He was also the host of Bonacini's Italy, a cooking program featuring cuisines from different regions of Italy cooked by Bonacini, was featured on Cook Like A Chef and was the resident chef for The Marilyn Denis Show.
