= I-40 Paradise =

American comedy and music TV series

- Theme music composer: Lionel Cartwright
- Country of origin: United States
- Original language: English

Production
- Producer: Ross Bagwell
- Running time: 30 minutes

Original release
- Network: The Nashville Network
- Release: March 1983 – April 1986

I-40 Paradise is a 30-minute daily cable TV sitcom broadcast on The Nashville Network from March 1983, when the network was first launched, until at least April 1986.

A weekly 30 minute spinoff, Pickin’ at the Paradise, began in December 1983.

== Premise ==
"The havoc and hi-jinks involved in running a restaurant and entertainment spot just outside Nashville are explored with hilarious results" was how early television listings described the series.

The series was set in the small town of Crab Orchard, Tennessee, and most scenes took place in the roadside diner, I-40 Paradise, that had a separate-room tavern where country artists often stopped to perform. There was a house-band, The Mighty Notes, headed by singer Buck Taylor. Buck's younger brother, Randy, was also in the band.

Local residents frequented I-40 Paradise, and they were part of the episode storylines. Stories included: Sonny, Buck, Orvis and Calvin join a group that helps fatherless boys, but have to share Crab Orchard's only orphan; Will Georgia quit her job to pursue a career in art?; Lathrop is kidnapped and held for ransom; and Velma and Calvin consider marriage.

== Cast ==
- Barbara George as Paradise owner LuAnn Bledsoe
- Bruce Carnahan as mechanic Sonny Rollins
- John Ribble as bartender Stogie
- Trish Dougherty as waitress Georgia
- Jack Crook as singer Buck Taylor
- Lionel Cartwright as singer Randy Taylor
- Kelli Warren as singer Melody Dawn Rainey
- Bruce Borin as shoe factory worker Calvin
- Liz Borin as beautician Velma, the girlfriend of Calvin
- Mike McElroy as pool hall owner Lathrop
- Park Overall as banker's daughter Tina Fudball (occasional role)
- Jack Victor Miller as 12-year-old boy-next-door Little Jake

== Guest stars ==
Country music performers would drop in on their way to Nashville and sing a couple of songs on each episode. One of the first guest stars to tape segments for the show was Helen Cornelius, and Ty Herndon was on several episodes before he became well known. Reba McEntire was on two episodes. In one she just sang, but the other had her take part in a conversation about video games, which was one of her first opportunities to act.

== Production ==
The series was produced by Cinetel Productions in Knoxville, Tennessee. Producer Ross Bagwell rented a warehouse to use as a studio, and hired mostly local dinner-theater actors as regulars. Outside shots of the I-40 Paradise building were of the nearby Mount Olive Trading Post, a grocery store that closed in 1987.

The production crew filmed five episodes each week, which required 12-hour work days. Work began at 7:00 a.m., and they usually began filming the day's episode at 8:30 p.m. The show aired three times each weekday, at noon, 5 p.m. and 8 p.m. It was the second most popular show on The Nashville Network, with Nashville Now the most popular show.

Lionel Cartwright, who'd been working at the Wheeling Jamboree, wrote the series theme song, and acted as one of the house-band singers.

== Spin off series ==
On December 25, 1983 Pickin’ at the Paradise began a six-week pilot run as a 30-minute Sunday series, advertised as a weekly visit to the Paradise's music room, where Crab Orchard residents would stop by to hear the house-band sing. Regulars included Lionel Cartwright as Randy, Jack Crook as Buck, and Kelli Warren as Melody Dawn. Lionel Cartwright wrote the series theme song. The series aired until at least March 1986.
